= History of Balochistan =

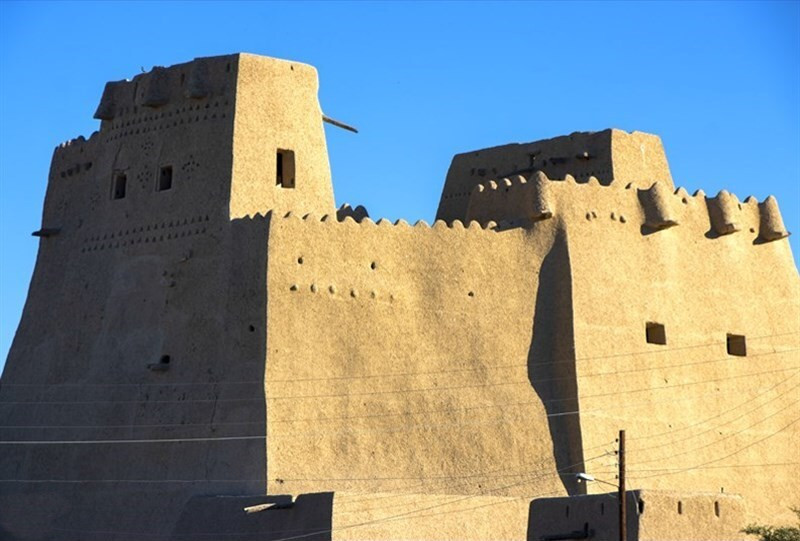
Sib and Suran, a Safavid era historical castle of Sistan.

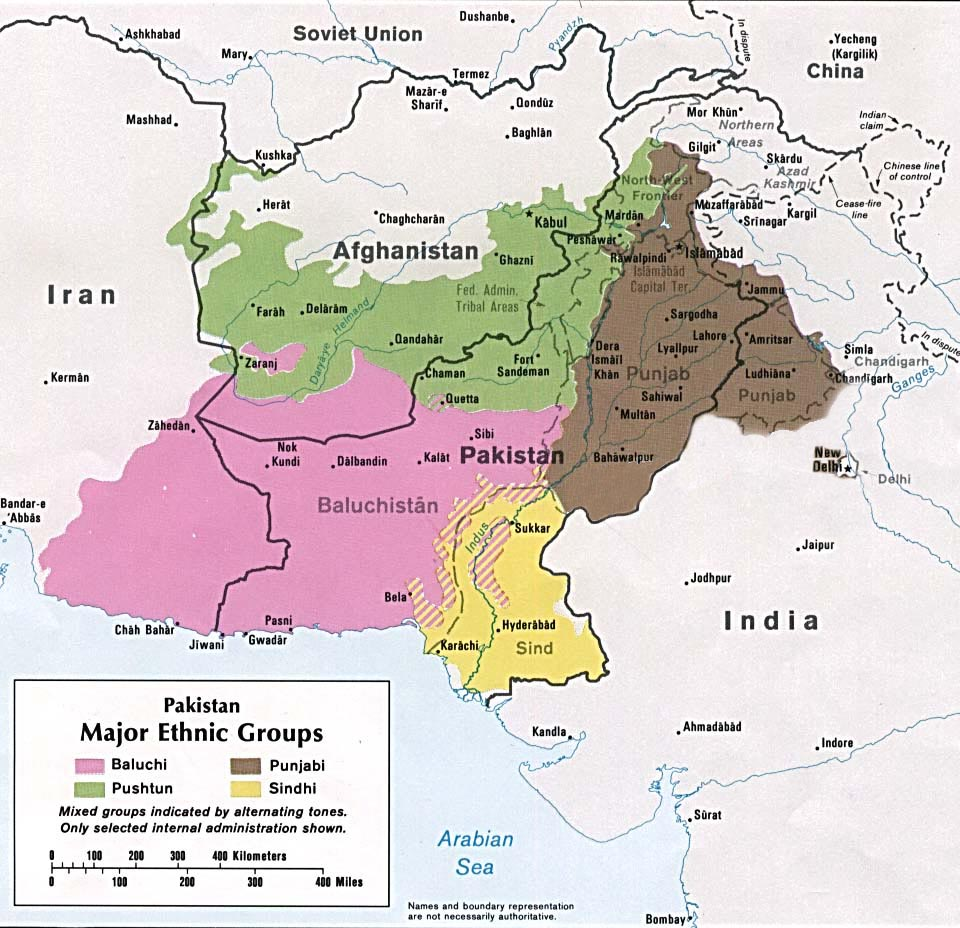
Balochistan region in pink

The history of Balochistan region of Pakistan, Iran and Afghanistan is interwoven with that of broader South and West Asia. There is evidence of ancient human settlements in present-day Balochistan dating back to around 7000 BCE. Vague allusions to the region are also found in Greek historical records starting from around 650 BCE. Comparatively better accounts are available from the Muslim historians and geographers after 7th century CE. The Baloch people migrated to Makran after 10th/11th centuries, and the region may have came to be known after them only in the 18th century CE under the Khanate of Kalat.

== Ancient history ==
The earliest evidence of human occupation in what is now Balochistan is dated to the Paleolithic era, represented by hunting camps, as well as chipped and flaked stone tools. The earliest settled villages in the region date to the ceramic Neolithic (c. 7000–5500 BCE), and included the Neolithic site of Mehrgarh located in the Kachi Plain. These villages expanded in size during the subsequent Chalcolithic, when interaction increased. This involved the movement of finished goods and raw materials, including chank shell, lapis lazuli, turquoise, and ceramics. By the Bronze Age in 2500 BCE, the region had become part of the Harappan cultural orbit, providing key resources to the expansive settlements of the Indus river basin to the east. Pakistani Balochistan marked the westernmost extent of the Indus Valley Civilisation.

The earliest people in present-day Balochistan were the Brahui people, a Dravidian speaking ethnolinguistic group primarily found in the region. Their language, Brahui, belongs to the Dravidian language family, although it is geographically separated from the main Dravidian speaking region of southern India. The origins of the Brahui people are uncertain, and several competing hypotheses have been proposed in scholarship, including suggestions that they may represent a remnant of an earlier Dravidian speaking population in the region. However, this view remains speculative and is not supported by conclusive historical or archaeological evidence. The Brahui population is today predominantly Sunni Muslim.

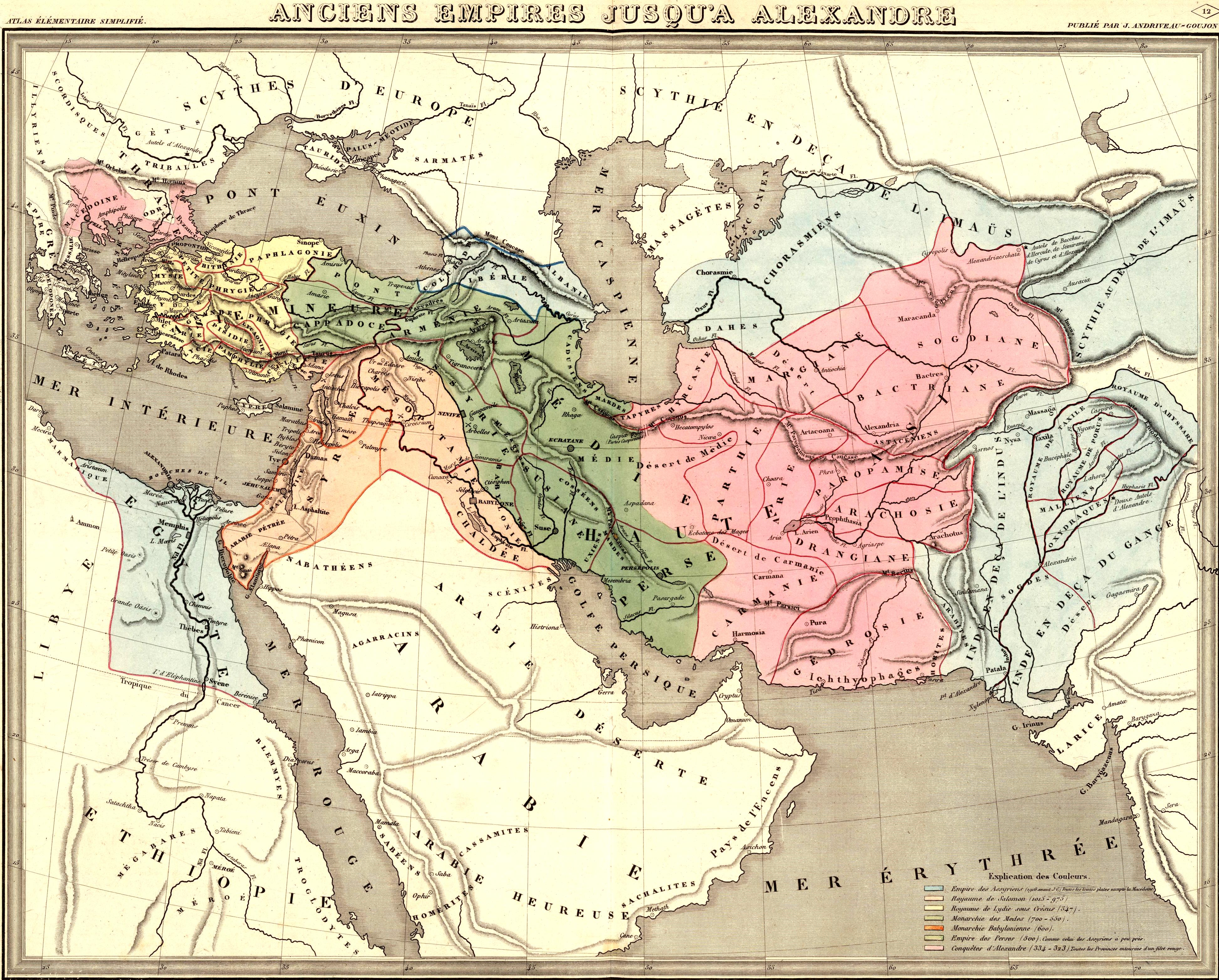
Ancient empires after the death of Alexander the Great

In 650 BC, the Greek historian Herodotus described the Paraitakenoi as a tribe ruled by Deiokes in north-western Persia (History I.101). The Achaemenids established the Satrapies of Gedrosia and Arachosia in the region after its conquest in 6th century BCE. Arrian described how Alexander the Great encountered the Pareitakai in Bactria and Sogdiana, and had Craterus conquer them (Anabasis Alexandrou IV). The Periplus of the Erythraean Sea in the 1st century described the territory of the Paradon beyond the Ommanitic region on the coast of modern Baluchistan.

After the victory of the Mauryan Empire against the Greeks in the Seleucid–Mauryan war, much of Baluchistan came under the rule of Chandragupta Maurya. Chandragupta and Seleucus made a peace settlement in 303 BCE. Seleucus I Nicator ceded the satrapies, including Gedrosia and Arachosia, to the expanding Mauryan Empire. The alliance was solidified with a marriage between Chandragupta Maurya and the Seleucids. The outcome of the arrangement proved to be mutually beneficial. The border between the Seleucid and Mauryan Empires remained stable in subsequent generations, and friendly diplomatic relations are reflected by the ambassador Megasthenes, and by the envoys sent westward by Chandragupta's grandson Ashoka.

From the 1st century to the 3rd century CE, northern region of present-day Pakistani Balochistan was ruled by the Pāratarājas, the "Pātatahaa Kings", a dynasty of Indo-Scythian or Indo-Parthian origin. The Hindu Parata kings are essentially known through their coins, which typically exhibit the bust of the ruler with long hair in a headband on the obverse and a swastika within a circular legend on the reverse, written in Brahmi, usually silver coins, or Kharoshthi copper coins. These coins are mainly found in Loralai in western Pakistan. There were five major Parataraja kings in the 2nd century; Yolamira, son of Bagavera, Arjuna, son of Yolamira, Hvaramira, another son of Yolamira, Mirahvara, son of Hvaramira, and Miratakhma, another son of Hvaramira. In 635 or 636 CE, the Hindu Chach dynasty of Sindh controlled Makran under Chach of Aror.

Iranian Balochistan had some of the earliest human civilizations in history. The Burnt city near Dozaap (Zahidan) dates to 2000 BCE. All of what is now Baluchistan was incorporated in the Achaemenid, Seleucid, Parthian, and Sassanid empires.

At the time of the Umayyad conquest of Sindh in the early 8th century, Zuṭṭ (Jats) populated Makran and Turan (including Qiqan, modern Kalat) as far as the east bank of Indus, where cities of Mansura and Multan were located. Makran had a significant number of Zuṭṭ at the time (or before) the Muslim conquest who had moved eastward into Sind as well in the following centuries.

== Medieval history ==
=== Arab Caliphates ===
Arab forces invaded Makran, then a part of Sindh under Chach dynasty in the 7th century. In the 14th year of the Hijra, 636–6 CE, maharaja Chach marched and conquered Makran. However, in 643 the Arabs reached Makran. In early 644 CE, Caliph Umar sent Suhail ibn Adi from Bosra to conquer the Kerman region in Iran. He was made governor of Kerman. From Kerman he entered Makran and conquered the region near Persian frontiers. Western Makran was conquered during the campaign in Sistan that same year.

During Caliph Uthman's reign in 652, Makran was reconquered during the campaign against the revolt in Karman under the command of Majasha ibn Mas'ud. It was first time Makran came directly under the laws of the Caliphate and paid grain tributes. It was included in the dominion of Karman. In 654, Abd al-Rahman ibn Samura was made governor of Sistan. He led an Islamic army to crush the revolt in Zarang, now in southern Afghanistan. Conquering Zarang, a column moved northward to conquer areas up to Kabul and Ghazni in the Hindu Kush mountains while another column moved towards Qayqan (near modern Quetta or Khuzdar) and conquered the area up to the ancient cities of Dawar and Qandabil (Bolan). By 654 the most of what is now Pakistani Baluchistan was under the rule of the Rashidun Caliphate except for the well-defended mountain town of Qayqan, which was conquered during Caliph Ali's reign. Abd al-Rahman ibn Samura made Zaranj his provincial capital and remained governor of these conquered areas from 654 to 656, until Uthman was assassinated.

During the reign of Caliph Ali, Makran again broke into revolt. Due to civil war in the Islamic empire Ali was unable to take notice of these areas, at last in the year 660 he sent a large force under the command of Haris ibn Marah Abdi towards Makran. Haris ibn Marah Abdi arrived in Makran and conquered it by force then moved north ward to Qandabil (Bolan), then again moving south finally conquered Kalat after a fierce battle. In 663 CE, during the reign of Umayyad Caliph Muawiyah I, Muslims lost control of northeastern Balochistan and Kalat when Haris ibn Marah and large part of his army died on the battle field suppressing a revolt in Kalat. Muslim forces later re-gained the control of the area during Umayyads' reign. It also remained part of Abbasid Caliphate's empire.

Arab rule in Makran lasted until the end of the 10th century. The parts of the region best known to them were Turan (the Jhalawan country) with its capital at Khuzdar, and Nudha or Budha (Kachhi). Around 976, Ibn Hawqal found an Arab governor residing in Qayqan (probably the modern Nal) and governing Khuzdar during his second visit to India.

=== Ghaznavid Empire ===
Shortly afterwards, western Balochistan fell to Nasir-ud-Din Sabuktigin. His son, Mahmud of Ghazni, conquered the whole of Makran. After the Ghaznavids, the area passed to the Ghurids. A little later, present-day Balochistan became part of the dominion of Sultan Muhammad Khan of Khwarazmian dynasty in 1219. However, in around 1223 a Mongol expedition under Chagatai, the son of Genghis Khan, penetrated as far as Makran. A few years later, southeastern Baluchistan briefly came under the rule of Sultan Iltutmish of Delhi Sultanate but soon came back under Mongol rule. The raids organised by the Mongols have left a lasting mark on the region, and the atrocities they caused are still well known.

Afterwards the history of region centres around Kandahar and it was in this area in 1398 that Pir Muhammad, the grandson of Timur, fought the Afghans in the Sulaiman Mountains. According to local tradition Timur himself passed through Marri country during one of his Indian expeditions.

=== Arghun dynasty ===
Baloch tribes became prominent in the history of Makran after 13th and 14th centuries. They extended their power to Kalat, Kachhi, and Punjab, and the wars took place between Mir Chakar Khan Rind and Mir Gwahram Khan Lashari which are so celebrated in Baloch verse. In these wars a prominent part was played by Amir Zunnun Beg Arghun, who was governor of Kandahar under Sultan Husain Mirza of Herat about 1470. At the same time the Brahui people had been gradually gaining strength, and their little principality at this time extended through the Jhalawan country to Wadh. The Arghun dynasty gave way to Babur shortly afterwards. From 1556 to 1595 the region was under the Safavid dynasty. The army of Akbar the Great then brought what is now Balochistan under control of the Mughal Empire until 1638, when it was again transferred to Persia.

According to the Ain-i-Akbari, in 1590 the upper highlands were included in the sardar of Kandahar while Kachhi was part of the Bhakkar sarkar of the Multan Subah. Makran alone remained independent under the Buledais, and Gichkis, until Nasir Khan I of Kalat brought it within his power during the 17th century.

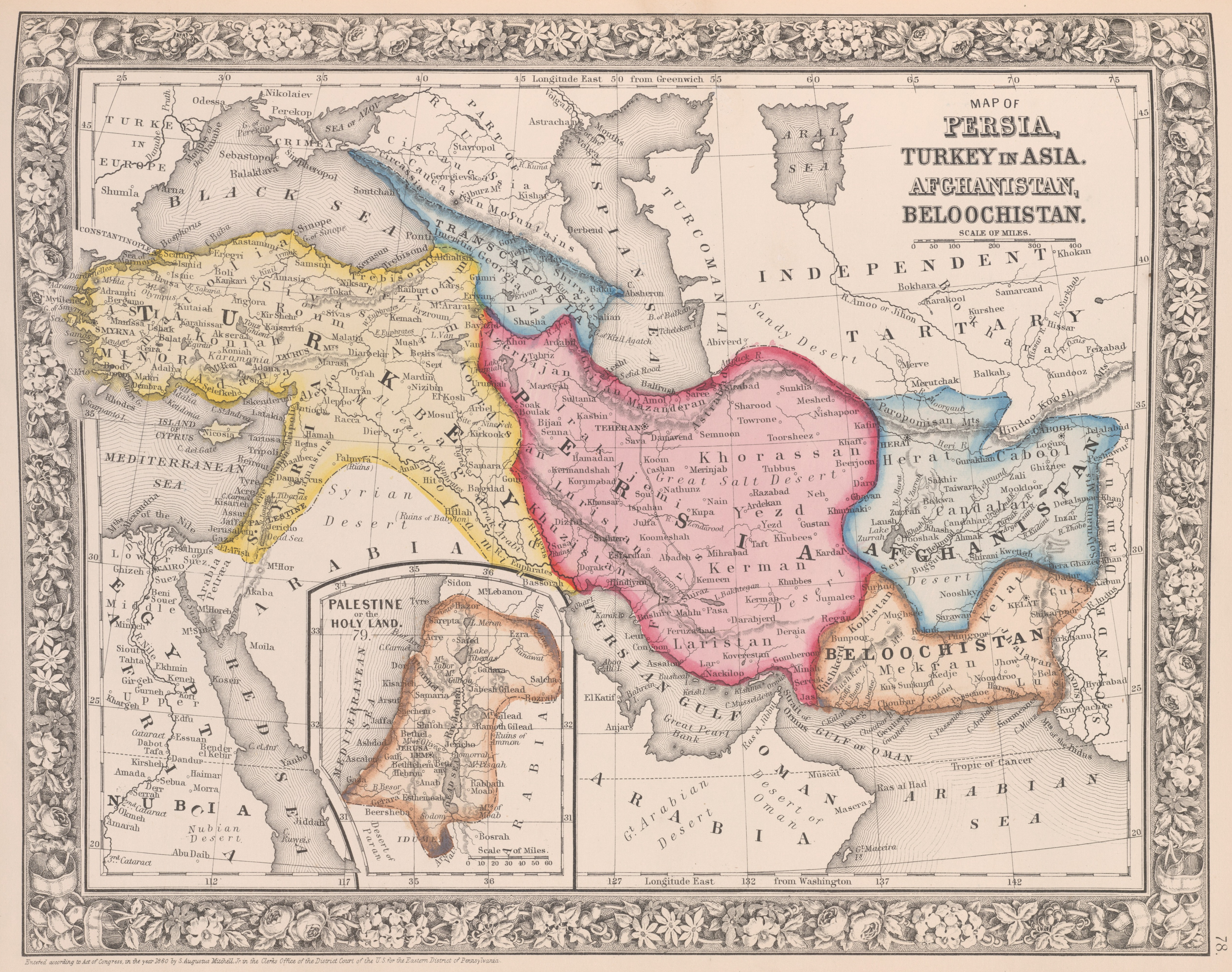
1863 map before the British occupation; Beloochistan in orange

From the middle of the 17th century large parts of Baluchistan remained under the Safavids until the rise of the Ghilzai in 1708. Nadir Shah defeated Ghilzai and in the first part of the 18th century, he made several expeditions to, or through, Baluchistan. Ahmad Shah Durrani followed. The northeastern part of the country, including almost all of the areas now under direct administration, remained under the more or less nominal suzerainty of the Sadozais and Barakzais until 1879, when Pishin, Duki, and Sibi passed into British hands by the Treaty of Gandamak. The whole of Western Baluchistan had been consolidated into an organized state under the Brahui Khans.

=== Khanate of Kalat ===
The Brahui Khans of Kalat built an independent Khanate in the 17th century in the mountainous territory of Kalat. They were never fully independent; there was always a paramount power to whom they were subject. In the earliest times they were merely petty chiefs: later they bowed to the orders of the Mughal emperors of Delhi and to the rulers of Kandahar, and supplied men-at-arms on demand. Most peremptory orders from the Afghan rulers to their vassals of Kalat are still extant, and the predominance of the Sadozais and Barakzais was acknowledged so late as 1838. It was not until the time of Nasir Khan I that the titles of Beglar Begi (Chief of Chiefs) and Wali-i-Kalat (Governor of Kalat) were conferred on the Kalat ruler by the Afghan kings.

As Mughal power declined, the Brahui chiefs found themselves freed to some degree from external interference. The first challenge to the chiefs was insuring social cohesion and cooperation within the loose tribal organization of the state. They parceled out a portion of the spoils of all conquests among the poverty-stricken highlanders. A period of expansion then commenced. Mir Ahmad made successive descents into the plains of Sibi. Mir Samandar extended his raids to Zhob, Bori, and Thal-Chotiali. He levied an annual sum of Rs. 40,000 from the Kalhoras.

Mir Abdullah, the greatest conqueror of the dynasty, turned his attention westward to Makran, while in the north-east he captured Pishin and Shorawak from the Ghilzai rulers of Kandahar. He was eventually slain in a fight with the Kalhoras at Jandrihar near Sanni in Kachhi.

During the reign of Mir Abdullah's successor, Mir Muhabbat, Nadir Shah rose to power and the Ahmadzai ruler obtained through him the cession of Kachhi in 1740 in compensation for the blood of Mir Abdullah and the men who had fallen with him from the Kalhora dynasty of Sindh. The Brahuis had now gained what highlanders always coveted, good cultivable lands. By the wisdom of Muhabbat Khan and of his brother Nasir Khan, certain tracts were distributed among the tribesmen on the condition of finding so many men-at-arms for the Khan's body of irregular troops. At the same time much of the revenue-paying land was retained by the Khan for himself.

The forty-four years of the rule of Nasir Khan I, known to the Baloch as 'The Great,' and the hero of their history, were years of strenuous administration and organization interspersed with military expeditions. He accompanied Ahmad Shah in his expeditions to Persia and India. A wise and able administrator, Nasir Khan was distinguished for his prudence, activity, and enterprise. He was essentially a warrior and a conqueror, and his spare time was spent in hunting. At the same time he was most attentive to religion, and enjoined on his people strict attention to the precepts of Islamic law. His reign was free from those internecine conflicts, subsequently common in Kalat's history. He invaded Makran, a Gichki territory, as well as Kharan and Las Bela to merge them into his Khanate.

The reign of Nasir Khan's successor, Mir Mahmud Khan, was distinguished by little except revolts. In 1810 Henry Pottinger visited his capital and left a full record of his experience. The reign of Mir Mehrab Khan was one long struggle with his chiefs, many of whom he murdered. He became dependent on men of the stamp of Mulla Muhammad Hasan and Saiyid Muhammad Sharif, by whose treachery, at the beginning of the first Afghan War, Sir William Macnaghten and Sir Alexander Burnes were deceived into thinking that Mehrab Khan was a traitor to the British; that he had induced the tribes to oppose the advance of the British army through the Bolan Pass; and that finally, when Sir Alexander Burnes was returning from a mission to Kalat, he had caused a robbery to be committed on the party, in the course of which an agreement, which had been executed between the envoy and the Khan, was carried off. This view determined the diversion of Sir Thomas Willshire's brigade from Quetta to attack Kalat in 1839, an act which has been described by Malleson as 'more than a grave error, a crime.' The place was taken by assault and Mehrab Khan was slain.

== Modern history ==
=== British Indian Empire ===
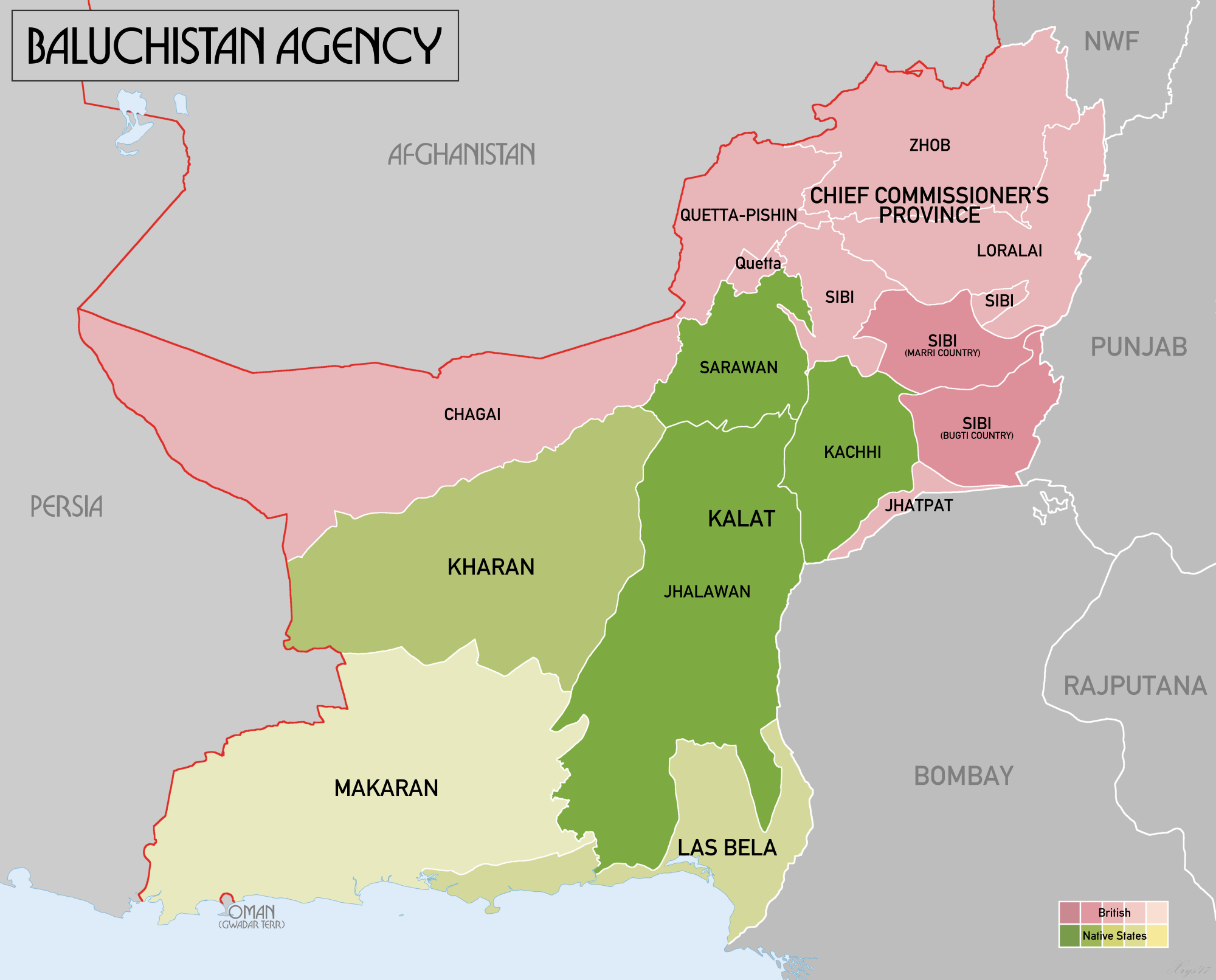
The Baluchistan Agency of the British Indian Empire, showing the Chief Commissioner's Province of Baluchistan (the "British Baluchistan") and the princely states: Kalat, the subsidiary states of Kharan and Las Bela, and the District of Makran.

Britain and Iran divided Baluchistan into many parts, with the British creating the Baluchistan Agency in 1877. In the 19th century, nationalists in western Baluchistan revolted against the Persian occupation. At the end of the 19th century, when Sardar Hussein Narui Baloch started an uprising against Persia which was crushed by joint Anglo-Persian mission forces. The struggle between the Persian Qajar dynasty, and the British in eastern Baluchistan, gave western Baluchs a chance to gain control of their territory in Western Baluchistan. At the beginning of the 20th century, Bahram Khan succeeded in gaining control of Baluch- lands. In 1916, the British Indian Empire recognized him as in effective control of western Baluchistan. Mir Dost Muhammad Khan Baluch, Bahram Khan's nephew, succeeded to the throne, and in 1920, he proclaimed himself Shah-e-Baluchistan (Persian for King of Baluchistan) but in 1928, Reza Shah came into power and Persian forces started operations against Baluchi forces with the help of British. The Baluch were defeated and Mir Dost Muhammad Khan Baluch captured. In the same year, Mir Dost Muhammad Khan Baluch was executed in a Tehran prison. Baluchis were not content with the British, and raised their voices against the occupation of Western Baluchistan by Persia at Baluch Conference of Jacobabad.

The Germans established contact with the Baloch and provided them military strategy. The Baloch war with the British army resulted in several clashes and casualties to the British forces in Makran in 1916. In Seistan Force raids on the lines of communication of the force were made by the Baloch and certain Baloch tribes of Balochistan, notably the Damanis of Sarhad with strategic and military assistance from the German agent, Zugmayer. In order to prevent these, and to control the region, Brig.-Gen. R. E. R. E. Dyer, Commanding in balochistan, moved a part of his force to Khash in May, 1916.

The British Indian Empire gradually became involved in Balochistan during the reign of Mir Mehrab Khan whose reign was characterised by the power struggle he had with the chief, many of whom he had murdered. Mehrab Khan had become dependent on Mulla Muhammad Hasan and Saiyid Muhammad Sharif. And it was these men who had convinced the British that he had encouraged the tribes to oppose the British advance through the Bolan pass. The British justified their 1839 attack of Kalat on this, and had Mehrab Khan killed, his successor — Mir Shah Nawaz Khan was then appointed with Lieutenant Loveday as political officer. However a rebellion of the Sarawan tribes the following year forced Shah Nawaz to abdicate. His successor Mir Muhammad Hasan then took power and afterwards being known as Mir Nasir Khan II.

Under pressure from Colonel Stacey, Mir Nasir Khan II submitted to the British Indian Empire, and Major Outram had him installed at Kalat in 1840.

Colonel Sir Robert Groves Sandeman introduced an innovative system of tribal pacification in Balochistan that was in effect from 1877 to 1947. However the Government of British India generally opposed his methods and refused to allow it to operate in the North West Frontier. Historians have long debated its scope and effectiveness in the peaceful spread of Imperial influence.

Mir Khudadad Khan was tended to as a non-Indian prince against his will at the 1877 Durbar. But at the end of the durbar the Khan was given the honour accorded to Indian princes. This demonstrated that while the state had been treated as a non-Indian state in the beginning of the durbar, the British Government accepted it as an Indian state at the end of the assembly. After this and particularly after the 1877 establishment of the Baluchistan Agency, Kalat was regarded an Indian state.

The British were the dominant power in Kalat, since Khudadad Khan was compelled to abdicate, and the khan's authority was restricted. The political agent in Kalat gave allowances to Sarawan and Jhalawan's tribal chiefs and Kharan and Las Bela had become effectively independent of Kalat. Moreover, Kalat's Prime Minister was an Indian Government deputy who did not answer to the khan.

In 1933 Ahmad Yar Khan became the Kalat's ruler with an insecure place in the Baluch-Brahui confederacy. To obtain complete control of Kalat, he requested the Government of India to restore his authority. While acknowledging the benefits of the British he claimed it was now time for him to take power. The Indian Government agreed but wanted to maintain power over the disbursements to the chiefs, in addition, to sanction over their authorisation and dismissal. This did not allow Ahmad Yar Khan any real authority over the chiefs.

The Khan demanded that his sovereignty be accepted over Kharan and Las Bela, his authority be completely reinvigorated in Kalat and the return of the districts of Nasirabad, Nushki and Quetta. The Indian Government knew to preserve Khan's loyalty some powers had to be given to him. While the government allowed him to control the disbursements to the chiefs, the Khan could not make significant decisions about them unless the AGG agreed. Despite the disadvantages, the Khan obtained a nominal victory by retaking authority in the state.

After this, the Khan claimed that Kalat was a non-Indian state and requested the Government of India to accept his rule over Las Bela, Kharan and the Bugti and Marri tribal regions. The Government of India concluded after a careful investigation that Kalat had always been an Indian state. Since the Government policy was to not allow the breakup of the confederacy it accepted that Las Bela and Kharan were under the formal suzerainty of Kalat; simultaneously recognizing Kharan's status as a separate state. The extent of this "suzerainty" was never explained although the Khan saw it as a triumph.

=== Pakistan Movement ===
Scholar Ian Talbot states that the British Baluchistan was socially and economically underdeveloped compared to other parts of British India with an extremely low literacy rate and a mainly rural population. The province was also politically backward. During British rule Baluchistan Agency which excluded Princely States was under the rule of a Chief Commissioner and did not have the same status as other provinces of British India. Yet it was an important province for the All-India Muslim League which, under Muhammad Ali Jinnah, proposed in 1928 that democratic reforms be introduced to Baluchistan.

The people of province began to organise politically in the 1930s. In 1932, Yusuf Ali Khan Magsi held the First All-India Baloch Conference in Jacobabad. His party, the Anjuman-i-Ittehad-i-Baluchen, was succeeded by the Kalat State National Party, which in turn cooperated with the Indian National Congress branch in Baluchistan, known as the Anjuman-i-Watan. In 1939 a local lawyer, Qazi Muhammad Isa, created the Balochistan Muslim League in Pishin at a mosque meeting. The Muslim League, however, would not accept this organisation without a proper constitution. After the Pakistan Resolution, Qazi Isa gained membership of the All-India Muslim League Working Committee. In July 1940, with Liaquat Ali Khan as President, the Baluchistan Provincial Muslim League held its first session, where it highlighted its call for the introduction of political reforms to Baluchistan.

It was only a couple of years later that the mainly inactive Baluchistan Muslim League held its second session. In 1943, the League's activity saw a brief revival with the visit of Jinnah to the province. A crowd, estimated to number at 50,000, attended to give him a "royal" reception. Many Nawabs and tribal leaders attended his address to the Baluchistan League and he was eventually invited as a guest of the Khan of Kalat. As a result of Jinnah's visit, the Muslim Students Federation was formed. Later, the Baluchistan League returned to idleness and internal bickering.

However, after the Simla Conference, the Muslim League intensified its activism. Provincial opinion was mainly in favour of the Pakistan Movement, especially in the townships. Muslim League rallies in Baluchistan were attended by a "much larger" number of people than the Anjuman-i-Watan rallies. Jinnah, in his second visit to Baluchistan in late 1945, again reiterated his call that the province be granted political reforms. The Muslim League held several rallies and counteracted the Congress propaganda. On 29 January 1947, a call for a strike in response to the arrest of the Muslim League leaders received an "almost complete" response in Quetta.

In British-ruled Colonial India, Baluchistan contained a Chief Commissioner's province and princely states (including Kalat, Makran, Las Bela and Kharan) that became a part of Pakistan. The province's Shahi Jirga and the non-official members of the Quetta Municipality, according to the Pakistani narrative, agreed to join Pakistan unanimously on 29 June 1947; however, the Shahi Jirga was stripped of its members from the Kalat State prior to the vote. The then president of the Baluchistan Muslim League, Qazi Muhammad Isa, informed Muhammad Ali Jinnah that "Shahi Jirga in no way represents the popular wishes of the masses" and that members of the Kalat State were "excluded from voting; only representatives from the British part of the province voted and the British part included the leased areas of Quetta, Nasirabad Tehsil, Nushki and Bolan Agency." Following the referendum, the Khan of Kalat, on 22 June 1947, received a letter from members of the Shahi Jirga, as well as sardars from the leased areas of Baluchistan, stating that they, "as a part of the Baloch nation, were a part of the Kalat state too" and that if the question of Baluchistan's accession to Pakistan arise, "they should be deemed part of the Kalat state rather than (British) Balochistan". This has brought into question whether an actual vote took place in the town hall "and that the announcement in favour of accession was secured through sheer manipulation." Political scientist Salman Rafi Sheikh, in locating the origins of the insurgency in Balochistan, says "that Balochistan's accession to Pakistan was, as against the officially projected narrative, not based upon consensus, nor was support for Pakistan overwhelming. What this manipulation indicates is that even before formally becoming a part of Pakistan, Balochistan had fallen a prey to political victimization."

The Congress, knowing that union with India would be unrealistic due to demographic and geographic reasons, propagated the notion that Pakistan would be too economically weak. Jinnah requested that the general population should be allowed to vote instead of the limited electorate of the Shahi Jirga. But the British refused the request.

Ahmed Yar Khan who was the ruler of Kalat both supported the establishment of Pakistan and wanted to become independent. The first test of what the Khan asserted was Jinnah's support came about in the wake of his demand that the Government of India return the leased territories. Neither Mountbatten nor Pakistan favoured this retrocession.

According to the Indian Government, Kalat had been an Indian and not independent state. Thus, the 3 June plan required that it choose either accession to India or Pakistan. Kalat argued that it had possessed a sovereign status rather than the status of an Indian state. The topic of discussion moved to Pakistan’s rejection of Kalat’s claims over the leased areas. Pakistan argued that it was the heir to India’s agreements with Indian states, while Kalat argued that the treaty explicitly limited the party to the British Government. Kalat and Pakistan also disputed over whether the agreements over the leased areas were personal to Kalat and the British Government. Mountbatten also claimed that International law dictated that such treaties were inherited upon a transfer of power. He also brought up the option of referring the dispute to an Arbitral Tribunal in case a resolution could not be reached. Moreover, even Ahmed Yar Khan also accepted Pakistan as a legal, constitutional and political successor of the British in negotiation held in September 1947. The British Foreign Office and Political Department had also declared Pakistan to be the heir to the leases.

Ahmad Yar Khan's choice was to either accept that Kalat was an Indian state and regain the leased territories or persist claiming that it was non-Indian and lose the leased areas.

Ahmad Yar Khan had insisted on the non-Indian status so that he could avoid India's political and constitutional evolution. But Pakistan used that same argument to keep control over the leased areas. Talks between Kalat and Pakistan started in September 1947. The negotiations showed that while Pakistan had accepted Kalat's claim of holding a non-Indian status, it still wanted accession on the same lines as the other states. The negotiation also declared Pakistan as legal, constitutional and political successor of British. Through these negotiations, the British Paramountcy was effectively transferred to Pakistan. Why Ahmad Yar Khan would agree to this at that time is unclear but according to Nawabzada Aslam Khan the Khan would accede because "if he did not, his sardars would turn him out, as they were determined to join Pakistan anyhow and were only waiting to be assured of their own rights."

Feeling that Khan did not want to accede explicitly, Jinnah invited him in October to convince him. Ahmad Yar Khan took this as an opportunity to convince Jinnah for a treaty which would allow Pakistan's government equal control over Kalat but without a full accession. Jinnah was unprepared for this and asked for an Instrument of Accession. The Khan asked for more time by citing his state's unique nature and his intent to consult his parliament. Although he was theoretically correct on Kalat's confederal system, by consulting the state's chiefs he paved the path for the Pakistani Government to deal directly with the chiefs.

In acceptance of the decision of the Indian government the Pakistani government regarded Las Bela and Kharan as being a part of the Baluch-Brahui confederacy led by Kalat's ruler. While Kalat and Pakistan held talks, the rulers of Kharan and Las Bela endeavored to get the Pakistani government to recognise their separateness from Kalat. Kharan's chief, knowing the difficulties around Kalat's accession, tried to accede to Pakistan in November. The Jam of Las Bela wrote similarly. But the Pakistani government ignored their enthusiasm while discussions about accession were being held with Kalat.

Kalat's feudatory states, Las Bela and Kharan, and its district of Makran, requested Pakistan to be allowed to accede separately, stating that "if Pakistan was not prepared to accept their offers of accession immediately, they would be compelled to take other steps for their protection against Khan of Kalat." Pakistani civil servants recognised their claims of independence from Kalat and allowed them to accede to Pakistan separately on 17 March 1948. Using the ambiguity of Kalat's suzerainty over Kharan and Las Bela to allow the separate accessions, the Pakistani government asserted that the nature of the Kalat confederation was such that each chief could choose to secede from it and voluntarily join Pakistan. The British High Commission opined that the Khan would be left without any territory if he delayed. The Commonwealth Relations Office noted "There are a number of Kalat sardars in Karachi offering their accession to Pakistan, and Pakistan Government may repeat procedure followed in case of Mekran and accept these offers, leaving the Khan practically without territory."

Consequently, Kalat came into conflict with Makran, ruled by Nawab Bai Khan Gichki who had opted to join Pakistan. The Khan of Kalat then stopped carrying out his obligation to provide the Makran Levy Corps with food supplies. With starvation imminent, Sir Ambrose Dundas requested Pakistan to provide food supplies, send reinforcements for the Makran Levy Corps and assume administration over Makran. However, the Khan of Kalat decided to accede even before the proposed Pakistani action in Makran was implemented. The accessions of Las Bela, Kharan and Makran to Pakistan had left Kalat geographically landlocked with no sea access. The pressure intensified when, on 27 March 1948, the All India Radio announced that the Khan of Kalat had offered accession to India. Hearing this radio announcement became the reason for the Khan's decision to accede to Pakistan on that same day. The Khan asserted that he had made the decision to sign the instrument of accession because he believed that Pakistan was facing an existential threat.

=== Insurgency in Balochistan ===
==== First conflict ====
The signing of the Instrument of Accession by the Khan of Kalat, led his brother, Prince Abdul Karim, to revolt against his brother's decision in July 1948. Prince Abdul Karim took refuge in Afghanistan to wage an unconventional attacks against Pakistan. However, he ultimately surrendered to Pakistan in 1950. The Prince fought a lone battle without support from the rest of Balochistan. Jinnah and his successors allowed Yar Khan to retain his title until the province's dissolution in 1955.

==== Second conflict ====
Nawab Nauroz Khan, Chief of Jhalawan took up arms in resistance to the One Unit policy, which decreased government representation for tribal leaders, from 1958 to 1959. He and his followers started a guerrilla war against Pakistan, and were arrested, charged with treason, and imprisoned in Hyderabad. Five of his family members, sons and nephews, were subsequently hanged on charges of treason and aiding in the murder of Pakistani troops. Nawab Nauroz Khan later died in captivity.

==== Third conflict ====
After the second conflict, a Baloch separatist movement gained momentum in the 1960s, following the introduction of a new constitution in 1956 which limited provincial autonomy and enacted the 'One Unit' concept of political organisation in Pakistan. Tension continued to grow amid consistent political disorder and instability at the federal level. The federal government tasked the Pakistan Army with building several new bases in key areas of Balochistan. Sher Muhammad Bijrani Marri led like-minded militants into guerrilla warfare from 1963 to 1969 by creating their own insurgent bases, spread out over 45,000 miles (72,000 km) of land, from the Mengal tribal area in the south to the Marri and Bugti tribal areas in the north. Their goal was to force Pakistan to share revenue generated from the Sui gas fields with the tribal leaders. The insurgents bombed railway tracks and ambushed convoys. The Army retaliated by destroying vast areas of the Marri tribe's land. This insurgency ended in 1969, with the Baloch separatists agreeing to a ceasefire. In 1970 Pakistani President Yahya Khan abolished the "One Unit" policy, which led to the recognition of Balochistan as the fourth province of West Pakistan (present-day Pakistan), including all the Balochistani princely states, the High Commissioners Province, and Gwadar, an 800 km^{2} coastal area purchased from Oman by the Pakistani government.

==== Fourth conflict 1973–77 ====
The unrest continued into the 1970s, culminating in a government-ordered military operation in the region in 1973.

In 1973, citing treason, President Bhutto dismissed the provincial governments of Balochistan and NWFP and imposed martial law in those areas, which led to armed insurgency. Mir Hazar Khan Ramkhani formed the Balochistan People's Liberation Front (BPLF), which led large numbers of Marri and Mengal tribesmen into guerrilla warfare against the central government According to some authors, the Pakistani military lost around 3,300 men during the conflict with the Baloch separatists, while between 7,300 and 9,000 Baloch militants and civilians were killed.

Assisted by Iran, Pakistani forces inflicted heavy casualties on the separatists. The insurgency fell into decline after a return to the four-province structure and the abolishment of the Sardari system.

==== Fifth conflict 2004–to date ====
In 2004 an insurgent attack on Gwadar port resulting in the deaths of three Chinese engineers and four wounded drew China into the conflict. In 2005, the Baluch political leaders Nawab Akbar Khan Bugti and Mir Balach Marri presented a 15-point agenda to the Pakistan government. Their stated demands included greater control of the province's resources and a moratorium on the construction of military bases. On 15 December 2005 the inspector general of the Frontier Corps, Major General Shujaat Zamir Dar, and his deputy Brigadier Salim Nawaz (the current IGFC) were wounded after shots were fired at their helicopter in Balochistan Province. The provincial interior secretary later said that, after visiting Kohlu, "both of them were wounded in the leg but both are in stable condition."

In August 2006, Nawab Akbar Khan Bugti, 79 years old, was killed in fighting with the Pakistan Army, in which at least 60 Pakistani soldiers and 7 officers were also killed. Pakistan's government had charged him with responsibility of a series of deadly bomb blasts and a rocket attack on President Pervez Musharraf.

A 2006 cable from the American Embassy in Islamabad leaked by Wikileaks noted that "there seems to be little support in the province, beyond the Bugti tribe, for the current insurgency."

In April 2009, Baloch National Movement president Ghulam Mohammed Baloch and two other nationalist leaders (Lala Munir and Sher Muhammad) were seized from a small legal office and were allegedly "handcuffed, blindfolded and hustled into a waiting pickup truck which is in still [sic] use of intelligence forces in front of their lawyer and neighboring shopkeepers." The gunmen were allegedly speaking in Persian (a national language of neighbouring Afghanistan and Iran). Five days later, on 8 April, their bullet-riddled bodies were found in a commercial area. The BLA claimed Pakistani forces were behind the killings, though international experts have deemed it odd that the Pakistani forces would be careless enough to allow the bodies to be found so easily and "light Balochistan on fire" (Herald) if they were truly responsible. The discovery of the bodies sparked rioting and weeks of strikes, demonstrations, and civil resistance in cities and towns around Balochistan.

Reason for joining the separatist groups vary as some join them because of allure of power and excitement, a desire to honor their centuries-old tribal codes, gaining recognition for their region's distinct ethnicity or because of belief in hardline communism. Some even join the separatist group because their tribal leader told them to.

On 12 August 2009, Khan of Kalat Mir Suleiman Dawood declared himself ruler of Balochistan and formally announced a Council for Independent Balochistan. The council's claimed domain includes Sistan and Baluchestan Province, as well as Pakistani Balochistan, but does not include Afghan Baloch regions. The council claimed the allegiance of "all separatist leaders including Nawabzada Brahumdagh Bugti." Suleiman Dawood stated that the UK had a "moral responsibility to raise the issue of Balochistan's illegal occupation at international level."

Human right groups have accused Baloch separatist groups of being involved in grave human rights violations. Separatist groups such as the Balochistan Liberation Army have been involved in attacks on schools, teachers and students in the province. Baloch separatists have also accused these groups of being involved in widespread crimes such as rape against Baloch women. One Baloch separatist claims that what started as an idealistic political fight for his people's rights has turned into gangs extorting, kidnapping and even raping locals.

A survey in 2009 by PEW found that 58% of respondents in Balochistan chose "Pakistani" as their primary mode of identification, 32% chose their ethnicity and 10% chose both equally. A Gallup survey conducted in 2012 revealed that the majority of Baloch (67%) do not support independence from Pakistan. Only 33 percent of Baloch were in favour of independence. However, 67 percent of the people of Balochistan supported greater provincial autonomy.

== See also ==
- Balochistan conflict
- Paratarajas

== Bibliography ==
- Axmann, Martin (2008), Back to the Future: The Khanate of Kalat and the Genesis of Baloch Nationalism, 1915-1955, Oxford University Press, ISBN 978-0-19-547645-3
- Baloch, I. (1987). The Problem of "Greater Baluchistan": A Study of Baluch Nationalism. Coronet Books. ISBN 978-3-515-04999-3.
- Bangash, Yaqoob Khan (2015), "Constitutional integration of the princely states of Pakistan", in Roger D. Long; Ian Talbot; Gurharpal Singh; Yunas Samad (eds.), State and Nation-Building in Pakistan: Beyond Islam and Security, Routledge, ISBN 978-1-317-44820-4
- Bangash, Yaqoob Khan (2015), A Princely Affair: The Accession and Integration of the Princely States of Pakistan, 1947-1955, Oxford University Press, ISBN 9780199066490
- Collett, Nigel (2006). The Butcher of Amritsar: General Reginald Dyer. Continuum International Publishing Group. ISBN 1-85285-575-4.
- Khanam, Attiya (January–June 2016). "An Historical Overview of the Accession of Princely States" (PDF). Journal of Historical Studies. 2 (1): 97–98. Archived from the original (PDF) on 16 September 2024.
- Kosmin, Paul J. (2014). The Land of the Elephant Kings: Space, Territory, and Ideology in Seleucid Empire. Harvard University Press. ISBN 978-0-674-72882-0.
- Nicolini, Beatrice (2004), Makran, Oman, and Zanzibar: Three-Terminal Cultural Corridor in the Western Indian Ocean, 1799-1856, BRILL, ISBN 90-04-13780-7
- Siddiqi, Farhan Hanif (2012). The Politics of Ethnicity in Pakistan: The Baloch, Sindhi and Mohajir Ethnic Movements. Routledge. ISBN 978-1-136-33697-3.
- Talbot, Ian (1988), Provincial Politics and the Pakistan Movement: The Growth of Muslim League in North-West and North-East India, 1937-1947, Oxford University Press, pp. 117–119, ISBN 978-0-19-577387-3
