= Sherdil Khan =

Khan of Kalat (1863–1864)

Khan of Kalat
- Reign: 17 March 1863 – May 1864
- Predecessor: Khudadad Khan
- Successor: Khudadad Khan
- Died: May 1864

Mir Sherdil Khan was the Khan of Kalat from 1863 to 1864.

== Biography ==
During the minority of his cousin Khudadad Khan, and in the absence of Malcolm Green, the then Political Agent, the leading chiefs of the State of Kalat drove Khudadad out of Kalat. Afterward, they proclaimed Sherdil as the Khan of Kalat on 17 March 1863. The chiefs who had installed him sought to gain recognition for him from the British authorities at Jacobabad. However, the British refused to acknowledge him and withdrew their representative from Kalat. Upon seeing this, they approached Sardar Muhammad Amin, the Governor of Kandahar, requesting him to recognize him. In return for his recognition, they offered him the Shal (Quetta). However, he also demanded Mastung and Dhadar, due to which the agreement could not be finalized. When he failed to secure any form of recognition from them, he began to openly express his anti-British and anti-colonial views. This prompted the British to abandon their previously neutral stance in the dispute between Sherdil and his cousin Khudadad, and they began to support Khudadad's claim. The people who had installed him also began to shift their allegiance toward Khudadad.

He was murdered by his own guards in May 1864, and his cousin, Khudadad Khan, was reelected as Khan of Kalat.
