= Azam Jan Khan =

Khan of Kalat (1931 - 1933)

- Beglar Begi; Nawab Bahadur

Khan of Kalat
- Reign: December 1931 – 10 September 1933
- Investiture: 26 April 1932
- Predecessor: Mahmud Khan II
- Successor: Ahmad Yar Khan
- Born: 1870
- Died: 10 September 1933 (aged 62–63)
- Issue: Akram Jan; Ahmad Yar Khan; Abdul Rahim; Abdul Karim
- Father: Khudadad Khan

Mir Sir Azam Jan Khan GCIE (Balochi, Urdu: اعظم جان خان) was the Khan of Kalat from 1931 until his death in 1933.

== Early life and family ==
He was born about 1870 to Khudadad Khan. His mother was a Gichki. He served as commandant of the artillery regiment in the army of Kalat during his father’s reign. In 1893, when the Government of India deposed his father, they offered him the vacant throne of Kalat. He declined the offer, stating, “A father in prison and in exile, and his son on the vacant throne? My father did not bring me into this world for that purpose. I would rather share his fate and remain in exile like him than become the ruler of Kalat.” He subsequently went to Quetta in self-imposed exile.

He remained for a time in confinement at Loralai, from which, upon his release, he served for approximately six months as an assistant to the political agent at Zhob. He paid a visit to Quetta in December 1899 and, in February 1900, accompanied the political agent at Zhob on a brief visit to Lahore. He was sent in 1922 to govern Makran as its Nazim on behalf of his brother Mahmud Khan. He was granted an agricultural loan by the Government of India to enable him to purchase land and settle down. In addition, he received Rs. 1,800 per mensem from Mahmud Khan, Rs. 1,650 for himself, and Rs. 150 for the education of his sons. He had four sons: Akram Jan, Ahmad Yar Khan, Abdul Rahim, and Abdul Karim.

In 1920, his brother, Mahmud Khan, the then ruler of Kalat, became severely ill and was unable to govern. The Kalat State National Party negotiated with him, despite objections from the then prime minister of Kalat, Shams Shah, and brought him in to administer state affairs with the approval of the Government of India. He administered the affairs for nearly 17 months.

== Reign ==
When his brother Mahmud Khan died without leaving issue by a wife of position on 3 November 1931, the throne of Kalat became vacant. Azam Jan Khan succeeded him in December 1931, following the unanimous approval of his succession by the sardars of all Baluchistan, including those of the Barhui confederacy, of which he was the head, in accordance with ancient custom. One of the first actions he took was to replace Shams Shah with Gul Muhammad Khan as his new prime minister. On the occasion, he also abolished forced labour within his dominions. He also removed all existing restrictions on the movement of agricultural and other goods, and announced his intention to uphold the recently revised constitution of the enlarged council. He also announced that he would increase the number of schools and hospitals within his dominions and would work for the welfare of the people of Kachhi, who had become homeless due to years of neglect of irrigation sources. He fulfilled the promises he had made.

It was not until 26 April 1932 that Azam Jan Khan was formally installed. To officiate the installation, Lord Willingdon, the then Viceroy and Governor-General of India, and his wife, arrived in Quetta by air. It was the first occasion on which a Viceroy had arrived in Quetta by air, and also the first time a Viceroy had installed a Khan of Kalat. To commemorate the occasion, a durbar was held at the racecourse in Quetta. Azam Jan Khan, the Viceroy and Lady Willingdon were seated on golden thrones. The new Khan wore a white robe embroidered with gold, along with the traditional head-dress of his ancestors, studded with emeralds and other precious stones. A total of 200 nobles of Kalat attended the durbar.

== Death ==
He died on 10 September 1933 and was succeeded by his son, Ahmad Yar Khan, as the Khan of Kalat.

== Honours ==
He was appointed Knight Grand Commander of the Order of the Indian Empire on 3 June 1932 by George V. He was entitled to a salute of 21 guns as a personal distinction.
