= Kacchi (Kalat) =

Former political division in Baluchistan, Pakistan

Coordinates: 28°45′N 67°50′E

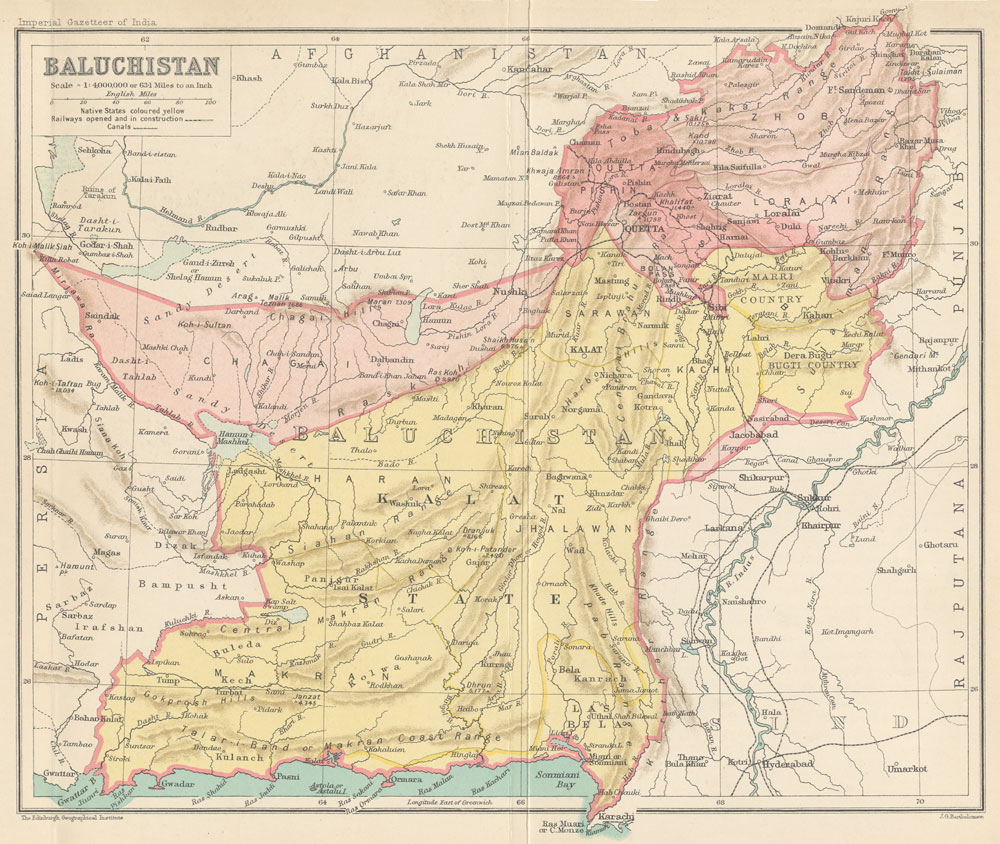
Map of the Baluchistan Agency.

Kacchi is a District in central Balochistan formerly called"Bolan District".

== History ==
The Kacchi is historically part of Sindh, with indigenous Sindhi population, the history of Kacchi is also closely connected with the history of Sindh. It was part of Rai, Chach, Soomra and Samma dynasties. In the 15th century the Baloch arrived and there were constant wars between their leaders Mir Chakar Rind and Mir Gwahram Khan Lashari. Then the area alongwith whole Sindh was taken over by the Arghuns, following which it came under the control of the Mughal Empire. Kacchi and Sibi were then parts of the Kalhora dynasty until in 1740 when Nadir Shah handed it over to the Khanate of Kalat as a blood compensation for the death of Mir Abdullah Khan Ahmadzai, in the Battle of Kachhi.

After the Independence of Pakistan, Kalat State became part of Pakistan and Kachhi District was notified as a district in February 1965.

== Demographics ==
Religious groups in Kacchi (Kalat) (British Baluchistan era)
Religious group	1911		1921		1931		1941	
Religious group	Pop.	%	Pop.	%	Pop.	%	Pop.	%
Islam	84,389	90.98%	68,144	90.67%	98,852	93.36%	79,016	91.76%
Hinduism	7,176	7.74%	7,009	9.33%	7,019	6.63%	7,095	8.24%
Sikhism	1,188	1.28%	0	0%	12	0.01%	1	0%
Christianity	6	0.01%	0	0%	1	0%	0	0%
Zoroastrianism	0	0%	0	0%	0	0%	0	0%
Judaism	0	0%	0	0%	0	0%	0	0%
Jainism	0	0%	0	0%	0	0%	0	0%
Buddhism	0	0%	0	0%	0	0%	0	0%
Tribal	—N/a	—N/a	—N/a	—N/a	0	0%	0	0%
Others	0	0%	0	0%	2	0%	0	0%
Total population	92,759	100%	75,153	100%	105,886	100%	86,112	100%

== See also ==
- Baluchistan Agency
- History of Balochistan
