= Siege of Kalat (1839) =

Battle of the First Anglo-Afghan War

Siege of Khelat
- Part of the First Anglo-Afghan War
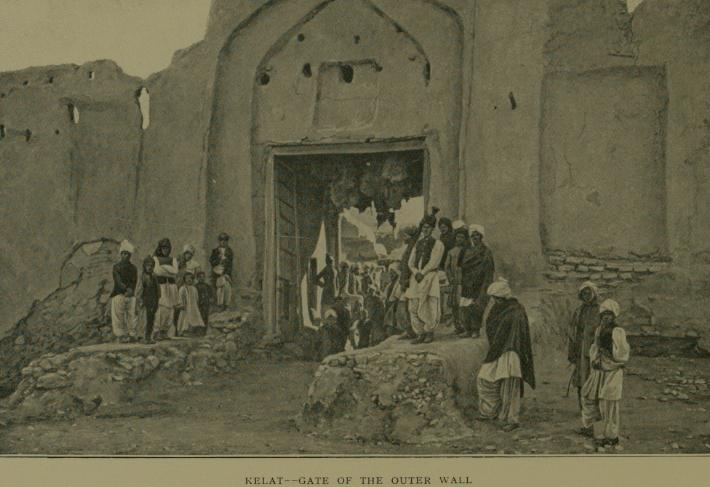
- Outer wall of Kalat city
| Date | 13 November 1839 |
| Location | Kalat, Pakistan |
| Result | British victory |

Belligerents
| British Empire; East India Company | Khanate of Kalat |

Commanders and leaders
| Thomas Willshire; James Outram | Mehrab Khan † |

Strength
| 1,166 | 2,000 |

Casualties and losses
| 31 killed 107 wounded | Unknown |

The siege of Kalat was a military campaign against the Khanate of Kalat led by the British during the First Anglo-Afghan War.

The fortress of Khelat, held by a Baluchi tribal chief, threatened communications with India through the Bolan Pass. The unfriendly Baluchi tribes had harassed and attacked British convoys and killed officers and camp followers alike during the First Anglo-Afghan War. This was in spite of a treaty of friendship signed by Sire Alexander Burnes (on behalf of George Eden, 1st Earl of Auckland) and the Mehrab Khan at Kalat on 28 March 1839.

As retaliation, the Bombay Column stormed the fortress on 13 November 1839 on its way back to India. British forces were commanded by Major General Thomas Willshire and the Kalat troops under Mehrab Khan. Mehrab Khan was killed in battle during the action.

== Battle honour ==
The honour was awarded vide GOGG dated 15 February 1840 and Bombay Government Order No 474 of 1841 and the spelling changed from 'Kelat' vide Gazette of India No 1079 of 1910. A non-repugnant honour, it was awarded to the following units:

- 4th Bengal Irregular Cavalry (now 1st Horse)
- Bombay Sappers & Miners (now the Bombay Engineer Group)
- 31st Bengal Infantry - later 1st Battalion, the Rajput Regiment, now the 4th Battalion, the Brigade of Guards)
