= Khanate of Kalat =

State in Balochistan, present day Pakistan

Coordinates: 29°01′33″N 66°35′24″E

Khanate of Kalat خانات قلات (Persian) کلاتءِ ھانات (Balochi) قلات خانات (Brahui)
- 1666–1955
- Flag

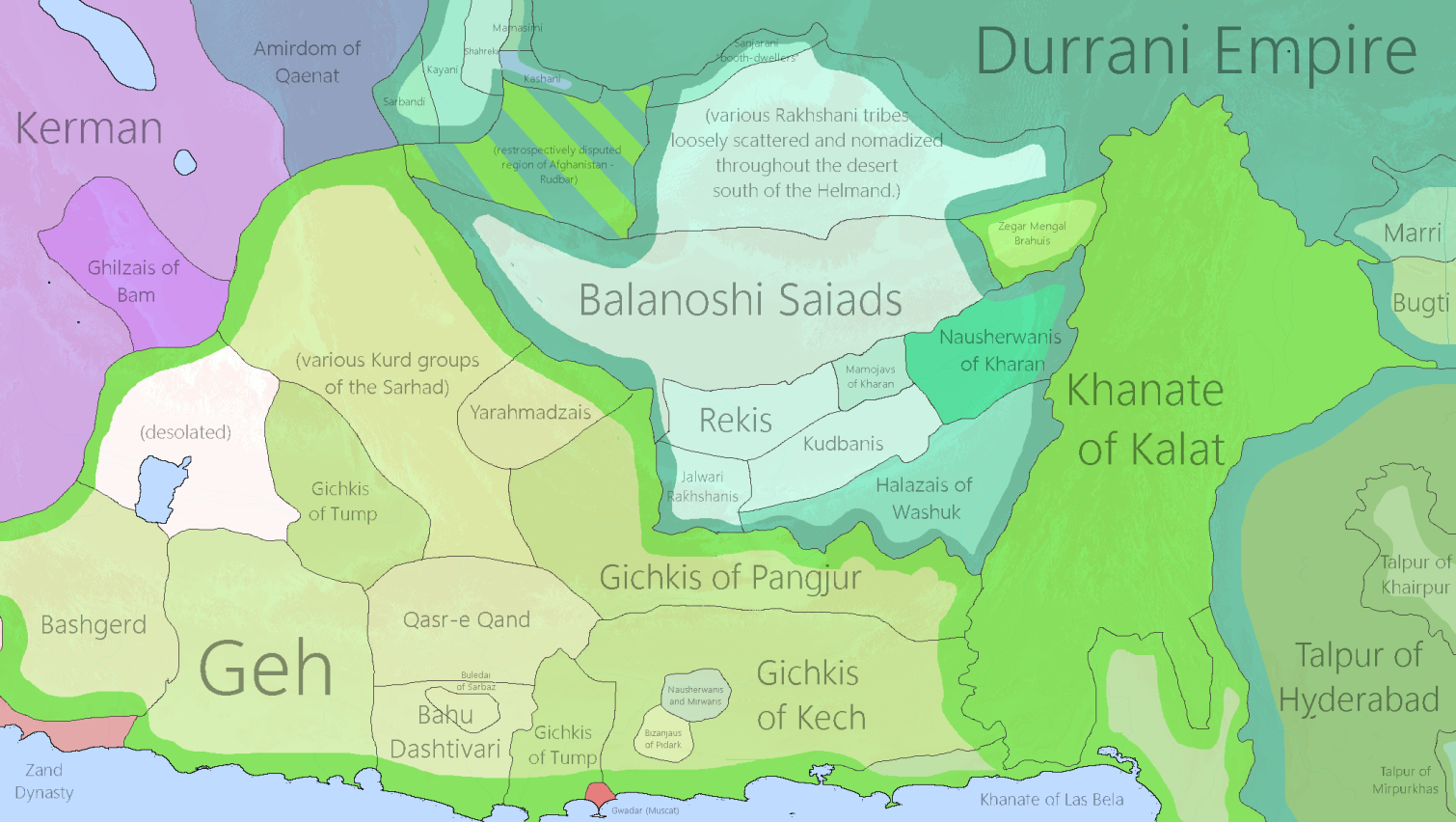
- Balochistan in the year 1789, including the Khanate of Kalat and states that are under its suzerainty.
- Status: Khanate
- Capital: Kalat
- Common languages: Persian (administration); Balochi (dynastic, court language); Brahui
- Religion: Islam; (official)
- Government: Hereditary monarchy
- Khan
  - 1656–1666 (first): Altaz Khan II Qambrani
  - 1933–1955 (last): Ahmad Yar Khan Ahmadzai
- Historical era: Early Modern Period
  - Established: 1666
  - Siege of Kalat: 13 November 1839
  - Treaty of Kalat: 8 December 1876
  - declaration of independence: 11 August 1947
  - Accession: 27 March 1948
  - Disestablished: 1955

Area
- 1835: 560,000 km^{2} (220,000 sq mi)
- 1940: 139,850 km^{2} (54,000 sq mi)
Preceded by
Mughal Empire
Afsharid Iran
Succeeded by
Balochistan States Union
Qajar Iran
Emirate of Afghanistan
- Today part of: Pakistan; Iran; Afghanistan

The Khanate of Kalat, also known as the Brahui Confederacy, was a khanate that originated in the modern-day Kalat region of Pakistan, and was ruled by the Brahui Ahmadzai dynasty. Formed in 1666 due to the threat of Mughal expansion in the region, it controlled the wider Balochistan region at its greatest extent in the mid-18th century, extending from Kerman in the west to Sindh in the east and from Helmand River in the north to the Arabian Sea in the south.

The Khanate of Kalat lost considerable area to Qajar Iran and the Emirate of Afghanistan in the early 19th century, and the city of Kalat was itself sacked by the British in 1839. Kalat became a self-governing state in a subsidiary alliance with British India after the signature of the Treaty of Kalat by the Khan of Kalat and local sardars in 1875, and the supervision of Kalat became a task of the Baluchistan Agency. Kalat was briefly independent from 12 August 1947 until 27 March 1948, when its ruler Ahmad Yar Khan acceded to Pakistan, making it one of the princely states of Pakistan.

== Origins ==
The Khanate of Kalat was the first unified polity to emerge in the history of Balochistan. It took birth in 1666 from the confederacy of nomadic Brahui tribes, which under Mir Ahmad Khan I declared independence from the Mughal suzerainty, and slowly absorbed other principalities in the region.

== History ==
=== Background ===
According to the local traditions, Kalat was originally ruled by a Hindu ruler named Sewa, hence it was also known as Kalat-e-Sewa. Historically, the areas surrounding Kalat were a part of the Mughal province of Kandahar during the 17th century. During the reign of Shah Jahan, Mughal expansion reached its high point, and caused the emergence for the first time a unified Brahui Confederacy or what would be later known as the Khanate of Kalat.

=== Establishment ===
The first ruler of the khanate was Mir Ahmad Khan I (r. 1666–1695). He was strong enough to capture Quetta, Mastung, and Pishin from the Mughal governor at Kandahar. He spent his life fighting the Afghans and Kalhoras of Sindh, and became an ally of Mughal emperor Aurangzeb. During the reign of his successor, Mir Samandar Khan (r. 1697–1714), He expanded the state till Karachi. During his reign, a Safavid army under Tahmasb Beg invaded western Balochistan. Safavids were defeated, and Tahmasb was killed. Samandar Khan was rewarded by Mughals with the gift of port of Karachi.

Under Mir Abdullah Khan (r. 1716–1731), the state expanded from upper Sindh and Kandahar to Persia till the port of Bandar Abbas. He was later killed while fighting against an allied army of Hussain Hotak of Hotak dynasty and the Kalhoras in 1734. His son and successor, Mir Mehrab Khan (r. 1734–1749), was given the region of Kacchi, then under Kalhoras, by Nader Shah as blood compensation of his father.

The Khanate reached its peak during the reign of Mir Nasir Khan I (r. 1749–1794), who had unified the Kalat region and conquered cities of Khash, Bampur, Qasr-e Qand and Zahedan in the Iranian Balochistan. Since 1748, Kalat was a vassal state of Durrani Empire, and Mir Nasir Khan assisted in the campaigns of Ahmad Shah such as in the Durrani campaign to Khorasan. However, in 1758 Mir Nasir Khan revolted against Ahmad Shah. The Afghans were dispatched under vizier Shah Wali Khan to Kalat, but were defeated. As a result, Ahmad Shah marched himself with an army and defeated the Baloch armies in the battle.

Ahmad Shah laid siege to Kalat for over 40 days, and attempted to storm it, however it was unsuccessful. In the ensuing 1758 treaty of Kalat, the exact agreements are disputed. Some sources state that the Khanate of Kalat became a sovereign state. According to some other accounts, Mir Nasir Khan had recognized suzerainty of Ahmad Shah, who guaranteed non-interference in the matters of Kalat. Nevertheless, Kalat did not pay any tribute to Durrani Empire thereafter, and provided military contingents in exchange of money only. Following the collapse of the Durranis, any trace of Afghan influence over Kalat ended after the death of Sher Dil Khan, the ruler of the principality of Kandahar, in 1826.

Mir Nasir Khan, also known by his epithet, "The Great", undertook 25 military campaigns during his reign, and forced the Talpur dynasty of Sindh to pay tribute. He was the first Khan of Kalat to establish a centralized bureaucracy and issue own currency. He established the office of grand vizier to look after the affairs of the state, as well as a standing army. He had also established diplomatic relations with Ottoman Turkey, Iran, Afghanistan and Sultanate of Oman. In 1784, he gave refuge to the future Sultan of Oman, Sultan bin Ahmad, and gifted him the port of Gwadar. Gwadar continued to be part of Sultanate of Oman until it was purchased by Pakistan in 1958. Due to his achievements, he is considered a central figure and hero among the Brahuis as well as the Baloch.

=== Decline ===
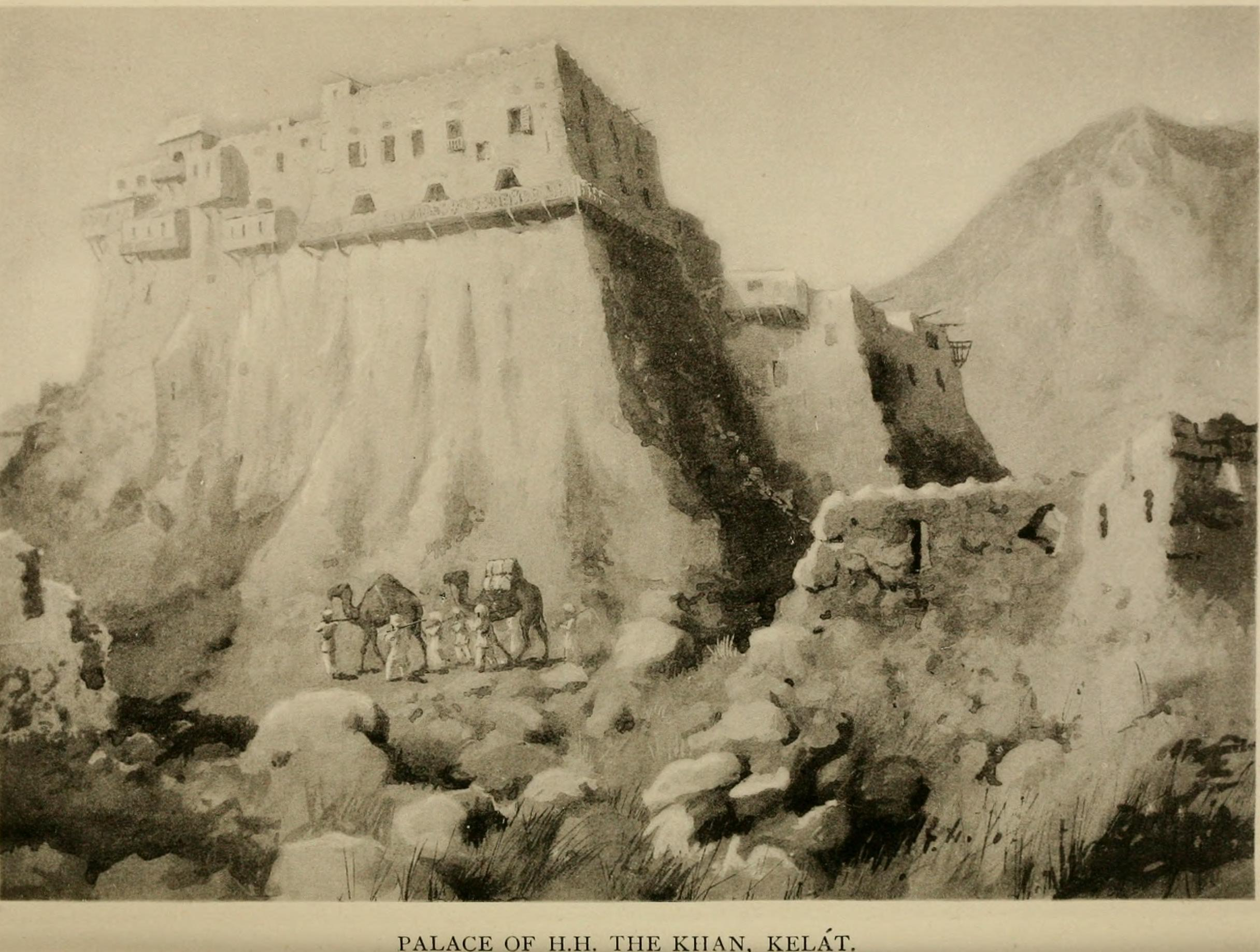
Palace of Mir Khudadad, Khan of Kalat.

The Khanate of Kalat declined in the early 19th century, losing much of its territory to Qajar Iran and Emirate of Afghanistan. The internal weakness of the state forced Khan of Kalat to sign the Treaty of Kalat (1876) with the British Agent Robert Sandeman in the late 19th century. Parts of the state to the north and northeast were leased or ceded to form the province of British Baluchistan, which later gained the status of a Chief Commissioners province. The Iran–Kalat border was demarcated in 1896, and the former territories of Kalat Khanate now form part of Iranian province of Sistan and Balochistan.

=== Accession ===
With the withdrawal of the British from the South Asia in 1947, the Indian Independence Act provided that the princely states which had existed alongside but outside British India were released from all their subsidiary alliances and other treaty obligations. The rulers were left to decide whether to accede to one of the newly independent states of India or Pakistan (both formed initially from the British possessions) or to remain independent outside both. As stated by Sardar Patel, "On the lapse of Paramountcy every Indian State became a separate independent entity."

The Instruments of Accession made available for the rulers to sign transferred only limited powers, namely external relations, defence, and communications. The Shahi Jirga of Baluchistan and the non-official members of the Quetta Municipality, according to Pervaiz Iqbal Cheema, stated their wish to join Pakistan on 29 June 1947; however, according to the political scientist Rafi Sheikh, the Shahi Jirga was stripped of its members from the Kalat State prior to the vote.

The princely state of Kalat acceded to the Dominion of Pakistan on 27 March 1948. The accession was accepted by the Governor General Muhammad Ali Jinnah on 31 March, making Kalat a part of Pakistan. The accession was a stormy affair. Kalat had remained independent from 11 August 1947 until its accession under Ahmad Yar Khan (1904–1979), becoming the last of the rulers to do so. Show elections were held during this period and a bicameral parliament was established. On the night of 27 March, All India Radio carried a story about Yar Khan approaching India with an unsuccessful request for accession in around February. The next morning, Yar Khan put out a public broadcast rejecting its veracity and declaring an immediate accession to Pakistan — all remaining differences were to be placed before Jinnah, whose decision would be binding.

Dushka H. Saiyid emphasizes that Yar Khan lost all of his bargaining chips with the accession of Kharan, Las Bela, and Makran, leaving Kalat as an island. Salman Rafi Sheikh largely concurs with Saiyid's assessment: multiple other Kalat sardars were preparing to accede to Pakistan and Yar Khan would have hardly any territory left, if he did not accede.

On 3 October 1952, the state of Kalat entered into the Baluchistan States Union with three neighbouring states, Kharan, Las Bela, and Makran, with Yar Khan of Kalat at the head of the Union with the title of Khan-e-Azam. The Khanate came to an end on 14 October 1955, when it was incorporated into West Pakistan.

== Language and Literature ==
The Khans of Kalat used the title of ḵān-e balōč, and the language used in their household was Balochi, even though the dynastic language was Brahui. In the court of Mir Nasir Khan I, Mullah Malikdad Qalati translated a Persian work into Brahui as Tuḥfat al-ʿAjāʾib which contained some 1,275 couplets. This work was republished in 1916.

Persian was the administrative and the communication language of the khanate for state business. Writers in the era of the khanate of Kalat have enriched the Balochi language and literature by writing several books of prose. Jām Durrak, the chief poet of the court of Mir Nasir Khan I composed wrote songs and love poems in Balochi, some of it has been collected and published The political centralization of the Khanate of Kalat failed to survive through the colonial era and did not lead to the standardization of the Balochi language.

== Geography ==
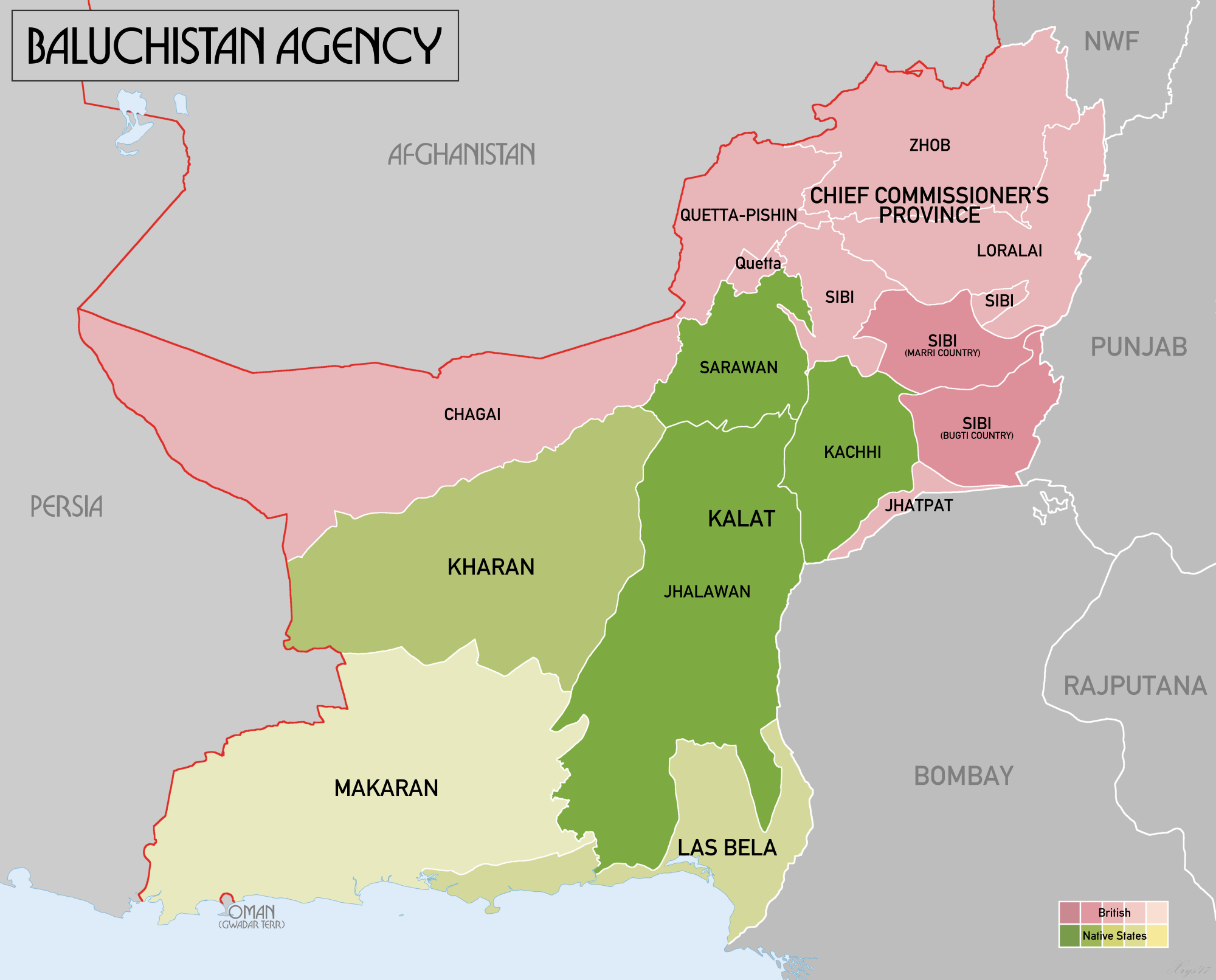
Khanate of Kalat (dark green) in Baluchistan Agency (1931)

The Khanate of Kalat covered the area of 139,850 km^{2} (53,995 sq mi). The territories of the Khanate of Kalat flactuated throughout its history. At the time of death of Mir Nasir Khan I in 1794, it comprised the Iranian Balochistan, parts of Sindh and Afghan Balochistan as far as the Helmand River. Significantly reduced in the late 19th century, the princely state of Kalat occupied the central part of the territory of modern-day Balochistan province in Pakistan. To the north was the Baluchistan (Chief Commissioner's Province), part of British India.

=== Administration ===
Kalat state was divided into following sub-divisions:

- Jhalawan, an ethnic Brahui subdivision, headed by the chief nawab of the Zehri tribe, known as Chief of Jhalawan.
- Kacchi, in which various tribes had their own tribal lands under the Khan of Kalat.
- Sarawan, an ethnic Baloch subdivision, headed by chief nawab of Raisani tribe, called Chief of Sarawan.

== Demographics ==
Religious groups in Kalat State (British Baluchistan era)
Religious group	1901		1911		1921		1931		1941	
Religious group	Pop.	%	Pop.	%	Pop.	%	Pop.	%	Pop.	%
Islam	393,667	96.61%	345,906	96.33%	316,985	96.56%	331,234	96.82%	245,208	96.8%
Hinduism	13,780	3.38%	10,102	2.81%	11,205	3.41%	10,806	3.16%	7,971	3.15%
Sikhism	25	0.01%	3,022	0.84%	78	0.02%	42	0.01%	79	0.03%
Christianity	0	0%	51	0.01%	13	0%	15	0%	45	0.02%
Zoroastrianism	0	0%	4	0%	0	0%	0	0%	1	0%
Judaism	0	0%	0	0%	0	0%	2	0%	1	0%
Jainism	0	0%	0	0%	0	0%	0	0%	0	0%
Buddhism	—N/a	—N/a	1	0%	0	0%	0	0%	0	0%
Tribal	—N/a	—N/a	—N/a	—N/a	—N/a	—N/a	0	0%	0	0%
Others	0	0%	0	0%	0	0%	2	0%	0	0%
Total population	407,472	100%	359,086	100%	328,281	100%	342,101	100%	253,305	100%
Note: 1901–1931: Including the divisions of Sarawan, Jhalawan, Kachhi, Dombki-Kaheri Country, Makran, and Kharan. 1941: Including the divisions of Sarawan, Jhalawan, Kachhi, and Makran.

=== Sarawan Division ===
Religious groups in the Sarawan Division of Kalat State (British Baluchistan era)
Religious group	1911		1921		1931		1941	
Religious group	Pop.	%	Pop.	%	Pop.	%	Pop.	%
Islam	62,660	98.24%	53,304	98.23%	27,722	97.39%	27,592	97.6%
Hinduism	1,003	1.57%	896	1.65%	729	2.56%	592	2.09%
Sikhism	113	0.18%	60	0.11%	10	0.04%	61	0.22%
Christianity	5	0.01%	2	0%	3	0.01%	25	0.09%
Zoroastrianism	0	0%	0	0%	0	0%	0	0%
Judaism	0	0%	0	0%	0	0%	0	0%
Jainism	0	0%	0	0%	0	0%	0	0%
Buddhism	0	0%	0	0%	0	0%	0	0%
Tribal	—N/a	—N/a	—N/a	—N/a	0	0%	0	0%
Others	0	0%	0	0%	0	0%	0	0%
Total population	63,781	100%	54,262	100%	28,464	100%	28,270	100%

=== Jhalawan Division ===
Religious groups in the Jhalawan Division of Kalat State (British Baluchistan era)
Religious group	1911		1921		1931		1941	
Religious group	Pop.	%	Pop.	%	Pop.	%	Pop.	%
Islam	83,914	99.43%	79,293	99.48%	88,780	99.78%	52,194	99.85%
Hinduism	472	0.56%	417	0.52%	197	0.22%	78	0.15%
Sikhism	12	0.01%	0	0%	1	0%	0	0%
Christianity	0	0%	0	0%	0	0%	0	0%
Zoroastrianism	0	0%	0	0%	0	0%	0	0%
Judaism	0	0%	0	0%	0	0%	0	0%
Jainism	0	0%	0	0%	0	0%	0	0%
Buddhism	0	0%	0	0%	0	0%	0	0%
Tribal	—N/a	—N/a	—N/a	—N/a	0	0%	0	0%
Others	0	0%	0	0%	0	0%	0	0%
Total population	84,398	100%	79,710	100%	88,978	100%	52,272	100%

=== Kachhi Division ===
Religious groups in the Kachhi Division of Kalat State (British Baluchistan era)
Religious group	1911		1921		1931		1941	
Religious group	Pop.	%	Pop.	%	Pop.	%	Pop.	%
Islam	84,389	90.98%	68,144	90.67%	98,852	93.36%	79,016	91.76%
Hinduism	7,176	7.74%	7,009	9.33%	7,019	6.63%	7,095	8.24%
Sikhism	1,188	1.28%	0	0%	12	0.01%	1	0%
Christianity	6	0.01%	0	0%	1	0%	0	0%
Zoroastrianism	0	0%	0	0%	0	0%	0	0%
Judaism	0	0%	0	0%	0	0%	0	0%
Jainism	0	0%	0	0%	0	0%	0	0%
Buddhism	0	0%	0	0%	0	0%	0	0%
Tribal	—N/a	—N/a	—N/a	—N/a	0	0%	0	0%
Others	0	0%	0	0%	2	0%	0	0%
Total population	92,759	100%	75,153	100%	105,886	100%	86,112	100%

=== Dombki-Kaheri Country Division ===
Religious groups in the Dombki-Kaheri Country Division of Kalat State (British Baluchistan era)
Religious group	1911		1921		1931	
Religious group	Pop.	%	Pop.	%	Pop.	%
Islam	20,574	87.39%	16,937	86.6%	24,349	90.34%
Sikhism	1,707	7.25%	10	0.05%	16	0.06%
Hinduism	1,262	5.36%	2,611	13.35%	2,588	9.6%
Christianity	0	0%	0	0%	0	0%
Zoroastrianism	0	0%	0	0%	0	0%
Judaism	0	0%	0	0%	0	0%
Jainism	0	0%	0	0%	0	0%
Buddhism	0	0%	0	0%	0	0%
Tribal	—N/a	—N/a	—N/a	—N/a	0	0%
Others	0	0%	0	0%	0	0%
Total population	23,543	100%	19,558	100%	26,953	100%
Note: Much of the Dombki-Kaheri Country division was transferred to the administered areas of Sibi District between the 1931 and 1941 census.

=== Makran Division ===
Religious groups in the Makran Division of Kalat State (British Baluchistan era)
Religious group	1911		1921		1931		1941	
Religious group	Pop.	%	Pop.	%	Pop.	%	Pop.	%
Islam	71,758	99.74%	71,625	99.67%	68,213	99.64%	86,406	99.72%
Hinduism	137	0.19%	216	0.3%	233	0.34%	206	0.24%
Christianity	40	0.06%	11	0.02%	11	0.02%	20	0.02%
Sikhism	2	0%	8	0.01%	3	0%	17	0.02%
Zoroastrianism	4	0.01%	0	0%	0	0%	1	0%
Buddhism	1	0%	0	0%	0	0%	0	0%
Judaism	0	0%	0	0%	2	0%	1	0%
Jainism	0	0%	0	0%	0	0%	0	0%
Tribal	—N/a	—N/a	—N/a	—N/a	0	0%	0	0%
Others	0	0%	0	0%	0	0%	0	0%
Total population	71,942	100%	71,860	100%	68,462	100%	86,651	100%

=== Kharan Division ===
Religious groups in the Kharan Division of Kalat State (British Baluchistan era)
Religious group	1911		1921		1931	
Religious group	Pop.	%	Pop.	%	Pop.	%
Islam	22,611	99.77%	27,682	99.8%	23,318	99.83%
Hinduism	52	0.23%	56	0.2%	40	0.17%
Sikhism	0	0%	0	0%	0	0%
Christianity	0	0%	0	0%	0	0%
Zoroastrianism	0	0%	0	0%	0	0%
Judaism	0	0%	0	0%	0	0%
Jainism	0	0%	0	0%	0	0%
Buddhism	0	0%	0	0%	0	0%
Tribal	—N/a	—N/a	—N/a	—N/a	0	0%
Others	0	0%	0	0%	0	0%
Total population	22,663	100%	27,738	100%	23,358	100%
Note: The Kharan division was divided from the Kalat princely state between the 1931 and 1941 censuses to become a separate princely state.

== Rulers of Kalat ==
The rulers of Kalat at first held the title of Wali but in 1739 also took the title of (Begler Begi Khan), usually shortened to Khan. The last Khan of Kalat (Balochi: خان قلات) had the privilege of being the President of the Council of Rulers for the Baluchistan States Union. They also had the title of beylerbey.

Tenure	Khan of Kalat
1656–1666	Mir Altaz Sani Khan Qambrani II
1666–1695	Mir Ahmad I Khan Qambrani III (Changed his Royal family name from Qambrani to Ahmadzai )
1695–1697	Mir Mehrab Khan Ahmadzai I
1697–1714	Mir Samandar Khan Ahmadzai
1714–1716	Mir Ahmad II Khan Ahmadzai
1716–1731	Mir Abdullah Khan Ahmadzai
1731–1749	Mir Muhabbat Khan Ahmadzai
1749–1794	Mir Muhammad Nasir Khan I Ahmadzai
1794–1817	Mir Mahmud Khan I Ahmadzai
1817–1839	Mir Mehrab Khan Ahmadzai II
1839–1841	Mir Shah Nawaz Khan Ahmadzai
1841–1857	Mir Nasir Khan II Ahmadzai
1857–1863	Mir Khudadad Khan Ahmadzai (1st time)
1863–1864	Mir Sherdil Khan Ahmadzai (usurped throne)
1864–1893	Mir Khudadad Khan Ahmadzai (2nd time)
1893–1931	Mir Mahmud Khan II Ahmadzai
1931–1933	Mir Mohammad Azam Jan Khan Ahmadzai
1933–1955	Ahmad of Kalat (Mir Ahmad Yar Khan Ahmadzai); declared independent on 12 August 1947; acceded to Pakistan on 27 March 1948, while keeping internal self-government
14 October 1955	State of Kalat merged into One Unit of West Pakistan
1955–1979	Mir Ahmad Yar Khan Ahmadzai (titular)
1979–1998	Mir Dawood Jan Ahmadzai (titular)
1998–2006	Mir Agha Sulaiman Jan Ahmadzai (titular)
2006–present	Prince Mir Mohammad Khan Ahmadzai (titular)

== See also ==
- Kalat State National Party
- List of princely states of British India

== Bibliography ==
- Axmann, Martin (2019). "Kalāt, khānate of". In Fleet, Kate; Krämer, Gudrun; Matringe, Denis; Nawas, John; Rowson, Everett (eds.). Encyclopaedia of Islam (3rd ed.). Brill Online. ISSN 1873-9830.
- Breseeg, Taj Mohammad (2004). Baloch Nationalism: Its Origin and Development. Royal Book Company. ISBN 978-969-407-309-5.
- Siddiqi, Farhan Hanif (2012), The Politics of Ethnicity in Pakistan: The Baloch, Sindhi and Mohajir Ethnic Movements, Routledge, ISBN 978-0-415-68614-3
- Khan, Sabir Badal (2013). Two Essays on Baloch History and Folklore: Two Essays on Baloch History and Folklore. Università di Napoli, "l'Orientale".
- Malik, Fida Hussain (2020). Balochistan A Conflict of Narratives. Saiyid Books. ISBN 9789692200028.
- Webb, Matthew J. (4 October 2016). Separatist Violence in South Asia: A comparative study. Taylor & Francis. p. 318. ISBN 978-1-317-39312-2. "Baloch separatism, for example, can be traced back to 1758, when Nasir Khan of Kalat won sovereign status from the Afghan empire..."
- Banuazizi, Ali; Weiner, Myron (1 August 1988). The State, Religion, and Ethnic Politics: Afghanistan, Iran, and Pakistan. Syracuse University Press. p. 273. ISBN 978-0-8156-2448-6. "Once he had established his army on a solid basis, however, Nasir Khan took on the Afghans militarily, fighting Ahmad Shah Durrani's forces to a standstill in 1758. Thereafter, Kalat enjoyed sovereign status until the arrival of the British..."
- Khan Jalalzai, Musa (2003). The Foreign Policy of Afghanistan. Sang-e-Meel Publications. p. 33. ISBN 9789693513998.
- Gulzad, Zulmay (1994). External Influences and the Development of the Afghan State in the Nineteenth Century. P. Lang. p. 31. ISBN 9780820424576.
- Balland, D (15 December 1983). "AFGHANISTAN x. Political History". In Yarshater, Ehsan (ed.). Encyclopædia Iranica. Vol. I/5: Adat–Afghanistan. London and New York: Routledge & Kegan Paul. pp. 547–558. ISBN 978-0-71009-094-2. "The political convulsions of the last years of the 18th century and the first quarter of the 19th century had led to the empire's dismemberment. A Qajar offensive resulted in the loss of western Khorasan (1209/1795) and a direct threat to Herat, which was besieged in 1249/1833 and in 1253/1837. To the north of the Hindu Kush, various Uzbek principalities entered the orbit of khanate of Bokhara. In the south, the khanate of Kalāt became independent."
- Lee, Jonathan (2019). Afghanistan: A History from 1260 to the Present. Reaktion Books. p. 126. ISBN 9781789140101. "Following the loss of the Punjab, Nasir Khan, beglar begi of Kalat, convinced that these defeats marked the beginning of the end of Durrani power, declared independence. Sardar Shah Wali Khan was sent to put down the revolt, but when he was defeated Ahmad Shah set out in person to deal with the troublesome governor. He eventually defeated the Baluch army but was unable to take Kalat by storm. Instead, he agreed to allow Nasir Khan to remain as governor of Kalat in return for his resubmission to Durrani sovereignty"
- Whitaker, Joseph (1951). Whitaker's Almanack 1951, vol. 83. "the following States have also acceded to Pakistan : Kalat, area 53,995 square miles [139,850 square kilometres], pop. 253.305..."
- Elfenbein, Josef (1989). "Brahui". In Yarshater, Ehsan (ed.). Encyclopædia Iranica. Vol. IV/4: Bolbol I–Brick. London and New York: Routledge & Kegan Paul. pp. 433–443. ISBN 978-0-71009-127-7.
- Elfenbein, Josef (1988). "BALUCHISTAN iii. Baluchi Language and Literature". In Yarshater, Ehsan (ed.). Encyclopædia Iranica. Vol. III/6: Baḵtīārī tribe II–Banān. London and New York: Routledge & Kegan Paul. ISBN 978-0-71009-118-5.
- Khan Durrani, Ashiq Muhammad (1991). "The People of Afghanistan: Relations between the Sadozais and the Ahmadzais of Qalat". ProQuest: 139 – via Google drive. "The Afghan army besieged the Qalat fort and the siege lasted for forty days. The Afghans failed to capture it. Ultimately through the good offices of the Wazir Shah Wali Khan a peace treaty was concluded. Mir Nasir Khan came to Ahmad Shah and apologized for his misdeeds. According to the treaty Mir Nasir Khan accepted the suzerainty of the Afghan king. Ahmad Shah agreed that Mir Nasir Khan should pay no tribute, but should furnish, when called upon a contingent of troops sending them at his own cost to the royal camp."
- Dani, Ahmad Hasan (2003). History of Civilizations of Central Asia: Development in contrast : from the sixteenth to the mid-nineteenth century. UNESCO. p. 289. ISBN 9789231038761. "Nasir Khan had accompanied Ahmad Shah in three campaigns in India and is said to have performed his duties well and loyally. But in 1758, on hearing the Marathas had conquered Punjab and ousted the Afghans from that province, he declared his independence. In the summer of 1758, Ahmad Shah advanced into Baluchistan. He met considerable resistance. According to a local chronicle, the small fortress of Kalat detained the Shah for 40 days. Ultimately, Nasir Khan was forced to submit. He was allowed his domains on condition he acknowledged the shah's sovereignty and furnished contingents for his campaigns. The Baluch chief was exempted from the annual tax and tribute."
- Spooner, Brian J. (1988). "Baluchistan i. Geography, History and Ethnography". In Yarshater, Ehsan (ed.). Encyclopædia Iranica. Vol. III/6: Baḵtīārī tribe II–Banān. London and New York: Routledge & Kegan Paul. pp. 598–632. doi:10.1163/2330-4804_EIRO_COM_6516. ISBN 978-0-71009-118-5.
- Spooner, Brian (2012). Schiffman, Harold F. (ed.). "Balochi: Towards a Biography of the Language". Language Policy and Language Conflict in Afghanistan and Its Neighbors: The Changing Politics of Language Choice. Leiden, Boston: Brill: 319-336. ISBN 978-9004201453.
- Saiyid, Dushka H (2006). "The Accession of Kalat: Myth and Reality". Strategic Studies. 26 (3): 26–45. ISSN 1029-0990. JSTOR 45242356.
- Sedighi, Anousha (2023). Iranian and Minority Languages at Home and in Diaspora. De Gruyter. ISBN 9783110694314.
- Baloch, Mir Naseer Khan Ahmadzai Kambarani (2023). A History of the Baloch and Balochistan. ASIN B0D66DTRMW.
- Baloch, Ghulam Farooq (2011). "Treaty of Kalat between Balochistan and Afghanistan in 1758" (PDF). Archived from the original (PDF) on 4 March 2016.
- Baluchistan. Digital South Asia Library: Imperial Gazetteer of India.
- Khan, Adeel (2005). Politics of Identity. SAGE Publications. ISBN 9780761933045.
- Harrison, Selig S. (1981), In Afghanistan's Shadow: Baluch Nationalism and Soviet Temptations, Carnegie Endowment for International Peace, p. 24, ISBN 978-0-87003-029-1, "Pakistani leaders summarily rejected this declaration [of independence], touching off a nine-month diplomatic tug of war that came to a climax in the forcible annexation of Kalat... But it is clear that Baluch leaders, including the Khan, were bitterly opposed to what happened... Moreover, the Pakistani version of the accession debate is discredited by a study of the discussion of the Kalat Assembly on the accession issue and by interviews with a variety of Baluch leaders that confirm the authenticity of the official assembly proceedings."
- Amirali, Alia (2015), "Balochistan: A Case Study of Pakistan's Peacemaking Praxis (Volume III)", in Rita Manchanda (ed.), SAGE Series in Human Rights Audits of Peace Processes, SAGE Publications, pp. 22–23, ISBN 978-93-5150-213-5, "Seven months later, on 27 March 1948, Kalat acceded to Pakistan. Whether it was a willing accession or a coerced one is a disputed matter, with pro-state historians arguing that the Khan willingly made the decision to accede, and nationalist scholars maintaining that Balochistan was annexed. However, what is certain is that it was an unpopular decision, and sparked the first revolt led by the Khan of Kalat's brother (see also the next section in this chapter). The Pakistan Army, which had already been sent in to Kalat, put down the rebellion."
- Hanifi, Shah Mahmoud (2019). Mountstuart Elphinstone in South Asia. Oxford University Press. p. 143. ISBN 9780190914400.
- Windfuhr, Gernot (2013). The Iranian Languages. Taylor & Francis. pp. 635–636. ISBN 9781135797041.
- Malik, Samaddar (2007). The Materiality of Politics: Volume 1. Anthem Press. p. 37. ISBN 978-1-84331-765-4.
- Cheema, Pervaiz Iqbal; Riemer, Manuel (22 August 1990). Pakistan's Defence Policy 1947–58. Palgrave Macmillan UK. ISBN 978-1-349-20942-2.
- Sheikh, Salman Rafi (2018). The Genesis of Baloch Nationalism: Politics and Ethnicity in Pakistan, 1947–1977. Taylor & Francis. ISBN 978-1-351-02068-8.
- Ahmed, Ishtiaq (1998). State, Nation and Ethnicity in Contemporary South Asia. London & New York.
