= Treaty of Kalat =

The Treaty of Kalat (Urdu: معاہدہ قلات) was an 1875 agreement between the British Raj and the Baloch tribes bordering the Punjab region in modern-day Pakistan.

Negotiated by British chargé d'affaires Robert Groves Sandeman, the treaty reconciled the warring tribes of the region with their Khan and recognised the direct rule of the British over the Khanate of Kalat.

The subsequent treaty was signed by the Khan and the Viceroy of India, Lord Lytton in 8 December 1876 at Jacobabad in modern-day Sindh, Pakistan.

== See also ==
- Baluchistan Agency

== Bibliography ==
- Lethbridge, Sir Roper (1893). The Golden Book of India: A Genealogical and Biographical Dictionary of the Ruling Princes, Chiefs, Nobles, and Other Personages, Titled Or Decorated of the Indian Empire. Aakar Books. ISBN 978-81-87879-54-1.
- Baloch, Dr. Mumtaz; Abdul, Saeed; Muhammad Javed, Sarparah; Chaker, Hyder (2019). "The Treaty of 1876: A Case Study of British Occupation of Balochistan" (PDF). Bi-Annual Research Journal “BALOCHISTAN REVIEW”. XL NO. 1 (Balochistan Study Centre, University of Balochistan, Quetta (Pakistan)). ISSN 1810-2174.
- Dashti, Naseer (2012). The Baloch and Balochistan: A Historical Account from the Beginning to the Fall of the Baloch State. Trafford Publishing. ISBN 978-1-4669-5896-8.
- Wheeler, Mortimer (1960). The Cambridge History of India. CUP Archive. GGKEY:GPJ313BQ1AH.
