= Ahmad of Kalat =

Final Khan of Kalat from 1933–1955

Khan Mir Sir Ahmad Yar Khan Ahmedzai, GCIE
- احمد یار خان احمدزئی (Urdu) احمد يار خان احمدزى (Baluchi)
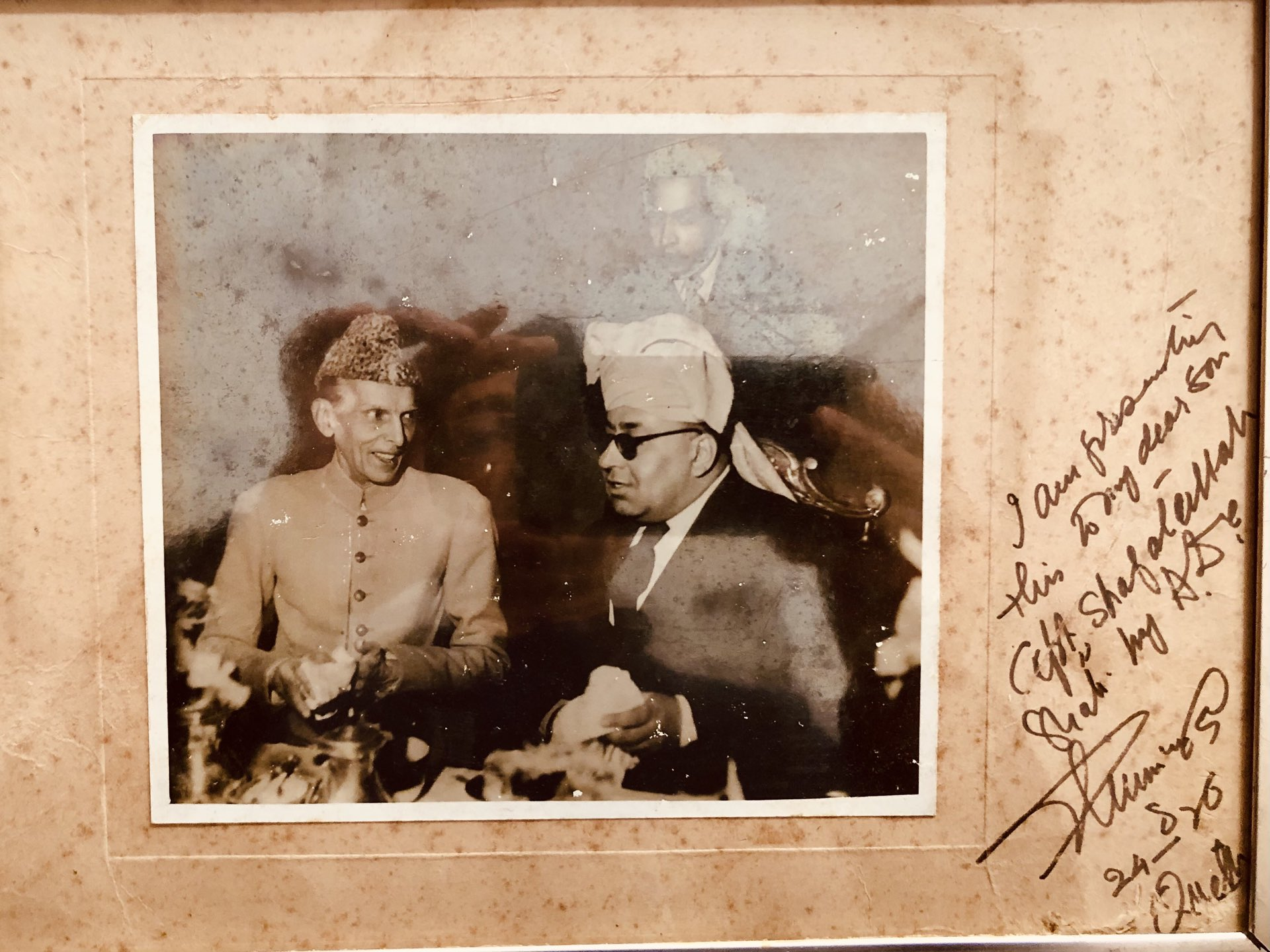
- Muhammad Ali Jinnah (left) with Khan (right)

18th Khan of Kalat
- In office 10 September 1933 – 1979 (as pretender from 14 October 1955)
- Preceded by: Azam Jan Khan
- Succeeded by: Mir Suleman Dawood Jan (as pretender from 1979)

5th Governor of Balochistan
- In office 1 January 1974 – 5 July 1977
- Chief Minister: Mohammad Khan Barozai
- Preceded by: Akbar Khan Bugti
- Succeeded by: Khuda Bakhsh Marri

Personal details
- Born: Ahmad Yar Khan Ahmedzai; 1902 Khanate of Kalat, British India (present-day Balochistan, Pakistan)
- Died: 1979 (aged 77) Kalat, Balochistan, Pakistan

Mir Ahmad Yar Khan Ahmedzai GCIE (1902–1979), commonly referred to as Ahmad Yar Khan, was the last Khan of Kalat, a princely state in a subsidiary alliance with British India and the Dominion of Pakistan, serving from 10 September 1933 to 14 October 1955.

== Life ==
In the 1920s, Ahmad Yar served as an agent of the British intelligence service, reporting on Russian influence and the spread of pro-Marxist sympathy among the poorer Baloch subjects.

He assumed the throne of the Khanate of Kalat in 1933, and was decorated by the British in the 1936 New Year Honours as a Knight Grand Commander of the Most Eminent Order of the Indian Empire (GCIE).

With the withdrawal of the British from the Indian subcontinent in August 1947, the Indian Independence Act provided that the princely states which had existed alongside but outside British India were released from all their subsidiary alliances and other treaty obligations to the British, while at the same time the British withdrew from their obligations to defend the states. The rulers were left to decide whether to accede to one of the newly independent states of India or the Dominion of Pakistan or to remain independent outside both. As stated by Sardar Patel at a press conference in January 1948, "As you are all aware, on the lapse of Paramountcy every Indian State became a separate independent entity."

Muhammad Ali Jinnah was Yar Khan's legal adviser in the early 1940s. Jinnah persuaded Yar Khan to agree to accede to Pakistan, but the Khan stalled for time. After a period of negotiations, Khan finally acceded to Pakistan on 27 March 1948.

Yar Khan's younger brother, Prince Agha Abdul Karim Baloch, revolted against his decision and took refuge in Afghanistan to wage an armed resistance against Pakistan, with little support from the rest of Balochistan. He finally surrendered to Pakistan in 1950.

On 3 October 1952, as one of the princely states of Pakistan, Kalat entered into the Baluchistan States Union with three neighbouring states, Kharan, Las Bela, and Makran, with Yar Khan at the head of the Union with the title of Khan-e-Azam. The Khanate came to an end on 14 October 1955, when the Baluchistan States Union was dissolved, Kalat was incorporated into the One Unit of West Pakistan, and Yar Khan ceased to rule.

Yar Khan briefly declared himself Khan again in defiance of the Pakistani state from June to October 1958. On 6 October 1958, the Pakistani government arrested and imprisoned him on charges of sedition during the 1958 Pakistani coup d'état against President Iskander Mirza, but it later released him and briefly restored his title in 1962. His arrest triggered an insurgent uprising led by Nauroz Khan in 1959.

== Legacy ==
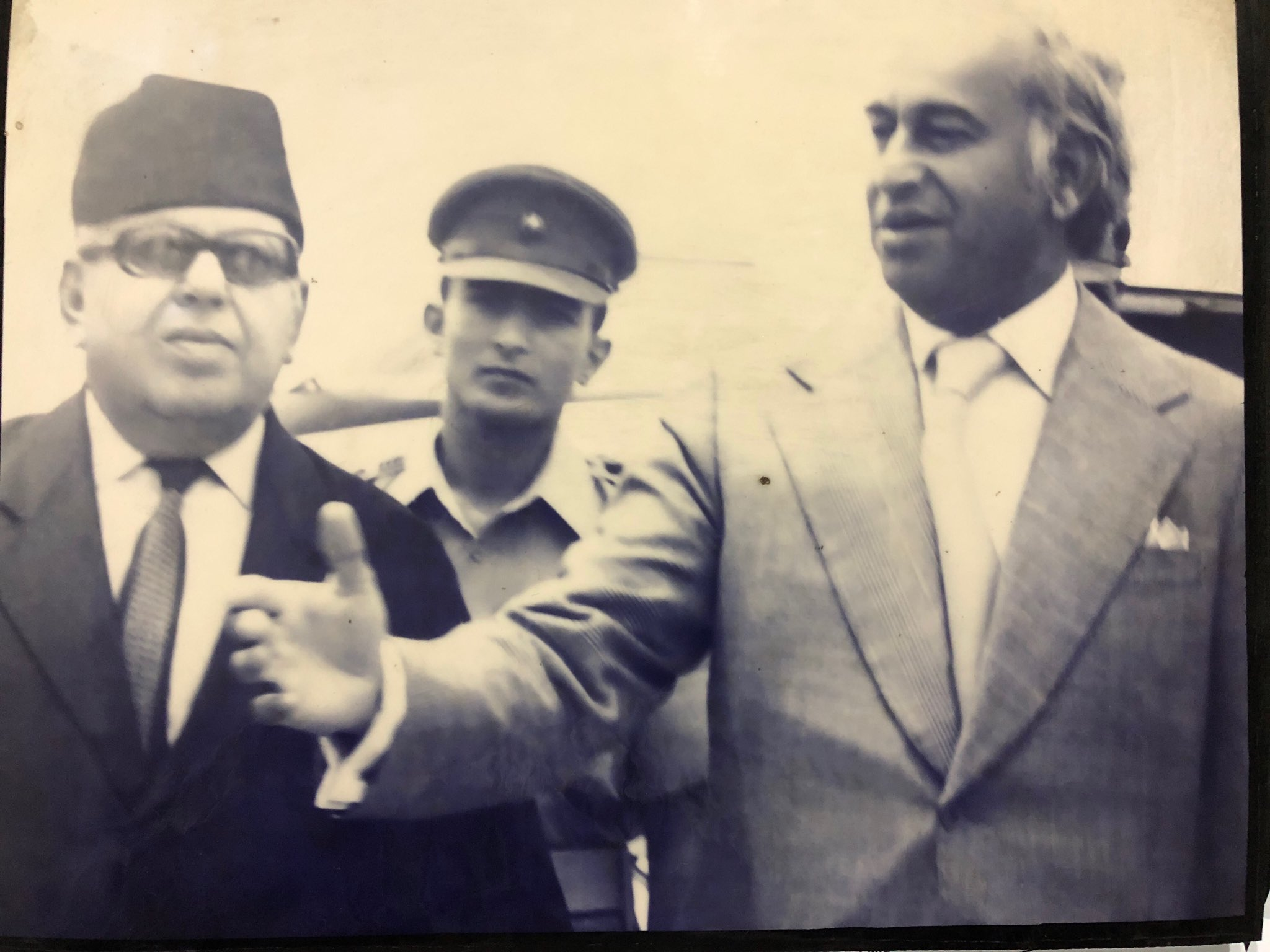
Ahmad (left) pictured next to his ADC, Captain Shafaat Ullah Shah (middle) and Prime Minister of Pakistan Zulfikar Ali Bhutto (right)

Yar Khan's eldest son, Mir Suleman Dawood Jan, assumed the title of Khan of Kalat upon his father's death in 1979. On Dawood Jan's death his son Suleman Daud Jan became the new Khan of Kalat. He has lived in exile in London since the death of Akbar Bugti in 2006. Chief Minister Abdul Malik Baloch and Sanaullah Zehri have asked him to return to Pakistan. Yar Khan's younger sons, Prince Mohyuddin Baloch and grandson Prince Umer Daud Khan, are both politicians in Pakistan.

== Publications ==
- Mir Ahmad Yar Khan Baluch, Inside Baluchistan: A Political Autobiography of Khan-e-Azam Mir Ahmad Yar Khan Baluch, Ex-ruler of Kalat State (Royal Book Company: 1975) ASIN B0000E81K7
