= Baluchistan Agency =

Agency of British India (1877–1947) in modern-day Pakistan

Coordinates: 29°01′33″N 66°35′24″E

Balochistan Agency
- Agencies of British India (1877–1947); Colony of the United Kingdom (1947)
- 1877–1947
- Flag

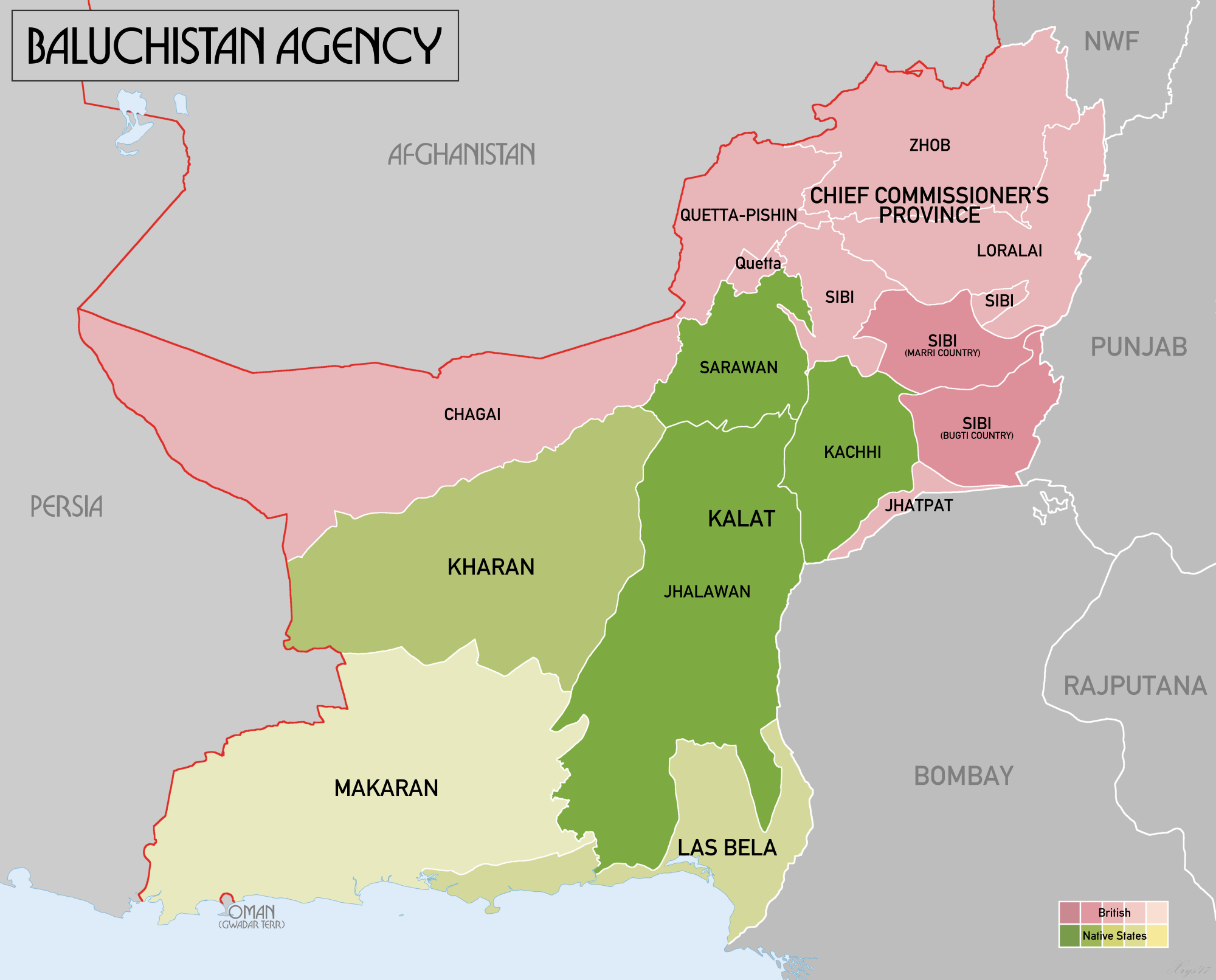
- Administrative map of Baluchistan Agency 1931
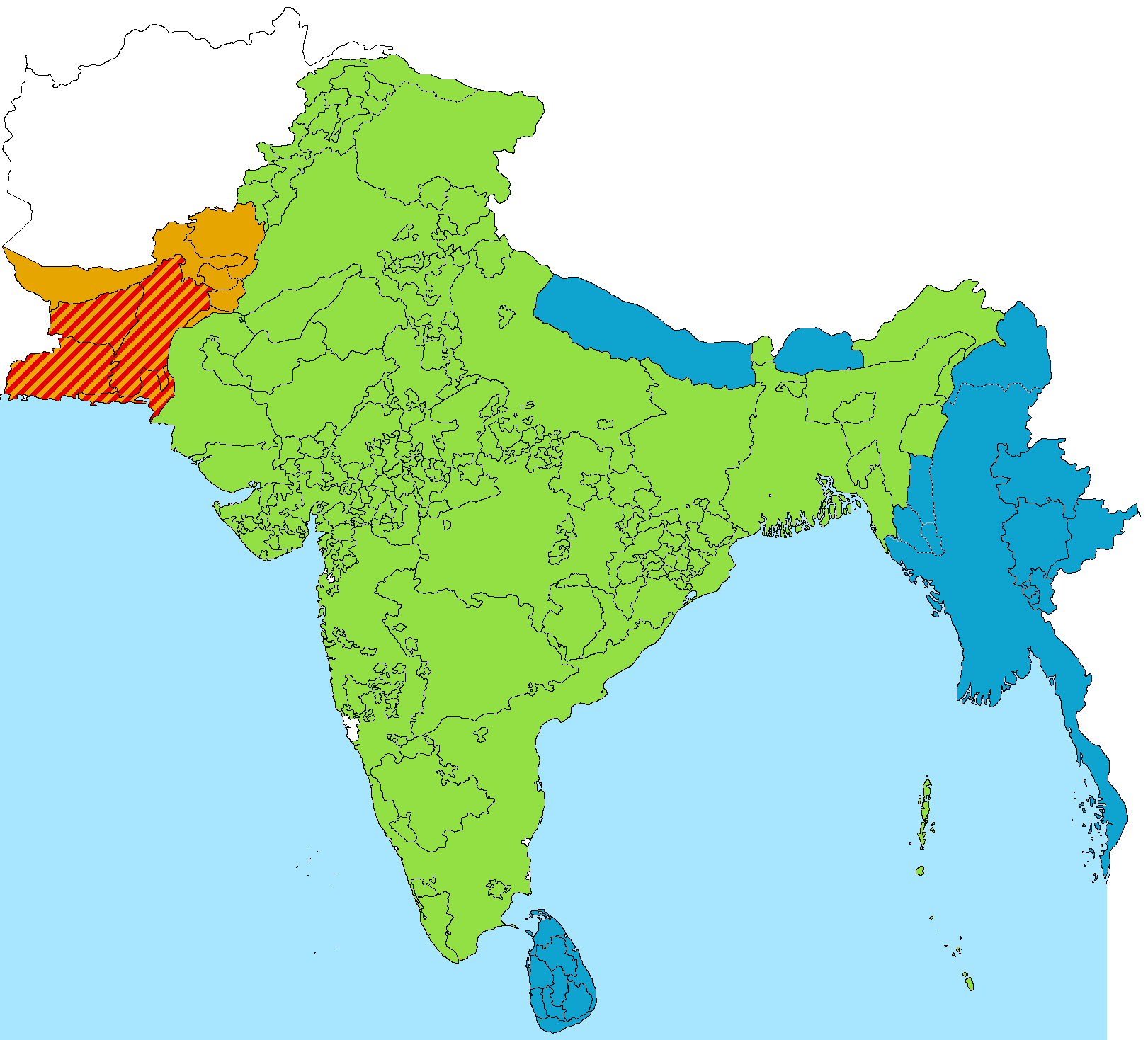
- Baluchistan Agency in British India 1940 (in light orange)
- Capital: Quetta
- Area
  - 1941: 347,064 km^{2} (134,002 sq mi)
- Population
  - 1941: 857,835
- History
  - Signature of the Treaty of Mastung by the Khan of Kalat and the Baloch Sardars: 1877
  - Independence of Pakistan: 1947
Succeeded by
Balochistan, Pakistan
- "A collection of treaties, engagements, and sunnuds relating to India and neighbouring countries"

The Baluchistan Agency (also spelt Balochistan Agency) was one of the agencies of British India during the colonial era. It was located in the present-day Balochistan province of Pakistan.

== Geography ==
The territories of the agency covered an area of 347,064 km^{2} (134,002 sq mi) and included areas which had been acquired by lease or otherwise brought under direct British control, as well as the princely states.

== History ==
This political agency was established in 1877, following the 1876 treaty signed in Mastung by Baloch leaders by means of which they accepted the mediation of the British authorities in their disputes.

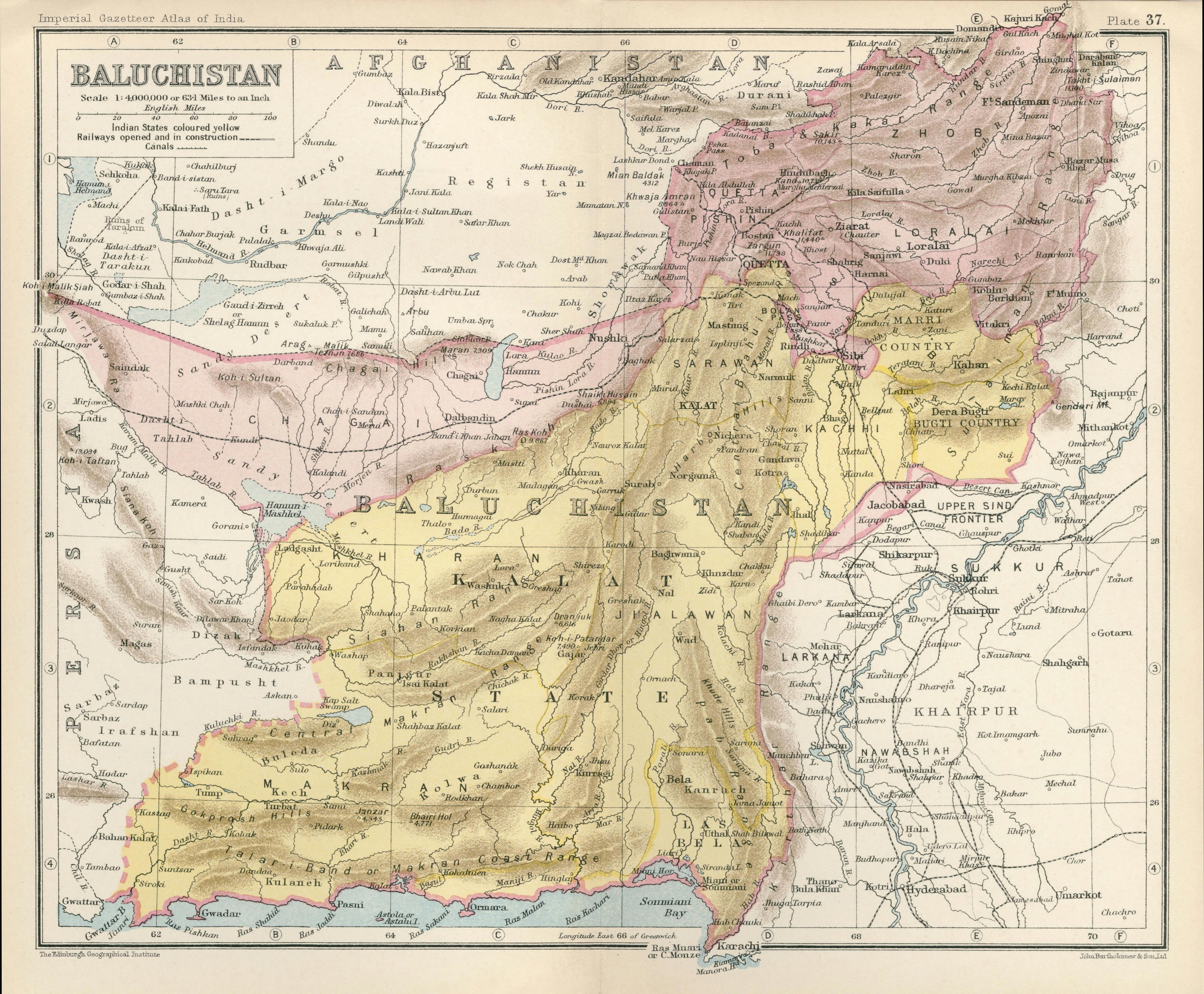
Map of Balochistan in British India, published in the 'Imperial Gazetteer of India' (Vol. XXVI, Atlas; 1931 revised edition; plate no. 37)

Colonel Sir Robert Groves Sandeman introduced an innovative system of tribal pacification in Balochistan that was in effect from 1877 to 1947. However the Government of India generally opposed his Methods and refused to allow it to operate in India's North West Frontier. Historians have long debated its scope and effectiveness in the peaceful spread of Imperial influence.

== Demographics ==
=== Religion ===
Religion in Balochistan Agency (1901−1941)
Religious group	1901		1911		1921		1931		1941	
Religious group	Pop.	%	Pop.	%	Pop.	%	Pop.	%	Pop.	%
Islam	765,368	94.4%	782,648	93.76%	733,477	91.73%	798,093	91.88%	785,181	91.53%
Hinduism	38,158	4.71%	38,326	4.59%	51,348	6.42%	53,681	6.18%	54,394	6.34%
Sikhism	2,972	0.37%	8,390	1.01%	7,741	0.97%	8,425	0.97%	12,044	1.4%
Christianity	4,026	0.5%	5,085	0.61%	6,693	0.84%	8,059	0.93%	6,056	0.71%
Zoroastrianism	166	0.02%	170	0.02%	165	0.02%	167	0.02%	76	0.01%
Judaism	48	0.01%	57	0.01%	19	0%	17	0%	20	0%
Jainism	8	0%	10	0%	17	0%	17	0%	7	0%
Buddhism	0	0%	16	0%	160	0.02%	68	0.01%	43	0.01%
Others	0	0%	1	0%	5	0%	75	0.01%	14	0%
Total Population	810,746	100%	834,703	100%	799,625	100%	868,617	100%	857,835	100%

==== Districts ====
Religion in the Districts of Baluchistan Agency (1941)
District	Islam		Hinduism		Sikhism		Christianity		Others (Note: Including Jainism, Buddhism, Zoroastrianism, Judaism, Tribals, others, or not stated)		Total	
District	Pop.	%	Pop.	%	Pop.	%	Pop.	%	Pop.	%	Pop.	%
Sibi District	157,706	95.64%	6,425	3.9%	566	0.34%	200	0.12%	2	0%	164,899	100%
Administered Areas	99,875	93.53%	6,144	5.75%	566	0.53%	200	0.19%	2	0%	106,787	100%
Marri-Bugti Country	57,831	99.52%	281	0.48%	0	0%	0	0%	0	0%	58,112	100%
Quetta–Pishin District	113,288	72.49%	28,629	18.32%	8,787	5.62%	5,441	3.48%	144	0.09%	156,289	100%
Loralai District	79,273	94.73%	3,129	3.74%	1,124	1.34%	159	0.19%	0	0%	83,685	100%
Zhob District	55,987	91.04%	4,286	6.97%	1,076	1.75%	146	0.24%	4	0.01%	61,499	100%
Chaghai District	27,864	93.04%	1,204	4.02%	181	0.6%	1	0%	0	0%	29,950	100%
Bolan District	4,812	80.08%	950	15.81%	184	3.06%	55	0.92%	8	0.13%	6,009	100%
Total	438,980	87.51%	44,623	8.9%	11,918	2.38%	6,002	1.2%	158	0.03%	501,631	100%

==== Princely States ====
Religion in the Princely States of Baluchistan Agency (1941)
Princely state	Islam		Hinduism		Sikhism		Christianity		Others		Total	
Princely state	Pop.	%	Pop.	%	Pop.	%	Pop.	%	Pop.	%	Pop.	%
Kalat State	245,208	96.8%	7,971	3.15%	79	0.03%	45	0.02%	2	0%	253,305	100%
Makran Division	86,406	99.72%	206	0.24%	17	0.02%	20	0.02%	2	0%	86,651	100%
Kachhi Division	79,016	91.76%	7,095	8.24%	1	0%	0	0%	0	0%	86,112	100%
Jhalawan Division	52,194	99.85%	78	0.15%	0	0%	0	0%	0	0%	52,272	100%
Sarawan Division	27,592	97.6%	592	2.09%	61	0.22%	25	0.09%	0	0%	28,270	100%
Las Bela State	67,310	97.46%	1,701	2.46%	47	0.07%	9	0.01%	0	0%	69,067	100%
Kharan State	33,733	99.71%	99	0.29%	0	0%	0	0%	0	0%	33,832	100%
Total	346,251	97.21%	9,771	2.74%	126	0.04%	54	0.02%	2	0%	356,204	100%

==== Cities ====
Religion in the Cities of Baluchistan Agency (1941)
City/Urban Area	Islam		Hinduism		Sikhism		Christianity		Others		Total	
City/Urban Area	Pop.	%	Pop.	%	Pop.	%	Pop.	%	Pop.	%	Pop.	%
Quetta (Note: Includes town and cantonment)	27,935	43.33%	24,010	37.24%	7,364	11.42%	5,024	7.79%	143	0.22%	64,476	100%
Fort Sandeman	5,232	55.94%	2,992	31.99%	1,004	10.73%	121	1.29%	4	0.04%	9,353	100%
Sibi	5,505	62.18%	2,814	31.78%	362	4.09%	171	1.93%	2	0.02%	8,854	100%
Chaman	2,812	42.29%	2,898	43.58%	697	10.48%	242	3.64%	1	0.02%	6,650	100%
Loralai	2,327	45.67%	1,536	30.15%	1,116	21.9%	116	2.28%	0	0%	5,095	100%
Bela	3,389	86.79%	469	12.01%	47	1.2%	0	0%	0	0%	3,905	100%
Pasni	3,547	98.09%	69	1.91%	0	0%	0	0%	0	0%	3,616	100%
Mastung	2,963	94.36%	124	3.95%	28	0.89%	25	0.8%	0	0%	3,140	100%
Kalat	2,049	83.19%	381	15.47%	33	1.34%	0	0%	0	0%	2,463	100%
Machh	1,632	73.51%	421	18.96%	121	5.45%	38	1.71%	8	0.36%	2,220	100%
Usta	1,154	59.95%	688	35.74%	77	4%	6	0.31%	0	0%	1,925	100%
Pishin	1,245	65.87%	447	23.65%	183	9.68%	15	0.79%	0	0%	1,890	100%
Panjgur	416	87.95%	45	9.51%	9	1.9%	3	0.63%	0	0%	473	100%
Total Urban population	60,206	52.78%	36,894	32.35%	11,041	9.68%	5,751	5.04%	158	0.14%	114,060	100%

=== Castes and tribes ===
Castes and Tribes of Baluchistan Agency (1931–1941)
Caste or Tribe	1931		1941	
Caste or Tribe	Pop.	%	Pop.	%
Baluch	227,846	26.23%	237,526	27.69%
Pathan	193,025	22.22%	190,074	22.16%
Brahui	152,588	17.57%	128,336	14.96%
Jatt	77,157	8.88%	67,317	7.85%
Other Muslims	60,690	6.99%	68,032	7.93%
Lasi	31,812	3.66%	34,066	3.97%
Sayyid	21,976	2.53%	23,327	2.72%
Other Hindus	16,905	1.95%	12,765	1.49%
Other Sikhs	48	0.01%	51	0.01%
Others	86,570	9.97%	96,341	11.23%
Total	868,617	100%	857,835	100%

== Princely states ==
The Baluchistan Agency consisted of three princely states:

- Kalat khanate, the premier state and only salute state (Hereditary salute of 19-guns; titles Wali, Khan; from 1739 Wali, Begler Begi, Khan), including its Jhalawan, Kacchi and Sarawan administrative divisions
  - while Makran (title Nazem, later Nawwab) is quoted as either another division, a vassal state or autonomous
- and Kalat's two feudatory states :
  - Las Bela (title Jam Saheb)
  - Kharan (title Mir; from 1921, Sardar Bahador Nawwab).

The Government of India maintained its relations with the states through its political agent in Kalat. The first agent in Balochistan was Robert Groves Sandeman (1835–1892), Knight Commander of the Order of the Star of India, who was appointed by Lord Lytton, the Viceroy of India.

== Administrative structure ==
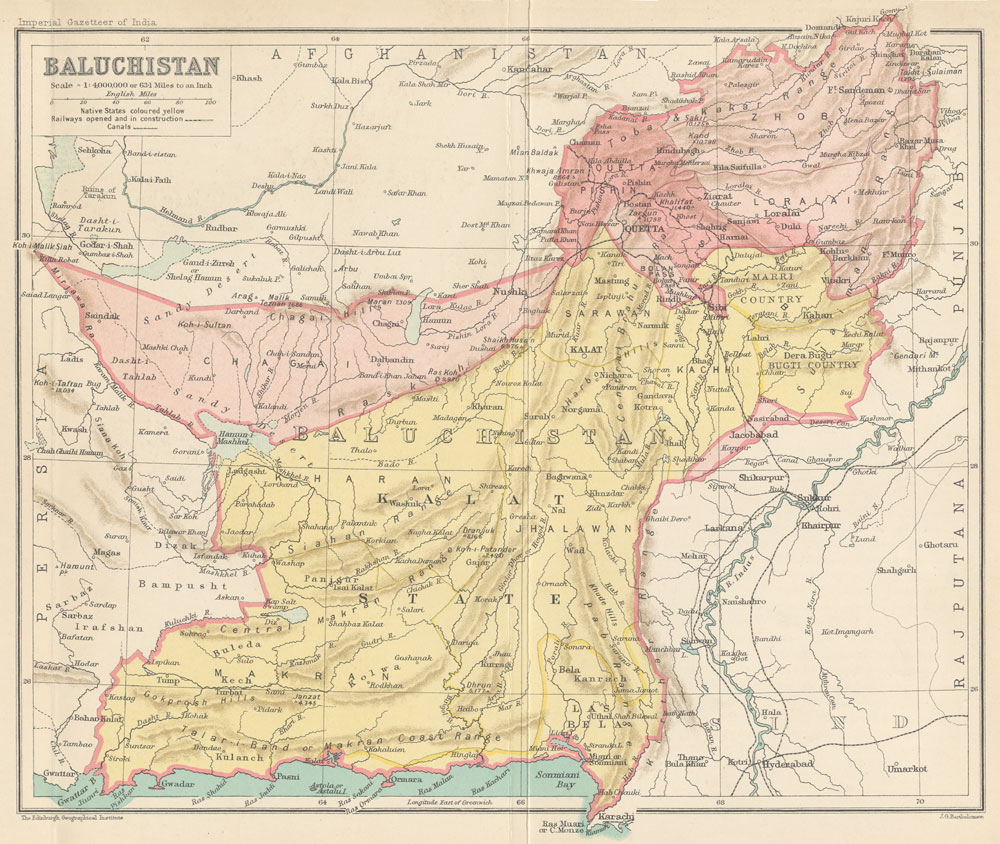
Map of the Balochistan Agency with the princely states' territories in yellow.

In addition to the princely states, the north of the agency was administered as the Chief Commissioner's Province. This consisted of the following districts:

- Chagai
- Quetta-Pishin (including Quetta)
- Jhatpat
- Loralai
- Sibi (including Bugti and Marri tribal areas)
- Zhob

== See also ==
- History of Balochistan
- List of Indian Princely States
- Treaty of Kalat
