= Khudadad Khan (ruler) =

Khan of Kalat

Khudadad Khan Ahmadzai, GCSI

Khan of Kalat
- Reign: 1857-1893
- Predecessor: Maḥmud Khan I
- Successor: Maḥmud Khan II
- Born: c. 1841; Kalat, Khanate of Kalat, British Raj (present-day Kalat, Balochistan, Pakistan)
- Died: Date unknown Kalat, Khanate of Kalat (present-day Kalat, Balochistan, Pakistan)
- Issue: Mahmud Khan; Aẓam Jān
Names
- Mir Khudadad Khan Ahmadzai
- House: Ahmadzai
- Dynasty: Khanate of Kalat
- Father: Nasir Khan II
- Mother: Khadijah
- Religion: Sunni Islam

Mir Khudadad Khan (Balochi, brahui: خُداداد خان) was the Khan of Kalat from 1857 to 1893 and again from 1857 to 1893. He was the tenth khan of the Baloch.

== Biography ==
He was born in 1841 to Mehrab Khan and his wife Khadijah.

He ascended to the throne at the age of sixteen following the death of his stepbrother, Mir Nasir Khan II.

== History ==
During the 1870s, British strategic interest in Balochistan increased as Russia advanced into Central Asia. In response, Captain Robert Sandeman was sent to Kalat, where he formulated the system of indirect rule through tribal chiefs under British supervision later known as the Sandeman System. Under new agreements, the Khan’s foreign relations were restricted, a permanent British garrison was established in Kalat, and the British administration became the arbiter in disputes between the Khan and the sardars. In return, Khudadad Khan’s annual subsidy from the British government was raised.

In 1860, the Khan of Kalat, Mir Khudadad Khan, attempted to control over parts of western Balochistan, but the British authorities prevented him from proceeding by force. Later, on 20 February 1863, when the British planned a telegraph line from Jask to Karachi, they concluded an agreement directly with Khudadad Khan and the Baloch sardars of western Balochistan.

He was forced to abdicate in 1893, and was succeeded by his son Mir Mahmud Khan II, who ruled until 1931
