= Mehrab Khan II of Kalat =

Mir Mehrab Khan Ahmadzai II
- Khan of Kalat
- Reign: c. 1817– 13 November 1839
- Coronation: c. 1817
- Predecessor: Mir Mahmud Khan I
- Successor: Mir Shah Nawaz Khan
- Born: Kalat
- Died: 13 November 1839; Kalat
- Religion: Sunni Islam

Mir Mehrab Khan Ahmadzai II was the khan (ruler) from about 1817 to 1839 of the State of Kalat, which is now part of the Balochistan province of Pakistan

Mehrab Khan was a weak ruler who was deposed and killed by the British, who had been led to believe that he was disloyal to them and was dealing with them in bad faith. He was replaced by a ruler chosen by the British.

== Background ==
The Khanate of Kalat reached its peak in the 1750s during the reign of Mir Noori Naseer Khan, who had unified the Kalat region. During this period, Kalat was under the suzerainty of the Durrani Empire. In 1818, it achieved a kind of independence, but it continued to be subject to some orders from the rulers of the Emirate of Afghanistan until at least 1838.

== Reign of Mehrab Khan ==
A grandson of Nasir Khan, Mehrab Khan came to the throne of Kalat in about 1816 or 1817.

The reign of Mehrab was a continual struggle with his chiefs, many of whom he killed. Not enjoying their strong support, Mehrab decided he needed to be on good terms with the sardars of Kandahar, to avoid the plundering of his country. According to Arthur Conolly, he also found it necessary to appease Ranjit Singh, Maharaja of the Sikh Empire, while he seemed to hope for the restoration of the Sadozai dynasty in Afghanistan.

A weak ruler, Mehrab alienated his chiefs by surrendering to the influence of a man named Daud Muhammad, a man of low extraction, sacrificing his hereditary minister, Fateh Muhammad, to give power to Daud. However, Naib Mulla Muhammad Hasan, a son of Fateh Muhammad, killed Daud and was restored to the hereditary office. Hasan never forgave what had been done to his father, and the later misfortunes which overtook Mehrab Khan are seen as his revenge.

In 1833–1834, Shah Shujah Durrani failed in his first attempt to recover his former Durrani Empire dominions, and for a short time he took refuge at Kalat, before returning to exile at Ludhiana. In 1838, the British decided to mount an expedition for the restoration of Shah Shujah, and a British officer, Lieutenant Leech, was sent to Kalat to obtain the co-operation of Mehrab Khan, through whose territories the armies had to march. But Mulla Muhammad Hasan created a dislike between the khan and Leech, who left Kalat without any progress in his mission. Hasan also led the British to believe that the khan had seized stores of grain which had been collected for their troops. He wrote orders in the khan's name, without his knowledge, inciting the tribes to rise and harass the British army on its line of march.

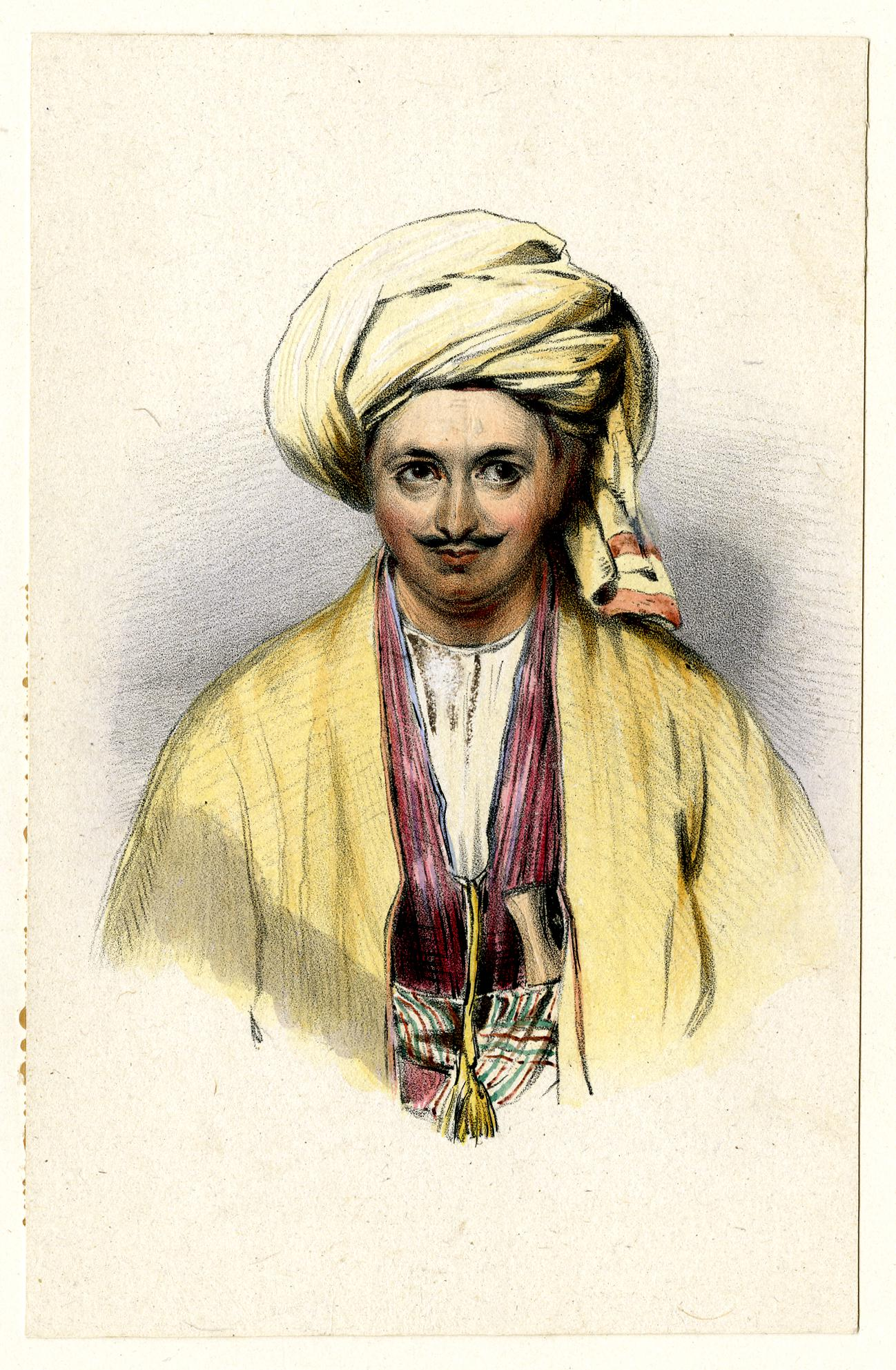
Sir Alexander Burnes

Captain Sir Alexander Burnes (1805-1841) was sent to Kalat to deal with the supposed hostility of the khan and to negotiate a treaty with him. Treaty No. CLXXIII was signed, contrary to the secret wishes of Hasan, and the khan agreed to travel to Quetta to pay his respects to Shah Shujah. Burnes went before him, and while he was on his way, Hasan caused Burnes to be robbed of the treaty which the Khan had signed, leading the British to believe this had been done on the orders of the khan, whom Hasan persuaded not to travel to Quetta, where he said the British planned to arrest him. The British now had, as they thought, proof of the khan's hostility to them and decided to punish him while they had the chance.

In 1839, Sir Thomas Willshire's brigade was returning from Kabul, and a detachment was sent to Kalat to punish the khan. The town was captured on 13 November. Mehrab Khan was killed, and his son Hasain Khan fled. From the papers the British found in the fort, the treachery of Mulla Muhammad Hasan was discovered and he was arrested.

With the British was one Shah Nawaz Khan, a youth of fourteen, descended in the direct male line from Mahabat Khan, who had been deposed by Ahmad Shah Durrani in 1749. He and his brother, Fateh Khan, had been imprisoned by Mehrab Khan, but had escaped. The British then set up Shah Nawaz as Khan of Kalat; but the provinces of Shal, Mastung, and Kach Gandava were annexed to the dominions of the ruler in Kabul. Lieutenant Loveday was left with the boy to support him as political officer, but Shah Nawaz was deposed the following year by a rebellion of tribesmen.
