= Mir Suleman Dawood Jan =

Brahui Politician

- Education: Aitchison College
- Family: Ahmedzai family

Mir Suleman Dawood Jan Ahmedzai (Brahui and Balochi: آغا میر سلیمان داوود خان احمدزی) is the 35th and the current titular Khan of Kalat, a position he has held since the death of his father, Mir Dawood Jan, in 1998. Currently, he lives in self-imposed exile in Wales.

Mir Suleman Dawood received his initial education in Lahore and Quetta. He got his early education at Aitchison College in Lahore (1972–1983). His mother tongue is Brahvi while he also speaks Balochi, Urdu and English fluently.

Mir Suleman Dawood has lived in exile in Cardiff, Wales, occasionally traveling to London. His only son, Mir Mohammad Khan Ahmadzai, is estranged from him. Both Mir Suleman Dawood and his son had applied for asylum, but his son later rebelled and withdrew his asylum request. After that Mir Mohammad Khan Ahmadzai left his father and returned to Pakistan. Upon his arrival to Pakistan, he hoisted the Pakistani flag at the Quaid-e-Azam Residency in Ziarat. Currently, Mir Mohammad Khan Ahmadzai regularly hosts senior figures of law enforcement in Balochistan at the same place where his father used to hold court.

Officially, the Government of Pakistan does not recognize his authority, but he still has influence within much of the populace, and the leading politicians like Chief Minister Abdul Malik Baloch and Sanaullah Zehri have asked him to return to Pakistan to pacify the Baloch insurgents. Mir Suleman Dawood Jan's Uncle Prince Mohyuddin Baloch who is also his father-in-law and his younger brothers Prince Faisal Dawood and Prince Ahmed Umer Dawood, are politicians in Pakistan.
