= List of wars involving Pakistan =

Since its establishment in 1947, Pakistan has been involved in numerous armed conflicts both locally and around the world. The main focus of its military operations have both historically and currently been on neighbouring India—against whom Pakistan has fought four major wars in addition to commonly-recurring border skirmishes and standoffs. The two nations have had a hostile and turbulent relationship since their independence from the United Kingdom and subsequent war over the Himalayan region of Jammu and Kashmir. Both India and Pakistan claim Kashmir in its entirety but have not exercised control over the entire region, which remains divided and contested between the two states by the Line of Control. The Kashmir conflict has seen extensive—albeit unsuccessful—intervention and mediation by the United Nations.

Pakistan has also had a turbulent relationship with neighbouring Afghanistan, characterized by armed border skirmishes and periods of diplomatic tension. The Pakistani government has increased military activity along the Afghanistan–Pakistan border and built a border barrier to crack down on illegal immigration, militancy, and smuggling.

Outside of its home region of South Asia, Pakistan has also engaged in international conflicts in the Middle East and Africa as part of larger coalitions, and remains one of the largest contributors of troops to various United Nations peacekeeping missions. The country was designated as a major non-NATO ally by the United States in 2004, and has participated extensively in the American-led war on terror following the 9/11 attacks.

== List ==
Pakistani victory
Pakistani defeat
Another result (e.g. a treaty or peace without a clear result, status quo ante bellum, result unknown or indecisive)
Ongoing conflict

| Conflict | Pakistan and allies | Opponents | Results |
|---|---|---|---|
| First Indo-Pakistani War (1947–1948) | Pakistan; Azad Kashmir; Furqan Force; Swat State; Hunza State; Nagar State; Chitral State | India; Jammu and Kashmir | Ceasefire: Partitioning of Kashmir between India and Pakistan |
| First Kalat Rebellion (1948) | Pakistan | Kalat insurgents | Victory: Defeat of the insurgents |
| Waziristan rebellion (1948–1954) | Pakistan | Waziristan; Supported by: Afghanistan; India | Pakistani victory: Failure to foment an extensive uprising; End of Insurrection; Datta Khel area of Waziristan recaptured by Pakistan |
| Second Kalat Rebellion (1958–1959) | Pakistan | Kalat insurgents | Victory: Surrender of Nauroz Khan |
| Dir campaign (1959–1960) | Pakistan; Dir opposition; Supported by: Swat state | Dir state; Jandol State; Supported by: Afghanistan (until 1960) | Pakistani/Opposition victory: Overthrow of Nawab Jahan Khan |
| Bajaur Campaign (1960–1961) | Pakistan | Afghanistan | Pakistani victory: Deterioration of Afghanistan–Pakistan relations |
| 1960s insurgency in Balochistan (1963–1969) | Pakistan; Supported by: (Pahlavi Iran) Iran | Parrari; PFAR; Baloch Liberation Front; Bugti militia Supported by: Kingdom of Afghanistan; First Republic of Iraq (until 1968); Ba'athist Iraq (from 1968); Syria | Ceasefire: Abolition of the "One Unit" policy |
| Second Indo-Pakistani War (1965) | Pakistan | India | Inconclusive: United Nations mandated ceasefire; Both sides claim victory; No permanent territorial changes (see Tashkent Declaration) |
| 1971 JVP insurrection (1971) | (Dominion of Ceylon) Ceylon: (Dominion of Ceylon) United Front (since May 15); SLFP; CCP (Pro-Soviet); LSSP; Australia; Egypt; India; Pakistan; Singapore; Soviet Union; United Kingdom; United States (Socialist Federal Republic of Yugoslavia) Yugoslavia; China | JVP Supported by: North Korea (alleged) (Ba'athist Iraq) ASBPI; CCP (Maoist) (alleged) | Victory: Rebel forces surrender; Ceylonese government reestablishes control over entire island |
| Bangladesh Liberation War (From March 1971); Third Indo-Pakistani War (From Dec 1971) | Pakistan | Provisional Government of Bangladesh; India | Defeat: Independence of Bangladesh; Simla Agreement |
| 1976 Dir rebellion (3–10 September 1976) | Pakistan (Khyber Pakhtunkhwa) Dir Levies | Dir rebels | Pakistani victory: Suppression of rebellion |
| Fourth Balochistan Conflict (1973–1978) | Pakistan; Iran | Baloch separatists (Afghanistan) Pashtun Zalmay | Victory: Return to status quo ante bellum |
| Soviet–Afghan War (1979–1989) | Afghan mujahideen Pakistan | Soviet Union; Afghanistan | Victory: Afghan mujahideen victory and repulsion of the Soviet invasion; Continuation of Pakistani involvement in the ensuing Afghan conflict |
| Siachen conflict (1984–2003) | Pakistan | India | Defeat: Annexation of the Siachen Glacier into India following Operation Meghdoot; India captures Quaid Post / Bana Top during Operation Rajiv; Ceasefire since 2003 |
| Malakand insurrection (1994–1995) | Pakistan; Pakistan Army; (Khyber Pakhtunkhwa) FCKP(N) | TNSM; Black turbans Foreign jihadists | Victory: Suppression of rebellion |
| Kargil War (1999) | Pakistan | India | Defeat: India regains possession of Kargil; Return to status quo ante bellum |
| War in North-West Pakistan (2004–2017) Drone war (2004–2018) | Pakistan; United States: USAF; CIA; Supported by: United Kingdom | Taliban Tehrik-i-Taliban Pakistan: Jamaat-ul-Ahrar (Note: Until 2020, when it re-merged into the TTP.); Tehreek-e-Nafaz-e-Shariat-e-Mohammadi (Note: Collaboration with the TTP in 2007.); Lashkar-e-Islam (Note: Collaboration with the TTP in 2015.); Al-Qaeda; Lashkar-e-Jhangvi; Haqqani network; Jundallah (until 2014); Islamic Movement of Uzbekistan (until 2015); Turkistan Islamic Party (until 2015); ISIL-aligned groups Islamic State: Khorasan Province; Jundallah; Islamic Movement of Uzbekistan; Jamaat-ul-Ahrar (until 2015) | Victory: Most areas under Pakistani control with the Success under Operation Zarb-e-Azab; Main force of Pakistani Taliban take refuge in Afghanistan; United States-Allied Victory: 430 drone strikes confirmed; 81 high-level insurgent leaders and thousands of low-level insurgents killed; Large number of insurgents killed while some fled to Afghanistan; Most recent drone strike launched in January 2018 |
| Insurgency in Sindh (2003–present) | Pakistan: Sindh; Supported by: Pakistan Army | Sindhudesh movement; Sindhi separatists; Supported by: Baloch separatists | Ongoing (extremely low-level) |
| Insurgency in Balochistan (2004–present) | Pakistan Forces involved: Pakistan Armed Forces; Pakistan Army (until 2008, again from 2024); Pakistan Air Force; Pakistan Navy; Special Forces: Special Service Group; Special Service Group (Navy); Special Services Wing; Civil Armed Forces; Frontier Corps; Frontier Corps Balochistan (North); Frontier Corps Balochistan (South); Pakistan Coast Guards; Pakistan Levies; Pakistan Police; Balochistan Police; Counter Terrorism Department; Balochistan Levies; Pakistani Intelligence community; NACTA; ISI; Military Intelligence; FIA; Iran Forces involved: Iranian Armed Forces; Artesh (since 1979); IRGC (since 1980); Ground Forces; Aerospace Force; Navy; Basij; Iranian police; Border Guard (since 2000); Special forces: Saberin Takavar Brigade; 110th Salman Farsi Special Operations Brigade; Sepah Navy Special Force; 3rd Marine Brigade; Ministry of Intelligence; Imperial Iranian Army (until 1979) | Baloch separatist groups: Baloch Raaji Aajoi Sangar; BLA; BLF; Baloch Republican Guards; Sindhudesh Revolutionary Army; Former belligerents: LeB (inactive); BLUF (2009–2010); BSO (Azad) (inactive); BNA (2022–2023); BRA (2006–2022); UBA (2013–2022); Sectarian groups: Tehrik-i-Taliban Pakistan (since 2007); People's Fighters Front (2025–present); Jaish ul-Adl (from 2025); Nasr Movement (2010–present); Pada Baloch Movement (2017–present); Mohammad Rasul Allah Group (1970s–present); Ansar Al-Furqan (since 2013); Former belligerents: Jaish ul-Adl (2012–2025); Harakat Ansar Iran (2012–13); Hizbul-Furqan (2012–13); Jundallah (2003–12); Lashkar-e-Jhangvi (1996–2024); Sipah-e-Sahaba (1985–2018); Islamic State (since 2015); IS-KP (since 2014); IS-PP (since 2019) | Ongoing: Extension of the conflict into Iran |
| War against the Islamic State (2013–present) | In multiple regions: CJTF–OIR; IMCTC; In Iraq: Iraq; Iraqi Kurdistan; United States; Iran; Albania; In Syria: Ba'athist Syria (2013–2024); Iran (2013–2024); Russia (2015–2024); Syria (2024–present); Turkey; United States; Jordan; Syrian Salvation Government (2017–2024); Syrian Interim Government (2013–2025); Autonomous Administration of North and East Syria (2015–2026); United States; In Egypt: Egypt (conflict since 2014); Israel; Hamas; In Libya: Libya Tripoli-based government (2015–present) Tobruk-based government (2014–present); Egypt; France; United States; In Afghanistan: Islamic Republic of Afghanistan (2015–2021); Islamic Emirate of Afghanistan (since 2021) (the Taliban, in a conflict with IS since 2015); In Pakistan: Pakistan; In West Africa: Multinational Joint Task Force | Islamic State: Wilayat Libya (in Libya); Wilayat Sinai (in the Sinai peninsula); Wilayat West Africa (in West Africa); Wilayat Sahil (in the Sahel); Wilayat Central Africa (in Central Africa); Wilayat Mozambique (in Mozambique); Wilayat Khorasan (in Afghanistan and Iran); Wilayat Qavqaz (in the North Caucasus); Abu Sayyaf (in Southeast Asia); Wilayat Somalia (in Somalia); Wilayat Pakistan (in Pakistan) | Ongoing: Coalition victory (territorial); Ongoing low-intensity insurgency|; Airstrikes on IS positions in Iraq, Syria, Libya, Nigeria and Afghanistan; Multinational humanitarian efforts; Arming and supporting local ground forces; Millions of civilians in Iraq and Syria flee their homes, sparking a refugee crisis; Terrorist attacks in Paris (Jan 2015 and Nov 2015), Brussels (Mar 2016) and many other places; Thousands of civilians executed by IS forces in Iraq and Syria; IS controlled around 40% of Iraq at its peak in mid-2014; IS controlled around 50% of Syria by late May 2015; Emergence of independently-governed Kurdish regions; IS military defeated and lost all of its territory in Libya in December 2017; Boko Haram loses territory, but its insurgency continues; IS controlled 5.67% of Syria's land by November 2017 and around 3% of Iraq by October 2017; IS loses all territory in Iraq and most territory in Syria in December 2017; IS loses all remaining territory in Syria in March 2019 |
| 2024 Iran–Pakistan conflict (16–18 January 2024) | Pakistan; Pakistan Armed Forces; Pakistan Army; XII Corps; Artillery Regiment Corps; Air Defence Command; Pakistan Air Force; Southern Air Command; 39th Tactical Air Wing; 2nd Squadron ‘Minhasians’; Claimed by Iran: Jaysh al-Adl | Iran; Iranian Armed Forces; Iranian Army; Air Defense Force; IRGC; Aerospace Force; Missile forces; Air Defence Forces; Claimed by Pakistan: Balochistan Liberation Army; BLF | De-escalation |
| 2025 India–Pakistan conflict | Pakistan | India | Ceasefire |
| 2025 Afghanistan–Pakistan conflict | Pakistan; Pakistan Armed Forces; Pakistan Army; Pakistan Air Force; Civil Armed Forces; Frontier Corps | Afghanistan; Afghan Armed Forces; Islamic National Army; 201 Khalid Ibn Walid Corps; Pakistani Taliban; Hafiz Gul Bahadur Group | Ceasefire |
| 2026 Afghanistan–Pakistan war | Pakistan | Afghanistan; Pakistani Taliban | Ongoing: Pakistan launches Operation Ghazab Lil Haq |

== See also ==
- Outline of Pakistan military history
- Pakistan Armed Forces deployments
  - UN peacekeeping missions involving Pakistan
- Other military conflicts involving Pakistan:
  - Kashmir conflict
  - 2001–2002 India–Pakistan standoff
  - 2008 Indo-Pakistani standoff
  - India–Pakistan border skirmishes (disambiguation)
  - Afghanistan–Pakistan skirmishes
  - 2017 Afghanistan–Pakistan border skirmish
  - 2008–12 Pakistan–United States skirmishes
  - Afghanistan–Pakistan clashes (2024–present)
  - 2025 Afghanistan–Pakistan conflict

== Sources ==
- Jamal, Arif (2009). Shadow War: The Untold Story of Jihad in Kashmir. Melville House. ISBN 978-1-933633-59-6.
- Rashid, Ahmed (2010). Taliban The Power of Militant Islam in Afghanistan and Beyond (Ebook). Yale University Press. ISBN 9780300268997.
- Iqbal, Mehrunisa (1972). "THE INSURGENCY IN CEYLON AND ITS REPERCUSSIONS". Pakistan Horizon. 25 (2): 51–66. ISSN 0030-980X – via JSTOR.
- Fathers, Micheal (12 October 2000). "Obituary: Sirimavo Bandaranaike, the world's first woman prime minister". Time Asia. Hong Kong. ISSN 0040-781X. Archived from the original on 17 July 2012.
- Imran, Muhammad; Senaratne, Bhagya, eds. (2017). PAKISTAN - SRI LANKA RELATIONS: A STORY OF FRIENDSHIP. AR Printers, Islamabad(Pakistan): Institute for Strategic Studies, Research and Analysis (ISSRA), National Defence University, Sector E-9, Islamabad, Pakistan. ISBN 978-969-7671-02-1.
