= Marri (name) =

Marri may refer to the following people:

Given name

- Marri Nallos, pop singer from the Philippines

Surname

- Al-Marri, Qatari surname
- Alauddin Marri (born 1979), Pakistani businessman and social worker
- Atta Muhammad Marri (1937–1998), Sindhi politician
- Balach Marri, leader of the Balochistan Liberation Army in Pakistan
- Changez Khan Marri, Pakistani politician, Nawab of the Marri Baloch people in Pakistan
- Ghazan Marri, politician from Balochistan, Pakistan
- Giuseppe Marri (1788–1852), Italian engraver
- Hyrbyair Marri (born 1968), nationalist from Balochistan, Pakistan
- Jumma Khan Marri, Baloch political leader
- Khair Bakhsh Marri, Baloch Pakistani politician
- Khuda Bakhsh Marri, Governor of Balochistan, Pakistan
- Margret Marri, football player from Burma
- Marri Chenna Reddy (1919–1996), Indian politician
- Mehran Marri, Baloch politician
- Lt Mir Jahangir Khan Marri Shaheed
- Mir Balach Marri (1966–2007), leader of the Balochistan Liberation Army
- Mir Humayun Khan Marri, Deputy Chairman of the Senate of Pakistan
- Mohabat Khan Marri, Pakistani politician
- Mir Alam Zaib Mahandani Marri, Chief of Mahandani sub-tribe of Marri
- Nawab Changez Khan Marri, chief of the Marri Baloch tribe in Pakistan
- Nawaz Marri, Baloch judge
- Quratulain Marri, Pakistani politician
- Shazia Marri, Pakistani politician
- Sher Mohammad Marri, chief of the Marri Baloch tribe in Pakistan
