= Bugti militia =

Baloch militant group

Bugti Militia
- Founder: Akbar Bugti
- Leader: Brahumdagh Bugti
- Founded: 1952
- Dates active: 1952-2005
- Dissolved: 2005
- Headquarters: Dera Bugti
- Active regions: Balochistan, Pakistan, Sistan and Baluchestan province
- Status: Defunct
- Wars: Insurgency in Balochistan; Third Baloch Conflict; Forth Baloch Conflict; Fifth Baloch Conflict; Sistan and Balochistan insurgency

Bugti Militia was a militant group formed in Dera Bugti, Balochistan by Nawab Akbar Khan Bugti in 1952. The group believed in Baloch nationalism and fought for autonomy and more economic and political rights. The group took an active part in the 1960s and 1970s Insurgencies in Balochistan. However, it lost most of its fighters in Pakistani military operations and some of the surviving fighters went underground.

In 2004, Nawabzada Brahamdagh Khan Bugti (the grandson of Akbar Bugti) regrouped the Bugti Militia fighters and formed the Baloch Republican Army.

== See also ==
- Baloch Republican Army
- Balochistan conflict
- Balochistan Liberation Army
- Baloch Students Organization
- Balochistan Liberation Front
- Popular Front for Armed Resistance
