= Gulzar Imam =

Pakistani separatist leader

- گلزار امام
- Born: 1978 (age 47–48); Panjgur, Balochistan,
- Military career
- Rank: commander BRA and BNA
- Nickname: Shambay
- Commands: Baloch Republican Army; Baloch Nationalist Army
- Conflicts: Insurgency in Balochistan; 2022 Lahore bombing; 2022 Panjgur and Naushki raids

Gulzar Imam (born 1978, Panjgur District, Balochistan) is a Baloch nationalist politician and militant leader. He served as a senior commander of the Balochistan Republican Army (BRA) and was one of the co-founder of the Baloch Nationalist Army (BNA). He was arrested in Turkey in 2023 and subsequently extradited to Pakistan.

== Early life ==
Gulzar Imam was born in 1978 in the Panjgur district of Balochistan where he received his early education. During his university years, he joined the Baloch Students Organization, in which he became an active member.

== Militant career ==
Following the killing of Akbar Bugti in 2006, armed conflict intensified between Baloch nationalist groups and Pakistani state forces. That same year, Barhamdagh Bugti established the Balochistan Republican Party and its military wing, the Balochistan Republican Army. Imam rose to the rank of senior commander within the BRA and was reported to have planned several of its operations.

In 2017, internal disputes emerged between Imam and Bugti over the leadership of the organisation. Bugti publicly accused Imam of involvement in smuggling and kidnapping. In 2018, Imam was expelled from the BRA on allegations of extrajudicial killings and extortion, after which he established a breakaway BRA faction. In 2022, together with Sarfaraz Bangalzai, a commander of the United Balochistan Army, he co-founded the Baloch Nationalist Army.

== Arrest and extradition ==
On 22 November 2023, Turkish authorities announced the arrest of Gulzar Imam upon his entry into the country via Iran. He was subsequently handed over to Pakistani authorities.
