= Nawaz Marri =

Pakistani judge

Mir Muhammad Nawaz Marri (Urdu: مير محمد نواز مری) was a Pakistani judge of the Balochistan High Court. His brother, Justice Mir Khudabaksh Marri, served as chief justice of Balochistan High Court and Governor of Balochistan. Nawaz Marri was also appointed as Chief Justice of Balochistan High Court. He was assassinated in a gun attack in Quetta in January 2000. He is survived by his spouse, 4 children and 11 grandchildren.

== Assassination ==
On January 7, 2000, Muhammad Nawaz Marri was assassinated . The murder was allegedly carried out by the orders of Khair Bakhsh Marri by his sons Balach Marri, Ghazan Marri and Mehran Marri. The accusations against the Marri tribal chief for the assassination led to the beginning of the fifth Baloch Insurgency.

== See also ==
- Balochistan High Court
- Nawab Khair Bakhsh Marri
- Hyrbyair Marri
- Balach Marri
- Changez Marri
- Ghazan Marri
- Mehran Marri
- Hamza Marri
