= Popular Front for Armed Resistance =

Baloch nationalist militant group

Popular Front for Armed Resistance, or PFAR, was a terrorist outfit formed in the 1960s by Ishaque Mohammad Shah and Sher Mohammad Marri. The group was responsible for a series of bomb blasts in Pakistan. It was a part of the Balochi tribal separatist-nationalist groups, which carried out serial bomb attacks and fought an armed insurgency against Pakistan's military. PFAR's aim was independence of the Balochistan province from Pakistan. There has been no accurate independent estimate of the size or strength of PFAR. Most of the outfit's activists were trained in Afghanistan. For the outfit, Afghanistan was a good place to obtain weaponry and others goods.

In 1974, at Zulfikar Ali Bhutto's peace proposal, the group announced an end to the insurgency, which had by that time claimed the lives of 5,300 Balochi fighters and 3,300 army personal. As a result of Bhutto breaking his promise and restarting the operation in Balochistan, some 20,000 Balochi tribesmen had again picked up arms against the Pakistani Army.

In 1974, PFAR carried out series of bomb attacks in various cities of Pakistan. The outfit also claimed responsibility for bomb explosions at a political rally in Karachi. The political rally was to be attended by Zulfiqar Ali Bhutto. In the same year, Pakistani security forces launched series of counter-terrorism operation against the outfit. Iran also offered external assistance to these counter-terrorism operations. Iran supplied Pakistan with Gun-ship helicopters and pilots to assist Pakistan.

As a result of the counter-terrorism operations, the outfit was considerably weakened and it lost its ability to carry out guerrilla attacks against Pakistan. Currently, it is believed that the group is inactive.

== See also ==
- Balochistan conflict
- Balochistan Liberation Army
- Balochistan Liberation Front
- Baluch People's Liberation Front
- Baloch Students Organization
- Baloch Students Organization – Awami
