= 1960s insurgency in Balochistan =

Conflict between Balochi separatists against Iran and Pakistan

- Part of the Insurgency in Balochistan
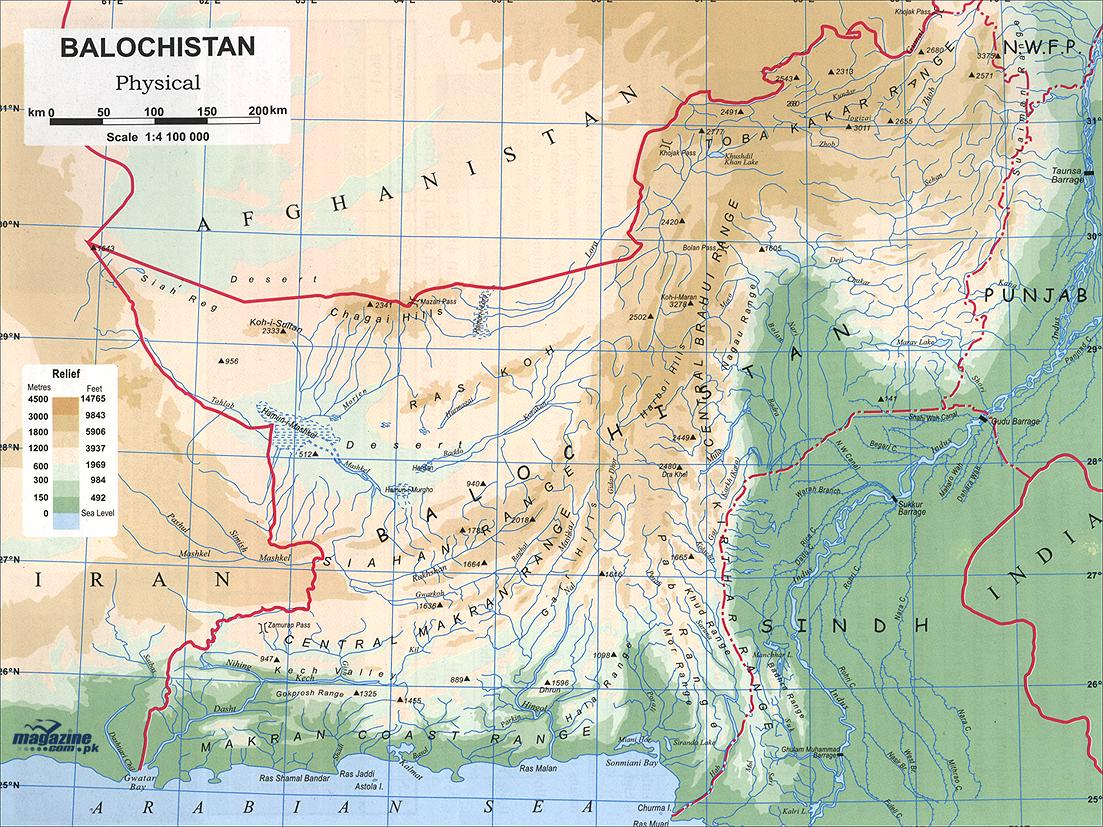
- Physical map of Balochistan, Pakistan, where the fighting took place.
Date	1963 – 1969
Location	Balochistan, Pakistan
Result	Ceasefire and end of insurgency: General amnesty to militants; Abolition of the One Unit Scheme

Belligerents
Pakistan (Pahlavi Iran) Iran; Supported by: (Muscat and Oman) Oman	Baloch separatist groups Supported by: Afghanistan; Iraq; Syria

Commanders and leaders
(Pakistan) Ayub Khan (Pakistan) Yahya Khan	Sher Mohammad Marri; Mir Ali Mengal

Units involved
Pakistan Army; Pakistan Air Force	Parrari; PFAR; BLF; Bugti militia

The 1960s insurgency in Balochistan refers to an insurgency by Baloch separatists against the Pakistani government lasting from 1963 till 1969 with the aim to force Pakistan to share revenues from gas reserves in Balochistan, freeing up of Baloch prisoners and dissolution of One Unit Scheme.

== Background ==
Following the introduction of a new constitution in 1956 which limited provincial autonomy and enacted the 'One Unit' concept of political organisation in Pakistan. Tension continued to grow amid consistent political disorder and instability at the federal level. Multiple Baloch parliament members were dismissed. The federal government tasked the Pakistan Army with building several new bases in key areas of Balochistan. The Basic Democracies during Ayub military regime gave an indirect representation which created democratic problems in Pakistan as the representation of the Baloch was reduced in the non-democratic constitution of 1962 as the baloch provinces and territories were merged into West Pakistan. The unrelenting denial of the military regime to lodge the Baluch interests, and the brandishing of such interest as sub-nationalist, took several political protesters to drive for a separate Baluch state and radical and leftist Baluch political parties like Baluch National Liberation Front, and the Baloch Student Organization were launched and they started agitations and protests against Ayub regime. They organized and arranged different gatherings in different areas of Baluchistan and as a result, the second rebellion in Baluchistan broke out from the Marri tribal area in 1962.

== Insurgency ==
Sher Muhammad Bijrani Marri led like-minded militants into guerrilla warfare from 1963 to 1969 by creating their own insurgent bases. Their goal was to force Pakistan to share revenue generated from the Sui gas fields with the tribal leaders and lifting of One Unit Scheme. The insurgents bombed railway tracks and ambushed convoys and raided on military camps.

=== PFAR ===
Popular Front for Armed Resistance, or PFAR, was a separatist organisation formed during the 1960s. The group is responsible for series of bomb blasts in Pakistan. Most of outfit's activists were trained in Afghanistan. For the outfit, Afghanistan was good place to obtain weaponry and others goods.

=== Parrari ===
Parrari or Parari was a terrorist outfit founded by Sher Mohammad Marri in the 1962. The outfit was responsible for series of attacks against Pakistani civilians and security forces. The outfit continued its attacks until 1969. Sher Mohammad Marri was the first Baloch to use the tactics of modern guerrilla warfare against the government. In early 1960s his Parari fighters attacked the Pakistani Armed Forces in the Marri area and in Jahlawan under Mir Ali Muhammad Mengal. This campaign came to an end in 1967 with the declaration of a general amnesty.

=== Bugti militia ===
Bugti militia also actively partook in this conflict against the Pakistan Armed Forces.

=== BLF ===
Balochistan Liberation Front the group was founded by Jumma Khan Marri in 1964 in Damascus, and played an important role in the 1963–1969 in Sistan and Baluchestan province of Iran, which had ultimately spilled over into Pakistani Balochistan, because of BLF launching raids on Pakistani outposts. It had also participated in the 1973–1977 insurgency. Iraq openly and quite actively supported the group against Pakistan and Iran by providing financial support, weapons and training which led to 1973 raid on the Iraqi embassy in Pakistan. Syria also provided support to this group.

== Military response ==
The Pakistan Army retaliated by destroying the militant camps. Pakistan Army and Pakistan Air Force led a bombing campaign using attack helicopters and fighter jets respectively in areas with a separatist presence.

== Ceasefire and Aftermath ==
This insurgency ended in 1969, with the Baloch separatists agreeing to a ceasefire granting general amnesty to the separatists as well as freeing the separatists. In 1970 Pakistani President Yahya Khan abolished the "One Unit" policy, which led to the recognition of Balochistan as the fourth province of West Pakistan (present-day Pakistan), including all the Balochi princely states, the High Commissioners' Province, as well as Gwadar, an 800 km^{2} coastal area purchased from Oman by the Pakistani government.

== See also ==
- First Kalat Rebellion
- Second Kalat Rebellion
- 1970s operation in Balochistan
- Insurgency in Balochistan
- Operation Radd-ul-Fasaad
