= 1993 Balochistan Provincial Assembly election =

1993 election in Pakistan

Elections to the Provincial Assembly of Balochistan were held in 1993.

== Results ==
Constituency-wise result
Constituency Number	Constituency Name	Name	Party
PB-1	Quetta I	Kalimullah Khan	PKMAP
PB-2	Quetta II	Malik Gul Zaman	PML(N)
PB-3	Quetta III	Saeed Ahmed Hashmi	PML(N)
PB-4	Quetta IV	Abdul Waheed	BNM(M)
PB-5	Chagai	Haji Sakhi Dost Mohammad Notezai	JWP
PB-6	Pishin I	Maulana Abdul Bari	IJM
PB-7	Pishin II	Mohammad Sarwar Khan Kakar	Independent
PB-8	Killa Abdullah I	Abdul Qahar Khan Wadan	PKMAP
PB-9	Killa Abdullah II	Abdul Hameed Khan	PKMAP
PB-10	Loralai I	Sardar Muhammad Tahir Khan	Independent
PB-11	Loralai II	Obaidullah Jan	PKMAP
PB-12	Loralai III	Mir Tariq Mehmood Khetran	Independent
PB-13	Zhob-cum-Killa Saifullah	Haji Muhammad Shah	JUI(F)
PB-14	Zhob	Shaikh Haji Jaffar Khan Mandokhail	PML(N)
PB-15	Killa Saifullah	Moulana Abdul Waseh	IJM
PB-16	Sibi	Changez Khan Marri	Independent
PB-17	Ziarat-cum-Sibi	Sardar Nawab Khan Tarin	ANP
PB-18	Kohlu	Ghazan Marri	Independent
PB-19	Dera Bugti	Saleem Akbar Bugti	JWP
PB-20	Jaffarabad I	Mir Abdul Nabi	PML(N)
PB-21	Jaffarabad II	Mir Khan Muhammad Khan	Independent
PB-22	Jaffarabad-cum-Nasirabad	Zahoor Hussain Khan	JWP
PB-23	Tambo	Mir Muhammad Sadiq Umrani	
PB-24	Kachhi I	Mir Laskari Khan Raisani	PNP
PB-25	Kachhi II	Sardar Mir Chakar Khan	DIP
PB-26	Jhal Magsi	Nawab Zulfiqar Ali Magsi	Independent
PB-27	Mastung	Nawab Abdul Rahim Shahwani	JWP
PB-28	Kalat-cum-Mastung	Muhammad Attaullah	IJM
PB-29	Kalat	Mir Israrullah Zehri	Independent
PB-30	Khuzdar I	Sardar Sanaullah Zehri	
PB-31	Khuzdar II	Sardar Muhammad Akhtar Mengal	
PB-32	Awaran	Mir Abdul Majeed	PML(N)
PB-33	Kharan	Sardar Muhammad Hussain	Independent
PB-34	Lasbela I	Jam Muhammad Yousaf	PML(N)
PB-35	Lasbela II	Sardar Muhammad Saleh Bhotani	PPP
PB-36	Panjgur	Kachkol Ali	BNM(H)
PB-37	Turbat I	Abdul Malik	BNM(H)
PB-38	Turbat II	Muhammad Ayub Buledi	BNM(H)
PB-39	Turbat III	Muhammad Akram	BNM(H)
PB-40	Gwadar	Syed Sher Jan	PPP
Reserved for Christian		Bashir Masih	Independent
Reserved for Hindus		Arjan Dass	Independent
Reserved for Sikhs, Buddhists, and Parsis		Satram Singh	Independent
