= Changez Khan Marri =

Pakistani politician

- نواب چنگیز خان مری

Member of the Provincial Assembly of Balochistan
- Incumbent
- Assumed office 29 February 2024
- In office 2013–2018

Minister for Irrigation, Balochistan
- In office 2013–2018

Personal details
- Born: Changez Khan Marri; 1 April 1963 (age 63) Balochistan
- Party: PMLN (2013-present)
- Relations: Khair Bakhsh Marri (father); Hyrbyair Marri (brother); Balach Marri (brother); Ghazan Marri (brother); Mehran Marri (brother); Hamza Marri (brother)
- Children: Nawabzada Buzair Marri (Son) Nawabzada Khuda Yar Marri (Son) Nawabzada Muhammad Marri (Son)
- Education: Aitchison College /(Moscow_State_University)/
- Profession: politician, Nawab of Marri tribe

Nawab Changez (Jangayz) Khan Marri (Urdu: نواب چنگیز خان مری; born 1 April 1963) is the Nawab of the Marri Baloch people in Pakistan. He is currently serving as a member of the Provincial Assembly of Balochistan since February 2024. He has served as Balochistan's Irrigation and Energy Minister from 2013 to 2018. He served as Balochistan's Communication Minister In the cabinet of Zulfiqar Ali Khan Magsi from 1993 to 1997.

== Family ==
Changez Khan Marri is the eldest son of the late Khair Bakhsh Marri and is the heir for the title of nawab, however a nawab is not in Balochi tradition rather a title given by the British during colonization. The previous chieftain of the Marri tribe was the Sardar but due to conflict with the british and other reasons the title of the head of tribe was taken away and given to the Gazaini sub tribe of Marri. His brothers are Hyrbyair Marri, Balach Marri, Ghazan Marri, Hamza Marri and Mehran Marri.

== Politics ==
Marri was elected to the Provincial Assembly of Balochistan as a member of Pakistan Muslim League (N) in the 2013 Pakistani general election.

He was a contender for the Chief Minister of Balochistan.

An unidentified assassin threw a grenade at Marri's residence on 15 January 2016. The grenade failed to detonate and no one was harmed.

== See also ==
- Khair Bakhsh Marri
- Hyrbyair Marri
- Balach Marri
- Ghazan Marri
- Chairman Mir Mehrab Khan
- Mohabat Khan Marri
- Mir Humayun Khan Marri
- Marri (tribe)
- Kohlu
- Girsani
