= Baloch Raaji Aajoi Sangar =

Alliance of mostly Baloch militant groups

Baloch Raaji Aajoi Sangar Baloch National Freedom Movement
- بلوچ راجی آجوی سنگ
- Founders: Allah Nazar Baloch; Aslam Baloch †
- Leaders: Allah Nazar Baloch; Bashir Zeb
- Founded: 2018
- Dates active: 2018–present
- Country: Pakistan; Iran
- Groups: Balochistan Liberation Army; Balochistan Liberation Front; Baloch Republican Guards (from 2018); Baloch Republican Army (until 2022) (Note: In January 2022, the BRA, along with the United Baloch Army announced its merger with the Baloch Nationalist Army (BNA), ceasing activities as a separate group.); Baloch Nationalist Army (until 2023); Sindhudesh Revolutionary Army (from 2020)
- Wars: Insurgency in Balochistan: Sistan and Baluchestan insurgency; Insurgency in Sindh

The Baloch National Freedom Movement (Balochi: بلوچ راجی آجوی سنگر, romanized: Baloch Rāji Āājoi Sangar lit. 'Baloch National Freedom Movement'), abbreviated as BRAS or BNFM, is a united front of Baloch separatist groups aimed at the creation of a sovereign Balochistan. It includes several prominent Baloch armed groups, most notably the Balochistan Liberation Army (BLA) and Balochistan Liberation Front (BLF). The group was founded in November 2018 by Allah Nazar Baloch, leader of the BLF. The BRAS was formed to fight Pakistan's administration of Balochistan.

== Background ==
On 30 October 2017, the Balochistan Liberation Army (BLA) and the Balochistan Liberation Front (BLF) announced their intention to form an alliance and coordinate joint attacks against Pakistani security forces. Baloch Raaji Aajoi Sangar itself had later emerged from this initial alliance between the Balochistan Liberation Front (BLF) and the Jeeyand faction of the Balochistan Liberation Army (BLA-J) in 2017.

== Formation and expansion ==
In November 2018, the Baloch Raaji Aajoi Sangar was formed as an alliance of Baloch militant groups aimed at expelling Pakistan from the Balochistan region, with Allah Nazar Baloch suspected to be the mastermind behind the creation of the BRAS. . The initial members of the BRAS upon its creation were the BLA, BLF, and Baloch Republican Army (BRA). Later, the coalition was joined by the Baloch Republican Guards (BRGs) in April of 2018.

In July 2020, the Sindhudesh Revolutionary Army (SRA) announced its entry into the BRAS, marking the inclusion of a non-Baloch group into the alliance and the expansion of BRAS operations into Sindh. The SRA's entry into the BRAS also solidified the latter's claim of serving as a united front against what it describes as "Punjabi domination" in Pakistan.

== Activities ==
In March 2025, the BRAS announced its creation of a unified military outfit, which it named the Baloch National Army (not to be confused with Baloch Nationalist Army with the same name), in addition to an intensified offensive against both Chinese interests in Balochistan and Pakistan. The alliance announced this decision to transition the Baloch insurgency from a low-level scattered campaign toward an organized effort to combat Pakistan's military and intelligence operations.

BRAS militants have also clashed with Jaish al-Adl along the Iran–Pakistan border. The alliance launched Operation Aas-Rech in February 2020, attacking alleged Lashkar-e-Taiba militants in Kech district.

== Ban ==
On 26 July 2019, the Government of Pakistan officially proscribed Balochistan Raaji Ajooi Sangar as a banned terrorist organization along with Hizbul Ahrar. It was also added to the list of designated terrorist outfits.

== Members ==
- Balochistan Liberation Army
- Balochistan Liberation Front
- Baloch Republican Guards (from 2018)
- Baloch Republican Army (until January 2022) (Note: In January 2022, the BRA, along with the United Baloch Army announced its merger with the Baloch Nationalist Army (BNA), ceasing activities as a separate group.)
- Baloch Nationalist Army (until March 2023)
- Sindhudesh Revolutionary Army (from 2020)

== See also ==
- People's Fighters Front
