= Karima Baloch =

Baloch human rights activist from Pakistan's Balochistan province (1983–2020)

- کریمه بلۏچ
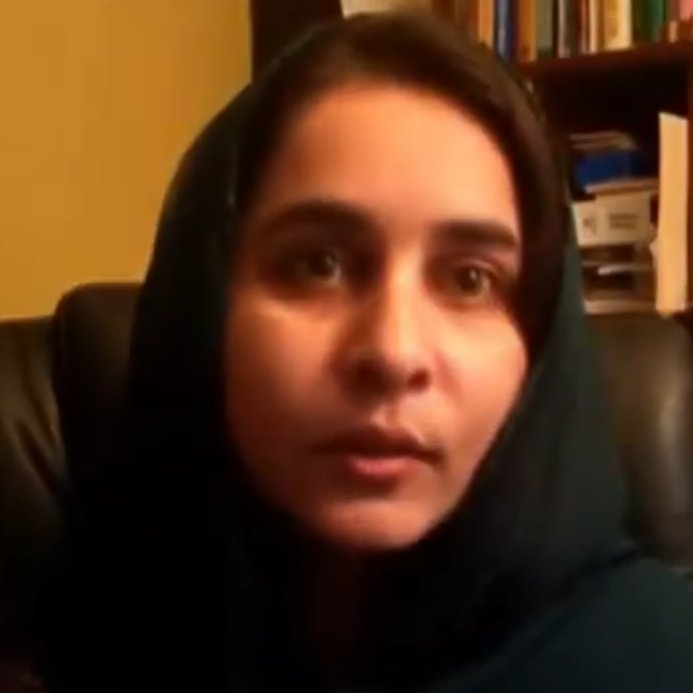
- 2016 screenshot of Karima Baloch
- Born: Karima Mehrab; 8 March 1983; Tump, Kech District, Balochistan, Pakistan
- Died: 20/22 December 2020 (aged 37); Toronto waterfront (Lake Ontario), Toronto, Canada
- Cause of death: Drowning
- Burial place: Tump, Kech District, Balochistan, Pakistan; 26.0983°N 62.3649°E
- Occupation: Human rights activist
- Years active: 2005–2020
- Organization: Baloch Students Organization (BSO)
- Known for: Advocacy for Baloch rights, criticism of the Pakistani government
- Spouse: Hammal Haider
- Relatives: Sameer Mehrab (brother), Mahganj Baloch (sister)
- Awards: BBC 100 Women (2016)

Karima Baloch (Balochi: کریمه بلۏچ; 8 March 1983 – 20/22 December 2020), also known as Karima Mehrab (کریمہ محراب), was a Baloch human rights and pro-independence activist from Balochistan, Pakistan. She was the first female chairperson of the Baloch Students Organization - Azad (BSO-Azad). She was included in the 100 Women List by the BBC in 2016, where she was identified as a political activist campaigning for the "independence for Balochistan from Pakistan."

In 2015, Karima fled Pakistan and took refuge in Canada after fearing for her life for speaking out against enforced disappearances and extrajudicial killings allegedly carried out by the Pakistani military. On 22 December 2020, her dead body was found submerged at Toronto's waterfront under circumstances that were described as suspicious by her family, as well as several politicians and activists including the Baloch Yakjehti Committee (BYC), who claimed she was killed by the Pakistani government. Despite Canadian authorities ruling her death as "non-criminal," her death raised significant concerns and demands for further investigation.

== Activist career ==
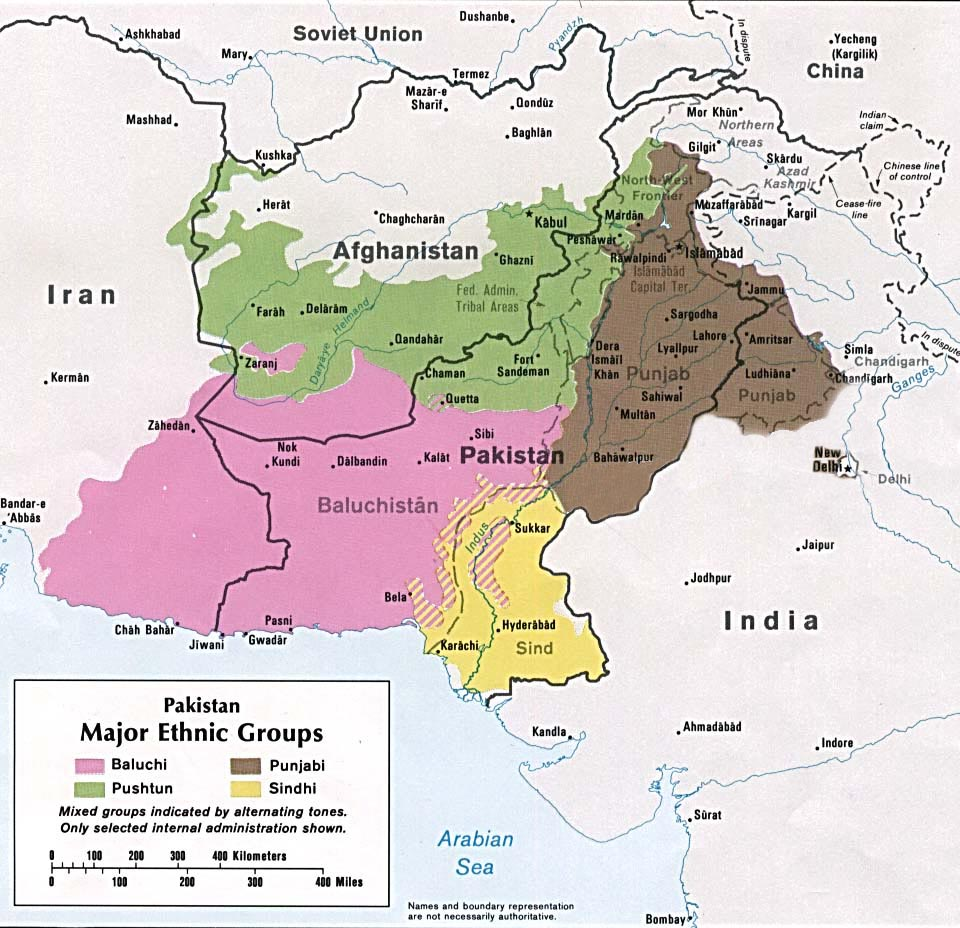

Baloch started her career as a human rights and independence activist in 2005, when she attended a protest in Turbat over forced disappearances in the Pakistani province of Balochistan, where she carried a picture of one of her missing relatives. She joined the Baloch Students Organization (BSO) in 2006, serving in several different positions and eventually becoming the organization's chairperson in 2015. During these years, Baloch travelled all over Balochistan, organizing outreach programs such as protests and rallies. A 2014 OZY article about her states, "In Islamabad, Pakistan's capital, Karima is seen as a dangerous political actor and a threat to the nation’s security. Meanwhile, a thousand kilometers southwest, deep inside Balochistan, she's a local hero and a beacon of hope."

In an interview in 2014, she said,

For us, peaceful struggle has been turned into a lethal poison. During the previous three years, many of our members have been brutally killed and thousands have been abducted. Two months back, the chairman of my organization was kidnapped right in front of my eyes. Before that, in 2009, the vice-chairman of our organization Zakir Majeed was kidnapped by the secret services while he was attending a crowded procession. He is still missing. [...] the noose has been tightened around our necks.

== Exile from Pakistan ==
In 2015, Baloch went into self-imposed exile after terrorism charges were filed against her by the Government of Pakistan,) with her younger sister Mahganj Baloch stating that, "She didn't go abroad because she wanted to, but because... open activism in Pakistan had become impossible." A year later, in 2016, she was granted asylum in Canada, where she lived until her disappearance and death in December 2020. In 2016, following Indian Prime Minister Narendra Modi's public speech on India's Independence Day in which he mentioned the situation in Pakistani Balochistan, Baloch addressed him in a video and thanked him for mentioning the issue, stating: "We will fight our own war, you just be our voice" (translation).

Baloch was included in the 100 Women List by the BBC in 2016, where she was identified as a political activist who "campaigns for independence for Balochistan from Pakistan". Baloch listed Dad Shah and Hatun Bibi—both Baloch rebels who fought against the Imperial State of Iran in Iranian Balochistan—as the primary inspirations behind her activism. In 2018, she raised issues related to gender inequality in Pakistan at the United Nations Human Rights Council. She also raised issues related to Balochistan in Canada, such as during a meeting in Toronto, where she mentioned Pakistani Military's role in Balochistan.

In December 2017, Baloch received a message that if she won't return to Pakistan, her uncle Noor Mohammed, a schoolteacher, will be killed. As she refused to go back, a few hours before her asylum hearing, on 2 January 2018, she got the news that her uncle had been found dead.

== Personal life and family ==
Baloch had two siblings, a brother named Sameer Mehrab and a sister named Mahganj Baloch. She married a fellow Baloch activist, Hammal Baloch (also known as Hammal Haider), in Toronto. Several members of her extended family have been linked to the Balochistan insurgency in Pakistan and Iran.

== Disappearance and death ==
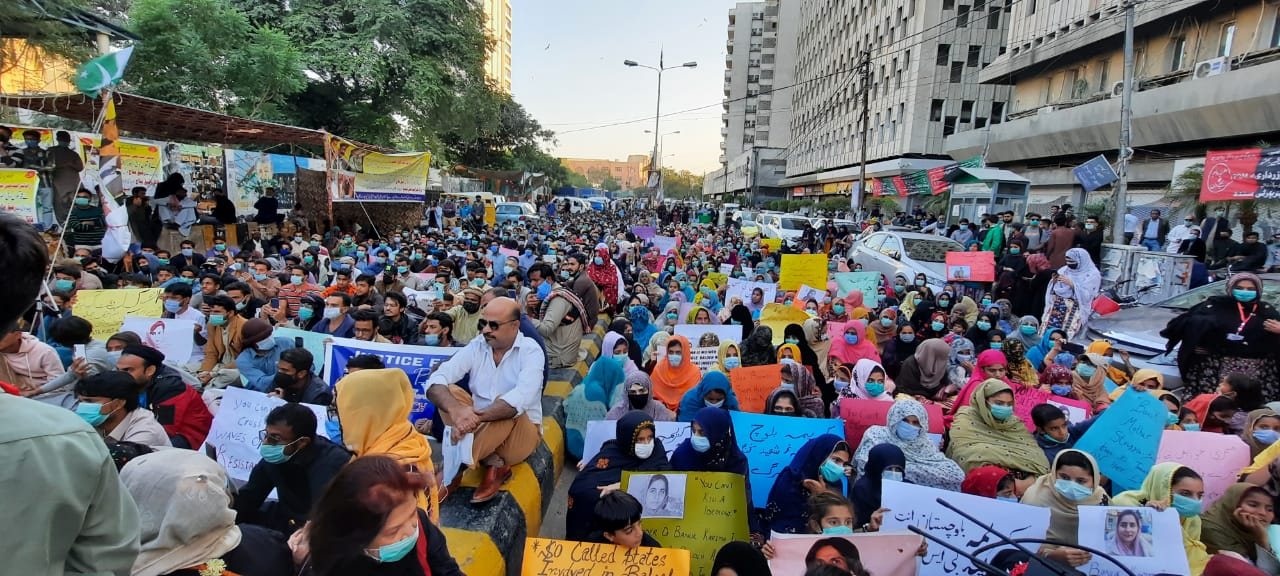
A protest in Pakistan following the discovery of Karima Baloch's body in Canada. Protests were held in Pakistani cities including in Lahore and Karachi.

Baloch was last seen alive on 20 December 2020. On 22 December 2020, her dead body was found submerged at the Toronto waterfront. The Toronto Police Service initially reported that her body was found near Lake Ontario, although no further details were given. CBC News reported that a close friend and fellow Baloch activist, Lateef Johar, said that "officers had told her family she was found drowned in the water". Small-scale protests demanding an investigation into her death occurred in Pakistani Balochistan and Canada; ethnic Baloch, Pashtun and Sindhi minority groups in Canada issued a joint statement in this regard. Canadian police acknowledged the concerns around Baloch's death, but stated that they had found no evidence of foul play, and concluded that her death was "non-criminal". In Canada, Baloch received multiple threats. As recalled by her husband, a few days before her death she received a message that said “You will receive a Christmas Gift for your deeds”. Chris Alexander, the former Canadian Minister of Immigration, Refugees and Citizenship, stated in a tweet: "All of us who knew Karima see the circumstances of her death as deeply suspicious. We must leave no stone unturned in uncovering & confronting the reality of what happened to her." CBC News conducted a year long investigation documenting evidence about how Karima's was likely killed by the Pakistani intelligence agency, in the podcast "The Kill List. Leading human rights advocates like Agnès Callamard, the Secretary General of Amnesty International, and Kiran Nazish, founding director of the Coalition For Women In Journalism vouched for this narrative".

Baloch's husband Hammal Haider openly blames the Pakistani military, especially the Pakistani ISI, for her killing. A few months before her death Sajid Hussain, a journalist who wrote about human rights violations in Balochistan, was found drowned in Sweden, where he had sought asylum.

Her inclusion in the BBC 100 list as a Baloch woman was repeated in 2024 when the Iranian Zhina Modares Gorji bookseller was also named for her struggle for freedom of speech.

== See also ==
- Insurgency in Balochistan
- Human rights violations in Balochistan
