= Hameed Baloch =

Pakistani activist

- حمید بلوچ
- Died: 11 June 1981; Mach prison, Pakistan
- Cause of death: Execution
- Occupations: Student; political activist
- Known for: Member of Baloch Students Organization (BSO), executed by Pakistan for allegedly firing at an Omani military officer

Hameed Baloch (Urdu: حمید بلوچ) was a Baloch student and member of the Baloch Students Organization (BSO) from Pakistan who was executed for killing an Omani military officer. He was arrested on 9 December 1979, while he was a student at Government Degree College Turbat, on charges of firing at a military officer from the Gulf state of Oman. The Omani military officer was recruiting Pakistani Baloch soldiers from Balochistan province to suppress the Dhofar Rebellion. Oman at the time was facing a Marxist–Leninist insurgency in its Dhofar province. Ever since Oman first took control of the enclave of Gwadar in Balochistan in the 18th century it had hired foot soldiers from the region to serve in the Sultan of Oman's Armed Forces. Oman ceded sovereignty over Gwadar to Pakistan in 1958.

The BSO, being a leftist organization, was opposed to the recruitment, and to the fight against the Dhofar rebels, whose ideology had similarities with its own. They saw it as aiming to 'pervert' the youth in Baloch society against Marxist–Leninist teachings by offering huge salaries for their services in a mercenary army.

Hameed was tried by a special military court and condemned to death. The death sentence was carried out on 11 June 1981 in Mach Jail.

== See also ==
- Balochistan conflict
- Baloch Students Organization
- Allah Nazar Baloch
- Political prisoner
