= 2022 Lahore bombing =

Attack in Punjab, Pakistan

Operation of Darra Bolan
- Location: Lahore, Punjab, Pakistan
- Date: 20 January 2022; 1:40 pm (UTC+5)
- Target: Anarkali Bazaar
- Attack type: Bombing
- Weapon: Improvised explosive device
- Deaths: 3-4
- Injuries: 48
- Perpetrator: Baloch Nationalist Army

On 20 January 2022, at least three people were killed and over 20 others injured by a bombing in Lahore, Punjab, Pakistan.

== Incident ==
At 1:40 pm, a 1.5 kilogram improvised explosive device exploded on a motorcycle parked next to a pushcart outside a bank in a busy market chowk in the Anarkali area of the city. It broke windows of nearby buildings and set fire to several parked motorcycles. The spokesperson of the Baloch Nationalist Army, claimed responsibility for this attack and said that it targeted bank employees. The attack was strongly condemned locally in Pakistan and internationally by the United Arab Emirates, Iran, Turkey, the United States and Bahrain.

The attack was also strongly condemned by leaders of Baloch terrorist groups including Mehran Marri and Brahumdagh Bugti. The condemnation by them highlighted the clash between the leaders of terrorist groups aboard and by the fighters on ground.

== See also ==
- Insurgency in Balochistan
- Terrorist incidents in Lahore since 2000
