= Khuda Bakhsh Marri =

Pakistani politician 1926–2006

Khuda Bakhsh Mari

Governor of Balochistan
- In office 5 July 1977 – 18 September 1978
- Preceded by: Ahmad Yar Khan
- Succeeded by: Rahimuddin Khan

Acting Chief Minister of Balochistan
- In office 24 December 1988 – 5 February 1989
- Preceded by: Mir Zafarullah Khan Jamali
- Succeeded by: Nawab Akbar Khan Bugti

Chief Justice of the Balochistan High Court
- In office 01 December 1976 – 16 July 1977
- Succeeded by: Abdul Hayee Qureshi
- In office 18 September 1978 – 25 March 1981
- Preceded by: M. A Rashid
- Succeeded by: Zakaullah Lodi

Justice of the Balochistan High Court
- In office 21 October 1970 – 25 March 1981

Justice of the Sindh-Balochistan High Court
- In office 1969 – 21 October 1970

Personal details
- Born: 1926 Kohlu, Balochistan, Pakistan
- Died: 14 May 2006 (aged 79–80) Switzerland
- Occupation: Judge, politician, author

Justice Mir Khuda Bakhsh Marri (1926 – 14 May 2006) (Urdu: خدابخش مری) was a Pakistani judge, politician, and author. He served as the Chief Justice of the Balochistan High Court and held several other prominent positions in the judiciary and government of Balochistan.

== Early life and education ==
Marri was born in 1926 in Kohlu, Balochistan. He began his schooling in Kohlu and Sibi before moving to Karachi for higher education. He completed his Bar-at-law from Lincoln's Inn in London in 1956.

== Career ==
Marri started his career as a lawyer and later became a judge. He was appointed as a Judge of the Sindh-Balochistan High Court in 1969 and served as the Chief Justice of the Balochistan High Court in 1977. He also served as Governor of Balochistan 1977 and 1978 and as acting Chief Minister of Balochistan in 1989.

=== Literary work ===
In addition to his contributions to the judiciary and government, Marri was also an author. He wrote several books on various topics, including Balochistan. His famous book is "A Judge May Speak".

== Personal life ==
Marri was the elder brother of Justice Mohammad Nawaz Khan Marri and Senator Mir Mohabat Khan Marri. His son Mir Shahnawaz Marri served as D.G Mines and Minister of Sports and Culture.

== Death ==
Justice Khuda Bakhsh Marri died in Switzerland at the age of 80.
