= Balach Marri =

Baloch militant and separatist (1966–2007)

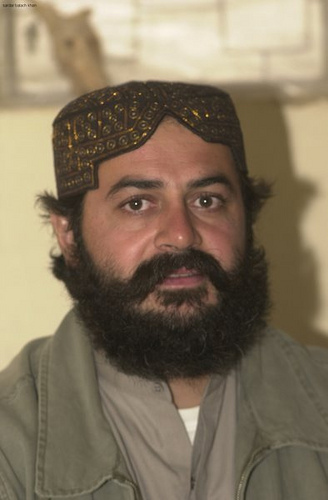
- Nawab Balach Khan Marri
- Born: January 17, 1966; Moscow, Russia
- Died: November 20, 2007 (aged 41); Afghanistan
- Children: Nawabzada Rohail Marri
- Relatives: Khair Bakhsh Marri (father); Hyrbyair Marri (brother); Ghazan Marri (brother); Hamza Marri (brother); Mehran Marri (brother); Changez Marri (brother)
- Military career
- Allegiance: Baloch Liberation Army (BLA)
- Rank: Leader
- Conflicts: Insurgency in Balochistan †

Balach Marri (Urdu: مير بالاچ مری; 17 January 1966 – 20 November 2007) was a Pakistani Baloch separatist militant who founded the Balochistan Liberation Army (BLA), a militant organisation operating from Afghanistan, which is listed as a terrorist group by the United Nations, Pakistan, Iran, China, the United Kingdom, the United States and the European Union.

== Personal life ==
Marri was one of six sons of Balochistan politician Khair Bakhsh Marri. Marri's brothers are Hyrbyair Marri, Ghazan Marri, Hamza Marri, Mehran Marri, and Changez Marri.

== Leader of Baloch Liberation Army (BLA) ==
Balach Marri was one of the major leaders of the Baloch Liberation Army (BLA). His death caused a split in the BLA. Since Hyrbyair Marri was arrested in United Kingdom, Mehran Marri took control of BLA. Mehran was accused of running the affairs of the BLA in a mismanaged manner. The rift between Mehran Marri and Hyrbyair Marri led to the creation of United Baloch Army (UBA). BLA leadership has accused Mehran and his companions of stealing $3 million funds and $800 million worth of weapons from BLA, with which they launched UBA. United Baloch Army is a breakaway faction of Baloch Liberation Army and is currently run by Mehran Marri.

Moreover, after Balach Marri's death BLA was greatly weakened in North-Eastern and Central part of Balochistan.

== Murder of Akbar Bugti ==
The Chairman of the Baloch Youth Council (London), Waja Mir Hazar Khan Baloch, stated that Balach Marri was behind the murder of Akbar Bugti. He stated that Brahamdagh Bugti told him that the cave in which Akbar Bugti was hiding in, came down due to blast by remote control and Balach Marri was standing just outside the cave at that time.

Moreover, Baloch Youth Council (London) stated that an Indian diplomat had organized a meeting between Harbiyar Marri and Brahamdagh Bugti to resolve misunderstanding among them. The council claimed that Indian intelligence wing RAW was also present in the meeting between the two leaders. Indian intelligence officials and diplomats tried to persuade them to resolve difference among themselves. Harbiyar Marri wanted full independence and form government-in-exile. While Brahamdagh Bugti rejected Harbiyar's plan and claimed that he was the international leader.

== Death ==
Balach Marri was killed in Afghanistan on 21 November 2007. According to some sources, Marri was killed in a North Atlantic Treaty Organization (NATO) airstrike in Afghanistan. NATO officials had mistaken him and his men for Taliban fighters and conducted airstrike on them, resulting in Marri's death.

However, Abdul Qadeer Baloch also known as Mama Qadeer, said that Khair Bakhsh Marri believed that Hyrbyair Marri was behind the killing of Balach Marri. He made these remarks while reading out the last message of Khair Bakhsh Marri. In the message, Khair Bakhsh Marri questioned the circumstances surrounding the death of Balach Marri, and claimed that Hyrbyair Marri was the one who had assassinated him.
