= Hyrbyair Marri =

Baloch activist

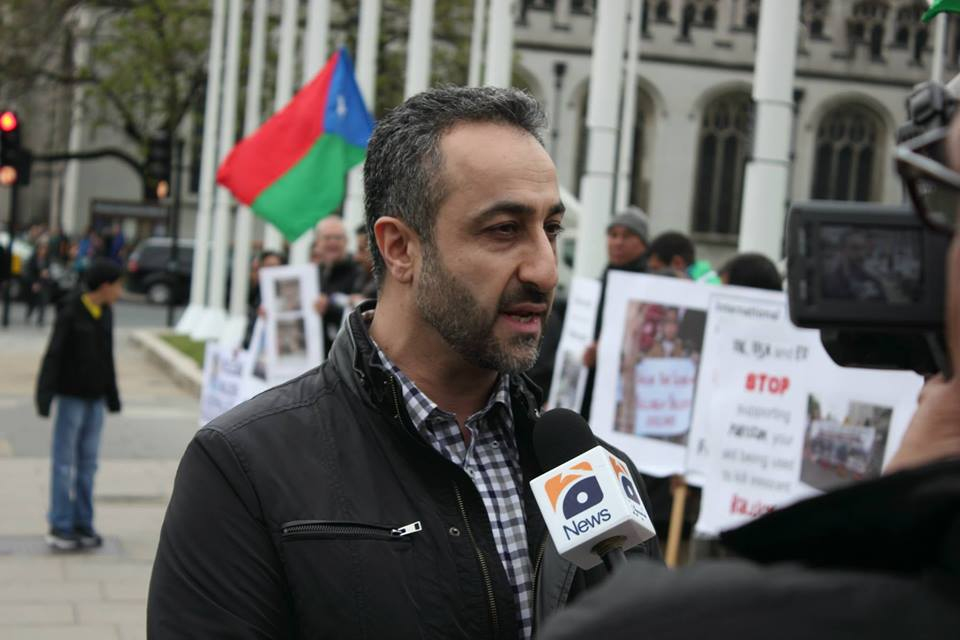
- Hyrbyair Marri speaking to media in London during a protest 19 December 2013

Personal details
- Born: Hyrbyair Marri; January 13, 1968 (age 58) Quetta, Balochistan, Pakistan
- Relations: Khair Bakhsh Marri (father); Changez Marri (brother); Balach Marri (brother); Ghazan Marri (brother); Mehran Baluch (brother); Hamza Marri (brother)
- Education: Moscow State University

Hyrbyair Marri (Balochi: حیربیار مری, born 1968) is an activist from the Pakistani province of Balochistan, and president of the Free Balochistan Movement. He is the fifth son of the Baloch nationalist leader Khair Bakhsh Marri. As of 2017, he resides in London.

== Early life ==
Hyrbyair was born in Quetta as the fifth son of Khair Bakhsh Marri, the sardar of the Marri tribe. Hyrbyair's elder brothers are Changez Marri, Balach Marri, Ghazan Marri and Hamza Marri; his younger brother is Mehran Baluch. In 1980 he came to the United Kingdom with his family, before they moved to Afghanistan in 1981 during General Muhammad Zia-ul-Haq's regime. He completed his early education in Quetta and Kabul before moving to Moscow for higher education at the Moscow State University.

== Political activities and asylum ==
Marri returned to Balochistan in 1992. His father was too old to start a new political struggle so his brother Balach Marri took his father's place. In 1997, Hyrbyair was elected to the Provincial Assembly of Balochistan and was appointed Communion Minister of the province. In 2000, Balochistan Police arrested and charged his father with the murder of Balochistan High Court justice Nawaz Marri; Hyrbyair left Balochistan for Britain at this time.

Marri was tried and acquitted of terrorism charges by a British court in 2009. The British government granted his request for political asylum in 2011.

In October 2015, India confirmed the presence of a representative of Baloch leader Nawabzada Hyrbyair Marri in New Delhi, signalling a potential shift in its stance toward separatist movements in Pakistan. Responding to a report by The Hindu, Ministry of External Affairs spokesperson Vikas Swarup stated that the representative’s presence reaffirms India’s long-standing tradition of offering refuge to persecuted individuals from across the world.

In November 2024 Hyrbyair Marri condemned the joint-airstrike conducted by both Iran and Pakistan in the Panjgur Region of Pakistani Balochistan, which was done against Jaysh al-Adl.

He stated that:

“If Iran and Pakistan, despite being separate powers, can unite against the Baloch people to protect their mutual interests, why can’t we, as Baloch supporters of independence, unite on the fundamental issue of the freedom of a united Balochistan?”

He also said that:

“As Baloch, we must see both Iran and Pakistan as occupiers of our land and organize our resistance accordingly.”

On top of this, he ended by saying:

“It is crucial, for the Baloch people to focus all their energies on resisting both Iran and Pakistan to secure the freedom of a united Balochistan. Only then can the Baloch nation succeed in defeating the genocidal policies of the occupying powers.”

== Controversies ==
In 2012, the United Baloch Army (UBA) broke away from the Baloch Liberation Army (BLA). According to them, this was due to financial fraud involving Hyrbyair Marri and his brother Mehran Marri, in BLA's funding.

The Government of Pakistan alleged that Marri is the founder and leader of the Balochistan Liberation Army, which is designated a terrorist organization by Pakistan, the United Kingdom and the United States.

In 2018, Hyrbyair Marri was among 13 individuals booked for terrorism charges by Pakistani authorities for masterminding the Chinese consulate attack in Karachi.
