= Jumma Khan Marri =

Pakistani Baloch political activist

- جمعه خان مری
- Born: Kohlu, Balochistan, Pakistan
- Education: PhD in Immunology and Allergies
- Alma mater: Russian State Medical University
- Organization: Overseas Pakistan Baloch Unity (OPBU)
- Website: Overseas Pakistani Baloch Unity

Jumma Khan Marri (Balochi: جمعه خان مری) is a Baloch political activist from Balochistan. He was the founder and formerly the leader of Baloch Liberation Front.

In February 2018, Marri stated that he and his followers have left the separatist groups. He stated that they had "sacrificed everything for a movement which turned out to be fundamentally faulty and empty from within". He also claimed that BLF and Baloch freedom struggle was hijacked by India. Marri insisted that India is behind the unrest in Balochistan. He disclosed that if India stops the money supplies, the insurgency will end the next day.

== Personal life ==
Jumma Khan Marri is the son of Mir Hazar Khan Marri. His father was Mir Hazar Khan Marri l. In 1986, he went to Moscow to pursue higher education, where he acquired his degree in Medicines at Russian State Medical University and later obtained PhD in Immunology and Allergies in 1998.

== Activities ==
In 1964, Jumma Khan Marri founded Baloch Liberation Front (BLF) in Damascus, Syria. Marri controlled BLF since its inception and it is unclear when he stepped down as the leader of the outfit.

In an interview with Russian news channel, Marri stated that he was the one who designed the 'free Balochistan flag'. He stated that he was among those people who were always on the forefront of Baloch freedom struggle. Marri said that he left Balochistan in 1979 and settled in Afghanistan along with his family. He stated that he has been in self imposed exile in Moscow since 2000. Moreover, he said that he "sacrificed everything for a movement which turned out to be fundamentally faulty and empty from within".

== Overseas Pakistan Baloch Unity (OPBU) ==
On 17 February 2018, Marri stated that he and his followers have left the separatist groups. He said that he is launching 'Overseas Pakistani Balochi Community' for the Baloch living aboard. The purpose of new organisation will be to confront and expose the "evil design" of people like "Brahamdagh Bugti, Hyrbiyar Marri and Mehran Marri". He states that Brahamdagh Bugti, Hyrbiyar Marri and Mehran Marri "are on the Indian payroll”. Marri announced his separation from separatist groups while attending a 'Pakistan Unity Day' event in Moscow.

Marri's decision to leave separatist groups was welcomed in Balochistan. A huge gathering took place in Kholu, Balochistan to welcome Marri's decision. Speaking from Moscow, Marri thanked people of Pakistan especially his supporters in Kholu for arranging such a big gathering to welcome his decision. He also asked the Balochs who are fighting against the state to lay down their weapons and start supporting development activities in the province. He stated that Indian funded so-called Baloch leaders were enjoying luxurious life in Europe while common Baloch was suffering from terrorism and violence. The gathering to welcome Marri's decision took place in Kholu which was once a stronghold of Baloch Liberation Army (BLA).

During an interview with Russian News channel, Marri stated that India is behind the unrest in Balochistan. He disclosed that if India stops the money supplies, the insurgency will end the next day. He said that majority of Baloch people have no problem with Pakistan. They have questions to the government just like every other normal citizen have for their government in their country around the world.

In September 2018, Marri visited Brussels where he held meetings with European Institutions for the awareness about the misuse of Human Rights Conventions by the terrorists. Marri told media in Brussels that 'during his meeting with European Institutions, he cautioned the policy makers about misuse of asylum by some terrorist from Balochistan under the pretext of human rights'. Some European countries have already rejected asylum to several Baloch leaders because of misuse of various forums to cause unrest among Baloch diaspora and in Balochistan.

While during his stay in Brussels, Marri also met with Baloch community in Europe to gain their support and to bring the misguided groups on the right track. Marri said that some Baloch are being allured by 'outside forces' in the name of nationalism which is only worsening the socio-economic plight of Baloch people. Marri also disclosed that he was offered funding from spy agencies of several countries to organize insurgencies in Balochistan, but over time he realized the real motive, which was to destabilize Balochistan. Such uprisings does not bring any dividends to people.

During his speech in United Nations Human Rights Council (UNHRC) in Geneva in 2019, Marri said that Pakistani law enforcement agencies had apprehended an Indian naval commander in Balochistan who confessed that India was behind unrest in the province. Marri also said that thousands of innocent people have been killed in Pakistan because of India's terrorist network who use Afghanistan as base to conduct their attacks.

On the China–Pakistan Economic Corridor (CPEC), Marri stated that the development of Gwadar Port, road networks and alternate power projects could offer great opportunities to Baloch people.

== See also ==
- Dad Shah
- Balochistan Liberation Army
- Baloch Students Organization
- Baloch Students Organization- Awami
- Baluchi Autonomist Movement
