= Al-Marri =

Al-Marri or Al Marri (Arabic: المري) is a Saudi/Qatari surname that may refer to

- Ali Rahma Al-Marri (born 1983), Qatari football midfielder
- Ali Saleh Kahlah al-Marri, Qatari suspected terrorist
- Fahad Al-Marri (born 1986), Qatari football referee
- Jaralla al-Marri, Qatari suspected terrorist
- Jaralla Al-Marri (footballer) (born 1988), Qatari football striker

== See also ==
- Marri
- Al Murrah
