= Sher Mohammad Marri =

Rebel and tribal leader who had waged war in Pakistan's Balochistan province

- Born: 1935; Kohlu, Baluchistan, British India
- Died: 11 May 1993 (aged 57–58); New Delhi, India
- Military career
- Service years: 1962–1977
- Rank: Militia commander
- Nicknames: Babu Shero, Shero Marri, General Sherof, Baloch Tiger
- Units: Parrari (1962–1969); Popular Front for Armed Resistance (1973–1977)
- Known for: Militancy, guerilla warfare
- Conflicts: Third Balochistan conflict Fourth Balochistan conflict
- Criminal information
- Status: Deceased
- Criminal charges: Insurgency and insurrection
- Penalty: 4 or 6 years' imprisonment with permanent exile upon release
- Wanted by: Government of Pakistan

Details
- Date apprehended: 1973

Sher Mohammad Marri (Balochi: میر شير محمد مری) was the chief of the Marri Baloch tribe in Pakistan, and an early leader in the Parrari movement which would lead to the formation of the Baloch Liberation Army, a militant nationalist group. A Marxist, he had close ties to leftist governments in Kabul and Moscow.

== Life ==
Sher Muhammad Marri was born in Kohlu, Balochistan, British India in 1935. He was also known as Babu Shero, Shero Marri, General Sherof and Baloch Tiger.

== Insurgency ==
Sher Mohammad was the first Baloch to use the tactics of modern guerrilla warfare against the government. In the early 1960s, his Parari fighters attacked the Pakistani Armed Forces in the Marri area and in Jahlawan under Mir Ali Muhammad Mengal. This campaign came to an end in 1967 with the declaration of a general amnesty.

In 1973, Marri was arrested for his role in the struggles against the government of Zulfikar Ali Bhutto. Upon his release in the late 1970s, Marri went into exile in Pakistan's Marxist neighbour, the Democratic Republic of Afghanistan. Following the fall of the Communist Afghan government in April 1992, Marri briefly returned to Pakistan but then he went to India. In his last few years, Sher Mohammad Marri saw the cause of Baloch nationalism evaporating. The Baloch nationalist movement was full of schisms and in a state of disarray. The Baloch nationalist became divided after a bitter dispute broke out between Sher Mohammad Marri and Khair Bakhsh Marri.

On 11 May 1993, Sher Mohammad Marri died in a hospital, in New Delhi, India.

== Bibliography ==
- Interview of Sher Mohammad Marri, Sher Mohammad Marri and Ahmed Shuja, Pakistan Forum, Vol. 3, No. 8/9, Focus on Baluchistan (May - Jun., 1973), pp. 38–40, Middle East Research and Information Project
- Political Terrorism: A New Guide to Actors, Authors, Concepts, Data Bases, Theories, & Literature By Albert J. Jongman, Alex Peter Schmid, ISBN 1-4128-0469-8
