= Baloch Students Organization – Awami =

Militant group in Pakistan

- Founded: 1972
- Type: Students union
- Location: Pakistan

The Baloch Students Organization-Awami or BSO-Awami was founded in 1972, when it split from the Baloch Students Organization (BSO). It supported Baluch People's Liberation Front, a militant organization in Balochistan against Pakistani control. The organization was Marxist-Leninist in its ideology. It was against the Sardari system in Balochistan.

Taj Baloch was the first chairman. He is currently in the government service. Abdul Nabi Bangulzai, a guerrilla leader, was the second chairman. The third chairman was Mulla Baksh Dasthi. He was killed by unknown gunmen in 2011.
