= Sajid Hussain (journalist) =

Pakistani journalist (1981–2020)

Sajid Hussain (16 January 1981 – 2020) was a Baloch journalist and the founder and chief editor of the online news site, the Balochistan Times. He went missing on 2 March 2020 and his body was found in the Fyris River on 23 April 2020. Swedish police ruled out any foul play, ruling that cause of death was drowning. An autopsy indicated that he died either by suicide or an accident.

== Biography ==
Hussain was an ethnic Baloch. He started his journalist career in the Pakistani newspapers, including Daily Times and The News International. In 2012, he wrote a series of reports on "enforced disappearances and human rights violations in Balochistan". Following a police raid, interrogations and alleged death threats, he fled the country, sought political asylum and lived in exile in Sweden since 2017. In 2015, he started the online magazine, the Balochistan Times.

== Death ==
Hussain fled Pakistan in 2012 after his house in Quetta was broken into while he was working on a story. Unidentified perpetrators stole his laptop and some of his notes. Fearing for his life, he went into self-imposed exile, living in Oman, the United Arab Emirates, and Uganda before arriving in Sweden in September 2017 as a refugee. His wife was expected to join him in Sweden later that year.

Hussain went missing on 2 March 2020 and was found dead in the Fyris River just north of Uppsala, Sweden, on 23 April. The body's identity became clear on 30 April. At the time of his death, Sajid Hussain was pursuing a master's of arts in Iranian languages at Uppsala University where he was also teaching Balochi language on a part-time basis.

Swedish police said that they had launched a murder investigation, but suspicions of foul play weakened following an autopsy. Hussain's autopsy indicated he could have committed suicide or his death was an accident. Swedish police ruled out any "visible wrongdoing" and the cause of death of Hussain was ruled to be drowning. In July, Swedish prosecution authority closed the investigation as they no longer suspect a crime has taken place. Hussain's family, friends, and Baloch rights activists accused the Pakistani government of causing his death, and said they were not satisfied with Swedish police's investigation;

Nine months later, another Baloch rights activist and friend of Hussain, Karima Baloch, went missing from Canada and was later found dead in a river under circumstances described as similar. The deaths of Hussain and Karima Baloch, both exiled Pakistani dissidents, drew attention for their striking similarities.
