= Baloch Nationalist Army =

Militant group in Pakistan

- بلوچ نیشنلسٹ آرمی
- Founders: Gulzar Imam; Sarfaraz Bangulzai
- Leaders: Gulzar Imam (2022–2023) (surrendered); Sarfraz Bangulzai (2023) (surrendered); Anwar Chakar (since march 2023)
- Spokesperson: Mureed Baloch
- Dates active: 2022–2023
- Merger of: United Baloch Army (UBA); Baloch Republican Army (BRA)
- Active regions: Balochistan, Pakistan; Kandahar, Afghanistan; Sistan and Baluchestan, Iran
- Ideology: Baloch nationalism Separatism ethnonationalism
- Status: Dissolved (only one faction)
- Wars: Insurgency in Balochistan

Baloch Nationalist Army (BNA) (Balochi: بلوچ نیشنلسٹ آرمی) is a militant group, fighting for the separation of Balochistan province. The group was formed on January 11, 2022, out of a merger of groups of the Baloch Republican Army (BRA), and the United Baloch Army (UBA). The <Gulzar Imam faction of BRA and the Sarfraz Bangulzai faction of UBA also announced their dissolution following the establishment of Baloch Nationalist Army.

Since its formation, the group was led by its founder, Gulzar Imam, who surrendered to the state of Pakistan in 2023. Following Gulzar's surrender, the group strength had considerably declined. Sarfraz Bangulzai succeeded Gulzar and served as the head of the group until his surrender in December 2023. The group was dissolved following the surrender of its top leader and remaining of its members. but new factions had since emerged.

== Background ==
Baloch Nationalist Army (BNA) is a Baloch nationalist militant umbrella group, which was seeking separation of Balochistan province from Pakistan. It was formed on 11 January 2022 and following its establishment, the Baloch Republican Army (BRA) and United Baloch Army (UBA) announced their dissolution and merger into Baloch Nationalist Army (BNA). BRA and UBA were militant groups and were responsible for various attacks on civilians, government officials, and Pakistani security forces.

== Attacks ==
=== 2022 Lahore Blast ===
On 20 January 2022, at least three people were killed and over 20 others were injured by a bombing in Lahore, Punjab, Pakistan. At 1:40pm, a 1.5 kilogram improvised explosive device exploded on a motorcycle parked next to a pushcart outside a bank in a busy market chowk in the Anarkali area of the city. It broke windows of nearby buildings and set fire to several parked motorcycles. The attack was claimed on Twitter by a spokesman for the Baloch Nationalist Army.

The blast in Lahore was strongly condemned by leader of Baloch nationalist groups like Mehran Marri and Brahumdagh Bugti. The condemnation by the leaders of Nationalist group highlighted the clash between the leaders of terrorists groups aboard and by the fighters on ground.

=== 2022 Panjgur and Naushki raids ===
The 2022 Panjgur and Naushki raids were a series of attacks on the Pakistan's Frontier Corps in Balochistan claimed by the Balochistan Nationalist Army (BNA), a newly formed Balochi separatist group with ties to the Balochistan Liberation Army. On February 2, the militants attacked both the Frontier Corps base in Nushki and an outpost in Panjgur District, as part of the insurgency in Balochistan.

== Decline and surrender of leader ==
=== Surrender of Gulzar Imam ===
Gulzar Imam, the founder and leader of Baloch Nationalist Army, was arrested in a high-profile intelligence-based operation by Pakistan's Inter-Service Intelligence (ISI) on 7 April 2023. He was considered to be one of the key militant commanders operating in the Makran belt of Balochistan province.

On 23 May 2023, Gulzar Imam (known by the alias of Shambay) had appeared before media and announced his surrender to the law enforcement agencies of Pakistan. He also urged other militants operating in the province to surrender and adopt a peaceful life, saying that rights could only be achieved through political and constitutional struggle. Gulzar also said that he sought apology from the family members of the people that were killed while he was serving as the head of BNA. Following Gulzar's surrender, Sarfraz Bangulzai alias Mureed Baloch was appointed as the new head of the Baloch Nationalist Army (BNA). BNA's attacks in Pakistan had also considerably declined following the surrender of Gulzar.

A new faction of the BNA had appeared shortly afterwards. It was led by Anwar Chakar. This faction had remained close to the militant groups of Baloch Raaji Aajoi Sangar.

=== Surrender of Sarfaraz Bangulzai and fall of the group ===
On 20 December 2023, Sarfaraz Bangulzai alias Mureed Baloch alongside 70 other militants, surrendered to the Government of Balochistan. Sarfraz said that he has quit violence and joined the national mainstream to play a constructive role in the development of the province and the country. Sarfraz joined the militancy in 2009 and carried out a number of attacks against civilians and law enforcement agencies of Pakistan. Sarfraz said that thousands of Baloch youth were killed during the past 20 years, adding that in 2014 alone, 155 innocent Baloch people were killed as they refused to give extortion to the militants. Sarfraz also said that he regretted his actions from the past 15 years. According to Sarfraz, he decided to surrender when he learned that his group was foreign funded and had the backing of India. Sarfraz alleged that India was responsible for funding militant groups in the province, and also urged other militant to surrender before the state.

Commanders like Sarfraz and Gulzar had been at the forefront of a low-level insurgency in Balochistan for more than two decades. Experts have described their surrender as a significant boost for government of Pakistan.

=== New split ===
A new faction emerges in September 2024. It is a splinter group of the Anwar faction and is led by Beebarg. The group operates in both Pakistan and Iran.

In April 2025, the Beebarg faction of BNA claimed responsibility in killing of eight Pakistani civilians in Sistan and Baluchestan Province in Iran.

== See also ==
- Separatist movements of Pakistan
