= Green Belt Theory =

Geopolitical theory

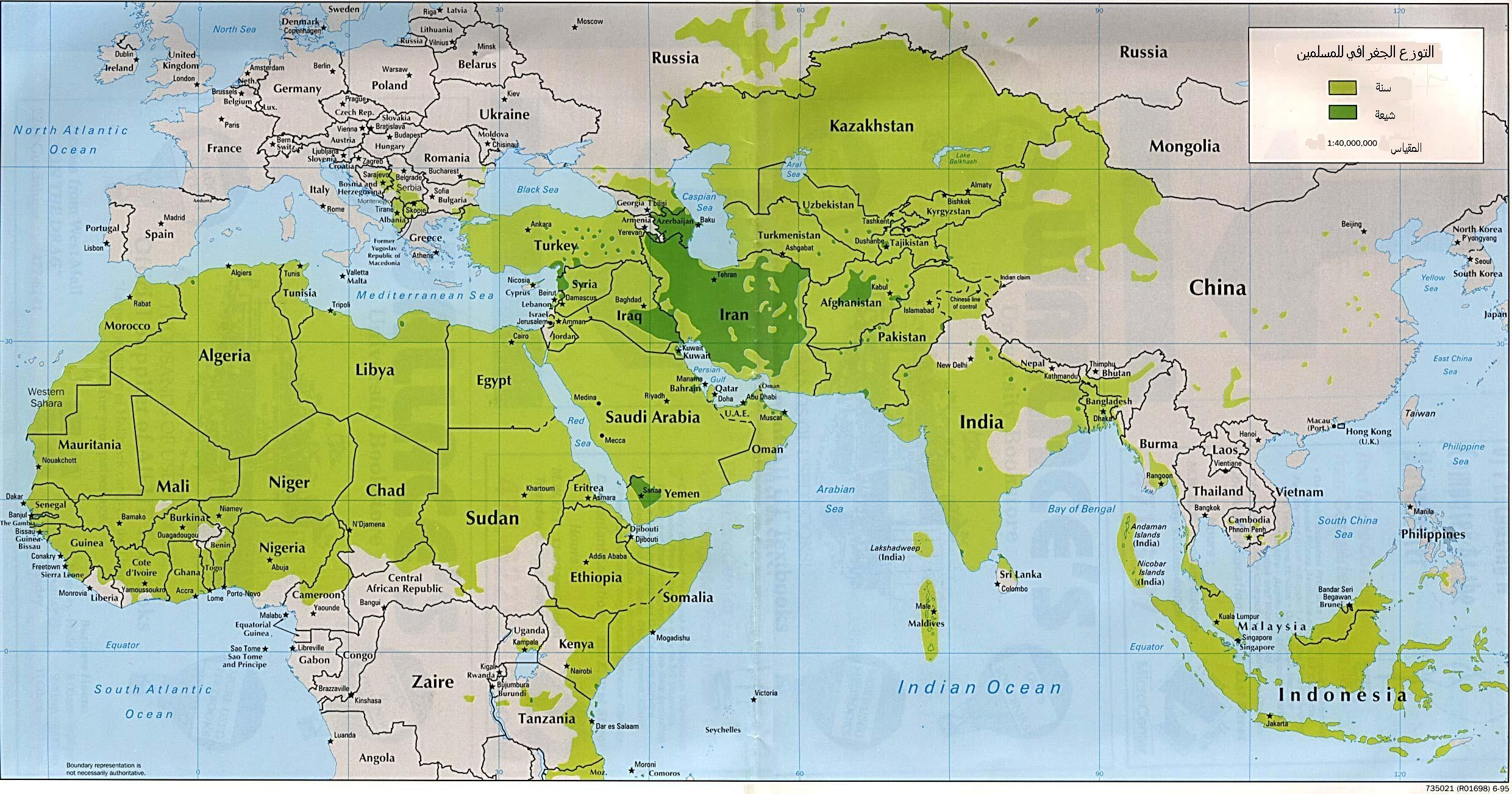
Map of the Islamic world, shaded green. The "Green Belt Theory" proposed that the Western powers aim to strengthen Islamic regimes as a bulwark against the Soviet Union.

The Green Belt Theory is a geopolitical containment strategy that was developed during the Cold War era. It proposed Western support for Islamic movements in Muslim-majority countries on the southern periphery of the Soviet Union to create an "Islamic belt" as a bulwark against Soviet influence.

== Background ==
From the nineteenth century, Lord Curzon brought with him a strategy of creating "a Moslem nexus of states" in the Middle East as a shield against Russian expansion. He proposed to take advantage of the situation by putting his British-sponsored Moslem nexus of states into place, when the Bolshevik Revolution brought about Russia's withdrawal from her forward positions. That nexus would have been a line across the Middle East from the Ottoman Empire through the Persian Empire to the khanates and emirates of Central Asia and Afghanistan in the nineteenth century.

== Iranian Revolution ==
The idea is often linked to proposals associated with Zbigniew Brzezinski, President Jimmy Carter's National Security Adviser, who, following the overthrow of the Iranian shah in 1979, discussed the possibility of an "arc of Islam" forming a barrier to Soviet expansion toward the Persian Gulf. This concept envisioned a loosely aligned set of Muslim-majority states acting as a "cordon sanitaire" along the Soviet Union’s southern border.

Brzezinski's thesis was subsequently backed and expanded by William H. Sullivan, the last United States Ambassador to Iran under the shah, who supported the idea of an "Islamic" or "Green" belt as a means of undermining Soviet influence. Sullivan argued that a regional bloc drawn from a northern tier of non-Sunni Muslim states—including Syria, Iraq, and Iran—and characterized by a strong religious orientation could limit Soviet penetration and reduce the need for direct U.S. military involvement, and suggested that the emergence of Iranian-style theocratic political systems elsewhere in the region could further consolidate such a barrier.

Contemporary sources also discussed the idea of an "Islamic belt" in political commentary during the early 1980s. One 1982 report described Western industrial powers as having "hatched the idea of creating an Islamic Green Belt as a 'cordon sanitaire' against Soviet influence in the region", while warning that religious militancy could function as a "two-edged weapon" leading to regional instability.

== See also ==
- Operation Cyclone
