= Baloch Republican Guards =

Separatist militant group in Balochistan

- بلوچ ریپبلکن گارڈز
- Founder: Bakhtiar Domki
- Leader: Bakhtiar Domki
- Spokesperson: Dostin Baloch
- Dates active: 2012–present
- Active regions: Balochistan, Sindh, Pakistan
- Ideology: Baloch nationalism Separatism; Ethnonationalism
- Size: Unknown
- Part of: Baloch Raaji Aajoi Sangar
- Wars: Insurgency in Balochistan

Balochistan Republican Guard, a Baloch separatist militant group active in the Balochistan insurgency. The Republican Guard has been a member of the Baloch Raaji Aajoi Sangar coalition since 2018.

== History ==
The Balochistan Republican Guard was formed in 2012 after Bakhtiar Domaki and his wife were killed by unknown assailants. The group carried out its first operations in 2013. Initially, this group was active in the Sibi and Nasirabad areas. The Balochistan Republican Guard has gained notoriety in recent years for attacking Pakistani infrastructure trains.

== See also ==
- Separatist movements of Pakistan
