= Allah Nazar Baloch =

Pakistani Baloch separatist and militant leader born 1968

Doctor Allah Nazar Baloch
- اللہ نذر بلوچ
- Born: 2 October 1968; Mashkay Tehsil, Balochistan, Pakistan
- Spouse: Fazela Baloch
- Military career
- Rank: Leader
- Commands: Baloch Liberation Front (BLF)
- Conflicts: Insurgency in Balochistan

Allah Nazar Baloch (Urdu: اللہ نذر بلوچ, Balochi: الله نذر بلۏچ) (born 2 October 1968) is the current leader of the Balochistan Liberation Front (BLF), a militant group operating in Pakistan. Under his leadership, the group has claimed responsibility for attacks on civilians, journalists, government officials and law enforcement agencies.

Out of the total of 38 journalists killed in Balochistan between 2007 and 2014, Baloch Liberation Front and Baloch Liberation Army had claimed responsibility for killing 27 of those journalists. Nazar Baloch has also threatened to conduct attacks against schools in Pakistan. He made those threats while giving reference to the 2014 attack on school which took place in Peshawar.

== Background ==
Nazar Baloch was born on 2 October 1968 in remote area in the Mashkay tehsil of the Awaran district in Balochistan called Mehi.

== Militant activities ==
In February 2002, Nazar Baloch founded Baloch Student Organization-Azad (BSO-Azad) which openly advocated armed struggle against Pakistan. In 2003, he went underground to join separatist militants who were involved in armed conflict with Pakistan. He was arrested by law enforcement agencies on 25 March 2005 in the coastal city of Karachi in Sindh, where he had arrived to meet some of his old friends. Later on, he was released in 2008 after he had struck an agreement with Pakistani security officials that he will stay away from separatist militants. However, after his release, Nazar Baloch violated his agreement and re-joined the separatist militants.

Currently, Nazar Baloch is the head of Baloch Liberation Front (BLF). Nazar's brother and nephew were also part of the Baloch Liberation Front and both were killed in 2015. Nazar's cousin, Eid Mohammad (alias 'Sana'), was also a part of separatist militants until he voluntarily surrendered to law enforcement agencies of Pakistan in 2016. Eid Mohammad claimed that both Baloch Liberation Front and Baloch Liberation Army have committed atrocities against the Baloch people for their own personal gains.

On 30 July 2017, Nazar Baloch threatened to conduct attacks against school children in Pakistan while giving reference to the 2014 attack on school which took place in Peshawar.

On 31 October 2017, Pakistani security forces detained some people who were illegally trying to enter into Afghanistan. Later on, it was found that Nazar Baloch's wife, Fazela Baloch was also among them. During her detention, she was treated with respect and honour in accordance with Baloch tradition. She was released on 2 November 2017.

Wahid Kambar, who was regarded as the foundational architect of the BLF and mentor to Nazar Baloch, was abducted and subsequently arrested by Pakistani security agencies on 19 July 2024 in either the Kerman province or the Sistan and Baluchistan province of Iran. This was confirmed by BLF itself on 28 July 2024. Wahid Kambar had been active throughout the Insurgency in Balochistan, including both the Fourth Balochistan conflict and the recent Fifth Balochistan conflict.
