= Baluch People's Liberation Front =

Militant group

Baluch People's Liberation Front, also known as Baluch Awami Azadi Mahaiz or BPLF, was a militant group formed by Mir Hazar Khan Marri, a prominent Baluchi leader in 1976, led by Sher Mohammad Marri.

The group is currently believed to be inactive, as it hasn't carried out any attack against the Pakistani Army and Government since 2006.

== See also ==
- Balochistan conflict
- Balochistan Liberation Army
- Baloch Students Organization
- Balochistan Liberation Front
- Popular Front for Armed Resistance
