= Parrari =

Baloch separatist militant group

Parrari or Parari was a Baloch separatist militant group founded by Sher Mohammad Marri in the 1962. The outfit was responsible for series of attacks against Pakistani civilians and security forces. The outfit continued its attacks until 1969, when a ceasefire was negotiated. Some of its members then later formed the BPLF.

The outfit is currently inactive.
