= Girsani =

Valley in Pakistan

Girsini is a valley of Kohlu District and declared sub tehsil on 2012. The main tribes are, Qesrani, Zhing, Thingyani, Shaheja, Mazarani. Notable persons are Mirbaz Khan Marri, Mir Sherbaz Khan, Dr. Gul Baz Khan Marri, Wadera Ahmed Nawaz Zing, Wadera Saif Rahman Marri. Notable places are FC qila wilayat, Maqam e Waqar, Bala Dhaka, Pati Shaheja.
