= Mir Humayun Khan Marri =

Pakistani politician (died 2024)

Nawabzada Mir Humayun Khan Marri (Urdu: میر ہمایوں خان مری; died 17 October 2024) was a Pakistani politician who served as the Deputy Chairman of the Senate of Pakistan from 21 March 1997 to 12 October 1999.

Nawabzada Mir Humayun (Sohrab) Khan Marri was a prominent figure from the Marri tribe. He was the son of Nawabzada Ahmad Shah Marri and the grandson of the revered Nawab Mehrullah Khan Marri.

Nawabzada Mir Humayun Khan Marri, a prominent political figure from Kohlu district, made history by becoming the first and only politician from the region to be elected to the Balochistan Assembly three times. During his tenure, he earned a reputation as a key advocate for the development of Kohlu, particularly in the fields of education and healthcare.

He is widely credited with establishing schools and hospitals in the district, significantly improving access to vital services for local communities. His efforts played a pivotal role in shaping the future of the region, with many current officers in the military and bureaucracy having received their education in Kohlu, thanks to the educational institutions Nawabzada Marri helped establish. Nawabzada Marri's legacy continues to have a lasting impact on the socio-economic development of Kohlu district.

Nawabzada Mir Humayun Khan Marri died due to a cardiac arrest in Quetta on October 17, 2024, and buried on the outskirts of Quetta, surrounded by the Koh-i-Chiltan and Koh-i-Murdar mountains.
