= 1970s operation in Balochistan =

Conflict between Pakistan forces and Baloch-Pashtun separatists

- Part of the Insurgency in Balochistan and the Cold War
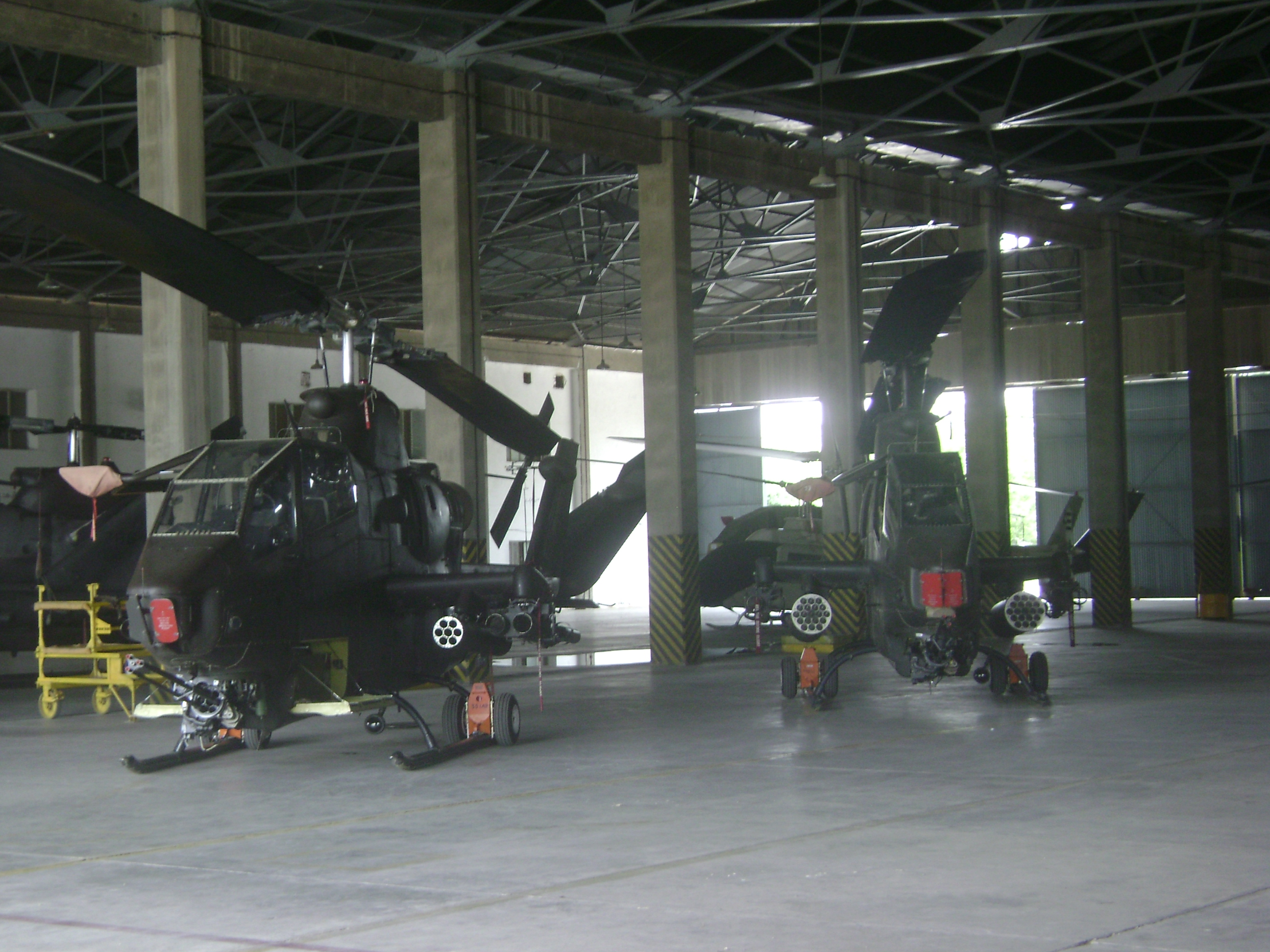
- Pakistan Army's Aviation Unit's HueyCobra AH-1S Cobra Attack Helicopters at AVN Base, Multan.
Date	February 1973 – November 1977
Location	Balochistan, Pakistan
Result	Pakistani victory: Insurgency halted; Baloch militant groups dismantled; Restoration of status quo ante bellum

Belligerents
Pakistan; Supported by: Iran; Oman	Balochistan People's Liberation Front; Pashtun zalmay Supported by: Afghanistan (Ba'athist Iraq) Iraq

Commanders and leaders
Zulfikar Ali Bhutto; Tikka Khan; Akbar Khan; Akbar Bugti (Only 1973); Armed by: Mohammed Reza Pahlavi; Post-combat: Rahimuddin Khan	Khair Bakhsh Marri (POW); Ataullah Mengal (POW); Ghaus Bakhsh Bizenjo (POW); Sher Mohammad Marri

Strength
80,000 (initial); 145,000 (peak)	20,000 (initial); 55,000(peak)

Casualties and losses
~3,000 casualties (including injured and killed)	~5,300 casualties 30,000 fled to Afghanistan after the operation
- ~16,000 civilian casualties 38,000 political prisoners arrested

The 1970s operation in Balochistan was a four-year military conflict in Balochistan, the largest province of Pakistan, between the Pakistan Army and Baloch separatists and tribesmen that lasted from 1973 to 1977.

The conflict began in 1973 shortly after then-Pakistani President Zulfikar Ali Bhutto dismissed the elected provincial government of Balochistan on the pretext that arms had been discovered in the Iraqi Embassy, ostensibly for Baloch rebels. The ensuing protest against the dismissal of the duly elected government also led to calls for Balochistan's secession, met by Bhutto's ordering the Pakistan Army into the province. Akbar Khan Bugti served as provincial governor during the early stages of the conflict. The operation itself was led by General Tikka Khan against an unknown number of militants coordinated by their Baloch sardars, or tribal chiefs, most notably Khair Bakhsh Marri and Ataullah Mengal. Iran provided military support to the operation.

Fighting was intermittent throughout the conflict, climaxing in 1974 with drawn-out battles. The Bhutto regime was overthrown by General Zia-ul-Haq on 5 July 1977, and martial law was imposed. A general amnesty was declared by military governor Rahimuddin Khan. Military action ended by November 1977, replaced by development and educational policies to conciliate the province.

== Calls for independence ==
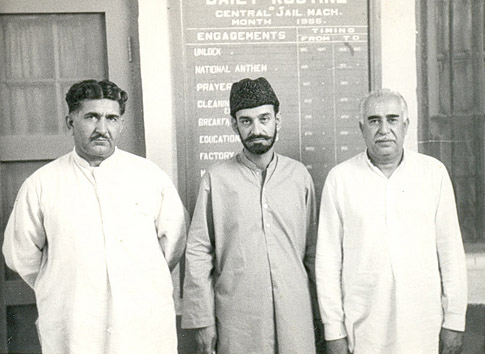
Mir Gul Khan Nasir (left), Ataullah Mengal and Mir Ghaus Bakhsh Bizenjo in Mach jail

The 1971 civil war had ended with the defeat of Pakistan. East Pakistan declared itself to be independent. It became a new sovereign state called Bangladesh, to be ruled by Bengali leader Sheikh Mujibur Rahman. Mujib had been a major personality in the events that had led to the war, having called for greater provincial autonomy and rights for what was then East Pakistan, only to be met with utter disapproval by the then military ruler Yahya Khan and his West Pakistan-based political opponent Zulfikar Ali Bhutto. Despite Mujib's having won the federal elections of 1970, both Yahya and Bhutto refused to let Mujib form the central government. The ensuing unrest gradually deteriorated into civil war, and ultimately the secession of Bangladesh after the India-Pakistan War of 1971. India also played a large part in the independence of Bangladesh by arming and financing the separatist group Mukti Bahini which rebelled against the Pakistani State after the injustice done to the then East Pakistan. Most importantly, India sent its troops into East Pakistan to aid the Bengali separatists in suppressing the Pakistan army.

This greatly influenced Balochistan's leading political party, the National Awami Party (NAP). Led by ethnic nationalists and feudal leaders such as Sardar Ataullah Mengal and Khan Wali Khan, the party dominated the province due to the large amount of individual political influence its leaders held. Emboldened by the secession of Bangladesh, the party demanded greater autonomy from Zulfikar Ali Bhutto, who had become the new President of Pakistan following his predecessor Yahya Khan's resignation in December 1971, in return for a consensual agreement on Bhutto's Pakistan Constitution of 1973. Bhutto, however, refused to negotiate on any terms that might have involved a reduction in his powers, with chief minister Ataullah Mengal in Quetta and Mufti Mahmud in Peshawar. The already significant civil unrest now turned volatile as tensions between the NAP and Bhutto erupted.

== Launch of Bhutto's military operation ==
The ethno-separatist rebellion of Balochistan of the 1970s, the most threatening civil disorder to Pakistan since Bangladesh's secession, now began. Surveying the political instability, Bhutto's central government sacked two provincial governments within six months, arrested the two chief ministers, two governors, forty-four Members of the National Assembly and Provincial Assembly, obtained an order from the Supreme Court banning the NAP, and charged everyone with high treason to be tried by a specially constituted Hyderabad Tribunal of handpicked judges. Following the alleged discovery of Iraqi arms in Islamabad in February 1973, Bhutto dissolved the Balochistan Provincial Assembly and infuriated Balochistan's political oligarchs.

In time, the nationalist insurgency, which had been steadily gathering steam, now exploded into action, with widespread civil disobedience and armed uprisings. Bhutto now sent in the army to maintain order and crush the insurgency. This essentially pitted the ethno-separatists against the central government. As casualties rose, the insurgency became a full-fledged armed struggle against the Pakistan Army. The sporadic fighting between the insurgency and the army started in 1973 with the largest confrontation taking place in September 1974 when around 15,000 ethno-separatists fought the Pakistan Army and Air Force. The army suffered more than 3,000 casualties in the fight while the militants lost some 5,000 fighters as of 1977. After four years of fighting, the separatists began running out of ammunition and withdrew by 1977.

== Foreign support ==
=== India ===
Pakistan asserted India was covertly intervening in Balochistan in the same way it had intervened in East Pakistan before the secession of Bangladesh. India denied the assertions, replying that it was fearful of further balkanisation of the subcontinent after Bangladesh. In retrospect, Avinash Paliwal, in his book My Enemy's Enemy: India in Afghanistan from the Soviet Invasion to the US Withdrawal, cites a junior Indian intelligence officer participant in these operations who recalled that "we gave Baloch everything, from money to guns, during the 1970s, everything". Paliwal further claims that just as Pakistan and India were bitter rivals, so were Iran and Iraq. In the pursuit of their respective rivalries, Pakistan and Iran developed closer relations, as did India and Iraq. Arming Baloch insurgents in Iran and Pakistan was in the interest of both Iraq and India. The militant group Pasthun Zalmay was responsible for a series of bomb blasts and other insurgent activities in Pakistan; it comprised Balochs and Pashtuns and was in direct contact with Kabul as well as with the Indian and Iraqi missions in Afghanistan. As a consequence, relations between Iran and India deteriorated so much that in 1975, Indian diplomat Ram D. Sathe sent a secret letter to the Indian ambassador in Tehran in which Sathe predicted that "it will be a few more days before the Iranians will stridently back the Pakistanis (on Kashmir) ... Personally I do not think we should be under any illusion about this matter. I think Iranians will definitely back the Pakistanis".

=== Iran ===
It was after visiting Iran in 1973 that President Zulfikar Ali Bhutto had dissolved Balochistan's provincial government in the run-up to the operation. When the operation was begun, Mohammed Reza Pahlavi, the Shah of Iran and an ally of Bhutto, feared a spread of Baloch ethnic resistance into Iran. The Imperial Iranian Army began providing Pakistan with military hardware and financial support. Among Iran's contributions were 30 HueyCobra attack helicopters and $200 million in aid.

=== United States ===
During the conflict, US provided training and military equipment to Pakistan, most notable is the Marine training program to train the Pakistan Army soldiersagainst Baloch separatists. Moreover, many military officers were trained in US as well as many in Pakistan by American forces in this conflict. In 1974, an embargo was imposed on Pakistan due to its weapon of mass destruction projects, but due to intensification of the insurgency, it was lifted in 1975 and weapons were sent to Pakistan to deal with the situation.

=== Republic of Afghanistan ===
The Republic of Afghanistan, under the leadership of General Mohammed Daoud Khan, provided covert support to Pashtun and Baloch militants. Daoud Khan had ordered the construction of military training camps for Pashtun and Baloch militants in Kabul and in Kandahar. Camps in Kabul were under the supervision and control of the Afghan Republican Guard. Pashtun and Baloch militants were provided with arms, ammunition, and training in insurgent warfare so that they would fight against Pakistan.

=== Iraq ===
Relations between Baloch separatists and Ba'athist Iraq had historical roots and were strong up until the 2003 U.S-led invasion of Iraq. Following the Indo-Pakistani War of 1971, Iraq had begun to collaborate with the Soviet Union in launching a covert operation to provide military aid to Baloch insurgents operating in Pakistan and Iran. The aim of this operation was to destabilize the two countries by helping dissident Baloch rebels in their fight against the Iranian and Pakistani states that were close allies with the United States. The operation remained modestly successful during the early 1970s, but ultimately failed when there was unrest amongst the Baloch nationalist leaders involved in the insurgency due to internal disputes. This disorder accompanied by an extremely tough crackdown by the Pakistan Army (supported by Iran) in its Balochistan province crippled the joint Iraqi-Soviet attempts to destabilize the two key U.S. allies in the region and pave the way for Iraq's dominance over Iran as well as more favourable circumstances for India against Pakistan, with the goal of the region completely falling under the Soviet sphere of influence. The disputes took place when Baloch politicians Ghaus Bakhsh Bizenjo and Ataullah Mengal of the National Awami Party refused to accept the demands of Akbar Bugti to establish himself as the Governor of Pakistani Balochistan.

=== Oman ===
During the Dhofar war, Baloch militants (including BSO) started supporting the Dhofari rebels. In a shootout in Balochistan, a Dhofari recruiter from Oman, who came to recruit Balochi mercenaries, was seriously wounded. This incident prompted Oman to provide financial support to Pakistan against insurgents. Moreover, Pakistani troops were also trained in Oman to fight against Baloch separatists.

=== Soviet Union ===
Due to communist ideology of the insurgents and in an attempt to destabilize Pakistan, a western aligned nation, the Soviet Union had started supporting groups like Balochistan Liberation Front, enabling them to regroup. They also provided financial assistance and training to the separatists. American defence aid to Pakistan also promoted further Soviet support to the separatists to gain a stronghold in the region in the form of an independent Marxist Balochistan. Moreover, a Marxist state in the region could break the Green belt isolating Pakistan and breaking direct connection with western aligned states.

== End of action ==
Although major fighting had broken down, ideological schisms caused splinter groups to form and steadily gain momentum. On 5 July 1977, the Bhutto government was overthrown by General Zia-ul-Haq and martial law was imposed. With the civil disobedience in Balochistan remaining widespread, the military brought in Lieutenant General Rahimuddin Khan as governor under martial law. Rahimuddin declared a general amnesty for belligerents willing to give up arms and oversaw military withdrawal. Ataullah Mengal, Khair Bakhsh Marri, and Sardars that had been involved in the conflict, were isolated by Rahimuddin from provincial affairs, and left the province for foreign countries. Marri later said the Baloch independence movement was 'at a virtual standstill', and Marri tribesmen, who had laid down their arms, were granted amnesty. Akbar Bugti, having sided with Tikka Khan and now being sidelined by Rahimuddin Khan, went into self-imposed seclusion. The civil disobedience movements and anti-government protests later died down.

Rahimuddin's tenure also ushered in sustained development. Following the Soviet invasion of neighbouring Afghanistan in 1979, Rahimuddin used the resultant foreign attention on Balochistan by introducing an externally financed development programme for the area. $40 million (USD) were committed to the programme by the end of 1987, by which time Rahimuddin had resigned. He expedited the regulation of Pakistan Petroleum Limited, the exploration company charged with the Sui gas field. He consolidated the then-contentious integration of Gwadar into Balochistan, which had earlier been notified as a district in 1977. Addressing the province's literacy rate, the lowest in the country for both males and females, he administered the freeing up of resources towards education, created girls' incentive programs, and had several girls' schools built in the Dera Bugti District. As part of his infrastructure schemes, he also forced his way in extending electricity to vast areas with subsoil water.

== See also ==
- First Kalat Rebellion
- Second Kalat Rebellion
- 1960s insurgency in Balochistan
- Insurgency in Balochistan
- Operation Radd-ul-Fasaad
- List of conflicts related to the Cold War

== Sources ==
- Siddique, Abubakar (2014). The Pashtun Question The Unresolved Key to the Future of Pakistan and Afghanistan (Hardcover). Hurst. ISBN 9781849042925.
