= Mohabat Khan Marri =

Pakistani politician

Senator Mir Mohabat Khan Marri
- In office March 2006 – March 2012
- President: Asif Zardari

Personal details
- Party: Pakistan Muslim League (PML)
- Occupation: Politician

Mir Mohabat Khan Marri is a Pakistani politician and a former Member of the Senate of Pakistan. He is also the head of Bijarani Marri tribe.

== Political career ==
He belongs to Balochistan province and is the head of bijarani subtribe and a leader of the Marri tribe, and was elected to the Senate of Pakistan on general seat as Pakistan Muslim League (PML) candidate. His tenure began in March 2006, and ended in March 2012. As a Senator he has served in Standing Committee on Petroleum and Natural Resources, Standing Committee on Food, Agriculture and Livestock and as a Chairman of Standing Committee on Local Government and Rural Development. He was a Provincial Minister for Revenue, Religious, Excise and Minorities Affairs during 1999-2002 Balochistan Assembly Cabinet.

== See also ==
- List of Senators of Pakistan
- Kalsoom Perveen
- Abdul Rahim Khan Mandokhel
