= United Baloch Army =

Militant organization

- یونائیٹڈ بلوچ آرمی
- Leaders: Mehran Marri; Abdul Nabi Bangulzai †; Wali Mohammad alias Haji Wali Kalati (surrendered)
- Dates active: 2013–
- Dissolved: 2022 (Sarfraz Bangulzai faction only)
- Split from: Baloch Liberation Army (BLA)
- Merged into: Baloch Nationalist Army
- Active regions: Balochistan, Pakistan
- Ideology: Baloch Nationalism
- Wars: Insurgency in Balochistan

United Baloch Army (UBA; یونائیٹڈ بلوچ آرمی) is a militant group, fighting for the separation of Balochistan from Pakistan. The group was designated as a terrorist organization by the Pakistani and Swiss governments. The government of Pakistan banned the group on 15 March 2013.

The group is led by Mehran Marri and is created as a result of an inter-familial dispute between Mehran and his brother Hyrbyair Marri, the head of the Balochistan Liberation Army (BLA). BLA fighters accused Mehran of stealing $3 million from their funds and $800 million rupees worth of weapons from the BLA. The BLA and the Baloch Republican Army have both condemned UBA attacks as self-destructive. Both Baloch Liberation Army (BLA) and United Baloch Army (UBA) had also clashed with each other. The deadliest clash took place in Dera Bugti where 20 militants from both groups were killed.

On 29 May 2015, United Baloch Army (UBA) militants stormed two buses in Mastung district that were in transit from Pishin to Karachi. The militants emptied the buses and then shot and killed 22 ethnic Pashtuns.

United Baloch Army (UBA) also claimed responsibility for attack on the Jaffar Express in Sibi on 8 April 2014. The attack claimed the lives of 16 people and wounded 44 others.

On 16 November 2017, Mehran Marri was arrested at Zurich Airport by Swiss immigration authorities. Mehran Marri was placed under a lifetime ban from entry into Switzerland. Swiss authorities issued a chargesheet in which they stated that Mehran Marri is the head of United Baloch Army (UBA). The chargesheet further stated that "if Marri was to enter Switzerland and work with Brahamdagh Bugti to coordinate terrorist operations, it could jeopardize the internal security of the country".

In october 2021, the militant group split into two factions, one led by Sarfraz Bangulzai and the other by Mehran Marri.

In January 2022, the Gulzar Iman group of Baloch Republican Army merged with the Sarfraz Bangulzai faction of UBA, to form the Baloch Nationalist Army (BNA). BRA and UBA also announced their dissolution following the establishment of Baloch Nationalist Army.

In May 2025, Mazar Baloch, spokesman of Mehran Marri faction of UBA claimed responsibility for burning a mobile tower machinery in Surab.

In August 2026, Mehran Marri faction of UBA claimed responsibility for several attacks against bridges and pakistani soldiers.
