= Baloch Students Organization =

Student society

Baloch Students Organization Tanzém dánsh ámózán Balóch
- Logo of the BSO
- Abbreviation: BSO
- Founded: 26 November 1967 (58 years ago)
- Founded at: Karachi
- Type: Students union
- Location: Pakistan
- Official language: Balochi, Urdu, Brahui

The Baloch Students Organization (BSO; Urdu: بلوچ اسٹوڈنٹس آرگنائزیشن; Balochi: بلۏچی نۏدربرانءِ اورگان) was a student organisation that campaigned for the students of Pakistan's Balochistan province. It was founded as a student movement on 26 November 1967 in Karachi and had remained the largest ethnic Baloch student body in the country. It was divided due to ideological differences. BSO – Pajjar and BSO – Mohiuddin are affiliated with the parliamentary framework of Pakistan.

However, in 2000, a college student named Allah Nazar Baloch, who would later go on to found and lead the Balochistan Liberation Front (BLF) militant group, created a radical breakaway faction—BSO – Azad—that advocated struggle for an independent Balochistan based on what he characterised as a pre-colonial Baloch "country". Notably, Bashir Zaib also rose through the ranks of BSO – Azad and served as its chairman for years before becoming the current leader of the Balochistan Liberation Army (BLA) militant group. The Pakistani government eventually banned the BSO – Azad on 15 March 2013, designating it as a terrorist organisation.

There was an alleged link between the BSO and India, with Pakistan accusing the Indian intelligence agency— the Research & Analysis Wing (R&AW) of having "assets" within the BSO, an allegation that was denied by India and activists in the BSO.

The Baloch Students Organization (BSO) has its origins in Warna Waninda Gal ("Youth Educational Forum") launched in 1961, three years after the Pakistan Army arrested the Khan of Kalat giving rise to Baloch nationalism. Abdul Hakeem Baloch was its first president. The stated objectives of the organization included "promoting Balochi language and literature and debating political conditions".

Another organization called the Baloch Students Educational Organization (BSEO) was founded by Baloch students in Karachi in 1962.

On 26 November 1967, after a three-day convention in Karachi, the two organizations merged into one forming the Baloch Students Organization (BSO). Nadeem F. Paracha, a senior columnist at Dawn, characterises it as a "left wing" organisation. In addition to the original aims of Warna Waninda Gal, the BSO also aimed to campaign for the abolition of the "one unit scheme" system and limited provincial autonomy for Balochistan. The group initially campaigned for improved educational facilities in Balochistan. Its demonstrations led to many arrests and the closure of student hostels. By 1969–1970, the BSO was sweeping student union elections in the Baloch majority areas of Balochistan and it was allied with the National Students Federation (NSF) in Karachi's universities and colleges.

== History ==
=== Rise of nationalism: 1970–1977 ===
Soon the organization got involved in the growing Baloch national movement, protesting against Ayub Khan's policies of political restriction and functional inequality which gave rise to widespread antagonism in the Baloch population. Spearheading the movement were the tribal elites, professional classes such as lawyers and doctors, and students. The student movement was supported by the "progressive" tribal leaders, Ataullah Mengal, Khair Bakhsh Marri, and Ghous Bakhsh Bizenjo, who were also leading members of the National Awami Party (NAP). The NAP consulted the BSO on all major issues. In early 1969, the organization conducted many demonstrations in Quetta, protesting the one unit scheme system and the tribal jirga system. They called for the release of political prisoners. Several leaders later went on to become guerrilla leaders during the 1970s. BSO leader Abdul Hayee Baloch contested the 1970 elections and got elected to the Pakistan National Assembly, as a member of the NAP.

Whereas the mainstream organization collaborated with the progressive tribal leaders, a faction was opposed to all forms of tribal privileges of the Sardars. They broke off into a separate splinter group Baloch Students Organization – Awami, and allied themselves to Zulfikar Ali Bhutto's Pakistan Peoples Party (PPP).

During the Bangladesh Liberation War in 1971, Bhutto formed a tripartite alliance with the NAP and Jamiat Ulema-e-Islam (JUI). The NAP and the BSO, being supporters of provincial autonomy, called for the release of Sheikh Mujibur "Bangabandhu" Rahman and the restoration of democracy, which earned the ire of the military government in Islamabad. After Bhutto came to power at the end of the war, he let the NAP-JUI coalition form a provincial government in Balochistan in April 1972. This was the first time that a "national" government was allowed to function in Balochistan. However, Bhutto dismissed it ten months later on what are seen as "trumped up" charges. Among the long list of reasons cited for the dismissal was the allegation that the government was allowing the "lawless behaviour" of the BSO. The dismissal was followed by the arrest of NAP leaders and the unleashing of military on the province.

The Bhutto government actions set off a four-year insurgency (1973–1977) in Balochistan. Many of the former BSO members participated in the guerrilla warfare against the state. One of the guerrilla bands was led by the former BSO leader Khair Jan Baloch. BSO activists in schools supplied guerrillas with money and materiel. The more militant members joined the Balochistan Liberation Front (BLF). After four years of bloodshed, the insurgency came to end when Zia-ul-Haq came to power and declared a general amnesty. However, no meaningful change towards provincial autonomy occurred.

=== Fragmentation and reunification: 1977–2006 ===
After his release from prison Ataullah Mengal went into exile and the remainder of the NAP split into several factions. The armed struggle against the Pakistani state was called off, leading the BSO to turn against the NAP. In 1978, it even dismissed its chairman Mueem Kahan Baloch on the grounds that he supported the NAP.

The BSO remained the leading student organisation in Balochistan's campuses, protesting against Zia-ul-Haq's dictatorship. It also denounced the Islamist Afghan resistance against the Soviet troops backed by the United States and Saudi Arabia. In 1981, it joined the United Students Movement, an alliance of left-wing ethno-nationalist student groups opposing the Zia regime and the Islami Jamiat-e-Talaba. Large numbers of BSO activists were imprisoned during this period, said to be 60% of all prisoners in Balochistan.

In 1984, the BSO – Awami merged back into the main BSO, following the request of Hameed Baloch, who was given death sentence for an attempted assassination of an Omani colonel. However, fragmentation of the Baloch political parties gave rise to parallel fragmentation in the BSO as well. Some of the groups arising through the fragmentation were:

| Name | Information |
|---|---|
| BSO – Sohb | Led by Kahwar Baloch (1986–1990), allied to Progressive Youth Movement (PYM). |
| BSO – Yaseen | Led by Yaseen Baloch (1988–1990), allied to Balochistan National Movement (BNM). |
| BSO – Mengal | (1990–1998), allied to BNM–Mengal and Balochistan National Party (BNP). |
| BSO – Hayee | (1990–2002), allied to BNM–Hayee. |
| BSO – Aman | (1998–2006), allied to BNP–Mengal. |
| BSO – Star | (1998–2003). |
| BSO – Nadir Quddus | (2002–2006), allied to the National Party (NP). |
| BSO – Azad | Led by Allah Nazar Baloch (2002–2003). |
| BSO – Muttahida | Formed by a merger of BSO – Azad and BSO – Star, led by Imdad Baloch (2003–2006). |

In February 2006, noticing the fragmentation arising from political party affiliations, all the factions came together and united into a single organization. The resulting BSO eventually came to be called BSO – Azad ("free BSO"), signifying that it is not affiliated to any political party. However, the organization does support Khair Bakhsh Marri, the Baloch Liberation Army (BLA), and the armed struggle of Brahumdagh Bugti.

The National Party (NP) and Balochistan National Party (BNP) then started their own student wings and gave them the name of the BSO. They are referred to as BSO – Pajjar and BSO – Mohiuddin respectively.

BSO – Azad is now considered the most influential political group in Balochistan.

=== BSO – Azad ===
BSO – Azad was originally formed in 2002 from the members of BSO – Hayee who wanted to remain independent of political parties. According to some commentators, it advocated armed struggle for an independent Balochistan. Allah Nazar Baloch, who later became a separatist fighter, was its founder-chairman when he was still a medical student.

In 2003, BSO – Star, which was similarly made up of members seeking independence from political parties in BSO – Mengal, merged with BSO – Azad, and the combined organization was called BSO – Muttahida (or "BSO – United"). More often, it was simply called "the BSO", recognizing its claim to be the main students organization. Malik Baloch and Imdad Baloch served as its chairmen until 2005. In March 2005, Imdad Baloch, and other activists were abducted from a flat in Karachi by security forces and tortured.

In December 2005, the Balochistan conflict intensified with the Army starting operations in Dera Bugti district and Kohlu. Following this, the BSO – Aman (the affiliated faction of BSO – Mengal) led by Amanullah Baloch and BSO – Hayee led by Asif Baloch also merged with BSO – Muttihada forming a united BSO. Bashir Zaib Baloch served its chairman from 2006 to 2011. He was followed by Zahid Baloch, who was allegedly abducted by unidentified gunmen in March 2014.

The Balochistan National Party (BNP) and the National Party (NP), having lost their affiliated factions to the unified BSO, started new student wings and gave them the name of "BSO". The student wing of National Party (NP) is called BSO – Pajjar and that of the Balochistan National Party (BNP) is called BSO – Mohiuddin. The unified BSO now calls itself BSO – Azad to distinguish itself from these student wings. However, it is not to be confused with the original BSO – Azad started by Allah Nazar Baloch.

The original BSO – Azad is said to have been formed from the "most militant sections" of the BSO. It advocated radical struggle for "national liberation" and stood for full independence of Balochistan. After its consolidation by Allah Nazar Baloch in 2002, when he was a medical student, the group is said to have obtained wide support among the Baloch students. It was believed that groups like the Balochistan Liberation Army (BLA) and Balochistan Liberation Front (BLF) grew out of BSO – Azad. Senior columnist of Dawn, Nadeem F. Paracha, states that it was directly involved in the formation of insurgency groups such as the Balochistan Liberation Army (BLA) and Baloch Republican Army (BRA).

The Pakistani state is said to view the organization with such concern as to ban it in 2013, a month before the elections. The Asian Human Rights Commission (AHRC) condemned the ban and severely castigated the Pakistan government. It said that: "in an effort to show the international community that it is taking action against the fundamentalist and religious terrorist organizations", the government has banned three secular and nationalist organizations instead, while it showed: "continued loyalties towards the Taliban and similar terrorist groups".

Its leader was Zahid Baloch until in March 2014 he was abducted in Quetta in March 2014 in front of eyewitnesses by men who arrived in SUVs used by the Pakistani Army. Zahid was made to squat on the road and hit on the head several times, after which he was blindfolded and taken away. The police have refused to register a complaint, and his whereabouts are unknown.

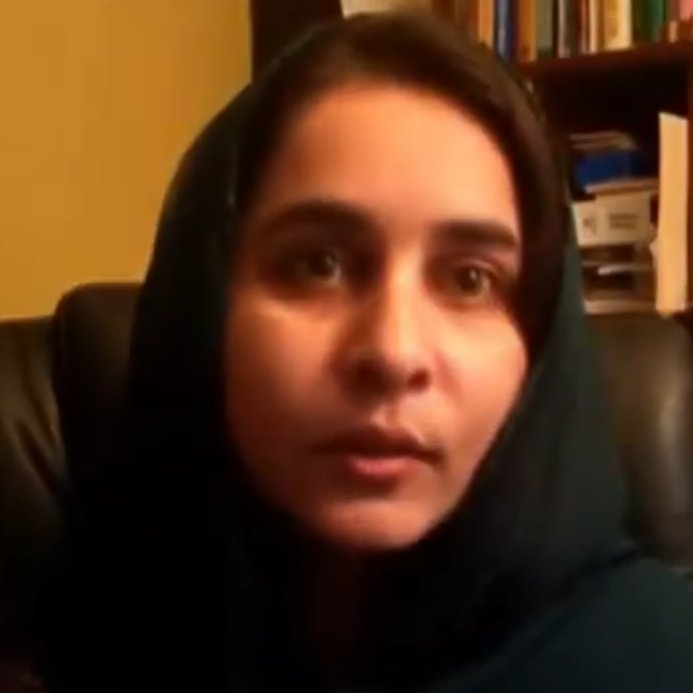
Karima Baloch in a video message to the Indian Prime Minister

29 year-old Karima Baloch, a psychology student, then became the leader. Karima insisted that the organization uses peaceful means by carrying out demonstrations and marches, and that it aims to raise the political awareness of the people. However, she also added that any struggle against injustice is legitimate, whether "peaceful or armed". Malik Siraj Akbar, a Harvard-based political analyst, calls it a "very unique organization that does not have any parallels in Pakistan". It is one of the very few organizations that have managed to mobilize women at a social and political level. In 2016 Karima was chosen as one of the BBC's 100 Women.

Allah Nazar Baloch, the one-time founder of the organization is now the commander of the Balochistan Liberation Front (BLF), which wages an ethno-nationalist armed struggle for the state's liberation.

The organisation has been protesting his abduction ever since. The organisation also called for a nationwide strike in April 2014, which was supported by all Baloch nationalist parties. Many towns in Balochistan observed a shut down. Activist Latif Johar went on a hunger strike, which he called off after 46 days at the behest of human rights activist Mir Mohammad Ali Talpur. The organization has also approached the UN High Commissioner for Human Rights asking him to intervene with the Pakistan government and secure the release of Zahid Baloch. According to Al Jazeera, Zahid's abduction is only the latest among a long list of abductions of BSO – Azad's leadership, which represent the Pakistani state's attempt to suppress the independence movement. Most that are abducted remain missing, others are tortured and killed before the corpses are dumped in the country.

In November 2015, Karima Baloch went to Canada as a refugee. She said that she escaped a Pakistani military attack on the town of Tump and stayed underground for nearly a year before arriving in Toronto. It was reported that she intended to apply for refugee status in Canada. Karima attended Amnesty International's "Rights for Rights" event to raise awareness of the world community on the abductions and disappearances in Balochistan. Karima Baloch was last seen alive on 20 December 2020. On 22 December 2020, the 37-year-old activist was found dead in Toronto.

=== BSO – Pajjar ===
Javid Baloch is the former chairman of BSO – Pajjar, had the largest following among the Baloch students. It represented a mainstream viewpoint and concentrated on ideological and educational aspects of Baloch national movement. It attempted to get as many Baloch youth educated as possible and holds regular "study circles" in which it imparted education in the history and ideology of Baloch nationalist movement. Its main objectives were advancing the rights of the Baloch people and the termination of military operations. This group had affiliated itself with the National Party (NP), the ruling party in Balochistan. The National Party wanted more provincial rights and greater autonomy for Baluchistan province within the parliamentary framework of Pakistan.

=== BSO – Mengal ===
BSO – Mengal, led by Mohden Baloch, was formed in the early 2000s. Though it subscribes to the radical nationalist ideology of Balochistan's secession from Pakistan, it has affiliated itself with the mainstream Balochistan National Party (Mengal) (BNP–M), which is the largest opposition party in the Provincial Assembly of Balochistan. The group has gathered enough support from the student body since its split from the united BSO and demands "total autonomy" for Balochistan. It promoted the rights of Baloch Students Balochistan within the parliamentary framework of Pakistan.

=== BSO – Awami ===
The Baloch Students Organization – Awami was founded in 1972, when it split from the Baloch Students Organization (BSO). It supported Baluch People's Liberation Front (BPLF), a militant organization in Balochistan against Pakistani control. The organization was Marxist–Leninist in its ideology and was against the Sardari system in Balochistan.

== Controversies ==
=== Kulbhushan Jadhav ===
In 2016 an Indian national—named Kulbhushan Jadhav—was arrested by Pakistani security forces, who claimed that he was an officer on active duty in the Indian Navy with the rank of commander and a spy working for Indian intelligence agencies. They charged him with espionage and released a pre-recorded statement of Jadhav confessing to being a spy working for the Indian intelligence agency Research & Analysis Wing (R&AW) and admitting that he had been in touch with its contacts in Pakistan, especially those in the BSO. He also stated that he was to support the insurgency by coordinating subversion, violent activities against the general population, targeting attacks against strategic assets in the region, and against Chinese workers. The Indian government has denied that Jadhav was an intelligence operative and said the video statement was "tutored".

Karima Baloch denied that the BSO had any contacts with the Indian intelligence agency. She stated that theirs was a home-grown movement for the independence of Balochistan and that Pakistan wished to paint it as a proxy war of foreign powers.

=== Talat Aziz ===
In a notable development, Talat Aziz, a student from Punjab University (PU) who recently surrendered after being associated with the banned Balochistan Liberation Army (BLA), disclosed the group’s recruitment methods. He stated that interactions with certain Baloch students led to his radicalisation and eventual decision to join the BLA under the illusion of fighting for Balochistan’s independence. Aziz warned others against being misled by narratives around missing persons and false promises of freedom, and accused Baloch student councils of playing a key role in spreading extremist ideology. He alleged that the BLA targets youth by inciting ethnic hatred and manipulating protests organized by groups like the Baloch Solidarity Committee.

Aziz also claimed to have recognized a young militant from protest materials, highlighting how such events are used to recruit members.

== See also ==
- 1970s operation in Balochistan
- Politics of Pakistan
- Insurgency in Balochistan

== Bibliography ==
- Ali, Imtiaz (April 2005), "The Balochistan Problem", Pakistan Horizon, 58 (2): 41–62, JSTOR 41394092
- Maxwell, Alexander (2014), The Comparative Approach to National Movements: Miroslav Hroch and Nationalism Studies, Routledge, ISBN 978-1-317-97916-6
- Muhammad, Sh. B. (2014), "Dynamics of the Nationalist Insurgency in the Balochistan Province of Pakistan", Pathways to Peace and Security, 1 (46), Institute of world Economy and International Relations: 50–74
- Samad, Yunas (2014), "Understanding the insurgency in Balochistan", Commonwealth & Comparative Politics, 52 (2): 293–320, doi:10.1080/14662043.2014.894280, S2CID 144156399
- Titus, Paul; Swidler, Nina (2000), "Knights, not Pawns: Ethno-Nationalism and Regional Dynamics in Post-Colonial Balochistan", International Journal of Middle East Studies, 32 (1): 47–69, doi:10.1017/S0020743800021048, JSTOR 259535, S2CID 144179133
