= Mehran Marri =

British-Pakistani Baloch separatist

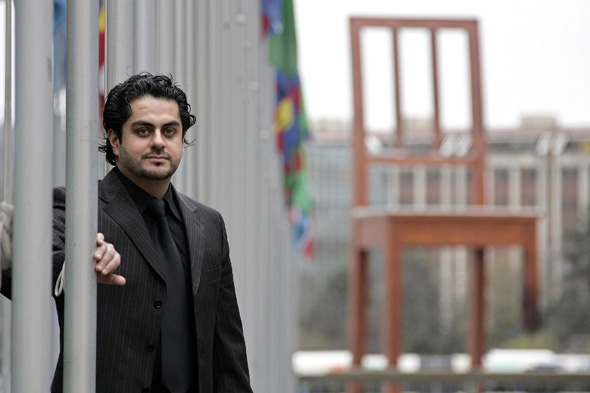
- Born: March 24, 1972 (age 54); Quetta, Pakistan
- Years active: 2000s–present
- Father: Khair Bakhsh Marri
- Relatives: Changez Marri (brother); Balach Marri (brother); Ghazan Marri (brother); Hyrbyair Marri (brother); Hamza Marri (brother); Brahamdagh Bugti (brother-in-law)

Mehran Marri (Urdu: مهران مری; born March 24, 1972) is a British-Pakistani Baloch militant sepratist, who served as the head of United Baloch Army (UBA), a militant group which was designated as a terrorist organization by Pakistan and Switzerland until its dissolution in 2022. Mehran was born in Quetta, Balochistan province, Pakistan.

On 16 November 2017, Mehran Marri was arrested at Zurich Airport by Swiss authorities. Shortly after his arrest, Mehran Marri was placed under lifetime ban on entry to Switzerland. Swiss authorities issued a chargesheet in which they stated that Mehran Marri was the head of United Baloch Army (UBA). The chargesheet further stated that "if Marri was to enter Switzerland and work with Brahumdagh Bugti to coordinate terrorist operations, it could jeopardize the internal security of Switzerland".

However, after some time, Marri was released and deported by the Swiss authorities from Switzerland. Marri currently resides in United Kingdom. Marri's brother, Balach Marri, was the head of Baloch Liberation Army (BLA), a Baloch militant organisation, until his death in a NATO airstrike in 2007 in Afghanistan. After Balach Marri's death, Hyrbyair Marri took control of the BLA.

His father spent five years in Hyderabad Jail. He along with his brother Hyrbyair live in England, while their brother Changez is chief of the Marri tribe and a politician in Pakistan.

== Split from BLA ==
In 2012, the United Baloch Army (UBA) broke away from the Baloch Liberation Army (BLA). According to them, this was due to financial fraud between Hyrbyair Marri and his brother Mehran Marri, related to the BLA's funding.

== See also ==
- Balochistan
- Changez Marri
- Balach Marri
- Ghazan Marri
- Hyrbyair Marri
- Hamza Marri
- Brahamdagh Bugti
