= Khair Bakhsh Marri =

Politician

Khair Baksh Marri
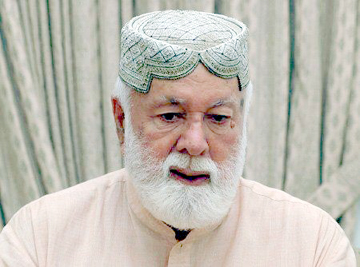
- Born: Khair Baksh Marri; 28 February 1928; Kahan, Baluchistan, British India
- Died: 10 June 2014 (aged 86); Karachi, Pakistan
- Occupations: Nawab, Politician
- Years active: 1960s–2014
- Children: Changez Marri; Balach Marri; Ghazan Marri; Hyrbyair Marri; Mehran Marri; Hamza Marri

Khair Bakhsh Marri (28 February 1928 – 10 June 2014; Balochi: خیر بخش مری) was a Pakistani politician from the province of Balochistan in Pakistan. Marri was also head of the Marri tribe.

== Early life and career ==
Marri had received his early education in Kohlu, Balochistan and higher education from Aitchison College, Lahore. Marri admitted himself in a 2008 interview that he was a 'latecomer' into politics due to the comfortable life he spent at Aitchison College, Lahore and that he was indifferent to politics in his youth. Only when oil and gas exploration started in the Marri tribal areas during General Ayub Khan's regime in Pakistan, his tribal nationalist feelings and political consciousness were aroused.

Government of Pakistan's longstanding view was that these Baloch tribal chiefs are 'anti-development' in their tribal areas and want to cling onto their own traditionally-held power over their people. The tribal chiefs do not want their people to get modern education due to their fear that then the Balochi people would rebel against their own tribal chiefs.

Marri became a member of the National Assembly of Pakistan, after winning a seat from Balochistan in the Pakistani general election, 1970.

He also was a key leader of the 1970s insurgency against the Pakistani government. Due to the steps taken by the federal government to suppress the rebellion by Zulfiqar Ali Bhutto regime in the 1970s, Marri spent many years in exile in Afghanistan, and only returned to Pakistan when the USSR-backed government of Mohammad Najibullah supporting him in that country, had fallen in the early 1990s.

After returning to Pakistan from his exile, he decided to keep a low profile, but his Baloch nationalist views earned him a label of a 'communist nationalist'.

== Death and legacy ==
Marri died on 10 June 2014 in Karachi,at age 86. He was admitted to Liaquat National Hospital, Karachi in a critical condition on 6 June 2014 and had been under treatment there.

He had six sons, including Balach Marri, Changez Marri, Hyrbyair Marri, Ghazan Marri and Mehran Marri.

== See also ==
- Ataullah Mengal
- Balochistan
- Brahamdagh Bugti
- Ghaus Bakhsh Bizenjo
- Mir Gul Khan Naseer
- Nazir Ahmed Marri
