= Baloch Republican Army =

Militant organization

- بلوچ ریپبلکن آرمی
- Leader: Brahumdagh Bugti
- Spokesperson: Sarbaz Baloch
- Dates active: 2006–Now
- Merged into: Baloch Nationalist Army
- Country: Pakistan
- Active regions: Balochistan, Pakistan; Kandahar, Afghanistan
- Ideology: Baloch nationalism Separatism; Ethnonationalism
- Status: Active
- Size: Unknown
- Part of: Baloch Nationalist Army (2022-2023)
- Wars: Insurgency in Balochistan

The Baloch Republican Army (BRA) (Balochi: بلوچ ریپبلکن آرمی) is an armed militant group in Balochistan, Pakistan. In September 2010, the Government of Pakistan banned the Baloch Republican Army.

Brahumdagh Bugti is the head of BRA. In 2017 Bugti's asylum request was rejected by Swiss authorities. The Swiss authorities said that Bugti's asylum request was rejected because he was involved in terror-related activities.

In January 2022, Beebarg faction of Baloch Republican Army merged with Mureed group of United Baloch Army, to form Baloch Nationalist Army (BNA). BRA and UBA also announced their dissolution following the establishment of Baloch Nationalist Army.

== History ==
The Baloch Republican Army was formed in Dera Bugti, after the death of renowned Baloch leader, Nawab Akbar Bugti in 2006. In the beginning, the group was mostly joined by Bugti tribesmen but later years it gained popularity among Baloch students and in urban areas of Balochistan to fight against the Pakistani state. It was led by Brahumdagh Bugti.

In 2017, Bugti's asylum request was rejected by the Swiss government on the basis of Bugti's links with “incidents of terrorism, violence and militant activities". The same year also saw surrender of 143 militants belonging to Baloch Republican Army to the Pakistani authorities.

In October 2018, Gulzar Imam (alias Beebarg) was expelled from the BRA and created his own faction.

In 2018, another group of 70 militants belonging to Baloch Republican Army and their commander surrendered to Pakistani authorities.

In 2019, the Gulzar Imam faction of the Baloch Republican Army joined Baloch Raaji Aajoi Sangar.

In 2021, BRA claimed responsibility for destroying a statue of Pakistan's founding father, Muhammad Ali Jinnah in Balochistan.

In January 2022, the Beebarg faction of Baloch Republican Army (BRA) and the Mureed faction of United Baloch Army (UBA) announced their dissolution and the formation of a new organization the Baloch Nationalist Army (BNA). The faction led by Sarbaz Baloch had continued to exist.

In June 2025, BRA, led by Sarbaz Baloch, claimed responsibility for killing of two police men in Dera Bugti. In September 2025, an armed tribal group killed an important commander of BRA-Sarbaz faction. In December 2025, over 100 militants, included a senior commander, surrendered to locals authorities.

In June 2026, BRA attacks convoys of Oil and Gas Development Company Limited and killed employees in Dera Bugti and Kashmore (Sindh). In August 2026, BRA claims responsibility for an attack against Shafi Muhammad Abro, an alleged "State Death squad" in Kacchi.

== See also ==
- Separatist movements of Pakistan
