= Balochistan Liberation Front =

Baloch separatist group in southwestern Asia

- بلۏچستان آجوییءِ سنگر
- Founder: Jumma Khan Marri
- Leaders: Allah Nazar Baloch (2003–present); Jumma Khan Marri (left the group)
- Military leader: Wahid Kambar (until 2024)
- Spokesperson: Ghram Baloch
- Founded: 1964
- Dates active: 1964–1977; 2000–present
- Group: Saddo Operational Battalion
- Headquarters: Quetta, Pakistan
- Active regions: Pakistan; (Balochistan, Pakistan) Balochistan; Iran; Sistan and Baluchestan; Afghanistan; Kandahar
- Ideology: Baloch nationalism Socialism; Historical: Marxism–Leninism
- Status: Active
- Part of: Baloch Raaji Aajoi Sangar
- Wars: Insurgency in Balochistan; Third Balochistan conflict; Fourth Balochistan conflict; Fifth Balochistan conflict; Sistan and Baluchestan insurgency; Insurgency in Sindh

The Balochistan Liberation Front (BLF; Balochi: بلۏچستان آجوییءِ سنگر) is an Afghanistan-based Baloch ethnonationalist separatist militant group actively waging an insurgency in the Balochistan province of Pakistan.

The separatist group was founded by Jumma Khan Marri in 1964 in Damascus, Syria and played an important role in the 1968–1973 insurgency in the Sistan-Balochistan province of Iran and 1973–1977 insurgency in Balochistan province of Pakistan.

The group re-emerged in 2004 after Allah Nazar Baloch took command of the militant group in 2003. Since then, the BLF has taken responsibility for attacks on Pakistani soldiers and policemen. The group has also claimed responsibility for massacres of non-Baloch civilians inside Balochistan.

Like other Baloch separatist groups, it has been supported by India's Research and Analysis Wing (RAW), and is allegedly used in the insurgency against Pakistan. It has also been used to target the China–Pakistan Economic Corridor (CPEC), segments of which pass through Balochistan.

== History and relations ==
=== 1964–1969 ===
The group was founded by Jumma Khan Marri in 1964 in Damascus, Syria. Four years after its formation, the group took part in the third Balochistan conflict against the government of Iran, which had also spilled over into Pakistan, because of the BLF launching raids on Pakistani outposts. During this time, the Iraqi government publicly supported the BLF, providing them with weapons and operational support to fight against the Iranian government. However, after five years of fighting, the BLF and other Baloch militant groups were decimated by Iranian and Pakistani forces. The militant groups involved in the conflict negotiated an end to fighting with the government of Iran, and Iraq had stopped openly supporting the BLF with arms. However, the government of Iraq had still maintained relations with the group's leadership. Syria had also provided support to the group.

=== 1973–1977 ===
Following the end of the conflict with Iran, the BLF and other Baloch militant groups began an insurgency from 1973 to 1977 against the government of Pakistan. Initially the Iraqi government covertly provided the BLF and other militant groups with arms and ammunition. Due to Iraq's support for Baloch separatists, Pakistani forces had launched a raid on the Iraqi embassy in 1973.

The Indian journalist Avinash Paliwal states that during the 1970s, Junior level Indian intelligence officials were actively involved in operations in Balochistan. The officers stated that: "we gave Baloch everything, too from money to guns, during the 1970s, everything". On 10 February 1973, the Pakistani government raided the Iraqi embassy in Islamabad and uncovered crates of small arms and ammunition that were allegedly being supplied to the BLF and other militant groups. In response, the Pakistani government launched military operations against the BLF, which pushed them out of Balochistan into Afghanistan by the end of 1974. The Republic of Afghanistan was a sanctuary for all anti-Pakistani militant groups and from 1975 to 1980, it was estimated that it provided BLF members based in Afghanistan with $875,000 annually. While in exile in Afghanistan, the Soviet Union also allegedly helped BLF to regroup, allowing it rejoin the 1973-1977 insurgency. The insurgency came to an end in November 1977 with the government of Pakistan emerging victorious.

=== 1977–2003 ===
From 1977 to 2004, the status of the BLF was unknown. However, according to reports, the group hadn't disbanded and went underground instead.

=== 2003 onwards ===
The group re-emerged in 2004 after Allah Nazar Baloch had taken command of it in 2003. The group has been responsible for attacks on civilians, journalists, government officials and military personnel in Balochistan since it re-emerged in 2004.

In 2015, The Hindu newspaper reported that it was once again contacted by the BLF to confirm its growing connections with India.

In February 2018, Jumma Khan Marri, the founder of the BLF, stated that he and his followers had left the separatist groups. He stated that he had "sacrificed everything for a movement which turned out to be fundamentally faulty and empty from within". He also claimed that BLF and Baloch freedom struggle had been hijacked by India. Marri insisted that India is behind the unrest in Balochistan. He disclosed that if India stops the money supplies, the insurgency would end the very next day.

== Activities ==
=== 2004 onwards ===
The group has been responsible for attacks on civilians, journalists, government officials and military personnel in Balochistan since it re-emerged in 2004. The group along with another separatist group, the Baloch Liberation Army (BLA), has claimed responsibility for killing 27 Journalists out of the total 38 journalists killed in Balochistan province since 2007.

In August 2012, Reporters Without Borders (RWB) announced that BBC’s Urdu service correspondent in Quetta Ayub Tareen has been threatened by the BLF for his perceived partisan reporting on the group's political activities.

On early 27 July 2013, gunmen attacked a coastguard checkpost in Suntsar, Gwadar District. The attack was carried out by 24 gunmen which resulted in death of 7 coast guards and injured 7 others. Two injured coast guards were also kidnapped by the militants. The Baloch Liberation Front claimed responsibility for the attack on the coastguard checkpost. The BLF also stated that two of their militants were also killed in the attack.

On 12 April 2015, 20 construction workers from Punjab and Sindh province were gunned down in Turbat, which the BLF later claimed responsibility for. After the attack, the Home Minister of Balochistan, Sarfraz Bugti claimed that Indian intelligence agencies were involved in supporting the BLF in carrying out such attacks. The BLF claimed that the laborers were workers of the Frontier Works Organization (FWO) construction company.

On 16 November 2017, the bullet-riddled bodies of 15 migrants were discovered in the city of Turbat. Security officials state that while attempting to cross the border, the migrants were kidnapped by armed men who later killed them. The BLF later claimed responsibility for the murder of the 15 migrants. The mastermind of the attack, Younas Taukali, was killed by Pakistani security forces in November 2017. Younas Taukali was one of the top eight commanders of the Baloch Liberation Front.

=== 2023 ===
On 6 May 2023, Mohammad Asa (with the alias Mullah Ibrahim) was killed in a clash between different factions of the BLF over division of extorted money. Mohammad Asa was a top member of BLF and carried a bounty of PKR 4 million placed on his head by law enforcement agencies of Pakistan. He had joined the ranks of the BLF in 2010 and quickly rose to become one of its leaders. He was responsible for attacks on workers involved in development projects, Iranian containers, and law enforcement agencies of Pakistan.

On 18 June 2023, BLF commander, Ali Nawaz Rind, was killed under mysterious circumstances in "a neighboring country". Some sources attribute his death to be a result of in-fighting among the BLF's ranks. Rind was prominent BLF commander and was part of the BLF since 2014. He was also involved in number of attacks on law enforcement agencies in Pakistan.

=== 2024 ===
Wahid Kambar, who was regarded as the foundational architect of the BLF and mentor to Allah Nazar Baloch, was abducted and subsequently arrested by Pakistani security agencies on 19 July of 2024 in either the Kerman province or the Sistan-Baluchestan province of Iran. This was confirmed by the BLF itself on 28 July 2024. Wahid Kambar had been active throughout the Insurgency in Balochistan, including both the fourth Balochistan conflict and the recent fifth Balochistan conflict.

=== 2026 ===
The Baloch Liberation Front claimed to have participated in the Jan–Feb 2026 Balochistan attacks alongside the Baloch Liberation Army (BLA).
