= Ghazan Marri =

Pakistani politician

Gazain Marri (Urdu: مير گزین مری) is a politician from Balochistan, Pakistan. Marri is the son of politician Nawab Khair Bakhsh Marri.

== Life ==
In 2006, he was arrested in the United Arab Emirates at the request of the Pakistan authorities, in connection with the murder of judge Nawaz Marri. He was later tried in an anti-terrorist court in Pakistan.

In 2017, he returned to Pakistan, ending an 18-year exile in the UAE. Marri said he intended to face all court cases pending against him, and would join mainstream politics.
