= Bugti (disambiguation) =

The Bugti are a Baloch tribe.

Bugti may also refer to:

== Places ==
- Bugti Hills, Balochistan, Pakistan
- Dera Bugti District, Balochistan, Pakistan

== People with the name ==
- Abdul Raziq Bugti (1952–2007), Pakistani politician
- Akbar Bugti (1927–2006), Baloch nationalist, chief of the Bugti tribe and leader of the Bugti militia
- Brahumdagh Bugti, Baloch nationalist, grandson of Akbar
- Mir Ali Dost Bugti (1920–1984), Pakistani judge
- Shahbaz Khan Bugti (1897–1989), chief of the Bugti tribe
- Talal Akbar Bugti (1952–2015), Pakistani politician, son of Akbar
- Sarfraz Bugti (born 1980), Chief Minister of Balochistan, Pakistan
- Shahzain Bugti (born 1976), Pakistani politician, a leader of the Bugti tribe
- Gohram Bugti (born 1980), Pakistani politician, a leader of the Bugti tribe

== Others ==
- Bugti militia, Baloch militant group active in the insurgency in Balochistan
