= NA-253 Ziarat-cum-Harnai-cum-Sibbi-cum-Kohlu-cum-Dera Bugti =

Constituency of the National Assembly of Pakistan

- Constituency for the National Assembly of Pakistan
- Region: Sibi Division
- Electorate: 355,316

Current constituency
- Created: 2022
- Party: Pakistan Muslim League (N)
- Member: Mian Khan Mondrani
- Created from: NA-259 (Dera Bugti-cum-Kohlu-cum-Barkhan-cum-Sibbi-cum-Lehri); NA-258 (Loralai-cum-Musakhel-cum-Ziarat-cum-Duki-cum-Harnai)

NA-253 Ziarat-cum-Harnai-cum-Sibbi-cum-Kohlu-cum-Dera Bugti (این اے-۲۵۳،زیارت-بمع-ہرنائی-بمع-سبی-بمع-کوہلو-بمع-ڈیرہ بگٹی) is a newly-created constituency for the National Assembly of Pakistan. It comprises the districts of Harnai, Sibi, Kohlu and Dera Bugti from the province of Balochistan.

== Assembly Segments ==
| Constituency number | Constituency | District | Current MPA | Party |
|---|---|---|---|---|
| 7 | PB-7 Ziarat cum Harnai | Harnai | Noor Muhammad | PML(N) |
| 7 | PB-7 Ziarat cum Harnai | Ziarat | Noor Muhammad | PML(N) |
| 8 | PB-8 Sibi | Sibi | Sarfraz Chakar Domki | PPP |
| 9 | PB-9 Kohlu | Kohlu | Changez Khan Marri | PML(N) |
| 10 | PB-10 Dera Bugti | Dera Bugti | Sarfraz Bugti | PPP |

== Members of Parliament ==
=== 2018–2023: NA-259 Dera Bugti-cum-Kohlu-cum-Barkhan-cum-Sibbi-cum-Lehri ===
| Election | Member | Party |
|---|---|---|
| 2018 | Shahzain Bugti | JWP |

=== 2024–present: NA-253 Ziarat-cum-Harnai-cum-Sibbi-cum-Kohlu-cum-Dera Bugti ===
| Election | Member | Party |
|---|---|---|
| 2024 | Mian Khan Mondrani | PML(N) |

== Election 2018 ==
General elections were held on 25 July 2018.

General election 2018: NA-259 Dera Bugti-cum-Kohlu-cum-Barkhan-cum-Sibbi-cum-Lehri
| Party | Candidate | Votes | % | ±% |
|---|---|---|---|---|
| JWP | Shahzain Bugti | 22,787 | 15.43 | |
| Independent | Mir Tariq Mehmood Khan Khetran | 21,213 | 14.37 | |
| PPP | Mir Baz Muhammad Khetran | 17,578 | 11.91 | |
| Independent | Mian Khan Mondrani | 16,300 | 11.04 | |
| Independent | Mir Hair Bayar Khan Domki | 12,807 | 8.67 | |
| BAP | Mir Dostain Khan Domki | 11,930 | 8.08 | |
| MMA | Mir Baz Muhammad | 6,113 | 4.14 | |
| Independent | Jalnamb Khan Bugti | 5,527 | 3.74 | |
| PTI | Babar Marghzai | 5,422 | 3.67 | |
| Independent | Mir Liaquat Ali Khan | 5,243 | 3.55 | |
| BNP (M) | Abdul Ghaffar | 3,016 | 2.04 | |
| TLP | Muhammad Siddique | 2,879 | 1.95 | |
| Independent | Attaullah | 2,840 | 1.92 | |
| PMAP | Noor Ahmed Shah | 2,575 | 1.74 | |
| BNM | Abdul Hayi Baloch | 2,318 | 1.57 | |
| TLI | Faqeerullah Jan | 2,090 | 1.42 | |
| NP | Mehrab Khan | 1,868 | 1.27 | |
| Independent | Syed Abdul Hayi Shah Rashdi | 1,164 | 0.79 | |
| Others | Others (thirteen candidates) | 3,970 | 2.69 | |
| Turnout | | 159,148 | 44.79 | |
| Total valid votes | | 147,640 | 92.77 | |
| Rejected ballots | | 11,508 | 7.23 | |
| Majority | | 1,574 | 1.06 | |
| Registered electors | | 355,316 | | |
| JWP win (new seat) | | | | |

== Election 2024 ==
General elections were held on 8 February 2024. Mian Khan Mondrani won the election with 54,506 votes.

General election 2024: NA-253 Ziarat-cum-Harnai-cum-Sibbi-cum-Kohlu-cum-Dera Bugti
| Party | Candidate | Votes | % | ±% |
|---|---|---|---|---|
| PML(N) | Mian Khan Mondrani | 54,506 | 23.29 | ▲12.25 |
| PML(Q) | Mir Dostain Khan Domki | 45,532 | 19.45 | N/A |
| JUI (F) | Naseer Ahmed Kakar | 32,600 | 13.93 | N/A |
| JWP | Shahzain Bugti | 32,345 | 13.82 | ▼1.60 |
| PTI | Sadam Tareen (Note: Filed nomination papers as PTI candidate but ECP allowed him to run as an Independent) | 29,795 | 12.73 | ▲9.06 |
| PMAP | Habib Ur Rehman | 13,887 | 5.93 | ▲4.19 |
| BNP (M) | Malik Gaman Khan Marri | 9,059 | 3.87 | ▲1.83 |
| Others | Others (twenty three candidates) | 16,347 | 6.98 | |
| Turnout | | 241,847 | 53.35 | ▲8.56 |
| Total valid votes | | 234,071 | 96.78 | |
| Rejected ballots | | 7,776 | 3.22 | |
| Majority | | 8,974 | 3.83 | |
| Registered electors | | 453,352 | | |
| PML(N) gain from PTI | | | | |

== See also ==
- NA-252 Loralai-cum-Musakhel-cum-Duki-cum-Barkhan
- NA-254 Nasirabad-cum-Kachhi-cum-Jhal Magsi
