= Dombki =

Baloch tribe in Sindh and Balochistan, Pakistan

Domki (Balochi: دومکی) is a Baloch tribe in Balochistan.

== Notable people ==
- Mir Sarfraz Chakar Domki, former Provincial minister of local government
- Mir Dostain Khan Domki, Former Federal Minister of Science and technology
- Sardar Mir Kohyar Khan Domki, Chief of Domki
- Mir Ali Mardan Khan Domki, Former Chief Minister of Balochistan
