= Sarfraz Bugti ministry =

Incumbent Cabinet of Balochistan, Pakistan

Sarfraz Bugti Ministry
- 14 Cabinet of Balochistan, Pakistan
- Date formed: 2 March 2024

People and organisations
- Governor: Sheikh Jaffar Khan Mandokhail
- Chief Minister: Sarfraz Bugti
- Member party: PPP; PMLN; BAP; NP; ANP; IPP; PSP; JUP-N; MQM-P; MQM-L; PTI-P; ITP; PML(Q); PML(Z)
- Opposition party: JIP; SIC; BNP(M); TLP; PkMAP; PKNAP; JWP; HDTB; BNP(A); HDP; MWM; PTI; AP; JUI (F); ST
- Opposition leader: Mir Younus Aziz Zehri

History
- Election: 2024 Balochistan provincial election

The Sarfraz Bugti Ministry is the provincial cabinet of Balochistan, Pakistan, Pakistan, headed by Chief Minister of Balochistan Sarfraz Bugti. The 14-member cabinet was sworn in on 2 March 2024.

== Formation ==
The formation of the cabinet came almost two months after the elected representatives of the provincial assembly took office, and more than a month and a half since the appointment of the chief minister of the province. Governor of Balochistan Abdul Wali Kakar took oath from the cabinet.

== Cabinet members ==
Cabinet of Balochistan under Chief Minister Sarfraz Bugti
Post	Minister	Party	Oath
Chief Minister of Balochistan	Sarfraz Bugti	PPP	2 March 2024
Minister of Communication, Works, Physical Planning and Housing	Mir Saleem Ahmed Khoso	PPP	19 April 2024
Minister of Home & Tribal Affairs and Prisons	Mir Ziaullah Langau	BAP	26 November 2024
Minister of Public Health Engineering	Sheikh Zarak Khan Mandokhail	PMLN	1 April 2025
Minister of Local Government & Rural Development	Mir Asghar Rind	PPP	1 April 2025
Minister of Irrigation	Mir Muhammad Sadiq Umrani	PPP	19 April 2024
Minister of Health	Maulana Noorullah	PPP	1 April 2025
Minister of Revenue	Mir Mohammad Asim Kurd Gello	PMLN	19 April 2024
Minister of Planning & Development	Ali Madad Jattak	PPP	2 March 2026
Minister of Education	Rahila Durrani	PMLN	28 February 2024
Minister of Agriculture & Cooperatives	Asfand Yar Khan Kakar	PPP	19 April 2024
Minister of Women Development	Hadiya Nawaz	PMLN	2 March 2026
Minister of Finance & Mines and Mineral Development	Mir Shoaib Nosherwani	PMLN	19 April 2024
Minister of Livestock and Dairy Development	Faisal Khan Jamali	PPP	19 April 2024
Minister of Food	Wali Muhammad Noorazi	PMLN	2 March 2026

== Governance and reforms ==
Bugti outlined a comprehensive plan of about sixty measures aimed at enhancing governance. He urged ministers to actively engage with their respective departments, ensure effective service delivery and accountability. To assess progress, key performance indicators (KPIs) will be established to assess departmental performance.
