= Baloch Republican Students Organization =

Baloch Republican Students Organization بلوچ ریپبلکن اسٹوڈنٹس آرگنائزیشن
- Abbreviation: BRSO
- Chairman: Rehan Baloch
- General Secretary: Rozain Baloch
- Founder: Brahumdagh Bugti
- Founded: 2008
- Split from: Watan Students Federation
- National affiliation: Baloch Republican Party

Party flag
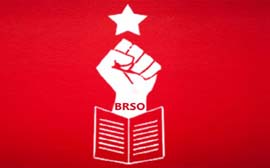

Website
- thebrso.com

The Baloch Republican Students Organization (Urdu: بلوچ ریپبلکن اسٹوڈنٹس آرگنائزیشن) is a prominent student and political organization that campaigns for the ethnic Baloch students in Pakistan's Balochistan province and other Baloch dominated areas in Pakistan. It was formed in 2008 after broke away from the Watan Students Federation, originally formed by Akbar Bugti.The first council session of the organization was held in 2009 in Balochistan University, Quetta. The BRSO is student wing of Baloch Republican Party headed by Brahumdagh Bugti.
