= Constituency NA-265 =

Former constituency of the National Assembly of Pakistan

Constituency NA-265 (Sibi-cum-Kohlu-cum-Dera Bugti)
- Former constituency for the National Assembly of Pakistan
- Region: Karachi District

Former constituency
- Abolished: 2018
- Replaced by: NA-259 (Dera Bugti-cum-Kohlu-cum-Barkhan-cum-Sibbi-cum-Lehri)

Constituency NA-265 (Sibi-cum-Kohlu-cum-Dera Bugti) (Urdu: این اے-۲۶۵، سبي-کهلو-ڈيزه بگٹي) was a constituency for the National Assembly of Pakistan.

== Election 2002 ==
General elections were held on 10 Oct 2002. Haider Bugti of Jamhoori Wattan Party won by 92,555 votes.

General election 2002: NA-265 (Sibi-cum-Kohlu-cum-Dera Bugt-cum-Harnai)
| Party | Candidate | Votes | % | ±% |
|---|---|---|---|---|
| JWP | Haider Bugti | 92,555 | 65.36 | |
| BNM | Mehrab Khan Balocah | 13,443 | 9.49 | |
| PML(Q) | Mir Bakhtiar Khan Domki | 13,130 | 9.27 | |
| PMAP | Ahmed Jan | 5,379 | 3.80 | |
| MMA | Abdul Qayum | 4,447 | 3.14 | |
| Independent | Hasnain Iqbal Minhas | 3,978 | 2.81 | |
| NA | Taj Muhammad Jamali | 3,141 | 2.22 | |
| Independent | Tariq Hussain Bugti | 2,749 | 1.94 | |
| Others | Others (two candidates) | 2,786 | 1.97 | |
| Turnout | | 144,110 | 46.68 | |
| Total valid votes | | 141,608 | 98.26 | |
| Rejected ballots | | 2,502 | 1.74 | |
| Majority | | 79,112 | 55.87 | |
| Registered electors | | 308,704 | | |

== Election 2008 ==
General elections were held on 18 Feb 2008. Mir Ahmadan Khan Bugti of PML-Q won by 56,715 votes.

General election 2008: NA-265 (Sibi-cum-Kohlu-cum-Dera Bugt-cum-Harnai)
| Party | Candidate | Votes | % | ±% |
|---|---|---|---|---|
| PML(Q) | Mir Anmadan Khan Bugti | 56,715 | 56.95 | |
| Independent | Mir Dostain Khan Domki | 17,411 | 17.48 | |
| PPP | Mir Jan Muhammad Masuri | 11,484 | 11.53 | |
| MMA | Attaullah | 7,205 | 7.23 | |
| Independent | Mir Baz Muhammad Marri | 6,315 | 6.34 | |
| Others | Others (two candidates) | 462 | 0.47 | |
| Turnout | | 101,312 | 35.94 | |
| Total valid votes | | 99,592 | 98.30 | |
| Rejected ballots | | 1,720 | 1.70 | |
| Majority | | 39,304 | 39.47 | |
| Registered electors | | 281,867 | | |

== Election 2013 ==
General elections were held on 11 May 2013. Mir Dostain Khan Domki of PML-N won by 17,894 votes and became the member of National Assembly.

General election 2013: NA-265 (Sibi-cum-Kohlu-cum-Dera Bugt-cum-Harnai)
| Party | Candidate | Votes | % | ±% |
|---|---|---|---|---|
| Independent | Mir Dostain Knan Domki | 22,874 | 26.50 | |
| PMAP | Ahmed Jan Khan | 12,929 | 14.98 | |
| Independent | Attaullah Khan Kalpar Bugti | 11,135 | 12.90 | |
| PML(Q) | Mir Anmadan Khan Bugti | 8,246 | 9.55 | |
| JUI (F) | Mir Baz Muhammad Marri | 7,402 | 8.57 | |
| PML(N) | Nawabzada Jangaiz Khan Mari | 6,668 | 7.72 | |
| PTI | Babar Marghazani | 6,037 | 6.99 | |
| Others | Others (sixteen candidates) | 11,043 | 12.79 | |
| Turnout | | 93,226 | 44.09 | |
| Total valid votes | | 86,334 | 92.61 | |
| Rejected ballots | | 6,892 | 7.39 | |
| Majority | | 9,945 | 11.52 | |
| Registered electors | | 211,471 | | |
