= Chief Minister of Balochistan =

Head of the provincial government of Balochistan

- Seal of Balochistan

- Provincial Flag of Balochistan
- Incumbent; Sarfraz Bugti since 2 March 2024
- Government of Balochistan
- Style: His Excellency
- Abbreviation: CM
- Member of: Provincial Assembly of Balochistan; Cabinet of Balochistan
- Reports to: Governor of Balochistan; Provincial Assembly of Balochistan
- Residence: Chief Minister House, Quetta
- Seat: Quetta
- Appointer: Provincial Assembly of Balochistan
- Term length: 5 years
- Constituting instrument: Constitution of Pakistan
- Inaugural holder: Ataullah Mengal
- Formation: 1 May 1972; 54 years ago
- Website: cm.balochistan.gob.pk

The Chief Minister of Balochistan (Urdu: وزیر اعلیٰ بلوچستان Balochi: سر وزیر بلوچستان; Pashto: د بلوچستان اعلیٰ وزیر; Dari: وزیر اعلی بلوچستان) is the head of government of Balochistan, Pakistan. The chief minister leads the legislative branch of the Government of Balochistan, and is elected by the Provincial Assembly. Given that he has the assembly's confidence, the chief minister's term is for five years and is subject to no term limits. Sarfraz Bugti is the current chief minister of Balochistan. The current Cabinet of Balochistan consists of 14 members

== Oath as the chief minister ==
The chief minister serves five years in office. The following is the English translation of oath of the chief minister of the province, as prescribed in the Third Schedule of the Constitution of Pakistan:

I, (Name), do swear solemnly that I am a Muslim and believe in the Unity and Oneness of Almighty Allah, the Books of Allah, the Holy Quran being the last of them, the Prophethood of Muhammad (peace be upon him) as the last of the prophets and that there can be no Prophet after him, the Day of Judgment, and all the requirements and teachings of the Holy Quran and Sunnah: That I will bear true faith and allegiance to Pakistan: That, as Chief Minister of the Province of Balochistan, I will discharge my duties, and perform my functions, honestly, to the best of my ability, faithfully in accordance with the Constitution of the Islamic Republic of Pakistan and the law, and always in the interest of the sovereignty, integrity, solidarity, well-being and prosperity of Pakistan: That I will not allow my personal interest to influence my official conduct or my official decisions: That I will preserve, protect and defend the Constitution of the Islamic Republic of Pakistan: That, in all circumstances, I will do right to all manner of people, according to law, without fear or favour, affection or ill-will: And that I will not directly or indirectly communicate or reveal to any person any matter which shall be brought under my consideration or shall become known to me as Chief Minister except as may be required for the due discharge of my duties as Chief Minister. May Allah Almighty help and guide me (Aameen).

— Third Schedule, Constitution of Pakistan

== Background ==
Fraction of time of the chief ministership held by party (excluding governor's rule and caretaker periods)
1. Pakistan Peoples Party (26.0%)
2. Pakistan Muslim League (Q) (16.0%)
3. Balochistan Awami Party (15.0%)
4. Independent (10.0%)
5. Islami Jamhoori Ittehad (8.00%)
6. Pakistan Muslim League (N) (7.00%)
7. National Party (8.00%)
8. Jamhoori Watan Party (5.00%)
9. BNP (Mengal) (4.00%)
10. National Awami Party (1.00%)

Although Balochistan had been administered as the Chief Commissioner's Province of British India and, after partition, as part of the Balochistan States Union and West Pakistan, it did not exist as a separate federating unit with its own legislature until 1970. Under the Legal Framework Order, 1970, promulgated by Yahya Khan, the One Unit scheme was dissolved and Balochistan was created as a separate province alongside North-West Frontier Province, Punjab and Sindh. The first provincial assembly elections were held on 17 December 1970, returning 21 members. However, the assembly was not convened until 2 May 1972, after the cessation of East Pakistan and the assumption of power by Zulfikar Ali Bhutto. The first session of the provincial assembly elected Ataullah Mengal of the National Awami Party (NAP) as the chief minister, with Ghaus Bakhsh Bizenjo sworn in as governor a day earlier.

The Mengal government, a NAP–JUI coalition, was dismissed by Prime Minister Bhutto on 13 February 1973 on charges of fomenting separatist activity following the discovery of an alleged arms cache at the Iraqi embassy in Islamabad. This was followed by a four-year insurgency and the imposition of governor's rule. Civilian rule was restored briefly in 1973 under Jam Ghulam Qadir Khan of the Pakistan Peoples Party (PPP), but the assembly was again suspended on 31 December 1975. After the coup of 5 July 1977 by Muhammad Zia-ul-Haq, martial law was imposed across the country, and Balochistan remained under Rahimuddin Khan's governorship until 1985.

Following the partyless elections of 1985, civilian government returned to the province under Jam Ghulam Qadir Khan. Since then, the province has been characterised by short-lived coalitions, no-confidence motions and high political volatility. The province experienced governor's rule again from October 1999 to December 2002 following the Musharraf coup, and briefly in early 2013 after the assassination of Hazara Shias in Quetta led to the dismissal of Aslam Raisani's government.

== List of chief ministers of Balochistan ==
National Awami Party (NAP) Pakistan Peoples Party (PPP) Pakistan Muslim League (N) Balochistan National Party (Mengal) Jamhoori Watan Party Pakistan Muslim League (Q) Balochistan Awami Party National Party Islami Jamhoori Ittehad Independent, acting or caretaker

N°	Chief minister		Party	Term of office			Ref.
N°	Portrait	Name	Party	Took office	Left office	Time in office	Ref.
1	Portrait of Ataullah Mengal	Ataullah Mengal	NAP	May 1, 1972	February 13, 1973	288 days	
2		Jam Ghulam Qadir Khan (first term)	PPP	April 27, 1973	December 31, 1975	2 years, 248 days	
–	Governor's rule			December 31, 1975	December 7, 1976	342 days	
3		Mohammad Khan Barozai	PPP	December 7, 1976	July 5, 1977	210 days	
–	Governor's rule and martial-law administration			July 5, 1977	April 6, 1985	7 years, 275 days	
4		Jam Ghulam Qadir Khan (second term)	Independent	April 6, 1985	May 29, 1988	3 years, 53 days	
5	Portrait of Zafarullah Khan Jamali	Zafarullah Khan Jamali	IJI	June 24, 1988	December 24, 1988	183 days	
–		Khuda Bakhsh Marri (caretaker)	Caretaker	December 24, 1988	February 5, 1989	43 days	
6	Portrait of Akbar Bugti	Nawab Akbar Khan Bugti	JWP	February 5, 1989	August 7, 1990	1 year, 183 days	
–		Mir Humayun Khan Marri (caretaker)	Caretaker	August 7, 1990	November 17, 1990	102 days	
7		Taj Muhammad Jamali	IJI	November 17, 1990	May 22, 1993	2 years, 186 days	
–	Portrait of Zulfikar Ali Magsi	Zulfikar Ali Magsi (caretaker)	Caretaker	May 30, 1993	July 19, 1993	50 days	
–		Nasir Mengal (caretaker)	Caretaker	July 19, 1993	October 20, 1993	93 days	
8	Portrait of Zulfikar Ali Magsi	Zulfikar Ali Magsi	PPP	October 20, 1993	November 9, 1996	3 years, 20 days	
–	Portrait of Zafarullah Khan Jamali	Zafarullah Khan Jamali (caretaker)	Caretaker	November 9, 1996	February 22, 1997	105 days	
9	Portrait of Akhtar Mengal	Akhtar Mengal	BNP(M)	February 22, 1997	July 29, 1998	1 year, 157 days	
10	Portrait of Mir Jan Mohammad Jamali	Mir Jan Mohammad Jamali	PML(N)	August 13, 1998	October 12, 1999	1 year, 60 days	
–	Governor's rule			October 12, 1999	December 1, 2002	3 years, 50 days	
11	Portrait of Jam Mohammad Yousaf	Jam Mohammad Yousaf	PML(Q)	December 1, 2002	November 19, 2007	4 years, 353 days	
–		Mohammad Saleh Bhutani (caretaker)	Caretaker	November 19, 2007	April 8, 2008	141 days	
12		Nawab Aslam Raisani	PPP	April 9, 2008	January 14, 2013	4 years, 280 days	
–	Governor's rule			January 14, 2013	March 13, 2013	58 days	
13		Nawab Aslam Raisani	PPP	March 13, 2013	March 23, 2013	10 days	
–	Portrait of Ghous Bakhsh Barozai	Nawab Ghous Bakhsh Barozai (caretaker)	Caretaker	March 23, 2013	June 7, 2013	76 days	
14	Portrait of Abdul Malik Baloch	Abdul Malik Baloch	NP	June 7, 2013	December 23, 2015	2 years, 199 days	
15		Sanaullah Khan Zehri	PML(N)	December 24, 2015	January 9, 2018	2 years, 16 days	
16	Portrait of Abdul Quddus Bizenjo	Abdul Quddus Bizenjo	PML(Q)	January 13, 2018	June 7, 2018	145 days	
–	Portrait of Alauddin Marri	Alauddin Marri (caretaker)	Caretaker	June 7, 2018	August 18, 2018	72 days	
17	Portrait of Jam Kamal Khan	Jam Kamal Khan	BAP	August 19, 2018	October 24, 2021	3 years, 66 days	
18	Portrait of Abdul Quddus Bizenjo	Abdul Quddus Bizenjo	BAP	October 29, 2021	August 18, 2023	1 year, 293 days	
–		Ali Mardan Khan Domki (caretaker)	Caretaker	August 18, 2023	March 2, 2024	197 days	
19		Sarfraz Bugti	PPP	March 2, 2024	Incumbent	2 years, 255 days	

== Statistics ==
List of chief ministers by length of term

#	Chief Minister	Party	Term of office	
#	Chief Minister	Party	Longest continuous term	Total duration of chief ministership
1	Jam Mohammad Yousaf	PML(Q)	4 years, 353 days	4 years, 353 days
2	Aslam Raisani	PPP	4 years, 280 days	4 years, 280 days
3	Jam Ghulam Qadir Khan	Independent*	3 years, 53 days	5 years, 274 days
4	Jam Kamal Khan	BAP	3 years, 66 days	3 years, 66 days
5	Zulfiqar Ali Magsi	PPP	3 years, 20 days	3 years, 20 days
6	Abdul Malik Baloch	NP	2 years, 199 days	2 years, 199 days
7	Taj Muhammad Jamali	IJI	2 years, 186 days	2 years, 186 days
8	Sanaullah Khan Zehri	PML(N)	2 years, 16 days	2 years, 16 days
9	Abdul Quddus Bizenjo	BAP*	1 year, 293 days	2 years, 73 days
10	Akbar Bugti	Jamhoori Watan Party	1 year, 183 days	1 year, 183 days
11	Akhtar Mengal	BNP (M)	1 year, 157 days	1 year, 157 days
12	Jan Mohammad Jamali	PML(N)	1 year, 60 days	1 year, 60 days
13	Ataullah Mengal	National Awami Party (Pakistan, 1957)	288 days	288 days
14	Mohammad Khan Barozai	PPP	210 days	210 days
15	Zafarullah Khan Jamali	IJI	183 days	183 days
16	Sarfraz Bugti	PPP*	2 years, 255 days	2 years, 255 days

* indicates incumbent or party affiliation across multiple terms

List by political party

Parties by total time-span of their member holding the Chief Minister's Office (as of 12 November 2026)
No.	Political party	Number of elected chief ministers	Total days holding the CMO
1	Pakistan Peoples Party	4	5030 days
2	Pakistan Muslim League (Q)	2	1959 days
3	Balochistan Awami Party	2	1820 days
4	Independent	1	1149 days
5	Pakistan Muslim League (N)	2	1172 days
6	Islami Jamhoori Ittehad	2	1100 days
7	National Party	1	929 days
8	Jamhoori Watan Party	1	548 days
9	Balochistan National Party (Mengal)	1	522 days
10	National Awami Party	1	288 days

== See also ==
- Governor of Balochistan
- Government of Balochistan
- Chief Secretary Balochistan
- Provincial Assembly of Balochistan
- List of current Pakistani chief ministers
- List of current Pakistani governors
- Chief Minister of Khyber Pakhtunkhwa
- Chief Minister of Punjab (Pakistan)
- Chief Minister of Sindh
