= Abd al-Raziq =

Muslim male given name

ʻAbd al-Rāziq (ALA-LC romanization of Arabic: عبد الرازق) is a Muslim male given name.

== People ==
- Abdul Raziq Achakzai (1979–2018), former Afghan police chief
- Abdul Raziq Bugti
- Abousfian Abdelrazik (born 1962), Sudanese-Canadian accused of terrorism
- Ali Abdel Raziq (1888–1966), Egyptian Islamic scholar
- Mahmoud Abdel Razek Fadlallah, known as Shikabala (born 1986), Egyptian footballer
- Abdul Raziq Bugti (1952–2007), Pakistani politician
- Abdul Raziq (politician), Pakistani politician
