= Mian Khan Mondrani =

Member of the National Assembly of Pakistan from Balochistan (2024–2029)

- میاں خان موندرانی

Member of the National Assembly of Pakistan
- Incumbent
- Assumed office 29 February 2024
- Constituency: NA-253 Ziarat-cum-Harnai-cum-Sibbi-cum-Kohlu-cum-Dera Bugti

Personal details
- Party: PMLN (2024-present)

Mian Khan Mondrani (Urdu: میاں خان موندرانی) is a Pakistani politician who has been a member of the National Assembly of Pakistan since February 2024.

== Political career ==
Mondrani won the 2024 Pakistani general election from NA-253 Ziarat-cum-Harnai-cum-Sibbi-cum-Kohlu-cum-Dera Bugti as an Independent candidate. He received 46,683 votes while runner up Mir Dostain Khan Domki of Pakistan Muslim League (N) received 44,643 votes.
