= Mir Ahmadan Khan Bugti =

Pakistani politician

Member of the National Assembly of Pakistan
- In office 2008–2013
- Constituency: NA-265 (Sibi-cum-Kohlu-cum-Dera Bugti)

Mir Ahmadan Khan Bugti is a Pakistani politician who was a member of the National Assembly of Pakistan from 2008 to 2013.

== Political career ==
He was elected to the National Assembly of Pakistan from Constituency NA-265 (Sibi-cum-Kohlu-cum-Dera Bugti-cum-Herna) as a candidate of Pakistan Muslim League (Q) (PML-Q) in the 2008 Pakistani general election. He received 56,715 votes and defeated Mir Dostain Khan Domki.

He ran for the seat of the National Assembly from Constituency NA-265 (Sibi-cum-Kohlu-cum-Dera Bugti- cum-Harani) as a candidate of PML-Q in the 2013 Pakistani general election but was unsuccessful. He received 8,246 votes and lost the seat to Mir Dostain Khan Domki.
