= Mir Dostain Khan Domki =

Pakistani politician

Minister of State for Science and Technology
- In office 10 August 2017 – 31 May 2018
- President: Mamnoon Hussain
- Prime Minister: Shahid Khaqan Abbasi

Member of the National Assembly of Pakistan
- In office 1 June 2013 – 31 May 2018
- Constituency: NA-265 (Sibi-cum-Kohlu-cum-Dera Bugti- cum-Harani)

Personal details
- Born: March 18, 1974 (age 52)
- Relations: Ali Mardan Khan Domki (brother)

Mir Dostain Khan Domki (Urdu: میر دوستین خان ڈومکی; born 18 March 1974) is a Pakistani politician who had been a member of the National Assembly of Pakistan from June 2013 to May 2018. He served as Minister of State for Science and Technology from August to May 2018 in the cabinet of Prime Minister Shahid Khaqan Abbasi.

== Early life ==
He was born on 18 March 1974.

== Political career ==
He ran for the seat of National Assembly of Pakistan as an independent candidate from Constituency NA-265 (Sibi-cum-Kohlu-cum-Dera Bugti-cum-Hernai) in the 2008 Pakistani general election but was unsuccessful. He received 17,411 votes and lost the seat to Mir Ahmadan Khan Bugti.

He was elected to the National Assembly as an independent candidate from Constituency NA-265 (Sibi-cum-Kohlu-cum-Dera Bugti- cum-Harani) in the 2013 Pakistani general election. He received 22,874 votes and defeated Ahmed Jan Khan, a candidate of Pashtunkhwa Milli Awami Party.

Following the election of Shahid Khaqan Abbasi as Prime Minister of Pakistan in August 2017, he was inducted into the cabinet of Abbasi as Minister of State for Science and Technology. In November 2017, he announced to step down from the ministerial office of Science and Technology after Rana Tanveer Hussain was appointed as Federal Minister for Science and Technology. His resignation was not accepted until December 2017.

In April 2018, he quit PML-N and joined the newly created Balochistan Awami Party (BAP). Upon the dissolution of the National Assembly on the expiration of its term on 31 May 2018, Domki ceased to hold the office as Minister of State for Science and Technology.

He ran for the seat of the National Assembly as an BAP candidate from NA-259 Dera Bugti-cum-Kohlu-cum-Barkhan-cum-Sibbi-cum-Lehri in the 2018 Pakistani general election but was unsuccessful. He received 11,930 votes and was defeated by Shahzain Bugti, a candidate of the Jamhoori Wattan Party.
