= Charter of Democracy =

Pakistani Political Declaration

The Charter of Democracy (Urdu: میثاق جمہوریت) was signed by Nawaz Sharif of Pakistan Muslim League and Benazir Bhutto of Pakistan Peoples Party on 14 May 2006 in London. The document, signaling an alliance between two significant political parties of Pakistan, outlines steps to end the military rule established by the 1999 Pakistani coup d'état led by General Pervez Musharraf and restore civilian democratic rule.
