= Gohram Bugti =

Pakistani politician

Member of the Provincial Assembly of the Balochistan
- In office 13 August 2018 – 12 August 2023
- Constituency: PB-10 Dera Bugti

Personal details
- Born: 15 November 1978 (age 47) Dera Bugti District, Balochistan Pakistan
- Party: JWP (2018-present)
- Relations: Shahzain Bugti (brother); Akbar Bugti (grand father)
- Parent: Talal Akbar Bugti (father)

Gohram Bugti is a Pakistani politician, who served as a been a member of the Provincial Assembly of the Balochistan from August 2018 to August 2023.

He is the grand son of Nawab Akbar Bugti, founder of Jamhoori Watan Party and son of Talal Bugti.
