= Mir Sarfraz Chakar Domki =

Pakistani politician (1969–2024)

Sardar Sarfraz Chakar Khan Domki

Provincial Minister of Balochistan for Labour and Manpower
- In office 8 September 2018 – 12 August 2023

Provincial Minister of Balochistan for Culture, Archives and Tourism
- In office 30 August 2018 – 8 September 2018

Member of the Provincial Assembly of Balochistan
- In office 28 February 2024 – 16 September 2024
- Constituency: PB-8 Sibi
- In office 13 August 2018 – 12 August 2023
- Constituency: PB-7 Sibbi-cum-Lehri
- In office 29 May 2013 – 31 May 2018

Personal details
- Born: 12 August 1969 Lehri District, West Pakistan, Pakistan]
- Died: 16 September 2024 (aged 55) Karachi, Sindh, Pakistan
- Party: PPP (2024); BAP (2018–2023)
- Children: Mir Kohyar Khan Domki (son)

Sardar Mir Sarfraz Chakar Khan Domki (Urdu: میر سرفراز چکر ڈومکی; 12 August 1969 – 16 September 2024) was eldest son of Sardar Chakar Khan Domki, Tumandar of Tribe and Pakistani politician and chief of the Domki tribe who was the Provincial Minister of Balochistan for Services and General Administration, in office from September 2018 to August 2023. He had been a member of the Provincial Assembly of Balochistan from August 2018 to August 2023 and from February 2024 till his death. Previously, he served as Provincial Minister of Balochistan for Culture, Archives and Tourism, from 30 August 2018 to 8 September 2018.

Domki was a member of the Provincial Assembly of Balochistan from May 2013 to May 2018.

== Early life and education ==
Mir Domki was born in Lehri District on 12 August 1969. He held a degree in Bachelor of Arts.

== Political career ==
Domki served as assistant commissioner and additional deputy commissioner in the Government of Balochistan between 1988 and 2010.

He was elected to the Provincial Assembly of Balochistan as a candidate of Pakistan Muslim League (N) from Constituency PB-21 Sibi in the 2013 Pakistani general election.

Domki was re-elected to the Provincial Assembly of Balochistan as a candidate of Balochistan Awami Party (BAP) from Constituency PB-7 (Sibbi-cum-Lehri) in the 2018 Pakistani general election.

On 27 August 2018, he was inducted into the provincial Balochistan cabinet of Chief Minister of Jam Kamal Khan. On 30 August, he was appointed Provincial Minister of Balochistan for Culture, Archives and Tourism. On 8 September 2018, he was redesignated as Provincial Minister of Balochistan for Labour and Manpower.

== Death ==
Domki died in Karachi on 16 September 2024, at the age of 55.
