= Shahbaz Khan Bugti =

Indian knight

Nawab Sir Shahbaz Khan Bugti, KCIE (Sindhi: سر شھباز خان بگٽي) was a tribal chief of the Bugtis in Balochistan.

He was knighted as a Knight Commander of the Order of the Indian Empire (KCIE) in November 1901 for fighting for the British Colonial Government of India and for his service to the British colonials. In addition, Sir Shahbaz received large gifts of land in Balochistan. He is also mentioned in the book The Tigers of Balochistan.

== Family ==
He was the father of Nawab Mehrab Khan Bugti and Nawabzada Sardar Sohrab Khan Bugti. He was the grandfather of Nawabzada Abdul Rahman Bugti, Nawab Akbar Khan Bugti, Nawabzada Ahmad Nawaz Bugti, Nawabzadi Hayat Bugti, Nawabzadi Sardar Bibi Bugti, Nawabzadi Munawwar Bugti, Nawabzadi Noorjahan Bugti & Sardar Ghulam Mustafa Khan Bugti. He had 56 great-grandchildren.
