= Sarfraz Bugti =

Chief Minister of Balochistan, Pakistan

- سرفراز بگٹی

Chief Minister of Balochistan
- Incumbent
- Assumed office 2 March 2024
- Governor: Abdul Wali Kakar; Sheikh Jaffar Khan Mandokhail
- Preceded by: Ali Mardan Khan Domki

Member of the Provincial Assembly of Balochistan
- Incumbent
- Assumed office 29 February 2024
- Constituency: PB-10 Dera Bugti

Federal Minister for Interior & Narcotics Control, Overseas Pakistanis and Human Resource Development Caretaker
- In office 17 August 2023 – 15 December 2023
- President: Arif Alvi
- Prime Minister: Anwaar ul Haq Kakar
- Preceded by: Rana Sanaullah
- Succeeded by: Chaudhry Salik Hussain; Aun Chaudhry; Mohsin Naqvi

Minister for Home & Tribal Affairs of Balochistan
- In office January 13, 2018 – May 31, 2018
- In office October 14, 2013 – January 1, 2018

Pakistani Senator from Balochistan
- In office March 2015 – March 2021

Personal details
- Born: June 1, 1980 (age 46) Dera Bugti District, Balochistan, Pakistan
- Party: PPP (2024-present)
- Other political affiliations: BAP (2018-2023); PMLN (2013-2018)

Mir Sarfraz Bugti (Note: Urdu, Balochi: میر سرفراز بگٹی) (born 1 June 1980) is a Pakistani politician who is the Chief Minister of Balochistan since March 2024. He belongs to the Pakistan People's Party. Prior to this, Bugti was Home and Tribal Affairs Minister of Balochistan. Bugti was a senator from March 2015 to March 2021. He has also served as the chief of the Bugti tribe in Balochistan since 29 December 2025.

On 17 August 2023, he took oath as caretaker Interior Minister and resigned from the position on 15 December 2023.

== Early life and education ==
Sarfraz was born on 1 June 1980, in a village in Bekar, Dera Bugti, Balochistan, Pakistan.

His father Mir Ghulam Qadir Masori Bugti was a tribal elder of the Masori sub-clan of the Bugti tribe who was a member of General Zia's Majlis-e-Shoora before becoming a part of the Pakistan People's Party (PPP). Mir Ghulam was known to be active against the sardari or neo-feudal system of Balochistan and being a political rival of Nawab Akbar Bugti.

His brother Jan Mohammad Bugti has also been active in politics as a PPP candidate.

Sarfraz completed his early education at the Lawrence College, Murree before enrolling at the Quaid-i-Azam University, Islamabad to study Defence and Strategic Studies (DSS) but had to interrupt his higher education when his father was jailed by Pervez Musharraf.

Sarfraz was arrested in 2007 when he reached his village to oversee preparations for the forthcoming elections and later jailed under maintenance of public order charges and Jan Muhammad Bugti was allegedly kidnapped by security agencies from the office of the Election Commission in Dera Bugti when he had gone there to file his nomination paper.

Later, he tried to join the Pakistan Army and to pass the Inter-Services Selection Board (ISSB) exams.

== Political career ==
=== Provincial politics in Balochistan ===
In 2013, he won the Provincial Assembly elections from Constituency PB-24 as a representative of the Baloch community from Dera Bugti with a clear majority as an independent candidate by securing 10013 votes, and after elections joined PML (N).

Sarfraz became Minister of Interior of Balochistan on 14 October 2013.

=== National politics as Caretaker Interior Minister ===
In August 2023, he took charge as the country's Caretaker Interior Minister. One of his first decisions was to ask for the release of the Pashtun Tahafuz Movement (PTM) activists.

On 15 December 2023, he resigned from this position in order to contest the 2024 Pakistani general election. In December 2023, Bugti joined Pakistan People's Party.

== Chief Minister of Balochistan (2024–present) ==
In 2024, Bugti was elected unopposed as the Chief Minister of Balochistan. This came after he joined the Pakistan People's Party (PPP). He also got the support of Pakistan Muslim League (N) (PMLN). His nomination for this post was announced by People's Party Co-Chairman Asif Ali Zardari. Bugti outlined a comprehensive plan of about sixty measures aimed at enhancing governance. He urged ministers to actively engage with their respective departments, ensure effective service delivery and accountability. To assess progress, key performance indicators (KPIs) will be established to assess departmental performance.

== Political views ==
=== Pakistani nationalism ===
Baloch journalist Malik Siraj Akbar has called Sarfraz a representative of "hyper Pakistani nationalism", which he considers being engineered by the country's establishment.

=== Islamic welfare state ===
Sarfraz is a proponent of an Islamic welfare state. This is in order to combat Balochistan’s high poverty rate.

=== Activism against Baloch separatism ===
Sarfraz is a notable critic of Baloch separatism, and has spoken against the organization Baluchistan Republic Army (BRA) headed by Brahamdagh Bugti, grandson of Akbar Bugti. The BRA is declared as a terrorist organization by the government of Pakistan.

In a BBC interview, Bugti claimed that the Indian agency Research and Analysis Wing (RAW) was involved in funding and arming militants in Balochistan, but that it stopped doing so after its agent was arrested in Balochistan.

== Publications ==
- “The Role of Intelligence Agencies in Balochistan” (Paper presented at a two days national workshop held in National Defence University, Islamabad, July 17–18, 2012).
