= Talal Akbar Bugti =

Pakistani politician

- طلال اکبر بگٹی

President of Jamhoori Wattan Party
- In office 2006–2015
- Preceded by: Akbar Bugti
- Succeeded by: Shahzain Bugti

Personal details
- Born: March 17, 1952 Dera Bugti, Balochistan, Pakistan
- Died: April 27, 2015 (aged 63) Quetta, Balochistan, Pakistan
- Cause of death: Heart attack
- Party: Jamhoori Wattan Party
- Children: Shahzain Bugti (son) Gohram Bugti (son)
- Parent: Akbar Bugti (father)
- Education: Aitchison College; University of Punjab

Talal Akbar Bugti (Urdu: طلال اکبر بگٹی; March 17, 1952 – April 26, 2015) was a Pakistani politician and a Baloch tribal leader of the Bugti tribe in Balochistan. He served as the President of the Jamhoori Watan Party from 2006 until his death in 2015.

His son, Shahzain Bugti, is also a politician and is a member of the National Assembly of Pakistan.

== Early life and career ==
Bugti was born at Dera Bugti on 17 March 1952. Talal was the fourth child of Nawab Akbar Khan Bugti, with two elder sisters and an elder brother, Salim. Talal Bugti was married to Noorjahan and Kiran Ahmed. He had three sons, named Shah Zain Bugti, Gohram Bugti, and Mir Chakar Bugti from Noorjahan.

Bugti started his formal education in 1957 by joining Dera Bugti School. In 1958, he joined Quetta Grammar School and then in 1959 he joined Aitchison College, Lahore. After studying at Aitchison for six years, he completed his schooling from Quetta Grammar School. He then did a B.A. degree from the University of Punjab, Lahore.

In 2013, Bugti had placed a bounty on Pervez Musharraf, his daughter Ayla Raza, and business tycoon Hidayatullah Kheshgi. He offered PKR 2 billion (US$11 million) and 200 acres of farmland for anyone who killed Musharraf. The motive was mainly based on Bugti's accusation that Musharraf should be sentenced to death for the murder of his father and that he had posed a security threat because of his undermining of Pakistan's sovereignty and integrity through his policies.

== Death ==
He was admitted to the Combined Military Hospital (CMH) in Quetta following a heart attack and later died on 27 April 2015.

A large number of people gathered at the Bugti family house after hearing about the death of Mr. Bugti. The then Prime Minister Nawaz Sharif, the Pakistan Army chief, and other politicians from Balochistan also visited Bugti's house to pay their respects.
