= Baloch Republican Party =

- President: Brahumdagh Bugti
- General Secretary: Basheer Azeem
- Spokesperson: Sher Mohammad Bugti
- Founder: Brahumdagh Bugti
- Founded: 2008
- Banned: 24 October 2012
- Split from: JWP
- Student wing: Baloch Republican Students Organization
- Military wing: Baloch Republican Army
- Ideology: Baloch nationalism Left-wing nationalism Marxism; Republicanism; Secularism; Socialism
- Political position: Left-wing

Party flag

Website
- balochrepublicanparty.com

The Baloch Republican Party (Urdu: بلوچ ریپبلکن پارٹی) was an organization in Balochistan headed by Brahumdagh Bugti.

== Creation of BRP ==
BRP was formed in 2008 by Mr Bugti in Quetta Balochistan. Brahamdagh Khan Bugti or Brahumdagh Khan Bugti (Urdu: براہمدغ خان بگٹی or Balochi: براھُندگ ھان بگٹی) was the founder and leader of the Political Organisation Baloch Republican Party, a Baloch nationalist group which broke away from his uncle Talal Akbar Bugti's Jamhoori Watan Party in 2008. After the creation of BRP Pakistani Government Announced a list of Banned organizations on 24 October 2012 BRP was one of them. It was number 41 on the list.
