= PB-10 Dera Bugti =

Constituency of the Provincial Assembly of Balochistan, Pakistan

- Constituency for the Provincial Assembly of Balochistan
- Region: Dera Bugti District

Current constituency
- Party: Jamhoori Wattan Party
- Member: Gohram Bugti
- Created from: PB-24 (Dera Bugti)

PB-10 Dera Bugti (پی بی-10 ڈیرہ بگٹی) is a constituency of the Provincial Assembly of Balochistan.

== General elections 2024 ==
Provincial election 2024: PB-10 Dera Bugti
Party	Candidate	Votes	%	±%
PPP	Sarfraz Bugti	53,222	65.27	
JWP	Gohram Bugti	25,773	31.61	
Independent	Mir Aftab Ahmed Bugti	1,035	1.27	
Others	Others (twelve candidates)	1,508	1.85	
Turnout		84,201	61.49	
Total valid votes		81,538	96.84	
Rejected ballots		2,663	3.16	
Majority		27,449	33.66	
Registered electors		136,925		

== General elections 2013 ==
Contesting candidates	Party affiliation	Votes polled

== General elections 2008 ==
Contesting candidates	Party affiliation	Votes polled

== See also ==
- PB-9 Kohlu
- PB-11 Jhal Magsi
