= Abdul Raziq Bugti =

Pakistani politician

- Born: 1952; Balochistan, Pakistan
- Died: 27 July 2007 (aged 55); Quetta, Balochistan, Pakistan
- Occupation: Pakistani politician
- Awards: Sitara-i-Imtiaz

Abdul Raziq Bugti (1952 – 27 July 2007) was a Pakistani politician from Balochistan province.

Bugti was a vocal critic of Nawab Akbar Bugti and other nationalist militants. In recognition of his service, he was awarded the Sitara-i-Imtiaz.

On 27 July 2007, Bugti was assassinated by the Baloch Liberation Army (BLA), a terrorist group operating in the province.

== Personal life ==
He was born in the Masuri clan of the Bugti tribe in Sibi, Balochistan, Pakistan.

Bugti was married and had one daughter and two sons.

== Career ==
Bugti's political career started in 1968 by joining the Baloch Students Organization (BSO). He was elected as a president of the Baloch Students Organization in 1978. He had also served in Federal student union. In 1980, he went to exile in Afghanistan. In 2003, Bugti returned to Pakistan and joined the government. He joined the politics because he supported the then President Pervez Musharraf. Upon his arrival from Afghanistan, he also got into conflict with BSO and as a result he left BSO to join Progressive Youth Movement. Later on, he joined Pakistan People's Party (PPP) and served the role of provincial head and central secretary general of the Pakistan National Party. Bugti also formed National Awami Party Pakistan (NAPP) along with another veteran politician Ajmal Khattak. In his last years, he was serving as the media consultant of the chief minister and spokesman for the provincial government.

He was harsh critic of Nawab Akbar Bugti and other nationalist militants.

== Assassination ==
On 27 July 2007, about 4:15 PM; he was gunned down on Zarghon Road in Quetta. Police claims that Mr Bugti was returning to his office from PTV Quetta centre after talking about recent floods in Balochistan. After the attack, police rushed to shift his body to the civil hospital where the doctors declared him dead. He was assassinated at the same spot where several high-post government officials were attacked in the past; Justice Nawaz Marri, a Balochistan High Court judge and Nisar Hazara, former provincial minister, survived assassination.

The Baloch Liberation Army (BLA), a terrorist group, claimed responsibility for killing him.

Chief minister of Balochistan paid 2 million PKR to the Bugti's family. Pakistan's Worker Party protested against Raziq Bugti's killing. Protestors claims that Raziq Bugti was killed because he strongly opposed anti-Pakistan militant.
