= Mir Kohyar Khan Domki =

Pakistani politician

Sardar Mir Kohyar Khan Domki
- سردار میر کوہیار خان ڈومکی

Member of the Provincial Assembly of Balochistan
- Incumbent
- Assumed office 28 November 2024
- Preceded by: Mir Sarfraz Chakar Domki
- Constituency: PB-8 Sibi
- Majority: 35,716

Personal details
- Political party: PPP (2024-present)
- Parent: Mir Sarfraz Chakar Domki (father)
- Occupation: Politician,Tumandar

Sardar Mir Kohyar Khan Domki (Urdu: سردار میر کوہیار خان ڈومکی) is a Pakistani politician from Sibi who is a member of the Provincial Assembly of Balochistan. And Chief of Domki Tribe,He is the eldest son of Mir Sarfraz Chakar Domki, and succeeded his father as the Tumandar of the Domki Tribe.

== Political career ==
He was elected to the Provincial Assembly of Balochistan from PB-8 Sibi as a candidate of Pakistan People's Party (PPP) in a November 2024 by-election, which was called due to the death of his father, Mir Sarfraz Chakar Domki. He received 35,716 votes and defeated Mir Muhammad Asghar Khan Marri, an independent candidate.
