= PB-9 Kohlu =

Constituency of the Provincial Assembly of Balochistan, Pakistan

- Constituency for the Provincial Assembly of Balochistan
- Region: Kohlu District

Current constituency
- Party: Pakistan Tehreek-e-Insaf
- Member: Mir Naseebullah Khan
- Created from: PB-23 (Kohlu)

PB-9 Kohlu (پی بی-9 کوہلو) is a constituency of the Provincial Assembly of Balochistan.

== General elections 2024 ==
Provincial election 2024: PB-9 Kohlu
Party	Candidate	Votes	%	±%
PML(N)	Changez Khan Marri	7,544	32.38	
Independent	Mir Naseebullah Khan	6,277	26.94	
NP	Ghazan Marri	3,365	14.44	
Independent	Mir Liaqat Ali	2,652	11.38	
TLP	Mehrab Khan	1,247	5.35	
Others	Others (twenty six candidates)	2,212	9.51	
Turnout		25,080	32.60	
Total valid votes		23,297	92.89	
Rejected ballots		1,783	7.11	
Majority		1,267	5.44	
Registered electors		76,950		

== General elections 2013 ==
Contesting candidates	Party affiliation	Votes polled

== General elections 2008 ==
Contesting candidates	Party affiliation	Votes polled

== See also ==
- PB-8 Sibi
- PB-10 Dera Bugti
