= Taj Muhammad Jamali =

Pakistani politician (died 2009)

- میر تاج محمد جمالی

7th Chief Minister of Balochistan
- In office 17 November 1990 – 22 May 1993
- Preceded by: Humayun Khan Marri
- Succeeded by: Zulfiqar Ali Magsi

Personal details
- Died: 2 April 2009 Karachi, Pakistan
- Relations: Jamali family

Mir Taj Muhammad Jamali (Note: Urdu: میر تاج محمد جمالی) (died 2 April 2009) was a Pakistani politician who served as Balochistan chief minister from 17 November 1990 to 22 May 1993.

In April 2006, Taj Jamali offered to arrange a meeting between President Pervez Musharraf and a Loya Jirga (grand jirga) for peace in Balochistan.

Jamali died in Karachi on 2 April 2009; he had been under a doctor's care for heart problems. He was interred in his ancestral town of Rojhan Jamali in the district of Jaffarabad, Pakistan.

== Notes ==
Political offices
Preceded by Mir Humayun Khan Marri	Chief Minister of Balochistan; 1990 – 1993	Succeeded by Zulfikar Ali Magsi
