= Bugti =

Baloch tribe in Pakistan

بگٹی

Total population
- ~180,000 (2008)

Languages
- Balochi

Religion
- Islam

Related ethnic groups
- Baloch people

The Bugti (Balochi: بُگٹی; bugṭī) are a prominent Baloch tribe found in eastern Balochistan, Pakistan. Most of the members of the Bugti tribe live in the mountainous Dera Bugti region of Pakistan. The Bugti are divided into the Rahija, Kalpar, Nothani, Perozani, Masori, Mondarani and Marhita sub-tribes. Their neighbours to the north are the Marri, who were the Bugti's traditional enemies.

The current chief of the Bugti tribe is Mir Sarfraz Bugti, the Chief Minister of Balochistan. He was elected as the eight chief of the Bugti tribe on 29 December 2025.

== Notable people ==
- Akbar Bugti (born 12 July 1926 in Dera Bugti; died 26 August 2006) was the Tumandar (tribal chief) of the Bugti tribe, a seasoned politician, former Governor and Chief Minister of Balochistan, and founder of the Jamhoori Wattan Party.
- Brahumdagh Bugti, born in Dera Bugti, is the founder and leader of the Baloch Republican Party, a Baloch nationalist political organisation formed following his departure from the Jamhoori Wattan Party in 2008. He campaigns for Baloch rights and has been living in self-imposed exile in Switzerland.
- Shahzain Bugti (born 14 April 1970 in Dera Bugti) is a Pakistani politician who served as Member of the National Assembly from August 2018 to August 2023 and held positions including Special Assistant to the Prime Minister on Reconciliation and Harmony in Balochistan (2021–2022) and Federal Minister for Narcotics Control (2022–2023). He is the grandson of Akbar Bugti and leads the Jamhoori Wattan Party.
- Sarfraz Bugti, born in a village of Dera Bugti in Balochistan, is a Pakistani politician whose early education includes Lawrence College, Murree, and studies in Defence and Strategic Studies at Quaid-i-Azam University. His father was a tribal elder and political dissident, and Sarfraz himself has been involved in politics, including periods of arrest amid election activities.

== See also ==
- Marri-Bugti Country
- Bhagnari

== News and reports ==
- "بلوچستان کی مائیں اور بے بسی کی موت: زچگی کے دوران اموات میں خوفناک اضافہ", Sangat Mag, March 16, 2025. URL: (https://sangatmag.com/latest/44679)
- "ڈیرہ بگٹی، اقدامات کا فقدان، دورانِ زچگی خواتین کی شرح اموات میں "تشویشناک اضافہ, Daily Jang (E‑Paper), June 6, 2025. URL:https://e.jang.com.pk/detail/908495
- جمہوری روایات کی صبح ہم بھی دیکھیں گے (19 February 2022) URL https://jang.com.pk/news/1051958
- UrduPoint, Live News, May 31, 2025. URL: https://www.urdupoint.com/daily/livenews/2025-05-31/news-4445216.html)
- Jang Newspaper, (ڈیرہ بگٹی کے معذور افراد کو ملازمتوں سے محروم رکھا جارہا ہے،سہارا ویلفیئر/June/1/2025). URL: (https://jang.com.pk/news/1476731)
- The Pakistan Daily, "Activists from Islamabad‑Rawalpindi demand climate justice" (September 24, 2022). URL: (https://thepakistandaily.com/activists-from-islamabad-rawalpindi-demand-climate-justice/)
- Dawn, "(call-to-end-violence-against-transgender-people (April 1, 2022)". URLs:
- (https://www.dawn.com/news/1682782) "history-the-rise-and-fall-of-the-progressive-writers-movement", March 26, 2023 (https://www.dawn.com/news/1744128)

=== Literary and cultural analyses ===
- "Progressive Writers Movement (Taraqqi Pasand Tehreek)", Rekhta. URL: (https://www.rekhta.org/urdu-resources/progressive-writers-movement-taraqqi-pasand-tehreek)
- Minute Mirror, "The Progressive Writers Association in Pakistan" (October 19, 2021). URL: (https://minutemirror.com.pk/the-progressive-writers-association-in-pakistan-6593/)

Feature Stories (The Friday Times)

- "Museum Of Lost Voices: Women Confronting Patriarchal Violence Across Pakistan", The Friday Times, (date: March 6, 2025). URL: (https://www.thefridaytimes.com/06-Mar-2025/museum-of-lost-voices-women-confronting-patriarchal-violence-across-pakistan)
- "Balochistan’s Women Are Not Just Survivors—They Are Architects Of Change", The Friday Times, (date: February 24, 2025). URL: (https://www.thefridaytimes.com/24-Feb-2025/balochistan-s-women-are-not-just-survivors-they-are-architects-of-change)
- "Tribal Patriarchy And The Rise Of Women’s Politics In Balochistan", The Friday Times, (date: February 21, 2025). URL: (https://www.thefridaytimes.com/21-Feb-2025/tribal-patriarchy-and-the-rise-of-women-s-politics-in-balochistan)
- "Balochistan’s Literary Awakening: Books, Politics And The Quest For Identity", The Friday Times, (date: February 18, 2025). URL: (https://www.thefridaytimes.com/18-Feb-2025/balochistan-s-literary-awakening-books-politics-and-the-quest-for-identity)
- "The Maternal Health Catastrophe Of Dera Bugti", The Friday Times, (date: February 15, 2025). URL: (https://www.thefridaytimes.com/15-Feb-2025/the-maternal-health-catastrophe-of-dera-bugti)
- "Broken Schools, Doubtful Futures: The State of Education In Balochistan", The Friday Times, (date: March 9, 2025). URL: (https://www.thefridaytimes.com/09-Mar-2025/broken-schools-doubtful-futures-the-state-of-education-in-balochistan)
- "85% Dropout Rate: The Shocking State Of Education In Dera Bugti", The Friday Times, (date: April 18, 2025). URL: (https://www.thefridaytimes.com/18-Apr-2025/85-percent-dropout-rate-the-shocking-state-of-education-in-dera-bugti)
- "AI Dreams Vs Dark Classrooms: Balochistan’s Cruel Education Contrast", The Friday Times, (date: April 15, 2025). URL: (https://www.thefridaytimes.com/15-Apr-2025/of-promises-and-the-reality-of-balochistan-s-education)
- "How To Understand The Enduring Legacy Of Nawab Akbar Bugti", The Friday Times, (date: April 11, 2025). URL: (https://www.thefridaytimes.com/11-Apr-2025/how-to-understand-the-enduring-legacy-of-nawab-akbar-bugti)
- "Of Water, War And Hope: Balochistan’s Fight Against Scarcity And Neglect", The Friday Times, (date: March 22, 2025). URL: (https://www.thefridaytimes.com/22-Mar-2025/of-water-war-and-hope-balochistan-s-fight-against-scarcity-and-neglect)
- "Forgotten Custodians: The Untold Story Of The Bugti Tribe", The Friday Times, (date: March 16, 2025). URL: (https://www.thefridaytimes.com/16-Mar-2025/forgotten-custodians-the-untold-story-of-the-bugti-tribe)
- "From Uch To Sui And Beyond: The Bugti Tribe’s Struggle For Resource Justice", The Friday Times, (date: May 18, 2025). URL: (https://www.thefridaytimes.com/18-May-2025/from-uch-to-sui-and-beyond-the-bugti-tribe-s-struggle-for-resource-justice)
- "They Called It Honour, We Call It Murder", The Friday Times, (date: April 28, 2025). URL: (https://www.thefridaytimes.com/28-Apr-2025/they-called-it-honour-we-call-it-murder)
- "Of Faith And Fire: Pakistan’s Escalating Crisis Of Religious Extremism", The Friday Times, (date: April 23, 2025). URL: (https://www.thefridaytimes.com/23-Apr-2025/of-faith-and-fire-pakistan-s-escalating-crisis-of-religious-extremism)

The  Guardian (SL Guardian)

- "From Daylight Robbery To Legalised Plunder: The Tale Of Sui In Balochistan—My Hometown", SL Guardian (23/april/2025). URL: (https://slguardian.org/from-daylight-robbery-to-legalised-plunder-the-tale-of-sui-in-balochistan-my-hometown/)
- "Balochistan: The Resource Curse In The Shadow Of Superpowers", SL Guardian(18/april/2025). URL: (https://slguardian.org/balochistan-the-resource-curse-in-the-shadow-of-superpowers/)
- "BYC: A Voice For Balochistan’s Future", SL Guardian (april/6/2025). URL: (https://slguardian.org/byc-a-voice-for-balochistans-future/)
- "Balochistan: A New Turf For Global Powers’ Resource Capture", The High Asia (june/27/2025). URL: (https://thehighasia.com/balochistan-a-new-turf-for-global-powers-resource-capture/)
- “Nawab Akbar Bugti Legacy Of Baloch Autonomy”, SL Guardian (april/9/2025). URL: (https://slguardian.org/nawab-akbar-bugti-legacy-of-baloch-autonomy/)
- “Will The Baloch Now Only Live To Twenty?”, SL Guardian (july/3/2025). URL: (https://slguardian.org/will-the-baloch-now-only-live-to-twenty/)
- “Balochistan—The Engineered Illusion”, SL Guardian (June/18/2025). URL: (https://slguardian.org/balochistan-the-engineered-illusion/)

 Additional Articles

- Balochistan24.com, "The Cry Of The Bugti Women: Shadows Of Death In The Land Of Resources", January 24, 2025. URL: (https://balochistan24.com/en/2025/01/24/the-cry-of-the-bugti-women-shadows-of-death-in-the-land-of-resources/)
- Balochistan24.com, "Breaking Chains: Tribal Patriarchy And The Rise Of Feminist Resistance", February 23, 2025. URL: (https://balochistan24.com/en/2025/02/23/breaking-chains-tribal-patriarchy-and-the-rise-of-feminist-resistance/)
- The Daily Tribune, (or Tribune author Abdul Ghaffar Bugti), "Balochistan’s women are not just survivors—they are architects of change" (URL: (https://tribune.com.pk/author/12884/abdul-ghaffar-bugti)
- Dawn, "There are grievances other than terrorism" (April/6/2025). URL: (https://www.dawn.com/news/1902435)
- Nayadaur Urdu, "ڈیرہ بگٹی؛ سوئی میں بسنے والی خواتین اور بچیوں کی فریاد کون سنے گا؟" (November 8, 2024). URL: (https://urdu.nayadaur.tv/08-Nov-2024/27235?version=amp)
- Shafaqna Urdu, "نیا دور نیوز رپورٹ/ڈیرہ بگٹی؛ سوئی میں بسنے والی خواتین اور بچوں کی فریاد کون سنے گا؟" (nov/8/2024). URL: (https://ur.shafaqna.com/UR/365433/)
- Humsub.com.pk, "کیا کبھی غیرت کے نام کسی سردار کی بیٹی یا بیوی کا قتل ہوا ہے؟", (July 28, 2025). URL: (https://humsub.com.pk/n/7213/2025/07/28/abdul-ghaffar-bugti/)
- "کیا غریب کی کوئی شناخت ہوتی ہے؟", (July 18, 2024) URL: (https://www.humsub.com.pk/543437/abdul-ghaffar-bugti-dera-bugti-13/)
- "جی میں بگٹی ہوں", (7/1/2024) URL: (https://www.humsub.com.pk/535769/abdul-ghaffar-bugti-dera-bugti-3/)
- "ملٹری کالج کی یادیں", (30/12/2023) URL: (https://www.humsub.com.pk/535076/abdul-ghaffar-bugti-dera-bugti/)
- "بلوچستان کے سیاستدان اور قبائلی عمائدین", (29/12/2024) URL: (https://www.humsub.com.pk/573958/abdul-ghaffar-bugti-dera-bugti-27/)
- "بلوچستان میں کتابیں پڑھنے کا رواج اور سیاسی تحریکیں", (20/2/2025) URL: (https://www.humsub.com.pk/580809/abdul-ghaffar-bugti-dera-bugti-33/)
- "قبائلی علاقوں میں عورت دشمن رسم: ایک سنگین معاملہ", (12/11/2024) URL: (https://www.humsub.com.pk/569697/abdul-ghaffar-bugti-dera-bugti-24/)
- The Friday Times, "10 Days, 7 Murders: The Alarming Math Of Gender Violence In Pakistan", July 19, 2025. URL: (https://www.thefridaytimes.com/19-Jul-2025/10-days-7-murders-the-alarming-math-of-gender-violence-in-pakistan)
- The Friday Times, "Two Narratives, One Reality: How Balochistan Is Prevented From Speaking Its Mind", June 19, 2025. URL: (https://www.thefridaytimes.com/19-Jun-2025/two-narratives-one-reality-how-balochistan-is-prevented-from-speaking-its-mind)
- Humsub.com.pk, "مون سون کی بارشیں", (July 24, 2025). URL: (https://www.humsub.com.pk/n/6475/2025/07/24/abdul-ghaffar-bugti/)
- The Friday Times, "Theatre Of The Oppressed In The City Of Rulers", August 18, 2025. URL: (https://www.thefridaytimes.com/18-Aug-2025/theatre-of-the-oppressed-in-the-city-of-rulers)
- "Aurat March: We are the ones who will dismantle class divisions", *The Public Purview*, March 6, 2025. URL: (https://thepublicpurview.com/aurat-march-we-are-the-ones-who-will-dismantle-class-divisions)
