= Ali Mardan Khan Domki =

Pakistani politician

Mir Ali Mardan Khan Domki

Chief Minister of Balochistan
- Caretaker
- In office 18 August 2023 – 2 March 2024
- Governor: Abdul Wali Kakar
- Preceded by: Abdul Quddus Bizenjo
- Succeeded by: Sarfraz Bugti

District Nazim of Sibi District
- In office 2005–2009

Tehsil Nazim of Lehri Tehsil
- In office 2001–2005

Personal details
- Born: 13 October 1972 (age 53) Lehri, Balochistan, Pakistan
- Relations: Mir Dostain Khan Domki (brother)
- Parent: Mir Hazor Bakhsh Domki (father)
- Education: Allama Iqbal Open University

Ali Mardan Khan Domki (Urdu: علی مردان خان ڈومکی) is a political figure hailing from Balochistan, Pakistan. He was the Caretaker Chief Minister of Balochistan from 18 August 2023 to February 2024. The inauguration event took place at the Governor's House, with the oath being administered by Governor Abdul Wali Kakar.

Domki is from the Lehri region of Balochistan. He is the son of the late Mir Hazor Bakhsh Domki, a previous senator who served as a legislator between 1975 and 1977. His appointment as the interim Chief Minister was a result of a decision made by a parliamentary committee, subsequently receiving endorsement through an official directive from the provincial governor.
