= PB-8 Sibi =

Constituency of the Provincial Assembly of Balochistan, Pakistan

- Constituency for the Provincial Assembly of Balochistan
- Region: Sibi District

Current constituency
- Party: Pakistan People's Party
- Member: Mir Kohyar Khan Domki
- Created from: PB-21 (Sibi-I) & PB-22 (Sibi-II)

PB-8 Sibi (Urdu: پی بی-8 سبی) is a constituency of the Provincial Assembly of Balochistan.

== By-election 2024 ==
A by-election was held on 17 November 2024, due to the death of Mir Sarfraz Chakar Domki, the previous MPA from this seat. Mir Kohyar Khan Domki, his son, won the election with 36,610 votes.

By-election 2024: PB-8 Sibi
Party	Candidate	Votes	%	±%
PPP	Mir Kohyar Khan Domki	36,610	71.10	▲19.36
Independent	Mir Muhammad Asghar Khan Marri	12,108	23.52	▼20.29
Independent	Wali Muhammad (Note: Filed as a candidate of PTI, but Election Commission of Pakistan allowed him to contest as independent)	1,502	2.92	▲2.76
Others	Others (nineteen candidates)	1,269	2.47	
Turnout		52,077	44.83	▼4.29
Total valid votes		51,489	98.87	
Rejected ballots		588	1.13	
Majority		24,502	47.59	▲39.66
Registered electors		116,161		
PPP hold				

== General elections 2024 ==
Provincial elections were held on 8 February 2024. Mir Sarfraz Chakar Domki won the election with 28,173 votes.

Provincial election 2024: PB-8 Sibi
Party	Candidate	Votes	%	±%
PPP	Mir Sarfraz Chakar Domki	28,173	51.74	
Independent	Mir Muhammad Asghar Khan Marri	23,852	43.81	
Others	Others (twenty-two candidates)	2,422	4.45	
Turnout		55,998	49.12	
Total valid votes		54,447	97.23	
Rejected ballots		1,551	2.77	
Majority		4,321	7.93	
Registered electors		113,999		

== General elections 2013 ==
Contesting candidates	Party affiliation	Votes polled

== General elections 2008 ==
Contesting candidates	Party affiliation	Votes polled

== See also ==
- PB-7 Ziarat cum Harnai
- PB-9 Kohlu
