= Shahzain Bugti =

Pakistani politician

Nawab Shahzain Bugti

Minister of Narcotics Control
- In office 19 April 2022 – 9 August 2023
- President: Arif Alvi
- Prime Minister: Shehbaz Sharif
- Preceded by: Ijaz Ahmed Shah
- Succeeded by: Sarfraz Bugti (caretaker)

Special Assistant to the Prime Minister on Reconciliation and Harmony in Balochistan
- In office 7 July 2021 – 27 March 2022
- President: Arif Alvi
- Prime Minister: Imran Khan

Member of the National Assembly of Pakistan
- In office 13 August 2018 – 10 August 2023
- Constituency: NA-259 (Dera Bugti-cum-Kohlu-cum-Barkhan-cum-Sibbi-cum-Lehri)

Leader of JWP
- Incumbent
- Assumed office 2015
- Preceded by: Talal Akbar Bugti

Personal details
- Born: 14 April 1970 (age 55) Dera Bugti District, Balochistan Pakistan
- Party: JWP (2015-present)
- Parent: Talal Akbar Bugti (father)
- Relatives: Akbar Bugti (grandfather); Gohram Bugti (brother)

Shahzain Bugti is a Pakistani politician who had been a member of the National Assembly of Pakistan from August 2018 till August 2023. He served as Special Assistant to Prime Minister on Reconciliation and Harmony in Balochistan from 7 July 2021 to 27 March 2022.

== Early life and education ==
A grandson of Akbar Bugti and son of Talal Akbar Bugti, he earned a master's degree in political science from the University of Houston.

== Political career ==
He was elected to the National Assembly of Pakistan from Constituency NA-259 as a candidate of Jamhoori Wattan Party in the 2018 Pakistani general election.
