= Akbar Bugti =

Pakistani politician and tribal chief (1926–2006)

Nawab Akbar Bugti
- اکبر شہباز خان بُگٹی
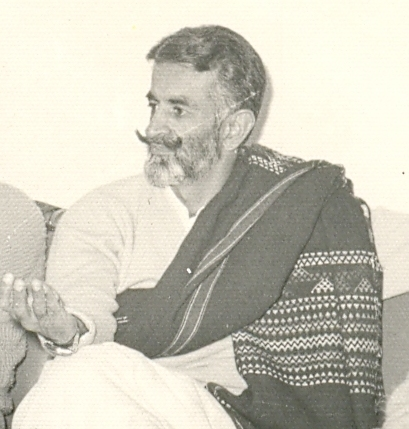
- Bugti in the 1970s

6th Chief Minister of Balochistan
- In office 4 February 1989 – 6 August 1990
- Governor: Muhammad Musa Khan
- Preceded by: Khuda Bakhsh Marri (acting)
- Succeeded by: Taj Muhammad Jamali

4th Governor of Balochistan
- In office 15 February 1973 – 22 November 1974
- Preceded by: Ghaus Bakhsh Bizenjo
- Succeeded by: Ahmad Yar Khan

Minister of State for Defence
- In office 19 December 1957 – 8 April 1958
- President: Iskander Mirza
- Prime Minister: Feroz Khan Noon

19th Tumandar of the Bugti Tribe
- Preceded by: Mehrab Khan Bugti
- Succeeded by: Mir Aali Khan Bugti

Leader of Jamhoori Watan Party
- In office 1989–2006
- Preceded by: Position established
- Succeeded by: Talal Akbar Bugti

Personal details
- Born: 12 July 1926 Barkhan, Balochistan, British India
- Died: 26 August 2006 (aged 80) Kohlu, Balochistan, Pakistan
- Party: Jamhoori Watan Party
- Spouse: 3 wives
- Children: List: Talal Akbar Bugti; Jameel Bugti; Salal Bugti; Saleem Bugti; Shahzwar Bugti; Rehan Bugti
- Relatives: List: Shahbaz Khan Bugti (grandfather); Brahumdagh Bugti (grandson); Shahzain Bugti (grandson); Gohram Bugti (grandson)

Akbar Shahbaz Khan Bugti (Urdu: اکبر شہباز خان بُگٹی; 12 July 1926 – 26 August 2006) was a Pakistani politician and the tumandar (tribal chief) of the Bugti tribe of Baloch people. Over a career spanning nearly five decades, he held several senior offices in Pakistan, including Minister of State for Defence in the cabinet of Prime Minister Feroz Khan Noon, Governor of Balochistan from 1973 to 1974, and Chief Minister of Balochistan from 1989 to 1990. He founded and led the Jamhoori Watan Party (JWP) from 1989 until his death.

In his later years, Bugti came into armed conflict with the government of President Pervez Musharraf over the political and economic status of Balochistan. He was killed on 26 August 2006 during a military operation in Kohlu district. In July 2012, an Anti-Terrorism Court issued arrest warrants for Musharraf and other senior officials in connection with the killing.

== Early life and education ==
Akbar Shahbaz Khan Bugti was born on 12 July 1926 in Barkhan, in what was then the Chief Commissioner's Province of Balochistan under British rule. He was the son of Nawab Mehrab Khan Bugti, chief of the Bugti tribe, and the grandson of Sir Shahbaz Khan Bugti. He received his early education at Karachi Grammar School and subsequently at Aitchison College in Lahore. Following his father's death, he succeeded as tumandar of the Bugti tribe.

== Early political career (1947–1972) ==
In May 1958, Bugti won a seat in the National Assembly of Pakistan by contesting a by-election, taking his place on the government benches as a member of the ruling coalition. He served as Minister of State for Defence in the federal cabinet under Prime Minister Feroz Khan Noon. The cabinet was dismissed in October 1958 when President Iskander Mirza declared martial law.

Bugti was arrested and convicted by a military tribunal in 1960, which disqualified him from holding public office. He did not contest the 1970 general elections.

== Governor of Balochistan (1973–1974) ==
In February 1973, Prime Minister Zulfikar Ali Bhutto dismissed the elected National Awami Party (NAP)-led provincial government of Balochistan. Bugti was appointed Governor of Balochistan on 15 February 1973, succeeding the ousted NAP governor Ghaus Bakhsh Bizenjo. The Pakistani army was simultaneously deployed in the province in an operation against Baloch insurgents.

As governor, Bugti did not oppose the military deployment in the province, a position that drew criticism from Baloch nationalist figures. In late 1974, he resigned from the governorship following disagreements with the Bhutto administration over how the situation in the province was being handled, and was succeeded by Ahmad Yar Khan.

== Return to politics and Chief Ministership (1988–1990) ==
After a prolonged absence from mainstream politics, Bugti joined the Balochistan National Alliance in 1988. Following elections held after the death of General Muhammad Zia-ul-Haq, he was elected Chief Minister of Balochistan on 4 February 1989. His provincial government clashed frequently with the federal government of Prime Minister Benazir Bhutto. In 1990, the provincial assembly was dissolved by the governor acting on the instructions of President Ghulam Ishaq Khan, ending Bugti's government on 6 August 1990.

In elections following the dissolution, Bugti stood under his newly formed Jamhoori Watan Party (JWP), which became the single largest party in Balochistan. He was subsequently elected to the National Assembly of Pakistan in 1993 and re-elected in 1997, representing the JWP.

== Confrontation with Musharraf and the 2004–2006 crisis ==
=== Charter of demands ===
In 2004, Bugti submitted a charter of demands to the government of President Pervez Musharraf, calling for greater provincial control over natural resources, a halt to further cantonment construction in Balochistan, and the release of political prisoners, among other points relating to provincial autonomy.

=== The Sui incident and subsequent unrest ===
In January 2005, Shazia Khalid, a physician employed by Pakistan Petroleum Limited at its Sui gas facility in Dera Bugti District, alleged that she had been raped by a Pakistani army officer. President Musharraf subsequently stated on national television that the accused officer was not guilty, a statement that drew public criticism and contributed to an escalation of tensions in Balochistan. Bugti demanded that the accused be brought to account. Members of the Bugti tribe attacked the Sui gas facility, disrupting natural gas supply to parts of Pakistan, and the Pakistani government deployed additional troops and police to restore order.

On 15 December 2005, the inspector general of the Frontier Corps and his deputy were wounded when their helicopter was fired upon in Balochistan. A ceasefire was subsequently reached but broke down without a political settlement.

=== March 2006 mine blast ===
In March 2006, a bus carrying wedding guests struck an anti-tank mine in Dera Bugti District, killing 28 people and injuring seven others. Abdul Samad Lasi, the District Coordination Officer, alleged that militants under Bugti's command had planted mines on roads in the area targeting security forces. The allegation was not independently verified at the time of reporting.

== Death ==
=== Military operation ===
On 26 August 2006, Akbar Bugti was killed near Kohlu, approximately 150 miles east of Quetta. Pakistani authorities reported that 21 soldiers and approximately 60 militia members were killed in the operation.

Inter-Services Public Relations (ISPR) stated that soldiers discovered a cave in the mountains near Dera Bugti and entered it to apprehend Bugti. According to the ISPR, a blast of undetermined origin caused the cave to collapse, killing all those inside, including the soldiers. The ISPR director general stated that no fighting or prior use of explosives preceded the collapse. Items reported recovered from the rubble included cash, satellite phones, documents, AK-47 rifles, and rockets.

Pakistani army engineers subsequently cleared the rubble. On 31 August 2006, Bugti's body was recovered and identified by his glasses and a wristwatch. The Pakistan military invited media representatives to the site after the operation.

=== Competing accounts ===
Brahumdagh Bugti, a grandson of Akbar Bugti, alleged that Balach Marri, then associated with the Baloch Liberation Army, was responsible for the cave collapse, claiming that a remote-controlled device caused the blast and that Marri was present outside the cave at the time. No independent investigation corroborated this account.

== Aftermath ==
=== Burial ===
Bugti was buried on 1 September 2006 in Dera Bugti, with a sealed coffin, next to the graves of his son and brother. His family, who had sought a public funeral in Quetta, did not attend.

=== Investigation and prosecution ===
In September 2010, Abdul Qayyum Khan Jatoi, a senior federal minister, publicly accused the army of involvement in Bugti's killing. He resigned from his ministerial post after his party asked him to account for his remarks.

On 11 July 2012, an anti-terrorism court in Sibi, Balochistan, issued arrest warrants for former military ruler Pervez Musharraf and several other senior officials in connection with Bugti's killing. Those named in the first information report filed by Balochistan Police included former Prime Minister Shaukat Aziz, former Interior Minister Aftab Ahmad Sherpao, former Governor of Balochistan Owais Ahmed Ghani, former Chief Minister of Balochistan Jam Mohammad Yousaf, former Provincial Home Minister Shoaib Nosherwani, and former Deputy Commissioner Abdul Samad Lasi. Musharraf was formally arrested by Balochistan Police on 13 June 2013 but was subsequently released on bail on health grounds.

== Personal life ==
Akbar Bugti had three wives and was the father of thirteen children, including six sons and seven daughters. His sons included Talal Bugti, Saleem Bugti, Rehan Bugti, Salal Bugti, Jameel Bugti, and Shahzwar Bugti. His grandchildren include Brahumdagh Bugti and Shahzain Bugti.

== Assessments ==
Assessments of Bugti's political significance have varied. A 2006 analysis published by the Institute of Peace and Conflict Studies noted that Bugti was not primarily a Baloch nationalist ideologue in the manner of Khair Bakhsh Marri or Ataullah Mengal, and that his actions throughout much of his career reflected the interests of his tribe more than a broader nationalist programme.

Al Jazeera reported in 2006 that to Pakistani military rulers and political rivals in Balochistan, Bugti was characterised as a feudal lord who prevented development from reaching ordinary tribespeople and who maintained a state-within-a-state, with private courts financed through gas field revenues. To members of the Bugti tribe and Baloch nationalists, he was described as a defender of the province against exploitation by federal authorities. Dawn described him at the time of his death as "maligned, but widely respected."

== See also ==
- Bugti
- Talal Akbar Bugti
- Brahumdagh Bugti
- Jamhoori Watan Party
- Insurgency in Balochistan
- Shazia Khalid

Political offices
| Preceded by Ghaus Bakhsh Bizenjo | Governor of Balochistan; 1973–1974 | Succeeded by Ahmad Yar Khan |
| Preceded by Khuda Bakhsh Marri (acting) | Chief Minister of Balochistan; 1989–1990 | Succeeded by Taj Muhammad Jamali |
