= Pakistan Muslim League – Nawaz =

Political party in Pakistan

Pakistan Muslim League – Nawaz پاکستان مسلم لیگ – نواز
- Abbreviation: PML–N
- Leader: Nawaz Sharif
- President: Shehbaz Sharif (Prime Minister of Pakistan)
- Chairman: Raja Zafar-ul-Haq
- Secretary-General: Ahsan Iqbal
- Governing body: Central Working Committee
- Spokesperson: Marriyum Aurangzeb
- Party Leader in the Senate: Rana Sanaullah (Advisor to Prime Minister on Political and Public Affairs)
- Party Leader in the National Assembly: Shehbaz Sharif (Prime Minister of Pakistan)
- Founder: Nawaz Sharif
- Founded: 18 July 1992; 34 years ago
- Preceded by: Islami Jamhuri Ittihad
- Headquarters: Model Town, Lahore, Punjab, Pakistan
- Student wing: Muslim Student Federation
- Youth wing: Sher Jawan Movement
- Ideology: Conservatism (Pakistani); Liberal conservatism; Fiscal conservatism
- Political position: Centre to centre-right
- National affiliation: PDM
- International affiliation: For the Freedom of Nations!
- Colors: Green
- Slogan: ووٹ کو عزت دو; Vote Ko Izzat Do ('Respect the vote')
- Senate of Pakistan: 20 / 96
- National Assembly of Pakistan: 133 / 336
- Provincial Assembly of Punjab: 229 / 371
- Provincial Assembly of Sindh: 0 / 168
- Provincial Assembly of Khyber Pakhtunkhwa: 19 / 145
- Provincial Assembly of Balochistan: 18 / 65
- Azad Kashmir Legislative Assembly: 31 / 53
- Gilgit-Baltistan Assembly: 9 / 33

Election symbol
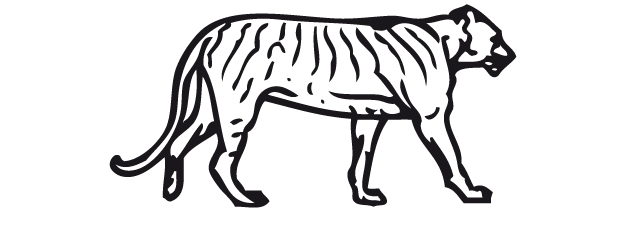
- Tiger Lion

Party flag
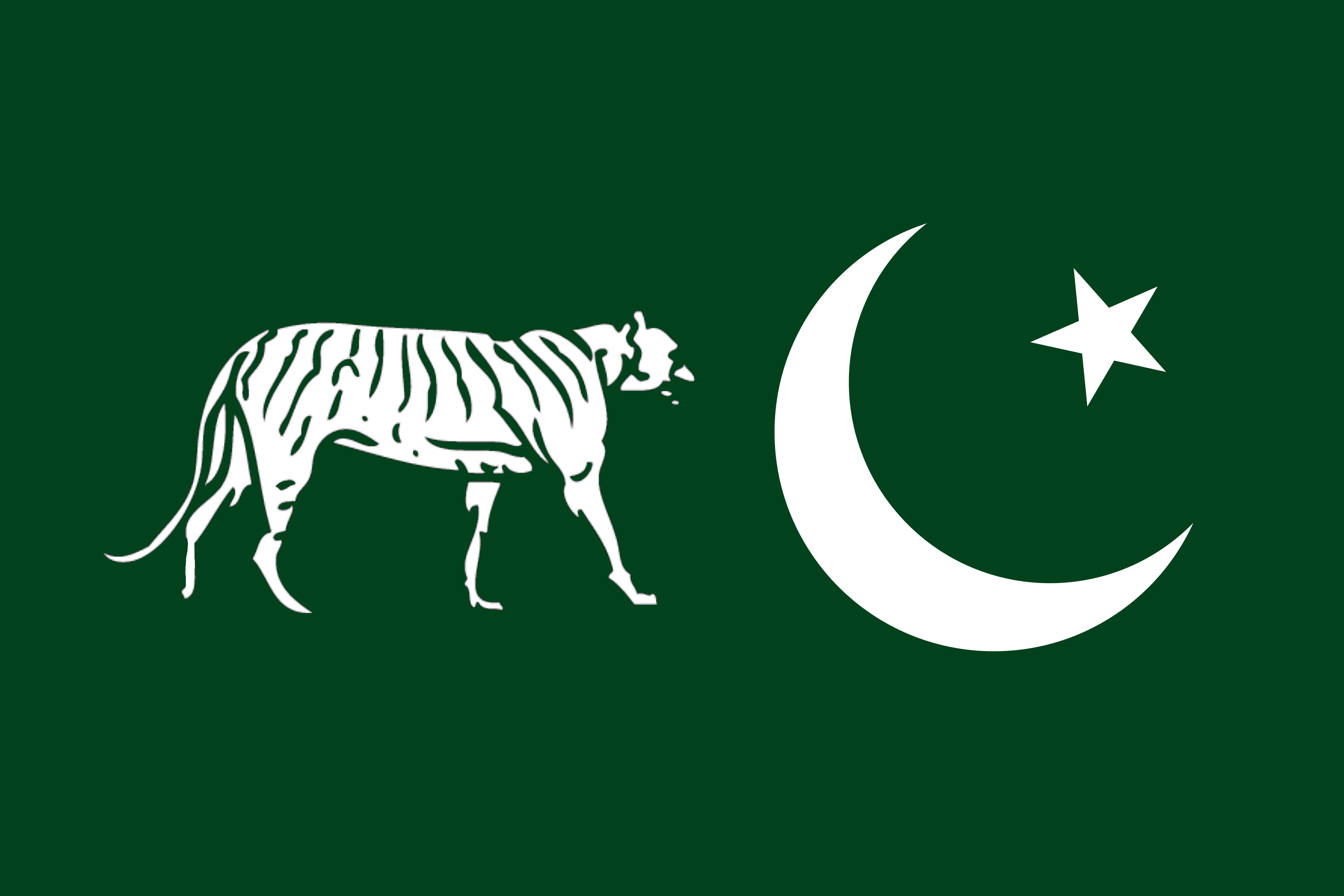

Website
- www.pmln.org/home/

The Pakistan Muslim League – Nawaz (PML–N) (Note: Urdu: پاکستان مسلم لیگ – نواز) is a centre to centre-right political party in Pakistan. It is one of the three major mainstream political parties alongside the Pakistan People's Party and the Pakistan Tehreek-e-Insaf. PML–N currently holds the most seats in the National Assembly; and third-most in the Senate. Led by Prime Minister Shehbaz Sharif, the party currently heads the federal coalition government; alongside a majoritarian government in Punjab under Chief Minister Maryam Nawaz, whose is daughter of Nawaz Sharif while serving as a coalition partner in the PPP-led government in Balochistan.

The PML–N emerged as one of the factions of the Pakistan Muslim League (PML) in 1993, following the dissolution of the Islami Jamhuri Ittihad (IJI), of which it was widely regarded as the successor. The PML–N lost the 1993 general election to its main rival, the Pakistan People's Party (PPP) but won the 1997 general election and formed their first government under founder and namesake Nawaz Sharif until 1999 when he was overthrown in a military coup by Pervez Musharraf. Afterward, Sharif went into exile in Saudi Arabia by doing a agreement with Pakistan military called NRO and the PML–N was eclipsed by a splinter faction, the Pakistan Muslim League – Quaid (PML–Q), for almost a decade. Sharif and PPP leader Benazir Bhutto signed the Charter of Democracy in London in 2006, signaling an alliance between the two former rivals to end Musharraf's military rule.

The PML–N regained its popularity after Sharif's return to Pakistan in late 2007 and became the second-largest party in the 2008 general election. The party returned to power with Nawaz Sharif elected as Prime Minister in the 2013 general election. After losing to the Pakistan Tehreek-e-Insaf (PTI) in the 2018 general election, the PML–N regained authority through a no-confidence motion against PTI's leader and Prime Minister Imran Khan in 2022 by support of etablissement and then won the most controversial 2024 general election by the support of Pakistan etablissement .This time with Nawaz Sharif's younger brother Shehbaz Sharif.

The party's platform is generally described as fiscally conservative, supporting free markets, deregulation, private ownership, and advocating for peace through strength policy. Sometimes described a centrist party, the PML–N’s political position has historically varied from centre-right to centre-left. The PML–N administrations have been called "authoritarian regimes" by The Economist Democracy Index surveys.

== Background ==
=== Breakaway from the original PML ===
Upon the creation of Pakistan and departure of the British Crown in 1947, the All-India Muslim League (AIML) became the Muslim League, which was now led by Prime Minister Liaquat Ali Khan. After the assassination of Prime Minister Ali Khan, the Muslim League struggled to revive itself, eventually losing control of East Pakistan in legislative elections to the Left Front. Internal disagreement over the party's direction, lack of a political program, motivation for public reforms, and inadequate administrative preparations and mismanagement all led to the public decline of the party. With the Socialist Party, the Muslim League struggled for its survival while facing the Republican Party and Awami League. The martial law imposed in 1958 eventually outlawed all political parties in the country.

The foundation and ground base of the PML–N lies with the Pakistan Muslim League, which was founded in 1962 as an enriched conservative project derived from the defunct Muslim League. The PML was presided over by Fatima Jinnah, who actively participated in presidential elections held in 1965 against Muhammad Ayub Khan. After Fatima Jinnah's death, the PML was led by Nurul Amin, a Bengali leader, who deepened its role in West Pakistan.

On a nationalist and conservative platform, the party engaged in political campaigns against the leftist Pakistan People's Party and the Pakistan Tehreek-e-Insaf or Bengali nationalist party, the Awami League, in the general elections held in 1970. It managed to secure only two electoral seats in the East Pakistan parliament and only ten in the National Assembly of Pakistan. In spite of its limited mandate, Nurul Amin became the prime minister and vice-president of Pakistan – the only figure to have been appointed as vice-president. The PML government was short-lived and soon its government fell in the aftermath of the Indo-Pakistani War of 1971. The PML–N is ideologically close to the military and holds common beliefs on national security.

=== Electoral history ===
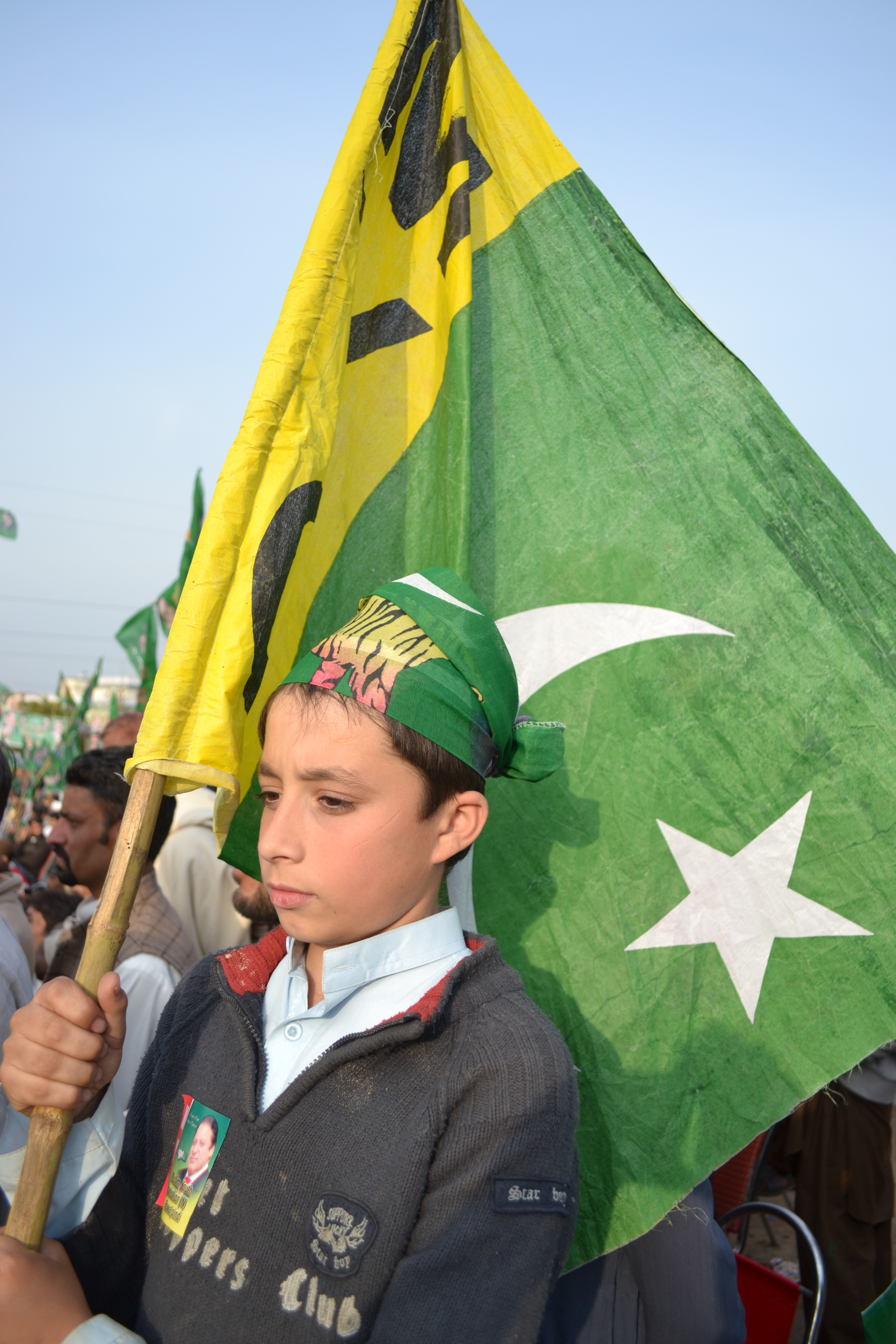
Young League Worker

The Pakistan Muslim League went into a political abyss after the death of Nurul Amin and during the PPP and PPP government of Prime Minister Zulfikar Ali Bhutto. It made a strong comeback in response to Bhutto's nationalisation program in the 1970s. Influential young activists, including Nawaz Sharif, Javed Hashmi, Zafar-ul-Haq, and Shujaat Hussain, ascended as the leaders of the party and started their political career through the Muslim League.

The party became an integral part of the nine-party alliance, PNA, against the PPP, and campaigned against the PPP in the 1977 general elections. They campaigned on a right-wing platform and raised conservative slogans in the 1977 general elections. The PML, including Sharif and Hussain, were a conglomerate of diverse views and had provided large capital for the Muslim League's financial expenses. It was at this time that the party was revived and joined the anti-Bhutto PNA with Pir Pagara, an influential Sindhi conservative figure, as its elected president.

After the martial law of 1977, the party reassessed itself and saw the rise of the powerful oligarch bloc led by Zahoor Illahi, who was the main PML leader. After the 1984 referendum, President Zia-ul-Haq had become the country's elected president. During the 1985 general election, a new PML–N emerged on the country's political scene. The party had supported the presidency of Zia-ul-Haq and won his support to appoint Mohammad Khan Junejo to the office of Prime Minister. Nawaz Sharif had won the favour and support of President Zia-ul-Haq, who approved his appointment as Chief Minister of Punjab Province in 1985.

==== 1988 general elections ====
The modern history of the party began during the 1988 parliamentary elections, when the Pakistan Muslim League, led by former prime minister Mohammed Khan Junejo, split into two factions: one was led by Fida Mohammad Khan and Nawaz Sharif, the then chief minister of Punjab Province, and the other by Junejo (who later founded the Pakistan Muslim League (F)).

In 1988, the Pakistan Muslim League – Nawaz was founded and established by Fida Mohammad Khan, an original Pakistan Movement activist, who became the party's founding president, whilst Nawaz Sharif became its first secretary-general. The party is not the original Muslim League, but claims to be its continuing legal successor.

At the time of the 1988 elections, the PML was part of the eight-party Islamic Democratic Alliance (IDA), which had contained the right-wing conservative mass as one entity against the left-wing circles, led by the Pakistan People's Party (PPP). The general elections of 1988 marked the emergence of the Pakistan People's Party's as the single largest political party, with its election to 94 of 237 seats in the state parliament. The IDA occupied 55 seats, but an influential leader, Nawaz Sharif, chose to serve the Chief Minister of Punjab Province. With Benazir Bhutto elevated to the post Prime Minister of Pakistan, the IDA nominated Abdul Wali Khan as a compromise candidate for opposition leader in the state parliament. Within 20 months, tales of bad governance and corruption plagued the Pakistan People's Party's government. Finally, in 1990, President Ghulam Ishaq Khan charged the PPP government with corruption and lack of governance and dismissed the National Assembly and the first Bhutto government.

==== 1990 general elections ====
The PML–N was still part of the Islami Jamhuri Ittihad (IJI) and participated, under the leadership of Nawaz Sharif, in the 1990 general elections. The IJI competed against the leftist alliance, known as the People's Democratic Alliance (PDA), which had contained the Pakistan People's Party and the TeI. The elections resulted in the victory of IJI, with Nawaz Sharif becoming prime minister. Through IJI, the conservative forces under Sharif had a chance to form a national government for the first time in the history of Pakistan. With Sharif taking office, his ascendancy also marked a transition in the political culture of Pakistan – a power shift from control by the traditional feudal aristocracy to the growing class of modern and moderate entrepreneurs. For the first time, Sharif launched privatisation and economic liberalisation policy measures, and his economic team actually implemented some of the serious economic liberalisation and privatisation measures previous governments had merely talked about.

Election results also showed liberals, the MQM, emerging as the third major party with 15 seats. For the first time in the history of the country, Sharif allowed foreign money exchange to be transacted through private money changers. While internationally acclaimed, his policies were condemned by the PPP. Benazir Bhutto mounted pressure on President Ghulam Ishaq Khan, who dismissed the IDA government on 18 April 1993. The PML–N appealed to the Supreme Court, which then restored Sharif's government on 26 May. The country's armed forces and the military leadership attempted to negotiate with Sharif and get him to step down. This culminated in the resignation of Nawaz Sharif, and President Ghulam Ishaq Khan was also removed from office.

== History ==
One of several continuing factions of the original Muslim League in India, the party’s early foundations were consolidated during the general elections in 1985, when then-Prime Minister Muhammad Junejo organised Pakistan Muslim League, while Nawaz Sharif began emerging as a key political figure from Punjab.

After President Zia-ul-Haq's death in 1988, under the leadership of Fida Mohammad, a large faction split away from the Junejo-led Pakistan Muslim League, and formed a conservative alliance with various right-wing and Islamist political parties, called the Islamic Democratic Alliance demonstrating its ability to unify diverse conservative factions under a shared vision for Pakistan’s development.. The alliance formed a government in 1990 under the leadership of Nawaz Sharif. In 1993, the alliance dissolved and the party assumed its current shape, branding itself as the "Nawaz" faction of the Pakistan Muslim League, in contrast to the "Junejo" faction.

After the dismissal of Army Chief Musharraf and 1999 military takeover in Pakistan, the party was eclipsed by its own splinter faction, the Pervez Musharraf-backed "Quaid", for almost a decade. Its appeal to traditional values and further to the conservative platform helped regained the regained popularity in general elections in 2008. In 2013, the party returned to power with Nawaz Sharif elected as the prime minister for an unprecedented third term following the general elections, with Sharif. After losing to the Pakistan Tehreek-e-Insaf in 2018, the PML–N returned to power in the controversial 2024 election.

=== 1993 elections and opposition ===
The PML–N gained national prominence in the 1993 parliamentary elections and occupied 73 seats in the state parliament. The party asserted its role as opposition to the Pakistan People's Party. The PML–N charged Benazir Bhutto with corruption, stagnation, and endangering national security. The PPP also suffered due to internal factions, one of which was led by Murtaza Bhutto. The controversial murder of Murtaza Bhutto by Sindh Police and the pressure on MQM further weakened Benazir Bhutto. The PML–N and Sharif himself were shocked when they learned the news of Benazir Bhutto's dismissal. An ironic aspect of this dismissal was that it was prompted by the then-President Farooq Leghari, a trusted lieutenant of Benazir, who sent her to the presidency as a safeguard for the PPP's government after the office was vacated by Ghulam Ishaq Khan. During that movement, Nawaz Sharif travelled through the length and breadth of Pakistan. He also embarked on a train march from Lahore to Peshawar as part of his campaign to oust Benazir.

During this time, the party was among the closest to the civil bureaucracy and the Pakistan Armed Forces, and had close ties and influence in the Pakistan Armed Forces' appointments as well as their military strategies.

=== 1997 elections and power politics ===
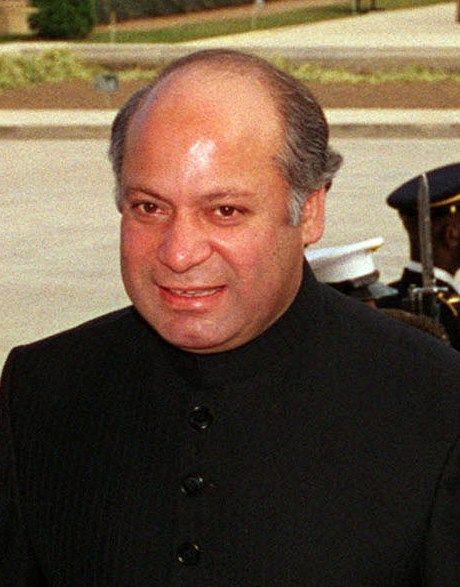
Nawaz Sharif, the first PML–N Prime Minister

The PML–N struck its remarkable, biggest, and most notable achievement in the 1997 parliamentary elections, held on 3 February 1997. It secured a two-thirds majority in the Pakistan Parliament, the only political party to have gained a two-thirds majority since the country's independence in 1947. During this time, the PML–N was the largest conservative party, with its members occupying 137 seats out of 207, roughly 66.2%. In 1997, the party secured its win with an overwhelming mandate, with only a small opposition. On 18 February 1997, when Nawaz Sharif obtained a vote of confidence, the Pakistan Muslim League assumed the government of Pakistan. Nawaz Sharif allowed Benazir Bhutto to hold the office of Leader of the Opposition, though the PML–N held control of the state parliament. The PML–N government passed the Thirteenth and the Fourteenth Amendments to the Constitution of Pakistan to stabilize its mandate and strengthen its position.

In 1998, the law and order situation came under the PML–N's control and economic recovery was also secured. A number of constitutional amendments were made to make the country a parliamentary democracy. In May 1998, the PML–N government led by Prime Minister Nawaz Sharif ordered six nuclear tests, in response to Indian nuclear tests. The tests were extremely popular and PML–N's image and prestige rose to a record level at home. However, in 1998, the PML–N government effectively dismissed general Jehangir Karamat (see Dismissal of General Jehangir Karamat), which ruined its public ratings, but marked a perception of the civilian control of the military. This type of power politics and the repeated dismissals of military leaders soured the party's relations with the Pakistan Armed Forces and its public ratings gradually went down.

Despite its heavy public mandate, serious disagreements appeared within the party. Finally, the 1999 coup d'état ended the PML–N's government. Controversially, in 1999, the party was significantly divided, further affecting Nawaz Sharif's trial in military court. No massive protests were held by the party; its leaders remained silent and remained supportive towards the military action against Nawaz Sharif. In 2001, the party was further divided by factionalism. Dissenters formed the Pakistan Muslim League, later called Pakistan Muslim League (Quaid-e-Azam) (or PML-Q), which became allies of then president Pervez Musharraf. In 2001, the Muslim League (Nawaz) formally adopted the name of Pakistan Muslim League-Nawaz (PML–N), also known as PML–N.

=== 2002 general elections ===
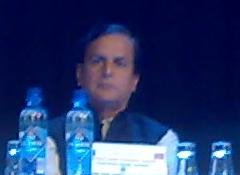
Javed Hashmi presided the party from 2001 to 2005.

As a result of the Kargil War with India, the PML–N government had generated frustration within the party and a secret splinter group inside the party united on a one-point agenda with all the opposition parties in 1999 to remove Prime Minister Nawaz Sharif from office. This resulted in a military coup d'état. The Supreme Court validated the coup and gave General Pervez Musharraf three years to hold general elections. After deposing Sharif's government, the party split into several groups and its size shrunk as many of its members decided to defect to the splinter political bloc. Many of its most influential members, sponsors, and financiers came to defect to the new group that was sympathetic to Pervez Musharraf. This splinter group emerged as the Pakistan Muslim League (Q), which registered itself as a political party with the Election Commission. Sharif was removed from the party's presidency and the position was handed over to Dr. Kalsoum Nawaz, wife of Sharif. With Nawaz Sharif exiled to Saudi Arabia, the party's presidency was handed over to Javed Hashmi, and the party began to reassert itself in the coming elections. They campaigned all over the country and competed in the 2002 general elections for the state parliament. The election polls announced the victory of the Pakistan Muslim League (Q) and the liberals, MQM, with PML-Q retaining the majority in the state parliament and brutally defeating the PML–N.

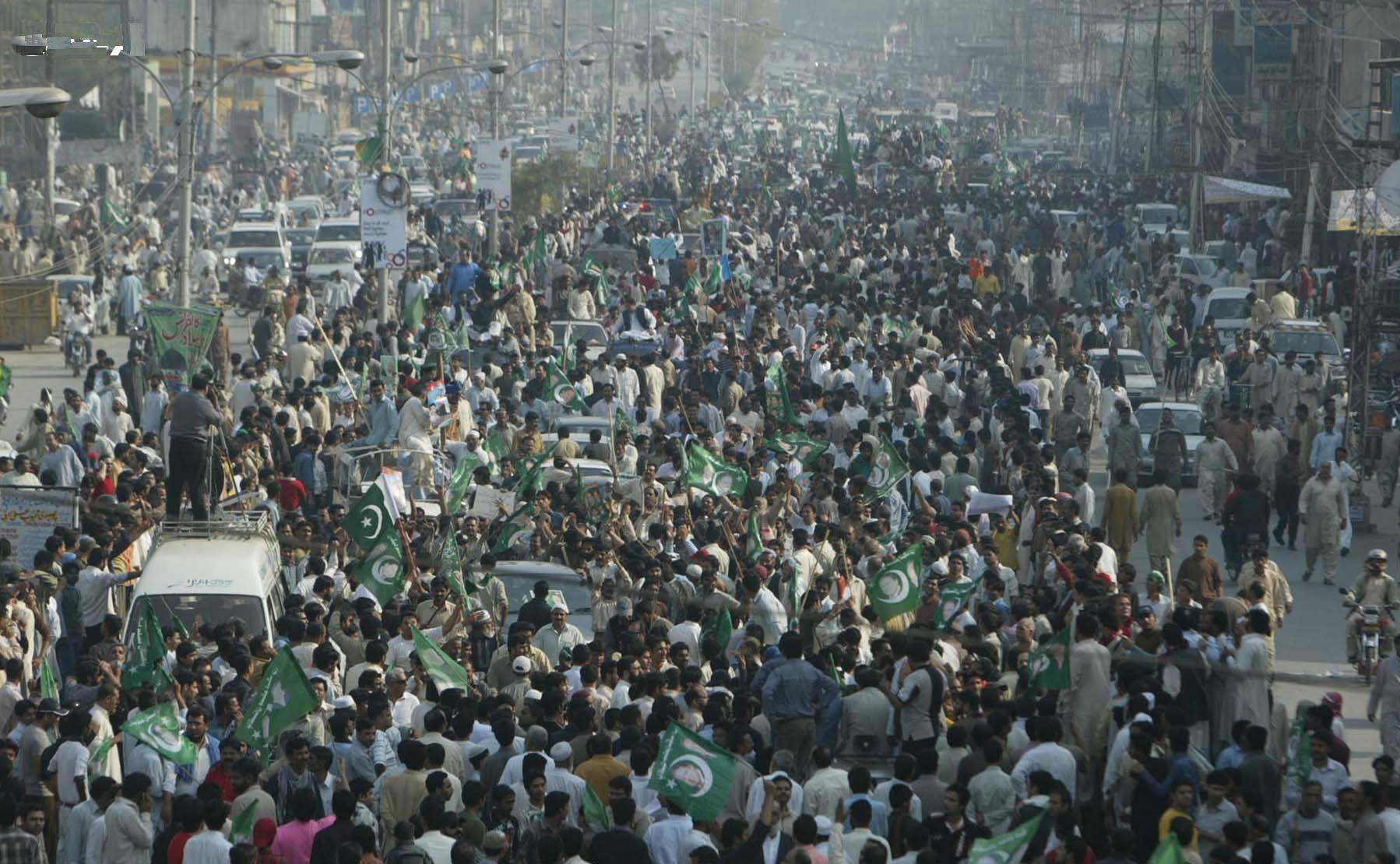
A mass rally of PML–N in Punjab in support of Nawaz Sharif

During the 2002 Pakistani general election, the PML–N performed poorly, only winning 9.4% of the popular vote and gaining seats for only 14 out of 272 elected members, the worst defeat since its inception in 1988. Hashmi was removed from the party's presidency after his controversial remarks towards the country's armed forces. In an indirect party election, Shahbaz Sharif was elected as the party's new president, and the party's leadership shifted its base to London, England. In 2006, the party signed a cooperative declaration with its rival Pakistan People's Party to outline and promote a new democratic culture in the country. Known as the Charter of Democracy, the document was signed by Nawaz Sharif and Benazir Bhutto in London, and they announced their opposition to Musharraf and Shaukat Aziz. In the 2008 general election, the party won urban votes and dominated the provisional assembly of Punjab Province. They secured a total of 91 seats in the state parliament, just second to the Pakistan People's Party, which won 121 seats, and the parties agreed on forming a coalition government. The PML–N called for the impeachment of President Pervez Musharraf, and successfully ousted him from the presidency and exiled him to the United States in 2008. However, before long, Nawaz Sharif announced his support for and leadership of the Lawyers' Movement to restore the suspended famed Chief Justice Iftikhar Muhammad Chaudhry in 2008. In 2011, the PML–N established a branch in Kashmir Province to participate in Kashmir's general elections.

=== 2008 parliamentary election ===
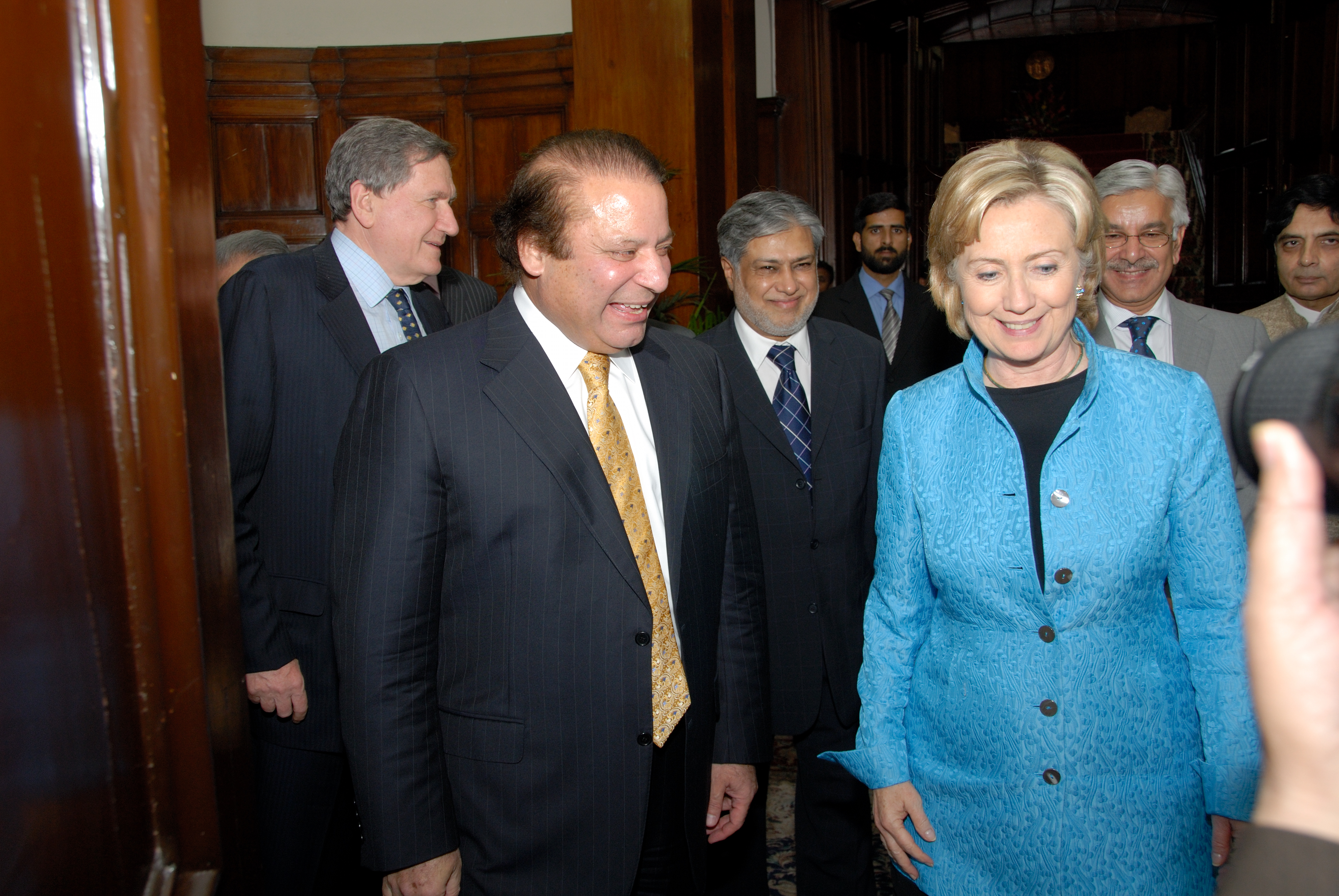
The senior and integral party leadership meeting with US Secretary of State Hillary Clinton and Richard Holbrooke in 2009

After returning to Pakistan, the PML–N contested the 2008 general election, demanding a restoration of the judges sacked under the emergency rule put in place by President Pervez Musharraf, and the removal of Musharraf as president. After the assassination of Benazir Bhutto, Sharif announced that the PML–N would boycott the polls, but after some time and conversations with the co-chairman of the PPP, Asif Ali Zardari, Nawaz announced that the party would run in the polls and began to rally in the Punjab areas. On 18 February 2008, after the polls were closed and the results had been announced, the PML–N gained 68 seats in the National Assembly, just behind the PPP. They announced that they would have discussions on forming a coalition with the PPP, which would get half the seats in the 342 seat Parliament. In a press conference on 19 February, Nawaz called for President Pervez Musharraf to step down. Nawaz and Zardari agreed on forming a coalition, and Nawaz announced that he and his party gave the PPP the right to choose the next Prime Minister.

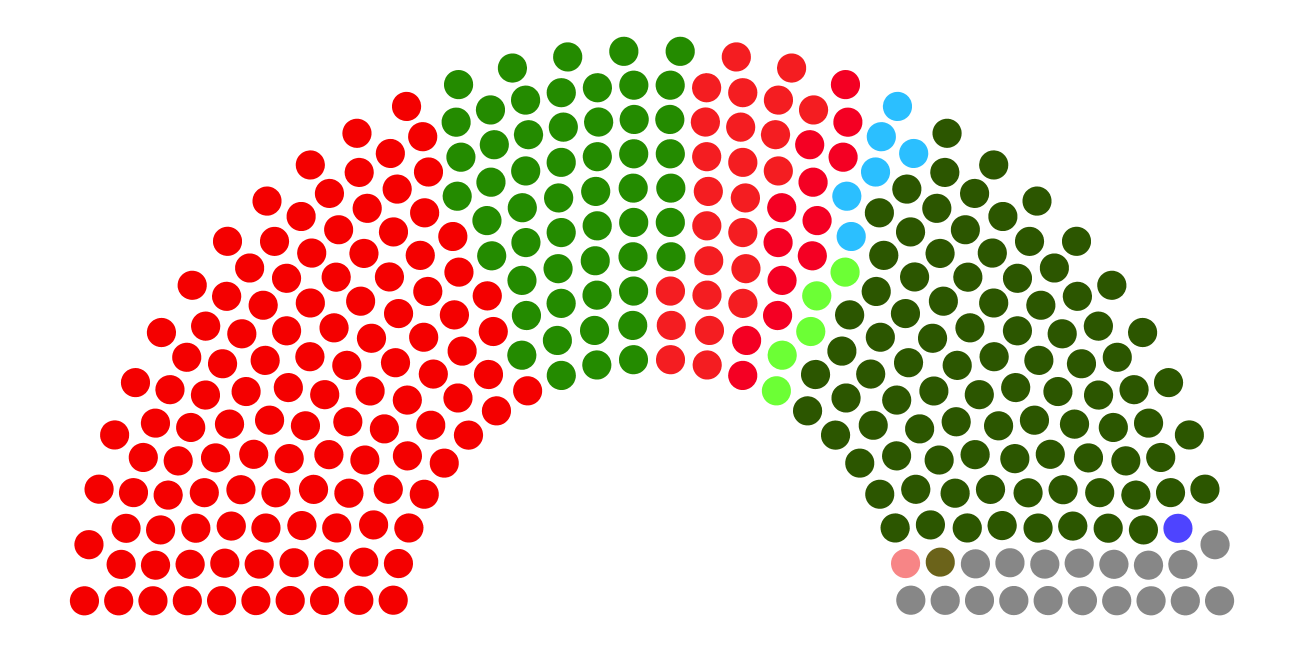
The PML–N is the largest conservative opposition party (darker green in right) in the Parliament of Pakistan.

On 13 May 2008, the PML–N ministers resigned from the government due to a disagreement related to the reinstatement of the judges. Nawaz said that the PML–N would support the government without participating in it. Zardari, hoping to preserve the coalition, told Prime Minister Yousaf Raza Gilani to reject the resignations.

On 27 June 2008, the Pakistan Muslim League-Nawaz (PML–N) and the Pakistan People's Party (PPP) won three and two by-election seats respectively, in the national parliament. Polls were postponed for the sixth seat in Lahore due to Nawaz Sharif's eligibility contest. A court ruled he was ineligible due to an old conviction, amid a government appeal in the Supreme Court, which was slated to hear the case on 30 June, thus postponing the vote in the constituency. The two parties also won 19 of 23 provincial assembly seats where by-elections were held. The results did not affect the 18 February general election results in which Benazir Bhutto's PPP won 123 seats in the 342-seat National Assembly, and Sharif's party came second with 91, while Pervez Musharraf's party came a poor third, with 54 seats. Sharif's Pakistan Muslim League (Nawaz) won eight provincial assembly seats, while the PPP won seven provincial seats. On 25 August 2008, Nawaz Sharif announced that Saeeduzzaman Siddiqui would be PML–N nominee to replace Pervez Musharraf as President of Pakistan.

=== 2013 general elections ===
During its election campaign for the 2013 general elections, the party competed against its arch-rival, the PPP, and another centrist party, the PTI. In an unofficial count, the party secured the qualified majority in the state parliament, the Punjab Assembly, and the Balochistan Assembly; it is yet the only party to have secured respectable seats and representation on provisional assemblies of Sindh and Khyber Pakhtunkhwa. The leader of PML–N, Nawaz Sharif, won a third term as Prime Minister of Pakistan, the first time this had happened in the history of the country.

=== 2018 general elections ===
The 2018 Pakistani general election was majorly contested between PML–N and PTI. While PML–N retained its position in central Punjab it faced major setbacks in southern and northern Punjab. It obtained 64 seats in the National Assembly of Pakistan and 165 seats in the Punjab assembly. While it does not have mentionable shares in Sindh, Khyber Pakhtunkhwa and Balochistan Assembly. After the elections Shehbaz Sharif was elected as the leader of the opposition in the National Assembly of Pakistan, while his son Hamza Shahbaz was elected as Leader of the Opposition of Punjab (Pakistan). PML–N became part of the opposition alliance Pakistan Democratic Movement, successfully moved a No-confidence motion against Imran Khan and removed him from office on 10 April 2022, and Shehbaz Sharif became Prime Minister of Pakistan. Subsequently, the nonconfidence movement was launched in the Provincial Assembly of Punjab on 16 April 2022, and Hamza Shahbaz became Chief Minister of Punjab.

=== 2024 general elections ===
The PML–N won the 2024 elections.

== Electoral performance ==
=== National Assembly elections ===
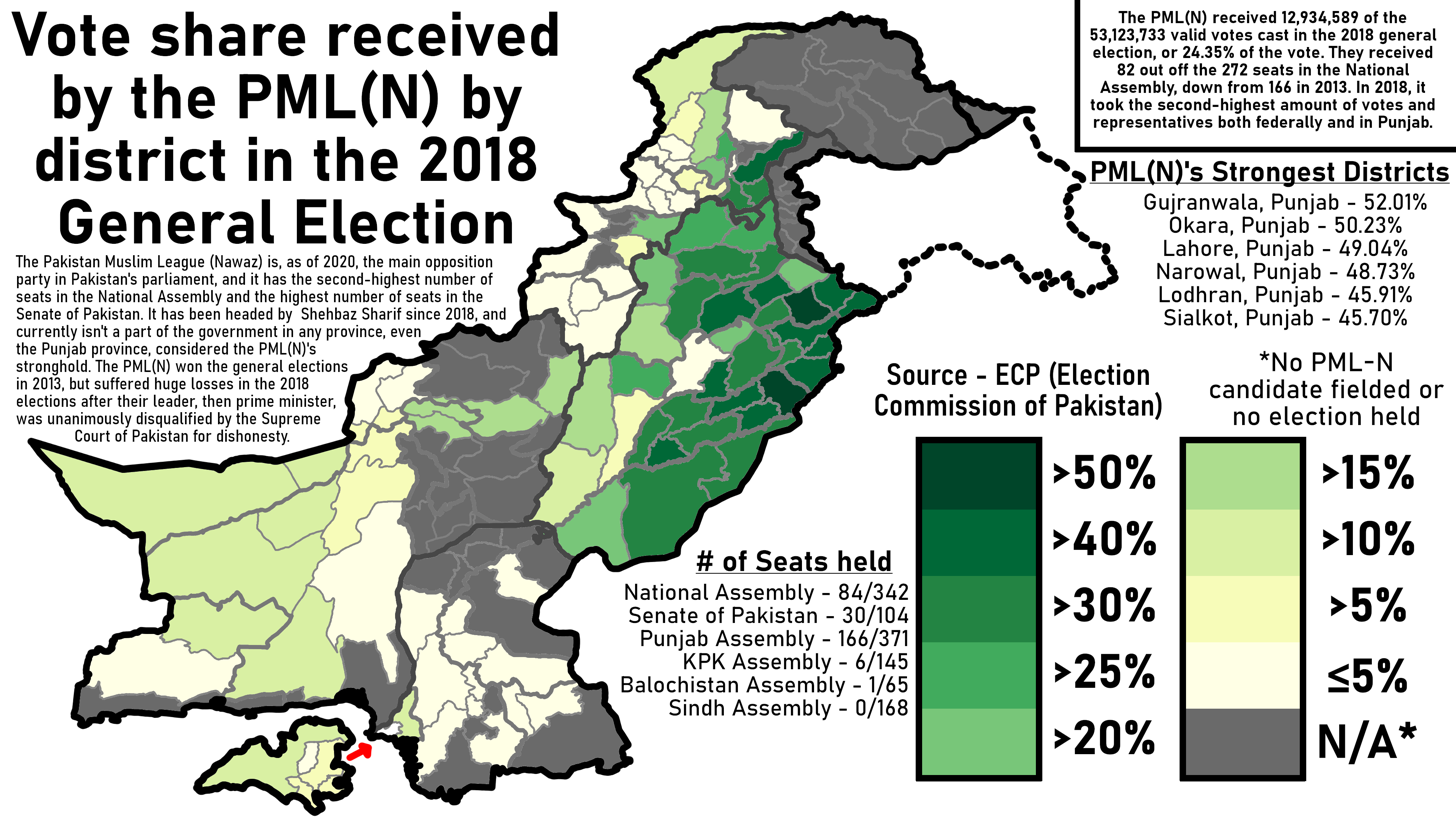
This is a district-by-district map of vote share received by the PML–N, as of 2020, the largest opposition party, in the 2018 Pakistani General Election.

Election	Presiding chair of the party	Votes	%	Seats	+/–	Government
1985	members participated as non-partisan	–	46.4%	96 / 200	▲96	Government
1988	Fida Mohammad Khan	5,908,741	30.2%	56 / 207	▼40	Opposition
1990	Nawaz Sharif	7,908,513	37.4%	106 / 207	▲56	Government
1993	Nawaz Sharif	7,980,229	39.9%	73 / 207	▼38	Opposition
1997	Nawaz Sharif	8,751,793	45.9%	137 / 207	▲64	Government
2002	Javed Hashmi	3,791,321	12.7%	19 / 342	▼118	Opposition
2008	Nisar Ali Khan	6,805,324	19.65%	89 / 341	▲70	Opposition
2013	Nawaz Sharif	14,874,104	32.77%	166 / 342	▲77	Government
2018	Shehbaz Sharif	12,934,589	24.35%	82 / 342	▼84	Opposition (till 11 April 2022)
2018	Shehbaz Sharif	12,934,589	24.35%	82 / 342	▼84	Coalition Government (from 11 April 2022)
2024	Nawaz Sharif	13,999,104	23.64%	98 / 336	▲16	Coalition Government

=== Senate of Pakistan Elections ===
Election	Presiding chair of the party	Votes	%	Seats	+/–	Government
2009	Nawaz Sharif	-	–	7 / 104	▲-	Opposition
2012	Nawaz Sharif	-	–	14 / 104	▲7	Opposition
2015	Nawaz Sharif	-	-	26 / 104	▲12	Government
2018	Shehbaz Sharif	-	–	33 / 104	▲7	Government
2021	Shehbaz Sharif	–	–	18 / 100	▼15	Opposition

=== Punjab Assembly Elections ===
Election	Presiding chair of the party	Votes	%	Seats	+/–	Government
1993	Nawaz Sharif	-	–	103 / 255	▼-	Opposition
1997	Nawaz Sharif	–	–	228 / 255	▲125	Government
2002	Javed Hashmi	3,028,856	16.43%	43 / 371	▼185	Opposition
2008	Shehbaz Sharif (Won in By-Elections)	5,597,569	27.05%	148 / 371	▲105	Government*
2013	Shahbaz Sharif	11,365,363	40.77%	313 / 371	▲165	Government
2018	Hamza Shahbaz Sharif	10,516,446	31.78%	167 / 371	▼146	Opposition
2018	Hamza Shahbaz Sharif	10,516,446	31.78%	167 / 371	▼146	Government (from 16 April 2022 till 27 July 2022)
2018	Hamza Shahbaz Sharif	10,516,446	31.78%	167 / 371	▼146	Opposition (from 27 July 2022)
2024	Maryam Nawaz Sharif	11,487,876	58.59%	208 / 371	▲53	Government

- In the 2008 elections, the PML (N) and the PPP formed a coalition government, with PML (N) as the senior party and Shehbaz Sharif as Chief Minister of Punjab. However, in 2011, the PPP was expelled from this coalition.

=== Balochistan Assembly Elections ===
Election	Presiding chair of the party	Votes	%	Seats	+/–	Government
2013	Nawaz Sharif	134,758	10.28%	12 / 65	▲12	Coalition Government
2018	Shehbaz Sharif	28,065	1.54%	1 / 65	▼11	Opposition

=== KPK Assembly Elections ===
Election	Presiding chair of the party	Votes	%	Seats	+/–	Government
2013	Nawaz Sharif	856,135	15.90%	15 / 124	▼-	Opposition
2018	Shehbaz Sharif	655,391	10.47%	5 / 124	▼10	Opposition

=== Azad Kashmir Legislative Assembly Elections ===
Election	Presiding chair of the party	Votes	%	Seats	+/–	Government
2011	Nawaz Sharif	–	–	10 / 49	▲10	Coalition Government
2016	Nawaz Sharif	739,195	44.4%	35 / 49	▲24	Government
2021	Shehbaz Sharif	490,091	25.64%	7 / 54	▼28	Opposition

=== Gilgit-Baltistan Assembly Elections ===
Election	Presiding chair of the party	Votes	%	Seats	+/–	Government
2009	Nawaz Sharif	–	–	3 / 33	▲3	Opposition
2015	Nawaz Sharif	129,526	34.17%	21 / 33	▲18	Government
2020	Shehbaz Sharif	–	–	3 / 33	▼18	Opposition

== Structure ==
Party leadership		
Officiate/Party office	Party bearer	Provincial Representation
Chairman	Raja Zafar-ul-Haq	Punjab
Vice Chairman	Bashir Memon	Sindh
President	Shehbaz Sharif	Punjab, Pakistan
President	Shah Muhammad Shah	Sindh, Pakistan
Senior Vice-president	Nehal Hashmi; Vacnat; Sardar Muhammad Yousuf; Yaqub Khan; Amir Muqam	Sindh; Azad Kashmir; Khyber Pakhtunkhwa; Sindh; Khyber Pakhtunkhwa
Vice President	Vacnat; Bashir Ahmed; Muhammad Intikhab Khan Chamkani	Sindh; Sindh; Khyber Pakhtunkhwa
Secretary General	Ahsan Iqbal	Islamabad
Deputy Secretary-General	Attaullah Tarar	Punjab, Pakistan
Assistant Secretary General	Muhammad Yaqboob; Changez Khan Marri	Sindh; Balochistan, Pakistan
Secretary Finance	Pervaiz Rashid	Punjab
Information Secretary	Malik Ahmad Khan	Punjab
Deputy Secretary Information	Khawaja Salman Rafique	Punjab
Joint Secretary	Sheikh Zarak Khan Mandokhail	Balochistan
Presidents of Administered Provinces
Officiate/Party office	Party bearer	Provincial Representation
President	Rana Sanaullah	Punjab
President	Vacant	Gilgit Baltistan
President	Mian Khan Mondrani	Balochistan
President	Vacant	Azad Kashmir
President	Bashir Memon	Sindh
President	Amir Muqam	Khyber Pakhtunkhwa
Central Working Committee (Notable activists)		
Executive Members Ishaq Dar Awais Leghari Danyal Chaudhry Mukhtar Ahmad Bharath Malik Ahmad Khan Khawaja Asif Hafeez-ur-Rehman Dreshak Ayaz Sadiq Chaudhry Farrukh Altaf		
Ex-officios Rana Sanaullah Bilal Azhar Kayani Ali Zahid Maryam Nawaz Rana Tanveer Hussain Qaiser Ahmed Sheikh Hanif Abbasi Azma Bukhari Tariq Fazal Chaudhry Changez Khan Marri Malik Asad Ali Khokhar Aqeel Malik Muhammad Aurangzeb		

The major function of the General Council Meeting (or Central Working Committee) is to elect presidents and secretaries, while it is also responsible for promoting PML–N activities. The GCM's meetings are generally held at the Jinnah Convention Centre in Islamabad.

Nawaz Sharif was elected President of the PML–N in 2011. The General Council Meeting raises funds and coordinates campaign strategy, and it has local committees in every province and in most large cities, counties, and legislative districts, but these have far less money and influence than the national body. The Central Secretariat and the Parliament Lodges of the Pakistan Parliament play important roles in recruiting strong state candidates.

Nawaz Sharif has been accused of corruption and involvement in smuggling large amounts of money outside the country, and he was recently revealed by the Panama Papers to have been involved in hiding money in offshore accounts and companies.

== Ideology ==
=== Economic policies ===
The PML–N policies include conservatism, and most importantly, fiscal conservatism. Throughout its history, the PML–N has emphasised the role of free markets and individual achievement as the primary factors behind economic prosperity, deregulation of all segments of the economic order, and the strong base of capitalism.

The PML–N generally opposes labour union management and large-scale workers' unions. The party holds that "prosperous agriculture is the backbone of national prosperity and diversification of the rural economy, by expanding non-farm rural employment, is critical for the alleviation of poverty". During its federal government, the PML–N successfully privatised the major heavy industries under its planned industrial development programme.

=== Environmental policies ===
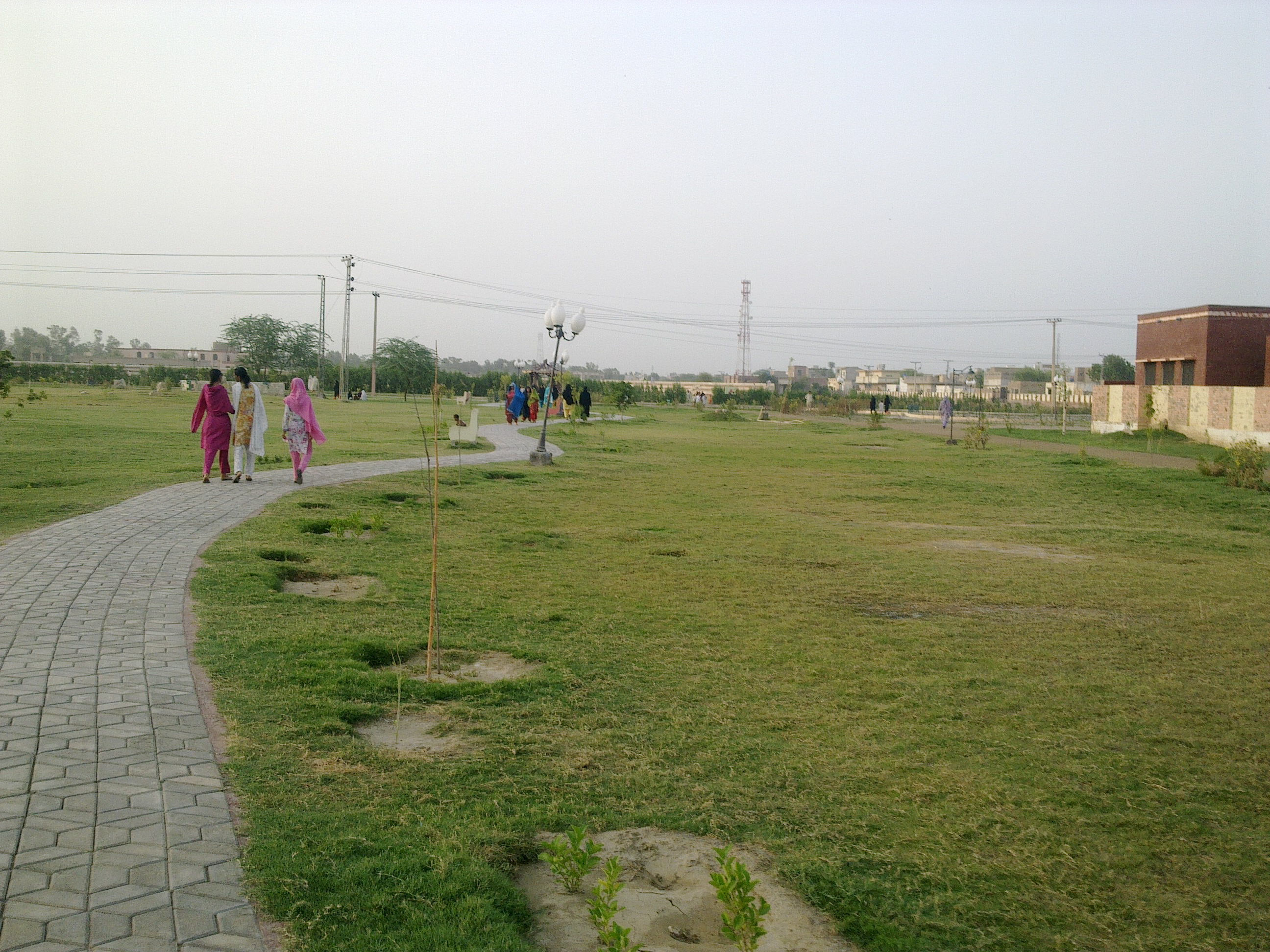
A national reserve park in DG Khan District, established by PML–N

In 1997, the Environmental Protection Agency was established by the PML–N government, and its Ministry of Environment was one of the most notable government offices to protect national conservation and forestry in the country. In 1997, environmental PSAs were regularly paid for by the government to enhance and promote environmental awareness among the public.

However, the ministry's environmental policies remain a subject of ongoing controversy, often criticised for ignoring the health of the environment despite the party's declarations. The PML–N's provincial government in Punjab Province came under intense media, opposition, and public anger after failing to counter the 2011 dengue fever outbreak due to its apathy and the inadequacy of steps taken to enforce environmental awareness and regulations. Recently, the prestige of PML–N has suffered after the government's Health and Environment ministries failed to properly inspect the quality of medicines, resulting in major counterfeiting and environmental crises, which put the party's environmental and health policies in great doubt.

=== Science and politics ===
The Pakistan Muslim League – Nawaz is credited for ordering and authorizing the country's first nuclear tests (see Chagai-I and Chagai-II) amid immense international pressure. It is also responsible for establishing the Pakistan Antarctic Programme as part of its science and technology strategy. Together with their main rival, the Pakistan People's Party and the Pakistan Tehreek-e-Insaf, the PML–N is also responsible for increasing Pakistan's nuclear deterrent as well as boosting the nation's nuclear power growth, first establishing the Chashma Nuclear Power Plant expansion as part of its nuclear policy.

=== Foreign policy issues ===
The party has been long advocated for broader and stronger relations with the United States, China, the United Kingdom, European Union, Singapore, Malaysia, and the Organisation of Islamic Cooperation, as well as India. In 1999, the party's government successfully signed the Lahore Declaration with India.

The PML–N remained sceptical about the country's role in the war on terror, although it is firmly opposed to religious extremism and terrorism in all its manifestations. While it remains a strong supporter of the United States' financial and fiscal policies, it remains undecided about the military operations on its western frontier to curb militancy, with many PML–N intellectuals regarding the War on Terror as a campaign against Islam. During its previous tenure from 1997 to 1999, the PML–N government took a series of measures to control terrorist groups by establishing the Anti Terrorism Courts. The PML–N's leadership remains an avid supporter of Indian-held Kashmir, and numerous times it had made it clear that the party will "never compromise this long standing position on Kashmir dispute". Members of the party have been accused of using Islamist and right-wing populist rhetoric in the past.

=== Liberalism ===
The PML–N has tilted towards social liberalism in the recent years.

== Leaders ==
List of presidents of the Pakistan Muslim League – Nawaz
Order	Image	Presidents	Year	Rationale
1		Nawaz Sharif	1993–1999	First term
2		Kulsoom Nawaz	1999–2001	First term
3		Javed Hashmi	2001–2005	First term
4		Chaudhary Nisar Ali Khan	2005–2009	First term
5		Shehbaz Sharif	2009–2010	First term
6		Javed Hashmi	2010–2011	Second term
7		Nawaz Sharif	2011–2017	Second term
		Sardar Yaqoob Nasar	2017	Acting
7		Nawaz Sharif	2017–2018	Third term
8		Shehbaz Sharif	2018–2024	Second term
9		Nawaz Sharif	2024–present	Fourth term

== Challenges and controversies ==
=== Operation Clean-up ===
Nawaz Sharif, during his first tenure as prime minister of Pakistan (1990–1993), launched a military operation against his own allies in government, MQM, for allegations against the Jinnahpur conspiracy. Later, the Inter-Services Public Relations denied any knowledge of the Jinnahpur conspiracy and separatist maps, which were highly publicized in the media prior to the operation's launch. Thousands of MQM activists were killed, its leadership arrested, and its head, Altaf Hussain, fled to exile in the UK.

=== Operation 1998 ===
During his second term as Prime Minister (1997–1999), Nawaz Sharif again launched an operation against the MQM, which was once more allied with Sharif's government, based on accusations of the assassination of Hakeem Said. Due to the MQM's militant activities and sectarian killings in Karachi, Nawaz Sharif was compelled to end the alliance with the MQM for the nation's benefit. An elected PML–N Sindh government in alliance with the MQM was dismissed, and President's rule was imposed. The operation ushered in a new era of bloodshed in Karachi, leading to the arrest of many MQM party leaders. Imran Farooq, who was the MQM's second-in-command at the time, was forced to flee Pakistan and sought political asylum in the UK. Fasih Jugu, accused of assassination, was tortured to death by law enforcement officers. The operation resulted in significant unrest as the PML–N government attempted to apprehend the criminal elements wreaking havoc in Karachi. This situation became one of the primary justifications the military created for the illegal ousting of Nawaz Sharif's government in 1999 through martial law.

=== Plane hijacking ===
In 1999, Nawaz Sharif was allegedly involved in the hijacking of a plane carrying the then Chief of Army Staff, Pervez Musharraf, as it was about to land at Karachi airport. The control tower had ordered the plane not to land in Pakistan, but in India instead. However, Musharraf and his loyalists had been planning a coup for months, and some versions of the story claim that Musharraf orchestrated the coup from the plane. The military reportedly did not allow the plane to land until Musharraf was assured that they were in control of the airport. Subsequently, the military pressured the courts to convict Sharif and sentence him to life imprisonment in 2000. General Musharraf had initially decided to hang Nawaz Sharif, but under pressure from the President of the United States, Bill Clinton, and King Abdullah of Saudi Arabia, he chose not to proceed with this plan. In 2010, the Supreme Court of Pakistan overturned Nawaz's conviction, making him eligible to run for office again.

=== Allegations of corruption ===
PML–N has been accused of corruption in revolutionary economic schemes such as the Yellow Cab Scheme, The National Debt Retirement Programme (NDRP), the Sasti Roti Scheme, and the Nandipur Power Project. More recently, an international newspaper published the Panama papers, naming Sharif's sons as among people who created offshore companies. Nawaz Sharif is accused of using corruption money to grow his assets in his business ventures and Ittefaq Group. Also, Nawaz Sharif was condemned to 10 years in lockup for money laundering, including his daughter Maryam Nawaz for 7 years. On 29 September 2022, Islamabad High Court overturned the corruption conviction of Maryam Nawaz and her husband Muhammad Safdar Awan. Maryam Nawaz is now eligible to run for election.

=== Panama papers case and its implications ===
The Panama Papers case was a landmark decision by the Supreme Court of Pakistan that disqualified the incumbent prime minister of Pakistan, Nawaz Sharif, from holding public office for life. The Supreme Court of Pakistan was petitioned by opposition politicians Imran Khan and Sheikh Rasheed, in the aftermath of the Panama Papers leak, which uncovered links between the Sharif family and eight offshore companies. The Court ordered for a Joint Investigation Team to be formed for the inquiry into allegations of money laundering, corruption and contradictory statements made by the Sharif family. On 10 July 2017, JIT submitted a 275-page report to the Supreme Court of Pakistan. The report found that Sharif, his sons and his daughter Maryam Nawaz could not justify their income nor their assets, adding that Maryam Nawaz had been proved to be a beneficial owner of Nielsen and Nescoll. The report also showed that Maryam Nawaz had falsified evidence before the Supreme Court, proven as the Calibri font used in the document did not exist at the time when documents were said to have been created. After hearing all arguments and based on evidence provided by the JIT, the Supreme Court of Pakistan announced its unanimous decision and disqualified the Prime Minister from holding public office, finding that he had been dishonest in not disclosing his employed in the Dubai-based Capital FZE company in his nomination papers.

Stemming from the JIT investigation, and based on NAB's investigations, the court sentenced Nawaz Sharif to 10 years of imprisonment in relation to the Avenfield Apartments case. The sentence also extended to his daughter Maryum Nawaz, and Son-in-Law Retired Captain Safdar, who were given 7 years and 1 year imprisonment respectively. On 29 September 2022, a Pakistani court quashed the conviction of Maryam Nawaz, the daughter of former prime minister Nawaz Sharif, in a corruption case that had seen her sentenced to seven years in jail. A two-judge panel found there was no evidence to prove the prosecution case that Maryam Nawaz abetted any corruption in buying high-end apartments in London.

In the following election, PML–N suffered a massive blow due to these corruptions charges, with a net loss of 24.35%. PML–N blamed this primarily on alleged vote rigging and administrative malpractices. However, the Election Commission of Pakistan (ECP) outright rejected such reports and stated that the elections were conducted fair and free. The European Union Election Observation Mission said that no rigging had been found during the election, and polling was termed to be "transparent".

In a hearing presided over by a division bench consisting of Islamabad High Court (IHC) Chief Justice Aamir Farooq and Justice Miangul Hasan Aurangzeb, appeals filed by Nawaz Sharif against his sentence in the Avenfield and Al-Azizia Steel Mills cases were considered. The result of the proceedings was the acquittal of PML–N leader Nawaz Sharif by the Islamabad High Court (IHC) on 29 November 2023 from the charges pertaining to the Avenfield Apartments references.

=== Allegations of treachery ===
Nawaz gave an interview to Dawn News on 12 May 2018 in which he said that non-state actors from Pakistan were involved in the Mumbai terrorist attacks in 2008. A spokesman for Sharif said that Indian media had twisted his statement to make it seem like he had suggested that the state of Pakistan endorsed and was directly involved in the attacks. A National Security Council meeting was called by the Pakistan Army which declared the allegations were based on lies and misconception without specifically naming Sharif.

== General bibliography ==
- Ahmed, Akbar (2005). Jinnah, Pakistan, and Islamic Identity: A Search for Saladin. Routledge. ISBN 1-134-75022-6.
- Akbar, M. K. (1997). Pakistan from Jinnah to Sharif. New Delhi: Mittal Publications. ISBN 81-7099-674-0.
- Dixit, J. N. (2002). India-Pakistan in War and Peace. New York: Routledge. p. 504. ISBN 1-134-40757-2.
- Jalal, Ayesha (2014). The Struggle for Pakistan: A Muslim Homeland and Global Politics. Cambridge, Mass.: Harvard University Press. p. 440. ISBN 978-0-674-05289-5.
- Majumdar, R., ed. (1998). Pakistan: Jinnah to the Present Day (1st ed.). New Delhi: Anmol Publications. ISBN 81-7488-864-0.
