= Jamhoori Wattan Party =

Jamhoori Wattan Party جمہوری وطن پارٹی
- Abbreviation: JWP
- Leader: Shahzain Bugti
- Founder: Akbar Bugti
- Founded: 1989
- Youth wing: Jamhoori Youth Wing
- Ideology: Republicanism; Baloch nationalism
- National affiliation: Pakistan Oppressed Nations Movement; Pakistan Democratic Movement
- Colors: Light coral
- Senate: 0 / 104
- National Assembly: 0 / 266
- Balochistan Assembly: 0 / 51

Election symbol
- Wheel

Party flag

Website
- Official website

The Jamhoori Wattan Party (Urdu: جمہوری وطن پارٹی, lit. 'Republican National Party') is a political party in Balochistan, Pakistan.

The party has split into two factions, with the non-dominant one led by Baramdagh Bugti splitting off to form the Baloch Republican Party.

== Electoral history ==
In the legislative elections held on 20 October 2002, the party won 0.3% of the popular vote and one out of 272 elected members.

In the legislative elections held on 25 July 2018, the party won 0.7% of the popular vote and one out of 272 elected members.

In the legislative elections held on 8 February 2024, the party failed to win any elected seats in the National Assembly.

=== National Assembly ===
Election	Results	Note
2002	1 / 272	0.3% of country wide votes
2018	1 / 272	0.7% of country wide votes

== See also ==
- Nawab Akbar Khan Bugti
- Balochistan National Party (Awami)
- Balochistan National Party (Mengal)
- Baloch Council of North America
