= Insurgency in Balochistan =

Insurgency in Iran and Pakistan

- Part of the spillover of the Afghan conflict and the insurgency in Khyber Pakhtunkhwa
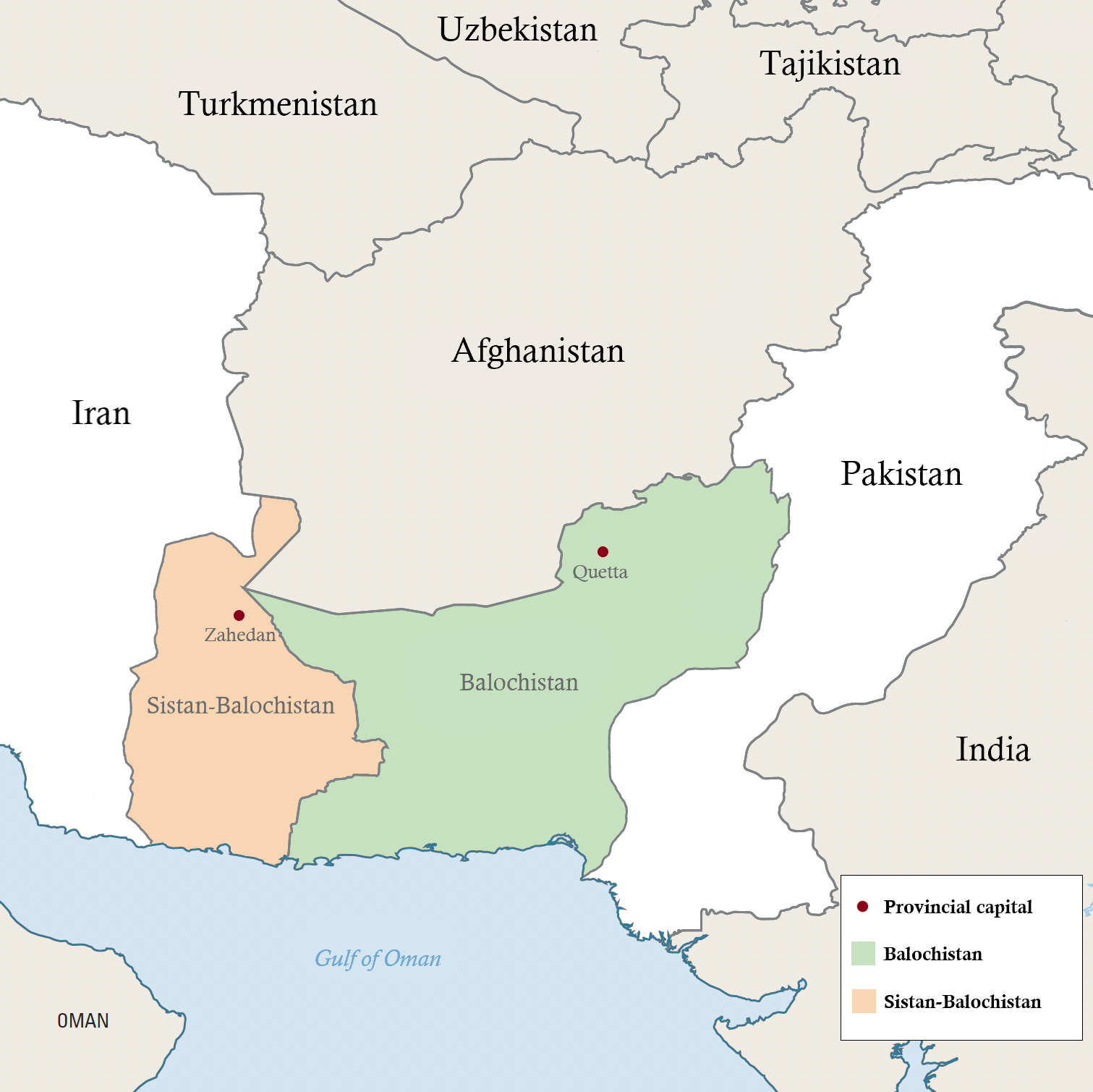
- Map of the Balochistan region, with Iranian-administered Sistan and Baluchestan in orange, and Pakistani-administered Balochistan in green
Date	July 1948 – present (78 years and 4 months) Main phases: Baloch conflict phases: 1948–50; 1958–60; 1963–69; 1973–77; 2003–present
Location	Pakistani Balochistan, Sistan and Baluchestan
Status	Ongoing

Belligerents
Pakistan Iran	Baloch separatist groups Jihadist groups Islamic State-affiliated groups

Commanders and leaders
List: (Pakistan) Liaquat Ali Khan X; (Pakistan) Khawaja Nazimuddin; (Pakistan) Muhammad Ali Bogra; (Pakistan) Iskander Mirza; (Pakistan) Ayub Khan; (Pakistan) Yahya Khan; (Pakistan) Zulfikar Ali Bhutto (executed); (Pakistan) Zia-ul-Haq #; (Pakistan) Benazir Bhutto; (Pakistan) Nawaz Sharif; (Pakistan) Pervez Musharraf; (Pakistan) Yousaf Raza Gillani; (Pakistan) Imran Khan; (Pakistan) Shehbaz Sharif; Shafiq Mengal; (Pahlavi Iran) Mohammad Reza Pahlavi - Exiled; (Pahlavi Iran) Fazlollah Zahedi; (Pahlavi Iran) Amir-Abbas Hoveyda (executed); (Pahlavi Iran) Gholam Reza Azhari; (Iran) Ruhollah Khomeini; (Iran) Ali Khamenei X; (Iran) Mojtaba Khamenei; (Iran) Akbar Hashemi Rafsanjani; (Iran) Mohammad Khatami; (Iran) Mahmoud Ahmadinejad; (Iran) Hassan Rouhani; (Iran) Ebrahim Raisi #; (Iran) Mohammad Mokhber; (Iran) Masoud Pezeshkian	List: Bashir Zaib; Hyrbyair Marri; Allah Nazar Baloch; Brahumdagh Bugti; Mehran Marri; Javed Mengal; Karim Khan (POW); Nauroz Khan (POW); Ahmad of Kalat (surrendered); Balach Marri †; Khair Bakhsh Marri (POW); Ataullah Mengal (POW); Ghaus Bakhsh Bizenjo (POW); Aslam Baloch †; Abdul Nabi Bangulzai; Haji Wali Kalati (surrendered); Gulzar Imam (surrendered); Sarfraz Bangulzai (surrendered); Sufyan Kurd †; Akbar Bugti †; Basit Zehri †; Haroon Baloch †; Salman Hammal †; Abdul Wahab Zehri †; Rahman Gul X; Riaz Basra †; Malik Ishaq †; Akram Lahori (executed); Ghulam Rasool Shah †; Muhammad Dhahir Baluch; Mir Daad Shah †; Abdolmalek Rigi (executed); Abu Hafs al-Balochi †; Jalil Qanbarzehi †; Salahuddin Farooqui †; Amir Naroui †; Hashem Nokri †

Units involved
Pakistan; Pakistan Armed Forces; Pakistan Army; Pakistan Air Force; Pakistan Air Force; Civil Armed Forces; Frontier Corps; North Balochistan Corps; South Balochistan Corps; Pakistan Coast Guards; Federal Constabulary; Balochistan Police; Alleged irregulars: Baloch Musallah Defa Tanzeem; Tehreek-e-Nafaz-e-Aman Balochistan; Iran (1979–present); Iranian Armed Forces; Artesh (since 1979); IRGC; Ground Forces; Aerospace Force; Navy; Basij; Alleged proxies: Liwa Fatemiyoun; Police Command; Pahlavi Iran (1948–1979); Imperial Iranian Army	Baloch Raaji Aajoi Sangar (2018–present); Balochistan Liberation Army; Majeed Brigade; Fateh Squad; Hammal Maritime Defence Force; Qazi Aero Hive Rangers; Zephyr Intelligence, Research, and Analysis Bureau; Special Tactical Operations Squad; Balochistan Liberation Front; Saddo Operational Battalion; Baloch Republican Guards; Sindhudesh Revolutionary Army; People's Fighters Front (2025–present); Jaish ul-Adl (2013–2025); Nasr Movement (2010–2025); Pada Baloch Movement (2017–2025); Mohammad Rasul Allah Group (1970s–2025); Former belligerents: Lashkar-e-Balochistan (inactive); Baloch Peshmerga; Balochistan Waja Army; Balochistan Bunyad Parast Army; Balochistan National Liberation Army; Baloch Republican Party–Azad; Balochistan United Army; Balochistan Liberation United Front (2009–2010); Baloch Students Organization; BSO (Azad); BSO (Awami); Baloch Nationalist Army (2022–2023); United Baloch Army (2013–2022); Baloch Republican Army (2006–2022); Jihadist factions: Ansar Al-Furqan (since 2013); Tehrik-i-Taliban Pakistan (since 2007); Islamic State (Note: See Baloch Nationalist–Islamic State conflict); ISKP (since 2015); ISPP (since 2019); Former belligerents: Harakat Ansar (2012–2013); Hizbul-Furqan (2012–2013); Jundallah (2003–2012); Sipah-e-Sahaba (1985–2018); Lashkar-e-Jhangvi (1996–2024); Jaish ul-Adl (2013–2024)

Strength
Pakistan: 145,000; Iran: Unknown	BLA: 600 (2020); 3,000 (2025) Jaish al-Adl: 500–600; Jundallah: 500–2,000 (until 2011)

Casualties and losses
Pakistan: 1973–1977: 3,300 killed; 2000–2026: 3,325 killed; Iran: 2005–2010: 164 killed (security forces and civilians)	1973–1977: 5,300 killed; 2000–2026: 4,028 killed; 6,046 surrendered; 5,662 arrested
- c. 6,000+ civilians (1973–1977), 4,608 civilians (2000–2019) and 497 non-specified killed in Pakistan (2000–2019); c. 140,000 displaced (2004–2005); (China) 3 Chinese civilians killed (as of 2015); 4 kidnapped (as of 2015); 5 oil tankers damaged (as of 2015)

An ongoing insurgency in Pakistan's Balochistan province and Iran's Sistan and Baluchestan province is fought between Baloch nationalist separatist groups, Islamist militants, and the governments of Pakistan and Iran. The conflict is rooted in long-standing grievances over political marginalisation, economic underdevelopment, enforced disappearances, and the control of Balochistan's natural resources. The insurgency has involved guerrilla warfare, bombings, assassinations, and attacks on military personnel, infrastructure, and civilians. Sectarian violence, particularly against the Shia Hazara community in Pakistan, has also contributed to instability in the region. Human rights organisations have accused both militant groups and state security forces of abuses during the conflict.

In Pakistan, Baloch nationalist insurgencies have occurred intermittently since 1948, shortly after the accession of the Khanate of Kalat to Pakistan. Further insurgencies took place in 1958–1960, 1963–1969, and 1973–1977, with the current insurgency beginning in 2003. The conflict intensified after the killing of Baloch nationalist leader Akbar Bugti in 2006, leading to increased militant activity against Pakistani forces. Separatist groups have demanded greater political autonomy or independence for Balochistan, while the Pakistani government has accused foreign states, notably India and Afghanistan, of supporting Baloch rebels.

== Militant groups involved ==
Several militant groups have operated during the insurgency, including the Balochistan Liberation Army (BLA), Balochistan Liberation Front (BLF), and Baloch Republican Army (BRA), alongside Islamist and sectarian organisations such as Lashkar-e-Jhangvi and the Islamic State – Khorasan Province. The BLA, the most prominent separatist organisation, has been designated a terrorist organisation by Pakistan, the United Kingdom, and the United States. While the insurgency in Pakistan largely remained low-intensity compared to other regional conflicts, violence has continued through attacks on security forces, laborers, journalists, and ethnic settlers.

In Iran, insurgent activity has mainly been concentrated in Sistan and Baluchestan province, where Sunni Baloch militant groups such as Jundallah and Jaysh al-Adl have carried out attacks against Iranian security forces. Iran has accused Pakistan-based militants of using cross-border sanctuaries, while Pakistan and Iran have periodically cooperated in broader security operations. Despite military campaigns and reconciliation initiatives by both governments, the insurgency remains unresolved and continues to affect regional security and development.

=== Pakistan-allied Afghan groups ===
As of 2026, nearly 2,000 former Afghan police officers and soldiers were recruited by Pakistan in Balochistan. They were reportedly introduced to local police stations in their assigned areas to fight insurgency. According to Radio Free Liberty, the Pakistan government even mulled the idea to raise civilian led "lashkars." They were hired for a salary of roughly 40,000 Pakistani rupees a month ($145). Jamiat Ulema-e-Islam (JUI) has been critical of the idea. Fazal-ur-Rehman opposed it while Fazal Qadir Mandokhail confirmed presence of thousands at the Balochistan provincial assembly in August 2026. Abdul Qahar Wadan, provincial president of the Pakhtunkhwa Milli Awami Party (PkMAP) also confirmed presence of thousands of "arbakiyan" or militants.

== Area of dispute ==
Historical Balochistan covers the southern part of the Iranian Sistan and Baluchestan province in the west, the Pakistani province of Balochistan in the east, and part of Afghanistan's Helmand Province in the northwest, while the Gulf of Oman forms its southern border. Mountains and desert make up much of the region's terrain. A majority of Baloch inhabit the region of Balochistan that falls within Pakistan's borders.

Geographically, Balochistan is the largest province of Pakistan (comprising 44% of the country's total area), but it is the least developed and least inhabited, comprising only 5% of the total population. Sunni Islam is the predominant religion throughout the Balochistan region.

Stuart Notholt, in his Atlas of Ethnic Conflict, describes the unrest in Balochistan as a "nationalist/self-determination conflict".

== History ==
=== Background ===
The origins of the secessionist movement are believed to have started around the uncertainty regarding the Khanate of Kalat, established in 1666 by Mir Ahmad. The Khanate of Kalat occupied territory around the center of present-day Balochistan province. Under Nasir I of Kalat in 1758, who accepted the Afghan paramountcy, the boundaries of Kalat stretched up to Dera Ghazi Khan in the east and Bandar Abbas in the west.

==== Invasion of Kalat ====
During the British invasion of Kalat in November 1839, the Khan was killed in action. Afterwards, British influence in the region gradually grew. Under British rule Kalat was one of the four princely states (Makran, Las Bela, Kharan, and Kalat) within the province of modern-day Balochistan. In 1869, the British political agent Robert Groves Sandeman mediated a dispute between the Khan of Kalat and the Sardars of Balochistan, and established British primacy in the region. The tribal areas of Marri, Bugti, Khetran, and Chaghi were brought under the direct administration of a British Agent, eventually becoming the Chief Commissioner's Province of Balochistan. Las Bela and Kharan were declared Special Areas with a different political system. The remaining areas of Sarawan, Jhalawan, Kacchi, and Makran were retained as the Khanate of Kalat, supervised by a Political Agent of Kalat.

==== Under British Rule ====
In the 20th century, the educated Baloch middle class harboured hopes of their independence from British colonial rule. They formed a nationalist movement Anjuman-i-Ittehad-i-Balochistan in 1931. One of their first campaigns was to fight for the accession of Azam Jan as the Khan of Kalat and for a constitutional government to be established under him. They successfully established Azam Jan as the Khan, but he then sided with the Sardars and forsook the Anjuman. His successor Mir Ahmad Yar Khan was more sympathetic to the Anjuman but averse to upsetting his relations with the British. The Anujman transformed into the Kalat State National Party (KSNP) and continued to fight for independence from the British. The Khanate declared the party illegal in 1939 and exiled its active leaders and activists. This paved the way for the formation in 1939 of new political parties: the Balochistan Muslim League (allied to the Muslim League) and the Anjuman-i-Watan (allied to the Indian National Congress). Led by Abdul Samad Khan Achakzai, the Anjuman-i-Watan opposed the partition of India and wanted a united India after the country gained independence from Britain.

During British rule, Balochistan was under the rule of a Chief Commissioner and did not have the same status as other provinces of British India. The Muslim League under Muhammad Ali Jinnah in the period 1927–1947 strived to introduce reforms in Balochistan to bring it on par with other provinces of British India.

==== Negotiations, The Independence Movement and Partition of India ====
During the time of the Indian independence movement, public opinion in Balochistan—at least in Quetta and other small towns in northern Balochistan—overwhelmingly favoured Pakistan. The pro-India Congress (which drew support from Hindus and some Muslims), sensing that geographic and demographic compulsions would not allow the province's inclusion into the newly Independent India, began to encourage separatist elements in Balochistan, and other Muslim-majority provinces such as North-West Frontier Province(NWFP).

The Khan of Kalat lent great support to the Pakistan Movement but also desired to declare independence. Lord Mountbatten, however, made it clear that with the lapse of British paramountcy, the princely states would have to join either India or Pakistan, keeping in mind their geographic and demographic compulsions.

On 19 July, Mountbatten called a Round Table Conference meeting between representatives of the State of Kalat and Government of Pakistan. Mountbatten discussed with them the status of Kalat State. The representatives of Kalat argued that Kalat, as per the treaty of 1876, was an independent and sovereign state and not an Indian state. Mountbatten accepted this position for the purpose of negotiations, although Kalat had always been a princely state. Thus, Mountbatten confined the topic of discussion to the leased areas of Quetta, Nushki, Nasirabad, and Bolan. He explained that Pakistan rejected Kalat's claims that these areas should be returned to Kalat.

Pakistan's position was that it would inherit all treaty obligations incurred by India to foreign states. Kalat argued that the leases clearly stated that the other party besides Kalat was the British Government alone. Kalat argued that it was a personal agreement and there was no provision that the leases to the British would be inherited by others. Therefore, since the agreement was between Kalat and the British Government, Pakistan could not be the latter's successor party.

Pakistan did not agree that the agreement was personal as personal agreements by nature implied that only a particular person was involved. Mountbatten also said that according to international law, treaties such as the one being discussed were inherited by successors and not invalidated by a transfer of power. Mountbatten also suggested that in case there was no agreement the matter could be put before an Arbitral Tribunal.

Kalat wished to have further discussions on the matter. Kalat argued that should the leased areas vote between joining Kalat and joining Pakistan, the vote would favour the former. Pakistan disagreed on this point. Kalat also expressed a deep desire to remain on friendly terms with Pakistan and stated that it understood that Jinnah, who was anxious for a correct decision, wanted more time to study the issues between Kalat and Pakistan. Mountbatten, however, suggested that Jinnah not be brought into the discussions.

At Mountbatten's insistence, Kalat and Pakistan signed a standstill agreement, which stipulated that both parties would as soon as possible discuss their relationship concerning Defence and External Affairs. According to Article I:

The Government of Pakistan agrees that Kalat is an independent State, being quite different in status from other States of India.

However, Article IV stated:

...a standstill agreement will be made between Pakistan and Kalat by which Pakistan shall stand committed to all the responsibilities agreements signed by Kalat and the British Government from 1839 to 1947 and by this, Pakistan shall be the legal, constitutional and political successor of the British.

Through this agreement, the British Paramountcy was effectively transferred to Pakistan.

However, without making any agreement with Pakistan and in violation of the standstill agreement, the Khan of Kalat declared independence. Later on, the ruler of Kalat unconditionally signed an Instrument of Accession with Pakistan on 27 March 1948, contrary to the wishes of his state's legislature, being the last of all princely states to do so.

=== First conflict ===
After a period of negotiations during which Pakistan used bureaucratic tactics while All India Radio provided 'strange help', Kalat acceded to Pakistan on 27 March 1948. Ahmad Yar Khan signed the Instrument of Accession, a decision which his brother, Prince Abdul Karim, revolted against in July 1948. Princes Agha Abdul Karim Baloch and Muhammad Rahim refused to lay down arms, leading the Dosht-e Jhalawan in unconventional attacks on the army until 1950. The Princes fought a lone battle without support from the rest of Balochistan. Jinnah and his successors allowed Yar Khan to retain his title until the province's dissolution in 1955.

=== Second conflict ===
Nawab Nauroz Khan took up arms from 1958 to 1959 to resist the One Unit policy, which decreased government representation for tribal leaders. He and his followers started a guerrilla war against Pakistan, and were arrested, charged with treason, and imprisoned in Hyderabad. Five of his family members, sons and nephews, were subsequently hanged on charges of treason and aiding in the murder of Pakistani troops. Nawab Nauroz Khan later died in captivity. Nawab Nauroz Khan fought a lone battle as the rest of Balochistan did not support the uprising.

=== Third conflict ===
After the second conflict, a Baloch separatist movement gained momentum in the 1960s, following the introduction of a new constitution in 1956 which limited provincial autonomy and enacted the 'One Unit' concept of political organization in Pakistan. Tension continued to grow amid consistent political disorder and instability at the federal level. The federal government tasked the Pakistan Army with building several new bases in key areas of Balochistan. Sher Muhammad Bijrani Marri led like-minded militants in guerrilla warfare from 1963 to 1969 by creating their own insurgent bases. Their goal was to force Pakistan to share revenue generated from the Sui gas fields with the tribal leaders. The insurgents bombed railway tracks and ambushed convoys. The Army retaliated by destroying the militant camps. This insurgency ended in 1969, with the Baloch separatists agreeing to a ceasefire. In 1970 Pakistani President Yahya Khan abolished the One Unit policy, which led to the recognition of Balochistan as the fourth province of West Pakistan (present-day Pakistan), including all the Balochistani princely states, the High Commissioners Province, and Gwadar, an 800 km^{2} coastal area purchased from Oman by the Pakistani government.

=== Fourth conflict, 1973–1977 ===
The unrest continued into the 1970s, culminating in a government-ordered military operation in the region in 1973.

In 1973, citing treason, President Bhutto dismissed the provincial governments of Balochistan and NWFP and imposed martial law in those areas, which led to armed insurgency. Khair Bakhsh Marri formed the Balochistan People's Liberation Front (BPLF), which led large numbers of Marri and Mengal tribesmen into guerrilla warfare against the central government.

Assisted by Iran, Pakistani forces inflicted heavy casualties on the separatists. The insurgency fell into decline after a return to the four-province structure and the abolishment of the Sardari system.

=== Fifth conflict, 2004–present ===
In early 2005, the rape of a female doctor (Shazia Khalid) at the Sui gas facility re-ignited another long running conflict. Her case and the unusual comment by then Pakistani President Pervez Musharraf about the controversy, stating on national television that the accused rapist, an officer identified only as Captain Hammad, was "not guilty", led to a violent uprising by the Bugti tribe, disrupting the supply of gas to much of the country for several weeks. In 2005, the Baluch political leaders Nawab Akbar Khan Bugti and Mir Balach Marri presented a 15-point agenda to the Pakistan government. Their stated demands included greater control of the province's resources and a moratorium on the construction of military bases. On 15 December 2005 the inspector general of the Frontier Corps (FC), Major General Shujaat Zamir Dar, and his deputy Brigadier Salim Nawaz (the current IGFC) were wounded after shots were fired at their helicopter in Balochistan Province. The provincial interior secretary later said after visiting Kohlu that "both of them were wounded in the leg but both are in stable condition."

However, a leaked 2006 diplomatic cable from the Embassy of the United States, Islamabad, noted that "[t]here seems to be little support in the province, beyond the Bugti tribe, for the current insurgency."

In August 2006, Nawab Akbar Khan Bugti, 79 years old, was killed in fighting against the Pakistan Army, in which at least 60 Pakistani soldiers and 7 officers were also killed. Pakistan's government had charged him responsible for a series of deadly bomb blasts and a rocket attack on President Pervez Musharraf.

In April 2009, Baloch National Movement president Ghulam Mohammed Baloch and two other nationalist leaders (Lala Munir and Sher Muhammad) were seized from a small legal office and allegedly "handcuffed, blindfolded and hustled into a waiting pickup truck which is in still [sic] use of intelligence forces in front of their lawyer and neighboring shopkeepers." The gunmen allegedly spoke in Persian (a national language of neighbouring Afghanistan and Iran). Five days later, on 8 April, their bullet-riddled bodies were found in a commercial area. The Baloch Liberation Army (BLA) claimed Pakistani forces were behind the killings, though international experts deemed it odd that Pakistani forces would be careless enough to allow the bodies to be found so easily and "light Balochistan on fire" (Herald) if they were truly responsible. The discovery of the bodies sparked rioting and weeks of strikes, demonstrations, and civil resistance in cities and towns around Balochistan.

On 12 August 2009, Khan of Kalat Mir Suleiman Dawood declared himself ruler of Balochistan and formally announced a Council for Independent Balochistan. The council's claimed domain included Sistan and Baluchestan Province, as well as Pakistani Balochistan, but did not include Afghan Blanch regions. The council claimed the allegiance of "all separatist leaders including Nawabzada Bramdagh Bugti." Suleiman Dawood stated that the UK had a "moral responsibility to raise the issue of Balochistan's illegal occupation at international level."

In April 2012, The Economist wrote: "[The Baloch separatists] are supported—with money, influence or sympathy—by some members of the powerful Bugti tribe and by parts of the Baloch middle class. This makes today's insurgency stronger than previous ones, but the separatists will nevertheless struggle to prevail over Pakistan's huge army."

In the aftermath of Akbar Bugti's killing, support for the insurgency surged with a large amount of support coming from Balochistan's burgeoning middle class. US-based exiled Baloch journalist Malik Siraj Akbar wrote that the ongoing Baloch resistance has created "serious challenges" for the Pakistan government "unlike the past resistance movements" due to its greater duration and breadth—it has included the entire province "from rural mountainous regions to the city centers", involved Baloch women and children at "regular protest rallies", and drawn more international attention, including a 2012 hearing by the US Congress. Islamabad has accused its neighbour India of supporting the insurgency in Balochistan.

In a 2014 article, Akbar reported that Baloch militants had begun killing their own commanders, and described the anger towards provincial Chief Minister Abdul Malik Baloch as "growing and often uncontrollable". By late 2014, infighting between insurgent groups had weakened the movement. On 23 November, BLA fighters attacked the Chinese Consulate.

In 2018, the Establishment of Pakistan was accused of using Islamist militants to defeat Balochi separatists, who allegedly ended up defecting to Islamist anti-state groups. Academics and journalists in the United States of Pakistani origin were alleged to have been approached by Pakistani officials of Inter-Services Intelligence, who cautioned them not to speak about "politically delicate subjects" such as the insurgency in Balochistan, including accusations of human rights abuses. The verbal warnings by officials also were accompanied with hidden warnings about the livelihoods of their family members in Pakistan.

On 16 January 2025, Maulana Fazlur Rehman of Jamiat Ulema-e-Islam (F) told the Pakistan National Assembly that the government had entirely lost its authority in parts of Balochistan, where, he claimed, the national anthem could not be sung and the flag could not be hoisted in some schools due to fear of persecution and attacks by militants and insurgents.

==== Recent escalation ====
On 16 February 2019, armed men killed two Frontier Corps in Loralai. The next day, another attack took place on Pakistani security personnel in which four members of the Frontier Corps were killed in the Gardab area of Panjgur District. On 18 April 2019, a bus travelling from Gwadar to Karachi was ambushed near Ormara. 14 personnel from the Pakistan Navy and Pakistani Coast Guards were killed. On 15 October 2020, Radio Pakistan reported that at least 14 security personnel were killed after a convoy of state-run Oil & Gas Development Company (OGDCL) was attacked on the coastal highway in Ormara. On 27 December, seven soldiers were killed in a gun attack on a Frontier Corps (FC) Balochistan post in Harnai district.

Through 2020, Pakistan recorded 506 fatalities (169 civilians, 178 Security Forces personnel, and 159 militants), of which Balochistan alone accounted for 215 fatalities (84 civilians, 94 SF personnel, and 37 militants). The province was a close second only to Khyber Pakhtunkhwa, which recorded 216 fatalities (61 civilians, 57 SF personnel, and 98 militants).

According to the PIPS report, Balochistan is the second-most affected province by Pakistan in 2021. The report said that 136 people were killed in 81 terrorist attacks carried out by religious militants and Baloch nationalist organizations in Balochistan the previous year. Of the 81 terrorist attacks in the province in 2021, 71 were carried out by banned nationalist organizations such as the Balochistan Liberation Army, the Balochistan Liberation Front, the Baloch Republican Guard, and the Baloch Republican Army. Militants carried out a total of six attacks in January 2022, in which 17 people were killed, most of whom were security forces (14 security forces; 3 civilians), and 32 people were injured, most of whom were civilians (26 civilians; 6 security forces).

On 18 January, at least five people were injured by an improvised explosive device planted near a railway track in the Mashkaf area of Balochistan's Bolan district. On 25 January, militants stormed a Pakistani military check post in Kech District, seizing weapons and killing at least 10 security personnel and injuring 3 others; the militants also suffered several casualties. On 30 January, 17 people, including two policemen, were injured in a grenade attack in Dera Allahyar town of Jaffarabad district. On 2 February 2022, 9 militants and 12 soldiers were killed at Panjgur and Nushki districts of Pakistan's Balochistan province after forces responded to their attack. The Balochistan Liberation Army claimed to have killed more than 100 soldiers at two military camps, claims rejected by Pakistan government.

On 14 July 2022, a lieutenant colonel was abducted and later killed in a clash near Mangi dam, Ziarat District. On 29 September 2023, a VBIED in Mastung District targeted an FC convoy, killing three soldiers including a major-ranked officer. On 7 February 2024, two bombings killed dozens on the eve of the 2024 Pakistani general election. On 14 May 2024, a Pakistani major was killed in an intelligence-based operation in Sambaza. On 26 August 2024, BLA members launched a series of attacks resulting in the deaths of more than 70 people. On 9 November, a suicide bombing attack at the Quetta railway station resulted in more than 30 deaths and many injuries.

In 2025, there were 1,557 recorded incidents including 10 suicide bombings. On 1 February 2025, militants intercepted a convoy in Mangocher and killed 18 Pakistani soldiers. From 11 to 12 March 2025, insurgents affiliated with the Baloch Liberation Army hijacked a Jaffar Express train, killing at least 59 people and taking hundreds more hostage. In a series of confrontations by the Pakistani military, 346 hostages were freed and all 33 insurgents were killed. On 21 May 2025, a school bus in Khuzdar was attacked in a suicide bombing, which killed 10 people including eight children, the bus driver, and a bus conductor, and injured 53 people, including 39 children. No group have taken responsibility, but the Baloch Liberation Army is widely suspected of having carried out the attack. On 8 August, 33 members of the TTP, which the ISPR describes as Fitna Al Khwarij, were killed by security forces as they tried to cross into the Sambaza area of the Zhob district across the Pakistan–Afghanistan border. The forces also recovered a cache of arms, explosives, and ammunition.

On 31 January 2026, separatist militants launched coordinated attacks across Pakistan’s Balochistan province, targeting military installations, police stations, and banks in at least 10 cities, including Quetta and the port city of Gwadar. The assault involved suicide bombings, armed attacks, road blockades, and the destruction of railway tracks, resulting in the deaths of at least 31 civilians and 17 security personnel. On 24 May, the BLA carried out a suicide bombing attack on a shuttle train in Quetta, killing at least 47 people and injuring 98 others.

In July 2026, a series of attacks allegedly coordinated by the Balochistan Liberation Army (BLA) and Tehreek-e-Taliban Pakistan (TTP) targeted the Balochistan Police and Pakistan Army, resulting in the death of 38 security personnel. In response, Pakistani security forces launched Operation Shaban, a large-scale counterterrorism operation targeting militant hideouts and support networks in several districts of the province.

== Conflict in Iran ==
Baloch people in Iran have several grievances. The Shi'ite Islamic revolution perceived the predominantly Sunni Baloch as a "threat". Sistan-e-Balochistan, the province where Baloch have traditionally lived in Iran, is the worst performing province in Iran for life expectancy, adult literacy, primary school enrollment, access to improved water sources, sanitation, and infant mortality rates. Despite its important natural resources (gas, gold, copper, oil, and uranium), it also has the lowest per capita income in Iran. Almost 80% of the Baloch live below the poverty line.

In 2014 it was estimated that there were about 2 million ethnic Baloch in Iran. In 2024, this estimate rose to 4.8 million.

=== Background ===
In 1928, the new Pahlavī government of Iran was sufficiently well established to turn its attention to Balochistan. Dost Mohammad Khan Baloch refused to submit to the Pahlavīs, trusting in the network of alliances he had built across the province south of the Sarḥadd. However, as soon as Reżā Shah's army under General Amīr Amanullah Jahanbani arrived in the area, the alliances dissolved. Left with few allies and a relatively small force, Dūst-Moḥammad Khan was easily defeated by the Persian army. Once again Baluch political unity proved highly brittle. Dūst-Moḥammad eventually surrendered and was pardoned on the condition that he lived in Tehran. After a year, he escaped while on a hunting trip, but was recaptured and hanged for the murder of his guard during his escape. Baloch activists complained that the new governance was centralised and dominated by the Persians, "forcing the Baloch community and other minorities to fight to protect their rights."

=== Attacks by insurgents ===
In the early 2000s the radical Islamist group Jundallah became active in Balochistan. The al Qaeda-linked extremist organization has branches in both Iran and Pakistan. From 2003 to 2012, an estimated 296 people were killed in Jundullah-related violence in Iran. Attacks in Iran included bombings in Zahedan in 2007, which killed 18 people, and another bombing in 2009 that killed 20 people. In 2009, 43 people were killed in a bombing in Pishin. Among the deaths in the Pishin bombings were two Iranian Revolutionary Guards generals: Noor Ali Shooshtari, the deputy commander of the Revolutionary Guards' ground forces, and Rajab Ali Mhammadzadeh, the Revolutionary Guards' Sistan and Baluchistan provincial commander. In July 2010, 27 people were killed in bombings in Zahedan. In 2010, a suicide bombing in Chabahar killed 38 people.

In 2010 the leader of Jundallah, Abdolmalek Rigi, was killed, causing fragmentation of the group but not an end to insurgent attacks. In October 2013, the group Jaysh al-Adl (JAA, Army of Justice), killed 14 Iranian border guards in an ambush in the town of Rustak, near the town of Saravan. Shortly thereafter, the Iranian authorities executed 16 Balochs, on charges ranging from terrorism to drug trafficking. Another group, Harakat Ansar Iran (Partisan Movement of Iran, HAI) killed two Basij officers and wounded numerous civilians in an October 2012 suicide bombing against the mosque of Imam Hussein, in the port city of Chabahar.

According to analyst Daniele Grassi, "Salafism plays an increasingly central role" for the "post-Jundallah" militants of JAA and HAI. "The rhetoric of groups such as HAI and JAA uses strongly anti-Shia tones. The two groups often refer to the Iranian Islamic Republic as a Safavid regime, in reference to the Safavid dynasty which introduced Shiism in Iran." Iran is also concerned about anti-Shia co-operation between the two groups and ISIS.

Iran has accused America of supporting Jundallah "for years". The US government, which has officially designated Jundallah a terrorist organization, has denied this charge. Iran has been angered by JAA's use of Pakistani territory as a refuge, and has threatened military operations in Pakistan to counter insurgent groups "on several occasions".

=== Impact on Iran–Pakistan relations ===
Relations between Iran and Pakistan are generally peaceful, but both countries have accused each other of harbouring Baloch militants, resulting in mutual distrust.

In January 2024, the Iranian and Pakistani militaries successively attacked separatist targets in border areas. Regional tensions had been stoked by Iran's missile strikes and Pakistan's military operation.

In late 2024, both countries agreed to work together and cooperate to put down the Baloch Insurgency. This included conducting a joint-airstrike and operation against Jaysh al-Adl.

== Drivers of insurgency ==
Insurgency in Balochistan (Pakistan) has been driven by economic inequality, underdevelopment, and cultural tensions involving immigration, disappearances, and human rights violations. Militants give various immediate reasons for joining one of the several separatist militant groups, with some citing the allure of power and excitement, a desire to honour their centuries-old tribal codes, gaining recognition for their region's distinct ethnicity, and even a belief in hardline communism.

The News International reported in 2012 that a Gallup survey conducted for the DFID revealed that most of the Balochistan province does not support independence from Pakistan, with only 37% of ethnic Baloch and 12% of Pashtuns in Balochistan favouring independence. However, 67% of Balochistan's population favoured greater provincial autonomy, including 79% of ethnic Baloch and 53% of Pashtuns in the province.

=== Economic inequality ===
Economic inequality, and Balochistan's status as a "neglected province where a majority of population lacks amenities", is a dimension in the conflict. Since the mid-1970s Balochistan's share of Pakistan's GDP has dropped from 4.9% to 3.7%. Balochistan has the highest infant mortality rate, maternal mortality rate, poverty rate, and illiteracy rate in Pakistan.

=== Development issues ===
==== Gas revenue ====
Balochistan receives less royalties per unit of gas than Sindh and Punjab provinces, since Balochistan's wellhead price is five times lower than in Sindh and Punjab (the gas wellhead price is based on per capita provincial income in 1953). Furthermore, the government has returned little of the royalties owed to the province, citing the need to recover operating costs. Consequently, Balochistan is heavily in debt.

Balochistan Province receives Rs 32.71 per unit on gas revenues, including a royalty of Rs 13.90, excise duty of Rs 5.09, and gas development surcharge of Rs 13.72. Many private individuals with gas deposits on their land also receive payments. Many Balochs argue that such royalties are too low. In response, in 2011 Prime Minister Syed Yusuf Raza Gilani announced an addition of Rs. 120 billion (US$2.5 billion) to the gas development surcharge and royalty portion of the "Aghaz-e-Haqooq-e-Balochistan" package. However, royalties often do not trickle down to the common people in Balochistan due to the corruption and wealth-hoarding of Baloch tribal chiefs. This has hindered the growth of infrastructure.

==== Regional inequality ====
Extensive road and rail links developed by British colonialists in northern parts of Balochistan province have brought greater economic development to areas mainly inhabited by ethnic Pashtuns, which has also heightened nationalism among ethnic Balochs living in the southern parts of the province.

==== Gwadar ====
Purchased by the government of Pakistan from Oman in 1958, the construction of the megaport of Gwadar beginning in 2002 became another source of grievances. Baloch complains that construction of the port relies on Chinese engineers and labourers, and that thus few Balochs have been employed. A parallel town for workers at Gwadar is being built close to the old one to segregate Balochis from the growing influx of outsiders.

The Pakistani government has stationed soldiers in the area to secure it from insurgent attacks.

=== Multiculturalism and immigration ===
Due to the historical shortage of skilled labour in Balochistan, skilled workers are often imported from other regions. Their arrival means new industries can develop, boosting the local economy; however, nationalists argue that this creates resentment among the local inhabitants.

After the Soviet invasion of Afghanistan, around 4 million refugees from Afghanistan arrived and settled in the region, producing a substantial demographic imbalance. Perceived marginalization as a result of increased Pashtun migration from Afghanistan during the Afghan War drives the insurgency.

=== Education issues ===
A major factor in the Balouchistan conflict is education, which nationalists feel has been neglected. The government of Pakistan recognises that importing skilled labour from other regions has caused tensions in the region, and has thus sought to encourage scholarships for Balochi students so they can participate in development programmes. The quota for Baloch students in Punjab University was doubled in 2010 under the Cheema Long Scheme, on the order of Chief Minister Shabaz Sharif. The provincial governments of Sindh, Punjab, and Khyber Pakhtunkhwa said they would take steps to encourage Balochistan students to enroll and benefit from 100% scholarships.

=== Military response ===
Many Balochis have tended to not look favourably on the Pakistan army's intervention in politics as they consider the military dominated by Punjabis (who make up 45% of Pakistan's population) and Punjabi interests, and lack representation for Balochis.

In the insurgencies themselves, the military's "harsh response" has led to "a spiral of violence". A report by the Pakistan Security Research Unit notes, "Islamabad's militarized approach has led to ... violence, widespread human rights abuses, mass internal displacement and the deaths of hundreds of civilians and armed personnel."

According to the International Crisis Group, the attempt to crush the insurgency as in earlier insurgencies is feeding Baloch disaffection. Moderate Balochis have been alienated from the government by the imprisonment of civilians without charges, and the routine kidnapping of dissidents. (Note: Researcher Mickey Kupecz credits the political domination of Pakistan by the military to the tendency to respond to the insurgency with "overwhelming force" rather than with a political approach. "That the Baloch issue has been handled militarily rather than politically makes sense given the lack of civilian control over the country. Despite the restoration of democracy after the departure of General Pervez Musharraf, the military remains the dominant political authority and pays no heed to the commands of the civilian government. ... Unsurprisingly, its response to nearly any problem has been one of overwhelming force. As a consequence, Balochistan has become a third front for the military ...")

== Foreign support ==
=== Afghanistan ===
Afghanistan provided sanctuary and training to Baloch separatists in 1948, in the mid-1950s, and more vigorously under the regime of Afghan President Mohammed Daoud Khan. In the 1970s, Daoud Khan's government established training camps for Baloch rebels at Kabul and Kandahar in Afghanistan. These were the first modern training camps in the country. The camps in Kabul were under the supervision and control of Republican guards.

The former Pakistani ambassador to the US, Hussain Haqqani, wrote that, in the 1970s, Daoud Khan set up training camps in Afghanistan to support Baloch separatists in Pakistan. According to a student paper, "Pakistan's fear that a communist Afghanistan would embolden the Baloch and Pashtun Marxist separatists in the western Pakistani province of Balochistan was confirmed when Daoud began supporting Marxist Baloch and Pashtun groups in eastern Afghanistan". Additionally, as Christian Parenti writes: "As president, Daoud started antagonising Pakistan [...] He set up a training camp outside Kandahar for Baluch rebels to foment trouble across the border in Pakistan."

Daoud Khan ended hostilities against Pakistan following the 1975 Panjshir Valley uprising led by Ahmad Shah Massoud against Khan's government. Visiting Pakistan in 1976, and again in 1978, Daoud Khan expressed his desire for peace between the two countries. In 1978, however, he was removed from office by a communist coup in 1978, after which Nur Muhammad Taraki seized power and established the Democratic Republic of Afghanistan. Nur Muhammad Taraki reopened the Baloch training camps in Afghanistan and once again started offering arms and aid to Baloch rebels.

According to WikiLeaks cables published in 2010, the then-president of Afghanistan, Hamid Karzai, had been providing shelter to Brahumdagh Bugti for several years. Brahumdagh Bugti, along with some 20 separatists, had fled to Afghanistan in 2006, and his presence in Afghanistan had created tensions between Pakistan and Afghanistan. In 2007 Pakistan's president, Pervaiz Musharraf, stated that Bugti was freely travelling between Kabul and Kandahar, raising money and planning attacks against Pakistani security forces. Musharraf repeatedly asked Hamid Karzai to hand over Bugti, which Karzai refused to do. In public, Afghan officials denied providing shelter to Bugti, but later, following a 2009 meeting between UN officials and Karzai, admitted that Bugti was indeed living in Kabul. While speaking to The Guardian, Bugti admitted that he was leading the fight against Pakistan's army. In 2010 he travelled to Switzerland and took up residence there. In 2017, his request for political asylum was rejected by Swiss authorities on the grounds that he had been linked to "incidents of terrorism, violence and militant activities".

In June 2012, the then-Chief of the Frontier Corps troops in Balochistan, Major General Obaidullah Khan Khattak, said that "over 30 militant camps" had been established in Afghanistan, which receive support from Afghanistan and are used "to launch terrorist and anti-state activities in Balochistan". Malik Siraj Akbar, a Washington-based analyst, states that Afghanistan has always been a relatively safe hideout for the Baloch nationalist militants.

On 25 December 2018, Aslam Baloch, alias Achu, and six other Baloch Liberation Army (BLA) commanders were killed in a suicide attack in Kandahar, Afghanistan. A BLA spokesman confirmed their deaths. Afghan officials stated that General Abdul Raziq Achakzai had housed Aslam Baloch and other separatists in Kandahar for years. Moreover, the Afghan news channel TOLOnews reported that Aslam Baloch had been residing in Afghanistan since 2005. According to Kandahar police chief Tadin Khan Achakzai, Aslam Baloch and Abdul Raziq Achakzai were "close friends" and that "Afghans will continue supporting separatist groups in their fight against the government of Pakistan".

On 23 May 2019, a similar attack took place in Aino Mina, Kandahar. Laghari Bugti and three other Baloch insurgents were killed, while a further twelve were injured. Afghan provincial council member Yousaf Younasi said it was the second attack on BLA members in recent years in Kandahar's posh Aino Mina residential area, the same where Aslam Baloch had been killed. Baloch separatist leader Sher Muhammad Bugti confirmed that the attack had taken place, but said that the target of the attack was a senior separatist leader, Shah Wali Bugti. He said that "Baloch separatists were not safe in Kandahar and they had come under attack in three places over the past few months". Kandahar Police Chief Tadin Khan stated that the attack in Aino Mena took place outside the house of a former National Directorate of Security (NDS) official.

The Afghan National Resistance Front's foreign relations head, Ali Nazary, strongly condemned the 2025 Jaffar Express hijacking and expressed condolences to the people of Pakistan along with the families of the victims, holding the Taliban responsible for harbouring the (BLA) militants responsible for the attack and accusing them of contributing to the growing regional instability.

On 10 April 2025, an explosion in Kandahar’s Aino Mina neighbourhood reportedly killed 12 members of Pakistani militant groups, including the BLA and the Pakistani Taliban (TTP), and wounded five others, according to local sources. The blast occurred as militants were leaving a gathering, but Taliban officials denied any airstrikes, attributing the explosion to old or decaying munitions stored near the anti-narcotics department. Residents reported hearing a powerful blast followed by gunfire, and that local emergency crews responded to contain the incident.

=== India ===
Avinash Paliwal claims that in the 1970s, junior-level Indian intelligence officers were actively involved in operations in Balochistan. Paliwal writes that these officers claim, "we gave Baloch everything, from money to guns, during the 1970s, everything." He further states that, like Pakistan and India, Iraq and Iran were bitter rivals. As a result, Pakistan and Iran had developed closer relations with each other, while India and Iraq did likewise. Arming Baloch insurgents in Iran and Pakistan was in the interest of both Iraq and India. Militant groups like Pasthun Zalmay, which were made up of Baloch and Pashtun militants, were in direct contact with Kabul as well as with Indian and Iraqi missions in Afghanistan. Pashtun Zalmay was responsible for a series of bomb blasts and other insurgent activities in Pakistan. As a consequence, relations between Iran and India deteriorated so much that in 1975, Indian diplomat Ram D. Sathe sent a secret letter to the Indian ambassador in Tehran in which he claimed that "it will be [only] a few more days before Iranians will stridently back Pakistanis (on Kashmir) ... Personally I do not think we should be under any illusion about this matter. I think Iranians will definitely back the Pakistanis".

Later on, in 2008, Paliwal claimed that if there had ever been an India–Afghanistan axis on Balochistan, it would likely have been in full play during this period. Afghan intelligence chief Amarullah Saleh and Indian diplomat Mayankote Kelath Narayanan were closely engaged with Baloch militants. Paliwal claims that even if Indian intelligence agencies denied direct support to Baloch insurgents, it was unlikely that they would have remained aloof from unfolding dynamics. Atul Khare, who observed these events on a regular basis, confirmed that India had contacts with Baloch militants. India had given (limited) protection to the sons and grandsons of Baloch leaders, as well as Akbar Bugti. However, Khare claims that India did not help Akbar Bugti when he was killed during the fight with the Pakistan Army. In January 2009, Baloch militants continued their attacks against Pakistan. Both Pakistan and the United Kingdom believed that India was providing support to the Baloch militants.

The Indian newspaper The Hindu reported that Balochistan Liberation Army (BLA) commanders had, in the past, sought medical treatment in India's hospitals, often in disguise or with fake identities. In one such case, a militant commander in charge of Khuzdar city was based in Delhi for at least six months in 2017 while he underwent extensive treatment for kidney-related ailments. Baloch militants' visits to India were often under assumed identities. Similarly, another Baloch Liberation Army commander, Aslam Baloch (alias Achu), was also alleged to have visited India, where he met with people who were sympathetic to the Balochi cause. Aslam Baloch was also alleged to have been treated at a hospital in New Delhi. Jitendranand Saraswati, the founder of the Hind Baloch forum, claimed that Indians were actively contributing to the "freedom struggle of Balochistan".

According to Malik Siraj Akbar, a Baloch journalist living in exile, there is a consensus among Pakistani authorities that India is behind the insurgency in Balochistan, without feeling a need to share evidence of Indian involvement. Pakistan has repeatedly accused India of supporting Baloch rebels, starting with an attack in Gwadar in 2004 in which three Chinese engineers were killed. Wright-Neville writes that the Pakistani government and some Western observers believe that India secretly funds the BLA.

The former American Af-Pak envoy Richard Holbrooke said in 2011 that while Pakistan had repeatedly shared its allegations with Washington, it had failed to provide any evidence to the United States that India was involved with separatist movements in Balochistan. He did not consider Pakistan's accusations against India credible. Holbrooke also strongly rejected the allegation that India was using its consulates in Afghanistan to facilitate Baloch rebel activity, saying he had "no reason to believe Islamabad's charges", and that "Pakistan would do well to examine its own internal problems". In 2009, a Washington-based think tank, the Center for International Policy, published a report stating that no evidence of Indian involvement in Balochistan had been provided by Pakistan, and that the allegations made by Pakistan lacked credibility, as Baloch rebels had been fighting with "ineffectual small arms".

Brahamdagh Bugti stated in a 2008 interview that he would accept aid from India, Afghanistan, and Iran in defending Balochistan. When asked about the alleged links between his group and India, he is reported to have laughed and said, "Would our people live amid such miserable conditions if we enjoyed support from India?" Baloch National Front secretary Karima Baloch claims that the allegations against India are an "excuse to label [the] ingrown Balochistan freedom movement as a proxy war to cover up the war crimes [the] Pakistani state has committed in Balochistan".

On 29 March 2016, the Pakistani government announced that it had apprehended a serving Indian naval officer, Kulbhushan Yadav, who, in a video interview, admitted that he had been tasked by the Research and Analysis Wing (R&AW) with destabilizing Pakistan. The Indian government confirmed that Yadav was a former naval officer but denied that "this individual was involved in subversive activities in Pakistan at our [the Indian government's] behest", and asserted that he operated "a legitimate business in Iran", from where he may have been "abducted" by Pakistan or, (allegedly), by the extremist militant organization Jaish-ul-Adil. In 2017, Kulbhushan Jadhav, was charged with espionage and sabotage and was sentenced to death. He was accused of operating a covert terror network within Balochistan. Jadhav had confessed that he was tasked by India’s intelligence agency, the Research and Analysis Wing (RAW), "to plan and organize espionage and sabotage activities" in Balochistan and Karachi.

In 2016, Indian Prime Minister Narendra Modi criticized Pakistan and alleged human rights issues in Balochistan during an Independence Day speech. Pakistan condemned Modi's remarks, calling it an attempted diversion from violence in Kashmir and a reiteration of Pakistani allegations vis-a-vis Indian involvement in Balochistan. Modi's comments were welcomed by exiled Baloch separatist leaders but sparked anti-India protests by political organizations and locals in Balochistan.

On 8 October 2015, the Indian newspaper The Hindu confirmed the presence of Balaach Pardili, a representative of the Balochistan Liberation Organization (BLO), in India. Balaach Pardili hails from Afghanistan and has been living in Delhi since 2009. Hyrbyair Marri, leader of the Baloch Liberation Army (BLA), had assigned Pardili the task of representing him in public events in India. Mr. Pardili appeared in public on 4 October 2015, under the banner of Bhagat Singh Kranti Sena (BSKS). His presence in India angered Pakistan. A Pakistani diplomat stated that in response to Pardili's presence in India, Pakistan could take up the issue in India's troubled North-Eastern region.

Naela Quadri Baloch and her son Mazdak Dilshad Baloch also live in India. Mazdak Dilshad Baloch organises campaigns in India to support the Baloch cause, while his mother, Naela Quadri Baloch, is trying to gain support for the establishment of a Baloch Government-in-exile in India. However, Naela Quadri Baloch's proposal for a government-in-exile has been strongly opposed by other Baloch separatist leaders, such as Brahamdagh Bugti, who claim that Naela Quadri does not represent the Baloch people.

India officially denies supporting the Baloch separatists.

=== Iraq ===
On 10 February 1973, Pakistani police and paramilitary raided the Iraqi embassy in Islamabad, seizing a large cache of small arms, ammunition, grenades, and other supplies, which were found in crates marked 'Foreign Ministry, Baghdad'. The ammunition and weaponry was believed to be destined for Baloch rebels. Pakistan responded by expelling and declaring persona non grata the Iraqi Ambassador Hikmat Sulaiman and other consular staff. In a letter to U.S. President Nixon on 14 February, Bhutto blamed India and Afghanistan, along with Iraq and the Soviet Union, for involvement in a "conspiracy ... [with] subversive and irredentist elements which seek to disrupt Pakistan's integrity."

In the 1980s, the Iraqi Intelligence Service, encouraged by CIA, supposedly helped Pakistani Sunni extremist group Sipah-e-Sahaba Pakistan, and the Mujahedin e-Kalq against Iran.

=== Israel ===
According to author Mark Perry, CIA memos revealed that in 2007 and 2008 Israeli agents posed as American spies and recruited Pakistani citizens to work for Jundallah (a BLA affiliate) and carried out false flag operations against Iran.

Later, in January 2012 article, Mark Perry questioned the validity of the previous allegations, asserting that the CIA "had barred even the most incidental contact with Jundallah." The rumors originated in an Israeli Mossad "false flag" operation; Mossad agents posing as CIA officers supposedly met and recruited Jundullah members in cities such as London to carry out attacks against Iran. President George W. Bush "went absolutely ballistic" when he learned of Israel's actions, but the situation was not resolved until President Barack Obama's administration "drastically scaled back joint U.S–Israel intelligence programs targeting Iran" and ultimately designated Jundallah a terrorist organization in November 2010.

The Baloch Society of North America (BSNA) was a Baloch lobbying group founded in 2004 in Washington, D.C. by Dr. Wahid Baloch, a graduate of Bolan Medical College who had gone into self-imposed exile in the United States in 1992. Between 2004 and 2014, his group had been trying to gain American (as well as Israeli) support for the independence of Balochistan. He held meetings with several American Congressmen and allegedly had meetings with several CIA officials. Dr. Baloch had long claimed that the Pakistani government was committing acts of genocide against the Baloch people, and that Islamabad's aim was to plunder the province's vast mineral resources. In January 2014 he released a letter appealing to the United States and Israel for direct assistance in preventing an alleged "killing spree of Baloch people" by the "Pakistani army".

In May 2014, Dr. Baloch disbanded the BSNA, claiming that the War of Independence of Balochistan was actually a "war of independence of Khans, Nawabs and Sardars". He has since formed the Baloch Council of North America (BCNA), which has dedicated itself to working with all democratic and nationalist forces in Pakistan to secure Baloch rights through democratic, nonviolent means, within the federation of Pakistan.

=== Saudi Arabia ===
Iran considers Jundallah to be connected to the Taliban and their opium revenues, as well as receiving financial and ideological support directly from Saudi Arabia in collusion with other hardline elements within Pakistan and Afghanistan. Others alleged that United States had long supported low-intensity conflict and assassinations with Saudi money, especially against nationalists, socialists, and Shias.

American journalist Dan Rather traveled to Pakistan, the United Arab Emirates, Sweden, and France to investigate Jundallah and its funding sources. On the television news show Dan Rather Reports, he indicated that support comes from Balochis in Sweden where Radio Baloch FM is broadcast from Stockholm.

=== Soviet Union ===
Although the Balochistan Liberation Army (BLA) was founded in 2000, some media and analysts speculate that the group is a resurgence of prior Baloch insurgencies. According to some sources, two former KGB agents code-named "Misha" and "Sasha" were among the BLA's chief architects. In addition, Pakistani scholar Syed F. Hasnat alleged that during the Soviet–Afghan War (1979–1989), the Soviet Union helped establish the BLA.

=== Syria ===
During the 1960s insurgency in Balochistan, Syria had provided support to the Balochistan Liberation Front (BLF). BLF itself was founded by Jumma Khan Marri in 1964 in Damascus, the capital of Syria, and had played an important role in the 1963–1969 in Sistan and Baluchestan province of Iran, which had later spilled over into Pakistani Balochistan.

=== United Kingdom ===
Iranian authorities had accused the United Kingdom of supporting Jundallah.

The BBC production "Panorama: Obama and the Ayatollah" briefly mentions, but does not name, a terrorist organization that had carried out acts of terror leading to death of civilians and children in Iran, with the official prosecution files and their Interpol warrants blacked out in the video. The international warrants called for their arrest under international anti-terrorism laws, which had not happened; Tehran blames Western governments, particularly the British government, for protecting them from international arrest.

=== United States ===
In the 1980s, the Iraqi Intelligence Service, encouraged by the CIA, supposedly helped the anti-Shia Sunni Pakistani extremist group Sipah-e-Sahaba Pakistan and the Marxist–Islamist Iranian opposition group Mujahedin e-Kalq against Iran.

In April 2007, a report by Brian Ross and Christopher Isham of ABC News alleged that Jundallah "had been secretly encouraged and advised by American officials" to destabilize the government in Iran, citing US and Pakistani tribal and intelligence sources. The report alleges that US Vice President Dick Cheney discussed the activity of the group against Iran during his visit to Pakistan. In a blog, the network stated that the support was believed to have started in 2005 and been arranged so that the US did not fund the group directly, which would have require Congressional oversight and attracted media attention, drawing parallels between American support for Jundallah and US involvement in Nicaragua. The report was denied by Pakistan official sources, but ABC stood by their claim despite the denial.

Alexis Debat, one of the sources quoted by Ross and Isham in their report alleging US support for the Jundullah, resigned from ABC News in June 2007, after ABC officials claimed that he faked several interviews while working for the company. Ross went on to say the Jundullah story had many sources, adding, "We're only worried about the things Debat supplied, not about the substance of that story." According to Ross, ABC had found nothing that would undermine the stories Debat worked on. However, he acknowledged that as the stories of fabrications continue to roll in, the network "at some point had to question whether anything he said can be believed"; this caused the network, in 2007, to send a second team of producers to Pakistan investigating the original reports.

Gholamali Haddadadel, Iranian parliament speaker in 2007, told reporters that Jundallah was part of pressure tactics used by United States to subdue Iran, and hoped with Pakistani help, Iran would be able to defeat Jundallah.

On April 2, 2007, Jundullah leader Abdolmalek Rigi appeared on the Persian service of Voice of America, the official broadcasting service of the United States government, which identified Rigi as "the leader of a popular Iranian resistance movement" and used the title of "Doctor" with his name. This incident resulted in public condemnation by the Iranian American community in the US, many of whom oppose the Iranian government as well as Jundallah.

Investigative journalist Seymour Hersh revealed another report in July 2008 that alleged that US congressional leaders had secretly agreed to former president George W. Bush's USD 400 million funding request, which enabled the US to arm and fund terrorist groups such as Jundullah militants.

Three days after the 2009 terror attack against Zahidan mosque, Iranian speaker of parliament Ali Larijani claimed that Iran had intelligence reports regarding United States links with certain terrorist groups operating against Iran, and accused the United States of commanding them. He also said that the United States was trying to start a civil war between Shia and Sunni segments of Iranian society. Regarding the investigation of the terrorist act, he added that Iran would want Pakistan to cooperate fully and not become a mere part of the designs against Iran.

According to a 2007 article in The Daily Telegraph, Jundallah is just one part of a Black Operation Plan involving psychological operations and other covert operations to support dissents among minorities (Baloch, Arab, Kurds, Azeris, etc.) in Iran, which along with tactics of military posturing, risky maneuvers, and occasional conciliatory gestures are designed to improve United States bargaining position in any future negotiation with Iran. Furthermore, these Black Operations build upon a coordinated campaign consisting of disinformation, placement of negative newspaper articles, propaganda broadcasts, the manipulation of Iran's monetary currency and international banking transactions.

Iranian Interior Minister Mostafa Pour-Mohammadi had said United States intelligence operatives have been meeting and coordinating with anti-Iranian militants in Afghanistan as well as encouraging drug smuggling into Iran. Former Pakistani Chief of Army Staff General Aslam Beg accused the Coalition Forces in Afghanistan of training and supporting Jundallah against Iran.

In February 2010, Iran captured Abdolmalek Rigi, who then alleged on Iranian TV "that the US had promised to provide" Jundullah "with military equipment and a base in Afghanistan, near the Iranian border" for its fight against Iran. Rigi did not mention assistance in fighting Pakistan (which Iran accuses of backing the Jundullah, according to the BBC). The US denied links with Jundullah, and the BBC noted that "it is not possible to say whether Abdolmalek Rigi made the statement freely or under duress."

After Rigi was arrested on 23 February 2010, Iran's intelligence minister Heydar Moslehi at a press conference in Tehran claimed that Rigi had been at a US base in Afghanistan 24 hours before his arrest. At a press conference, he flourished on a photograph which he said showed Rigi outside the base with two other men, though he gave no details of where the base was, or how or when the photograph was obtained. Photographs were also shown of an Afghan passport and identity card said to have been given by the Americans to Rigi. Moslehi also alleged that Rigi had met the then NATO secretary-general, Jaap de Hoop Scheffer, in Afghanistan in 2008, and had visited European countries. He said agents had tracked Rigi's movements for five months, calling his arrest "a great defeat for the US and UK". On February 25 Iranian state television broadcast a statement by Rigi stating he had had American support and that

"The Americans said Iran was going its own way and they said our problem at the present is Iran… not al-Qaeda and not the Taliban, but the main problem is Iran. We don't have a military plan against Iran. Attacking Iran is very difficult for us (the US). They [Americans] promised to help us and they said that they would co-operate with us, free our prisoners and would give us [Jundullah] military equipment, bombs, machine guns, and they would give us a base."

Reuters reported that Pentagon press secretary Geoff Morrell dismissed claims by the Iranian government that Rigi had been at an American military base just before his arrest. Morrell called the accusations of American involvement "nothing more than Iranian propaganda". According to a former US intelligence officer, Rigi was captured by Pakistani officials and delivered to Iran with US support: "It doesn't matter what they say. They know the truth."

On November 3, 2010, the US Department of State officially designated Jundallah as a Foreign Terrorist Organization, thereby making it a crime for any person in the United States or subject to the jurisdiction of the United States to knowingly provide material support or resources to Jundallah.

In January 2012, an article by Mark Perry questioned the validity of the previous allegations, asserting that the CIA "had barred even the most incidental contact with Jundallah." Although the CIA cut all ties with Jundallah after the 2007 Zahedan bombings, the Federal Bureau of Investigation (FBI) and United States Department of Defense continued to gather intelligence on Jundallah through assets cultivated by "FBI counterterrorism task force officer"; the CIA co-authorized a 2008 trip for McHale to meet his informants in Afghanistan. According to The New York Times: "Current and former officials say the American government never directed or approved any Jundallah operations. And they say there was never a case when the United States was told the timing and target of a terrorist attack yet took no action to prevent it."

On November 9, 2014, The New York Times published an article on the front page of its Late Edition, which states that an FBI counterterrorism task force officer by the name of Thomas McHale "had traveled to Afghanistan and Pakistan and developed informants inside Jundallah's leadership, who then came under the joint supervision of the FBI and CIA."

A February 2011 article by Selig S. Harrison of the Center for International Policy called for supporting "anti-Islamist forces" along the southern Arabian Sea coast, including "Baluch insurgents fighting for independence from Pakistan", as a means of weakening the "rising tide of anti-American passion" in Pakistan and heading off any alliance between Islamabad and Beijing (for context, Pakistan had granted China access to a naval base at Gwadar).

In late 2011, the Balochistan conflict became the focus of dialogue on a new US South Asia strategy brought up by some US congressmen, who said they were frustrated over Pakistan's alleged continued support to the Afghan Taliban, which they said led to the continuation of the War in Afghanistan. Although this alternative to the Obama Administration's Af-Pak policy generated some interest, it lacked broader support.

The US State Department's official policy as of 2016 rejects secessionist forces in the Pakistani part of Balochistan, in support of the country's "unity and territorial integrity". The US in 2016, however, expressed concerns over human rights issues and urged parties in Pakistan to "work out their differences peaceably and through a valid political process".

The US State Department designated the Balochistan Liberation Army as a global terrorist organization on 2 July 2019.

== Decline in insurgency ==
The separatist insurgency peaked after the death of nationalist leader Akbar Bugti in 2006. However, since 2013 the strength and intensity of the insurgency has gradually declined. The 2013 provincial elections resulted in the formation of a coalition among Baloch and Pashtun ethno-nationalist political parties, which ruled the province for the next four years.

=== Initial decline between 2016 and 2019 ===
The global decline of Marxist ideology limits the scope of the nationalist insurgency. The separatist groups follow Marxism. With the founders of the Baloch revolution dead, there are no ideologies to succeed them.

Another factor which limits the scope of the nationalist insurgency is infighting among the separatist groups. Separatist appeal have declined due to internal disagreements and clashes among separatist groups, and attacks on pro-government leaders and politicians willing to partake in elections. On 30 June 2015, the Baloch Liberation Army (BLA) clashed with the United Baloch Army (UBA), which resulted in the death of twenty separatists on both sides. Previously, the BLA had attacked and captured one of the UBA's commanders and killed four other members of the UBA.

Moreover, the separatists have been losing ranks. Though the exact strength of the BLA is not known, analysts believe that it now has only several hundred fighters based in the Afghanistan–Balochistan borderland. Of the separatist groups that formerly operated in the region (UBA, BLF, BLUF, and LeB), the BLA is the only one still extant. In April 2016, four militant commanders and 144 militants surrendered under reconciliation. 600 militants were killed and 1,025 surrendered after accepting reconciliation as of August 2016. In April 2017, another 500 Baloch rebels surrendered to the state, including members of the BRA, UBA, and LeB.

Furthermore, Baloch separatists themselves stand accused of human rights abuses. Human Rights Watch (HRW) published a 40-page report that accused Baloch nationalists of killing, threatening, and harassing teachers. HRW has also held separatists responsible for attacks on schools across the province. Another factor which limits the scope of the nationalist insurgency is the lack of support from locals, as the majority of locals do not support separatist groups. Locals support political parties who use the legislature to address their grievances.

== Human rights issues ==
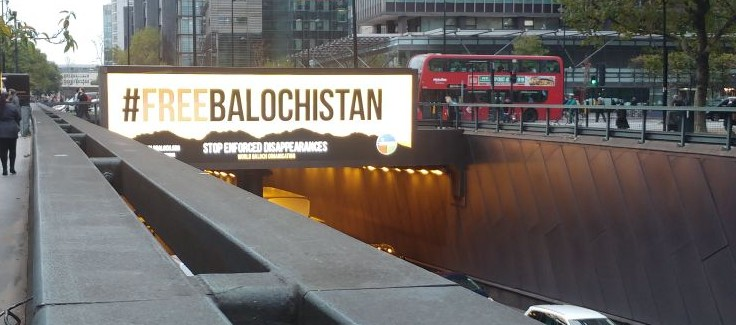
Poster against forced disappearances in Balochistan in London, UK

Human rights organizations have held the Balochistan Liberation Army (BLA) responsible for ethnic cleansing in the province. During a TV interview on 15 April 2009, Brahamdagh Bugti (the alleged leader of the BLA) urged separatists to kill non-Balochs residing in Balochistan. His actions allegedly led to the deaths of 500 non-Baloch citizens in the province. According to The Economist, around 800 non-Baloch settlers and Baloch have been killed by Baloch militant groups since 2006.

Fatalities in the Balochistan insurgency since 2000
2000	19
2001	33
2002	13
2003	78
2004	117
2005	266
2006	519
2007	212
2008	369
2009	267
2010	359
2011	707
2012	945
2013	975
2014	651
2015	636
2016	636
2017	341
2018	383
2019	180
2020	215
2021	308
2022	406
2023	471
2024	774
2025	1534
Civilians Security Forces Terrorists and Insurgents Unspecified Total fatalities by year in the Balochistan insurgency since 2000, including civilians, security forces, terrorists, and insurgents; may not all sum up to the total, as an "unspecified" category also exists.

Human Rights Watch has held Baloch militant groups like the BLA and the Balochistan Liberation United Front (BLUF) responsible for attacks on schools, teachers, and students in the province. As a result, many teachers have sought transfer to secure areas such as Quetta or have moved out of the province entirely. Separatist militant groups have also claimed responsibility for attacking and killing journalists in the province. Apart from human rights organizations, Baloch separatists themselves have accused each other of being involved in human rights violations.

From 2003 to 2012, an estimated 8,000 people were abducted by Pakistani security forces in Balochistan. In 2008 alone, more than 1,100 Balochi people disappeared. There have also been reports of torture. An increasing number of bodies "with burn marks, broken limbs, nails pulled out, and sometimes with holes drilled in their heads" are being found on roadsides as the result of a "kill and dump" campaign allegedly conducted by Pakistani security forces, particularly Inter-Services Intelligence (ISI) and the Frontier Corps (FC).

A 2013 report from the Human Rights Commission of Pakistan identified ISI and FC as the perpetrators for many disappearances, while noting a more cooperative stance from these agencies in recent years as perceived by local police forces. The Pakistan Rangers are also alleged to have committed a vast number of human rights violations in the region. No one has been held responsible for the crimes. However, Pakistani security officials have rejected all the allegations made against them. Major General Obaid Ullah Khan claims that Baloch militants are using FC uniforms to kidnap people and malign FC's reputation. Baloch militants have been found using military uniforms resembling FC's while carrying out their activities.

A senior Pakistani provincial security official claimed that missing person figures are "exaggerated", that "in Balochistan, insurgents, immigrants who fled to Europe and even those who have been killed in military operations are declared as missing persons". Reports have shown that many people have fled the province to seek asylum in other countries because of the unrest caused by separatist militants.

Militant groups like Lashkar-e-Jhangvi have systematically targeted Shia Muslims in Balochistan, with about 600 being killed in attacks by 2017.

During a camp at Broken Chair, Geneva, Baloch Republican Party (BRP) leader Sher Baz Bugti alleged that Baloch youth, women, and children were kept in "torture cells". BRP chief Brahumdagh Bugti called upon human rights organization, including the United Nations, to take steps to stop the alleged "Baloch genocide".

=== Sunni extremism and religious persecution ===
The activities of terrorist organizations such as Lashkar-i-Jhangvi and Tehrik-i-Taliban Pakistan have produced a surge in religious extremism in Balochistan. Hindus, Shias (including ethnic Hazaras), and Zikris have been targeted, resulting in over 300,000 emigrating from Baluchistan. Zikris have also been targeted by the Baloch Liberation Front (BLF) and Baloch Liberation Army (BLA) in the province.

=== Supreme Court investigation ===
There are more than 5,000 cases of "forced disappearances" in Balochistan. Many are innocent and stuck in Pakistan's slow court system while others are in prison awaiting charges such as gun smuggling and robbery. When asked about the situation, the chief justice of an apex court of Pakistan "observed that the situation [in Balochistan] appeared to be spinning out of control". The Supreme Court is currently investigating the "missing persons" and has issued an arrest warrant for the former Military Dictator Pervez Musharaff. Furthermore, the Chief Justice of the court said the military must act under the government's direction and follow well-defined parameters set by the Constitution.

==== Missing people found ====
In June 2011, the prime minister was informed that 41 missing people had returned to their homes, false cases against 38 had been withdrawn and several others had been traced. The PM urged police to trace the missing people and help them return to their homes. In 2011, the government established a commission which registered 5,369 missing person complaints. The commission claims to have traced more than 3,600 people.

In October 2018, Balochistan National Party (Mengal) (BNP-M) claimed that around 300 missing Baloch persons had returned to their homes. Similarly in January 2019, Voice of Baloch Missing People (VBMP) decided to suspend their protest after dozens returned to their homes. VBMP gave a list of 110 missing people which the VBMP expects the government to recover within two months.

On 29 June 2019, around 200 missing Baloch people were recovered according to Balochistan Home Minister Mir Ziaullah Langove. According Langove, VBMP had provided provincial authorities with a list of 250 missing people and that the commission on enforced disappearances was also hearing about 40 cases of missing persons.

==== Supreme Court orders ====
The Supreme Court apex court headed by Justice Iqbal ordered the Pakistani government to grant subsistence allowances to the affected families. Justice Iqbal advised families not to lose hope. He said the issue of missing persons had become a chronic problem and, therefore, the Commission of Inquiry on Enforced Disappearances, constituted on the orders of the apex court, should be made permanent.

== Effects and remedies ==
=== Development issues ===
The government of Pakistan has repeatedly stated its intention to industrialise Balochistan, and continues to claim that progress has been made by way of the "Aghaz-e-Haqooq-e-Balochistan" package of political and economic reforms issued in 2009. This is challenged by Baloch nationalist groups, who argue the benefits of these policies have not accrued to native Baloch residents of the province. Baloch nationalist groups continue to highlight the extraction of natural resources, especially natural gas, from the province without discernible economic benefit to the Baloch people. Nonetheless, the government of Pakistan continues to insist that industrial zones are planned along the new Gawadar–Karachi highway. According to the government, this development is envisaged to bring accelerated progress in the future for the Baloch.

In February 2006 three Chinese engineers assisting in the construction of a local cement factory were shot and killed in an attack on their automobile, while another 11 were injured in a car bomb attack by the BLA. China recalled its engineers working on the project in Balochistan. Progress in the hydro-power sector has been slow since then.

The people of the region have largely maintained a nomadic lifestyle marked by poverty and illiteracy. The indigenous people are continuously threatened by war and other means of oppression, which have caused thousands of fatalities over many years. Presently, according to Amnesty International, Baluch activists, politicians, and student leaders are among those that are being targeted in forced disappearances, abductions, arbitrary arrests, and cases of torture and other forms of mistreatment.

=== Economic effects and shortage of skilled workers and goods ===
The chief minister of the province has said:

"A large number of professors, teachers, engineers, barbers and masons are leaving the province for fear of attacks, This inhuman act will push the Baloch nation at least one century back. The Baloch nation will never forgive whoever is involved in target killings... He said the government has approved three university campuses, three medical colleges and hospitals for Turbat, Mastung, Naseerabad and Loralai districts but there was shortage of teachers in the area".

=== MPA personal development budget ===
Funding for Balochistan's annual development programme in 2010–11 was R27 billion, as compared to R13 billion in 2007–08. This allowed each Member of the Provincial Assembly of Balochistan a personal development budget of 180 million for their respective constituency, with the figure increasing to 250 million in 2011–2012. However, critics argue that development funding does not resolve deep political issues, and that MPAs have no incentive to find political solutions with the insurgents when they believe they will receive more funding as long as the insurgency continues. There have also been allegations that MPAs are exploiting the PSDP programme to arrange kickback schemes and other forms of corruption.

=== Gadani Energy Corridor ===
Four coal-fired power plants will be built in Gadani, creating a power corridor in Balochistan based on the Houston Energy Corridor. This was announced by Prime Minister Nawaz Sharif during a visit to the region in 2013. The Gadani Power Park is expected to generate 5,200 megawatts of electricity. Some nationalist groups objected to the project, saying they had not been consulted and instead favoured expanding access to electricity in the province rather than increasing capacity.

=== Farm subsidy ===
The federal government announced that it would transfer Rs4 billion subsidy to the Provincial Government to be passed on to Balochistan farmers to promote the construction of tube-wells. The Provincial Government announced that it would also spend Rs3 billion to support the Federal Programme. However, high levels of corruption among civil servants and senior ministers may mean communities will only receive partial benefits.

=== Army Education City at Sui ===
In January 2011, General Ashfaq Parvez Kayani, then-Chief of Army Staff of the Pakistan Army, announced the establishment of Education City in Sui. The military said it had built colleges in Balochistan, such as the Balochistan Institute of Technical Education (BITE) and the Gwadar Institute of Technical Education (GITE), with approximately 1,673 graduates. Around 22,786 Baloch students attend military-run educational institutions.

== See also ==
- Baluchistan (Chief Commissioner's Province)
- Baloch nationalism
- Las Bela
- Kharan
- Khanate of Kalat
- Baluchistan States Union
- Human rights violations in Balochistan
- Forced disappearance in Pakistan
- Balochistan Liberation Army
- MQM violence (1994–2016)
- MQM militancy
- Insurgency in Sindh
- Insurgency in Khyber Pakhtunkhwa
- Sectarian violence in Pakistan
- Terrorism in Pakistan
- Separatist movements of Pakistan

== Bibliography ==
- Kupecz, Mickey (2012). "Pakistan's Baloch Insurgency: History, Conflict Drivers, and Regional Implications" (PDF). International Affairs Review. 20 (3). Archived from the original (PDF) on 1 July 2015.
- Siddiqi, Farhan Hanif (2012). The Politics of Ethnicity in Pakistan: The Baloch, Sindhi and Mohajir Ethnic Movements. Routledge. ISBN 978-0-415-68614-3.
- Hasnat, Syed Farooq (2011). Global Security Watch–Pakistan (1st ed.). Praeger. ISBN 978-0-313-34697-2.
- "Pakistan: The Forgotten Conflict in Balochistan". International Crisis Group Asia. 22 October 2007.
- Chawla, Iqbal (2012). "Prelude to the Accession of the Kalat State to Pakistan in 1948: An Appraisal". Journal of the Research Society of Pakistan. 49.
