= 1958–1959 Kalat rebellion =

Conflict between Pakistani forces and Princes of Kalat

- Part of the Insurgency in Balochistan
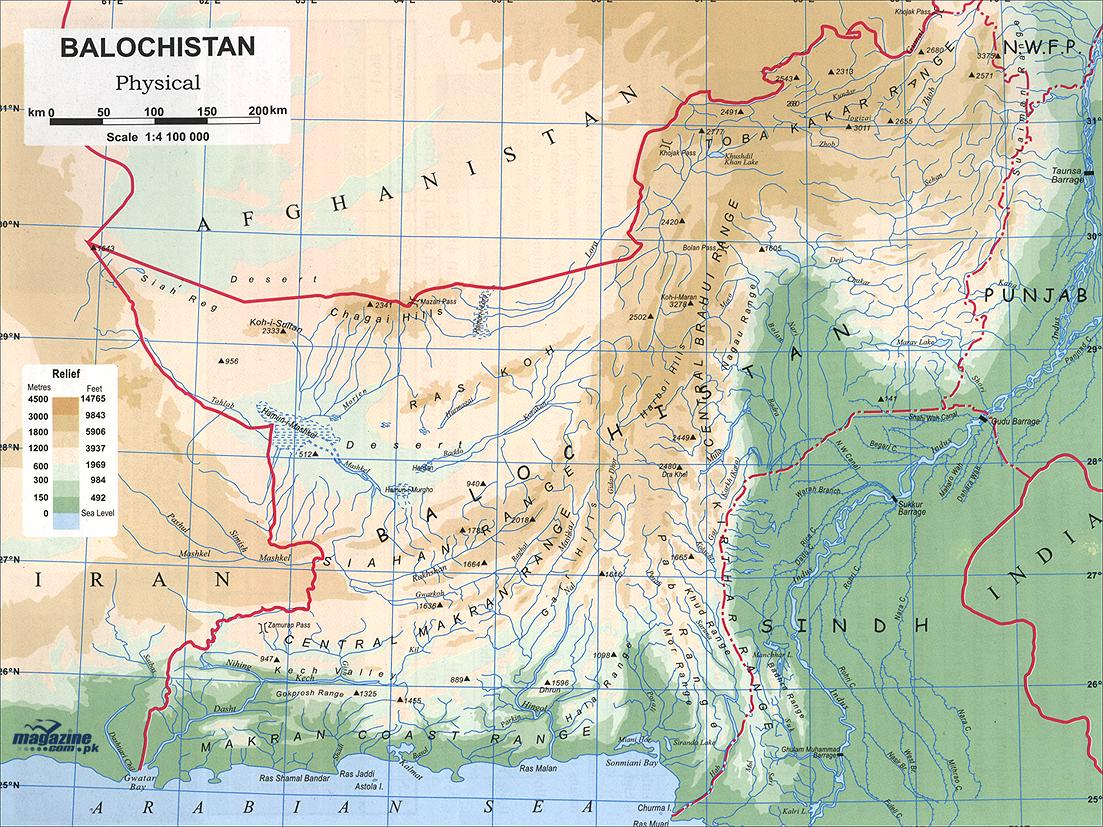
- Physical Map of Balochistan, Pakistan, where the fighting took place.
Date	1958 – 1959
Location	Balochistan, Pakistan
Result	Pakistani victory: Suppression of rebellion; Surrender of Nauroz Khan

Belligerents
Pakistan	Kalat insurgents

Commanders and leaders
(Pakistan) Iskander Mirza (Pakistan) Ayub Khan (Pakistan) Tikka Khan	Yar Khan (surrendered); Nauroz Khan (surrendered)

Units involved
Pakistan Army; Pakistan Air Force	Kalat insurgents

Strength
Unknown	1,000+ militants

Casualties and losses
Unknown	500+ captured Unknown killed

In 1958, Nawab Nauroz Khan took up arms in resistance to the One Unit policy, which decreased government representation for tribal leaders, and instigated a revolt against Pakistan from 1958 to 1959.

He and his followers started a guerrilla war against Pakistan, and were arrested in 1959, charged with treason, and imprisoned in Hyderabad. Five of his family members, sons and nephews, were subsequently hanged on charges of treason and aiding in the murder of Pakistani troops. Nawab Nauroz Khan later died in captivity.

== Background ==
=== 1948 rebellion ===
In 1948, Prince Agha Abdul Karim and Prince Muhammad Rahim of Kalat launched a rebellion in Jhalawan in response to accession of Kalat and with the aim of establishing Kalat as an independent state from Pakistan. With the arrest of the princes and loss of a lot of manpower, the rebellion ultimately came to an end in 1950 with Pakistan recapturing all territories.

=== Attack on Kalat Palace ===
In 1958, Ahmad Yar Khan tried to ambush the Deputy Commissioner. He invited him to his place and when he came the palace guards led by the Khan's son Prince Mohiuddin, attacked him. Three persons were wounded. In retaliation the following day, a tank of the Pakistan Army fired multiple rounds on the palace of Khan and the Khan was forced to surrender and was taken away to Lahore. While the Khan was being taken away, a crowd gathered outside the palace and upon a clash with the troops three were killed and at least two others were wounded. About 350 people were arrested in Kalat and neighbouring towns. It was alleged that the Khan had stored large quantity of weapons and food for a large private army to wage a rebellion against Pakistan. On October 6, 1958, Pakistani President Iskander Mirza issued an order that took stripped powers away from Ahmed Yar Khan and all his distinctions, privileges and immunities.

=== Dismissal of the government ===
Iskander Mirza abolished the constitution, imposed martial law, dissolved the national and provincial assemblies, and dismissed the government. Pakistani government also stressed the Baloch tribesman, especially in Jhalawan and Sarawan, to turn in their arms at the respective local police stations

=== One Unit scheme ===
The One Unit Scheme was the reorganisation of the provinces of Pakistan by the central Pakistani government. It was led by Prime Minister Muhammad Ali Bogra on 22 November 1954 and passed on 30 September 1955. The government claimed that the programme would overcome the difficulty of administering the two unequal polities of West and East Pakistan separated from each other by more than a thousand miles. To diminish the differences between the two regions, the 'One Unit' programme merged the four provinces of West Pakistan (West Punjab, Sind, NWFP & Baluchistan) into a single province to parallel the province of East Pakistan (now Bangladesh).

The One Unit program was met with great resistance and grievances were raised by the four provinces since its establishment. As per scholar Julien Levesque, the One Unit project had mainly been pushed by the Punjabi elite of West Pakistan since 1953 with the aim of preventing politicians from East Pakistan from gaining power at the centre. The National Awami Party successfully sponsored a bill in the National Assembly calling for its dissolution and providing for regional autonomy. This led to the military takeover of the national government. The One Unit programme remained in effect until 1970. Finally, President General Yahya Khan imposed Legal Framework Order No. 1970 to end the One Unit program and reinstate the provisional status of the Four Provinces as of August 1947.

== Rebellion by Nauroz Khan ==
An armed battle began under the command of Nawab Nauroz Khan Zarakzai Zehri. Nawab Nauroz Khan gathered around one thousand armed Baloch tribals and demanded the immediate release of Ahmad Yar Khan of Kalat and the abolition of One Unit Scheme. As a result, a multiple battles erupted in the region, including near the Pakistan-Iran border,Jhalawan, Kohlu and Dera Bugti and in the suburbs of Quetta. A large number of Pakistani troops led by Lt. Col. Tikka Khan. and supported by Air force were sent to quell the rebellion.

=== Negotiations and Surrender ===
In 1959, Nawab Nauroz Khan and his men surrendered after peace talks between the tribal leaders and Pakistani government, who pledged to abolish One Unit Scheme and grant amnesty to Nauroz Khan and his men. Nauroz Khan said that government must first withdraw its troops from Balochistan, release the Khan of Kalat immediately, restore the princely state of Kalat and release all the political prisoners in Balochistan.

A jirga was sent to Nauroz Khan, along with a Quran as an assurance that he would come down from the mountains on its sanctity. When the militants came down from the mountains, they kissed the Qur’an and said that they respect the Quran but they won't surrender. The government delegation kept reassuring them through the Quran that the government was living up to its promise so they surrendered in 1959.

However, around 160 insurgents, including Nauroz Khan and his son, were trialed in a military court in Machh district. Nauroz Khan, his son, and five other family members were sentenced to death on the charges of treason and killing of Pakistani troops.

On 15 July 1960, seven of the leaders were executed by hanging in Hyderabad Jail. Nowroz was spared execution on account of his age, but died in Kohlu Jail in 1964. The Khan of Kalat was subsequently forgiven and freed.
