= 1948 Jhalawan rebellion =

Rebellion by Agha Abdul Karim in the Kalat region

- Part of Insurgency in Balochistan
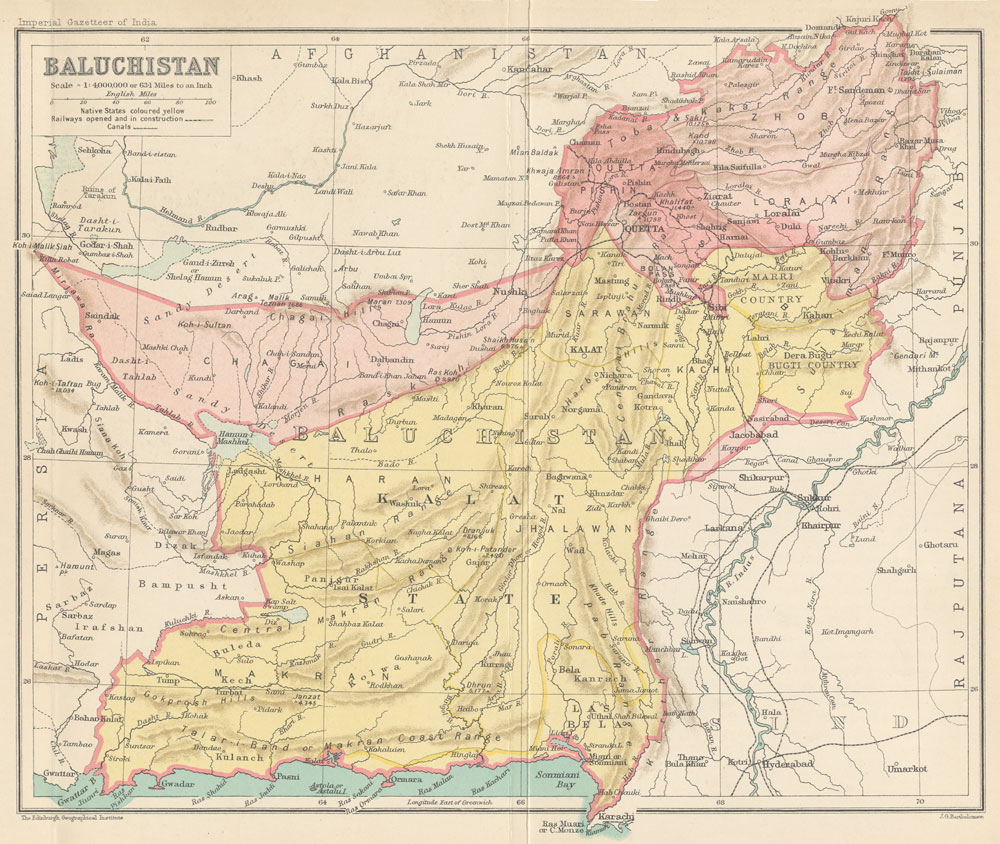
- Map of the Baluchistan Agency
Date	1948
Location	Jhalawan, Kalat, Balochistan
Result	Pakistani victory: Suppression of rebellion; Surrender of Agha Abdul Karim and Muhammad Rahim
Territorial changes	Pakistan recaptures Jhalawan

Belligerents
Pakistan	Kalat insurgents

Commanders and leaders
(Pakistan) Khawaja Nazimuddin; (Pakistan) Liaquat Ali Khan	Agha Abdul Karim (surrendered); Muhammad Rahim (surrendered)

Units involved
Pakistan Army	Dosht-e Jhalawan

Strength
Unknown	~1,000 militants

Casualties and losses
Unknown	Unknown

In July 1948, Agha Abdul Karim, brother of the Khan of Kalat, Ahmad Yar Khan, instigated a rebellion in the Jhalawan region against the Pakistani government in response to the Khan's signing of Kalat's instrument of accession to Pakistan. It was the first instance of the insurgency in Balochistan.

Karim formed the Dosht-i Jhalawan militia of about 1,000 militants and captured Jhalawan for a while. However, Pakistani forces quickly recaptured the fallen territory and Karim fled into neighbouring Afghanistan. He was later arrested by Pakistani authorities.

== Background ==
Balochistan contained a Chief Commissioner's province and four princely states under the British Raj. The province's Shahi Jirga and the non-official members of the Quetta Municipality opted for Pakistan unanimously on 29 June 1947. Three of the princely states, Makran, Lasbela and Kharan, acceded to Pakistan in 1947 after independence. The ruler of the fourth princely state, the Khan of Kalat, Ahmad Yar Khan, who used to call Jinnah his 'father', declared Kalat's independence as this was one of the options given to all of the 535 princely states by British Prime Minister Clement Attlee.

== Conflict ==
Kalat finally acceded to Pakistan on 27 March 1948 after the 'strange help' of All India Radio and a period of negotiations and bureaucratic tactics used by Pakistan. The signing of the Instrument of Accession by Ahmad Yar Khan, led his brother, Agha Abdul Karim, to revolt against his brother's decision in July 1948. Princes Karim Khan and Muhammad Rahim refused to lay down their arms and led the Dosht-e Jhalawan (numbering around 1000 militants) in unconventional attacks on the army.

=== Capture of Jhalawan ===
The Baloch militants captured the area of Jhalawan and used it as a base to stage further operations against Pakistani armed forces; after an offensive Pakistani forces were able to recapture this area. The militants suffered heavy casualties and were demoralised which ultimately contributed to their surrender.

=== Foreign involvement ===
Prince Karim Khan and some other Baloch separatist leaders such as Qadir Bakhsh Nizamani, Muhammad Hussain Anqa, Malik Saeed Dehwar, and Moulvi Muhammad Afzal, went to Afghanistan in May 1948, to obtain material and financial support from the Afghan government and the Soviet Union, but they failed to obtain any financial or military assistance although Agha Abdul Karim was granted refuge in Afghanistan. The Afghan government wanted to rather annex Balochistan as it was in desperately in need of a sea port. Prince Karim failed to get any support from the Afghan government and the local Balochs, who were not interested in rebelling against the government of Pakistan.

== Surrender and aftermath ==
On 15 July 1948, officials confirmed his arrest. The arrest took place at Harbol, a location approximately 16 miles from the city of Kalat. Some accounts indicate the surrender was negotiated under assurances of amnesty.

Before his arrest, he entered Kalat State territory accompanied by a force of approximately 500 armed personnel which led to an exchange of fire with Pakistani troops, numbering around 800, and resulted in two fatalities and several injuries among Karim's followers. While the majority of the armed force evaded capture, Karim and 126 associates were detained. The prisoners were subsequently transferred to the district jail in Quetta. He was tried by a special jirga and sentenced to ten years of imprisonment and was kept in Mach Jail until his death.

In 1950, other Kalat militants returned to Pakistan upon being granted amnesty by some Baloch statesmen and Pakistani government however on their return, they were arrested against the truce and sentenced to ten years in Haripur jail. Jinnah and his successors allowed Yar Khan to retain his title until the province's dissolution in 1955.

Eight years later in 1958, Second Kalat Rebellion, which lasted until 1960.

== Sources ==
- Cheema, Pervaiz I; Riemer, Manuel (22 August 1990). Pakistan's Defence Policy 1947-58. Palgrave Macmillan UK. ISBN 978-1-349-20942-2.
