= Agha Abdul Karim =

Baloch tribal chieftain

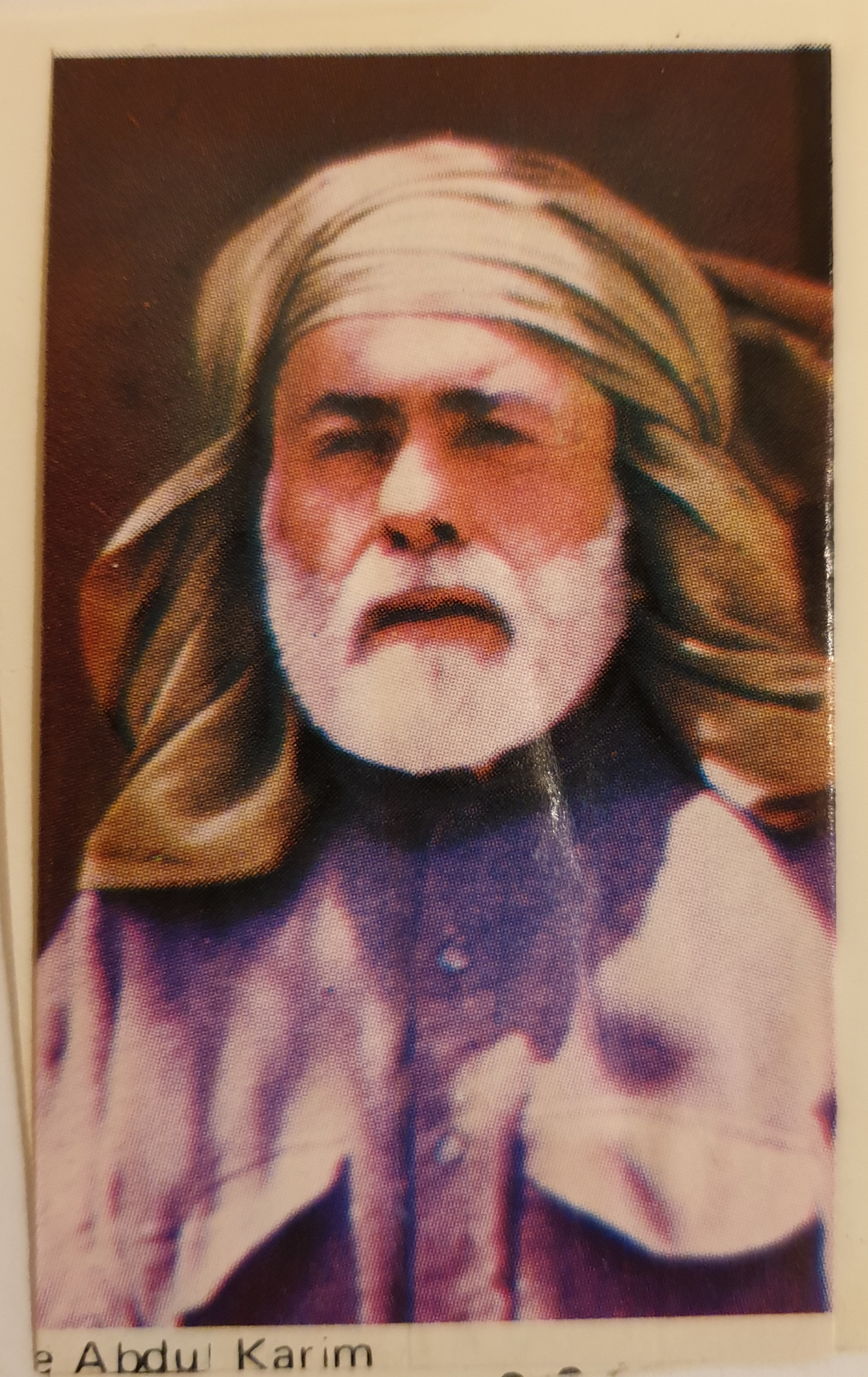
- Known for: Leading the 1948 Jhalawan rebellion against the accession of the Khanate of Kalat to Pakistan
- Relatives: Mir Ahmad Yar Khan (brother)
- Family: Khan of Kalat family

Agha Abdul Karim was a Baloch nationalist and a member of the ruling family of the former Khanate of Kalat. Before the accession of Kalat to Pakistan, he served as the governor of Makran region.

Karim led an armed revolt against the state's accession to Pakistan in 1948 which led to an ongoing Baloch separatist movement in Pakistan. After a period in Afghanistan seeking external backing, he organized guerrilla activity in the Jhalawan region before surrendering to the state of Pakistan, which resulted in his arrest and imprisonment. He founded Ustman Gal which led to the formation of the National Awami Party and also served as the head of the branch of the "Sindhi, Baloch and Pakhtun Front" in Balochistan.

== Early life and career ==
Karim was born in the ruling family of the Khanate of Kalat and was the younger brother of Mir Ahmad Yar Khan, the Khan of Kalat who signed the Instrument of Accession with Pakistan in March 1948.

During the transition period of 1947–1948, Khan served as the Kalat administration's representative in the Makran district. In this role, he opposed the accession efforts led by Nawab Bai Khan Gichki.

== Insurrection ==
Following the accession of Kalat to Pakistan in March 1948, Khan rejected the new constitutional status and continued operating from his office. In April 1948, he launched an armed insurgency under the Baloch National Liberation Committee after the Pakistani takeover of Kalat. Khan sought external support by crossing into Afghanistan; however, he failed to secure assistance from the Afghan government. Karim issued a manifesto after going to Afghanistan and framed his opposition around the accession decision and demanded for renewed negotiations over Kalat's status.

Upon his return, Karim organized guerrilla operations in the Jhalawan region.

== Imprisonment ==
On 15 July 1948, officials confirmed his arrest. The arrest took place at Harbol, a location approximately 16 miles from the city of Kalat. Some accounts indicate the surrender was negotiated under assurances of amnesty.

Before his arrest, he entered Kalat State territory accompanied by a force of approximately 500 armed personnel which led to an exchange of fire with Pakistani troops, numbering around 800, and resulted in two fatalities and several injuries among Karim's followers. While the majority of the armed force evaded capture, Karim and 126 associates were detained. The prisoners were subsequently transferred to the district jail in Quetta. He was tried by a special jirga and sentenced to ten years of imprisonment and was kept in Mach Jail until his death.
