= Baloch Peshmerga =

Baloch nationalist group in Iran

The Baloch Peshmerga was a Baloch nationalist and separatist militant group based around Saravan in the Sistan and Baluchestan province of Iran. It was founded and led by Amanollah Barakzai in the aftermath of the 1979 Iranian revolution.

== History ==
The Baloch Peshmerga, or the "Pesh-Margan" ("those who fight to the death"), was founded by Amanullah Barakzai, a veteran Baloch nationalist who had made peace with Mohammad Reza Pahlavi but later reverted to his nationalism. The group initially comprised around 500 fighters and was based in the Saravan area. It was one of the main Baloch factions in Iran. Amanollah Barakzai was an active supporter of the Balochistan Liberation Front of Jumma Khan Marri before surrendering to the Shah. Amanollah Barakzai officially founded the Baloch Peshmerga in 1980 in the aftermath of the Iranian revolution. He later created the Baloch United Front along with several leaders. It sought the establishment of a Baloch homeland.

The Baloch Peshmerga, also known as the Baloch Volunteer Force, aimed to unite tribal resistance with urban nationalists against Iran, and also worked with Vahdat Baloch. The Baloch Peshmerga was also known as the Baloch Suicide Squads.

== See also ==
- Insurgency in Balochistan
