= Baloch nationalist–Islamic State conflict =

Conflict between Baloch separatists and the Islamic State

- Part of the Insurgency in Balochistan
- Map of Balochistan within Pakistan
Date	March 2025 – present
Location	Balochistan, Pakistan
Status	Ongoing conflict

Belligerents
Baloch nationalist militants	Islamic State

Units involved
Balochistan Liberation Army	Islamic State; Khorasan Province; Foreign fighters

Casualties and losses
1 militant executed	30 militants killed
- 15 civilians killed

The Baloch nationalist–Islamic State conflict refers to a series of violent engagements primarily between the Islamic State's affiliates and Baloch nationalists in and around the Balochistan province of Pakistan.

== Background ==
=== Insurgency, militancy, and anti-Shi'ism in Balochistan ===
Balochistan has long been a region affected by insurgency and militancy, with various Baloch nationalist groups, including the BLA, engaging in armed resistance against the Pakistani state. ISKP, an affiliate of the Islamic State active in Afghanistan, Iran and Pakistan, has also operated sporadically in Balochistan, particularly targeting Shi’a and other minorities. ISKP has excused attacks on Balochistan's Shia community as a way to stop the expansion of Shia madrass in Balochistan.

==== Recent rise in violence in Balochistan ====
In the 2010s, attacks against the Shia community by sectarian groups—though not always directly related to the political struggle—rose, contributing to tensions in Balochistan. In Pakistan, the ethnic separatist insurgency is low-scale but ongoing mainly in southern Balochistan, as well as sectarian and religiously motivated militancy concentrated mainly in northern and central Balochistan.

=== Overlapping territories and opposing ideologies ===
The Islamic State's Khorasan province primarily operates in the central-west parts of Balochistan, from the outskirts of Quetta and Mastung till Kalat, and parts of Khuzdar. From Mastung, the group's area of operations extends into the Bolan pass and reaches into Balochistan's Sibi district, which borders Pakistan's Sindh province. This puts the group in direct conflict with the Baloch Liberation Army as its area of operations as it overlaps with BLA's area of operations. It has put both groups at odds with each other, especially due ISKP having an Islamist-jihadist and Salafi jihadist ideology, aiming to establish a global caliphate, while BLA maintains itself as secularist-nationalist and Baloch nationalist-separatist group, aiming to separate Balochistan from Pakistan.

== Timeline ==
According to local law enforcement from Pakistan's Balochistan province, ISKP militants slit the throat of a BLA insurgent for spying on an ISKP camp. This caused fighters in a nearby BLA-affiliated group to then plan an attack on the ISKP camp in order to avenge the death of their executed comrade.

In March 2025, BLA militants reportedly surrounded, attacked, and destroyed the ISKP training camp near the Bolan River in Mastung. The raid resulted in the deaths of approximately 30 ISKP members, including foreign fighters from Turkey, India, Tajikistan, and Uzbekistan.

On May 25, 2025, ISKP officially declared war on Baloch pro-independence armed groups, including the BLA. The group accused these factions of launching unprovoked attacks on its fighters in Balochistan's Mastung district.

The announcement was made in a 36-minute Pashto-language video released by ISKP's media wing, Al-Azaim Foundation. The narrator says ISKP had previously maintained a “non-aggression policy” towards Baloch insurgents but now considers them adversaries. “Difficult and bloody days are ahead,” the narrator warns, adding that ISKP will retaliate against Baloch insurgent groups and their supporters, just as it has fought the Afghan Taliban. The video also claims that ISKP operates training camps in the mountainous regions of Balochistan. ISKP also released a booklet targeting nationalist movements such as the Baloch Yakjehti Committee (BYC) led by Mahrang Baloch and the Pashtun Tahafuz Movement (PTM) led by Manzoor Pashteen.

On 8 September, 2025 the Islamic State claimed a suicide bombing on a political rally of the Balochistan National Party-Mengal and supporters in the Quetta stadium parking lot which killed 15 people and injured several others.
