= Saulat Mirza =

Pakistani murderer and political activist

- صولت مرزا
- Born: Saulat Ali Khan; 1971; Karachi, Sindh, Pakistan
- Died: May 12, 2015 (aged 43–44); Central Jail Macch, Balochistan, Pakistan
- Cause of death: Execution by hanging
- Resting place: Muhammad Shah graveyard
- Other name: Saulat Mirza
- Citizenship: Pakistan
- Education: University of Karachi (B. Com)
- Occupation: Political activist
- Years active: 1994–1998
- Organization: APMSO
- Known for: Contract killings
- Political party: Muttahida Qaumi Movement
- Spouse(s): Nighat Mirza; 1997-2015
- Children: 1
- Status: Executed
- Conviction: Murder (3 counts)
- Penalty: Death

Saulat Mirza (Urdu: صولت مرزا born Saulat Ali Khan; 1971–12 May 2015), was a Pakistani convicted murderer, target killer, and a political activist of the Muttahida Qaumi Movement (MQM).

In 1997, he was convicted of a triple murder and was awarded a death sentence for the targeted murder of Shahid Hamid, a bureaucrat and managing-director of KESC (now K-Electric), along with his driver Ashraf Brohi, and his guard Khan Akbar, all of whom were killed in the neighborhood of Defence Housing Authority, Karachi on 5 July 1997. After being arrested by the CID in 1998 upon returning from Bangkok, Mirza was awarded death sentence by an Anti-Terrorism Court on 24 May 1999. His family filed clemency applications on two separate occasions: first before the Sindh High Court in 2000 and then before the Supreme Court of Pakistan in 2002; all applications were rejected by the apex court.

In 2013, his family submitted another application to President of Pakistan for clemency which was also rejected. After a death warrant was issued on 11 March 2015, the execution was set to be carried out in Central Jail Mach in Balochistan on 19 March 2015. Upon hearing of his impending execution, his family began pleading his case, where his wife and sisters held multiple press conferences, demanding a re-investigation. After releasing a confession video to multiple private news channels, where he leveled charges of murder involvement of MQM chief Altaf Hussain, Mirza's execution was ultimately halted on presidential orders and an active investigation against MQM was launched by the Pakistan government.

After rejecting the second and final appeal for clemency, Mirza was executed on 12 May 2015 at the supermax facility, the Central Jail Macch, Balochistan, Pakistan.

== Early life and education ==
Saulat Mirza was born as Saulat Ali Khan in Karachi in 1971 and grew up in the rural Malir neighborhood of Karachi, Sindh. In his interrogation process, he confirmed his Geographical distribution of Urdu speakers background and his Hindustani Pathan ancestry; his parents emigrated from what is now India to Pakistan at the time of the partition of British India. His father, Wajahat Ali Khan, worked as an army civilian staff clerk in the Pakistan Army, whereas his mother was a housewife. He was the youngest of 11 siblings, consisting of six brothers and five sisters.

After matriculating from a local school, Mirza initially enrolled for pre-medical degree but instead ended up getting intermediate diploma in Commerce from Pakistan Shipowners College. He eventually graduated from the BCom from the business school of Karachi University. Years later, while in jail, he would complete a Master's degree.

It was during his college years that Mirza joined the All Pakistan Muttahidda Students Organization (APMSO), taking strong participation in student politics. The APMSO was the student wing of then known as Mohajir Qaumi Movement later changed into Muttahida Qaumi Movement (MQM). During these days Mirza was an avid fan of Pakistan cricket team and often played cricket as well as table tennis.

Mirza was described as young good looking and attractive person and a devoted worker of the MQM.

== Political career and targeted killings ==
After joining the MQM and taking part in national politics, Mirza soon participated in illegal activities such as extortion and involved in acquitting in political murders. Mirza largely remained unknown and was not a known figure in the MQM until 1995 when his close friend Faheem Farooqi got arrested in 1995 and described him as his right-hand man. At one time, Mirza was a major figure in the militant wing of the MQM, running several death cells.

He was accused of coordinating the murders of six U.S. nationals in Shahrah-e-Faisal in Karachi, but he denied involvement in the killing of two US diplomats and four U.S. nationals of an American Oil Company in the city in 1994. However, the investigation later revealed Farood Dada, leader of the Nadeem Commando, and an accomplice of Mirza, was the main culprit. Farooq was later killed in a police encounter in 1995 by Karachi Police. Since then, the FIA and the intelligence community had him under strict surveillance. Although, Mirza did admit to killing a number of people, including a Pakistani employee of the U.S. Drug Enforcement Administration in 1995. Mirza reportedly fled the country in 1995 after Prime Minister Benazir Bhutto initiated a massive crackdown against MQM and returned home after Prime Minister Benazir Bhutto's dismissal in 1996.

On 5 July 1997, he shot and killed the Managing Director of Karachi Electric Supply Corporation (KESC) Shahid Hamid, his driver and guard in Karachi. He reportedly escaped to Bangkok and only returned to Karachi 2 weeks after his mother's death on 10 December 1998. A day later, on 11 December 1998, Mirza was arrested from the Jinnah Terminal in a sting operation led by CID officer Aslam Khan and was described as a "prize catch."

During his arrest, Mirza confessed that he was involved in a number of murders of innocent people, including several high-profile personalities, in the presence of DIG Sindh Police Ameen Qureshi. Mirza's wife later testified that he was in contact with Altaf Hussain just before arrest, though the MQM denied the charge.

In May 1999, the Anti-Terrorist Court awarded him a death sentence for the triple-murder case of MD of Karachi Electric Supply Corporation Shahid Hamid, his driver Ashraf Brohi and guard Akbar Khan.

In June 2013, he was transferred supermax facility, the Central Jail Macch in Balochistan, and was placed in the Death Cell after his mercy plea was rejected by Sindh High Court and President of Pakistan Mamnoon Hussain.

The Anti-Terrorism court issued the black warrant on 12 March against Mirza to be executed on 19 March 2015 in the early morning at Machh Jail Baluchistan. His sister filed another petition in Supreme Court seeking delay in execution but two-Judge bench turned down her appeal.

A few hours before Mirza's scheduled execution a video tape was released on Electronic Media of Mirza's confession, in which he accused MQM of ordering him to perform the crime. The MQM chief Altaf Hussain denied having met with Saulat and said there was no evidence, but instead claimed a conspiracy against MQM.

== Execution and burial ==
The execution originally scheduled for 19 March 2015 was deferred for 72 hours. An anti-terrorism court in Karachi re-issued a black warrant on 23 March 2015. On 12 May 2015 around 4:30 a.m. PKT, Saulat Mirza was hanged till death at Machh Jail in Balochistan, Pakistan. His body was flown from Quetta to Karachi via PIA flight.

Mirza's last prayers and ceremony were performed in Karachi and he was laid to rest at Muhammad Shah graveyard, North Karachi, which was attended by his close friends, family members and neighbours.
