= Nauroz Khan =

Baloch clan leader

Nawab Nauroz (Nowroz) Khan (1868?–1964), also known by Balochs as Dada (baluchi for grandfather) Nowroz, was the head of the Zarakzai (Zehri), a subject to the Khan of Kalat in Balochistan, British India (the area was not in British India until 1875). After his unsuccessful insurgency against the government of that time he was imprisoned in Kohlu jail where he died in 1964.

== Early years ==
Little is known about Nowroz Khan's early years. He was born some time in the 1860s or 1870s at a time when Kalat was a princely state within the framework of the British Raj. By 1887, the British had reached a settlement with Kalat agreeing on limited autonomy in exchange for British authority in military affairs and external relationships, but the country remained unstable, with periodic fighting against the authorities or between tribal groups.

Nauroz Khan became Nawab and leader of the Zehri tribe in the Jhalawan area of Kalat at a time before the introduction of electricity or motor vehicles, head of a largely nomadic people in a harsh mountain / desert environment, but with a rich tradition of Baluchi, Persian and Muslim culture.

== Background to insurgency ==
In 1955 the various states of Balochistan were dissolved and merged into the province of West Pakistan under the "One Unit" policy. In 1948, Ahmad Yar Khan, the Khan of Kalat (the largest former Baloch princely state), agreed to join Pakistan. The signing of the Instrument of Accession by Ahmad Yar Khan, led his brother, Prince Abdul Karim, to revolt against his brother's decision in July 1948. He along with few of his followers moved to Afghanistan to seek Afghan government support to form an independent Balochistan state. Afghan government wanted to rather annex Balochistan as it was in desperate need of a sea port. Prince Karim failed to get any support from the Afghan government and the local Balochs, who were not interested in rebelling against the government of Pakistan. He eventually surrendered to Pakistan after a year.

== Insurgency and imprisonment ==
Nowroz Khan's band of fighters, was involved in several sharp skirmishes with forces led by Lt. Col. Tikka Khan. Tikka Khan had sent a copy of the Quran to Nawab Nouroz asking him to negotiate a truce for the sake of the Quran, Nowroz agreed to surrender on May 15, 1959 in exchange for amnesty. However, when Nowroz Khan came down from the hills, he and about 150 of his followers, including his sons and nephews, were arrested for insurgency against the state.

On July 15, 1960 seven of the leaders were executed by hanging in Hyderabad Jail. Nowroz was spared execution on account of his age, but died in Kohlu Jail in 1964. The Khan of Kalat was subsequently forgiven and freed.
