= Machh =

Pakistani town

Machh مچھ
- Municipal Committee and Union Council
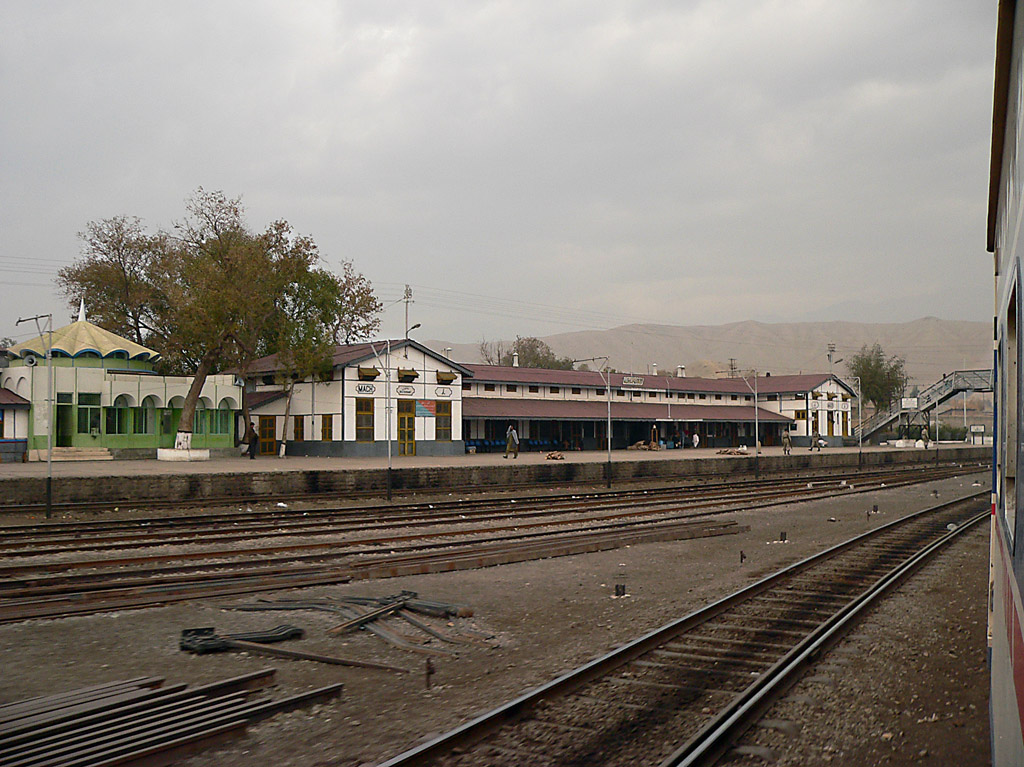
- Machh railway station

- Location in Pakistan Machh مچھ (Pakistan)
- Coordinates: 29°52′01″N 67°19′35″E
- Country: Pakistan
- Province: Balochistan
- District: Kachhi District

Government
  - Type: Local Government

Population (2023 census)
  - Total: 44,542
- Time zone: UTC+5 (PST)

Machh, or Mach (Balochi, Urdu: مچھ), is a town and union council of Kachhi District in the Balochistan province of Pakistan. The town has an altitude of 1006 metres (3303 feet) and is located at 29°52'0N 67°19'60E, - some about 50 km (70 km by road) southeast of Quetta, the provincial capital.

== Geography ==
Machh is located in between the stony hills. It is divided into 3 parts; area for jail, railway and town. There is only one bazaar.

== Demographics ==
=== Population ===
Historical population
Year	Pop.	±% p.a.
1951	3,211	—
1961	4,921	+4.36%
1972	7,273	+3.62%
1981	8,419	+1.64%
1998	14,488	+3.24%
2017	19,152	+1.48%
2023	44,542	+15.10%

As of the 2023 census, Machh has population of 44,542.

Languages

Languages of Mach (2023 Census)
1. Brahui (49.9%)
2. Balochi (29.6%)
3. Sindhi (9.29%)
4. Saraiki (3.37%)
5. Punjabi (3.15%)
6. Pashto (2.48%)
7. Urdu (1.05%)
8. Others (1.16%)

=== Religion ===
Religious groups in Machh City (1941 & 2017)
Religious group	1941		2017		2023	
Religious group	Pop.	%	Pop.	%	Pop.	%
Islam	1,632	73.51%	18,581	97.08%		
Hinduism	421	18.96%	277	1.45%		
Sikhism	121	5.45%	—N/a	—N/a		
Christianity	38	1.71%	282	1.47%		
Judaism	8	0.36%	—N/a	—N/a		
Total population	2,220	100%	19,140	100%	44,542	100%

== Economy ==
Most of the economic activity in Machh revolves around coal mines and the buying and selling of coal. The major source of employment is the public sector - Railway, Jail, Wapda, Sui Gas and Levies Force. Machh town has a market that caters to coal miners and residents. Mach has a jail, built in 1929.

== Weather ==
The climate is dry. It rains 3 or 4 times in a year. Machh experiences extreme winter and summer temperatures. The winter of 2016 saw heavy snowfall along the Kolpur and Kohebash areas of Machh.

== Transportation ==
People use cars, bikes and cycles for transportation in town. Pakistan National Highway N-65 runs along Tehsil Machh and is the only major road in the area.
