= Malik Siraj Akbar =

Baloch journalist

- Born: 9 July 1983 (age 43); Panjgur, Balochistan, Pakistan
- Occupation: Journalism
- Known for: Journalism; Founder of The Baluch Hal
- Website: http://www.thebaluchhal.com/

Malik Siraj Akbar (Urdu: ملک سراج اکبر) is an ethnic Baloch journalist based in the United States. He is the editor-in-chief of the Baluch Hal, the first online English language newspaper of Pakistan's Balochistan Province, Enkaar, a liberal Urdu language news magazine, and a contributing writer for The Huffington Post. He lives in exile in the United States.

In 2010 to 2011, Akbar was a Hubert Humphrey Fellow at Arizona State University while in 2012, the National Endowment for Democracy (N.E.D), a Washington DC–based organization, awarded him a Reagan-Fascell Democracy Fellowship where he researched the political assassinations, enforced disappearances and attacks on journalists in Balochistan. He was a 2014–15 Edward Mason Fellow at Harvard Kennedy School of Government where he was elected as the Vice President of Communications at the Kennedy School Student Government. He served as the web editor of Kennedy School's student newspaper, the Citizen.

== Early life ==
Akbar was born in the town of Panjgur in Balochistan, Pakistan. His mother hails from the Iranian side of Balochistan. He attended the Government Model High School Panjgur for his matriculation degree. He attended the Government Degree College Panjgur for a bachelor's degree in Political Science. In 2005, he became the first Pakistani male journalist to be awarded the Madanjeet Singh South Asia Foundation Media Scholarship that enabled him to undertake a one-year post-graduation diploma at the Asian College of Journalism in Chennai, India, where he studied print journalism focusing on politics, identities politics and gender issues. Akbar got his master's degree in International Relations from the University of Balochistan, Quetta.

== Political asylum ==
In October 2011, Akbar was granted political asylum in the United States owing to threats he said he faced from the Pakistani military authorities due to his outspoken writings that exposed human rights abuses in his native Balochistan. In an interview with Radio Free Europe, Akbar said it was a "painful" decision for him to apply for political asylum in the United States, adding that many Baluch journalists had disappeared and were subsequently found dead for which the Pakistani authorities were blamed. He shared his threats in an interview with CNN and in a blog post he wrote for the Committee to Protect Journalists.

The Washington Post said it was a "highly unusual decision" on the part of the U.S. government to grant political asylum to a journalist critical of Islamabad given Pakistan's status: a strategic partner in Washington's war against Islamic terrorism. BBC News said Akbar was a victim of the tough stance taken by the Pakistani government. On 14 November 2011, Mark C. Toner, the State Department spokesman, when asked about Akbar's asylum case, said the United States had raised the issue of the protection of journalists with the Pakistani government. On 15 November, a Pakistani journalist asked the State Department spokesman if granting Akbar political asylum meant that the United States had actually accepted the Baloch nationalist and separatist movements and legitimized it. Toner said, "we have broader concerns about the situation there and the freedom of the press in Pakistan". Akbar S. Ahmed, a former Pakistani high commissioner to the United Kingdom, defended Akbar's political asylum in the United States saying that a policy of "kill and dump" in Balochistan attributed to the Pakistani security forces was causing fear and terror among the Baloch.

== Political views ==
Akbar is a liberal and secular writer. In an interview with the Story of South Asia in 2014, Akbar said he wished to see a secular Balochistan while he also proposed secularism as a solution to end sectarian violence in Pakistan. He has highlighted the rise of radical Islam in Balochistan where he says the Pakistani government supports Islamists to counter the Baloch nationalists. According to him, Islamabad has given a 'free hand' to Jamaat-ud-Dawah, the "relief" wing of the Lashkar-e-Taiba, to operate in Balochistan.

== Ban on The Baloch Hal ==
On 9 November 2010, the Pakistan Telecommunication Authority blocked The Baloch Hal, Balochistan's first online English language newspaper Akbar had founded one year earlier in 2009. The PTA alleged that the Baloch Hal had published anti-Pakistan material, a charge Akbar vehemently denied in an interview with German Radio Deutsche Welle (DW). The reported that the PTA was reluctant to release the numbers and types of websites that have been blocked in Balochistan.

== Media appearances ==
Akbar is regularly interviewed and cited by different news organizations on various topics concerning Pakistan and Balochistan. In 2013, CNN profiled Akbar's life as a journalist at risk in Pakistan's dangerous province of Balochistan. He talked about the threats he had faced and journalist friends he had lost in the conflict in Balochistan. BBC World, while describing Akbar a "victim of the tough stance taken by the Pakistani government", interviewed Akbar how he used online journalism to spread the word about the unrest in his native Balochistan. In 2014 Al-Jazeera interviewed Akbar to speak about the threats to journalists in Pakistan and implications of the failed assassination attempt on journalist Hamid Mir. On 8 May 2013, Reuters cited Akbar in a report about the insurgency in Balochistan. The Guardian quoted Akbar in a report about the abduction of John Solecki, an American kidnapped in Balochistan.

== The Balochistan Institute ==
On 20 February 2016, Akbar announced establishing the Balochistan Institute, the first Baloch think tank–based in the United States. According to a news report quoting Akbar, the Balochistan Institute (BI) is committed to independent research and dialogue on Balochistan. The Institute aims to create a global understanding of the contemporary challenges and opportunities offered by the resource-rich Baloch region and promote awareness about its people, history, economy, culture and politics. When the Institute was established, the media in Balochistan reported the news prominently. For instance, Daily Tawar, an Urdu language newspaper, published the news about the Balochistan Institute as its top story with Akbar's picture.

== Publications ==
- The Redefined Dimensions of Baloch Nationalism
