= Naela Quadri Baloch =

Baloch politician

Naela Quadri Baloch (born July 18, 1965 Quetta, Balochistan, Pakistan) is a Baloch politician, activist for women's rights, author, poet and international lectures on Baloch Qaum Parast rights.

Naela is the daughter of Syed Ahmed Quadri, a well known lawyer and activist for Baloch Qaum Parasts Rights. Her mother, Bibi Gul Zarina, was a feminist, and founder of the first indigenous NGO in Balochistan. She is citizen of Canada.

Naela is married and mother of three sons. One, Mazdak Dilshad Baloch, lives in exile in Canada, though subsequently he has received Indian visas.

She is a founding member of the Hind-Baloch Forum in India, which has organised its first seminar in Agra. India rejected her visa after strong evidence presented by Pakistan. Recently, she signed in a joint human rights statement demanding the release of the student activist Rinshad Reera in Kerala, India.
