= Lashkar-e-Balochistan =

Inactive separatist organisation in Pakistan

- لشکرِ بلوچستان
- Active regions: Pakistan
- Ideology: Baloch nationalism Marxism; Secularism
- Status: Inactive

Lashkar-e-Balochistan (LeB) Urdu: لشکرِ بلوچستان, lit. 'Army of Balochistan' was a militant group based in Pakistan's Balochistan province, which was agitating for Balochistan's national independence. The LeB became publicly known in 2012, after it claimed responsibility for several bombings in Lahore, Karachi and Quetta, killing or injuring several people. The group is currently inactive.

== Designation as a terrorist organization ==
In August 2012, the Pakistani government designated LeB as a terrorist group.

== Allegations of foreign support ==
Pakistan has repeatedly accused India of supporting the Baloch militant groups in order to destabilize the country. India has categorically denied the allegation, stating that no concrete evidence has been provided.
