= Mach Jail =

Prison in Pakistan

- Interactive map of Mach Jail
- Location: Machh, Balochistan, Pakistan; 29°52′08″N 67°20′01″E
- Opened: 1929; 97 years ago

Notable prisoners
- Prince Karim Khan; Abdul Samad Khan Achakzai; Akbar Bugti; Ghaus Bakhsh Bizenjo; Gul Khan Nasir

Mach Jail, also spelled as Machh Jail (Urdu: مچھ جیل), and colloquially known as Kala Pani, is a prison situated 60 kilometres (37 mi) southwest of the Quetta valley in Pakistan. Established in 1929, the prison spans 13 acres (5.3 ha) in the arid, sparsely populated town of Machh. Surrounded by barren hills, Mach Jail stands as the primary structure in this remote area.

Noted for its extreme heat, Mach Jail has been compared to the Cellular Jail in India, which is also known as Kala Pani. The prison has historically been associated with the detention of political dissidents and freedom fighters, particularly during British rule. One section, known as the Chili Ward or Ward number 9, is infamous for the punitive treatment of prisoners who resisted colonial rule, including the adulteration of their food with chilies.

== History ==
Mach Jail was established in 1929 during British India era. Its remote location, approximately 10 to 15 kilometers from the small town of Machh, was chosen to impose severe punishments on freedom fighters away from public view.

Since 1978, a total of 61 prisoners have been executed at Mach Jail, many during the period of Zia-ul-Haq's martial law.

== Notable prisoners ==
- Prince Karim Khan
- Abdul Samad Khan Achakzai
- Akbar Bugti
- Ghaus Bakhsh Bizenjo
- Gul Khan Nasir
- Saulat Mirza
