= Jhalawan =

Administrative division of Kalat

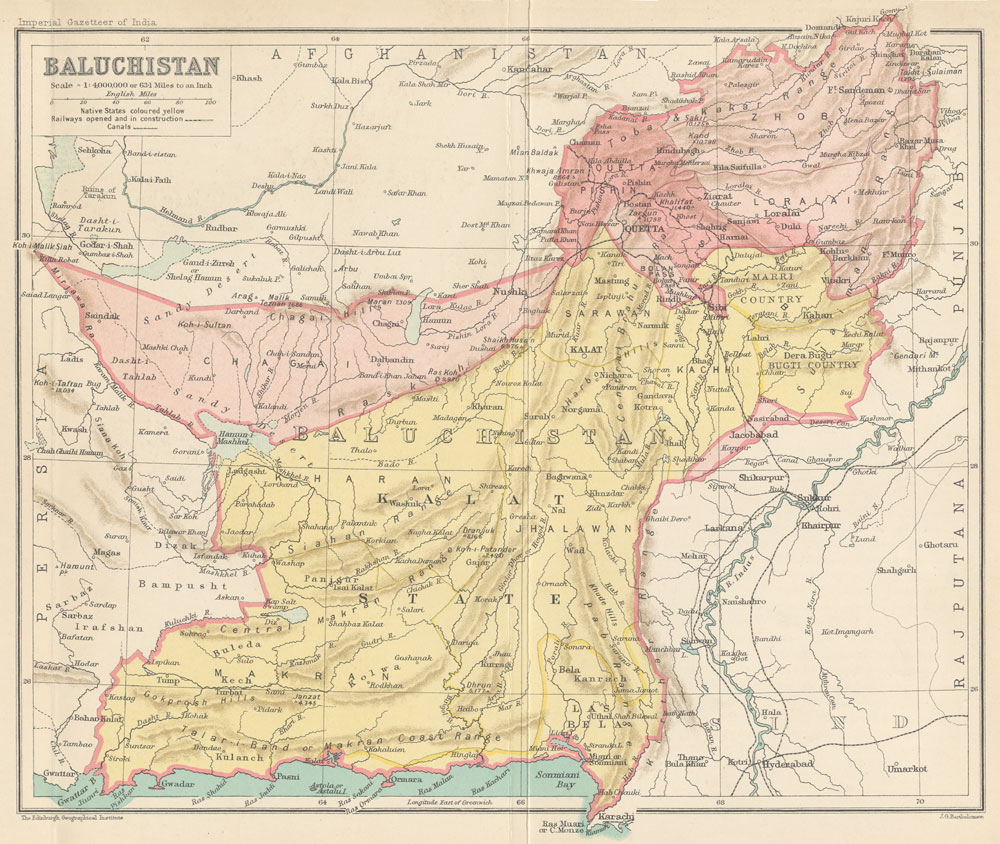
Map of the Baluchistan Agency.

Jhalawan (Brahui: جھالاوان, romanized: Jhālāwān) was an administrative division of the Khanate of Kalat, a princely state ruled by Brahuis that acceded to Pakistan in 1947. It was established in the 17th-century and its boundary was fixed with Sindh in 1853. It was located in the southeastern part of Kalat State, north of Lasbela, west of the Kacchi and Sindh and east of the Kharan and Makran.

== Demographics ==
Religious groups in the Jhalawan Division of Kalat State in British era
Religious group	1911		1921		1931		1941	
Religious group	Pop.	%	Pop.	%	Pop.	%	Pop.	%
Islam	83,914	99.43%	79,293	99.48%	88,780	99.78%	52,194	99.85%
Hinduism	472	0.56%	417	0.52%	197	0.22%	78	0.15%
Sikhism	12	0.01%	0	0%	1	0%	0	0%
Christianity	0	0%	0	0%	0	0%	0	0%
Zoroastrianism	0	0%	0	0%	0	0%	0	0%
Judaism	0	0%	0	0%	0	0%	0	0%
Jainism	0	0%	0	0%	0	0%	0	0%
Buddhism	0	0%	0	0%	0	0%	0	0%
Tribal	—N/a	—N/a	—N/a	—N/a	0	0%	0	0%
Others	0	0%	0	0%	0	0%	0	0%
Total population	84,398	100%	79,710	100%	88,978	100%	52,272	100%
