= List of journalists killed during the Balochistan conflict (1947–present) =

This is a list of journalists killed during the Balochistan conflict. The conflict has been going on since 1947, but since 2001, 28–33 journalists have been killed and between 2009 and 2012 at over 23 journalists have been killed.

Places in Balochistan, Pakistan, where journalists have been killed. The red shaded area is Balochistan, one of the four provinces of Pakistan. Mentioned locations within Pakistan relative to the capital Islamabad and the largest city Karachi.

== List ==
- Khalil Ullah Sumalani

== 2008 ==
- Chisti Mujahid, a columnist for Akhbar-i-Jehan, was assassinated by the Baloch Liberation Army in Quetta, 9 February 2008, for an article he had written about the death of leader Balach Marri.
- Khadim Hussain Sheikh, a journalist for the Urdu-language Khabrein, was killed in Hub, 14 April 2008.

== 2009 ==
- Wasi Ahmed Qureshi, Daily Azadi, died 16 April 2009, in Khuzdar from gunshot wounds from days earlier. Some news report claim that Baloch liberation army was responsible for killing Wasi Ahmed Qureshi.

== 2010 ==
- Malik Mohammad Arif, a Samaa TV camera operator, was killed by a suicide bomber on 16 April 2010.
- Faiz Muhammad Sasoli, Aaj Kal, was shot to death 27 June 2010 in Khuzdar while driving and after having survived two previous attempts on his life. Baloch Liberation Army (BLA), a militant group, claimed responsibility for killing him.
- Abdul Hameed Hayatan, a.k.a., Lala Hamid Baloch.
- Mohammad Sarwar
- Ejaz Raisani died from injuries 6 September 2010 from an earlier suicide bomb.

== 2011 ==
- Ilyas Nazar
- Wali Khan Babar, GEO News – 13 January 2011, Karachi
- Abdost Rind, Daily Eagle (Urdu) – 18 February 2011, around Turbat
- Rehmat Ullah Shaheen
- Zarif Faraz
- Siddique Eido
- Munir Ahmed Shakir Sabzbaat, a Baloch TV station – 14 August 2011, Khuzdar
- Akhter Mirza
- Javed Naseer Rind, Daily Tawar – sometime between 11 September 2011 and 5 November 2011

== 2012 ==
- Razzaq Gul Baloch, Express News – 19 May 2012, Turbat
- Haji Mohammad Rafique Achakzai
- Abdul Qadir Hajizai. He was killed by Baloch Liberation Front (BLF) in Washik district.
- Dilshad Deyani
- Abdul Haq Baloch
- Khalid Musa
- Abdul Ahad Baloch
- Rehmat Ullah Abdi
- Jamshaid Ali Karl

== 2013 ==
- Saif-ur-Rehman Baloch
- Muhammad Imran Sheikh
- Mohammad Iqbal
- Mehmood Ahmed Afridi. He was killed by Baloch Liberation Army (BLA) in Kalat.
- Haji Abdul Razzaq Baloch, Daily Tawar – sometime between 24 March 2013 & 24 August 2013

== 2014 ==
- Attack on the Online International News Network killed two journalists and one media worker on 28 August 2014 in Quetta. Irshad Mastoi was believed to have been the target while student reporter Abdul Rasul and accountant Mohammed Younus were also killed.

== 2020 ==
- Sajid Hussain (journalist)

== 2025 ==
- Abdul Latif Baloch, a journalist and correspondent for the Quetta-based Daily Intikhab, was shot dead by unidentified assailants at his home in Mashkey, Awaran district, on 24 May 2025. According to police, the attackers attempted to abduct him, and opened fire when he resisted. Baloch had previously lost a son to abduction and murder in the same area. Journalist organizations have condemned the killing. The Balochistan Union of Journalists (BUJ) described the incident as part of a wider plot aimed at suppressing independent voices in Balochistan. In a statement posted on X (formerly Twitter), the Baloch Yakjehti Committee described the incident as more than a personal tragedy, characterizing it as an act of terror intended to suppress the collective voice of the Baloch people.

== 2026 ==
- Lala Israfil Khan (June 2026): Senior correspondent for Hum News and other regional outlets, shot dead by unidentified gunmen in a local market in the Musakhel district.
- Nazar Muhammad Kanrani (August 2026): Vice president of the Awami Press Club Sohbatpur, gunned down by an armed assailant in the Ladies Bazaar area of Dera Allahyar, Jaffarabad district

== See also ==
- Censorship in Pakistan
