= Feudalism in Pakistan =

Feudalism in contemporary Pakistan usually refers to the power and influence of large landowning Ashraf families, particularly those with very large estates in more remote areas. The adjective "feudal" in the context of Pakistan has been used to mean "a relatively small group of politically active and powerful landowners." "Feudal attitude" refers to "a combination of arrogance and entitlement." According to the Pakistan Institute of Labor Education and Research (PILER), 5% of agricultural households in Pakistan own nearly two-thirds of Pakistan's farmland.

Large joint families in Pakistan may possess hundreds or even thousands of acres of land, while making little or no direct contribution to agricultural production, which is handled by "peasants or tenants who live at subsistence level." Landlord power may be based on control over the local people of Aljaf & Arzal ancestry through debt bondage passed down generation after generation, and power over the distribution of water, fertilisers, tractor permits and agricultural credit, which in turn gives them influence over the revenue, police and judicial administration of local government. In recent times, particularly "harsh feudalism" has existed in rural Sindh, Balochistan, and some parts of Southern Punjab. Pakistan's major political parties have been called "feudal-oriented", and as of 2007, more than two-thirds of the National Assembly (Lower House) and most of the key executive posts in the provinces were held by people from feudal background, according to scholar Sharif Shuja.

Explanations for the power of "feudal" landowning families that has waned in other post-colonial societies such as India include lack of land reform in Pakistan.

== Criticism and analysis ==
Critics of feudalism have complained of a culture of feudal impunity, where local police will refuse to pursue charges against an influential landowning family even when murder or mayhem have been committed; of abuse of power by some landlords who may place enemies in "private prisons" and "enslave" local people through debt bondage; the harming of progress and prosperity by feudals who discourage the education of their "subjects" for fear it will weaken feudal power; the giving of space to extremists who peasants turn to in the search for deliverance from the cruelty of feudal lords; and an agriculture sector made stagnant by absentee landlordism.

Others have complained that Pakistan has developed a "fixation" on feudalism (Michael Kugelman); that it has become a scapegoat for Pakistan's problems, frequently denounced but not seriously studied (Eqbal Ahmed); a "favorite boogie of the urban educated elites"; or that it does not exist because South Asia never developed large concentrations of land ownership or a feudal class, and what is called feudal in Pakistan is merely a "rural gentry", who are "junior partners" to those who actually hold power (Haider Nizamani). “Feudalism serves as the whipping boy of Pakistan’s intelligentsia. Yet, to my knowledge few serious studies have been published on the nature and extent of feudal power in Pakistan, and none to my knowledge on the hegemony which feudal culture enjoys in this country.” Nicolas Martin's work is in this respect an exception, although he argues that it is politically influential landlords, and not all landlords, who wield the despotic and arbitrary powers that are often attributed to the landed classes as a whole.

Despite its political influence, feudalism has become so unpopular in public expression and the media that "feudal lords" are denounced even by some from "feudal" families (such as Shehbaz Sharif).

In media portrayals, the very popular 1975 Pakistan Television (PTV) series Waris centered around a feudal lord (Chaudhry Hashmat) who rules his fiefdom, "with an iron grip".

== History ==
=== In Mughal Empire ===
"It was Akbar not the British colonizers who left us this parasitical curse". When the British first set foot on the Undivided India, the Mughals were in rule over most part of the region. As a part of their revenue administration was the mansabdari & jagirdari systems through which they regulated control over the land revenue of the country. This system, based on the previous local systems of feudalism dating way beyond the Islamic conquest & adapted by the local Islamic polities like the Delhi Sultanate, was introduced by Mughal Emperor Akbar largely based upon the land reforms of Sher Shah, and remained in place from the late 16th century till the fall of the Mughal Empire. A Brief History of British Land Acquisition in India

This acquisition of lands – and its pattern – determined the method of revenue collection that the colonial power opted for, beginning with the diwani, the first time the British gained the right to collect revenue from local land. In due time, with the introduction of the British Raj, they would stamp their legal authority over the Undivided India by introducing a number of reforms that would systematically create a new breed of intermediaries in the revenue system.

=== Under colonial rule ===
==== Difference from Modern Feudalism ====
Often criticized for being the root of Pakistan’s modern feudal system, the mansabdari system was in fact different in many essential ways. First and foremost, the system granted ownership on a non-hereditary transferable basis. The officials, mansabdars, who were granted the job of overseeing of the land, never owned their mansabs but were only granted a share of its earnings as a reward for their work. Thus, since they never owned the land, they did not have the right to pass it on to their offspring, either. The rights of ownership to the land had to renewed by obtaining firmans from the ruler. The ruler also had the right to dispossess the intermediaries from their land holdings due to reasons like displeasure or instigation of rebellion. Although land-ownership happened to be de facto hereditary, this technical non-ownership of land is the essential difference between modern feudalism and the Mughal mansabdari system. However, British land reforms like the Permanent Settlement, Mahalwari system & Ryotwari system made the possession of lands by the intermediaries as hereditary, mirroring the parallel systems in their own country, with the aim of creating a class of native landed gentry who would support imposition of colonial rule upon the peasants in order to serve their own interests.

For example, under British rule, the Chief of the Swati tribe, also known as the Khan of Agror, was the largest landlord in the NWFP (KPK) Province. In the 1907 settlement, he held 32,000 acres land in Mansehra District.

==== Mansabdars turn into Petty Chiefs ====
However, after the fall of the Mughal Empire, these mansabdars, turned into de facto hereditary landlords and petty chiefs of their mansabs. With the Mughal ruler gone, there was no one to stop them from doing so. But, sadly for them, soon enough, a new force was to gain control of their land – the British.

=== In independent Pakistan ===
Almost half of Pakistan's GDP and the bulk of its export earnings are derived from the agricultural sector, which is controlled by a few elite feudal families. Some of the most powerful feudal dynasties include the Jatoi, Zardari, Mazari, Mamdot, Noon, Tiwana, Bhutto, Mirani, Daultana, Ranjha, Zehri, Khar, Gillani, Qureshi, Makhdoom, Mulqani, Mehr, Khan, Laleka families each own thousands of acres of prime agricultural land with thousands of villagers living on and tending to the family land. The Jatoi, Mamdot and Daultana, family owns 45,000 acres of land and the Khan and Tiwana, families own 30,000 acres. Ranjha family of Kot Sher Muhammad, Khar family of Khar Gharbi, Noon family of Nurpur, Makhdoom and Mulqani families are smaller each owning between 6,000 and 12,000 acres of agricultural land. 12th Heredity Chief of Swati Tribe, Khan Wajhi Uz Zaman Khan Swati, also known as Khan of Agror owns 32,000 acres of land in Mansehra District and Torghar District making him the biggest landlord of Khyber Pakhtunkhwa while 16th Nawab of Allai, Prince Nawaz Khan Swati owns 29,250 acres of land in Allai District making him 2nd biggest tribal landlord in KPK. With this concentration of economic power, they also have considerable political power. During the land reforms in Pakistan, several large land-owning families in the Hazara Division of Khyber Pakhtunkhwa (KPK) were affected. Notably, the Swati Jagirdar family, among others in the region, faced redistribution of their lands as part of these reforms. The reforms aimed to alleviate land concentration and promote agricultural equity, impacting many prominent families in Hazara.

The leadership of the All India Muslim League was heavily dependent on the support of the various Muslim landed elites like Taluqdars, Zamindars, Chaudharys, Rajas, Rais, Malik, Tumandar, Jagirdars, Nawab, Zaildar, Sardars & Khans for support, which was clearly demonstrated in the 1937 elections. By the time of 1946 elections, the Muslim League was able to decisively obtain the support of the Muslim peasantry through mass mobilisation in the name of Islam through the Pakistan movement. Its successor, the Pakistan Muslim League, continued to be dominated by big landlords. Examples are

1. Liaquat Ali Khan - the 1st prime minister of Pakistan, was born to the Nawab family of Kunjpura in Karnal.
2. Khawaja Nazimuddin - the 2nd prime minister of Pakistan, who later succeeded Jinnah as governor-general, was a scion of the Nawab family of Dhaka.
3. Iskander Ali Mirza - the last governor general, who subsequently became Pakistan's first president, was a descendant of the Nawab family of Murshidabad.
4. Muhammad Ali Bogra - the 3rd prime minister of Pakistan, was a member of the Nawab family of Dhanbari in Dhaka.
5. Huseyn Shaheed Suhrawardy - the 4th prime minister of Pakistan, was a descendant of the Suhrawardy family which held the taluqdari of Chitwa in West Midnapore.
6. Feroz Khan Noon - the 5th prime minister of Pakistan, came from the aristocratic Muslim Rajput family that had extensive land holdings in Sargodha.
7. Iftikhar Hussain Khan Mamdot & Mumtaz Daultana - two leaders who served as chief ministers in Pakistan's most populous province of Punjab, had extensive land holdings. Hussain was the titular Nawab of Mamdot in Firozpur while Daultana was a rich landholder from Luddan.

The sole exception were the Jinnahs.

During the '50s and the '60s, the feudal families retained control over national affairs through the bureaucracy, industry and military. The increasing wealth inequality between the landed gentry and the peasantry under the dictatorship of Ayub Khan led to mass uprisings, led by socialist outfits like the Pakistan People's Party and the Awami League. In 1971, PPP leader Zulfikar Ali Bhutto, son of the diwan to the Nawab of Junagadh, assumed power as the prime minister and retained it until he was overthrown and executed by the military in 1977. Despite being a landowner himself, Bhutto passed land reform laws, restricting the amount of lands that could be held by a person and implementing redistribution of excess land to the tenant farmers. Bhutto's land reforms were widely denounced by Islamist outfits like the Jamaat-e-Islami and its leader Syed Abul Ala Maududi, who decried land reforms as being tantamount to communism. Under the Islamisation of Pakistan ushered in by Bhutto's successor, the military dictator Zia-ul-Haq, many dispossessed landowners were allowed to take back the lands that had been confiscated from them by the Bhutto administration. The Federal Shariat Court, created by Zia to enforce sharia, denounced land reform as bid'ah. Finally in 1989, a 5-member Shariat Appellate Bench of the Supreme Court, in a 3-to-2 decision, nullified all of Bhutto's land reforms in the landmark Qazalbash Waqf v Chief Land Commissioner case, bringing back land ownership to 1947 levels. 2 out of the 3 judges who branded the concept of land reforms as un-Islamic, were muftis practicing in the Federal Shariat Court, appointed by Zia. Bhutto's daughter Benazir Bhutto, who was the prime minister at that time, couldn't do anything in this matter, as the Constitution of Pakistan had been amended by Zia to make it illegal for the government to implement any 'un-Islamic' law. Hence landed aristocrats continue to dominate Pakistani politics owing to the Islamist opposition to land redistribution.

For example, a former Prime Minister of Pakistan, Yousuf Raza Gilani, is a major landowner from South Punjab (Multan) and from a long-standing political family. The former President Asif Ali Zardari is a large landowner from Sindh as well as the widower of Benazir Bhutto. Arif Nakai (former Chief Minister of Punjab) and Khurshid Mahmud Kasuri (Former Federal Minister) families have held power from decades in Kasur. Hamid Nasir Chattha's (former Speaker of the National Assembly of Pakistan) family has held power for decades in Gujranwala-Hafizabad districts as the Chief of the Chattha tribe. Khalid Mahmood Ranjha (MPA Provincial Parliamentary Secretary for Law and Parliamentary Affairs) and Mohsin Shahnawaz Ranjha (MNA former Federal Minister of State) family has held power for decades in Mandi Bahauddin District and Sargodha District as the Chief Ranjha family of Kot Sher Muhammad feudals. Hina Rabbani Khar (MNA former Federal Minister of Foreign Affairs) and Ghulam Mustafa Khar (MPA former Governor of Punjab) family has held power for decades in Muzaffargarh District as the Chief Khar family of Khar Gharbi feudal. Shah Mehmood Qureshi (MNA former Federal Minister of Foreign Affairs) hails from a prominent feudal Sufi family in Multan and is also followed as a religious saint.

Thus, large landowners have dominated Pakistan's politics since the country's inception.

=== Feudal Families Province wise ===
==== Punjab ====
- Nawabs of Bahawalpur
- Tiwana family of Shahpur
- Nawab Awans of Attock & Mianwali
- Maayr Minhas of Chakwal
- Nawab Khattars of Wah
- Sardars of Sindhanwalia
- Noons of Nurpur
- Ranjhas of Kot Sher Muhammad
- Bhatla Family of Kot Khan
- Nawab Sials of Jhang
- Family of Sardar Bahadur Sir Jogendra Singh
- Khars of Khar Gharbi
- Sardars of Attari(Geographically in India but this family had estates in Western Punjab too)
- Nawab Qureshi family
- Bedi Family of Kallar & Montgomery
- Chief Leghari family
- Chief Chattha family
- Singh family of Rawalpindi
- Family of Sir Ganga Ram of Lyallpur
- Chief Mazari family
- Chief Gurchani family
- Diwan family of Multan
- Sardars of Baharwal
- Syed family of Jhang
- Virks of Sheikhupura & Gujranwala
- Nayar Family of Sialkot
- Bajwa family of Narowal
- Badri Nath family of Multan
- Family of Diwan Bahadur Raja Narendra Nath
- Nakais, Mokals, and Kasuris of Kasur
- Dahas and Hirajs of Khanewal
- Sardars of Lamba
- Makhdoom family of Multan & Rahimyarkhan
- Malik family of Rawalpindi
- Singh family of Rawalpindi
- Laleka family of Bahawalnagar
- Laks & Badranas of Sargodha
- Tarars of Hafizabad
- Gillani's of Multan and Sahiwal
- Nawab of Mamdot
- Daultanas of Multan
- Khans of Isakhel, Mianwali
- Chief Awans of Chakwal
- Bukhsh-Arif Family (Pothwar)

==== KPK ====
- Wali-e-Swat family of Swat
- Stanikzai family of Kabal
- Tanoli Nawab of Amb and Phulra family of MULK-E-TANOL Region Hazara Division
- Tanoli Khans of Shinghri, Bir and Sherwan Family of MULK-E-TANOL Region Hazara Division
- Nawab of Hoti Mardan family
- Kapoor family of Peshawar
- Khanna family of Peshawar
- Chief Gandapur family
- Rai family of Dera Ismail Khan
- Family of Mal and Rai of Dera Ismail Khan
- Chief Khatak family of Nowshera
- Sardars of Haripur
- Chief Marwat family
- Nanda and Kohli Families of Abbottabad
- Sawhney family of Abbottabad
- Chand family of Dera Ismail Khan
- Nawab of Dir family
- Bhatias of Bannu and Dera Ismail Khan
- Family of Diwan Bhanju Ram Gandhi of Peshawar
- Nawab of Khanpur Family Hazara Division
- Sardars of Peshawar
- Arbab family of Peshawar
- Sherpao family
- Syeds of Kaghan
- Ayub Khan family of Hazara Division
- Nawab of Allai family (from Bebal Swati clan)
- Chief of Agror family (from Baigal Swati clan)
- Paracha and Khatris of Kohat
- Khans of Thakot and Paimal Sharif family (from Arghushal Swati clan)
- Khans of Mansehra family (from Jahangiri Swati clan)
- Khans of Balakot & Baffa family (from Sarkheli Swati clan)

==== Sindh ====
- Ranas of Amarkot
- The Talpur Mirs
- Chief Chandio family
- Chief Mahar family
- Chooharmal family of Larkana
- Chief Jatoi family
- Parwani Family of Mirpurkhas
- Diwan Baharsing Jagatsing Gidwani of Hyderabad
- Dewan Himath Sing & Mr. Mathradas of Hyderabad
- Pir of Pagaro family
- Tharani Family of Hyderabad
- Chief Bhutto Family
- Seth Pirbhdas Tolani of Larkana and Shahdadkot
- Madhodas family of Sukkur
- Chief Zardari Family
- Chief Mirza family
- Chief Gabol family
- Syed family of Nawabshah
- Chief Khuhro family
- Chief Wassan family
- Chief lound family

==== Balochistan ====
- The Khans of Kalat
- The Jams of Lasbela
- Bhagnari family of Kachhi and Bhag
- Sindhi family of Nasirabad
- Chief Bugti family
- Chief Marri family
- Diwan Bacha of Kalat
- Chief Raisani family
- Chief Sadozai family of Quetta
- Kalat and Mastung family
- Chief Magsi family of Jhal
- Chief Rind family
- Chief Jamali family
- Chief Mengal family
- Chief Barozai family
- Chief Raisani family
- Chief Umrani family

==== Azad Jammu & Kashmir (De Facto Provincial Status) ====
- Sultans of Muzaffarabad family (from Bomba tribe)
- Mahajan & Khatri families of Mirpur and Kotli
- Jiwan Singh family of Muzaffarabad and Domel
- Khatri family of Bhimber

== See also ==
- The State of Bonded Labor in Pakistan
- Indian feudalism
- Politics of Pakistan
- Agriculture in Pakistan § Land distribution and land reform
- Islamic economics in Pakistan § Land reform and Islamisation
- Murder of Nazim Jokhio
