= Rind =

Rind may refer to:

== Food ==
- Peel (fruit), or outer covering of any vegetable
- Pork rind
- The outer layer of cheese
- Candied rind; see Succade
- Grated rind; see Zest (ingredient)

== Other uses ==
- Rind (Baloch tribe), a tribe in Pakistan
- Rind (giantess), a giantess in Norse mythology
- Rind, Armenia, also Rrind
- Rind et al. controversy, about a study on child sexual abuse by lead author Bruce Rind
- RIND - acronym for reversible ischemic neurologic deficit
- Weathering rind of rocks and boulders
- Millrind, a support component for millstones

== People with the name ==
For other people with the name, see

- Abdost Rind (c. 1984 – 2011), Pakistani reporter
- Clementina Rind (ca. 1740 – 1774), American newspaper publisher
- Mir Chakar Rind (1468 – 1565), Baloch chieftain

== See also ==
- Rynd (disambiguation)
