= Abdul Razzaq Baloch =

Abdul Razzaq Baloch may refer to:

- Abdul Razzaq Baloch (cyclist)
- Abdul Razzaq Baloch (journalist)
