= Nasrullah Gadani =

Pakistani journalist

- نصر الله گڏاڻي
- Born: 1984; Mirpur Mathelo, Sindh, Pakistan
- Died: 24 May 2024 (aged 40); Karachi, Sindh, Pakistan
- Cause of death: Assassination
- Occupations: Journalist; Social Media Activist
- Employer: Daily Awami Awaz
- Known for: Activism against feudal hegemony in Sindh.

Nasrullah Gadani (Sindhi: نصر الله گڏاڻي) was a Pakistani journalist and social media activist, renowned for his work in Sindhi language. He fervently opposed the feudal lords of Sindh, voicing his activism both through print and digital media. In May 2024, he was shot dead by unknown assailants.

== Early life ==
Nasrullah Gadani was born in the village of Qabool Gadani near Mirpur Mathelo in the Sindh province of Pakistan. He belonged to a poor family and only got basic education.

== Career ==
Gadani began his journalistic career with the Sindhi language newspaper, Awami Awaz, with which he remain associated until his death. He later used to go 'live' on YouTube in a form of spot reporting. He campaigned for access to education, end of feudal hegemony, and environmental conservation. He was arrested in May 2023 for exposing the corruption of a local judge before being subsequently released at the intervention of a regional organisation working for the safety of journalists.

=== "Bhotar, my foot" ===
In the aftermath of the 2022 Pakistan floods, Gadani rode his motorbike through the inundated streets of his hometown, asserting in his live broadcast, "O people of the town, you can see the faces of your elected assembly members in these dirty and disease-borne waters." Instead of a registration plate on the back of his motorcycle, he inscribed the words "Bhotar My Foot" (Sindhi, "Masters, my foot"). The slogan became a top trend on Sindhi social media.

=== Lund incident ===
One of his last exposes was doing a live broadcast on the protocol given to Shahbaz Lund, the son of a local MP. On his motorbike, he rode beside the motorcade and questioned how a non-entity like Lund could get an official police protocol. He was subsequently fired at by Lund's guards before he managed to escape.

== Assassination ==
In the morning of 21 May 2024, Gadani was making his way to the Mirpur Mathelo Press Club, of which he was president, on his motorbike when he was targeted by 3 assailants in a car. He was shot three times in the chest and abdomen, and was immediately taken to the local hospital for emergency first aid. After that he was transported to the Sheikh Zayed Hospital across the nearby regional border into Punjab. With his condition worsening, Gadani was airlifted to the Agha Khan Hospital in Karachi, where he succumbed to his injuries on 24 May 2024.

Gadani's body was brought to his hometown via ambulance, along the way it was stopped several times by students and onlookers to shower it with rose petals in a sign of respect for the slain journalist. His funeral was attended by thousands of locals and he was laid to rest later in the day. Over the past 4 years, Gadani was the 13th journalist who was killed in Sindh, the highest number across Pakistan.

== Investigation ==
Gadani's family, including his mother and two close relatives, maintain that he was killed on the orders of the local MP, Khalid Khan Lund, and his son, town mayor, Shahbaz Lund. The family also named Lund's second son, Noor Muhammad Lund, in their statement and decried that the local police had not included their names in the First information report (FIR) because they were powerful and belong to the ruling Pakistan Peoples Party. The family was only able to record their statement 40 days after the murder of Gadani.

On 1 June 2024, local activists moved the Sindh High Court to form a judicial commission to probe the murder of Gadani and expressed mistrust on the ongoing official investigation.

On 10 June 2024, Sindh police claimed to have arrested one of the culprits, Asghar Lund, and recovered the murder weapon from him.

== See also ==
- Freedom of the press in Pakistan
  - Violence against journalists in Pakistan
- Murder of Nazim Jokhio
- Censorship in Pakistan
