= Abdul Haq Baloch =

Abdul Haq Baloch may refer to:

- Abdul Haq Baloch (journalist) (1978–2012), Pakistani TV journalist
- Abdul Haq Baloch (politician) (1947–2010), Pakistani Islamic scholar and politician
