= Saleem Shahzad =

Pakistani investigative journalist (1970–2011)

Syed Saleem Shahzad
- Born: 3 November 1970; Karachi, Pakistan
- Died: 30 May 2011 (aged 40); Mandi Bahauddin, Pakistan
- Cause of death: Torture
- Body discovered: Upper Jhelum canal
- Citizenship: Pakistan
- Education: Government National College; Karachi University
- Occupation: Journalist
- Employer(s): Asia Times Online; Adnkronos
- Known for: Exposing links between ISI and Al-Qaeda
- Title: Pakistan Bureau Chief
- Spouse: Anita Ameer
- Children: Syed Fahad Saleem; Amna Saleem; Syed Rehman Shah (previously Abdullah Saleem)

Syed Saleem Shahzad (Urdu: سید سلیم شہزاد, 3 November 1970 – 30 May 2011) was a Pakistani investigative journalist who wrote widely for leading European and Asian media. He served as the Pakistan Bureau Chief of Asia Times Online (Hong Kong) and Italian news agency Adnkronos (AKI).

He was kidnapped in May 2011 and found dead the next day in a canal in north-east Pakistan, showing signs of torture. Human Rights Watch (HRW) accused the Pakistan intelligence services of being behind his killing, and Obama Administration officials using CIA intelligence later announced that they had "reliable and conclusive" intelligence that this was the case. Pakistan's Inter-Services Intelligence (ISI) denied the accusations and called them "totally unfounded".

== Family and background ==
Syed Saleem Shahzad was born in Karachi on 3 November 1970. He was the eldest among the three siblings with one younger brother Waseem Fawad and his younger sibling Mariam Shamim. He eventually married Anita Ameer with whom he fathered three children, Syed Fahad Saleem, Amna Saleem and Syed Rehman Shah (previously named Abdullah Saleem). Shahzad's ethnic background can be traced back to Uttar Pradesh, India, and belonged to the Syed Wasti lineage.

Shahzad always had a keen interest in politics. Shahzad earned a Master of Arts in International Relations from the University of Karachi. While in college, Shahzad was a member of Jamaat-e-Islami's student wing but later stopped supporting the group as too radical.

== Career ==
Syed Saleem Shahzad covered a variety of topics through his career, including global security issues, Pakistani armed forces, Islamic movements, and Muslim resistance movements in Lebanon and Iraq. The Taliban and al-Qaeda were the regular topics of his writing. He was an international journalist who travelled widely in the Middle East, Asia and Europe. He also wrote for Le Monde diplomatique (France), La Stampa (Italy) and Dawn (Pakistan). He was South Asia Correspondent for Italian news agency Adnkronos International (AKI). His opinion pieces appeared in the Qatari-based Islamonline.net and Boston Review.

He regularly interviewed Islamist militants, including al-Qaeda members. Shahzad introduced the world to hitherto unknown al-Qaeda figures, including Sheikh Essa. He had interviewed several leading militants long before they became internationally known, including Sirajuddin Haqqani and Qari Ziaur Rahman. He also interviewed Ilyas Kashmiri shortly after Ilyas was appointed chief of Al-Qaeda's military committee.

His last book Inside Al-Qaeda and the Taliban: Beyond Bin Laden and 9/11, was published shortly before his death.

Shahzad's work was regularly reproduced in Pakistani English dailies including the Daily Times, the Nation and The Post, and in Urdu newspapers such as Daily Mashriq and Daily Aaj. His articles were reproduced in many English dailies in Afghanistan and Bangladesh, as well as in local-language dailies. His work was often quoted in the US, Canadian press.

Saleem was an associate of the Pakistan Security Research Unit of the department of Peace Studies of the University of Bradford. In November 2006, he was held in Taliban captivity in the Helmand Province of Afghanistan for a few days. He wrote a detailed account of his days in captivity and time he spent with the Taliban in a series, "In the Land of the Taliban" published in Asia Times Online.

Just prior to his disappearance in May 2011, the journalist wrote in the Asia Times Online that al-Qaeda carried out the PNS Mehran attack after negotiations with the Navy for the release of officials, suspected of al-Qaeda links, had failed. According to Shahzad, the attackers were all from Ilyas Kashmiri's 313 Brigade of al-Qaeda.

== Awards and honours ==
In June 2011, Shahzad was awarded the Ischia International Journalism Award in a unanimous decision by the jury. The annual prize honours excellence in journalism.

Shahzad's name has been added to the Journalists Memorial at the Newseum in Washington, D.C.

Pakistan Press Foundation (PPF) on the occasion of World Press Freedom Day announced the annual PPF-Aslam Ali Press Freedom Award-2012 for the slain journalist Syed Saleem Shahzad. The Alfred Friendly Press Fellowships (AFPF) and the Pakistani Press Foundation (PPF) announced the Daniel Pearl-Saleem Shahzad Fellowship in 2012 that would train up to 15 Pakistani reporters in conflict and investigative reporting as well as safety for journalists working in conflict-affected regions. A fellow from Pakistan was being chosen for this fellowship that honors an American and a Pakistani journalist killed in the line of duty while covering a common war against terror in Pakistan.

In a protest to mark the International Day to End Impunity for Crimes against Journalists, international organisation Reporters Without Borders (RSF) on Monday renamed 12 streets in Paris after journalists who have been murdered, tortured or disappeared. One of the streets has been named after Shahzad as Rue Syed Saleem Shahzad.

== Death ==
According to friends and colleagues, the ISI warned the journalist at least three times prior to his death. In October 2010, Shahzad was summoned to ISI headquarters the day after publishing a sensitive article on Abdul Ghani Baradar's capture. Afterwards he wrote to Human Rights Watch (HRW) predicting that he might be detained by Pakistan's Inter-Services Intelligence (ISI) agency. According to HRW's Ali Dayan Hasan, he was "fairly sure that sooner or later something was going to happen". Shahzad informed Hasan in an email that he was threatened by an ISI official who had said: "I must give you a favor. We have recently arrested a terrorist and recovered a lot of data, diaries and other material during the interrogation. The terrorist had a list with him. If I find your name in the list, I will certainly let you know." In a June 2011 opinion piece for The News International, journalist Ahmed Quraishi stated the "agency's version is very straightforward: they met Shahzad at a registered government office about a story he did and asked him either to confirm his sources or retract the story because it damaged Pakistani interests." Nine days prior to his disappearance, Shahzad met with American journalist Dexter Filkins and told him, "Look, I'm in danger... I've got to get out of Pakistan."

Shahzad disappeared on the evening of 29 May 2011 in Islamabad. He reportedly left his home around 5:30 pm local time that evening to take part in a TV show scheduled for 6:00 pm, but at 5:42 pm his cell phone was switched off and he failed to arrive at the television bureau. A complaint was lodged with the police the following morning. Elsewhere that morning, a labourer found his body, still wearing a suit, a tie and shoes, in the Upper Jhelum Canal while the zamindar of an upstream village notified police of an abandoned Toyota Corolla that later proved to be Shahzad's.

On the next day, his family members from Islamabad confirmed that he was dead, with police stating that his body had been found in a canal in Mandi Bahauddin district and his car found at Sarai Alamgir in Pakistan's northern Gujrat District, some 150 km (93 mi) south-east of the capital. His car was found about 10 km (six miles) away.

Pakistani Prime Minister Yusuf Raza Gilani ordered an immediate inquiry into the kidnapping and murder, and on 3 June Pakistan's Interior Minister Rehman Malik duly announced an investigative judicial commission headed by a Supreme Court justice. Bowing to unprecedented demonstrations from Pakistani media, PM Gilani signed an order in the early morning hours of 18 June 2011 establishing a judicial commission, led by Justice Main Saqib Nisar, to investigate the circumstances surrounding Shazad's death. The commission was to release its findings within six weeks.

The New York Times reported on 4 July 2011 that CIA and Obama administration officials had "reliable and conclusive" intelligence that implicated senior officials of the ISI in directing the death of Shahzad. Subsequently, Admiral Michael Mullen stated that he believed that Shahzad's killing was "sanctioned by the [Pakistani] government" but added that he did not have a "string of evidence" linking the ISI. The Pakistani state-run news agency, Associated Press of Pakistan, said the soon-to-retire Mullen's charge was "extremely irresponsible." The Associated Press report of the APP comment went on to say:

Pakistan was the deadliest country for journalists in 2010, with at least eight killed in the line of duty, according to the New York-based Committee to Protect Journalists. Six died in suicide attacks, the group said in a report late last year. Despite the dangers, the media establishment in Pakistan has expanded rapidly over the past decade, and reporters here operate with freedoms denied in most developing countries. Still, many privately admit to getting occasional pressure from security and intelligence officials.

The ISI strongly denied any involvement in Shahzad's death. Two days after his body was found, the intelligence agency released an official statement that described the death as "unfortunate and tragic" while maintaining that "baseless accusations against the country's sensitive agencies for their alleged involvement in Shahzad's murder are totally unfounded."

=== Judicial commission investigation ===
A judicial commission led by Justice Saqib Nisar finalised its report investigating the circumstances around Shahzad's death on 9 January 2012 and to Prime Minister on 10 January 2012. The report blamed "various belligerents in the war on terror which included the Pakistani state and non-state actors such as the Taliban and Al Qaeda and foreign actors" but stopped short of blaming any single individual or organisation.

HRW alleged that commission's failure to name a suspect demonstrated "the ability of the ISI to remain beyond the reach of Pakistan's criminal justice system." Members of the Media Commission of Pakistan (MCP) and South Asian Free Media Association (SAFMA) also expressed concerns over the commission's findings and suggested parliamentary oversight of the ISI.

An exclusive article was published by the Asian Human Rights Commission, where William Nicholas Gomes, has exposed many unanswered question related to his death.

== See also ==
- Violence against journalists in Pakistan
- List of kidnappings
