= Abdul Hakeem Baloch =

Pakistani politician

- عبدالحکیم بلوچ

Member of the National Assembly of Pakistan
- Incumbent
- Assumed office 29 February 2024
- Preceded by: Jamil Ahmed Khan
- Constituency: NA-231 Karachi Malir-III
- In office 24 October 2022 – 10 August 2023
- Preceded by: Jamil Ahmed Khan
- Constituency: NA-237 Karachi Malir-II
- In office 14 December 2016 – 31 May 2018
- Preceded by: Abdul Hakeem Baloch
- Constituency: NA-258 Karachi -XX
- In office 1 June 2013 – 14 December 2016
- Preceded by: Sher Muhammad Baloch
- Constituency: NA-258 Karachi -XX

Minister of State for Communication
- In office 5 June 2014 – September 2016
- President: Mamnoon Hussain
- Prime Minister: Nawaz Sharif

Personal details
- Born: Karachi, Sindh, Pakistan
- Party: IPP (2026-present)
- Other political affiliations: PPP (2016-2026); PMLN (2013-2016)

Abdul Hakeem Baloch (Urdu: عبد الحکیم بلوچ) is a Pakistani politician who has been a member of National Assembly of Pakistan since February 2024. He also served as MNA from 2013 to 2016, from 2016 to 2018 and from October 2022 till August 2023.

== Education ==
He has done bachelors.

== Political career ==
He began his political career with Pakistan Peoples Party and served as a provincial minister of Sindh.

He was elected to the National Assembly of Pakistan from NA-258 (Karachi-XX) on ticket of Pakistan Muslim League (N) in the 2013 Pakistani general election.

In 2013, he was made the Minister of State for Railways before being appointed as Minister of State for Communication in the Cabinet of Prime Minister Nawaz Sharif.

In 2016, he quit PML-N and rejoined Pakistan Peoples Party and resigned from the National Assembly seat that he won on PML-N ticket.

He ran for the seat of National Assembly from NA-258 (Karachi-XX) on ticket of PPP in by-election held in 2016 and retained the seat.

He ran for the NA-237 Malir seat on the ticket of Pakistan Peoples Party in the by-election held in October 2022 and won the elections by getting 32567 votes.
