= Murder of Nazim Jokhio =

High-profile murder case in Sindh, Pakistan

Nazim Jokhio murder case (Sindhi: ناظم جوکيو جو قتل) is a high-profile murder case in Sindh, Pakistan. Jam Abdul Karim Bijar a member of the National assembly (MNA) from NA-236 (Malir-I) torched and brutally murdered Nazim Sajawal Jokhio, in Salar Kot, Sindh on 3 November 2021.

Bijar flew to Dubai immediately after the murder and was declared absconded by the Malir judicial magistrate on 27 January 2022. The case was transferred to Anti Terrorism Court on 7 February 2022 On 12 January 2023, court acquitted Jam Awais Bijar Khan Jokhio and others after an out-of-court settlement.

== Background ==
Before the murder, Nazim Jokhio filmed Pakistan Peoples Party's MNA Jam Abdul Karim Bijar and foreigners hunting houbara bustard, an endangered species of migratory bird in Pakistan, in the Thatta district, Sindh. Jokhio was threatened to remove the video or to face the consequences. According to Jokhio's brother, he refused to delete the video. Jokhio stated on video, the night before his murder, that he was getting death threats from Bijar.

Nazim Jokhio was killed after being tortured in a farmhouse near Malir's Jam Goth area, belonging to Bijar. Autopsy revealed several torture marks and reflected that he sustained trauma before death; including on his genital area.

Police did not act on the incident due to the influential nature of MNA, before there was uproar on social media on 5 November 2021. The suspected murderer, Bijar, along with his brother was able to escape the country and reach Dubai before the police could reach them.

== Investigation and trial ==
A case was booked on Anti Terrorism Court of Pakistan against MNA Jam Abdul Karim Bijar, Pakistan Peoples Party Member of provincial assembly Jam Awais and the other five suspects. The MNA came back to Pakistan to participate in no-confidence motion against Imran Khan, however, he arranged prior protective bail.

In the turn of events Jokhio's widow pardoned Jam Abdul Karim Bijar, however, before this Jokhio's brother Afzal Jokhio also withdrew case against influential Pakistan Peoples Party's MNA under pressure.

Other nominees in Nazim Jokhio's case including the brother of Jam Abdul Karim, and member of Sindh Assembly Jam Awais, and his guards acquitted by count after an out-of-court settlement on 12 January 2023.

== See also ==
- Freedom of the press in Pakistan
- Nasrullah Gadani
- Censorship in Pakistan
