= Sher Muhammad Baloch =

Pakistani politician (died 2023)

- شیر محمد بلوچ

Member of the National Assembly of Pakistan
- In office 2002–2013
- Succeeded by: Abdul Hakeem Baloch
- Constituency: NA-258 (Karachi-XX)

Personal details
- Died: 18 June 2023

Sher Muhammad Baloch (died 18 June 2023) was a Pakistani politician who was a member of the National Assembly of Pakistan from 2002 to 2013.

== Political career ==
Baloch was elected to the National Assembly of Pakistan from Constituency NA-258 (Karachi-XX) as a candidate of Pakistan Peoples Party (PPP) in the 2002 Pakistani general election. He received 38,225 votes and defeated Abdul Hakeem Baloch.

Baloch was re-elected to the National Assembly from Constituency NA-258 (Karachi-XX) as a candidate of PPP in the 2008 Pakistani general election. He received 134,696 votes and defeated Nisar Ahmed Shar, a candidate of Muttahida Qaumi Movement (MQM).

== Death ==
Sher Muhammad Baloch died on 18 June 2023.
