= Violence against journalists in Pakistan =

Persistent threats, attacks, and killings of journalists in Pakistan

Violence against journalists in Pakistan refers to the surge in killings, abductions, assaults, threats, and enforced disappearances targeting media workers in Pakistan, encompassing a long history of threats, assaults, abductions, and killings targeting media workers. Since the 1990s, dozens of journalists have been killed in connection with their work, often with impunity for perpetrators. International organisations such as Committee to Protect Journalists (CPJ) have described Pakistan as one of the most dangerous countries for journalists, with high levels of impunity for perpetrators. They have consistently rank Pakistan poorly in press freedom indices due to violence from militant groups, political actors, and alleged state involvement. The pattern includes targeted murders, enforced disappearances, and online harassment, contributing to widespread self-censorship.

Since the beginning dozens of journalist killings, online harassment campaigns, and restrictions on reporting, contributing to widespread self-censorship. As of 2025, Pakistan ranks 158th in World Press Freedom Index.

== Background ==
Pakistan has long been considered one of the world's most dangerous countries for journalists, with historical issues of violence linked to militant groups, political pressures, and security forces. Violence against journalists in Pakistan dates back to the 1990s, with sporadic attacks amid political instability and sectarian tensions. The early 2000s saw a surge following the US-led invasion of Afghanistan and rising militancy, exemplified by the 2002 kidnapping and murder of Wall Street Journal reporter Daniel Pearl by militants.

The 2010s marked Pakistan as one of the deadliest countries for the press, with peaks in 2010 and 2011 linked to conflict reporting and political coverage. Notable cases include the 2011 murder of investigative journalist Saleem Shahzad, allegedly involving state intelligence, and the killing of Geo TV reporter Wali Khan Babar amid ethnic tensions in Karachi.

The 2020s saw an escalation, particularly following political upheavals such as the 2022 ouster of Prime Minister Imran Khan and increased militant activity in border regions.

The threats included coordinated online harassment, especially against women journalists, and physical attacks. According to a report in The Guardian, by the middle of the decade, fatalities increased, and 2024 became one of the deadliest years on record.

== Killings and physical attacks ==
Since 1992, the Committee to Protect Journalists has documented over 60 work-related journalist killings in Pakistan, with many more reported by local organisations. High-profile incidents include targeted shootings for reporting on militancy, corruption, or politics.

The 2020s have seen a significant rise in journalist murders, with at least 20–30 confirmed work-related killings by 2025. In 2024 alone, multiple journalists were killed in targeted attacks, including Nasrullah Gadani, Kamran Dawar, and others, often linked to their reporting on local politics, militancy, or corruption.

Physical assaults and threats have also increased, with incidents involving mobs, political supporters, and unidentified assailants.

== Enforced disappearances and abductions ==
Journalists have faced abductions and enforced disappearances, often attributed to security agencies or non-state actors. According to a repoert by the United States Department of State, these incidents contribute to a climate of fear, forcing some media workers into hiding or exile.

== Online harassment and censorship ==
Coordinated online campaigns, including death and rape threats, have targeted journalists, especially women and those critical of authorities. Laws such as amendments to the Prevention of Electronic Crimes Act have been used to restrict reporting.

== Impunity and international response ==
Impunity remains widespread, with few convictions in journalist killings. Organisations like CPJ, RSF, HRW, and Amnesty International have called for investigations and protections.
