= Razzaq Gul =

Pakistani journalist

- Born: Abdul Razzaq Gul; 1977?
- Disappeared: 18 May 2012 (age 35); Turbat, returning home after evening at local press club
- Status: Found: murdered, tortured
- Died: 19 May 2012; Turbat, Pakistan
- Cause of death: Murder
- Body discovered: Next day, near hospital in different part of city
- Resting place: Singhania Sar
- Occupation: Journalist
- Years active: 10 years
- Employer: Express News
- Organization: Baloch National Movement

Razzaq Gul (1977(?) – 19 May 2012) was a senior Pakistani journalist covering war and politics for Express News in Turbat, Pakistan who was abducted on 18 May 2012 and his dead body was found the following day. According to the Committee to Protect Journalists, Razzaq Gul was a member of the Baloch National Movement, a nationalist political organization, and was the secretary of the Press Club of Turbat, according to news reports. His colleagues at the press club stated that Gul had not mentioned receiving any threats. No group claimed responsibility for his murder.

Razzaq Gul was the 22nd journalist to have been murdered in the area of Balochistan, listed as one of the most dangerous places for reporters in Pakistan, over a four-year period, and he was one of eight Pakistani journalists killed since Jan 2011.

== Personal ==
Razzaq Gul, 35, native of Pakistan, was taken against his will and executed while working as a journalist in Turbat, Pakistan. After being identified by his brother, Gul was buried in his hometown of Singhania Sir.

== Career ==
Razzaq Gul was a television journalist covering war and politics for at least 10 years for Express News in the Balochistan province in Turbat, Pakistan. Gul was the secretary of the Press Club located in Turbat and he was a member of the nationalist political organisation, Baloch National Movement

== Death ==
Razzaq Gul was taken after leaving a press club on his way home on 18 May 2012. His body was found the next morning, 19 May 2012, with at least 15 bullet holes and evidence of torture. The unknown assailants discarded the body close to the Old Civil Hospital located in Turbat.

The red shaded area is Balochistan, Pakistan, one of the four provinces of Pakistan. Mentioned locations within Pakistan relative to the capital Islamabad and the largest city Karachi.

== Impact ==
Due to the violence in the Balochistan province, many reporters are scared to speak out. Razzaq Gul continued to report the facts even though journalists were being persecuted in his home country. Journalists are being targeted and murdered as a way to keep them from reporting the truth about the violent situation in this area of Pakistan. Research has placed Pakistan at the top of the list for countries posing the most danger to journalists . Since 2008, there have been at least 27 reporters and news personnel executed in Pakistan.

== Reactions ==
Reaction to Razzaq Gul's murder was strong and swift. Owais Aslam Ali, secretary general of Pakistan Press International, said journalists in Balochistan need protection to make it possible for them to report the facts as it has become almost impossible for them to do their jobs. Balochistan Union of Journalists called for a mourning period of three days which began 1 June 2012 Demonstrations took place in Turbat and surrounding areas with shops closing and protestors marching as they chanted for Gul's murderers to be brought to justice. The protesters said they did not want Razzaq Gul or any other innocent civilian or media worker to be just another name on a list of the dead that goes unsolved.

Irina Bokova, director-general of UNESCO, said, "I condemn the killings of Abdul Razaq Gul and Aurengzeb Tunio who died alongside two companions. I urge the authorities to investigate these killings. It is essential for freedom of expression and for good governance that those responsible for the death of journalists be brought to justice." Other human rights groups called on Pakistani authorities to thoroughly investigate Gul's killing and bring the unknown assailants to justice, and the Acting Inspector General of Police Hussain Karar Khwaja initiated an investigation.

== See also ==
List of journalists killed during the Balochistan conflict (1947-Present)
