= NA-231 Karachi Malir-III =

Constituency of the National Assembly of Pakistan

- Constituency for the National Assembly of Pakistan
- Region: Ibrahim Hyderi Town (partly), Airport, Malir Cantonment, Murad Memon Town (partly) and Faisal Cantonment (partly) of Malir District in Karachi
- Electorate: 342,427

Current constituency
- Created: 2018
- Party: Pakistan People's Party
- Member: Abdul Hakeem Baloch
- Created from: NA-257 Karachi-XIX

NA-231 Karachi Malir-III (این اے-231، کراچی ملیر-3) is a newly created constituency for the National Assembly of Pakistan. It mainly comprises the Airport Subdivision, Malir Cantonment, and first 5 of 7 Census Circles of Faisal Cantonment. It was created in the 2018 delimitation from the bifurcation of the old NA-257.

== Assembly Segments ==
Constituency number	Constituency	District	Current MPA	Party
88	PS-88 Karachi Malir-V	Malir District	Ajaz Khan Swati	PPP
89	PS-89 Karachi Malir-VI	Malir District	Muhammad Saleem Baloch	PPP

== Members of Parliament ==
=== 2018–2023: NA-237 Karachi Malir-II ===
Election	Member	Party
2018	Jamil Ahmed Khan	PTI
2022	Abdul Hakeem Baloch	PPP

=== 2024–present: NA-231 Karachi Malir-III ===
Election	Member	Party
2024	Abdul Hakeem Baloch	PPP

== Election 2018 ==
General elections were held on 25 July 2018.

General election 2018: NA-237 Karachi Malir-II
Party	Candidate	Votes	%	±%
PTI	Jamil Ahmed Khan	33,289	27.78	
PPP	Abdul Hakeem Baloch	31,907	26.63	
MQM-P	Nadeem Maqbool	14,251	11.90	
PML(N)	Zainul Abideen Ansari	14,000	11.69	
TLP	Faheem Ahmed Hussaini	11,660	9.74	
MMA	Muhammad Islam	6,141	5.13	
Others	Others (ten candidates)	6,327	5.30	
Turnout		119,870	42.23	
Rejected ballots		2,184	1.83	
Majority		1,382	1.15	
Registered electors		283,882		
PTI gain from MQM-P				

== By-election 2022 ==
A by-election was held on 16 October 2022 due to the resignation of Jamil Ahmed Khan, the previous MNA from this seat.

By-election 2022: NA-237 Karachi Malir-II
Party	Candidate	Votes	%	±%
PPP	Abdul Hakeem Baloch	32,567	55.14	▲28.51
PTI	Imran Khan	22,493	38.08	▲10.30
TLP	Samiullah Khan	2,956	5.00	▼4.74
PSP	Muhammad Amir Shaikhani	279	0.47	▼0.76
JUI (F)	Muhammad Ismail	221	0.37	N/A
Others	Others (six candidates)	550	0.93	
Turnout		59,902	20.33	▼21.90
Rejected ballots		836	1.40	▼0.43
Majority		10,074	17.06	▲15.91
Registered electors		294,699		
PPP gain from PTI				

== Election 2024 ==
General elections were held on 8 February 2024. Abdul Hakeem Baloch won the election with 43,634 votes.

General election 2024: NA-231 Karachi Malir-III
Party	Candidate	Votes	%	±%
PPP	Abdul Hakeem Baloch	43,634	33.54	▼21.60
PTI	Khalid Mehmood Ali (Note: Filed nomination papers as PTI candidate but ECP allowed him to run as an Independent)	43,245	33.24	▼4.84
JI	Umar Farooq	14,143	10.87	N/A
PML(N)	Jamil Ahmed Khan	9,999	7.69	N/A
TLP	Muhammad Ismail Hussaini	7,308	5.62	▲0.62
Others	Others (twenty candidates)	11,752	9.03	
Turnout		132,568	38.71	▲18.38
Total valid votes		130,081	98.12	
Rejected ballots		2,487	1.88	
Majority		389	0.30	▼16.76
Registered electors		342,427		
PPP hold				

== See also ==
- NA-230 Karachi Malir-II
- NA-232 Karachi Korangi-I
