= Jamil Ahmed Khan (politician) =

Pakistani politician

Member of the National Assembly of Pakistan
- In office 13 August 2018 – 28 July 2022
- Succeeded by: Abdul Hakeem Baloch
- Constituency: NA-237 (Malir-II)

Personal details
- Born: Karachi, Sindh, Pakistan
- Party: PMLN (2023-present)
- Other political affiliations: PTI (2018-2023)

Jamil Ahmed Khan (جمیل احمد خان) is a Pakistani politician who had been a member of National Assembly of Pakistan from August 2018 to July 2022.

== Political career ==
He was elected to the National Assembly of Pakistan from Constituency NA-237 (Malir-II) as a candidate of Pakistan Tehreek-e-Insaf in the 2018 Pakistani general election.

On 27 September 2018, Prime Minister Imran Khan appointed him as Federal Parliamentary Secretary for Maritime Affairs.

=== Resignation ===
On April 10, 2022, he resigned from the National Assembly on the orders of Imran Khan. The new government did not accept the resignations of many members for fear of deteriorating the number of members. However, accepting the resignations of eleven members on July 28, 2022, one of them was Jamil Ahmed Khan. Later, by-elections were held again on his seat, Imran Khan made a surprising move to stand on his own in all the by-seats.

== More Reading ==
- List of members of the 15th National Assembly of Pakistan
