= Javed Naseer Rind =

Pakistani journalist (died 2011)

- Born: Javed Naseer Rind
- Died: 5 November 2011; Khuzdar, Central Balochistan, Pakistan
- Body discovered: Ghazgi Chowk
- Other names: Javid Naseer Rind, Javeed Nasir Rind
- Occupations: Senior-sub editor & columnist
- Employer: Daily Tawar (Urdu language)
- Movement: Baloch National Movement

Javed Naseer Rind (died 5 November 2011) was an Urdu-language editor and columnist for the Daily Tawar and an active member of the Baloch National Movement. He was abducted 10 September 2011 and his corpse was discovered 5 November 2011 in Balochistan, Pakistan.

== Early history ==
Rind was an editor and columnist for the Urdu-language Daily Tawar, which is known as a pro-independence and anti-government newspaper based in Quetta. Rind was an active member of the Baloch National Movement, as were other employees of the Daily Tawar, and he was a coordinator for his local. A London-based source said that Rind had been fired and lost his position within the movement when he had been in communication with him while reporting on the UK trial of Hyrbyair Marri and Faiz Baluch on charges of terrorism.

== Death ==
Places in Balochistan, Pakistan, where journalists have been killed. The red shaded area is Balochistan, one of the four provinces of Pakistan. Mentioned locations within Pakistan relative to the capital Islamabad and the largest city Karachi.

According to his nephew who was an eyewitness, Javed Naseer Rind was abducted by gunpoint and forcibly disappeared along with Rind's relative Abdul Samad Baloch near his home in Hub City, Lasbela District, Balochistan, Pakistan on 10 September 2011. After his disappearance, Balochistan Union of Journalists requested government intervention. His corpse was found 5 November 2011 near Ghazgi Chowk, Khuzdar, and his corpse had multiple bullet wounds, showed evidence of torture, and was found with a slip of paper identifying him as the journalist who had been previously kidnapped. His corpse was then transported to the civil hospital in Khuzdar for an autopsy.

== Context ==
Balochistan is a resource rich region of Pakistan with an active separatist movement that has caused conflict between Pakistan and the terrorist within the region. The Balochistan conflict has created an unstable environment for journalists as they receive pressure from the nationalist groups about the coverage given to the other side. Journalists are often the target of death threats. By 2012, between 28 and 33 journalists were killed in Balochistan. Rind is among the 22 journalists between 2008 and 2012 who have become casualties of the Balochistan conflict. In 2010, Balochistan was considered the most dangerous place for journalists with six out of ninety seven deaths worldwide. In 2011, Rind's death pushed the count to over ten deaths. Nationwide, he was one of 12 Pakistani journalists killed in 2011 and one of around 23 Pakistani journalists killed from the beginning of 2010 to the end of 2011. Regionwide, he was one of 19 killed in 2011 in Afghanistan, Pakistan, and India, according to the South Asian Free Media Association.

== Impact ==
Following Rind's death the Balochistan Union of Journalists has requested a high level committee be put together by the government to investigate his death as well as the death of numerous colleagues.

== Reactions ==
In Pakistan, the Baluchistan Union of Journalists issued a condemnation after his abduction. A spokesperson for Committee to Protect Journalists joined with the Balochistan Union of Journalists and called for Rind's journalism to be investigated as motive for the abduction.

Reporters Without Borders and International Federation of Journalists have also spoken out against Rind's death. A spokesperson for IFJ said, "Authorities must act swiftly to end this cycle of violence and impunity in what is statistically one of the most dangerous places in the world to be a journalist."

The Pakistan Federal Union of Journalists is educating journalists about how to react when they receive threats and the support they can get as a result.

== See also ==
- List of journalists killed during the Balochistan conflict (1947–present)
