= Rock-cut Church of Rind =

Medieval religious structure in Armenia

Coordinates: 39°48′04″N 45°09′38″E

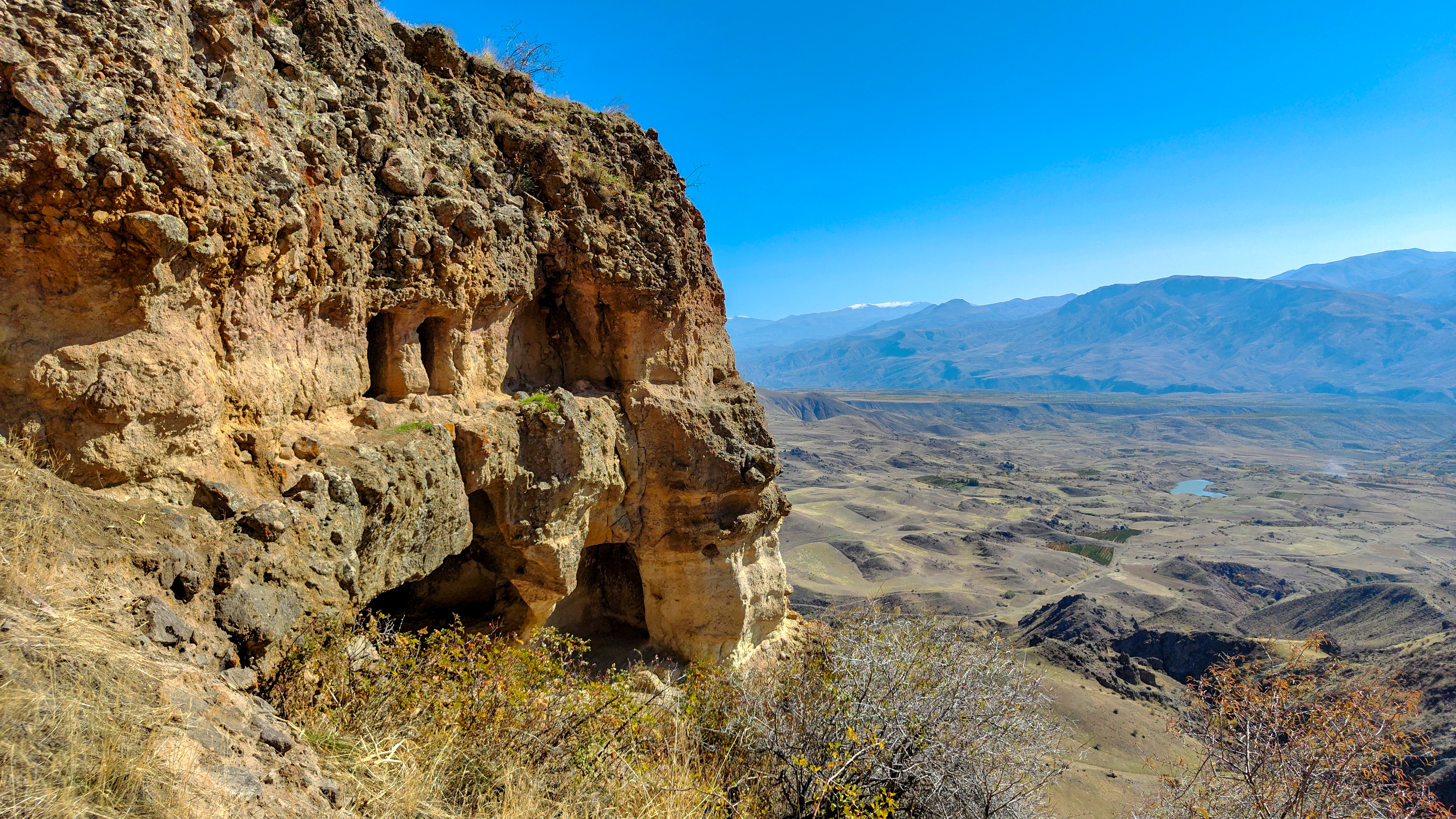

Location
- Interactive map of Rock-cut Church of Rind

The Rock-cut Church of Rind (Armenian: Ռինդի վիմափոր եկեղեցի, romanized: Rindi vimapor eghekhetsi) is a medieval religious structure located in the Vayots Dzor Province of Armenia, approximately 4 km north of Rind village. It is situated on the western side of a rocky outcrop on the southern slope of the Gomadrunk peak in the Karkatar mountain range. While the exact date of its construction is unknown, it is presumed to date back to the Early Middle Ages.

In 2024, two hiking trails were constructed, making the site more accessible to tourists.

== Description ==
There are two rock-cut churches in the vicinity of Rind. One is located in the Ulgyur site and is known as the "Hermit's Chapel" (Chgnavori matur). The church described here, however, has remained largely unknown to the scientific community until recently.

The church is carved directly into the cliffside and is situated at a high, difficult-to-reach elevation. It is probable that the ceiling was originally adorned with frescoes. The structure features a circular ground plan with a diameter of approximately 8 meters and a height of 10 meters. The entrance is located on the western side, above which were one small and two large windows. While the lower sections of the altar and adjacent walls have eroded over time, the upper portions of storage niches carved into the rock remain visible below the cornice line.

== Adjacent structures ==
Several additional chambers are carved into the southern part of the rock mass. The paths leading to these areas have weathered away, making them inaccessible without technical climbing equipment. Carved crosses are visible on the walls of these chambers.

A few dozen meters east of the church, there are several khachkars (cross-stones) and their original pedestals.

== Gallery ==
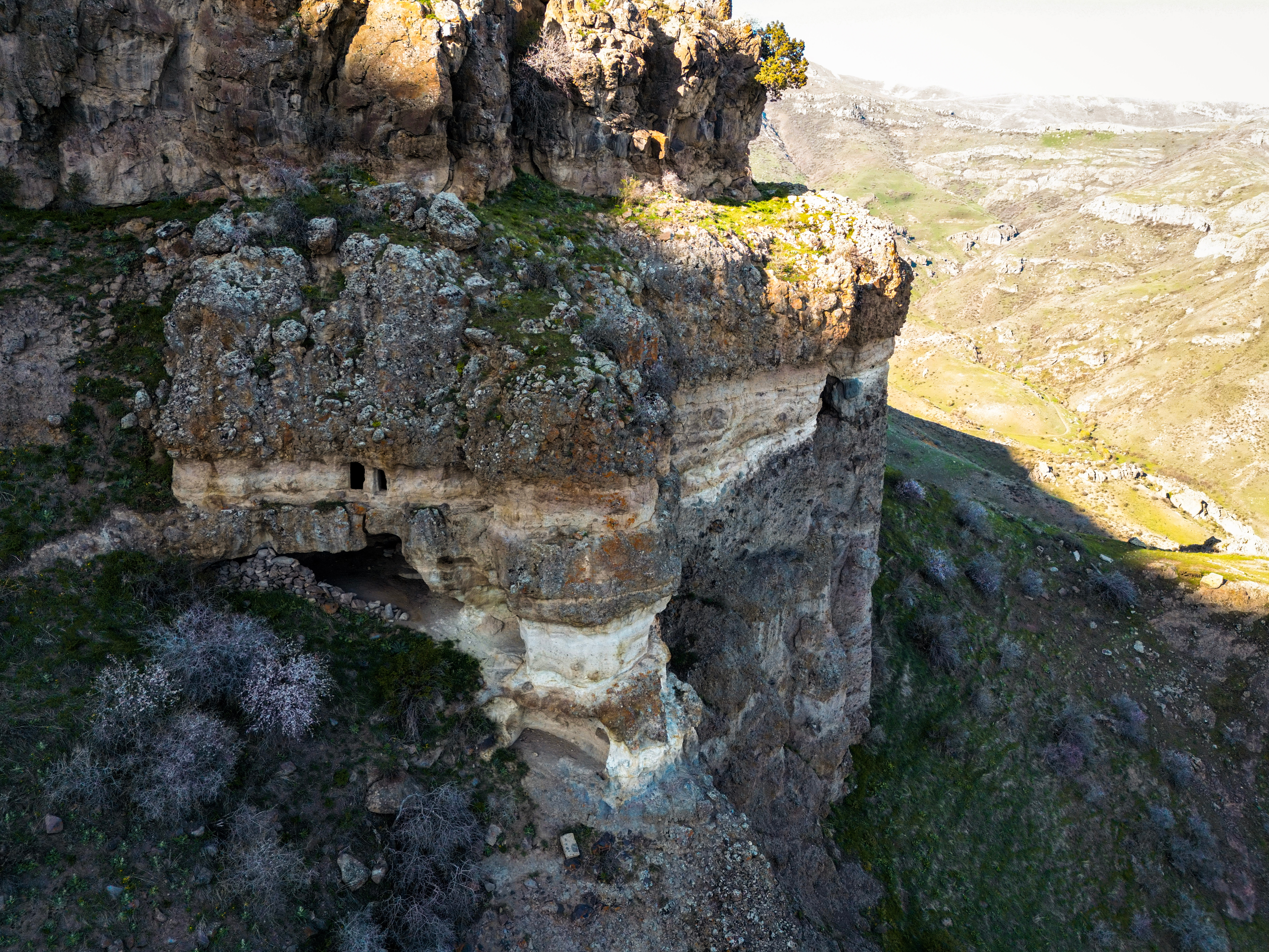
General view of the rock mass

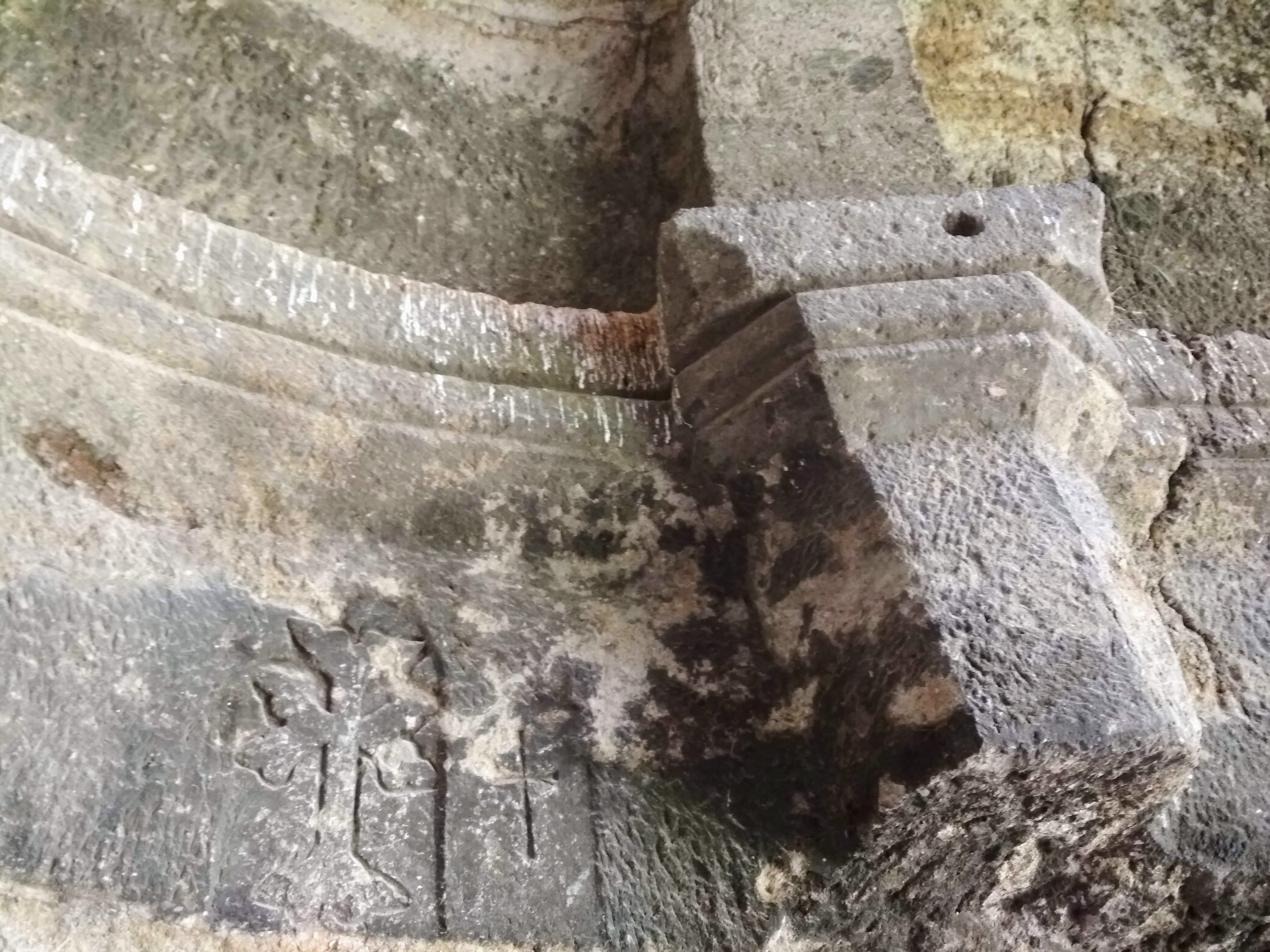
A column extending to the ceiling

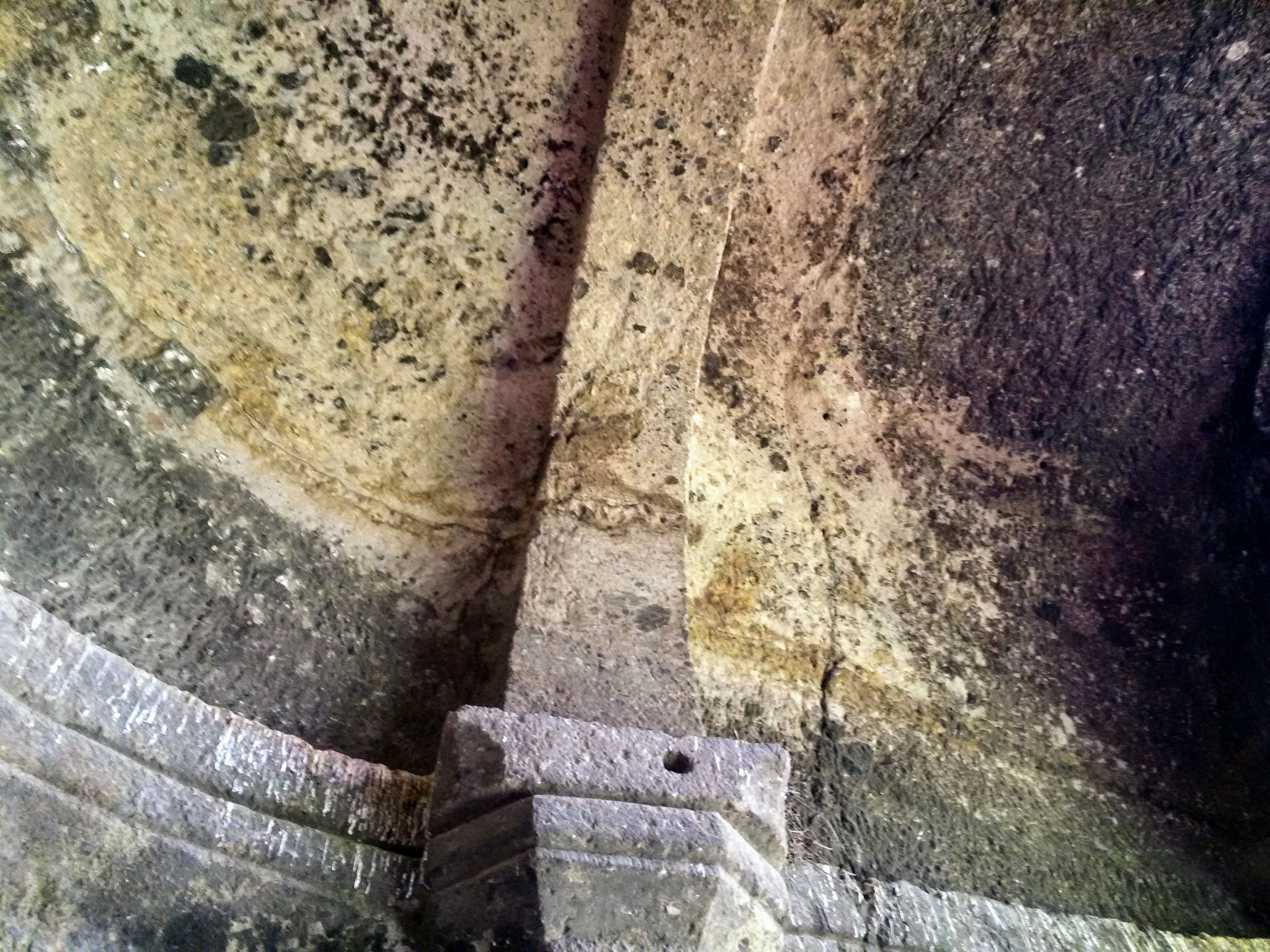
A column extending to the ceiling

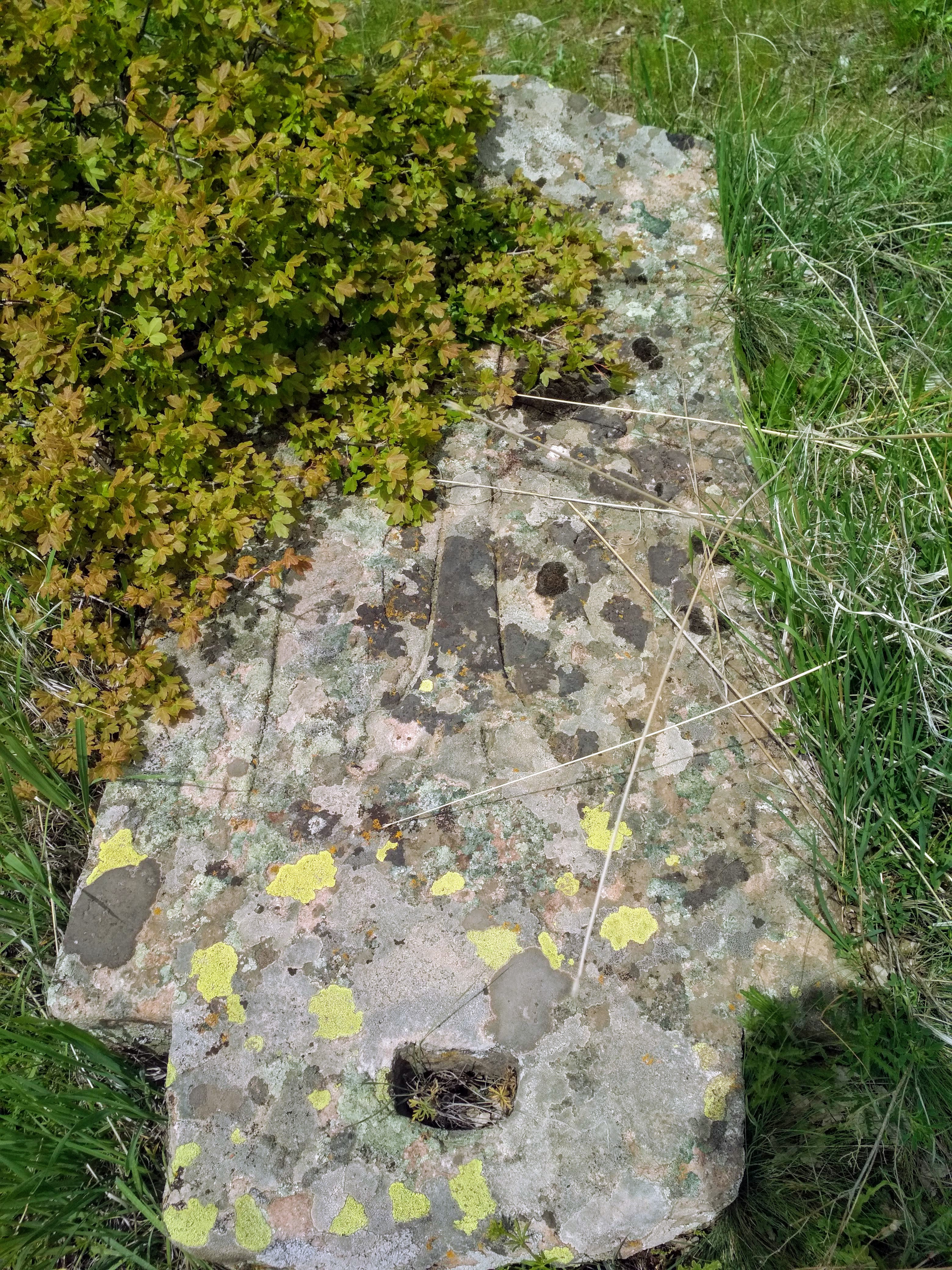
Khachkar located 100 meters east of the church

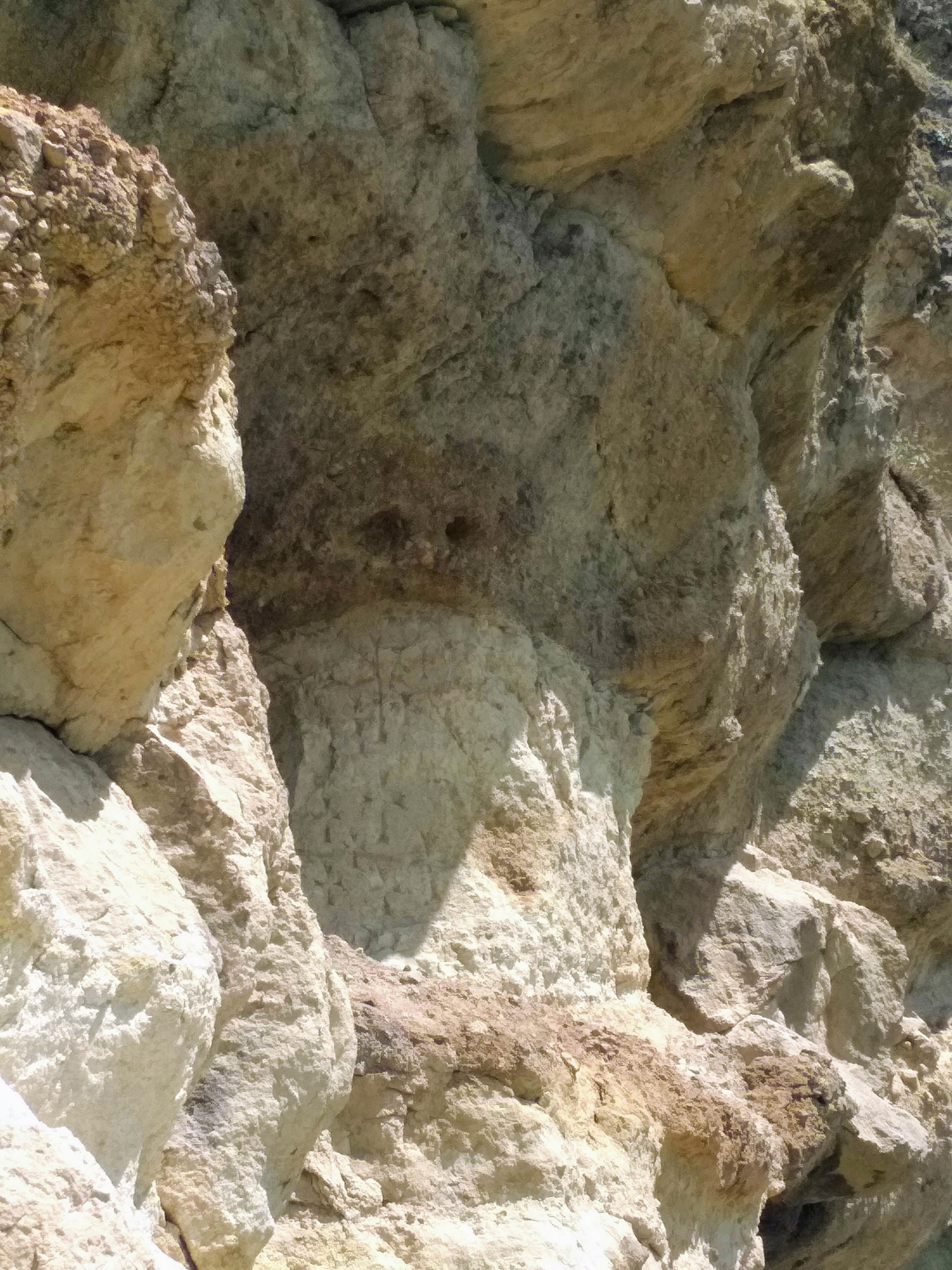
The wall of the southern chamber

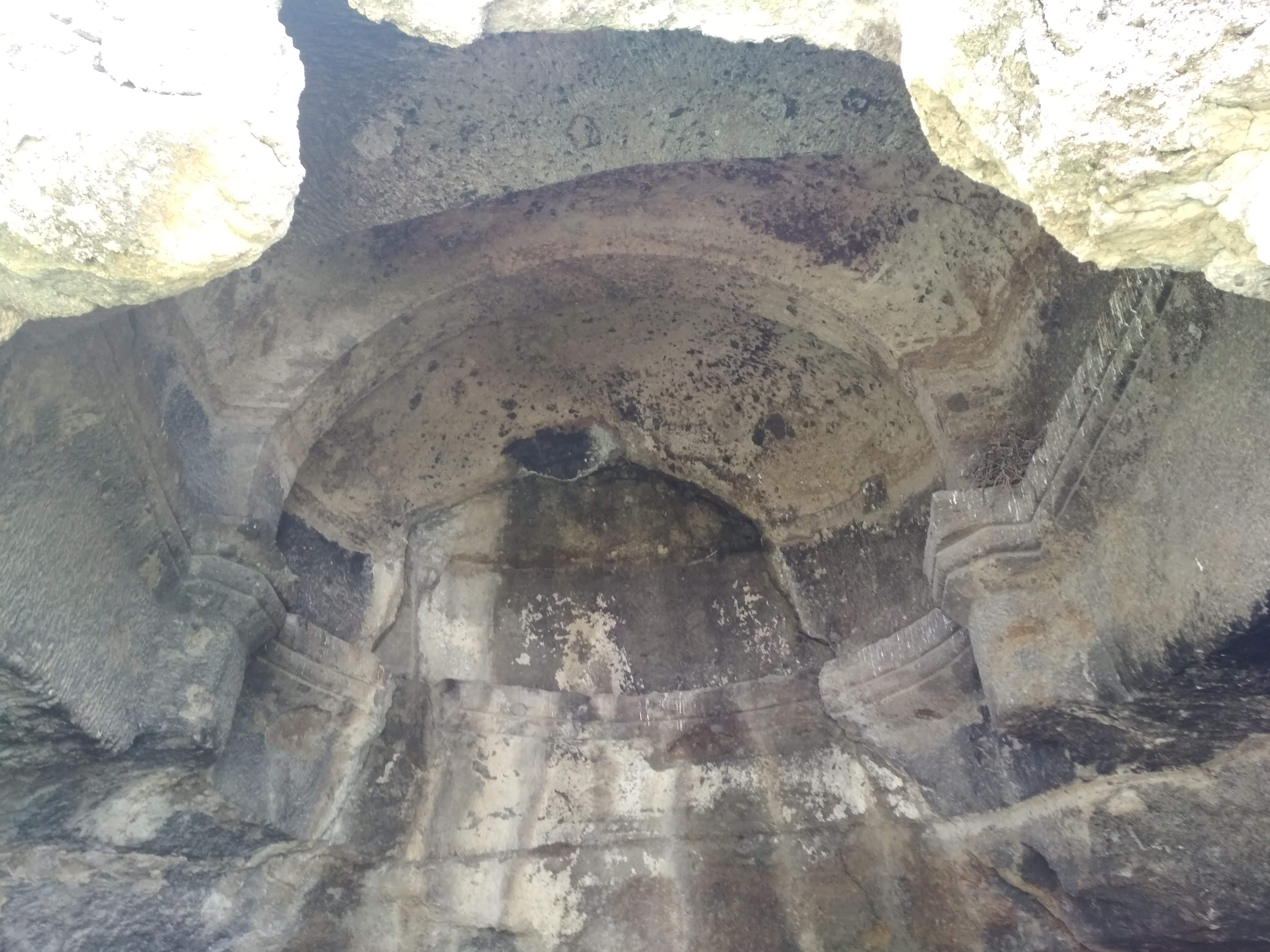
The ceiling of the church

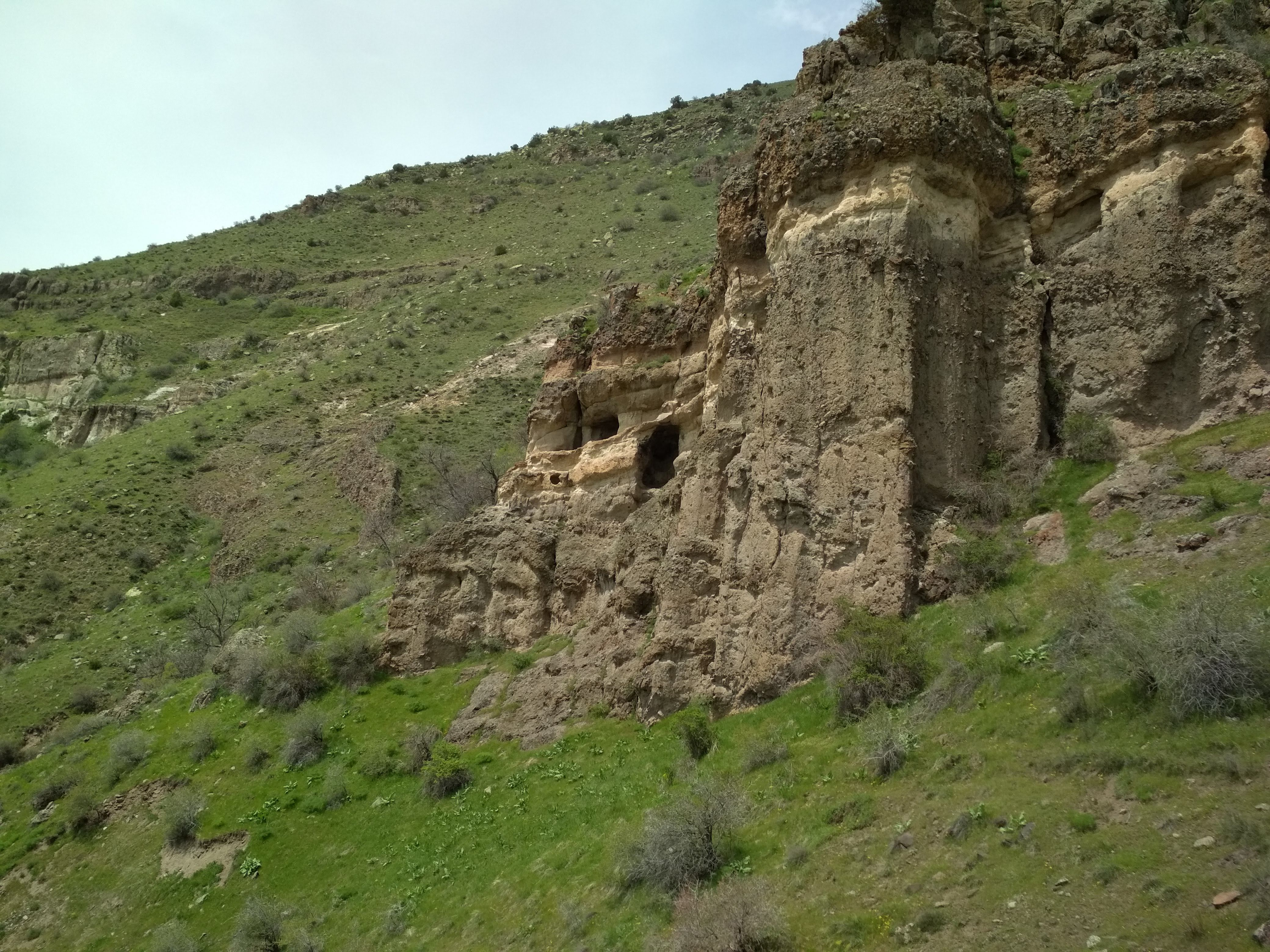
The rock mass of the church from the south
