= Attack on the Online International News Network =

Terrorist incident in Pakistan

- Part of the Balochistan conflict
- Location: Quetta, Balochistan, Pakistan
- Date: 28 August 2014
- Target: Online International News Network
- Attack type: Armed attack
- Weapon: 9 mm pistol
- Deaths: 3
- Victims: 2 journalists, 1 media worker
- Perpetrators: 2
- Motive: Attack on journalists

The attack on the Online International News Network was an attack on the office of the news agency, located in Quetta, Balochistan, Pakistan, on 28 August 2014, that resulted in the killing of journalists Irshad Mastoi and Ghulam Rasool, as well as accountant Mohammed Younus.

== Attack ==
Places in Balochistan, Pakistan, where journalists have been killed. The red shaded area is Balochistan, one of the four provinces of Pakistan. Mentioned locations within Pakistan relative to the capital Islamabad and the largest city Karachi.

On August 28 two gunmen broke into Mastoi's office, located on the second story of the Kabirwala Building, on Jinnah Road in downtown Quetta. Senior journalist Mastio and two others were gunned down by a 9 mm. The other victims were trainee reporter Ghulam Rasool, also known as Abdul Rasul, and accountant Mohammed Younus. Mastio was the first killed, and it was later reported that he had been receiving threats. Only Rasul, a student at the University of Balochistan in Quetta, made it to the hospital, where he died from his wounds.

== Arrest ==
Arrests were made a full year after the murder. The two arrested men were brought to a press conference presented by Sarfaraz Bugti, who is the provincial home minister in Balochistan. Bugti announced their affiliation with the Balochistan Liberation Army, who are secessionists, played a tape of their confession, and also accused the suspects of killing Habib Jalib Baloch, leader of the Balochistan National Party, in 2010. In all the suspects were accused by Bugti of killing 27 people. The suspects were identified by Bugti as Shafqat Ali Rohdini, also known as Naveed, from Khuzdar and Mohammad Ibrahieem, a.k.a. Shah Jee, from Quetta.

Shafqat Ali Rohdini, confessed that he was working for Balochistan Liberation Army (BLA) since 2000. He claimed that he was ordered to kill Irshad Mastoi by Aslam Baloch alias Achu. Aslam Baloch was one of the leader of BLA.

== Irshad Mastoi ==
Irshad Mastoi, also known as Arshad Mustoi, was originally from the city of Jacobabad. He was a father to three children that were all under the age of four at the time of his death. He was 34 at the time he was murdered and is buried in the cemetery known as Numaish Ground in Jacobabad.

Mastoi was the bureau chief at Online International News Network and news assignment editor at ARY News.

Mastoi's career had been rocky for a while. In December 2009 while covering the signing ceremony of the 7th NFC award in Gwadar he got shocked by a wire to close to his hotel window. His hand hit it while trying to discard a cigarette and resulted in his right hand having to be amputated. After months of depression he overcame odds and started typing with his left hand. He had hopes of getting aid from an international or national organization to get a bionic arm but had no such luck.

Mastio held the position of general secretary of Balochistan Union of Journalists.

== Reactions ==
After the death of Irshad Mastio, the Pakistan Federal Union of Journalists asked that all its members to protest in an attempt to condemn his killing.

Mastio was one of the fourteen journalist honored by the Newseum on June 9, 2015. The chief executive officer of the Newseum, Peter Prichard, said that "It is right, and just, that we pause today in our busy lives to remember what these journalists did, and why they did it." Kathy Gannon spoke of the dangers that journalists face, "As journalists, we join this profession because we are curious. We who go off to conflict areas are satisfying that curiosity to understand the why and how of war, and most especially, the who of those caught in the middle, the people."

== See also ==
- List of journalists killed during the Balochistan conflict (1947–present)
