= Rynd =

Rynd may refer to:

People with the surname

- James Alexander Porterfield Rynd (1846–1917) Irish chess player and lawyer
- Francis Rynd (1801–1861), Irish physician, developer of hollow needle used in syringes

Other

- Rynd, iron support used with millstones; see Millrind

== See also ==
- Rind (disambiguation)
