= The State of Bonded Labor in Pakistan =

Non-fiction book

The State of Bonded Labor in Pakistan, by Shujaat Ali Rahi, is a treatise that reflects the status of bonded labor in Pakistan, a country with an estimated population of 1.7 million in bonded labor. The book was published by National Coalition Against Bonded Labor (NCABL), with the support of Trócaire.

The book deals with the issue of the bonded labor, its definition, its prevalence and severity in SAARC, and Pakistan's commitment to the abolition of the bondage system in various fields such as agriculture, brick kilns, and other industries. The book analyses the issue and suggests certain practical measures to handle the issue. In a preface to the book, I. A. Rehman, the Chairman of National Coalition against Bonded Labor, states the book is a "significant development" because it provides "proper documentation by NGOs in respect of hurdles faced by them for eradicating the menace of bonded labor."

== See also ==
- Feudalism in Pakistan
