= Jam Abdul Karim Bijar =

Pakistani politician

- ڄام عبدالڪريم بجار

Member of the National Assembly of Pakistan
- Incumbent
- Assumed office 29 February 2024
- Constituency: NA-229 Karachi Malir-I
- In office 13 August 2018 – 10 August 2023
- Constituency: NA-236 Karachi Malir-I

Personal details
- Born: Karachi, Sindh, Pakistan
- Party: PPP (2018-present)
- Relatives: Sardar Jam Bijar Khan Jokhio (Father); Sardar Ataullah Mengal (grandfather/nana); Akhtar Mengal (uncle); Jam Awais Bijar Khan Jokhio (brother)

Jam Abdul Karim Bijar (Sindhi: ڄام عبدالڪريم بجار) is a Pakistani politician who has been a member of the National Assembly of Pakistan since February 2024, and previously served in this position from August 2018 till August 2023.

== Political career ==
He was elected to the National Assembly of Pakistan from Constituency NA-236 (Malir-I) as a candidate of Pakistan Peoples Party in the 2018 Pakistani general election.

== Nazim Jokhio Case ==
He and his brother Jam Awais Bijar Khan Jokhio tortured and murdered a local journalist Nazim Jokhio on 3 November 2021. Reportedly, the 27-year-old victim tried to stop the guests of Jokhio from hunting the protected Houbara bustard bird in Thatta. FIR was registered against Bijar and he was taken into police custody. As of 2023, the same unconvicted criminal has been named for general election from Pakistan Peoples Party from Malir.
