= Abdost Rind =

Pakistani journalist

- Born: 1984?
- Died: 18 February 2011; Turbat, Balochistan, Pakistan
- Occupation: Journalist
- Years active: 2004–2011

Abdost Rind (1984? – 18 February 2011) a reporter in Pakistan, was working for the Daily Eagle, an Urdu-language newspaper in Turbat, Balochistan, Pakistan, on 18 February, when he became the second journalist killed in Balochistan in 2011.

== Personal ==
Abdost is survived by his mother, father and older brother.

== Career ==
Abdost had been a reporter since he was twenty years old, which was about seven years.

== Death ==
The red shaded area is Balochistan, Pakistan, one of the four provinces of Pakistan. Mentioned locations within Pakistan relative to the capital Islamabad and the largest city Karachi.

On 18 February 2011, Abdost Rind, a part-time reporter for the Urdu-language newspaper Daily Eagle, was shot four times on his way home from work in Turbat, Balochistan, Pakistan. The attackers were unidentified and got away on a motorcycle after targeting Rind, who reportedly died immediately. Rind's family, his father, mother, and brother, believe that his murder was work-related and have called for an immediate investigation. The Committee to Protect Journalists has also called for a quick investigation into Rind's murder.

== Impact ==
According to the committee to Protect Journalists, Pakistan was the deadliest country for journalists in 2010 and 2011.

The International Federation of Journalists said Rind was the second journalist killed in Balochistan in 2011. Ilyas Nizzar, according to the UNESCO, was the first journalist killed in Balochistan in 2011. Nizzar's body was found in Pidarak on 5 January 2011.

Reporters Without Borders does not list Ilyas Nizzar and Abdost Rind as being the first two Pakistani journalists killed in 2011. Prominent politician and media owner Salman Taseer and journalist Wali Khan Babar were the first two Pakistanis that Reporters Without Borders listed as being killed in 2011. Abdost Rind was one of the most active reporters in the Turbat region of Balochistan, Pakistan, according to the International News Safety Institute.

== Reactions ==
Irina Bokova, director-general of UNESCO, said, "The killing of Abdos Rind raises further concern over the ability of media workers in Pakistan to exercise the fundamental human right of freedom of expression. All of us depend on free media to engage in informed debate and make responsible choices."

The Pakistan Federal Union of Journalists said, "Authorities in Balochistan must act quickly to investigate Abdost Rind's death, to send a message to those responsible that journalists killers will not go unpunished. The disturbing frequency with which media personnel were attacked and killed in Balochistan for the past many years must end."

Bob Dietz, CPJ's Asia program coordinator, said, "CPJ joins with our Pakistani colleagues in calling for a swift investigation into the shooting death of Abdost Rind. Pakistan's reputation as a country where journalists are killed with impunity is among the worst in the world. To allow Rind's death to go uninvestigated and unprosecuted will only add to that miserable record."

Jacqueline Park, IFJ Asia-Pacific Director, said, "For too long, conflict and the risks for media personnel in Balochistan have gone relatively unnoticed, with most attention focused on the war consuming Pakistan's northern Khyber-Pakhtunkhwa province and Tribal Areas. The crisis of media safety compels the global community to immediately step forward with a gesture of solidarity and support for the beleaguered journalists of Balochistan."

The investigation behind Rind's murder has not concluded and no official motive has yet been made public.

== See also ==
- List of journalists killed during the Balochistan conflict (1947–present)
