= NA-229 Karachi Malir-I =

Constituency of the National Assembly of Pakistan

- Constituency for the National Assembly of Pakistan
- Region: Gadap Town (partly), Ibrahim Hyderi Town (partly), Shah Mureed, Bin Qasim and Murad Memon Town of Malir District in Karachi
- Electorate: 232,437

Current constituency
- Party: Pakistan People's Party
- Member: Jam Abdul Karim Bijar
- Created from: NA-258 Karachi-XX

NA-229 Karachi Malir-I (این اے-229، کراچی ملیر-1) is a constituency for the National Assembly of Pakistan.

== Assembly Segments ==
Constituency number	Constituency	District	Current MPA	Party
84	PS-84 Karachi Malir-I	Malir District	Muhammad Yousuf Murtaza Baloch	PPP
85	PS-85 Karachi Malir-II	Malir District	Muhammad Sajid Jokhio	PPP

== Members of Parliament ==
=== 2018–2023: NA-236 Karachi Malir-I ===
Election	Member	Party
2018	Jam Abdul Karim Bijar	PPPP

=== 2024–present: NA-229 Karachi Malir-I ===
Election	Member	Party
2024	Jam Abdul Karim Bijar	PPPP

== Election 2002 ==
General elections were held on 10 October 2002. Sher Muhammad Baloch of Pakistan Peoples Party won by 38,225 votes.

General election 2002: NA-258 Karachi -XX
Party	Candidate	Votes	%	±%
PPP	Sher Muhammad Baloch	38,225	35.84	
Independent	Abdul Hakeem Baloch	27,903	26.16	
MMA	Abdul Shakoor Khairpuri	17,630	16.53	
MQM	Syed Ameer Hussain Shah Lakhyari	8,400	7.88	
PML(Q)	Aleem Adil Shaikh	4,552	4.27	
PMA	Zain ul Abdeen	3,906	3.66	
Others	Others (thirteen candidates)	6,040	5.66	
Turnout		108,889	41.34	
Total valid votes		106,656	97.95	
Rejected ballots		2,233	2.05	
Majority		10,322	9.68	
Registered electors		263,393		

== Election 2008 ==
General elections were held on 18 February 2008. Sher Muhammad Baloch of PPP won by 134,696 votes.

General election 2008: NA-258 Karachi -XX
Party	Candidate	Votes	%	±%
PPP	Sher Muhammad Baloch	134,696	79.59	
MQM	Nisar Ahmed Shar	15,017	8.87	
Independent	Abubakar Memon	11,505	6.80	
Others	Others (fourteen candidates)	8,017	4.74	
Turnout		171,807	41.04	
Total valid votes		169,235	98.50	
Rejected ballots		2,572	1.50	
Majority		119,679	70.72	
Registered electors		418,663		
PPP hold				

== Election 2013 ==
General elections were held on 11 May 2013. Abdul Hakeem Baloch of PML-N won by 52,751 votes and became the member of National Assembly.

General election 2013: NA-258 Karachi -XX
Party	Candidate	Votes	%	±%
PML(N)	Abdul Hakeem Baloch	52,751	29.67	
PPP	Abdul Razak Raja	36,329	20.43	
Independent	Jam Abdul Karim Bijar	31,099	17.49	
MQM	Ahmed Gabol	17,854	10.04	
PTI	Qurban Ali	17,697	9.95	
Independent	Muhammad Usman Yaar Khan	6,425	3.61	
Others	Others (twenty three candidates)	15,651	8.81	
Turnout		182,101	46.24	
Total valid votes		177,806	97.64	
Rejected ballots		4,295	2.36	
Majority		16,422	9.24	
Registered electors		393,793		
PML(N) gain from PPP				

== Bye Election 2016 ==
On Nov 28, 2016 bye elections were held. Abdul Hakeem Baloch (who resigned from PML-N and joined Pakistan Peoples Party - PPP after developing differences with the PML-N leadership) won by 72400 votes on PPP ticket.

Bye Election 2016: NA-258 Karachi -XX
Party	Candidate	Votes	%	±%
PPP	Abdul Hakeem Baloch	72,400	93.22	
JUI-S	Shah Wali Ullah	1,999	2.57	
Others	Others (twelve candidates)	3,267	4.21	
Turnout		78,338	19.17	
Total valid votes		77,666	99.14	
Rejected ballots		672	0.86	
Majority		70,401	90.65	
Registered electors		408,613		
PPP gain from PML(N)				

== Election 2018 ==
General elections were held on 25 July 2018.

General election 2018: NA-236 Karachi Malir-I
Party	Candidate	Votes	%	±%
PPP	Jam Abdul Karim Bijar	66,623	56.73	
PTI	Masroor Ali	26,456	22.53	
PML(N)	Qadir Bakhsh	9,839	8.38	
TLP	Afshan Shahid	4,516	3.85	
MMA	Somar Burfat	4,061	3.46	
Others	Others (nine candidates)	3,964	3.38	
Turnout		117,437	50.40	
Rejected ballots		1,978	1.67	
Majority		40,167	34.20	
Registered electors		233,028		
PPP hold		Swing	N/A	

== Election 2024 ==
General elections were held on 8 February 2024. Jam Abdul Karim Bijar won the election with 55,730 votes.

General election 2024: NA-229 Karachi Malir-I
Party	Candidate	Votes	%	±%
PPP	Jam Abdul Karim Bijar	55,730	53.74	▼2.99
PML(N)	Qadir Bux	21,841	21.06	▲12.68
PTI	Wali Muhammad (Note: Filed nomination papers as PTI candidate but ECP allowed him to run as an Independent)	14,131	13.63	▼8.90
TLP	Muhammad Ijaz	5,277	5.04	▲1.19
JI	Mumtaz Hussain	5,219	5.03	N/A
Others	Others (ten candidates)	1,512	1.46	
Turnout		106,015	45.62	▼4.78
Total valid votes		103,710	97.83	
Rejected ballots		2,305	2.17	
Majority		33,889	32.68	▼1.52
Registered electors		232,439		
PPP hold				

== See also ==
- NA-228 Dadu-II
- NA-230 Karachi Malir-II
