= Abdul Razzaq Baloch (journalist) =

Baloch journalist

Haji Abdul Razzaq Baloch
- Born: ca. 1971–1978
- Disappeared: March 24, 2013
- Died: August 21, 2013; Karachi, Pakistan
- Cause of death: Strangulation
- Occupations: Journalist and copy editor/sub editor
- Employer: Daily Tawar (Voice)

Haji Abdul Razzaq Baloch, also known as Haji Razak, (c. 1971–1978 – 21 August 2013) was a copy editor/sub editor at nationalist newspaper Daily Tawar (Voice). Abdul Razzaq's mutilated dead body was found in Karachi, Pakistan nearly five months after he had been reported missing on 24 March 2013.

== Personal ==
He was reported to be around 35–42 years old at the time of his death.

== Career ==
Abdul Razzaq was a journalist and an activist. He was a copy editor/sub editor at nationalist newspaper Daily Tawar (Voice). An Urdu newspaper printed from Mustang, Balochistan.

== Death ==
The red shaded area is Balochistan, Pakistan, one of the four provinces of Pakistan. Mentioned locations within Pakistan relative to the capital Islamabad and the largest city Karachi.

Abdul Razzaq Baloch was reported missing by his sister on March 24, 2013, in Karachi. Razzaq was last seen leaving a friend's house in the Liyari neighborhood of Karachi, which is a district severely affected by the ethnic and gang warfare. His body was found mutilated, tortured along with signs of strangulation on August 21, 2013, in Surjani Town area of Karachi.

According to reports, the bodies of Abdul Razzaq Baloch and Pattan Bugti a resident of Hub, were found tortured to death and thrown away in Sarjani town of Karachi. Razzaq's body was found with a piece of paper suggesting he was the missing journalist from the Daily Tawar.

His sister, Saeeda Sarbazi, told Reuters that she was in no doubt as to the identities of the culprits, stating they were Pakistan's intelligence services.

The family decided on a second look at the body to truly identify him. Once Razzaq 's body was found it took his family 24 hours to be able to identify him due to the severe trauma to his body. The childhood stains on Abdul's nails were how the family was finally able to truly identify him and bury him in the Mewa Shah graveyard. The childhood stains on Abdul's nails were how the family was finally able to truly identify him.

== Context ==
There had been at least 16 bodies of Baluch individuals 6 of them journalists and 4 of them were Balochistan, which were found in the Surjani Town area of Karachi within the six months prior to Razzaq's death.

== Impact ==
Certain districts of Balochistan are no longer considered safe for journalists, and are becoming dangerous places to report from. When it would come to security or armed struggles, journalists would not report any mishaps due to it endangering their lives or to avoid being threatened.

== Reactions ==
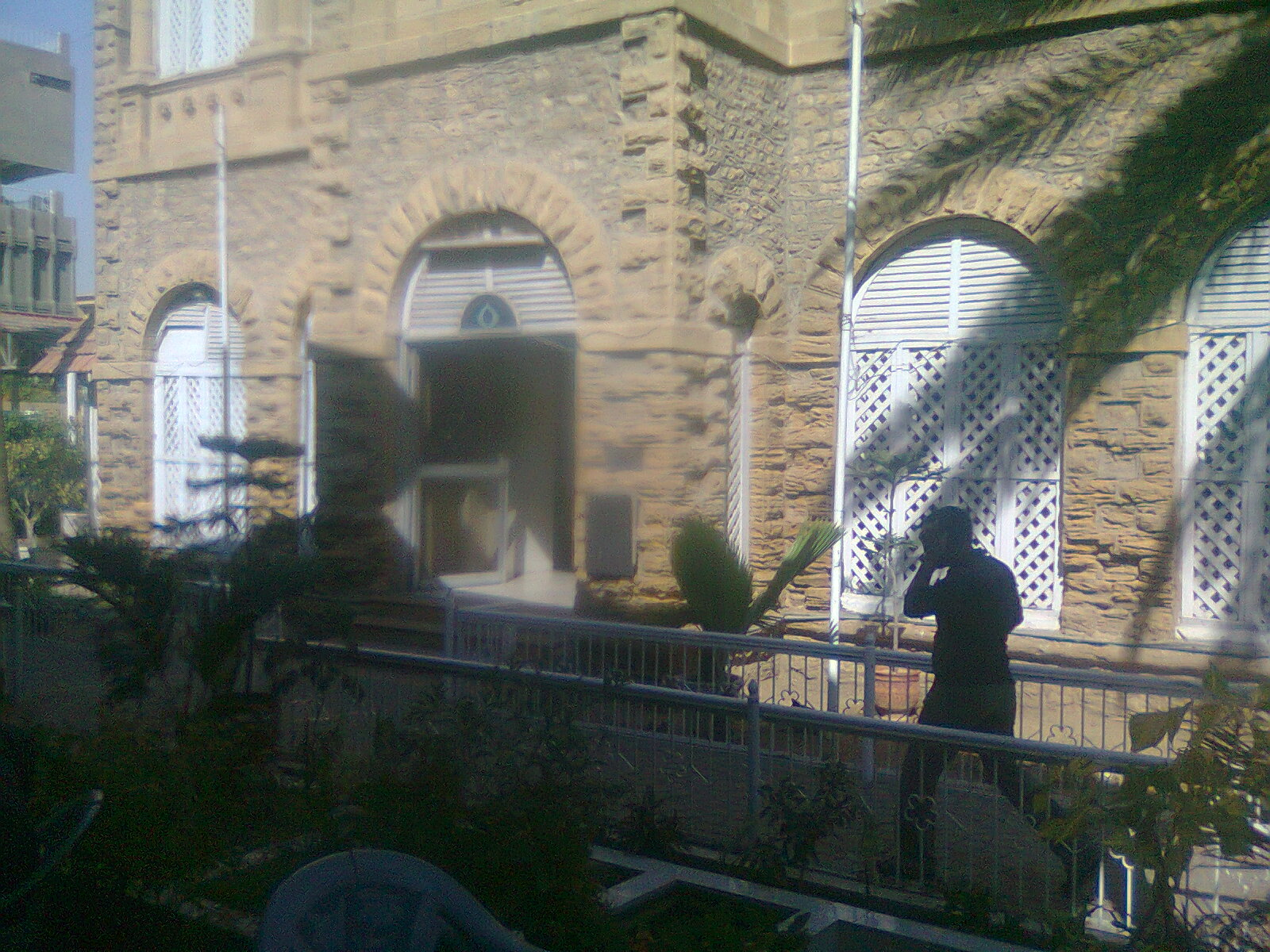
Protests were held at the Karachi Press Club.

Abdul Razzaq left the Daily Tawar, which is known for its coverage of conflicts happening between rival groups along with the government, after a fellow journalist was found dead after going missing.

With Razzaq being the 7th reporter to go missing and later found dead due to several reasons this brings up questions to who and what is causing these happenings.

After the disappearance of Razzaq, his family had protested holding banners and posters outside of a Karachi Press Club trying to spread the word of their missing family member.

== See also ==
- List of journalists killed during the Balochistan conflict (1947–present)
