= Adnkronos =

Italian news agency

- Industry: Journalism
- Predecessor: Kronos (founded in 1951) and Agenzia Di Notizie (founded in 1959)
- Founded: 1963; 63 years ago (by merger of Kronos and Agenzia Di Notizie)
- Products: News agency
- Parent: Giuseppe Marra Communications
- Website: www.adnkronos.com

Adnkronos is an Italian news agency.

== History and profile ==
Adnkronos was established in 1963 by a merger of two agencies, Kronos (founded in 1951) and Agenzia Di Notizie (founded in 1959). The agency is based in Rome.

Adnkronos is owned by Giuseppe Marra Communications. Its editor-in-chief is Giuseppe Marra.

The agency was expanded to include Adnkronos Salute which is a health agency. In 2003, the agency established its International office, Adnkronos International, which provides news and reports in Arabic and English, mainly from the Arab world.

In July 2014, Adnkronos International signed an agreement with Iran's official news agency, IRNA, to promote bilateral news cooperation.

The agency also publishes Il libro dei fatti, the Italian edition of the World Almanac.

== See also ==
- List of news agencies
