= Abdul Haq Baloch (journalist) =

Pakistani journalist (1978–2013)

- Born: August 12, 1978; Pakistan
- Disappeared: Khuzdar, Khuzdar District, Balochistan Province, Pakistan
- Died: September 29, 2012 (aged 34); Khuzdar, Khuzdar District, Balochistan Province, Pakistan
- Cause of death: Gunshot
- Body discovered: Outside of the Khuzdar Press Club
- Other name: Abdul Baloch
- Occupation: Broadcast reporter
- Employer: ARY Television
- Partner: Unidentified wife
- Children: Unidentified children

Abdul Haq Baloch, also known as Abdul Baloch (August 12, 1978 – September 29, 2012), was a Pakistani TV journalist for the ARY Television channel, in Khuzdar, Khuzdar District, Balochistan, Pakistan. He was also general secretary of Khuzdar Press Club. The broadcast reporter was murdered in 2012. His murderers remain unidentified.

== Personal ==
Abdul Baloch was born on August 12, 1978. He had a wife and family whose names are unidentified. Baloch was murdered at the age 34. Baloch was from Khuzdar, Pakistan.

== Career ==
Abdul Haq Baloch had been a correspondent of ARY Television for ten years. His employer was located in Khuzdar, which is a part of Balochistan Province, Pakistan. Baloch reported issues pertaining to politics, government, and war. Baloch's reporting could have been a factor in his murder. Tensions were high after the Balochistan High Court barred news coverage of banned groups in October 2011. Many banned groups had become angry because local journalists were not reporting on their military affiliations. He was also general secretary at the Khuzdar Press Club.

== Death ==
The red shaded area is Balochistan, Pakistan, one of the four provinces of Pakistan. Mentioned locations within Pakistan relative to the capital Islamabad and the largest city Karachi.

On September 29, 2012, Abdul Baloch was murdered on his drive home from a Khuzdar Press Club meeting in the city of Khuzdar in Pakistan. Four masked men on motorcycles opened fire on his car, approximately 100 yards from the press club. Baloch died from his injuries while seeking treatment from the nearest hospital. He was pronounced dead at 7:30 p.m. (local time) on Chaker Khan Road.

The police registered a case against "unidentified gunmen". Minister Rehman Malik announced that the judicial commission would thoroughly investigate the killing of Abdul Baloch. The minister established a reward of 2.5 million if anyone helped identify Baloch's killers. As of 2018, his killers have remained unidentified.

== Context ==
The police believed that the murder was connected with the Baluch Musalah Diffa Army. The previous November, Baloch had been named on a hit list issued by a BMDA spokesman. Members of this association were angry because local journalists were refusing to report on their military operations. Baloch was one of the journalists who had refused to report on this topic. Baloch had been receiving threats from the BMDA, according to Hamid Mir, a prominent Pakistani journalist.

== Context ==
Pakistan is one of the most dangerous countries for journalists in South Asia. Ranked the fifth deadliest country by the Committee to Protect Journalists. A number of 89 journalists were killed in Pakistan and of those, 60 were confirmed to have been killed because of their work during 2012. Due to the rising death rate of journalists in 2012, 23 press clubs shut down in the province for more than two weeks due to threats and warnings from various affiliations. President of the Balochistan Union of Journalists, Khalil Ahmed said, 43 journalists have been killed in Balochistan, including by bomb blasts and targeted killings. An additional 25 journalists lost their lives in targeted killings while reporting in conflict zones in Balochistan. The government of Balochistan is being blamed for failing to provide security to the journalists. According to Anwar Ul Haq Kakar, spokesperson for the Balochistan government, “the government has made a security plan for the journalists, media networks, and newspaper agencies in the province. We will give protection to the news agencies who are involved in the distribution of newspapers. The government will help them in every possible way, for example, we will give the following security through Frontier Corps and Police.” Since the 2012 murders, safety regulations and guidelines have not been implemented for journalists. In fact, during the year of 2016, 728 journalists were killed within Pakistan and violence against journalists continues.

== Impact ==
Another employee of ARY News was killed in Peshawar, Pakistan during violent protests against an anti-Islam film on September 21, 2012. The employee died after being hit by a bullet in police firing. These two killings raised more question on whether or not journalists were safe in Pakistan.

Violence against reporters throughout the Balochistan Providence isn't uncommon and this conflict has been in ongoing since 1947. Haq is one of 23 journalists who have been killed during the last 15 years while performing their line of work in Balochistan. The now deceased journalists were reporting on politics, war, and human rights. In Baloch's case, he had been murdered because of his lack of reporting. All of these deaths have no killer assigned to these crimes. Pakistan is accounted for being the deadliest countries in the world for the press.

“Balochistan is a dangerous place for journalists to work in. Haq is the 22nd journalist to have lost his life in the line of duty in the restive province. But none of the cases has been seriously investigated and no one has been arrested or punished for these heinous crimes,” Alam and Ketkar said.

Balochistan government has constituted two different judicial tribunals to investigate six murder cases of journalists killed in the province since 2011. A statement from the Home Department in Quetta, capital of southern Balochistan province, said that the two tribunals would work in Khuzdar and Makran districts to investigate these murder cases of journalists. Tribunals, according to the statement, ensured the public that the investigation would hold people reliable for these murders and also recommend measures to prevent such murders of journalists in the future. The six cases under investigation were; Abdul Haq Baloch, Javed Ahmed and Munir Shakil from Khuzdar district and Abdul Razzaq, Abudost Rind and Ilyas Nazar from coastal Makran district. These six journalists were killed during 2011 and 2013.

== Reactions ==
Irina Bokova, the director-general of UNESCO, said, “I condemn the murder of Abdul Kahliq.... I am deeply concerned about attacks on journalists and media workers in Pakistan and call on the authorities to bring those responsible for these crimes to justice. It is essential that the basic human right of freedom of expression be respected, and journalists allowed to carry out work without having to fear for their life.

Prime Minister Raja Pervez Ashraf expressed grief at the death of Baloch and strongly condemned the incident. He directed authorities to apprehend those involved in the heinous crime and bring them to justice.

“Journalists have been continuously targeted over the last few years. Authorities must act swiftly to end this cycle of violence and impunity,” Safma Secretary General Imtiaz Alam and SAMC President Kumar Ketkar said in a joint statement.

“Safma and SAMC support calls for an immediate inquiry into the death of Baloch, who was also the general secretary of Khuzdar Press Club, and all other journalists abducted, tortured and killed in Balochistan. It has become virtually impossible to report independently,” the heads of the media rights bodies said.

“Threats to the safety of journalists, especially those working in the conflict areas are mounting. The authorities should work towards ensuring that the journalists work in a safe environment and do not become victims of anti-media attacks,” they media rights also said.

The Balochistan Union of Journalists called upon the government to arrest the killers of journalist Abdul Haq Baloch, general secretary of the Khuzdar Press Club, who was assassinated. A protest rally outside of the Chief Minister's Secretariat was held on the following Monday of Baloch's death. BUJ leaders said the government had failed to protect lives of journalists in the province and across the country. Key members of the community who led the gathering were; Isa Tareen, Rezaur Rehman, Shezada Zulfiqar, Hamadullah Siyapa, Owais Tuhid and Matiullah Jan.

== See also ==
- List of journalists killed during the Balochistan conflict (1947–present)
