= Jam Awais Bijar Khan Jokhio =

Pakistani politician

- ڄام اوائيس ٻجر خان جوکيو

Member of the Provincial Assembly of Sindh
- In office 13 August 2018 – 11 August 2023
- Constituency: PS-79 Thatta-III

Personal details
- Born: 12 January 1982 (age 44)
- Party: Pakistan Peoples Party
- Relatives: Jam Abdul Karim Bijar (brother)

Jam Awais Bijar Khan Jokhio (Sindhi: ڄام اوائيس ٻجر خان جوکيو) is a Pakistani politician who had been a member of the Provincial Assembly of Sindh from August 2018 till August 2023.

== Early life and education ==
He was born on 12 January 1982 and did BA.

== Political career ==
He was elected to the Provincial Assembly of Sindh as a candidate of Pakistan Peoples Party from Constituency PS-79 (Thatta-III) in the 2018 Pakistani general election.

== Murder ==
He and his brother Jam Abdul Karim Bijar tortured and murdered a local journalist Nazim Jokhio on 3 November 2021. Reportedly, the 27-year-old victim tried to stop the guests of Jokhio from hunting houbara bustard in Thatta. FIR was registered against Jokhio and he was taken into police custody. He, along with 7 of his servants and guards, were indicted by a Karachi sessions court on 10 December 2022, Bijar plead not guilty to the charges and would contest them.
