= Munir Ahmed Shakir =

Baloch journalist

- Born: 1967?
- Died: 14 August 2011; Khuzdar, Pakistan
- Occupations: TV correspondent and online journalist
- Notable credit(s): Correspondent, Sabzbaat

Munir Ahmed Shakir (also spelled Muneer Shakir or Munir Shakar) (1967? – 14 August 2011) was an online journalist for the Online News Network and a TV correspondent for Sabzbaat, also known as Sabzbagh, a Baluch television station.

== Early life ==
He was an activist and was murdered in Khuzdar, Pakistan, where there was an ongoing insurgency. Four other journalists had died in Balochistan in the last year as the violence there has escalated and journalists have been targeted. The killing of Baloch journalists, like Shakir, is one of the drivers behind Pakistan's high murder rate for journalists in 2010 and 2011.

== Death ==
Baloch Separatist organisation had stopped journalist from covering their activities. Muneer Ahmed Shakir was shot dead after he had covered a protest organized by Baloch separatist group. According to police, Shakir was heading towards his home when armed men on motorbikes attacked him. He was injured in the attack and was shifted to a civil hospital where he succumbed to his wounds. Dawn News claim that Muneer Ahmed Shakir had received more than two bullet and he died on spot.

President of Balochistan union of journalist and Quetta press club condemn the attacked and demanded immediate arrest of the perpetrators.

== Impact ==
According to Reporters Without Borders, Munir Ahmed Shakir was the seventh journalist to be killed in Balochistan, but the organisation only reports journalist who have been independently confirmed to have been killed while reporting. He is the fourth journalist to die in Bolochistan since 2010. The Rural Media Network has reported that he was the 13th journalist killed throughout all of Pakistan through the first 8 months of 2011. According to Irshad Mastoi, journalism in Baluchistan was becoming "an endangered profession" because nationalists have threatened reporters who cover government activities.

== Reactions ==
Irina Bokova, the director-general of UNESCO, said: "I condemn the killing of Munir Shakar. It is essential that the perpetrators of this crime be brought to justice as soon as possible. Journalists must be provided with reasonable conditions of security if they are to exercise the basic human right of freedom of expression and provide people with the independent information they require to exercise their democratic rights responsibly."

Impunity in Pakistan makes it too easy to kill journalists and get away with it. Zohra Yusuf, chairperson of the Human Rights Commission of Pakistan, said: "The sharp rise in killings and other forms of violence against journalists is linked directly to the fact that in almost all cases in the last few years, where journalists have been killed or attacked on account of their work, the culprits remain unidentified and unpunished."

Rupert Colville, a representative of the U.N. High Commissioner for Human Rights, said: "None of the cases [of journalists killed in 2010 and 2011] have been fully or satisfactorily investigated. In Baluchistan alone, there were disturbing reports that 25 people – this is a mix of journalists, writers, students and human rights defenders – have been extra-judicially killed within the first four months of 2011."
