= Laleka =

- Location in Pakistan
- Coordinates: 30°8′0″N 73°23′0″E
- Country: Pakistan
- Province: Punjab
- District: Bahawalnagar District
- Elevation: 509 ft (155 m)
- Time zone: UTC+5 (PST)
  - Summer (DST): +6

Laleka (Urdu: لالیکا) is a town and Union Council of Bahawalnagar District in the Punjab province of Pakistan.
