= Sadozai =

Sadozai, also Sudhozai, Sudhazai, may refer to:

- Sadozai (Pashtun tribe), a major tribe from Afghanistan and Pakistan
- Wazirzada Sadozai (Pashtun tribe), a branch of the Sadozai tribe, concentrated in Khyber Pakhtunkhwa
- Sadozai dynasty, was founded in 1747 by Ahmad Shah Durrani at Kandahar and established the Sadozai Kingdom
- Sadozai Sultanate of Herat, a state in Herat founded in 1716
- Sadozai Kingdom, a name for the Durrani Empire
- Sadozai Kingdom of Mankera, a semi-independent principality of the Durrani Empire founded in 1772 situated in western Punjab
- Sudhan (Azad Kashmiri Tribe) who also call themselves Sudhozai
- Dera Sadozai, a name for Sudhan Gali in Azad Kashmir, Pakistan
