= Rind, Armenia =

Rind Ռինդ
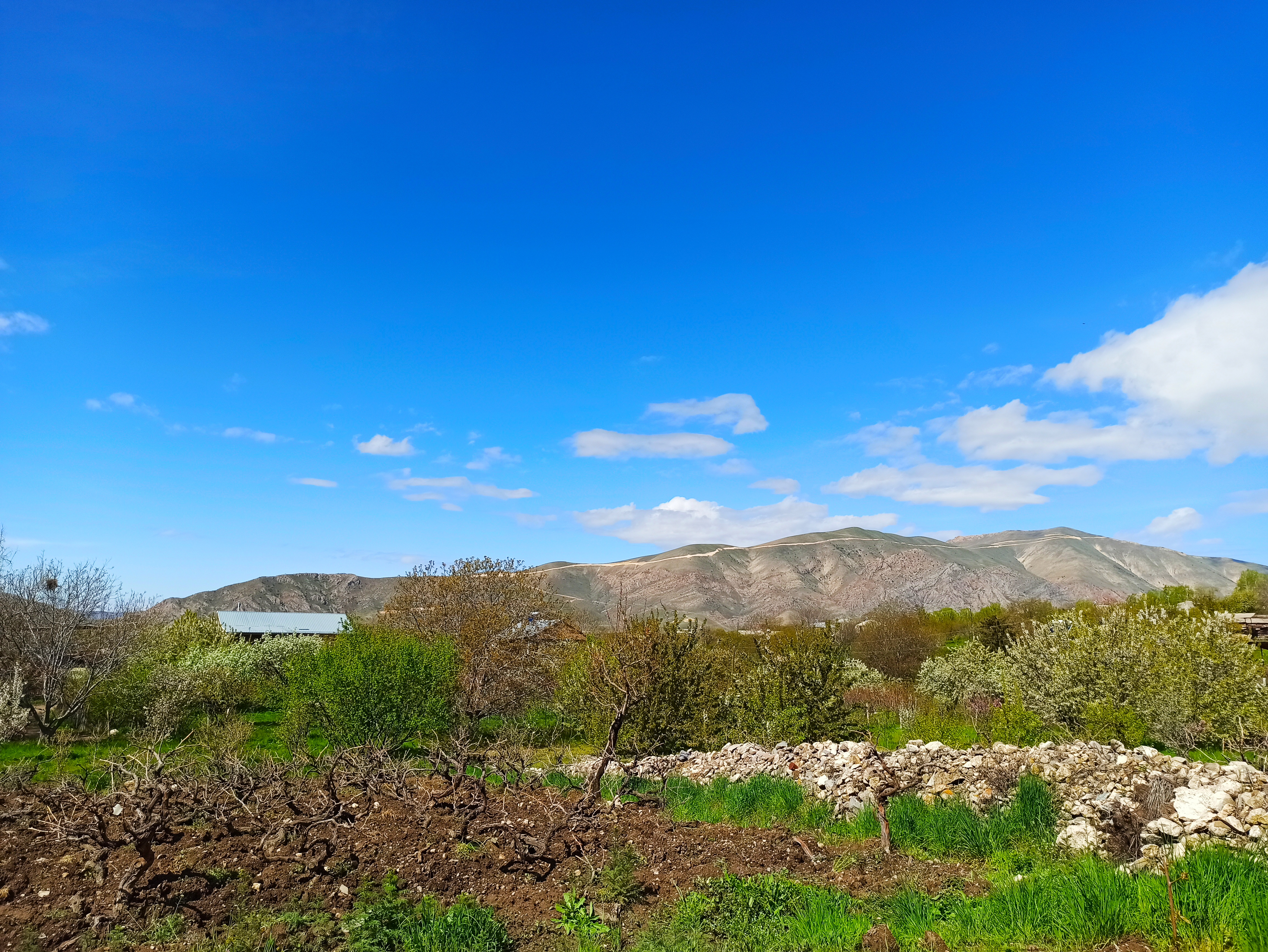

- Location within Armenia Location within Vayots Dzor
- Coordinates: 39°45′35″N 45°10′48″E
- Country: Armenia
- Province: Vayots Dzor
- Municipality: Areni

Population (2011)
  - Total: 1,397
- Time zone: UTC+4 (AMT)
- Website: https://rind.am/en/

Rind (Armenian: Ռինդ) is a village in the Areni Municipality of the Vayots Dzor Province in Armenia.

== Etymology ==
In Armenian, the word rind (ռինդ, ռինտ) has the meanings of beautiful, attractive, worthy of pride.

== History ==
The village was founded in the early 1800s. In 1967, due to a landslide, the old village was depopulated, and the residents moved 3 km west and founded the current village in the "Tap" area.

== Geography ==
The village 25 km west of the regional center, on a peninsula descending to the Arpa valley of the Vardenis mountain range, 1320 m above sea level. The largest water object of the village is Yeghegnalich, the surface of which is 2.12 hectares, and the absolute height of the mirror is 1458 meters.

== Gallery ==
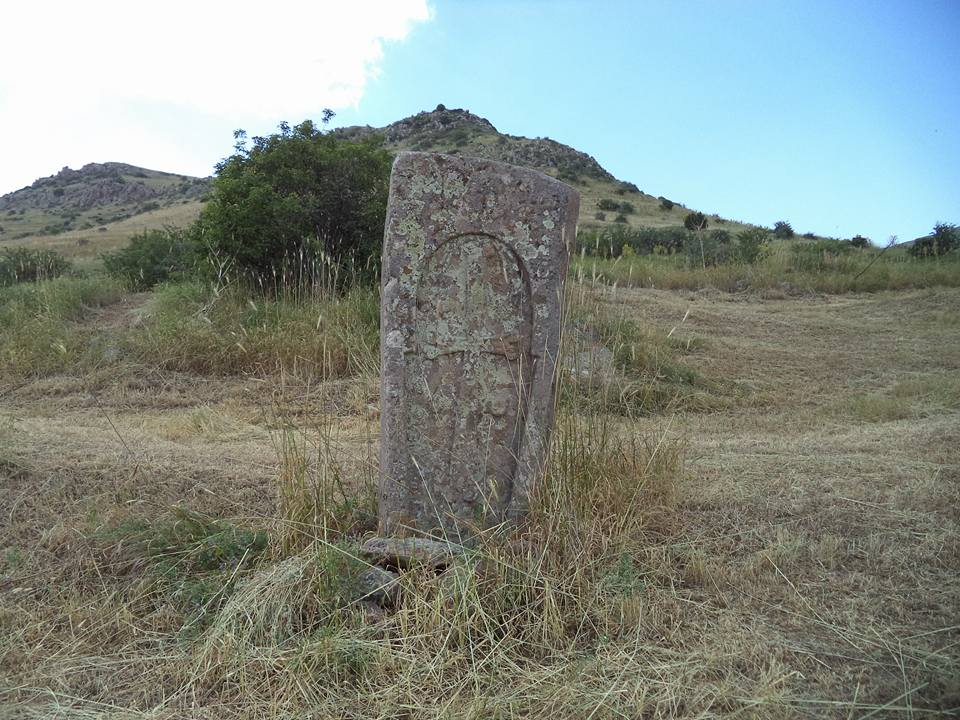
Khachkar

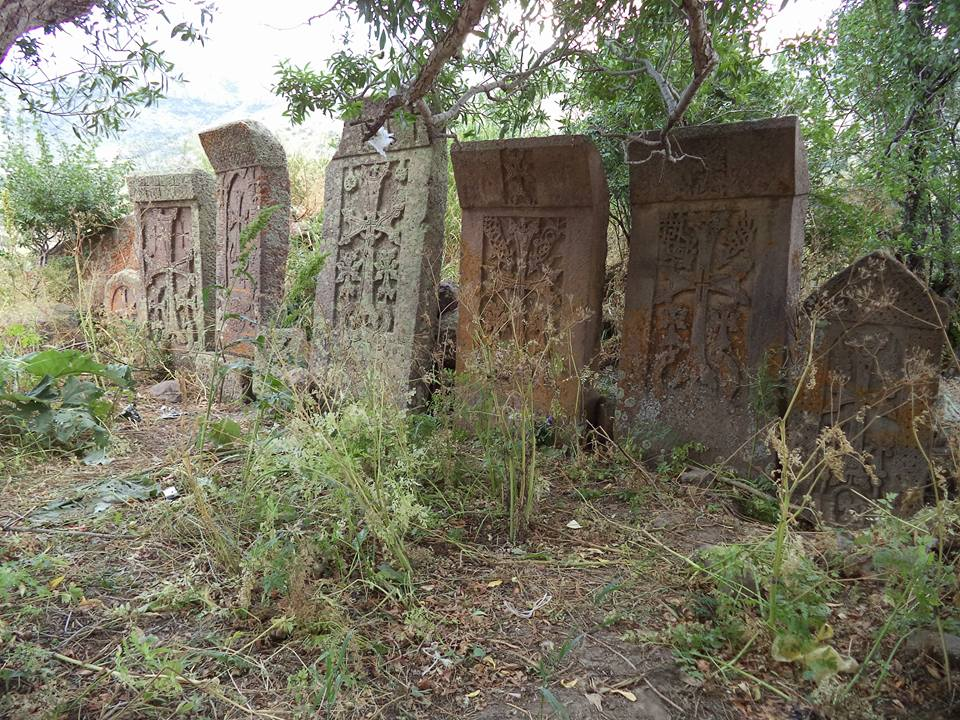
Khachkars

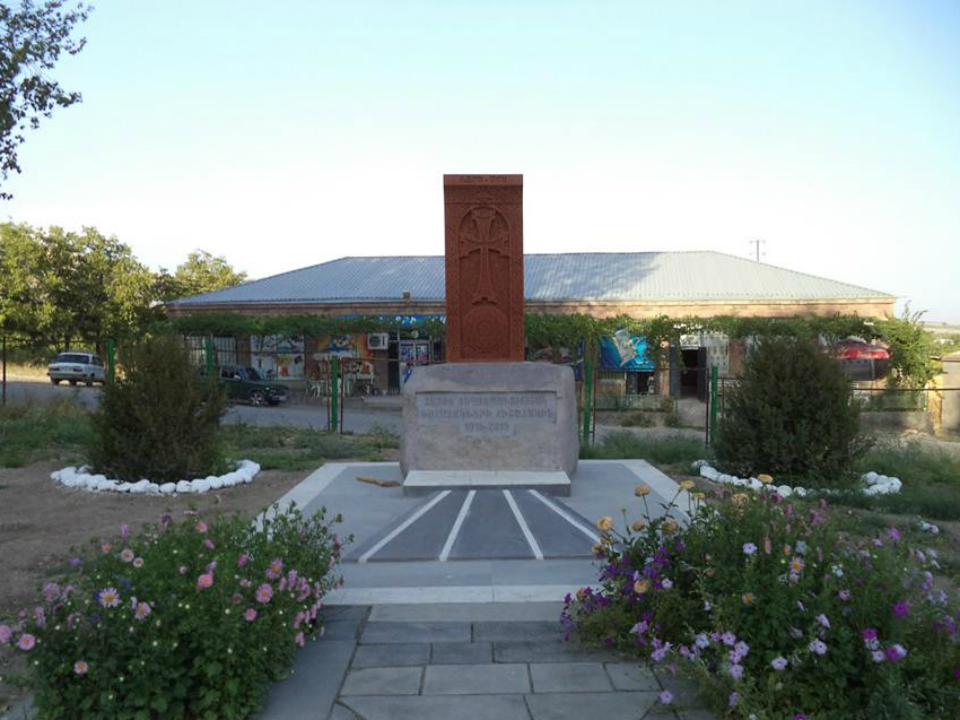
Memorial

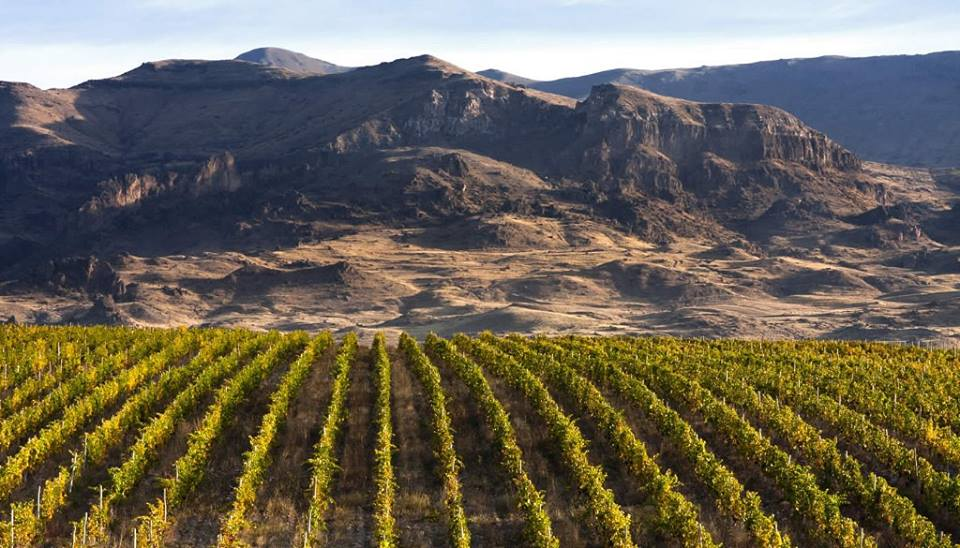
Vineyard

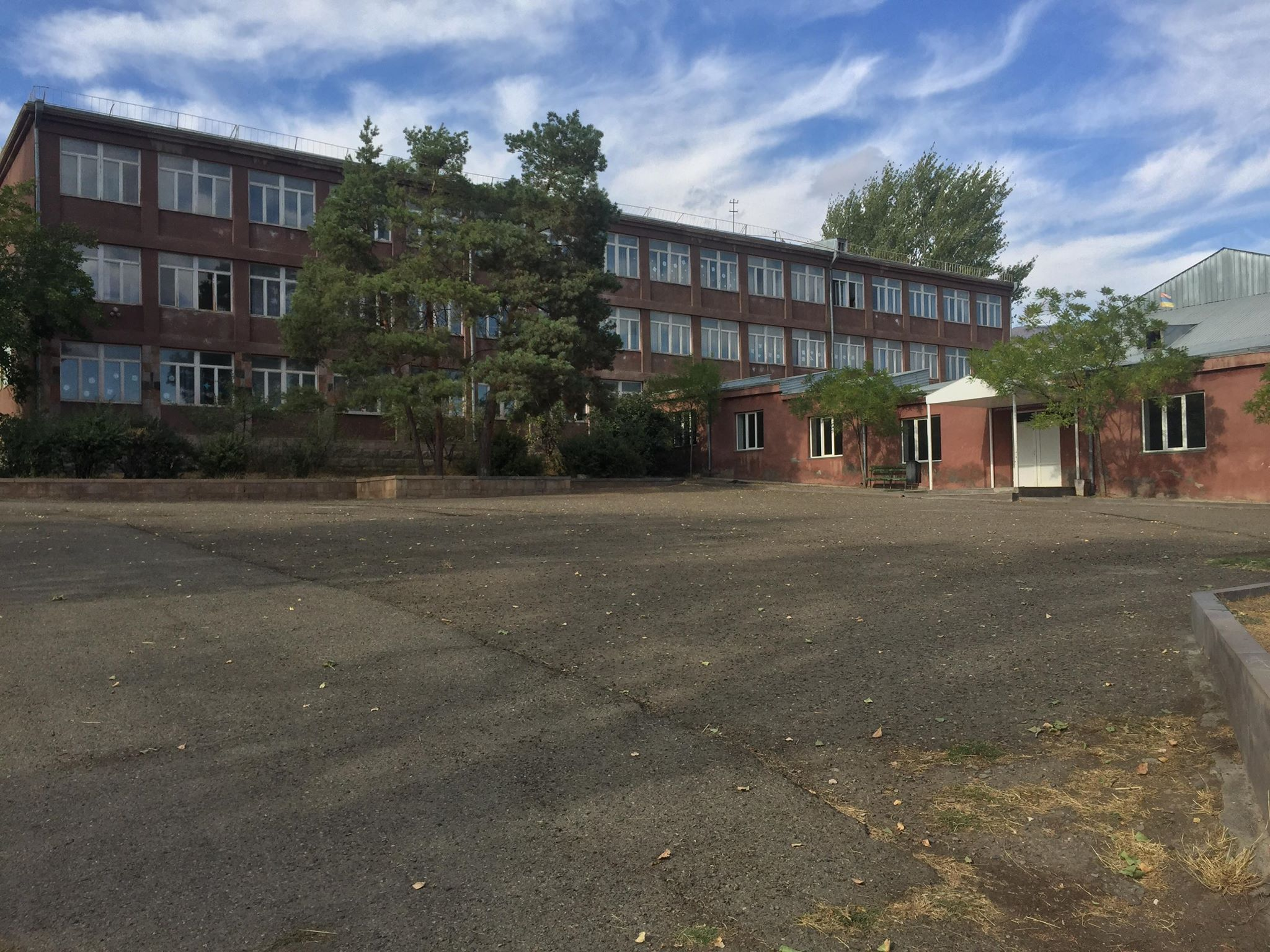
School

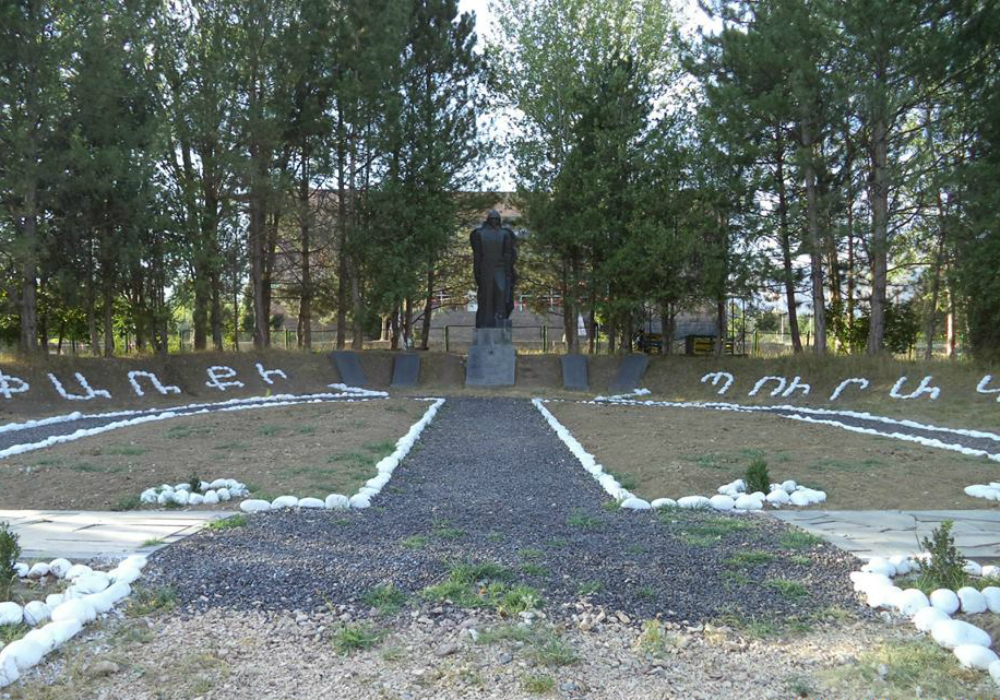
Park

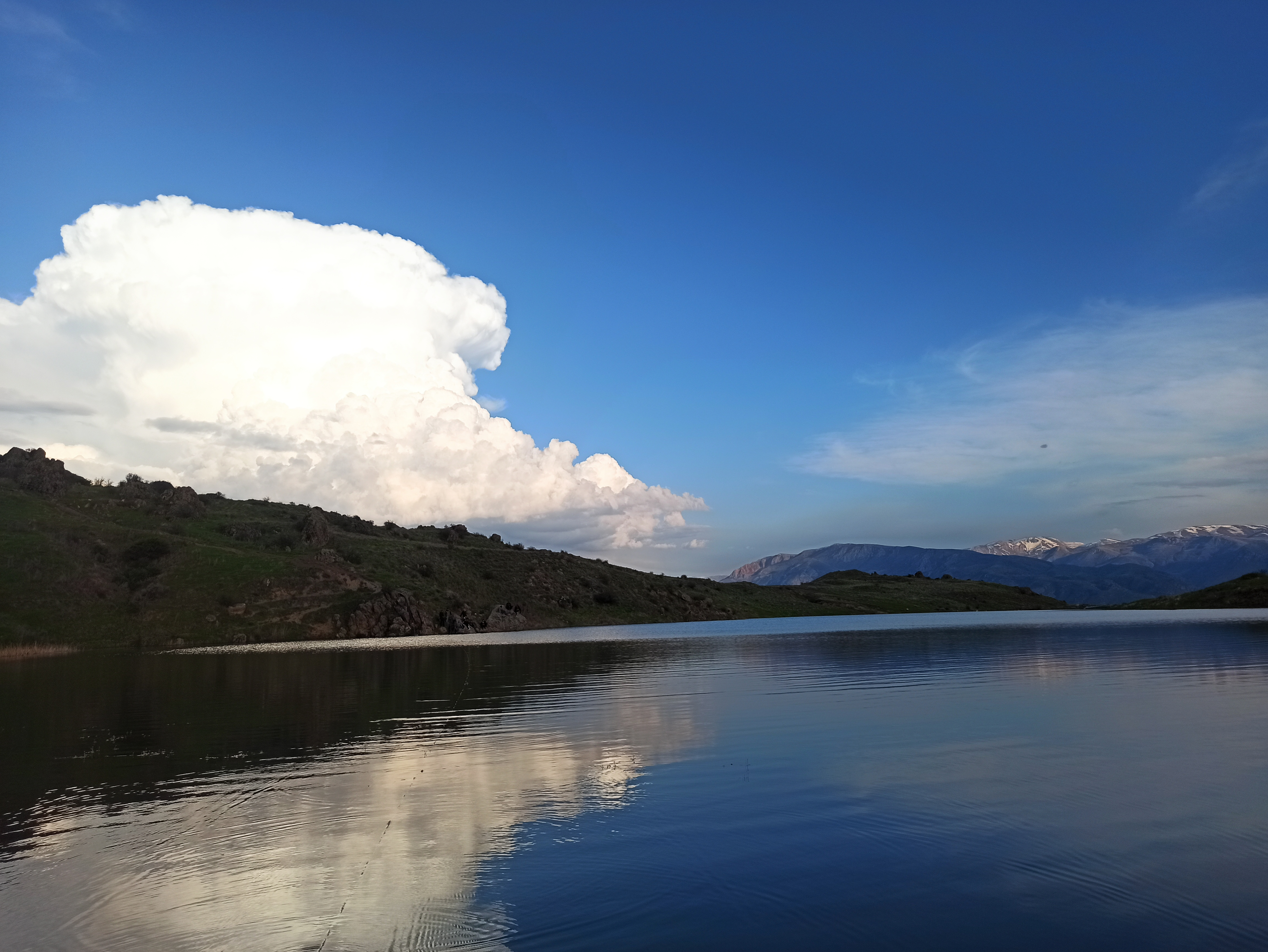
Yeghegnalich lake

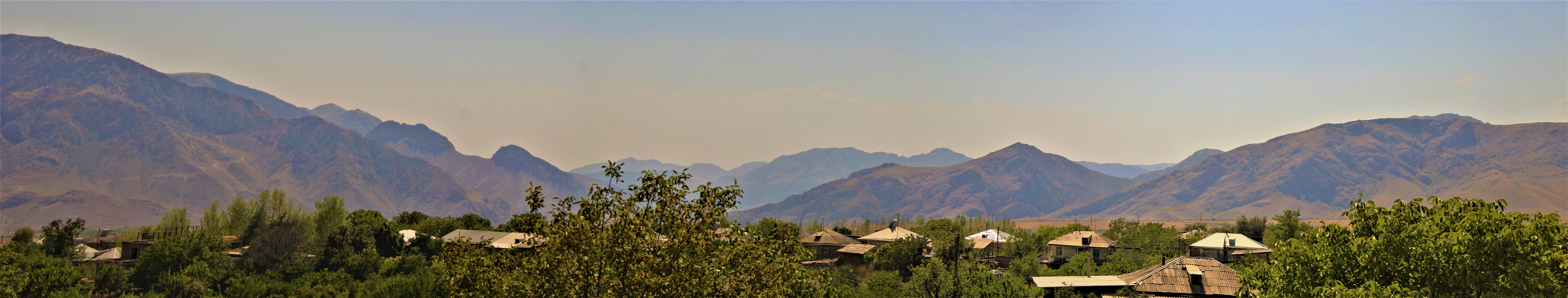
Panorama

== See also ==
- Rock-cut Church of Rind
