= Wali Khan Babar =

Pakistani journalist

- Born: Wali Khan Babar; 5 April 1982
- Died: 13 January 2011 (aged 28); Karachi, Sindh, Pakistan
- Education: Masters in International Relations from the University of Karachi
- Occupation: Journalist
- Employer: Geo News (2008-2011)
- Honours: Pride of Performance

Wali Khan Babar (Urdu, Pashto: ولی خان بابر; 5 April 1982 – 13 January 2011) was a Pakistani journalist working for Geo News who was killed by gunmen in the Liaquatabad area of Karachi. His alleged murderers Saulat Mirza and Faisal Mota (who were alleged target killers of MQM) were sentenced to death by the court on March 10, 2015. The Committee to Protect Journalists (CPJ) declared Babar the first journalist confirmed killed due to his work specifically within the calendar year 2011. Pakistan was the deadliest country for journalists in 2010. Despite the murders of several people associated with the investigation and the death of an accused, in March 2014 four people were convicted and sentenced to life imprisonment for the murder, and two others were given death sentence in absentia.

== Career ==
Babar briefly joined Geo English in 2007 before moving to the mainstream Geo News channel in 2008. He was active in the journalism field for four years.

== Political affiliation ==
Wali Khan Babar was an ex-provincial leader and lifelong worker of PSF (Pashtun Student Federation).

== Investigations ==
From April 2011 till November 2012, various media outlets reported that all five eyewitnesses to the investigation of Babar's case had been murdered in cold blood one by one. The victims included two policemen, a brother of one police officer and an informer linked to developments in the case. All had been shot dead, mostly in drive-by shootings. The Last victim of the cold blooded had already identifies 4 out of 5 murderers of Wali Khan Babar and was called out and shot dead outside his home.

== Reactions ==
He was buried amid protests organised by the Balochistan Union of Journalists and Pakhtun-khwa Milli Awami Party over his death. Journalists in other parts of the country also staged demonstrations, including outside the Karachi Press Club; in Peshawar, gatherings were organised outside the Peshawar Press Club and in Peshawar Cantonment. Scores of protesters expressed anger against the government for "shielding professional killers" and accused the Karachi-based Muttahida Qaumi Movement (MQM) for the killing, saying the party was perpetrating "ethnic cleansing of Pakhtuns, Baloch, Sindhis and the Punjabis" although MQM leader Altaf Hussain denounced the killing. In the meantime, the Council of Pakistan Newspaper Editors termed Wali Khan as a "Martyr of Journalism." The Pashtun Awami National Party announced a three-day mourning period while the Pakistan Federal Union of Journalists (PFUJ) declared a black day during which black flags were hoisted above media centres, press clubs and journalist offices. In a related development, the Human Rights Commission of Pakistan called Babar's killing a "premeditated murder."

The killing was condemned by President Asif Ali Zardari, interior minister Rehman Malik and Pakistan Muslim League (N) leaders Chaudhry Shujaat Hussain and Chaudhry Pervaiz Elahi. In a separate statement, former cricketer and Pakistan Tehreek-e-Insaf chairman Imran Khan expressed his condolences and questioned the government's seriousness over addressing target killings. The Provincial Assembly of Khyber Pakhtunkhwa ordered a judicial inquiry following the news. An FIR was accordingly filed by the police to investigate the murder. A special segment was presented on his killing in Hamid Mir's current affairs program Capital Talk.

On World Press Freedom Day, 2011, participants of a forum at the National Press Club and Newseum in Washington, D.C., called attention to world governments who licensed to punish news organisations that were critical of the government, as was the case for Pakistan that had used licensing to punish Geo News, for which Wali Khan had worked.

== Personal life ==
Wali Khan was an ethnic Pashtun belonging to the Babar tribe. He hailed from the town of Zhob in Balochistan and was a vocal critic of the state's policies pertaining to the Balochistan conflict.

He held a master's degree in international relations from the University of Karachi.

Before his death, he resided in Karachi's North Nazimabad suburb.

He left behind a widow mother, three sisters and four brothers.

His body was buried in Zhob, his hometown.

== Perpetrators ==
On 26 May 2012, news reports emerged that a primary suspect accused in Babar's murder had been killed during a police encounter with robbers in the Seaview area of Clifton, Karachi. The man was identified as Liaqat Ali. According to the police, Liaqat's car had been used in the shooting of Wali Khan Babar. Liaqat was with a gang of armed robbers at the time he was killed in the police encounter.

The police's encounter with the suspect was controversial. The family of Liaquat Ali claimed that police encounter was an extrajudicial killing. According to his family, Liaqat recently arrived home on Friday from Punjab. He was arrested in the vicinity of Gulshan-e-Iqbal. According to his family, the police first took him to the highway and then told him to run, they then shot him and his acquaintance in the back, and let them to die before getting them to hospital. The cause of death was excessive bleeding.

In March 2014, a special anti-terrorism court sentenced Naveed Polka, Muhammad Ali Rizvi, Faisal Mahmood, and Mohammad Shahrukh Khan to life in prison for the murder of Wali Khan Babar. Kamran and Faisal Mota were given death sentences in absentia.

== See also ==
- Violence against journalists in Pakistan
