= 2026 Quetta train bombing =

Train bombing in Quetta, Pakistan

- Part of the insurgency in Balochistan
- Location of the bombing near Chaman Phatak, Quetta
- Location: 30°12′08″N 67°00′09″E near Chaman Phatak, Quetta, Balochistan, Pakistan
- Date: 24 May 2026 c. 8:00 a.m. (PKT)
- Target: Shuttle train carrying security personnel and family members
- Attack type: Vehicle-borne suicide bombing, mass murder
- Weapon: Explosives-laden vehicle
- Deaths: 47+
- Injuries: 98+
- Perpetrators: Balochistan Liberation Army; Majeed Brigade
- Assailant: Bilal Shahwani ‡‡

On 24 May 2026, a vehicle-borne suicide bombing targeted a shuttle train near Chaman Phatak in Quetta, Balochistan, Pakistan. The explosion killed at least 47 people and injured 98 others.

The train was carrying Pakistani security personnel and their family members from Quetta's cantonment area to connect with the Jaffar Express. The Balochistan Liberation Army claimed responsibility for the attack.

== Background ==
Quetta is the capital of Balochistan, a province affected by a long-running separatist insurgency. Militants in the province have targeted security forces, government installations, civilians and infrastructure.

Before the 2026 bombing, there had been several high-profile incidents involving railway and security targets in Balochistan, including the 2024 Quetta railway station bombing and the 2025 Jaffar Express hijacking.

The BLA has claimed that the Pakistani government profits from Balochistan's mineral resources without sufficient benefit to local communities.

A day before the attack, nine suspected militants and four officials from the Counter Terrorism Department were killed in a shootout on the outskirts of Quetta.

== Attack ==
Shortly after 8 a.m. PKT, an explosives-laden vehicle struck one of the carriages of a shuttle train near Chaman Phatak as the train was travelling through Quetta.

Railway authorities said the train was travelling from Quetta Cantonment towards the city's railway station, where passengers were to connect with the Jaffar Express. Reuters, citing Pakistan's railways ministry, reported that the blast derailed the engine and three coaches, and that two coaches overturned.

The explosion occurred in a residential area and damaged nearby buildings and vehicles. Images and videos from the scene showed burned vehicles, damaged buildings, smoke and train carriages on their sides.

Police, the Counter-Terrorism Department, bomb disposal personnel, security forces and rescue workers responded to the site. Pakistan Railways dispatched rescue trucks and a relief train.

== Casualties ==
Rescue officials said 47 people were killed, including 20 soldiers, and 98 others were injured.

Officials said security personnel, passengers, bystanders and residents of nearby houses were among the casualties. The Balochistan government said three Frontier Corps personnel and a family of four were among those killed. Women and children were also reported among the injured.

A medical emergency was declared in public hospitals in Quetta, and doctors, paramedics and other staff were ordered to remain on duty. According to the Associated Press, doctors said 20 of the injured were in critical condition.

== Aftermath ==
The Balochistan Liberation Army (BLA) claimed responsibility for the attack and said it had targeted security personnel on the train. Reuters reported that it could not independently verify the group's casualty claim.

=== Perpetrator ===
The BLA identified the alleged bomber as 25-year-old Bilal Shahwani, a resident of Killi Sarde, and said he was a member of the Majeed Brigade. Pakistani security forces reportedly raided Shahwani's home and detained several of his relatives.

== Reactions ==
=== Domestic ===
Security forces cordoned off the area after the explosion, and the district administration established a control room at the office of the Quetta deputy commissioner. The provincial Home Department also activated a monitoring and coordination cell.

Prime Minister Shehbaz Sharif, President Asif Ali Zardari, Balochistan chief minister Sarfraz Bugti, railways minister Hanif Abbasi and Deputy Prime Minister Ishaq Dar condemned the attack.

The Human Rights Commission of Pakistan said it was alarmed by the security situation in Balochistan and by attacks on civilians, workers, passengers, law enforcement personnel and public infrastructure.

=== International ===
China, Qatar and Saudi Arabia condemned the attack.

António Guterres, the secretary-general of the United Nations, condemned the attack and wished a swift recovery to those affected.

The Afghan Ministry of Foreign Affairs, the United States Embassy in Islamabad, the Chinese Embassy in Islamabad and Global Affairs Canada also condemned the attack.

Iran's ambassador to Pakistan, Reza Amiri-Moghadam, condemned the attack, describing it as a "cowardly and heinous suicide terrorist act," stating "Terrorism is a condemnable phenomenon in all its forms all over the world."

== See also ==
- 2025 Jaffar Express hijacking
- 2026 in Pakistan
- 2026 Afghanistan–Pakistan war
- Jan–Feb 2026 Balochistan attacks
- Insurgency in Balochistan
- List of terrorist incidents in 2026
