= Terrorist incidents in Pakistan in 2024 =

This article is about terrorist incidents in Pakistan in 2024 in chronological order.

== January ==
- 10 January - Three police officers and one civilian was killed in a terrorist attack in Kohat.
- 29 January - One person was injured in a gun attack on ANP leader in Shangla Khyber Pakhtunkhwa.
- 29 January - One police officer was killed and one truck driver injured in a rocket attack on Mach Jail in Balochistan.
- 30 January - Four people were killed and six were injured in a bomb blast in Balochistan.
- 31 January - Five people were injured in a grenade attack on the election office of PPP in Quetta.
- 31 January - Rehan Zeb Khan, election candidate, was killed in gun attack in Bajaur, Khyber Pakhtunkhwa. Three other people were also injured in the attack.

== February ==
- 1 February - Zahoor Ahmad of ANP was killed in gun attack in Killa Abdullah Balochistan. One person was injured in the attack.
- 2 February - A bomb blast targeted the office of Election Commission of Pakistan in Karachi.
- 5 February - 10 police officers were killed and six were injured in a terrorist attack on Chodwan police station in Dera Ismail Khan.
- 7 February - Two bomb blasts in Pakistan's southwestern province of Balochistan killed at least 22 people with more injured.

== March ==
- 16 March – Seven soldiers including a lieutenant colonel and a captain were killed in a terrorist attack in the Mir Ali area of North Waziristan district.
- 20 March - 10 people (including 2 soldiers) were killed in a bomb blast and gun attack by the BLA militants at Gwadar Port Authority Complex.
- 26 March - 6 killed (including one paramilitary soldier) in a militant attack on Pakistan naval airbase.
- 26 March - Five Chinese nationals killed in suicide bomb attack in Pakistan.
- 30 March – One person killed and 14 others, including three soldiers, are injured in a bomb attack in Harnai District, Balochistan.

== May ==
- 14 May – An army major was killed in Sambaza during an intelligence based operation.
- 26 May – A captain and a soldier were killed in an Intelligence based operation in hassan khel area, Peshawar.

== June ==
- 9 June - an improvised explosive device (IED) killed 7 Pakistani soldiers including a captain. The device exploded near a security convoy in Lakki Marwat, a district in the Khyber Pakhtunkhwa province bordering Afghanistan. No group claimed responsibility.
- 11 June - the Pakistani army reportedly killed 11 militants in response to the bombing. The overnight operation was conducted in a former stronghold of the Pakistani Taliban.

== July ==
- 15 July – A HGB attack on Pakistani cantonment in Bannu claimed the lives of 8 pakistani soldiers.
- 22 July – a government Girls' High School in Mir Ali, District North Waziristan was destroyed by unidentified persons using bombs.

== August ==
- 26 August - At least 73 people were killed when separatist militants attacked police stations, railway lines and highways and security forces launched retaliatory operations in Balochistan province.

== October ==
- 7 October - Two Chinese nationals were killed and at least 10 others were injured in a suspected suicide attack near Jinnah International Airport in Karachi. A Pakistani separatist group reportedly targeted a convoy of Chinese nationals at Karachi Airport, killing at least two people and injuring ten others. The Baloch Liberation Army (BLA), a separatist militant group, reportedly claimed responsibility for the attack. In a statement, the BLA said it had "targeted a high-level convoy" of Chinese investors and engineers. The regional government of Sindh province reported on the social media platform X (formerly Twitter) that a "tanker" had exploded on the airport motorway, contributing to the casualties. A statement from the separatist group identified the incident as a suicide attack and named the assailant, a member of the BLA's Majeed Brigade, a suicide squad. The group has frequently targeted Chinese nationals in the region, alleging that ethnic Baloch residents are being deprived of their rightful share of wealth from foreign investments and the extraction of natural resources in the province. In response, the Chinese embassy expressed the hope that Pakistan would conduct a thorough investigation and "severely punish the perpetrator." Among the injured were a police constable and a woman. Prime Minister Sharif met with the Chinese Ambassador, promising to personally oversee the investigation into the attack.
- 11 October - At least 21 coal miners, including three Afghans, were killed and six others injured in a terrorist attack in Duki District, Balochistan.

== November ==
- 1 November - 9 people including three children were killed and 29 were injured in Mastung, Balochistan.
- 9 November - At least 32 people, including the perpetrator were killed and 55 others are injured in a suicide bombing at the Quetta railway station in Quetta, Balochistan.
- 21 November - 2024 Kurram attack: At least 54 people were killed in an attack by unidentified people on a passenger convoy in Khyber Pakhtunkhwa province.

== December ==
- 20 December - On the night of 20th December a militant assault on a FC Security checkpost in Makeen, South Waziristan killed 16 pakistani soldiers.\

== See also ==
- 2024 in Pakistan
- Terrorist incidents in Pakistan in 2023
- Terrorist incidents in Pakistan in 2025
