= Terrorist incidents in Pakistan in 2026 =

This article is about terrorist incidents in Pakistan in 2026 in chronological order.

== January ==
- 12 January – Seven police officers were killed in a bomb attack on their vehicle in Tank District, Khyber Pakhtunkhwa. The Islamist militant group Tehreek-e-Taliban Pakistan claimed responsibility for the attack
- 15 January – Twelve Balochistan Liberation Army militants were killed in an attack on a police station and two banks in Kharan District, Balochistan.
- 23 January – Seven people were killed in a suicide bombing at a wedding held at the residence of a community leader in Dera Ismail Khan District, Khyber Pakhtunkhwa.
- 31 January – A series of attacks were carried out by the BLA on multiple locations across Balochistan, leaving 36 civilians, 22 members of the security forces, and more than 226 militants and insurgents dead.

== February ==
- 6 February – At least 31 people were killed in a suicide bombing at an Imambarga (a Shia mosque) in Islamabad.
- 11 February – Four police officers were killed in an ambush by militants on their vehicle in Dera Ismail Khan District, Khyber Pakhtunkhwa.
- 12 February – At least one person was killed and three others were injured, including an army official, in a bomb attack in Chilas on a vehicle belonging to the Frontier Works Organization.
- 16 February –
  - Two people were killed while 15 were injured in a motorcycle bombing near a police station in Bannu District, Khyber Pakhtunkhwa.
  - Three security personnel were killed while conducting an operation in Kabalgram.
  - Eleven security personnel and one child were killed in a vehicle bombing on a checkpoint in Bajaur.
- 18 February – Two officials were killed and two others injured when militants attacked a police station and a customs office in Dera Ismail Khan.
- 21 February – Two soldiers, including a lieutenant colonel, and five militants were killed in a motorcycle bombing on a convoy in Bannu District, Khyber Pakhtunkhwa.
- 23 February – Three security personnel belonging to the Frontier Corps were killed in Karak District when militants opened fire on an ambulance carrying wounded personnel following a drone attack.
- 24 February –
  - Six policemen including a deputy sub inspector were killed when militants ambushed a police van in Kohat.
  - Two police officers were killed in a suicide bombing near a checkpoint in Bhakkar District.
- 25 February –
  - Three security personnel were killed and another injured when militants opened fire on a security vehicle near Chaman.
  - Four police officers were killed in an attack on a patrol in Bajaur District, Khyber Pakhtunkhwa.

== March ==
- 7 March –
  - At least 10 people were killed and several others were critically injured in a suspected bombing at a filling station in Wana, South Waziristan District, Khyber Pakhtunkhwa.
  - At least four people were killed, including two policemen, and more than 35 others were injured, including three seriously, in two separate bombings targeting a police patrol van and a market in Wana and Lakki Marwat District, Khyber Pakhtunkhwa.
- 16 March – Five soldiers were killed and several others are injured in a roadside bombing in Duki District, Balochistan.

== April ==
- 3 April – Five people were killed while 13 others were injured in a suicide bombing in Bannu District, Khyber Pakhtunkhwa.
- 12 April – Three Pakistan Coast Guard personnel were killed in an ambush by the BLA on a patrol boat in the Arabian Sea near Gwadar.
- 23 April – Nine people were killed in an attack on a National Resources Limited mining site in Chagai.

== May ==
- 9 May – At least three police officers were killed in a suicide bombing and shooting in Bannu District, Khyber Pakhtunkhwa.
- 10 May – At least 21 police officers were killed in Fateh Khel in Bannu District due to a car bombing at a police post carried out by Ittehad-ul-Mujahideen Pakistan.
- 12 May – Nine people including two police officers were killed in a rickshaw bombing on a bazaar in Lakki Marwat, Khyber Pakhtunkhwa.
- 13 May – Five army soldiers, including a major, were killed and another was critically injured in a roadside IED blast targeting an artillery unit in the Bala Dhaka area of Barkhan District, Balochistan.
- 14 May – A suicide attack on a scouts camp in Bajaur, Khyber Pakhtunkhwa, killed one civilian and at least eight security personnel, while 35 others were wounded after an explosives-laden vehicle attempted to enter the camp.
- 18 May – An improvised explosive device explosion in a market in Wana, South Waziristan, killed at least three people and injured four others, according to police. The blast reportedly targeted the vehicle of the head of the Ahmedzai tribe, who was among those killed. No group has claimed responsibility for the attack.
- 18 May – Two police officers escorting polio vaccination workers were killed in separate ambushes in Bajaur District, Khyber Pakhtunkhwa.
- 24 May – At least 47 people were killed and 100 injured in a suicide bombing on a train transporting military personnel in Quetta. The BLA claimed responsibility.

== June ==
- 20 June – Seven people were killed in two successive roadside bomb attacks in Bannu District, Khyber Pakhtunkhwa.
- 27 June – Three Sindh Rangers personnel and at least three militants were killed in an attack on the Karachi headquarters, the attack was then claimed by Jamaat-ul-Ahrar.

== July ==
- 4 July – The BLA claimed responsibility for a suicide attack on a Pakistan Coast Guards camp in Jiwani, Balochistan, claiming to have killed more than 30 security personnel. Pakistani authorities said two soldiers and one coast guard officer were killed while 15 were injured.
- 5 July – Four civilians were killed and nine others injured in an attack on Killi Babri village in the Hanna Urak valley on the outskirts of Quetta.
- 7 July – Nine police officers, including two station house officers (SHOs), were killed in an attack on a police post in the Mangi Dam area of Ziarat District, Balochistan. Authorities said 15 militants were killed in clearing operations.
- 8 July – Eleven soldiers, including a junior commissioned officer (JCO), were killed in an ambush on an army convoy in the Bela–Winder area of Lasbela District, Balochistan.
- 24 July – Fifteen people, including 12 soldiers were killed in a suicide bombing claimed by the TTP in Tank District.

== August ==
- 2 August – At least 14 people were killed in a suicide bombing at an antimilitant rally in Kabal Tehsil, Khyber Pakhtunhkwa.

== September ==
- 18–19 September – At least 31 people, including 16 police personnel were killed in an assault on a police facility in Kohat. The Ittihad-ul-Mujahideen Pakistan claimed the attack.
- 26 September – Eleven people were killed in an bomb attack in Dera Ismail Khan claimed by the TTP.

== November ==
- 12 November – 10 policemen being killed in an ambush by militants in Kohat.

== See also ==
- 2026 in Pakistan
