= 2026 Balochistan attacks =

2026 Balochistan attacks may refer to:

- Jan–Feb 2026 Balochistan attacks
- July 2026 Balochistan attacks
