= 2025 Jaffar Express hijacking =

Train hijacking in Balochistan, Pakistan

- Part of the insurgency in Balochistan
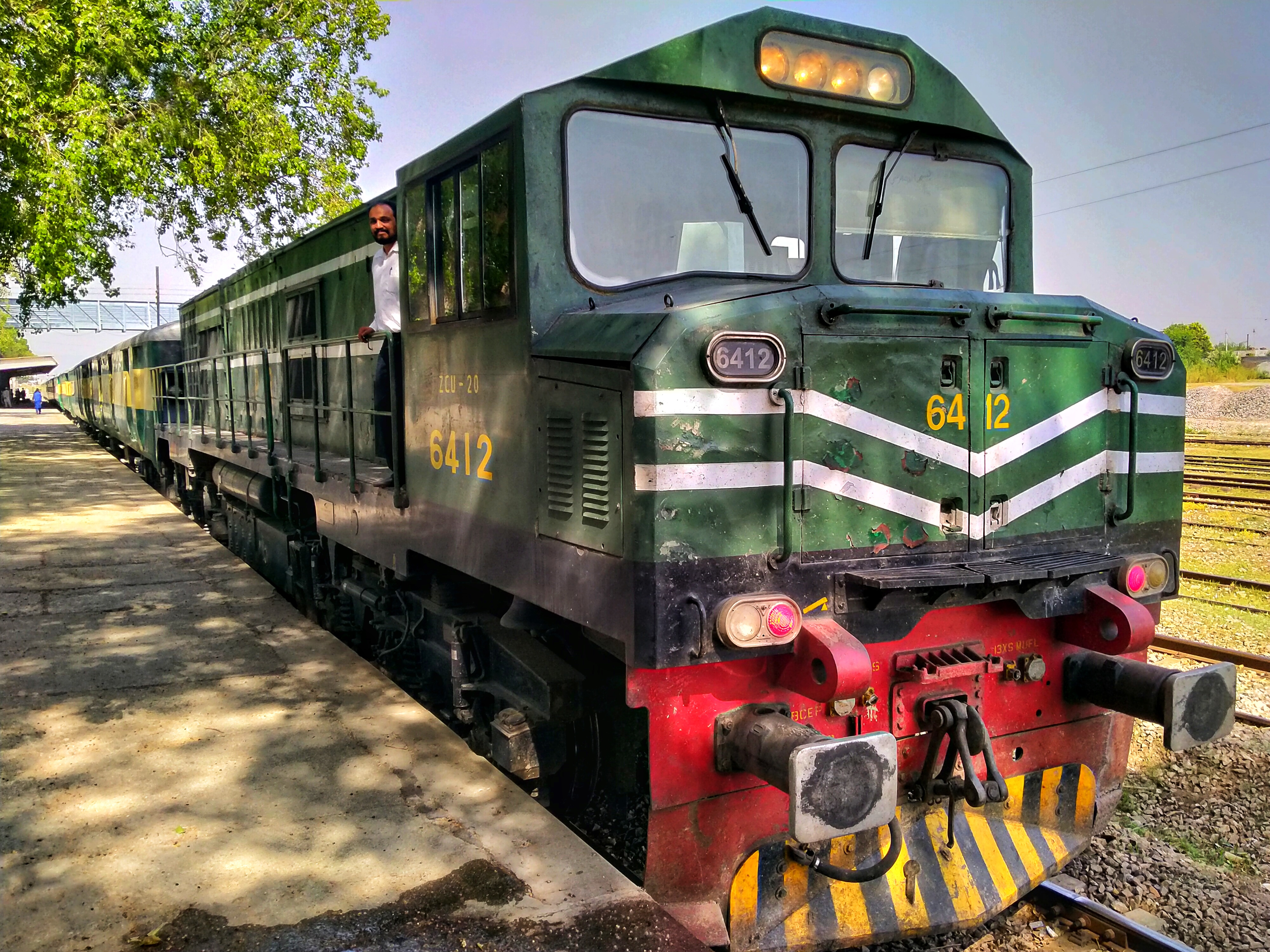
- Jaffar Express train pictured in 2021
- Location: 29°38′47″N 67°34′15″E; Bolan Pass, Sibi, Balochistan, Pakistan
- Date: 11 March 2025 c. 1:15 p.m. (PST)
- Target: Civilians, off-duty security personnel
- Attack type: Hijacking, hostage-taking, mass shooting, bombings, shootout, ambush
- Weapons: IEDs, rocket launchers, automatic firearms, suicide vests, sniper rifles
- Deaths: 64 (including 33 militants)
- Injuries: 38
- Victims: 380
- Perpetrators: Balochistan Liberation Army; Majeed Brigade; Fateh squad; Special Tactical Operations Squad
- No. of participants: 33 (Note: However, a police officer who was a hostage in the train reported "hundreds".)
- Defenders: Pakistan Armed Forces; Pakistan Army; Civil Armed Forces; Frontier Corps

The Jaffar Express, a Pakistani passenger train travelling from Quetta to Peshawar with at least 380 passengers on board, was hijacked by the Balochistan Liberation Army (BLA) on 11 March 2025. The attackers detonated explosives in tunnels and on the train tracks before opening fire on the train, halting it in a mountainous region which was difficult for authorities to access. The organisation issued a 48-hour ultimatum for Baloch political prisoners to be released or they would execute hostages, although they had already released some. As a result, Pakistan Railways temporarily suspended its train operations between Balochistan and the provinces of Punjab and Sindh.

From 11 to 12 March 2025, the Pakistan Armed Forces launched an operation, codenamed Operation Green Bolan, to raid the hijacked train multiple times, eventually releasing 354 hostages and killing the 33 BLA insurgents. Pakistani officials said at least 64 people, including 18 soldiers on leave who were identified among the passengers and killed by the attackers, and 33 attackers, were killed during the incident, while 38 other passengers were injured.

In response to the insurgency, the Pakistani political parties unanimously passed a resolution condemning it during a National Assembly session. Shehbaz Sharif, the Prime Minister of Pakistan, condemned the attack as "cowardly acts", sent condolences to the victims' families and, after the resolution of the crisis, said that the BLA members had been "sent to hell". The attack on civilians by BLA was universally condemned by various global figures, who voiced their support towards Pakistan against terrorism. Afghanistan and India, historically having been accused of assisting the BLA by Pakistan, have both denied claims of involvement in the attack. Following the attack, Pakistan Railways implemented plans to increase patrol forces in the country's various railway systems and more thoroughly inspect passengers and transport vehicles to prevent similar attacks. Additionally, both surveillance drones and closed-circuit television cameras were set to be utilised to further monitor train and railway activity upon resumed operations. Protests in Balochistan, organised by the Baloch Yakjehti Committee (BYC), began on 20 March 2025 in part due to police crackdown on civilians gathering at the Quetta Civil Hospital to identify bodies from the train hijacking.

== Background ==
The province of Balochistan has been involved in insurgencies and conflicts by Baloch separatists against the government of Pakistan since at least 1948. This is due to the alleged forced disappearances and violations of the rights of Baloch people by the Pakistan army and extreme poverty as well as under-developed infrastructure in Balochistan. Since 2001, armed groups in the region have conducted various violent attacks and campaigns to discourage major development in the region that they believe would benefit other provinces.

The Balochistan Liberation Army (BLA) is a Baloch ethnonationalist group founded in 2000. Members of the organisation stated that their intentions were to achieve regional independence from Pakistan and control over the land's natural resources, primarily its oil and minerals. The faction had previously launched attacks on civilians and, most often, Pakistani security forces. BLA also targets Chinese nationals within the region, as they had been involved in economic infrastructure networking as part of the China–Pakistan Economic Corridor. It has officially been banned in Pakistan since 2006. Pakistan had previously accused India and Afghanistan of backing anti-Pakistani militants, which both BLA and the respective countries have denied. Since then, BLA has launched multiple terrorist attacks that resulted in the deaths of many people; among the most recent attacks in the region prior to the 2025 train hijacking was a November 2024 bombing at Quetta railway station that killed 32. The Jaffar Express passenger train was previously attacked by the BLA near the town of Machh on 7 October 2016 via two explosions that killed six people and injured 19 others.

== Hijacking ==
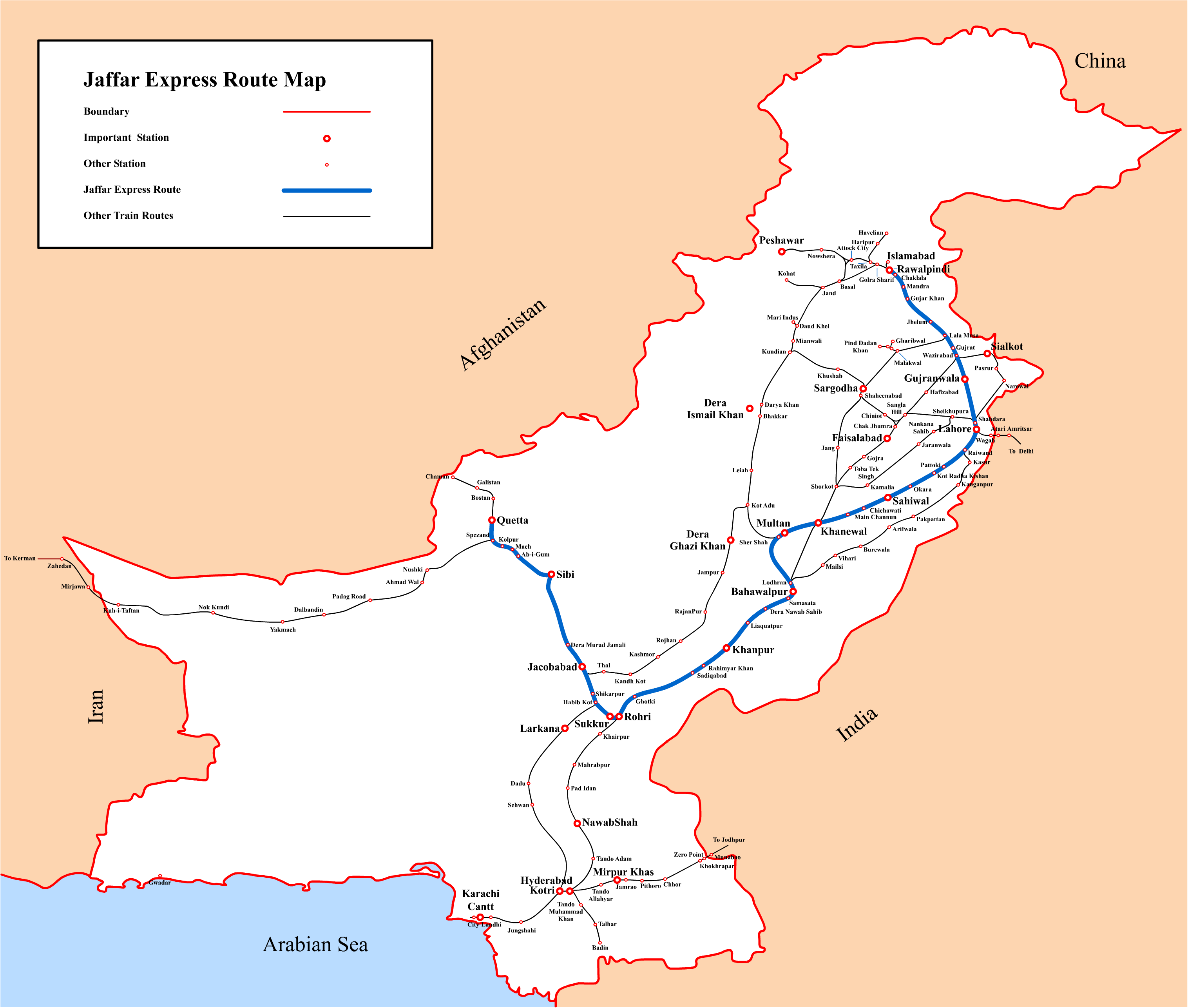
Map of the Jaffar Express route from Quetta to Peshawar

At 9 a.m. on 11 March 2025, the Jaffar Express train departed Quetta en route to Peshawar, a journey of around 1,600 kilometres (990 mi). The train consisted of nine coaches and the locomotive. Around 450 passengers were reported to have been on board, including military personnel. Prior to the attack, the BLA insurgents sabotaged the train tracks with 8 improvised explosive devices, so that the train would stop within the mountainous area. The explosives detonation caused the train's fuel tank to explode, causing a sudden halt and four coaches to derail. Some 157 kilometres (98 mi) from Quetta and about 21 kilometres (13 mi) west of the city of Sibi, the BLA hijacked the train inside Tunnel No. 8, between Pehro Kunri and Mushkaf stations. The group blew up explosives on the train tracks before opening fire on the train.

Five police officers and two Frontier Corps (FC) personnel escorted the train, and, according to one police officer, "hundreds" of militants surrounded the tracks. The BLA insurgents were equipped with launchers and guns and threatened to kill people if they did not come out of the train. The defenders fought and engaged with the attackers, giving resistance for over an hour and a half until they were depleted of ammunition which resulted in the defenders eventually being defenceless. The assistant train driver Saad Qamar used wireless communications to warn a nearby train station about the attack, but it was cut off after the engine was turned off to prevent fire from the leaking diesel cans hit by gunfire.

As soon as the train stopped, dozens of militants came down from the mountains and boarded the train and separated women and men into groups and checked their identification cards. According to the testimony of a passenger, the assailants did not harm women or elderly people, although another witness stated that the BLA generally rounded hostages up by ethnicity but also executed soldiers or people they did not like on the spot. Because the hijacking occurred in an isolated mountainous area, the fate of the hostages was not immediately clear. According to Shahid Rind, the Balochistan provincial government spokesman, the surrounding terrain prevented authorities from quickly reaching the area. Pakistan Railways temporarily suspended its train operations between Balochistan and Punjab and Sindh in response to the attack.

As night fell, most of the attackers withdrew, leaving only 20 to 25 men behind to guard the captives. In the darkness, some hostages attempted to flee, but the militants opened fire. At dawn, when FC reinforcements arrived, drawing the militants' focus, several people, including a police officer, managed to escape.

The hostages were reported to be mostly law enforcement personnel and non-Baloch civilians. The militants kept a close watch on the train's security personnel and warned authorities against attempting to rescue the hostages themselves. Some of the insurgents were equipped with suicide bombs and sat next to the hostages to further prevent an easy rescue by authorities. The BLA spokesman Jeeyand Baloch offered exchanges between the train hostages and jailed militants. The BLA released some civilian hostages such as Balochistan residents, the elderly, women, and children while keeping those who were government workers or military personnel on leave to return to their homes in Punjab for Ramadan. The same day that the hijacking occurred, BLA issued a 48-hour ultimatum to the Pakistani government in which political prisoners, including Baloch movement affiliates, were to be unconditionally released. The next day, it threatened to "punish" five hostages for each hour after the ultimatum had expired. Pakistani officials said they then were yet to communicate with anyone on the train as the area has no internet and mobile network coverage.

== Rescue ==
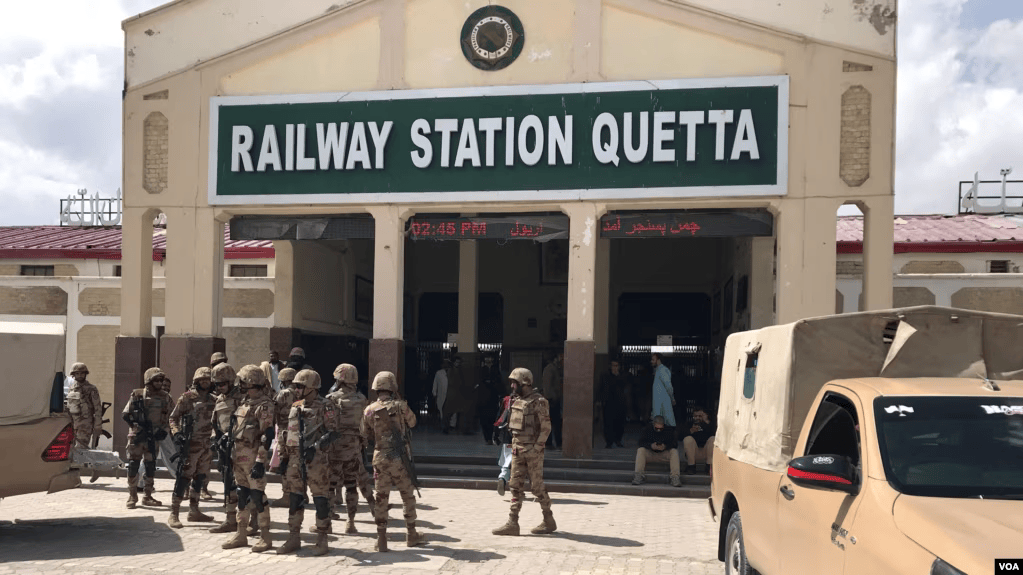
Frontier Corps personnel stationed at the Quetta railway station, 12 March

Pakistani security forces launched a large-scale counter-operation — named Operation Green Bolan — at the site. The security forces engaged in the conflict, freeing a majority of the hostages and killing most of the insurgents. Lasting for over 30 hours, the hostage crisis concluded on 12 March 2025 with 354 total hostages being rescued according to Pakistan's military. Pakistani officials accused the BLA of using women and children as human shields, which the insurgent group denied.

The rescue was performed mainly by Zarrar Company, an elite unit of the Army’s Special Services Group (SSG). According to Junior Interior Minister Talal Chaudhry, the Pakistan military sent in hundreds of troops and also deployed the airforce and special forces. The special forces first killed the suicide bombers and then troops went from carriage to carriage to kill the rest of the militants.

Prime Minister Shehbaz Sharif and his ministers visited Balochistan in response to review the situation and express solidarity with its victims. According to a witness, he and other hostages did not have any food and had to drink water from the train's restroom; the Pakistani army provided the rescued hostages food and water.

== Victims ==
Officials confirmed that all 33 militants were killed. Lieutenant General Ahmed Sharif Chaudhry, the director general for the military's media wing Inter-Services Public Relations (ISPR), said five civilians, three railway employees and eighteen security personnel who were passengers of the train were killed, plus three FC personnel killed at the picket, one FC soldier killed on Wednesday morning, and another stationed for security duty on the train. Among the victims were at least three minors. Officials said they fear the death toll could rise due to the significant number of injuries. Initially it was reported that the train driver, Amjad Yasin, was killed, but he was later confirmed to have only been injured. He was shot in the back when militants opened fire on the train. Yasin was reported to have been a train driver for 24 years and previously survived a train explosion incident from about 8 years ago. Pakistani human rights activist Mama Qadeer claimed that over 200 security personnel were killed during the attack. At least 17 passengers and three security personnel were injured. A later report suggested that a total of 37 hostages were injured in the attack.

== Aftermath ==
Following the hijack, Pakistan Railways increased security patrols in all railway stations across the country, restricted passenger access to trains through strict examinations, and subjected transport vehicles to more rigorous inspections. It further recognised the understaffed railway police force and implemented a plan to hire more personnel in subsequent months. Railway Minister Hanif Abbasi pledged to give compensations of 5.2 million Pakistani rupees for each family of individuals who were killed in the attack and guaranteed government jobs for their children.

The train suffered severe damage during the attack and an explosion caused damage to both of the train's engines and five coaches. Pakistan Railways Deputy Chief Engineer Rasheed Imtiaz said on the 15 March that it would take them around 12 hours to restore the track. Pakistan Railways engineers worked to repair the train tracks, while the passenger coaches and locomotive have been sent to Lahore for repairment. One senior railway official revealed that three of the nine coaches were derailed by the explosive blasts while the rest were riddled with bullets. According to another, 600 m (2,000 ft) of rails were damaged by the explosions and derailment. On 18 March, Lieutenant General Ahmed Sharif Chaudhry revealed that Jaffar Express was expected to be able to resume its operations and that surveillance drones and closed-circuit television cameras were to be utilised to monitor train operations, railway stations, and other critical areas for security. On 27 March, the Jaffar Express resumed operations and was decorated with the Pakistan national flag, balloons, and crêpe paper to celebrate its return to service. According to Amir Muqam, the minister managing the Ministry of Kashmir Affairs and Gilgit-Baltistan, 300 passengers were on board for the first trip. He also said that the train's resumed operations were meant to display that Pakistan was not intimidated. Officials later confirmed that the Jaffar Express left with more than 400 people on board with heavy security arrangements made to protect them and staff members.

On 15th September 2025, the alleged mastermind of the attack, Rahman Gul (Note: also known as Ustad Mureed, served in second-in-command of the BLA's Majeed Brigade until his death), the second-in-command of the BLA's suicide squadron, the Majeed Brigade, was assassinated by unknown gunmen in the Sangin district of Helmand Province, Afghanistan

== Responsibility ==
The BLA claimed responsibility for the attack. BLA spokesperson Jeeyand Baloch released a statement claiming that more than 50 personnel from law enforcement agencies, including Pakistan Army soldiers who were reportedly going home on leave, were killed along with 214 hostages. Four suspected facilitators behind the attack were confirmed to have been arrested by the Counter Terrorism Department.

On 14 March 2025, Lieutenant General Ahmed Sharif Chaudhry claimed that the BLA insurgents were aided by "handlers in Afghanistan" and a mastermind in India. He said that the BLA militants were facilitated under the directions of cooperators and a lead mastermind, who contacted them from Afghanistan via a satellite phone. The Ministry of Foreign Affairs of Pakistan reiterated his claim that facilitators from Afghanistan helped to organise the attack and also blamed India for being behind the attack. Chief Minister of Balochistan Sarfraz Bugti said that he had "solid evidence" regarding India's involvement but chose not to share any specifics. Railway Minister Hanif Abbasi accused India of attempting to destabilise Pakistan, especially due to the China-Pakistan Economic Corridor. In response, India's Ministry of External Affairs spokesperson Randhir Jaiswal dismissed the accusations made by Pakistan, stating that India "strongly rejects the baseless allegations." He remarked that "the whole world knows where the epicenter of global terrorism lies." On 18 March, Munir Akram, the Permanent Representative of Pakistan to the United Nations, spoke to the United Nations Security Council, explaining that Afghanistan had not done enough to counter terrorist groups and that the train hijacking among other terrorist incidents were done to destabilise Pakistan.

== Reactions ==
=== Domestic ===
Pakistan's leaders voiced strong opposition towards the hijack of the Jaffar Express, with President Asif Ali Zardari praising his country's security forces for rescuing the passengers from the BLA. Prime Minister Shehbaz Sharif expressed hope that the security forces could eliminate the "coward terrorists", whom he considered enemies of Balochistan's progress. In a post on X, Sharif said that he spoke to Balochistan Chief Minister Sarfraz Bugti regarding the hijacking, and condemned the incident as "cowardly acts" that did not subvert his nation's goals for "resolve for peace" in a speech the day after the attack. He also expressed condolences for the "families of the martyrs", wished survivors swift recoveries, and stated that the insurgents "have been sent to hell". Multiple other prominent Pakistani politicians, namely Interior Minister Mohsin Naqvi, Sindh Home Minister Zia Ul Hassan Lanjar, Senate Chairman Yusuf Raza Gilani, and the National Assembly Speaker Sardar Ayaz Sadiq, also condemned the attack directly. Railway Minister Hanif Abbasi argued that the BLA's train attack was coordinated and part of a foreign conspiracy. He confirmed the rescue of all passengers from the attack but declined to give further details about the process other than that a rescue train had arrived to assist them. He later praised Pakistan's armed forces for their rapid rescue operation, in particular its commandos for preventing suicide bombers from detonating their explosives. Pakistan Army lieutenant general Ahmed Sharif Chaudhry condemned harm towards civilians and stated that whoever was responsible for the incident will be hunted down and brought to justice. He added that the attack "changes the rules of the game".

Punjab governor Sardar Saleem Haider Khan also condemned the attack, considering the insurgents to be inhuman for targeting civilians and wishing for the speedy recovery of injured victims. Pakistan Tehreek-e-Insaf (PTI) party leader Asad Qaiser voiced concern over the attack but also claimed that Balochistan's flawed government policies allowed for it to occur. Pakistan People's Party leader and digital media head Umar Rehman Malik strongly condemned the attack emphasising that such cowardly acts will never break Pakistan's spirit or weaken the nation's unwavering resolve against terrorism. Malik gave his condolences to the victims and their families and commended the efforts and swift response of the security forces. In a statement, Malik said "Our prayers are with the victims and their families, and we hope for the safe rescue of all hostages and the swift recovery of the injured. The perpetrators of this heinous attack must be brought to justice. Pakistan will never bow to terror, Inshallah." The party's chairman Bilawal Bhutto Zardari called for revisiting the National Action Plan to better counter terrorism, criticising the prime minister for not yet having done so. On X, the Human Rights Commission of Pakistan said it was "gravely concerned" by the attack and advocated for "urgent rights-based, pro-people consensus on the issues faced by citizens in Balochistan and to find a peaceful, political solution". Following the conflict, the BLA rejected the Pakistani military's claim to the hijack conflict having ended, arguing that battles were still continuing and that Pakistani forces were suffering heavy casualties; they claimed that they executed 214 hostages but did not provide evidence for such.

On 13 March 2025, governmental parties threw accusations at each other during a National Assembly conference. Khawaja Asif, the Minister of Defence and a member of the Pakistan Muslim League (N) party, disapproved of PTI for discrediting the military's operation against the BLA. Asad Qaiser of PTI responded by blaming the conflict on the failures of intelligence agencies and Sharif's regime. The involved parties unanimously passed a resolution condemning the hijacking incident of the Jaffar Express and commending the Pakistani military and law enforcement agencies for their actions. Multiple Pakistani universities held rallies to condemn the train attack directly, namely Karachi University, Shaheed Mohtarma Benazir Bhutto Medical University, University of Sindh, Sindh Madressatul Islam University, and Sukkur IBA University.

On 17 March, Pakistan's Federal Investigation Agency arrested social media user and alleged pro-PTI activist Haider Saeed for hate speech against the government, an FIA spokesperson stating that he "shared negative propaganda and derogatory content against institutions during the Jaffar Express tragedy". The Punjab Information Minister Azma Bukhari accused PTI of running an "anti-state campaign" that created "political divides".

==== 2025 Balochistan protests ====
Beginning on 20 March 2025, families had attempted to gather around the Quetta Civil Hospital, hoping to identify the 23 bodies from the train hijack that were brought there. Police forces began attacking the gatherers using batons to try to disperse them, injuring several women in the process. Further outrage from the civilians were sparked upon reports that 13 of the bodies were quickly buried at the Kasi graveyard by police forces, some of whom wanted to identify them. The public protests led to authorities allowing some families in the hospital and returning 5 bodies to their relatives. The protests continued to the 21 March when police forces were overwhelmed by protesters, some of whom broke into the civil hospital and stole the bodies; the hospital officials claimed that they were linked to the Baloch Yakjehti Committee (BYC), which was confirmed true by its activists. Authorities stated that the bodies at the civil hospital's morgue were of unidentified terrorists. Authorities confirmed that subsequent calls for protests were fuelled by the conflict between protesters and police in response to the militants' bodies.

On 22 March, the Quetta protests were cracked down upon by police. The Baloch Yakjehti Committee accused police forces of using excessive force against the protesters by firing at them, killing three of them and injuring dozens of others, including seven who were critically injured. Balochistan's government spokesman Shahid Rind claimed that the protesters provoked police using stone-throwing and other methods of violence. BYC chief and Baloch human rights activist Mahrang Baloch led the protests and vowed a sit-in at Sariab Road. Protesters proceeded to launch a sit-in at Sariab Road near the University of Balochistan, where police used tear gas, water cannons, and blank rounds to disperse them. The Bolan Medical College Hospital and Quetta Civil Hospital confirmed several deaths and injuries from the protest suppression. Mahrang Baloch claimed that the protests were fuelled by the arrests of the BYC leader Bebarg Baloch and several members of his extended family and that three people were killed in the protests while thirteen others were injured. The Balochistan government's spokesman argued that protesters pelted police with stones, injuring ten of them in the process. The BYC continued to call for strikes for the next day.

Mahrang Baloch condemned the protest suppression on X, stating that police indiscriminately fired on the peaceful protesters. She along with associate members of the BYC were arrested while the former was participating at a sit-in to protest against humans rights abuses against the Baloch community. The BYC shared a post from Mahrang Baloch that called for Balochistan's state shutdown in response to police violence. It posted photos and videos of various towns and cities from Balochistan participating in the shutdown by closing shops and roads and protests where participants reportedly burned tires to block the roads. Mobiles services were reported to have also been shut down.

=== International ===
- Afghanistan: In response to accusations that Afghanistan was involved in the hijacking, Abdul Qahar Balkhi, a spokesperson for the Ministry of Foreign Affairs, responded on X by rejecting the "baseless accusations" and urged Pakistani authorities to focus on their own security and internal issues instead of making "such irresponsible remarks".
  - National Resistance Front (NRF): Ali Nazary, Head of Foreign Relations for the NRF, strongly condemned the attack and expressed heartfelt condolences to the people of Pakistan and the families of the victims. He also held the Taliban responsible for harbouring militants, accusing them of contributing to the growing instability in the region.
- Belarus: Belarusian president Alexander Lukashenko made direct statements condemning the attack and offering condolences for its victims.
- China: Chinese Foreign Ministry spokeswoman Mao Ning strongly condemned the terrorist attack and reaffirmed China’s stance against all forms of terrorism. She stated that China firmly supports Pakistan in its fight against terrorism, in maintaining national unity and stability, and in protecting its citizens.
- EU: EU Ambassador to Pakistan, Riina Kionka, strongly condemned the terrorist attack in Balochistan on March 11. She expressed sympathy with the Pakistani people and the affected families, voiced deep concern for the hostages, and called for their immediate release.
- Germany: German Ambassador to Pakistan, Alfred Grannas, firmly denounced the attack and expressed solidarity with the victims. He stressed that "violence for political purposes is unacceptable, particularly when innocent civilians are targeted".
- India: Indian Ministry of External Affairs spokesperson Randhir Jaiswal rejected Pakistan's allegations of its involvement in the attack, urging it to "look inwards instead of pointing fingers and shifting the blame for its internal problems and failures on to others".
- Iran: Iranian Foreign Ministry spokesperson Ismail Baghaei expressed deep concern over the threat posed to innocent civilians. He reiterated Iran’s firm opposition to all forms of terrorism and violent extremism, expressed solidarity with Pakistan’s government and people, and offered assistance to help end the terror act and ensure safety.
- Norway: A spokesperson from the Norwegian Embassy stated that Norway strongly condemned the deadly attack. The spokesperson highlighted the tragic loss of innocent lives, including women and children, and extended deep sympathies and condolences to the victims and their families.
- Russia: The Russian Embassy in Islamabad condemned the terrorist incident and emphasised the urgent need for the safe release of all hostages. The embassy denounced the use of passengers as human shields, labelling such tactics as unacceptable. Russian president Vladimir Putin also condemned the attack and offered condolences to the victims of the attack.
- UK: British Foreign Secretary, David Lammy, condemned the terrorist attack in Balochistan through a statement on social media. He expressed condolences and stated that the UK’s thoughts are with the families who lost loved ones in the incident.
- UN: UN Secretary-General Antonio Guterres strongly condemned the hijacking of the train in Balochistan province. He expressed concern for the hostages and called for their immediate release. His spokesman, Stephane Dujarric, issued a statement emphasising the Secretary-General’s deep condemnation of the incident.
- United States: The US government denounced the attack and hostages taking by militants of the outlawed Balochistan Liberation Army. It expressed sympathies to the victims and their families and labelled the Baloch Liberation Army as a terror group.

The Organisation of Islamic Cooperation (OIC) also condemned the attack.

== See also ==
- August 2024 Balochistan attacks
- 2024 Quetta railway station bombing
