= Aslam Baloch =

Baloch militant (1975–2018)

- Born: Takari Mohammad Aslam; 1975; Quetta, Balochistan, Pakistan
- Died: 25 December 2018 (aged 42–43); Ayno Maina, Kandahar, Afghanistan
- Cause of death: Targeted suicide bombing
- Other names: Achu, Achoo, Achou
- Children: Rehan Baloch
- Military career
- Allegiance: Balochistan Liberation Army (BLA)
- Service years: 1995 – 2018

Aslam Baloch (1975–25 December 2018), also known as Aslam Achu (alternatively spelled Achoo and Achou), was a Baloch soldier. He was the founder of BLA-Achu, a splinter faction of the Balochistan Liberation Army, which is involved in the Baloch Independence Movement. He was the architect of BLA's Majeed Brigade, a suicide squad responsible for several high-profile attacks in Pakistan. Baloch was killed in a targeted suicide bombing in Ayno Maina, Kandahar, Afghanistan on 25 December 2018.

== Early life and education ==
Aslam Baloch, born Takari Mohammad Aslam in 1975 in Quetta, Balochistan, Pakistan, to Raheem Dad, a member of the Dehwar clan. He received his early education at the Special High School in Quetta.

During his teenage years in the early 1990s, Aslam became engaged in Baloch nationalist circles. He was influenced by Baloch separatist leader Khair Bakhsh Marri and participated in Marri's "Haq Tawar" study sessions following the latter's return from exile in 1994. By the mid-1990s, he aligned himself with the Baloch Independence Movement.

== Balochistan Liberation Army ==
In the mid-1990s, he was among the young soldiers who helped revive the Balochistan Liberation Army (BLA) which had been dormant since the 1970s. By 1995, he played a role in reorganising and strengthening the BLA's underground network across Balochistan.

By 2000, when the BLA formally resurfaced to begin a new phase of insurgency, Aslam Baloch was at the forefront. He reportedly commanded the BLA's first and largest guerrilla camp in the Bolan area of Balochistan.

By the mid-2000s, as Pakistan's military crackdown in Balochistan intensified (especially after the 2006 killing of Nawab Akbar Bugti), Aslam remained active in the guerilla campaign. In 2006, facing heavy pressure, he led BLA cadres across the border to seek refuge, part of a trend that saw Baloch soldiers using sanctuaries in Afghanistan.

By the early 2010s, Aslam emerged as a key commander within the BLA, becoming the operational chief of its hardline faction. During this period, internal divisions surfaced between exiled tribal leaders and younger field commanders. Aslam "Achu", as he was known, along with fellow commander Bashir Zaib, broke away from the BLA's nominal leader in exile, Hyrbyair Marri, to form a separate faction, BLA-Achu, that operated on the ground. Under his leadership, the organization became more publicly visible.

He was responsible for establishing an elite unit within the BLA, the Majeed Brigade which was formed in 2010 to conduct suicide attacks on high-value targets. As the head of this unit, Aslam oversaw its operations until his death in 2018.

Under his command, the BLA carried out coordinated operations in both Balochistan and Pakistan's major cities. On 11 August 2018, his son, Rehan Baloch, carried out the unit's first known suicide bombing by attacking a bus carrying engineers near Dalbandin in Balochistan. The explosion injured several Chinese nationals and resulted in the death of his son. By late 2018, he was often referred to by the honorary title "General" within militant circles and was also known as "Ustad" (teacher) for his role in training younger fighters.

He faced numerous criminal cases in Pakistan, including charges related to bombings and targeted killings, and the provincial government had placed a bounty of Rs. 5 million on him. Despite several close encounters, including a serious injury during a Pakistani forces operation in Balochistan's Bolan area in 2017, he managed to evade capture by moving between safe havens. His two decades of involvement in militant operations greatly influenced the tactics and strategies employed by the BLA.

Aslam accused Pakistan of oppressing the Baloch people and plundering Balochistan's abundant natural resources, such as gas and minerals. In a 2018 video interview given to an Indian news agency, Aslam Baloch alleged that Pakistan and its ally China had conceived "a malicious plan to eliminate Baloch identity" through economic projects and military oppression. He specifically denounced the China-Pakistan Economic Corridor (CPEC) as a vehicle for colonization of Balochistan, and warned that Baloch fighters would resist foreign investments that did not benefit the local people.

While leading BLA-Achu faction, he embraced tactics like suicide bombings that even other Baloch groups had shunned. Aslam framed these extreme measures as necessary in what he saw as a war for Baloch survival and remained opposed to any reconciliation with the Pakistani state. Until his last days, he vowed to continue armed struggle, threatening more "fidayeen" (sacrificial) attacks against Pakistani forces and Chinese nationals to further the Baloch cause. He influenced a number of Baloch youth to join the insurgency in Balochistan. He favored a "middle-class" leadership for the BLA and believed in distributing power based on ability rather than tribal entitlement.

== Death ==
Aslam Baloch was killed on 25 December 2018 in a targeted suicide bombing in Ayno Maina, Kandahar, Afghanistan. The attack took place when Aslam and other senior members of the BLA had reportedly gathered for a strategic meeting. A suicide bomber detonated explosives near the residence, fatally injuring Aslam. Despite being rushed to a hospital, he succumbed to his injuries shortly thereafter. The blast also claimed the lives of five other BLA members, including two commanders—Taj Muhammad "Tajo" Marri and Karim Marri, also known as Rahim Baloch—as well as several security personnel. The BLA's spokesperson, Jeeyand Baloch, later confirmed Aslam's death in a statement from an undisclosed location, describing him and his associates as martyrs of the Baloch nationalist cause. The ISI was reported to have widely been involved in the killing of Aslam Baloch on the orders from then DG ISI Asim Munir.
