= January–February 2026 Balochistan attacks =

Militant attacks in Balochistan, Pakistan

- Part of the insurgency in Balochistan
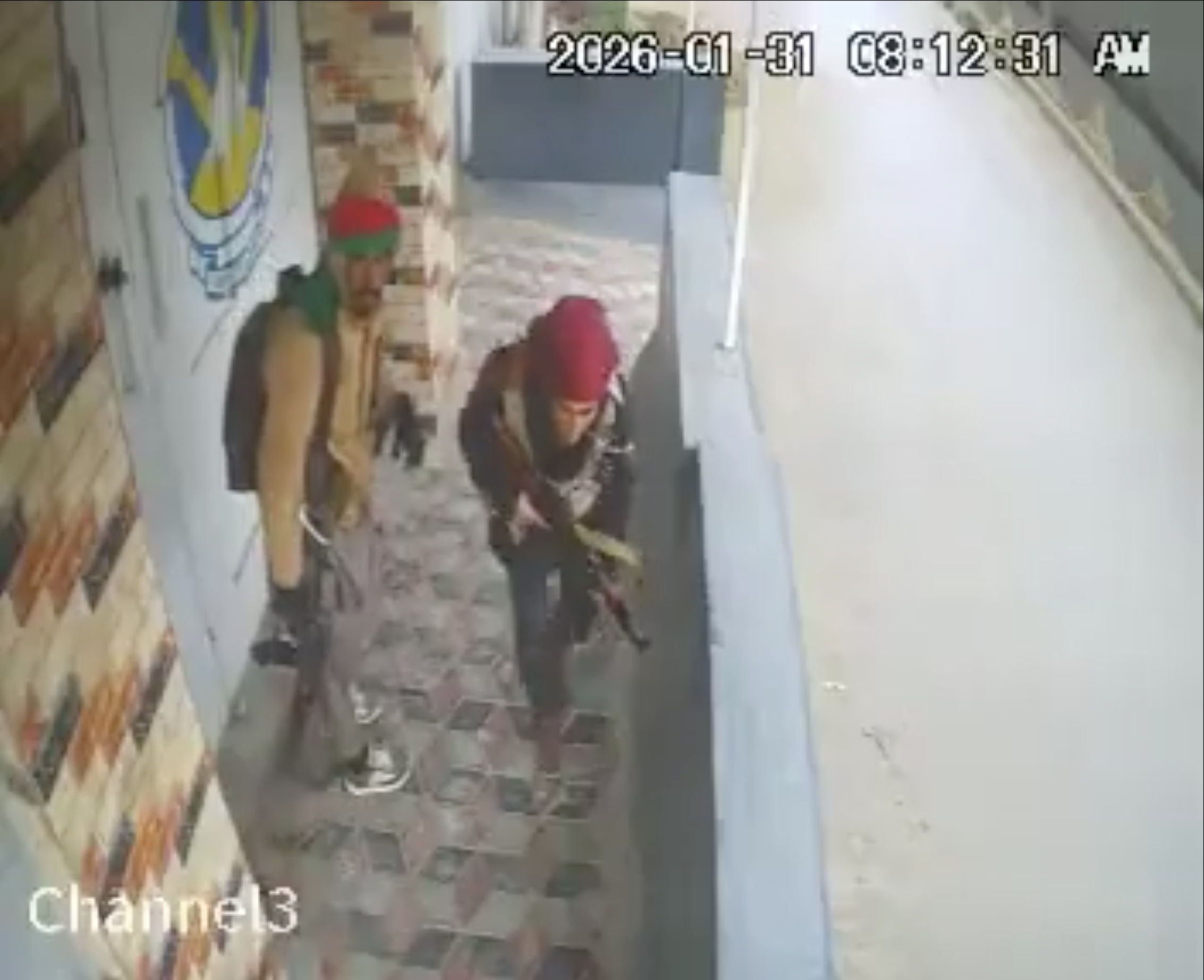
- Two BLA militants outside a children's school near Akram Market, Quetta, c. 31 January
Date	30 January – 5 February 2026
Location	Balochistan, Pakistan
Result	See aftermath
Territorial changes	Baloch militants temporarily occupy limited and small parts of Nushki for 3 days before being pushed out

Belligerents
Balochistan Liberation Army; Balochistan Liberation Front	Pakistan

Commanders and leaders
Bashir Zaib; Allah Nazar Baloch	Asif Ali Zardari; Shehbaz Sharif; Sarfraz Bugti; Khawaja Asif; Asim Munir

Units involved
Majeed Brigade; Fidayeen Squad; Fateh Squad; Special Tactical Operations Squad (STOS); Sedu Battalion	Pakistan Armed Forces; Pakistan Army; Pakistan Navy; Maritime Security Agency; Civil Armed Forces; Frontier Corps; FCB-N; FCB-S; Coast Guards; Federal Constabulary; Pakistan Police Service; Balochistan Police; CTD (Balochistan); Pakistani intelligence community

Strength
200–300	Unknown

Casualties and losses
Per Pakistani government: 216 militants killed BLA claim: 93 fighters killed	22 security personnel killed
- 36 civilians killed 100 suspects arrested by law enforcement

In late January and early February 2026, in a series of coordinated attacks across multiple districts in Balochistan, Baloch insurgents engaged in armed assaults and suicide bombings targeting schools, hospitals, banks, markets, security installations, police stations, a high-security prison, and various civilian areas. These attacks occurred as part of an ongoing insurgency in the Balochistan region, where nationalist and separatist groups are seeking greater autonomy or independence from Pakistan and Iran.

Pakistani security forces responded with large-scale counter-operations across the province, stating that the operations resulted in the deaths of at least 216 militants and 22 security personnel. Around 36 civilians were also killed in the attacks carried out by the BLA militants. The attacks were widely condemned by China, France, Turkey, the U.S. Embassy, and the United Nations Security Council. The attacks were also described as among the deadliest incidents in Balochistan in recent years.

== Background ==
=== 1940s–2019 ===
Balochistan has been the site of a protracted insurgency since the late 1940s, with Baloch groups accusing the Pakistani government of exploiting the province's natural resources while marginalising local populations. The Balochistan Liberation Army (BLA), designated as a terrorist organisation by Pakistan, the United States, and the European Union (EU), has conducted numerous attacks on security forces and infrastructure projects—including those linked to the China–Pakistan Economic Corridor (CPEC).

=== 2019 onward escalation ===
Prior to the attacks, the insurgency had escalated since late 2019.

Before the attacks, from 25 to 29 January 2026, Pakistani intelligence-based operations in Panjgur and Harnai had killed 41 militants and insurgents of the Balochistan Liberation Army (BLA) and Pakistani Taliban (TTP) respectively. During the operation against BLA insurgents in Panjgur on 25 January, 3 local BLA commanders, going by the names; Farooq (alias "Soro"), Adeel, and Waseem, were killed and weapons, ammunition and explosives were also recovered by the Army from the militants, as well as cash which was looted from bank during a bank robbery in Panjgur from 15 December 2025.

According to the Pakistan Institute for Peace Studies, the province of Balochistan saw at least 254 terrorist attacks in 2025, which was 26% higher than the previous year, resulting in more than 400 deaths.

According to the provincial Chief Minister of Balochistan, Sarfraz Bugti (via a post on X), at least 700 insurgents were killed by security forces during counterinsurgency and counter-terrorism operations in the province of Balochistan in the year 2025 alone.

The year 2025 was deadliest year for Pakistan, especially for militants and insurgents, with 2,115 militants and insurgents killed overall throughout the country, along with 664 security personnel and 580 civilians, according to a report released by Pakistan Institute for Conflict and Security Studies.

== Attacks ==
The militant attacks of 30 January 2026, began around 03:00 PKT and spanned at least nine districts, including Quetta, Gwadar, Mastung, Nushki, Pasni, and Kharan. According to Pakistani security officials, the attacks instead began at 04:00 a.m. on Saturday with suicide blasts in Nushki and Pasni. Witnesses stated that the attacked started around 5 a.m. local time. According to provincial Health Minister, Bakht Muhammad Kakar, most of the attacks had begun almost simultaneously across Balochistan.

At least a dozen towns and cities in Balochistan reported attacks being carried out. During the attacks, BLA militants and insurgents stormed banks, schools, markets, and security installations across Balochistan. The attacks were described as one of the largest and most wide-scale attacks ever done by the BLA.

Militants used guns, grenades, and suicide vests to target police stations, paramilitary outposts, a high-security prison in Quetta, and civilian vehicles. American-made weapons were also reportedly used by militants. In Quetta, militants stormed multiple police facilities, leading to prolonged gun battles. According to eyewitnesses, militants and insurgents riding on motorcycles were armed with grenades and assault rifles during the attacks. According to local authorities, armed men had briefly blocked roads in some parts of Quetta, and an explosion was heard near a high-security area.

Suicide bombings were reported in Mastung, Gwadar, Kharan, and Nushki. In Gwadar and Kharan, civilians were among those killed during the clashes. In Mastung, Kalat, and Pasni, militants attempted to strike government buildings and security installations. In Mastung, Kalat and Pasni, government buildings and security installations were targeted by militants and insurgents.

Pakistani security forces engaged in a three-day battle to retake Nushki—a town of about 50,000 inhabitants—from BLA forces, with local police stating that Pakistani personnel employed drones and helicopters to recover the town. During the attacks, Baloch militants targeted civilians, a prison, police stations, and paramilitary bases throughout Balochistan. The BLA seized six administrative offices during the battle of Nushki. Insurgents targeted multiple buildings and installations belonging to both the provincial and federal governments in Nushki, including the police lines/station, a judicial complex, the deputy commissioner’s office, and a camp of the Federal Constabulary. According to police officials, the insurgents were at one point within 1 km (3,300 ft) of the provincial chief minister's office in Quetta before being repelled. Multiple buildings were also set ablaze during battle of Nushki. In the Nushki district, militants attempted to storm the provincial headquarters of the Frontier Corps, but the attack was repelled, according to the Balochistan Police. According to the Balochistan Constabulary, the desert town of Nushki was secured by local law enforcement after a three-day battle during which 7 police officers were killed. According to security officials, helicopters and drones were used against militants in the city of Nushki to help drive out BLA-affiliated militants and insurgents.

The BLA labelled the attacks "Operation Herof 2.0" (with the word Herof meaning "Black Storm" in Balochi), as a follow up to the August 2024 Balochistan attacks (which it labels "Operation Herof"), and described the operations as simultaneous strikes on military and administrative targets, with videos released by the group also showing female fighters participating in the attacks. By 1 February, Pakistani officials reported that security forces had thwarted most attempts, engaging in clearance operations that lasted into the following day and went on till 5 February.

According to officials, the Baloch Liberation Army (BLA) made announcements through mosques ahead of the attacks, asking people to join and support them, claiming to be waging a war to take over all government buildings and installations in the province.

According to Pakistani security forces, foreign handlers of the Baloch militants and insurgents, including their operatives, were present at the sites of the attacks and helped to coordinate them.

=== Affected areas ===
According to Pakistani security officials and the Pakistan Army, multiple attacks were attempted and carried out in Quetta, Nushki, Dalbandin, Kalat, Gwadar, Pasni, Tump, and Mastung, stating that clearance operations were continuing in areas affected by the attacks. According to Shahid Rind, most of the attacks by the BLA were foiled.

The Baloch Liberation Army later subsequently released the Nushki Deputy Commissioner, Muhammad Hussain Hazara and Assistant commissioner, Maria Shamaoon, who had been taken hostage earlier. According to the Nushki Assistant Commissioner, Maria Shamoon, "On January 31, at around 5:30 in the morning, some miscreants snuck into our homes and took over the property". She also added that the militants took over the government complex and had taken the deputy commissioner, Hussain Hazara, hostage as well. Additional troops were deployed to Nushki, after a three-day-long battle with militants to recapture the town, in order to reinforce it, according to security officials.

In Pasni, an attack was done on the Pakistan Coast Guards facility, during which a suicide bomber rammed an explosive-laden vehicle into the gate of a Maritime Security Agency camp next to the PGC facility and 4 militants (including a female attacker) stormed into the camp before being pinned down in a building near the gate, while another militant (their commander) stayed outside and provided cover fire. During the subsequent shootout and standoff between the MSA and PCG on one side and the pinned-down insurgents on the other, all 5 of the remaining militants were killed. 1 MSA soldier was killed, and another was injured over the course of the attack. In total, 7 BLA insurgents/militants were killed in and around the town of Pasni. According to the Balochistan police, militants also tried to abduct passengers in Pasni who were travelling on buses along highways.

Out of all cities and towns in Balochistan, the provincial capital of Quetta emerged as by far the most targeted and affected by them. Activities by armed gunmen, who were primarily insurgents/militants affiliated with the BLA, were reported in multiple parts of the city, targeting police stations and security checkpoints, including a Police Training Centre in Quetta, as well as several vulnerable locations in the red zone well targeted during the attacks. In Quetta's red zone, police personnel including a deputy superintendent were killed. On Quetta’s Saryab Road, armed gunmen opened fire on a moving police van. The policemen retaliated with gunfire, and paramilitary Frontier Corpsmen also joined the gunfight later on. Four of the attacking insurgents were killed during the exchange of gunshots, and the area was soon secured by security forces. According to the Provincial Health Minister Of Balochistan, Bakht Muhammad Kakar, two police officers were killed in a grenade attack on a police vehicle in Quetta. According to witnesses in Quetta, three police stations set on fire by the attackers, who wreaked havoc throughout the city before security forces arrived on the scene to stop them and a military helicopter was seen firing shells at the insurgents and militants. A bank was set ablaze and several police vehicles were torched, which caused widespread panic among the local populace.

In Kharan, Shahid Malazai, a tribal and political leader, along with 6 of his bodyguards, were killed when gunmen stormed Malazai's residence. The 3 insurgents who were responsible for Malazai's killing were killed during another exchange of fire in Kharan later on.

A labourers’ colony in Gwadar was also attacked by insurgents, resulting in the deaths of five members of a labour family who were from Khuzdar. Militants attacked a camp in which migrant workers were residing, killing 11 people, according to Atta-ur-Rehman, a senior police officer in Gwadar. Those killed included 5 men, 3 women and 3 children. According to the Balochistan Constabulary, militants also tried to abduct passengers in Gwadar who were travelling along highways on buses. 2 female militants were also killed during the attacks in Gwader

In Mastung, gunfire and explosions injured several people, including a police officer, while an attack on a prison in Mastung was repelled. It was, however, after at least 30 prisoners had already escaped from it.

In Kalat, clashes reportedly took place near the District Collector headquarters and police stations. Also in Kalat, attacks by militants and insurgents on police stations and banks injured 3 policemen and forced local shops to shut due to fear and uncertainty over the situation.

In Nasirabad, security forces defused explosive material planted on a railway track.

In Khuzdar, residents claimed to have witnessed BLA militants capturing seven members of the security forces. Later in February, the group released footage claiming to have captured seven Pakistani soldiers with a footage.

=== Involvement of other militant groups ===
The Baloch Liberation Front claimed to have participated in the attacks alongside the Baloch Liberation Army.

According to Pakistani security forces, foreign handlers of the Baloch militants and insurgents, including their operatives, were in direct communication with them during the attacks, with some being present at the sites of the attacks and where they had helped to coordinate them.

== Response ==
In response to the attacks, Pakistan's Defence Minister, Khawaja Asif, urged a surge in the deployment of troops to Balochistan in order to combat the attacks and deteriorating security situation.

=== Military operation ===
On 29 January an operation, code named "Operation Radd-ul-Fitna 1", was launched in response to the BLA's "Operation Herof 2.0" and was conducted on the basis of intelligence, with the involvement of, and coordination from, the Pakistan Armed Forces (PAF), Pakistani law enforcement, and various Pakistani intelligence agencies were working jointly with precision and were planning together, according to an official statement. The operation had ended by 5 February and had resulted in the deaths of 216 militants and insurgents, according to the Armed Forces' media wing, the ISPR.

During the operation, security forces had launched fresh raids in the districts of Panjgur and Harnai targeting hideouts/camps of the BLA in Balochistan.

According to the ISPR, because of the coordinated engagements and clearance operations, 216 militants were killed, and the BLA's leadership, command-and-control structures, and operational capabilities were significantly weakened as a result. Operations began on January 29 in Panjgur and the outskirts of Harnai district after an imminent threat was indicated by verified intelligence. In this initial phase, 41 militants linked to local insurgent networks were eliminated. Subsequent responses by security forces had thwarted further attacks by BLA, followed by expanded intelligence-based operations across multiple areas to dismantle sleeper cells through sustained clearance and sanitisation operations. During the operation, a large cache of foreign-origin weapons, ammunition, explosives, and equipment was recovered, with preliminary analysis indicating systematic external facilitation and logistical support.

The military stated that it was committed to counter terrorism under the National Action Plan (NAP) and vowed that operations would continue until all threats are eliminated. ISPR described the operation as reflecting Balochistan’s preference (and of Pakistan’s as a whole) for peace, unity, and development over violence.

According to the Inter-Services Public Relations, Operation Radd-ul-Fitna-1 had concluded by 5 February, after a several-day-long, intelligence-driven campaign launched in response to BLA's wave of attacks across Balochistan.

According to Shahid Rind, the official spokesperson of Balochistan chief minister, Sarfaraz Bugti, illegal small arms, recoilless rifles, anti-aircraft guns and rocket-propelled grenade launchers were also found in some homes during the operations. He also stated that at least 100 suspects believed to have been involved in the attacks were arrested by security forces.

A group of about 25 militants and criminals, led by a man by the name of Mirak Khan Chakrani, had surrendered to local authorities after the conclusion of operation Radd ul Fitna-1, during which they also handed over a large quantity of weapons and ammunition to authorities. The group had been involved in militancy, looting, as well as robbery and extortion. The group had surrendered after efforts by security forces and Mir Aftab Bugti, the brother of Balochistan's Chief Minister. Mirak Khan Chakrani also announced his joining of the Chakrani Peace Force in order to support efforts against extremist elements.

=== Measures by the government ===
Section 144 was imposed across Balochistan for one month, citing the overall "law-and-order situation". Authorities banned vehicles with tinted windows and prohibited gatherings of 5 or more people, including political or religious processions, without approval from the relevant district administration. A notification warned that violators would face legal action under Section 188, including imprisonment of up to 6 months. Due to the attacks and fragile security situation, mobile data services were suspended for some time in Quetta and internet services in general were temporarily shut in other parts of Balochistan.

The Balochistan health department declared an emergency at all government hospitals across the province to treat those injured in the attacks. Balochistan’s health minister, Bakht Muhammad Kakar, instructed health officials and hospitals to ensure immediate medical care for those injured. Health facilities in Quetta were placed on high alert, and additional doctors were deployed in order to treat the victims of the attacks.

== Aftermath ==
According to Shahid Rind, a spokesman of Balochistan's provincial government, most of the attacks by the Baloch Liberation Army had been repelled or foiled.

=== Restoration of the situation ===
According to Shahid Rind, the official spokesperson of Balochistan chief minister, Sarfaraz Bugti, by 5 February, most areas in Balochistan where attacks had occurred had been cleared, except for Quetta, where search and combing operations were still ongoing. He said to reporters during a press conference in Quetta that "The situation across the province is normal, including in Nushki and Quetta". He also stated that at least 100 suspects, who were arrested during the combing and search operations in Quetta, were also being investigated. He further stated that "The identification of terrorists killed in the operations is ongoing".

Shahid Rind also said that the exams of 8th and 9th-grade students in Quetta will continue as usual, adding that the polio vaccination campaign will also resume its operations in Balochistan, except for Nushki. Rind stated all highways in Balochistan were open for vehicles, except for a small part of a road in Nushki, which was damaged by explosions during the battle for the town. He added that local authorities are busy repairing the road, and it will become open for traffic after a period of 12 to 24 hours.

==== Internet services ====
Due to the attacks and fragile security situation, mobile data services were suspended for some time in Quetta and internet services in general were temporarily shut in other parts of Balochistan. Internet and mobile data services had continued to be non-operational by early morning of 5 February, despite rail services having been restored.

During a press conference, the spokesperson for the Provincial Government of Balochistan, Shahid Rind, said that Internet services across Quetta were to be restored by the evening of 5 February, except for areas in which search and combing operations were being conducted, where internet services were to be slightly disrupted going into the night.

==== Railways services ====
In Nasirabad, security forces defused explosive material planted on a railway track.

During the attacks, Pakistan Railways suspended train services from Balochistan to all other parts of the country for 4 days, but restored service by 5 February later in the day, after counter-operations by security forces had concluded.

== Casualties ==
Initial reports varied, but by 5 February, official figures confirmed 22 security personnel (including law enforcement and paramilitary forces) as well as 36 civilians killed (including women, children, elders, and labourers), with an unspecified number injured. During the counter-operations, 216 militants were killed, bringing the total death toll to 274.

The BLA claimed to have killed 280 security personnel and taken 18 security personnel prisoner. However, the BLA provided no proof to back their claims. It also initially claimed that 18 of its fighters were killed. It later admitted to losing at least 92 of its fighters during the attacks by 6 February.

Chief Minister of Balochistan, Sarfraz Bugti, stated on 2 February that retaliatory operations launched by security forces, which occurred over the course of 40 hours, resulted in the deaths of at least 145 militants, while also confirming that at least 31 civilians and 17 security personnel lost their lives during the attacks and their reprisals.

According to Pakistani authorities, at least 133 insurgents and militants had been killed across Balochistan over the course of 2 days from 31 January to 1 February, with 92 militants/insurgents killed on 31 January alone (with 16 security personnel and 31 civilians having also been killed). A total of 216 militants/insurgents were reportedly killed overall from 29 January to 2 February. Analysts described it as the single deadliest day for Balochi insurgents in decades, due to the sheer amount of militants/insurgents killed in such a short duration of time.

== Reactions ==
=== Domestic reactions ===
Pakistani officials condemned the attacks as attempts to undermine stability in Balochistan.

- Pakistani President Asif Ali Zardari had commended security forces and law enforcement agencies over the successful completion of the operation in Balochistan, the state-run Radio Pakistan had reported. In a statement (according to the report), the president noted that the timely action of the security forces thwarted the nefarious attempts of "Fitna-al-Hindustan" to disrupt peace in Balochistan: "Eradication of foreign-backed terrorism is our top priority", he said, being quoted by the report; "The president expressed satisfaction that intelligence-based coordinated operations crippled the leadership and capacity of the foreign-backed terrorist networks", it read. It further said that President Zardari paid tribute to the innocent civilians and security personnel who were killed during the operation, and expressed condolences to their families: "The nation salutes the sacrifices of martyrs and stands united against terrorism", he said.
- Pakistani Prime Minister Shehbaz Sharif had also paid tribute to the officers and security forces personnel, as well as the leadership of the Armed Forces for the success of Operation Radd-ul-Fitna-1, Radio Pakistan reported. In his statement, Prime Minister Sharif had praised the capabilities of the security forces for "breaking the backbone of enemies for peace and development" in Balochistan during the operation. He emphasized that "the nation could never forget the sacrifices of its martyrs", Radio Pakistan said. "He vowed that the cowardly and malicious attempts by the terrorists to sabotage the peace of Balochistan through targeting innocent civilians would always be crushed," it had read. "The terrorists have proved that they are enemies of development in the province and its people by targeting innocent civilians," it quoted him as saying. PM Shehbaz vowed that the war against the "scourge of terrorism will continue until it is completely eradicated from the country". "The entire nation stands shoulder to shoulder with the armed forces in their unwavering determination to defend the homeland," he had affirmed.
- Balochistan Chief Minister Sarfaraz Bugti, in a post on X, stated that the operation was a "clear message to those committing acts of bloodshed in Balochistan". He said that the Baloch Liberation Army (BLA) was a "fitna" (an Arabic word for strife of civil conflict) targeting civilians and labourers, saying that the group was working "at the behest of India". Bugti said that Pakistan will not compromise on its unity, development, and the protection of its people. He warned that any attempt to destabilize Pakistan will be met with "a decisive response" and that "The nation stands united, and any hand raised against Pakistan will not only be dealt with law and full force but will be broken". Later, while visiting houses of police officers and personnel killed in the attacks, he also said that government of Balochistan will never leave the families of killed security personnel and that all available resources would be utilized for their welfare. He said the government will provide immediate financial assistance, including government jobs, to the family members of killed policemen. He also announced that the provincial government will bear all expenses related to the education of the children of killed police officers.

=== International reactions ===
International statements included condemnation of the incident and solidarity with Pakistan from China, Turkey, Qatar, France, and the United States. Members of the United Nations Security Council described the attacks as heinous and cowardly, and condemned them in the strongest terms. The UNSC also held BLA responsible for the attacks on civilians and expressed sympathy with the victims of the attack. A total of 48 Pakistani nationals were killed in the attacks, which included 17 security personnel and 31 civilians, according to the UNSC.

== See also ==
- List of terrorist incidents in 2026
  - Terrorist incidents in Pakistan in 2026
- Operation Azm-e-Istehkam
- August 2024 Balochistan attacks
- July 2026 Balochistan attacks
