= 2024 Gwadar attack =

2024 militant attack on Gwadar port

2024 Gwadar suicide attack
- Location: Gwadar, Balochistan, Pakistan
- Date: 20 March 2024 (UTC+05:00)
- Target: Gwadar Port Authority Complex
- Deaths: 10 (including 8 attackers and 2 soldiers)
- Perpetrator: Balochistan Liberation Army
- No. of participants: 8

On 20 March 2024, the Gwadar Port Authority Complex was attacked by armed Baloch separatists. All eight militants as well as two soldiers were killed in the attack.

== The attack ==
In a statement from Inter-Services Public Relations (ISPR), the military's media wing said a group of militants tried to enter the Port Authority Colony. The attackers executed multiple blasts before engaging in a shoutout with the security forces.

Pakistani security forces quickly responded to the gunfire and bomb attacks. In the two-hour-long battle, soldiers killed all eight militants. Two members of the security forces were also killed.

== Claim of responsibility ==
Majeed Brigade, an armed wing of the Balochistan Liberation Army (BLA) which demands the secession of Balochistan province, claimed responsibility for the attack. The group called the attack a warning to foreign investors interested in Gwadar, signalling to China of its investments in Gwadar port.

== See also ==
- Insurgency in Balochistan
- List of terrorist incidents in Pakistan since 2001
