= July 2026 Balochistan attacks =

Militant attacks in Balochistan, Pakistan

- Part of the insurgency in Balochistan and 2026 Afghanistan–Pakistan war
Date	Militants attacks (4–8 July 2026) (4 days)
Location	Balochistan, Pakistan
Result	Pakistan launches Operation Shaban in response to the attacks

Belligerents
Pakistan	Balochistan Liberation Army; Pakistani Taliban

Commanders and leaders
Sarfraz Bugti	(Balochistan Liberation Army) / (Pakistani Taliban) Unknown

Units involved
Government of Pakistan; Pakistan Armed Forces; Pakistan Army; Balochistan; Balochistan Police; Station house officers	Balochistan Liberation Army insurgents Pakistani Taliban militants

Casualties and losses
27 police and 11 soldiers killed (during initial attacks); 50 security personnel killed (during Operation Shaban); Total killed: (Pakistan) 87	35 killed (during initial attacks)(4-8 July); 147 killed (during Operation Shaban)(5-23 July); Total killed: (Balochistan Liberation Army) / (Pakistani Taliban) 150
- 41 civilians killed(4-8 July); 6 civilians injured

From 4 to 8 July 2026, a series of coordinated insurgent assaults by militants targeting Pakistani security forces across multiple districts occurred in the Balochistan province of southwestern Pakistan. The violence, attributed by the Pakistani military to joint attacks by the Pakistani Taliban (TTP) and the Balochistan Liberation Army (BLA), resulted in the deaths of 42 people, 38 security personnel and 4 civilians.

The violence escalated across three separate areas, notably involving an attack on local villagers, a raid on an infrastructure-guarding police checkpoint in the Ziarat District, and a subsequent highway ambush on a military convoy in the Lasbela District.

Following the initial attacks, the Pakistan Armed Forces conducted the multi-district counter-insurgency operation Operation Shaban, resulting in the deaths of 129 militants, as of 16 July 2026.

== Background ==
Balochistan, Pakistan's largest province by land area, has experienced decades of low-level separatist insurgency alongside violence from Islamist militant factions.

The police post involved in the primary Ziarat District assault was tasked with protecting the construction phase of the multi-billion-rupee Mangi Dam water supply project. This infrastructure pipeline is designed to resolve severe, ongoing water shortages in Quetta, the provincial capital.

Before the attacks, The Sino Group Belt and Road Research Institute Monitoring and Evaluation team issued an early warning on 2 July 2026 of a severe surge in militant attacks, based on observed strikes against logistical routes in June.

== Timeline of attacks ==
=== Hanna Urak Valley assault ===
The hostilities commenced on 4 July 2026 in the Hanna Urak Valley area near Quetta. Armed militants targeted Pakistani security personnel and local villagers protesting against militant activity, in the rural valley. According to official statements from provincial authorities, the initial valley assault left four civilians dead and six others wounded.

=== Mangi Dam checkpoint raid ===
On the night of 6 July, militants launched an attack on a remote police checkpoint in the Mangi area of Ziarat District. Clashes erupted, during which nine police officers, including two senior station house officers (SHOs), were killed on site along with the ATF In-charge Head Constable Saifullah.

Security forces confirmed that 15 of the advancing attackers were also killed during the initial exchange of fire. Before military reinforcements arrived at the remote outpost, retreating insurgents abducted 18 surviving police officers, later executing them.

=== Lasbela District convoy ambush ===
On Wednesday, 8 July 2026, a separate front opened in the Bela–Winder region of the Lasbela District. Heavily armed insurgents blocked a highway transit route and ambushed an approaching military vehicle convoy. The ensuing highway gun battle resulted in the deaths of 11 Pakistani soldiers and 14 militants.

== Aftermath and military response ==
Following the initial Ziarat raid, local residents organized demonstrations and blocked traffic along a national highway near the Mangi Dam site to protest security vulnerabilities. The highway protest and sit-in at Ziarat Cross was called off late on 7 July after Balochistan chief minister Sarfraz Bugti negotiated with local residents and families of the slain officers.

On 8 July, the Inter-Services Public Relations (ISPR) director general, Lieutenant General Ahmed Sharif Chaudhry, held a news conference in Rawalpindi. The military confirmed that during a rescue attempt, all 18 of the abducted police officers from the Ziarat facility were executed by their captors. This brought the total police death toll for that specific engagement to 27.

The military command announced that counter-insurgency operations conducted across the province killed a total of 54 militants over the four-day span. The military spokesperson attributed attacks to a shared leadership and logistical campaign involving the separatist BLA and the TTP. Security forces carried out separate counter-insurgency operations across the province, killing six militants in the Kharan District and eight additional militants in the Dalbandin area.

On 9 July, Prime Minister Shehbaz Sharif chaired a meeting of the Provincial Apex Committee on the National Action Plan in Quetta, which was attended by Field Marshal Asim Munir, Balochistan governor Jaffar Khan Mandokhail, and Chief Minister Sarfraz Bugti. During the meeting, Sharif declared that the civil and military leadership had taken a "mutual and singular decision" to collectively eradicate terrorism using all available resources.

On 10 July, Pakistani security forces reported killing a total of 75 militants in Balochistan using air support and helicopter missions. They also repelled another attack on a police station in Khuzdar District. According to a Dawn News report, the Pakistani military launched "Operation Shaban" which has killed at least 67 terrorists.

On 12 July, PTV News reported that the total number of terrorists killed had reached 105, during Operation Shahban and other intelligence-based operations carried out since 5 July in Balochistan.

On 13 July, an additional 8 more militants were killed while the total number of insurgents killed during the operation had reached 79.

On 15 July, 3 more insurgents were killed as the total reported insurgent and militant kill tally of Operation Shaban had reached all the way up to 88.

From 20 to 22 July, Pakistani security forces (including the army, paramilitary forces, and police) had reportedly killed 10 militants and insurgents across Balochistan while also arresting 2 female suicide bombers and their facilitator. 7 were killed in Surab and another 3 killed were in Mastung, while the 3 others arrested were pursued in Mastung. This brought the overall death toll of insurgents and militants killed since 5 July to 139 killed.

=== Total death toll ===
According to data compiled by the Pakistan Institute for Conflict and Security Studies (PICSS), July 2026 saw one of the sharpest security deteriorations in the province. The total provincial death toll was placed at 372 (up 241% from June), with Security personnel deaths was 62 total across the month, with civilian deaths 54, while militant and insurgent deaths were 238 in total across all counter-operations in the entire province in the whole month of July in 2026.

== Reactions ==
PM Shehbaz Sharif comments on the July 2026 Balochistan attacks, as published and edited by the official YouTube channel of Pakistan Muslim League (N) in Lahore.

- Pakistan: Federal interior minister Mohsin Naqvi issued a statement condemning the ambush, declaring that the fallen law enforcement officers were "the pride of our nation." Prime Minister Shehbaz Sharif blamed India for facilitating the attacks by providing monetary and material support. He later travelled to Quetta, vowing to continue the military operations.
- Qatar: The Ministry of Foreign Affairs issued an official statement condemning the armed attacks targeting the military and police personnel in Balochistan. It reiterated Qatar's "unwavering position of rejecting violence, terrorism, and criminal acts", extending condolences to the families of the victims, as well as to the government and people of Pakistan.
- Egypt: The Ministry of Foreign Affairs condemned the armed attacks in Balochistan, extending condolences to the government of Pakistan and to the families of the victims. It also emphasised full support in the government's efforts to maintain national security.
- Iran: Foreign Ministry spokesman Esmail Baghaei strongly condemned the attacks and expressed condolences to the families of the victims, and to the government and people of Pakistan. He reiterated Iran's long-standing opposition to terrorism and violent extremism in all forms.
- Saudi Arabia: The Ministry of Foreign Affairs condemned the attacks, expressed condolences to the families of those killed and affirmed its solidarity with the government and people of Pakistan against "all terrorist and extremist acts."
- United Arab Emirates: The Ministry of Foreign Affairs (MoFA) condemned "in the strongest terms the terrorist attacks that targeted several cities in Pakistan's Balochistan province". The MoFA "affirmed the UAE's strong condemnation of these criminal acts and its permanent rejection of all forms of violence, extremism and terrorism".

== See also ==
- 2026 Mali offensives
- Jan–Feb 2026 Balochistan attacks
