= 2017 Harnai bombing =

Terrorist attack in Balochistan province of Pakistan

August 2017 Harnai bombing
- Part of Balochistan conflict
- Harnai (Balochistan, Pakistan) Harnai (Pakistan)
- Location: Harnai District, Balochistan, Pakistan
- Date: 14 August 2017
- Target: Frontier Corps
- Attack type: Bombing
- Weapon: Improvised explosive device
- Deaths: 8
- Injuries: 0
- Perpetrator: Balochistan Liberation Army (claimed responsibility)

On 14 August 2017, an improvised explosive device targeted a Frontier Corps (FC) vehicle in Harnai district of Pakistan's southwestern Balochistan province. The attack left 8 FC troops dead. The Balochistan Liberation Army claimed responsibility for the attack.

== Background ==
Balochistan has witnessed separatist movement led by Baloch nationalist parties. Their objective is to achieve a separate and independent Balochistan state. The separatists' parties have been banned and are designated as terrorist organizations by the Pakistani government. In May 2017, these separatist militants carried out an attack on labourers working in Gwadar, Balochistan killing ten.

== Bombing ==
On 14 August 2017, Pakistan's 70th independence day, the Frontier Corps troops were on a routine patrol between Shahrag and Khost areas when their vehicle hit an improvised explosive device (IED) planted on their route. At the time of the incident, 8 troops were inside the vehicle out of whom 6 were killed while two were wounded. The next day, the two injured troops succumbed to their injuries raising the death toll to eight.

=== Victims ===
The six troops killed immediately after the explosion were identified as Lance Naik Yousaf Imran, Sepoys Shahabuddin, Muhammad Fayyaz, Muhammad Omer, Naeem and Fazlur Rehman. The following two death casualties were Subedar Hayatullah and driver Saadullah.

== Response ==
=== Security forces ===
Security forces reached the site and started a search operation. Commander Southern Command Lieutenant-General Amir Riaz and Inspector General FC Balochistan Major-General Nadeem Ahmed Anjum visited Harnai and chaired a high-level meeting to review the security situation.

On 31 August 2017, according to Dawn News, ten suspected militants were killed and three alleged militant camps were destroyed in an operation carried out by security forces in Balochistan's Harnai district. A large cache of arms and ammunition was also recovered during the operation.

=== Government ===
The Prime Minister of Pakistan Shahid Khaqan Abbasi condemned the attack saying, "Attack on this day, when the entire nation celebrates Independence Day will not deter our valiant forces from its duty towards the motherland. It is these soldiers who ensure our freedom through their sacrifices". CM Balochistan Sanaullah Zehri condemned the attack and said, "No effort would be spared to bring the culprits involved in this terrorist act to justice.

=== Perpetrators ===
A spokesman for Balochistan Liberation Army (BLA) claimed responsibility for the attack. He said, "The BLA has carried out a remote-controlled blast, which caused the death of eight soldiers".

== See also ==
- Terrorist incidents in Pakistan in 2017
- August 2017 Quetta suicide bombing, an attack that came two days earlier.
