= Attack on PNS Siddique =

Attack on the Pakistani military in 2024

| Date | 26 March 2024 |
| Location | Turbat, Pakistan |
| Result | Infiltration attempt foiled: All militants killed |

Belligerents
| Pakistan Navy | BLA |

Strength
| | 4 militants |

Casualties and losses
| 1 Frontier Corps soldier killed | 4 militants killed |

The Attack on PNS Siddique was a terrorist attack that occurred on 26 March 2024, at the PNS Siddique Naval Air Base in Turbat, Pakistan. The attack was carried out by the Majeed Brigade of the Balochistan Liberation Army (BLA). The BLA claimed responsibility for the assault, citing opposition to Chinese investments in the Balochistan.

== Background ==
The PNS Siddique Naval Air Base is Pakistan's second-largest naval air station, located in Balochistan. The BLA has been critical of China's involvement in Balochistan, accusing both China and Pakistan of exploiting the region's resources.

== Details ==
The Inter-Services Public Relations (ISPR) reported that militants attacked from three sides of the airport boundary, but the security forces successfully foiled the attempt to infiltrate. It reported that in the ensuing clearance operation, all four militants were successfully killed. It further said that a soldier from the Frontier Corps was also killed in the exchange of fire.

== Reactions ==
- Prime Minister Shehbaz Sharif commended the security forces for foiling the terrorist attack on the naval air base.
