= University of Karachi bombing =

2022 suicide bombing in Pakistan

- Part of the insurgency in Balochistan
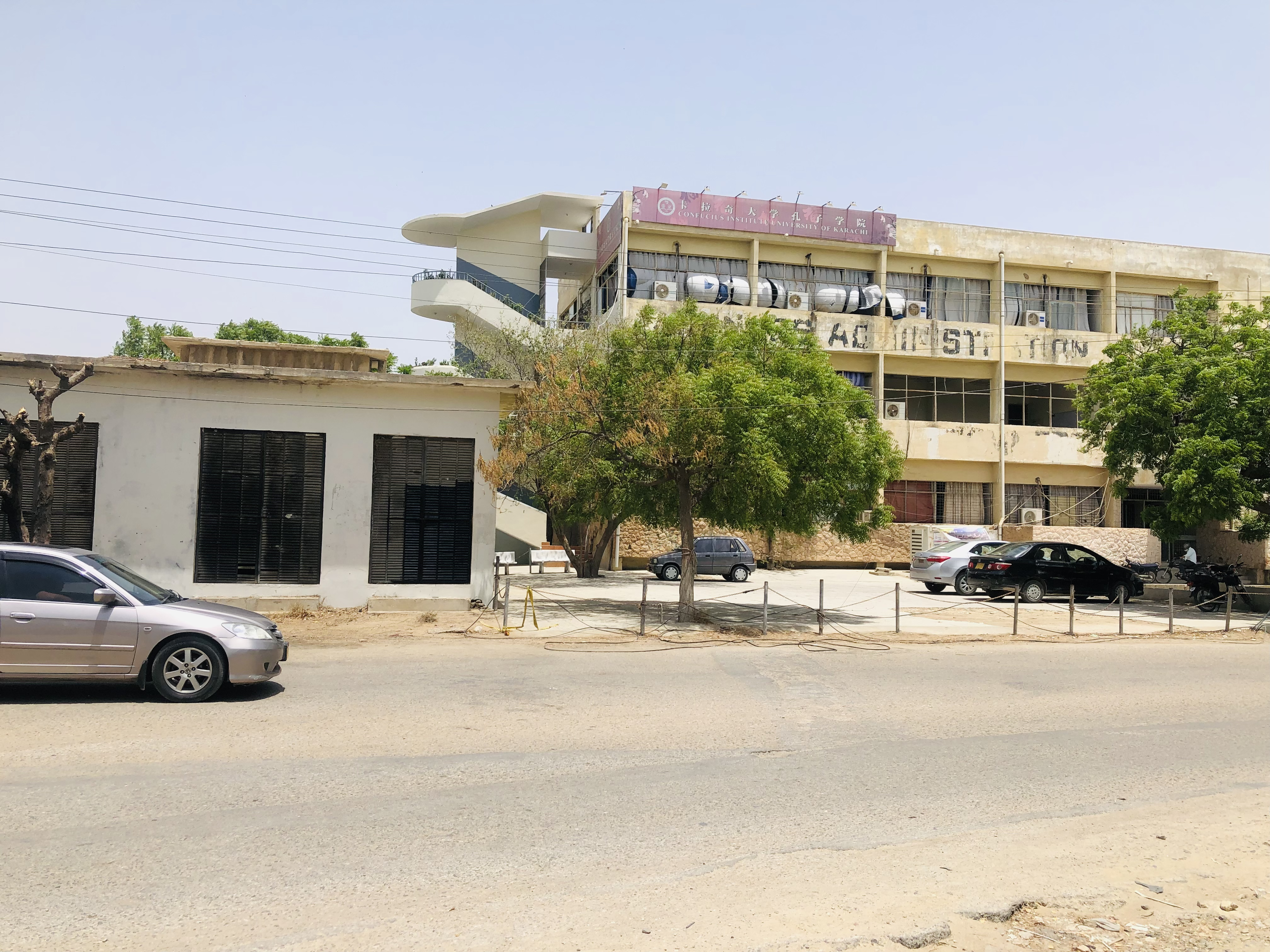
- Outer look of Confucius Institute Faculty of Commerce, after the blast, in 2022
- Location: Karachi, Sindh, Pakistan
- Date: 26 April 2022
- Target: Chinese lecturers of Karachi University
- Attack type: suicide bombing
- Deaths: 5 (including the perpetrator)
- Injuries: 4
- Perpetrators: BLA and BLF
- Assailant: Shari Baloch †

On 26 April 2022, a suicide bombing hit a van near the University of Karachi's Confucius Institute, killing three Chinese academics and their Pakistani driver. Militant group Balochistan Liberation Army claimed responsibility, saying that the perpetrator was the organization's first female suicide bomber.

Of the three Chinese killed, one was the director of the university's Confucius Institute. The other two were teachers. China, having lost confidence in Pakistan's ability to secure Chinese nationals, has since requested permission to deploy Chinese private security contractors to Pakistan.

== Perpetrator ==
The Balochistan Liberation Army, a group internationally designated as a terrorist organization, claimed responsibility for the bombing, which it said was done to discourage Chinese development programs in the region.

The bomber was identified as Shari Baloch, a 30-year-old secondary school science teacher from Kech District in Balochistan. She held bachelor's and master's degrees in education from the Allama Iqbal Open University, and had also obtained a master's degree in zoology from the University of Balochistan. She had reportedly enrolled in another postgraduate degree at the University of Karachi months before the attack, but was not reported to be a student there at the time. Shari had a daughter and son, both reportedly aged five; her husband, Habitan Baloch, who is also from Kech, is a dentist. In 2019, Shari Baloch was employed in the Balochistan Education Department and posted at a government secondary school in Kalatak, near Turbat, where she taught science to female students. However, she had been absent from the school for six months before the attack and had been served a show-cause notice, to which she had not responded. Her husband, Habitan, was also a lecturer at the Makran Medical College, and was undertaking a postgraduate degree in public health from the Jinnah Sindh Medical University. Her husband was reported to be involved in a training programme at Karachi's Jinnah Hospital, and had been staying in a hotel near the hospital at the time. The couple had rented an apartment in Gulistan-e-Johar, where Shari had been living for the past three years.

Shari Baloch's family has been described as "well-established, educated with no previous affiliation with any Baloch insurgent group." However, Shari herself had remained a member of the Baloch Students Organisation (Azad) group during her student life. Her motivations for the attack could not be ascertained, as no one in her immediate family had reportedly been a victim of human rights abuses. Hours before the attack, Baloch posted a farewell message on her Twitter account. Soon after the bombing occurred, her husband posted a Tweet in which he eulogised and praised Shari, describing her action as a "selfless act". Her husband's whereabouts were not known immediately after the attack, with raids being carried out by security forces to apprehend him and other suspected facilitators. On 27 April, Habitan Bashir Baloch, husband of Karachi University suicide bomber Shari Baloch, was arrested by security personnel, a day after the explosion, news agency ANI reported citing Pakistan's ARY News. Habitan is being interrogated by authorities. In a briefing chaired by Pakistan's interior minister, Rana Sanaullah, China's ambassador to Pakistan was apprised about the latest developments in the case.

Authorities in Pakistan said they have arrested a key orchestrator of the Karachi University bombing in July, the attack was the result of the combined efforts of two insurgent groups, the Balochistan Liberation Front (BLF) and the Balochistan Liberation Army (BLA).

== Reactions ==
The attack was strongly condemned by Pakistan, China, Saudi Arabia, United Arab Emirates, Oman, India, Kuwait, the United States, European Union, United Nations and United Nation Security Council.
