= David Wright-Neville =

Australian academic

David Peter Wright-Neville is a former Australian academic who specialised in international relations and terrorism. He was Deputy Director of the Global Terrorism Research Centre and an Associate Professor of Politics in the School of Political and Social Inquiry at Monash University until his resignation in 2009. His contributions to discussions on terrorism appear in Australian and overseas media In 2008, he was selected to participate in the Australia 2020 Summit.

== Government intelligence career ==
Prior to entering academia, Wright-Neville worked as one of Australia's most senior government intelligence analysts in the Office of National Assessments, Australia's peak intelligence agency. Until mid-2002, he was one of Australia's most senior terrorism analysts, primarily assessing and reporting on terrorist groups in Asia.

== Academia ==
His comments on a number of controversies in Australian politics have also attracted attention. In 2003, he supported his former colleague Andrew Wilkie, who resigned from the Office of National Assessments in protest against Australia's involvement in the Iraq War. Wright-Neville described Wilkie as "very competent, very capable and very trustworthy". In 2005, Wright-Neville publicly criticised the questioning of a Monash University politics student on the student's purchase of an academic text on terrorism. Wright-Neville alleged that the student had been unfairly targeted because of his Muslim background. Wright-Neville was also an outspoken critic of the Howard Government's treatment of Australian Guantanamo Bay inmate David Hicks. In an article in Melbourne newspaper, The Age, he described the treatment of Hicks as "outrageous in a human rights sense, and counterproductive from the perspective of counter-terrorism." He also described Hicks, as "a sacrifice to the Bush administration".

== Selected publications ==
Some of Wright-Neville's major publications include:

- David Wright-Neville, Sharon Pickering and Jude McCulloch 'Counter-Terrorism Policing in Diverse Communities' (Springer 2008)
- David Wright-Neville ‘Terrorism’ in R. Devetak, A. Burke and J. George (eds.) An Introduction to International Relations: Australian Perspectives (Cambridge University Press 2007)
- David Wright-Neville ‘Southeast Asian Security Challenges’ in R. Ayson and D. Ball (eds.) Strategy and Security in the Asia Pacific (Allen and Unwin 2006)
- David Wright-Neville ‘Terrorism as the Politics of Dashed Expectations’ Dialogue: Academy of the Social Sciences in Australia Vol.25 No.3. 2006
- David Wright-Neville ‘Dangerous Dynamics: Activists, Militants and terrorists in Southeast Asia’ Pacific Review Vol.17 No.1 2004
- David Wright-Neville, Pete Lentini & Marika Vicziany, Regional Security in the Asia Pacific: 9/11 and After (Edward Elgar, 2004).
- David Wright-Neville, 'Globalization and Terrorism: The Southeast Asian Experience' in Chris Nyland and Gloria Davies (eds.) Globalization: The Asian Experience London (Edward Elgar, 2004).
- David Wright-Neville, 'East Asia and the War on Terror: Why Human Rights Matter' in Paul Van Tongren (ed.) Searching for Peace in East Asia (Lynne Reiner Publishers, 2004).
