= Pakistan Stock Exchange attack =

Terror attack in 2020 in Karachi, Pakistan

2020 Pakistan Stock Exchange attack
- Location: Karachi, Sindh, Pakistan
- Date: 29 June 2020; 10:02 am–10:10 am (PST, UTC+05:00)
- Target: Pakistan Stock Exchange
- Attack type: Mass shooting, terror attack
- Weapons: Grenades, automatic rifles
- Deaths: 8 (including 4 perpetrators)
- Injuries: 7
- Perpetrator: Balochistan Liberation Army

On 29 June 2020, Balochistan Liberation Army (BLA) militants attacked the Pakistan Stock Exchange (PSX) building in Karachi with grenades and by firing indiscriminately. At least three security guards and a police sub-inspector were killed, while seven people were injured during the attack. Police reported that they killed all four attackers within 8 minutes.

== Attack ==
On 29 June 2020, at 10:02 in the morning, a car carrying the attackers arrived at the Pakistan Stock Exchange on I. I. Chundrigar Road. By 10:10 am, all four attackers were killed by security forces, according to the director-general of the Sindh Rangers. According to Rangers, the attackers aimed "not only to kill but to create a hostage situation". Once controlled, security personnel carried out a clearance operation and normalcy was restored to the locality within 35 minutes.

Militants armed with automatic rifles threw a grenade and then began firing at a security post outside the stock exchange. "They had come in a silver Corolla car," Karachi police chief Ghulam Nabi Memon later told Reuters.

Guards fought back, killing all four attackers, the authorities say, but police officers and security personnel were among the casualties. The stock exchange director, Abid Ali Habib, said the gunmen made their way from the car park and "opened fire on everyone". Reports say most people managed to escape or hide in locked rooms. Those inside the building were evacuated from the back door, Geo News reported.

One police officer and three security guards were among the casualties. Among those injured in the attack were three policemen, two security guards and a stock exchange employee. The injured were shifted to Civil Hospital. Four bags were recovered from the scene which included four SMGs, hand grenades, weapons, water bottles and dates.

== Investigation ==
DG Rangers Sindh Major General Umar Bukhari said in a press conference that the "attack was not possible without the help of foreign intelligence agency". According to the investigators, the mastermind of the attack is Bashir Zeb, the BLA's commander-in-chief, who is hiding in Afghanistan.

According to Raja Umar Khattab of Counter Terrorism Department (CTD), three of the four attackers were identified through their fingerprints as Salman, Tasleem Baloch and Siraj, all of whom were residents of Kech District, Balochistan. The car was purchased by Salman from a showroom located at Old Sabzi Mandi in Karachi, as records indicate he paid cash and submitted his Computerised National Identity Card, and registered the card himself. The car was clear as per the police record. According to Khattab, the attackers drove from Lyari Expressway's Gharibabad interchange and used Mauripur Road before the attack. The Gharibabad to Merewether Tower route was taken by the militants as identified through geofencing completed by the CTD. Militants took Lyari Expressway from Gharibabad to Maripur road and then from Tower and Custom House, they reached at PSX building.

Two mobile phones, one a smartphone, were recovered from the militants. They were apparently getting directions from someone by voice call.

== Responsibility ==
A group identifying itself as the "Majeed Brigade" of the Balochistan Liberation Army (BLA), a terrorist organisation listed by Pakistan, the UK and the US, claimed responsibility for the attack through a Twitter account. The spokesman also said that all the militants were suicide attackers. However, the BLA spokesman claims could not be confirmed, and his Twitter account was soon suspended.

Pakistan's foreign minister Shah Mahmood Qureshi said that India is activating sleeper cells in order to disrupt the peace in Pakistan. Meanwhile, the Special Assistant to the Prime Minister on National Security, Moeed Yusuf in a statement said "make no mistake, today’s attack in Karachi is state-sponsored terrorism against Pakistan". Pakistan's Prime Minister Imran Khan told the Parliament that there was "no doubt that India is behind the attack", and said his cabinet "knew" for two months that there would be an attack. Khan revealed that intelligence agencies had earlier foiled four terror attacks.

India's Ministry of External Affairs, while responding to Pakistan's foreign minister, denied any involvement in the attack and said that "Unlike Pakistan, India has no hesitation in condemning terrorism anywhere in the world, including in Karachi".

== Aftermath ==
The chief executive officer of a private security company in Pakistan stated that they will provide financial assistance to the families of security guards who were killed in the militant attack. Jafaria Disaster Management Cell (JDC), a welfare organisation, also announced that they will provide Rs 200,000 to the widows of the security guards who were killed in attack.

Two policemen, Muhammad Rafiq Soomro and Constable Khalil Jatoi Baloch were hailed as heroes in Pakistan for their bravery. Inspector-General of Sindh Police announced a reward of Rs 2 million for the police team and stated that even when their officer was killed they continued fighting the militants to prevent them from entering into the PSX building.

== Reaction ==
The PSX did not halt trading during the attack. The stock market closed at its usual timing. The KSE 100 Index recorded a gain of 242 points (0.71%) and closed at 34,181.80. However, for a moment due to early commotion, a sell-off started which pulled the index down to intra-day low by 220 points. Later, the benchmark also hit the intra-day high of 267 points.
