= 2024 Quetta railway station bombing =

Terrorist attack in Quetta, Pakistan

- Part of the insurgency in Balochistan
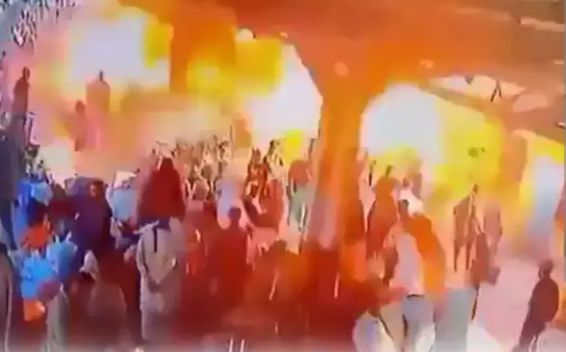
- A CCTV still of the bombing
- Location: 30°11′30″N 67°00′03″E; Quetta railway station, Quetta, Balochistan, Pakistan
- Date: 9 November 2024 c. 8:25 a.m. (UTC+05:00)
- Target: Civilians
- Attack type: Suicide bombing
- Weapon: Explosives
- Deaths: 32 (including the perpetrator)
- Injuries: 55
- Perpetrator: Balochistan Liberation Army: Majeed Brigade
- Assailant: Muhammad Rafiq Bizenjo ‡‡
- Motive: Baloch nationalism

On 9 November 2024, at least 32 people were killed and 55 others were injured in a suicide bombing at Quetta railway station in Quetta, Balochistan, Pakistan. The Balochistan Liberation Army (BLA), a separatist militant group, claimed responsibility for the attack. It was the first time that the BLA had attacked the centre of Quetta.

== Background ==
The Quetta railway station in 2023

The Quetta Railway Station is a major transport hub in Quetta and one of the largest stations in the province of Balochistan.

== Attack ==
At around 8:25 a.m., a suicide bomber detonated an explosive device on a crowded platform near the ticket office in the station, where around 150 to 200 people were waiting to board a train travelling to Rawalpindi. The explosion damaged the platform's roof and destroyed a tea stall. At least 32 people were killed, including soldiers and railway employees, and another 62 were injured. Several of the victims were taken to the hospital in critical condition.

The Balochistan Liberation Army, an ethnic secessionist group designated as a terrorist organization by China, the European Union, Iran, Pakistan, Russia, United Kingdom, and the United States, issued a statement claiming responsibility for the bombing saying it was carried out by the group's Majeed Brigade. The group said that it targeted soldiers, which the inspector-general of police in Balochistan, Moazzam Jah Ansari, described as being from the "Infantry School". The Counter Terrorism Department reported that the bomber had carried 8–10 kilograms (18–22 lb) of explosive material inside a bag.

== Casualties ==
Thirty-two people, including the perpetrator, were killed in the bombing, and 55 others were injured. The bomber's remains were sent for DNA testing for identification. Twenty-four of the victims were transferred to the Combined Military Hospital (CMH) and 13 to the Trauma Centre. Hospital officials stated that 25 injured patients were initially treated and discharged.

== Perpetrator ==
On 10 November 2024, the Balochistan Liberation Army released a photo of the bomber and identified him as Muhammad Rafiq Bizenjo. Bizenjo joined the BLA in 2017 under the alias "Washen" and volunteered for a suicide attack in 2023. He joined and trained with the Majeed Brigade for over a year.

== Aftermath ==
Two trains at the railway station, the Jaffar Express and the Bolan Mail, were suspended for four days after the bombing due to security concerns.

The Balochistan government declared three days of mourning from 11 to 13 November while security measures across Quetta were significantly increased.

== Reactions ==
The attack was condemned by Balochistan chief minister Sarfraz Bugti, National Assembly of Pakistan speaker Sardar Ayaz Sadiq, and Pakistani prime minister Shehbaz Sharif, along with the foreign ministries of Afghanistan, Iran, Sri Lanka, the United Arab Emirates, Jordan, the State of Palestine, and Turkey, and the US mission to Pakistan. World leaders and diplomats including Russian President Vladimir Putin, Malaysian Prime Minister Anwar Ibrahim, United Nations Secretary-General Antonio Guterres and British High Commissioner Jane Marriott conveyed their condolences and condemned the attack.

== See also ==
- 2025 Jaffar Express hijacking, another BLA railway attack
- August 2024 Balochistan attacks, another BLA attack targeting police and soldiers
