= Majeed Brigade =

Pakistani-based separatist militant group

- مجید بریگیڈ (Balochi); مجید بریگیڈ (Urdu)
- Founder: Aslam Baloch †
- Leaders: Hammal Rehan; Rehman Gul X
- Founded: 2010
- Dates active: 2010–present
- Part of: Balochistan Liberation Army

Majeed Brigade (Urdu: مجید بریگیڈ, romanized: Majeed Biriged), also spelt Majid Brigade, is a specialized unit of the Balochistan Liberation Army. It is tasked with carrying out high-stakes and high-profile unconventional attacks, such as suicide bombings, suicide missions, IED attacks/bombings, fedayeen attacks, and car bombings, against Pakistani security forces.

== History and activities ==
According to Majeed Brigade founder Aslam Baloch, the group received its name from two brothers (Majeed Langau Senior and Majeed Langau Junior). Baloch said the senior died on 2 August 1974 when a grenade in his hand detonated while sitting atop a tree. He was attempting to assassinate prime minister Zulfikar Ali Bhutto for dismissing the National Awami Party (NAP) government and for military operations in the province. According to Jehanzeb Iqbal, there are no recorded assassination attempts on Bhutto from this time period, including in the works of nationalist Baloch authors. Langove Junior is said to have died in Quetta, 2010, while fighting security forces.

From 2018 to October 2024, Majeed Brigade committed 12 suicide attacks on behalf of the Balochistan Liberation Army against the Pakistan Army, Pakistani police and civilians.

The first suicide operation that the organization did was in December 2011 in which they targeted Shafeeq Mengal, son of a former Pakistani federal minister and leader of a militia targeting Baloch militants; Shafeeq Mengal survived but 13 others were killed.

On June 29, 2020, Majeed Brigade claimed responsibility for the Pakistan Stock Exchange attack through Twitter.

On October 7, 2024, a member of the Majeed Brigade, Shah Fahad, committed a suicide bombing at the Karachi Airport killing two Chinese nationals at 23:00 local time, according to the Chinese embassy, the Chinese nationals were engineers that were part of the Chinese-funded enterprise Port Qasim Power Generation Co Ltd, which aims to build two coal power plants at Port Qasim, near Karachi.

In July 2024, the National Counter Terrorism Authority proscribed both the Hafiz Gul Bahadur group and Majeed Brigade as terrorist organizations for their role in suicide bombings and terrorist attacks including attacks done by the Majeed Brigade like against the Pakistan stock exchange, Chinese Consulate in Karachi and Confucius Institute at the Karachi university.

On November 10, 2024, the Balochistan Liberation Army released the identity of the perpetrator of the 2024 Quetta railway station bombing as Muhammad Rafiq Bizenjo who joined the Balochistan Liberation Army in 2017 before joining the Majeed Brigade for a year and volunteering to do the suicide attack.

On February 3, 2025, Mushtaq Koi, a high-ranking figure in Majeed Brigade, was stabbed to death in Kabul, Afghanistan by an unknown assailant.

On August 11, 2025, the United States designated the Balochistan Liberation Army (BLA) and its alias, the Majeed Brigade, as a Foreign Terrorist Organization (FTO). BLA was previously listed as a Specially Designated Global Terrorist (SDGT) Organization in 2019 by United States. The United States Department of State said "Terrorist designations play a critical role in our fight against this scourge and are an effective way to curtail support for terrorist activities." The United States' decision was welcomed by Chief Minister of Balochistan, Sarfraz Bugti.
