= Bashir Zaib =

Baloch militant

- بشیر زیب
- Military career
- Rank: Former Leader of the BLA
- Commands: Balochistan Liberation Army (2018-2026)
- Conflicts: Insurgency in Balochistan; August 2024 Balochistan attacks; 2026 Balochistan attacks

Bashir Zaib (Note: Balochi: بشیر زیب; also rendered as Bashir Zeb.) is a Baloch nationalist militant terrorist who led the Balochistan Liberation Army (BLA) from 2018 to November 2026. The group is designated as a terrorist group by Pakistan, China, the United Kingdom, the United States, the European Union and several other countries and organisations.

== Early life and education ==
Bashir Zaib was born in Nushki, Balochistan province, Pakistan, to a Baloch family belonging to the Muhammad Hasni tribe. He completed his diploma in mechanical engineering from the Quetta Polytechnic College. He later completed his master’s program in Balochi literature in 2008. During this time, he became involved in regional politics and became the chairman of the Azad faction of the Baloch Students Organization (BSO). The Azad faction was perhaps the most radical BSO faction and campaigned for Balochistan to separate from Pakistan.

Due to Zaib's activities in the BSO Azad, his admission in the University of Balochistan was prohibited in 2008. Zaib was also involved in distributing anti-Pakistan literature in Quetta, the provincial capital of Balochistan province. In 2010, Pakistani authorities launched a crackdown on BSO Azad, which possibly radicalised Zaib further.

== Militant career ==
Zaib joined the Balochistan Liberation Army in 2012. Following the death of his brother, Aslam Baloch, who had led the organisation from 2006 to 2018, Zaib succeeded him as the leader of the BLA in 2018.

In November 2026, Bashir Zeb was removed from his position of commander-in-chief of the BLA under unclear circumstances. The exact reason for his removal remains disputed.
