= August 2024 Balochistan attacks =

Terrorist attacks in Balochistan, Pakistan

- Part of the Insurgency in Balochistan
Date	26 August 2024
Location	Balochistan Province, Pakistan
Result	Inconclusive

Belligerents
Balochistan Liberation Army	Pakistan

Commanders and leaders
Bashir Zeb	(Pakistan) President Asif Ali Zardari; General Sahir Shamshad Mirza

Units involved
Majeed Brigade; Fidayeen Squad; Fateh squad STOS (Special Tactical Operations Squad)	Pakistan Armed Forces; Pakistan Army; Civil Armed Forces; Frontier Corps; FCB-N; FCB-S; Pakistan Police; Balochistan Police; Counter Terrorism Department; Balochistan Levies; Pakistani Intelligence community; ISI; MI; FIA

Casualties and losses
21+ insurgents killed	14 soldiers and policemen killed
- 60+ civilians killed, including 23 Punjabis executed by the BLA

On 26 August 2024, the Balochistan Liberation Army (BLA) launched a series of attacks in the Province of Balochistan in Pakistan. The attacks were carried out against civilian lorry drivers as well as military installations and police officers, killing at least 74 people, mostly unarmed civilians, and wounding many more.

== Background ==
The Pakistani province of Balochistan has been the theatre of a long running insurgency, which escalated in intensity in 2004. The insurgency has pitted Baloch militant groups against the government of Pakistan as well as the government of neighbouring Iran. 26 August holds special significance among Balochi nationalists as it marks the death anniversary of Nawab Akbar Shahbaz Khan Bugti, the Bugti Tribal chief who was a former Governor and Chief Minister of Balochistan. His death in a 2006 military operation was a pivotal event in the Balochistan insurgency, corresponding with a significant rise in militant activity. 2024 saw multiple violent incidents in the province, including the 2024 Iran–Pakistan border skirmishes that killed over a dozen civilian in both countries and the twin bombings in February that killed over 30 people in the Pakistani province.

Founded in 2000, the Balochistan Liberation Army has been battling the Pakistani government for greater autonomy in Balochistan, with the end goal of creating a sovereign state in the province. The BLA has cited natural resource exploitation in Balochistan as one of their largest issues with the government, demanding an increase in economic investment in the province as well as the expulsion of China.

== Attacks ==
The BLA announced the attacks on the evening of 25 August 2024, calling it Operation Herof and declaring it as an offensive against the Pakistani Army in Balochistan. The BLA attacked several sections of highways, such as the Karachi–Quetta section of National Highway 8, and damaged a train station, connected to Iran, in Mastung District. Suicide bombings were also reported during an attack against a Pakistani FOB in Bela. The Pakistani Army confirmed so far the killings of 14 soldiers and police officers during the attacks.

Twenty-three Punjabi people were killed on a highway in Musakhail District in what has been described as part of a larger ethnic cleansing campaign of Punjabi-origin people by Baloch militants in the region. About 30 or 40 armed militants offloaded passengers from trucks and buses and checked identities before shooting dead ethnic Punjabi passengers, then set fire to their vehicles. The BLA’s spokesman, Jeeyand Baloch claimed responsibility for the attack and claimed the victims were undercover intelligence personnel. Five more civilians were killed in Kalat District.

The BLA also reported that its Fateh Squad and Special Tactical Operations Squad (STOS) had set up blockades on major highways across Balochistan, leading to the deaths of 62 military personnel. “After achieving the objectives of Operation Herof, the roadblocks on all highways were lifted,” the statement read.

The Pakistani military said in a statement that at least 21 militants were killed by responding government forces. An attack against the railway facility also led to transit to Quetta being suspended.

== Reactions ==
Pakistani prime minister Shehbaz Sharif condemned the attacks, along with Chinese foreign ministry spokesperson Lin Jian.

== See also ==
- 26 August 2021 Balochistan attacks
- Jan–Feb 2026 Balochistan attacks (labelled "Operation Herof 2.0" by the BLA)
