= Balochistan Liberation Army =

Baloch separatist militant group

- بلۏچستان آجوییء لشکر
- Flag mainly used by the BLA
- Founder: Balach Marri
- Leaders: Rehman Gul (2026–present); Senior Command Council (November 2026); Bashir Zaib (2018–2026); Aslam Baloch † (2006–2018); Razzaq Mandali, alias Engineer †; Balach Marri †; Hyrbyair Marri
- Spokesperson: Jeeyand Baloch
- Dates active: 2000; 26 years ago – present
- Group: List: Majeed Brigade; Fateh Squad; STOS (Special Tactical Operations Squad); ZIRAB (Zephyr Intelligence, Research, and Analysis Bureau); Hakkal Media; QAHR (Qazi Aero Hive Rangers); HMDF (Hammal Maritime Defence Force)
- Headquarters: Kandahar, Afghanistan
- Active regions: Pakistan: (Balochistan, Pakistan) Balochistan; Sindh; Iran: Sistan and Baluchestan; Afghanistan: Nimruz; Helmand; Kandahar
- Ideology: Baloch nationalism Separatism; Ethnonationalism; Secularism
- Status: Active
- Size: 600 (2020); 5000 (2021 - present)
- Part of: Baloch Raaji Aajoi Sangar
- Wars: Insurgency in Balochistan: Sistan-Baluchestan insurgency

The Balochistan Liberation Army (BLA) (Note: Balochi: بلۏچستان آجوییء لشکر (بی ایل اے)) is a Baloch ethnonationalist militant organization based in the Balochistan region of Afghanistan. Operating primarily from regions across southern Afghanistan and southeastern Iran, the BLA perpetrates attacks in neighbouring Pakistan's Balochistan province, which it seeks to remove from Pakistani sovereignty. It frequently targets civilians, foreign nationals, Pakistani soldiers and policemen, and has carried out multiple massacres targeting non-Baloch civilians, including ethnic Punjabis, Sindhis, Pashtuns and Saraikis.

The BLA is also known for its anti-Chinese sentiment and attacks on Chinese civilians residing in Pakistan. It also regularly attacks schools, hospitals, and infrastructure projects in the province as well.

The BLA's first recorded activity was in mid-2000, when it claimed credit for a series of bombings against Pakistani authorities.

The BLA is designated as a terrorist organization by Pakistan, China, Iran, the United Kingdom, the United States, and the European Union.

== History ==
The BLA was founded in 2000, although some media and analysts speculate that the group is a resurgence of prior Baloch insurgencies, specifically the Independent Balochistan Movement of 1973 to 1977. According to some sources, two former KGB agents code-named "Misha" and "Sasha" were among the BLA's chief architects. According to them, the BLA was built around the Baloch Student Organization (BSO). The BLA disappeared following the withdrawal of the Soviet Union from Afghanistan as the USSR withdrew funding.

On 10 February 1973, Pakistani police and paramilitary raided the Iraqi embassy in Islamabad without the permission of the Iraqi government. During the raid, they found a large cache of small arms, ammunition, grenades, and other supplies in crates marked "Foreign Ministry, Baghdad"; they believed these were meant for Baloch rebels. Pakistan responded by expelling and declaring persona non grata the Iraqi Ambassador, Hikmat Sulaiman, and other consular staff. In a letter to U.S. President Richard Nixon on February 14, Pakistani president Zulfikar Ali Bhutto blamed India and Afghanistan, besides Iraq and the Soviet Union, for involvement in a: "conspiracy [...] [with] subversive and irredentist elements which seek to disrupt Pakistan's integrity".

In 2004, the BLA began a violent struggle against Pakistan for the separation of Balochistan from Pakistan, conducting terror attacks against the Pakistani military as well as non-Balochi minorities within Balochistan.

Pakistan designated the Balochistan Liberation Army as a terrorist organization on 7 April 2006 after the group repeatedly attacked security personnel. On 17 July 2006, the British government followed suit, listing the BLA as a "proscribed group" based on the Terrorism Act 2000. However, the U.K. harboured Hyrbyair Marri, the suspected leader of BLA, as a refugee, despite Pakistan's protest. The group's actions were described as terrorism by the United States Department of State.

In 2009, targeted attacks against Punjabi residents began soon after, causing about 500 deaths. The BLA leaders claimed responsibility for inciting the attacks. The BLA's factions have targeted non-Baloch from various ethnic backgrounds, including Pashtuns, Sindhis, Saraikis and Punjabis, whom the BLA consider "outsiders".

The United States designated the group as a global terrorist organization on 2 July 2019 and froze BLA assets. The European Union also designated the BLA as a terrorist organization.

On 16 January 2024, Iran carried out missile strikes on Pakistan's Balochistan province, specifically in Koh-e-Sabz in Panjgur District, targeting Jaysh al-Adl fighters' hideouts in Pakistan. According to Jaish ul-Adl, the strikes had killed 2 and injured 4 family members of its fighters. These strikes ignited the 2024 Iran–Pakistan conflict. On 18 January 2024, Pakistan carried out strikes on Baloch separatist targets in Sarvan in Iran's Sistan and Baluchestan province in retaliation. The Pakistani Ministry of Foreign Affairs said hideouts used by the BLA and the BLF were successfully struck and destroyed in the operation. Such Pakistani strikes were the first known instances of attacks on Iranian soil since the end of the Iran–Iraq War. Iran confirmed this by stating that the attacks killed and injured at least 9 foreign nationals living on its soil. Both the BLA and BLF also confirmed this by claiming that family members of their fighters were killed.

The Baloch Liberation Army and Baloch Liberation Front acknowledged the deaths of family members their fighters in the Iran–Pakistan clashes in 2024 and "vowed revenge" against the Pakistani state.

In 2025 one of BLA's groups, the Majeed Brigade, was designated as Foreign Terrorist Organizations (FTO) by the United States.

In November 2026, Bashir Zeb was removed from his position of commander-in-chief of the BLA under unclear circumstances. The BLA's Senior Command Council assumed temporary leadership of the group while a successor was selected. On November 15, the BLA announced that it appointed Rehman Gul, a former Pakistan Army captain who previously led the BLA's Majeed Brigade, as the new head of the group.

== Split ==
In 2017, BLA expelled its commanders, Aslam Baloch and Bashir Zaib, over disciplinary issues, particularly Aslam's unauthorized visit to India for medical treatment. This internal rift escalated into a major split, with BLA spokesman Azad Baloch publicly disowning both leaders. Subsequently, the group appointed Jeeyand Baloch as its new spokesman, while Bashir Zaib went on to lead a separate BLA faction. The split resulted in two factions: BLA–Azad and BLA–Jeeyand.

== Special Forces ==
=== Majeed Brigade ===
Majeed Brigade (also spelt Majid Brigade), is a specialized unit of the Balochistan Liberation Army which was founded by Aslam Baloch. The group received its name from the two (now deceased) Baloch separatist brothers, namely Majeed Langau Senior and Majeed Langau Junior. It is tasked with carrying out high-stakes and high-profile unconventional attacks, such as suicide bombings, suicide missions, IED attacks/bombings, fedayeen attacks, and car bombings, against Pakistani security forces.

=== Fateh Squad ===
Fateh squad is the specialized unit of the BLA. The unit was established in May 2021 and named after Fateh Qambrani, a BLA leader who was killed by the Pakistan Armed Forces in 2018. The Fateh squad is involved in terrorist attacks, primarily targeting Pakistans's Armed Forces, Civilians and Foreign Nationals.

It is known for participating in high-profile terrorism incidents, including the August 2024 Balochistan Attacks, which lead to the death of 74 people most of which were unarmed civilians, and wounding many more, and the 2025 hijacking of the Jaffar Express train where 380 passengers were taken hostage abroad the Jaffar Express, out of which 38 were killed by BLA terrorists.

Unlike the BLA's Majeed Brigade, which is known for suicide attacks, the Fateh squad specializes in high-intensity urban warfare, complex assaults, and follow-up operations. Their tactics often involve direct combat, storming military bases, convoys, and security posts following initial explosions or ambushes.

== Recruitment ==
The BLA has used social media to recruit members from the Baloch youth, developing an intelligentsia supportive of Baloch separatism, particularly in major urban centers.

== Funding ==
David Wright-Neville wrote that besides Pakistan, some Western observers claimed that India funds the BLA. In August 2013, U.S. Special Representative James Dobbins said:

"The dominant infiltration of militants is from Pakistan into Afghanistan, but we recognize that there is some infiltration of hostile militants from the other direction [India]. So Pakistan's concerns aren't groundless. They are simply, in our judgment, somewhat exaggerated."

Following arrest of an alleged BLA terrorist namely Brohi, according to CTD Karachi officials, Brohi confessed to collecting millions of rupees through extortion and ransom after joining the BLA.

Yunas Samad reported that Hyrbyair Marri has been the group's leader since 2007. However, in an interview in 2015, Marri denied having any contact with the group. Hyrbyair's brother, Balach, led the group from 2000 until he was killed in 2007.

It is also reported that BLA was actively involved in kidnapping for ransom activities.

According to the Ministry of Petroleum, the BLA and BLF were directly involved in smuggling Iranian oil. By 2024, 2.8 billion liters of smuggled oil—worth 227 billion rupees in government revenue—entered Pakistan; smuggling was temporarily depressed during Anwaar ul Haq Kakar's caretaker government from 2023 to 2024.

== Foreign involvement ==
=== India ===
Pakistan has repeatedly accused India of supporting Baloch rebels. Pakistan has also accused Indian consulates in Kandahar and Jalalabad, Afghanistan, of providing arms, training and financial aid to the BLA in an attempt to destabilize Pakistan. Pakistan has often accused the BLA of acting as an Indian proxy, alleging that Indian consulates in Kandahar and Jalalabad, Afghanistan, provided arms, training, and financial aid.

Baloch separatist Brahamdagh Bugti stated in a 2008 interview that he would accept help from India.

A leaked diplomatic cable sent on December 31, 2009, from the U.S. consulate in Karachi said it was "plausible" that Indian intelligence was helping the Baloch insurgents. An earlier 2008 cable, discussing the Mumbai attacks, reported fears by British officials that "intense domestic pressure would force Delhi to respond, at the minimum, by ramping up covert support to nationalist insurgents fighting the Pakistani Army in Balochistan."

In 2010 David Wright-Neville wrote in his book the Dictionary of Terrorism that outside Pakistan, some Western observers also believe that India secretly funds the BLA.

In August 2013, US Special Representative James Dobbins said Pakistan's fears over India's role in Afghanistan were “not groundless".

The Hindu reported that BLA commanders had sought medical treatment in India's hospitals using disguises and fake identities. One militant commander in charge of Khuzdar lived in Delhi for at least six months in 2017 while he underwent treatment for kidney ailments. The Express Tribune reported another commander, Aslam Baloch, received treatment at a New Delhi hospital.

In 2017, Kulbhushan Jadhav, an Indian naval officer arrested in March 2016 in Balochistan and charged with espionage and sabotage was sentenced to death. He was accused of operating a covert terror network within Balochistan. Jadhav had confessed that he was tasked by India’s intelligence agency, the Research and Analysis Wing (RAW), “to plan and organize espionage and sabotage activities” in Balochistan and Karachi.

In November 2020, the Foreign Office of Pakistan made public a dossier containing 'irrefutable proofs' of the alleged Indian sponsorship of terrorism in Pakistan. It contained proof of India's alleged financial and material sponsorship of multiple terrorist organizations, including the Balochistan Liberation Army. The dossier was shared with the United Nations Secretary-General António Guterres.

Since 2025, Pakistan uses the umbrella term "Fitna al-Hindustan" lit. 'The Curse of Hindustan' (often shortened as FAH) to refer to the Balochistan Liberation Army and its associated factions operating in Balochistan which it accuses of being sponsored by India.

Baloch separatist Hyrbyair Marri had denied that BLA had links with India, and India officially denies helping BLA.

=== Afghanistan ===
The Islamic Republic of Afghanistan acknowledged its covert support for BLA. After the death of Aslam Baloch, also known as Achu, in Kandahar, Afghan officials stated that Afghan police chief Abdul Raziq Achakzai had housed Aslam Baloch and other separatists in Kandahar for years. Tolonews reported that Aslam Baloch had resided in Afghanistan since 2005. BLA leader Balach Marri was killed in Afghanistan in 2007.

=== China ===
The BLA has strongly opposed the China-Pakistan Economic Corridor (CPEC), which constitutes part of China's Belt and Road Initiative. Due to its opposition to CPEC projects such as the Gwadar Port City, the BLA has recently focused on targeted terror attacks on Chinese nationals even outside Balochistan, including a 2019 attack on the Pearl-Continental Hotel in Islamabad and an attack on the Chinese consulate in Karachi.

== Activity and attacks ==
=== 2000–2010 ===
On 14 December 2006, BLA militants launched six rockets at a paramilitary camp in Balochistan's Kohlu District that then President Pervez Musharraf was visiting. Though Musharraf's life was not endangered, the Pakistani government labelled the attack an attempt on his life and initiated a sweeping army operation.

On 14 June 2009, masked gunmen shot dead Anwar Baig, a school teacher in Kalat. Baig had opposed recitation of the Baloch anthem in schools. The killing was part of a larger campaign against educators who were seen to be sympathetic to the Pakistani state. On 30 July, BLA militants kidnapped 19 Pakistani police in Sui, killed one and injured 16. Over the course of three weeks all but one of the kidnapped officers were killed by their captors.

In 2010, Nazima Talib, a female assistant professor at the University of Balochistan in Quetta was murdered, for which BLA later claimed responsibility. The reason for the murder, according to BLA, was due the deaths of two Baloch women in Quetta and Pasni and for the arrest of several Baloch women by Pakistan's police.

In 2010, BLA attacked schools, teachers, and students in the province.

On 14 August 2010, BLA militants killed six laborers and wounded three others on their way home from work in the Khilji area of Quetta.

=== 2011–2020 ===
On 21 November 2011, BLA terrorists attacked government security personnel who were guarding a mine in the northern Musakhel district, killing 14 and wounding 10. The BLA claimed to have killed 40. On 31 December, the BLA claimed responsibility for the suicide bomb targeting a Baloch politician, Naseer Mengal, at his home in Quetta. The suicide attack killed 13 people and injured 30.

On 26 May 2012, BLA took responsibility for the assassination of Muzafar Hussain Jamali, principal of a private school in Kharan. Jamali was travelling with his family when they were attacked. Jamali and his eight year old nephew died immediately, while his two daughters were injured. On 12 July, BLA took responsibility for abducting and killing 7 miners and 1 doctor. The miners were abducted in Soorang area on 7 July. The miners were later killed and their bullet ridden bodies were found. The victims were Pashtuns. Pakhtunkhwa Milli Awami Party (PkMAP) and miner labour union staged protest outside Balochistan High Court (BHC).

On 6 August 2013, BLA took responsibility for abducting and killing 11 passengers from a bus near Machh Town. The militants were disguised as security personnel. On 16 August, BLA claimed responsibility for attacking Jaffar Express near Machh. The attack claimed lives of two people and wounded ten. The Quaid-e-Azam Residency, a historical residence in Balochistan where Muhammad Ali Jinnah spent the last days of his life, was attacked by rockets on 15 June. The building was nearly demolished. BLA militants claimed responsibility. The militants removed the flag of Pakistan from the monument site, replacing it with a BLA flag. Reconstruction work was completed and the rehabilitated Ziarat Residency opened on 14 August 2014.

On 3 November 2014, BLA attacked United Baloch Army (UBA). Commander Ali Sher of UBA was killed in the attack. Four other UBA members were captured by BLA.

On 30 June 2015, BLA clashed with UBA in Dera Bugti. The attack resulted in death of 20 militants on both sides.

On 7 October 2016, BLA claimed responsibility for two blasts targeting Jaffar Express. The attack claimed lives of six people and wounded eighteen.

In 2017 ten Sindhi laborers were killed by two gunmen on motorbikes. BLA claimed the attack as a response to the China–Pakistan Economic Corridor. Victims were native of Sindh province. On 14 August, BLA claimed responsibility for a roadside bomb blast that killed 8 FC troops in Harnai.

On 23 November 2018, BLA claimed responsibility for killing four at the Chinese Consulate in Karachi. The attackers were killed by police during the attack. Later on, the mastermind of the attack, Aslam Baloch Achu, was killed along with five other commanders in Kandahar, Afghanistan.

Chinese nationals were targeted during a 2019 attack on the Pearl-Continental Hotel. On 11 May 2019, BLA claimed responsibility for an attack on the Zaver Pearl-Continental Hotel in the port city of Gwadar. Opposition to the construction of the Gwadar Port was claimed to be the main reason of the attack by BLA.

On 29 June 2020, four BLA militants attempted to attack and hold the Pakistan Stock Exchange attack in Karachi as hostage but were killed by security forces. On 15 October, at least fourteen security personnel were killed after a convoy of state-run Oil & Gas Development Company (OGDCL) was attacked. On 27 December, seven soldiers were killed in an attack on a Frontier Corps (FC) Balochistan post in Harnai district of Balochistan.

=== 2021–present ===
==== 2021 ====
On 7 March 2021, two navy personnel were killed in an attack, while en route to Ganz from Jiwani, Balochistan.

On 24 March, a bomb blast left at least three dead and another 13 injured.

On 28 May BLA accepted the responsibility of targeting a water supply vehicle of the Pakistan Army near a post at Nisau Dao Shah area of Kohlu with a landmine attack, which destroyed the vehicle and 4 personnel.

On 31 May 10 Frontier Corps soldiers were killed and 12 injured in two attacks, an IED attack in Turbat and an attack on a checkpoint near Quetta. The attack was claimed by BLA.

On 9 June, BLA accepted responsibility for an attack on the Pakistani army camp in the Karakdan area of Bolan Pass, in which two were killed and two others were critically wounded.

On 14 June, 4 Pakistani soldiers were killed in an IED attack at Marget Mines.

On 17 June, a Pakistan Army soldier was killed near Turbat airport, according to a statement from the Inter-Services Public Relations (ISPR).

On 25 June, five soldiers from Frontier Corps, Balochistan, were killed after terrorists targeted a patrolling party in Sibi district's Sangan area.

On 1 July, an explosion took place near a moving Frontier Corps (FC) vehicle, At least six people were injured.

On 15 July, two soldiers were killed in an IED blast during an operation in Pasni.

On 20 August, two children were killed and three wounded in an attack targeting Chinese nationals in Gwadar, Pakistan.

On 26 September a statue of Pakistan's founder Mohammad Ali Jinnah was destroyed by Baloch militants in the coastal city of Gwadar.

On 11 October, Shahid Zehri, a 35-year-old Pakistani journalist was killed in an attack claimed by BLA.

==== 2022 ====
On 25–26 January 2022, an attack on a security checkpoint in Kech Province led to the death of 10 Pakistani soldiers. On 2 February, nine militants and 12 soldiers were killed at Panjgur and Nushki districts. The BLA claimed to have killed more than 100 soldiers at two military camps, a claim rejected by Pakistani government. On 2 March, three people including a senior police officer in Quetta were killed by a roadside bomb. The BLA claimed responsibility.

On 26 April, the BLA claimed responsibility for a suicide bombing in which four people, including three teachers of Chinese origin at Karachi University, were killed. It further said that this was the first such bombing by a female member of the group (specifically Shari Baloch, a 30-year old science teacher and mother of two).

==== 2023 ====
On 13 August 2023, two BLA militants attacked a convoy of Chinese engineers in Gwadar. A spokesman for the BLA claimed 4 Chinese nationals and 9 Pakistani soldiers were killed with numerous others injured in the attack while the two BLA militants committed suicide. However, these claims went unconfirmed and officials claimed that no Pakistani or Chinese casualties were reported but that the BLA ambush was repulsed with two militants killed. After the attack, security restrictions were placed in Gwadar by Pakistani security forces.

==== 2024 ====
On 30 January 2024, at least six BLA fighters and four security officials were killed in an overnight attack in the city of Mach, south of Balochistan's capital, Quetta.

On 26 August 2024, at least 74 people, including 14 soldiers were killed in a series of attacks in Balochistan. The Liberation Army claimed responsibility. The Fateh squad was involved.

The BLA claimed responsibility for an attack on the airport motorway at Jinnah International Airport on October 6, 2024, in which at least ten people were injured and two Chinese nationals were killed.

On 9 November 2024, at least 31 people were killed along with the perpetrator and 2 others were injured in a suicide bombing at the Quetta railway station in Quetta, for which the BLA claimed responsibility.

On November 20, the Apex Committee announced military operation against BLA.

==== 2025 ====
On 11 March 2025, the BLA militants hijacked a Jaffar Express passenger train carrying hundreds of people from Quetta to Peshawar. After a 30-hour operation by the Pakistani army, it announced that the forces had successfully freed passengers held hostage by the rebel group. Pakistani officials said that 21 civilians and four security personnel lost their lives during the operation, and additionally a total of 33 militants of Balochistan Liberation Army, including suicide bombers, were killed by the security forces. There were 380 hostages, with 33 killed, and Fateh squad involvement.

In April 2025, the BLA carried out multiple attacks across Balochistan, Pakistan, beginning with a roadside bomb attack that killed three security personnel and injured 18 others in Mastung District on April 15, an IED attack targeting a bomb disposal squad in Kech District on April 17 that killed one soldier and injured two others, a grenade attack on security personnel near a checkpoint in Turbat, Kech District, on April 17, the capture of the Gwandh Saren Levies post in the Hoshab area of Kech District on April 20, and a major IED attack against a military convoy in the Margat area of Quetta on April 25 that resulted in the deaths of 10 soldiers, including senior officers.

On 10 April 2025, an explosion in Kandahar’s Aino Mina neighbourhood reportedly killed 12 members of Pakistani militant groups, including the Baloch Liberation Army (BLA) and Tehrik-i-Taliban Pakistan (TTP), and wounded five others, according to local sources. The blast occurred as militants were leaving a gathering, but Taliban officials denied any airstrike, attributing the explosion to old or decaying munitions stored near the anti-narcotics department. Residents reported hearing a powerful blast followed by gunfire, and Taliban emergency crews responded to contain the incident. While casualties among Taliban guards were acknowledged, the exact number was not disclosed, and Taliban spokespeople maintained that no foreign attack had taken place.

On 1 February 2025, a major incident took place in which the BLA fighters attacked military posts and government buildings and captured the village of Mangochar in Kalat district, Balochistan. The group was alleged to have installed checkpoints and allegedly killed a dozen of Pakistan Soldiers. The attackers left the area before the arrival of security forces. In response, law enforcement agencies launched a search operation to apprehend those involved, and traffic on the highway was restored later that night.

A day after the incident, two other attacks occurred in Mangocher against the Baloch levies. In the first incident, unidentified armed assailants on motorcycles opened fire killing Levies personnel Haq Nawaz on the spot. In a separate incident, a powerful explosion damaged the National Highway near Rahimabad.

In May, a Noshki Bus Attack 5 killed, including 2 civilians, with Fateh qquad involvement.

On 11 July 2025, BLA militants launched Operation Baam against Pakistan army in which they claimed that 18 Pakistani soldiers were killed by the BLA militants including many kidnapping too (allegedly). The victims of this BLA terror attack in Zhob, Balochistan, were laid to rest in various cities across Punjab. Militants forcibly removed Punjabi passengers from a bus, verified their identities, and executed them. The bodies were returned to families in cities like Dunyapur, Faisalabad, Lahore, and others, with funerals held under tight security.

On 15 July 2025, a bus carrying Pakistan Army personnel in the Quetta and Kalak regions was bombed by BLA militants. According to BLA 29 soldiers including a senior officer were allegedly killed in the attack. The explosion was carried out by the help of IEDs.

On 29 December 2025, authorities in Pakistan said a girl was stopped during a routine police inspection of buses while traveling southwestern Balochistan to Karachi. Officials said she was detained in connection with a suspected suicide bomb plot and alleged that she had been targeted by the Baloch Liberation Army. Sindh Home Minister Ziaul Hassan said the group allegedly told her an attack would bring her "honor and recognition" within the Baloch community.

==== 2026 ====
On 31 January, in a series of coordinated attacks across multiple districts in Balochistan, BLA militants engaged in armed assaults and suicide bombings targeting schools, hospitals, banks, markets, security installations, police stations, a high-security prison, and civilian areas. The BLA claimed that the attacks were in retaliation for security force actions against their members.

The BLA labelled the attacks "Operation Herof 2.0", as a follow up to the August 2024 Balochistan attacks (which it labels Operation Herof), and described the operations as simultaneous strikes on military and administrative targets, with videos released by the group showing female fighters participating. In response to BLA's "Operation Herof 2.0", Pakistani Security Forces launched "Operation Radd ul Fitna-1". Pakistani officials reported that security forces had thwarted most attempts and killed over 216 militants, engaging in clearance operations that lasted until 5 February.

On 23 May, 24 people are killed and over 50 are injured after the explosion of a bomb at a car park near a train station in Quetta. The BLA claims responsibility.

== See also ==
- Baloch nationalism
- Balochistan Liberation Front (BLF)
- Baloch Students Organization
  - Baloch Students Organization – Awami
- Anti-Chinese sentiment in Pakistan
- List of designated terrorist groups
  - Terrorism in Pakistan
- Ethnic nationalism
