= 2025 Balochistan protests =

Protests against arrests of political crises

- Date: 20 March 2025 - 16 April 2025
- Location: Balochistan, Pakistan
- Caused by: Jaffar Express hijacking; Human rights abuses in Balochistan; Demands to release disappeared Baloch individuals; Arrests of Mahrang Baloch and associated activists
- Goals: Identifications of people killed in the Jaffar Express hijacking; Releases of disappeared Baloch individuals and activists arrested during the protests

A series of protests and organized shutdowns took place in the Pakistani province of Balochistan beginning on 20 March 2025, some eight days after the Jaffar Express hijacking. Initial protests, organized by Baloch Yakjehti Committee (BYC), began in Quetta in response to police crackdowns against Baloch residents gathering at the Quetta Civil Hospital in hopes of identifying the bodies of loved ones who may have been killed in the hijacking incident; several participants stole some of the bodies before police retrieved some of them back and began arresting organizers behind the protests. On 21 March, police began firing at the thousands of protesters gathered at Quetta demonstrating due to demands to release Baloch individuals, killing three people and injuring several others. Authorities arrested BYC chief and Baloch human rights activist Mahrang Baloch and other activists, sparking protests and shutdowns throughout the region in response. Protests had additionally spread to the Sindhi city of Karachi and at multiple European nations as organized by the Baloch National Movement and the Baloch diaspora, although the former protests were quickly suppressed by authorities.

== Background ==
The province of Balochistan has been involved in insurgencies and conflicts by Baloch separatists against the government of Pakistan since at least 1948. This is due to the alleged forced disappearances and violations of the rights of Baloch people by the Pakistan army and extreme poverty as well as under-developed infrastructure in Balochistan. Since 2001, armed groups in the region have conducted various violent attacks and campaigns to discourage major development in the region that they believe would benefit other provinces.

The Balochistan Liberation Army is a Baloch ethnonationalist group founded in 2000. Members of the organization stated that their intentions were to achieve regional independence from Pakistan and control over the land's natural resources, primarily its oil and minerals. The faction had previously launched attacks on civilians and, most often, Pakistani security forces. On 11 March, the BLA ambushed and hijacked the Jaffar Express train as it was traveling from Quetta to Peshawar. The dozens of BLA militants stopped it and took its passengers hostage. Pakistani security forces launched a large-scale counter-operation — named Operation Green Bolan – at the raid site, rescuing all the surviving hostages and killing all 33 BLA insurgents on 12 March 2025. Officials confirmed that 26 non-insurgents were killed in the hostage crisis. The participating political parties at the National Assembly conference on 13 March 2025 unanimously passed a resolution condemning the attack and commending authorities for defusing the hostage crisis.

== Protests ==
=== 20 March ===
On 20 March 2025, families had attempted to gather around the Quetta Civil Hospital, hoping to identify the 23 bodies from the train hijacking that were brought there. Police forces began attacking the gatherers using batons to try to disperse them, injuring several women in the process. Further outrage from the civilians were sparked upon reports that 13 of the bodies were quickly buried at the Kasi graveyard by police forces, some of whom wanted to identify them. The public protests led to authorities allowing some families in the hospital and returning five bodies to their relatives.

=== 21 March ===
Quetta gatherers began to launch a demonstration at the Quetta Civil Hospital, some of whom wore masks, barged into the morgue, and took bodies with them. Hospital officials and the Baloch Yakjehti Committee (BYC) both confirmed that protesters associated with the organization took the bodies with them in hopes of identifying their loved ones who were killed at the Jaffar Express hijacking. Authorities stated that the bodies remaining in the morgue were of killed BLA insurgents. Police forces then carried out raids throughout Quetta and retrieved some of the bodies. A BYC spokesperson claimed that several individuals were arrested or injured in the raid series. Additional arrests were carried out due to alleged connections to the incident. Authorities confirmed that subsequent calls for protests were fueled by the conflict between protesters and police in response to the militants' bodies.

Later, thousands of protesters gathered at Quetta, demanding the release of Baloch individuals who disappeared. The Quetta protests were cracked down upon by police. The Baloch Yakjehti Committee accused police forces of using excessive force against the protesters by firing at them, killing three of them and injuring dozens of others, including seven who were critically injured. Balochistan's government spokesman Shahid Rind claimed that the protesters provoked police using stone-throwing and other methods of violence. BYC chief and Baloch human rights activist Mahrang Baloch led the protests and vowed a sit-in at Sariab Road. Protesters proceeded to launch a sit-in at Sariab Road near the University of Balochistan, where police used tear gas, water cannons, and blank rounds to disperse them. The Bolan Medical College Hospital and Quetta Civil Hospital confirmed several deaths and injuries from the protest suppression. Mahrang Baloch claimed that the protests were fueled by the arrests of BYC leader Bebarg Baloch and several members of his extended family and that three people were killed in the protests while thirteen others were injured. The Balochistan government's spokesman argued that protesters pelted police with stones, injuring ten of them in the process. The BYC continued to call for strikes for the next day.

=== 22 March ===
Mahrang Baloch condemned the Quetta protest suppression on X, stating that police indiscriminately fired on the peaceful protesters. She along with associate members of the BYC were arrested while the former was participating at a sit-in to protest against humans rights abuses against the Baloch community. The BYC shared a post from Mahrang Baloch that called for Balochistan's state shutdown in response to police violence. It posted photos and videos of various towns and cities from Balochistan participating in the shutdown by closing shops and roads and protests where participants reportedly burned tires to block the roads. Cellular services were reported to have also been shut down.

=== 23 March ===
Protests throughout parts of Balochistan were fueled in response to police crackdowns on BYC-organized protests and the arrests of Mahrang Baloch and other involved activists.

=== 24 March ===
Businesses closed in protest as demonstrations continued in the Panjgur District. Police deployed tear gas against protesters. In the Sindh city of Karachi, police broke up protests there and detained twenty BYC protesters, six of whom were booked under arrest in a code that was deployed by Karachi Commissioner Syed Hassan Naqvi under Section 144 of the Code of Criminal Procedure, which banned all gatherings in the city. The protests and closed roads in Karachi resulted in large traffic jams there.

The Baloch diaspora in Germany, the United Kingdom, and the Netherlands organized protests under the Baloch National Movement, where they condemned Pakistan's acts of disappearing or arresting Baloch individuals including from the 22 March arrests. A BNM spokesman called on international groups to "intervene and support the Baloch nations' right to freedom, ensuring the liberation of Balochistan".

=== 25 March ===
Businesses remained closed in protest in various coastal cities in Balochistan in support of the BYC. Balochistan National Party (Mengal) (BNP-M) president Sardar Akhtar Mengal announced a march from Wadh to Quetta on 28 March in response to the arrests of the BYC leaders.

=== 26 March ===
In the Dutch city of Amsterdam, members of the Pashtun Tahafuz Movement joined in the protests organized by the BNM for Baloch solidarity.

=== 27 March ===
The BNP-M organized protest rallies and sit-ins at Quetta, Panjgur, Noshki, and other Balochistani areas to protest against their provincial government and demand the release of Mahrang Baloch, Sammi Deen Baloch, and other BYC members arrested by authorities. The BYC confirmed that security forces arrested two additional female Baloch activists while they were returning from protests at the Balochistani city of Uthal.

=== 28 March ===
The BNP-M initiated a march from Wadh to Quetta, with Sardar Akhtar Mengal reporting that he and his party of protesters had reached Kalat despite the multiple roadblocks that he said were placed as deliberate obstacles for them, such as containers blocking the way and suspended mobile services. In his post on X, he continued by urging the participating protesters to remain peaceful regardless of antagonization by opposing forces. The party announced that they were expected to reach Quetta by nighttime. Balochistan government spokesman Shahid Rind explained that internet services were suspended to address "security threats".

=== 29 March ===
Mengal stated that if the Balochistani government did not allow them into Quetta, then they would march into Islamabad; otherwise, they would perform a sit-in within Quetta until all arrested BYC members were released. At Mastung, police detained 250 activists before they were to head out to Quetta. Later in the same area, a suicide bomber injured four protesters but killed nobody else in the process. Early, Pakistan Levies forces spotted the suicide bomber and attempted to pursue him before he detonated himself. Meanwhile, thousands of protesters were gathered in Panjgur under the leadership of the BYC, holding banners and making chants demanding the release of BYC leaders.

=== 30 March ===
The BNP-M rally was denied entry into Quetta by its government. Mengal and other party leaders stated that the sit-ins would still continue until their demands of BYC activists being released were released. Mengal stated that if they were to be denied entry into Quetta, then they would hold sit-ins at Mastung.

=== 31 March ===
The BNP rally, led by Mengal and other leaders, continued to hold sit-in protests at Lakpas for a third day because authorities denied them entry into Quetta. A total of 12 districts in Balochistan reported travel difficulties for regular citizens and medical services given blocked access from the rallies. Delegates of the Jamiat Ulema-e-Islam party, led by Abdul Wasey, visited the camp to express solidarity with them.

=== 2 April ===
Mengal announced that he would initiate new protest waves tomorrow because of the demands of the releases of BYC activists not being realized and the lack of breakthrough in talks with government officials. Balochistan government officials confirmed that they were making negotiations and that peaceful protests were to be legally protected but defended their early actions against the "illegal" BYC demonstrations that resulted in arrests.

=== 16 April ===
The BNP-M party ended its sit-in rally after having lasted for 20 days, with Sardar Akhtar Mengal stating that the people of Balochistan were becoming negatively affected by the road blockades. He also confirmed that the usual protests were to continue.

== Reactions ==
The protest suppressions, especially the arrests of Mahrang Baloch and other activists, were widely condemned by human rights organizations. Sarah de Roure, the global head of protection at Front Line Defenders, connected the incidents to a "complex web of violence and human-rights violations at Balochistan that creates a very challenging environment for human-rights defenders, particularly women human-rights defenders, working on issues of enforced disappearance". She specified that Mahrang Baloch was targeted specifically because she spoke publicly on enforced disappearances. In response to Pakistani suppression of Balochistan protests, the Baloch Human Rights Council called on the United Nations to intervene by advocating for the release of arrested activists. The United Nations Human Rights Council created a press release on 26 March condemning the enforced disappearances of Baloch individuals and the suppression of Pakistani activists. They urged for the releases of Mahrang Baloch, Sammi Baloch, and other human rights defenders and for authorities to stop using counter-terrorism measures against them. Pakistan's Ministry of Foreign Affairs spokesman Shafqat Ali Khan rejected the UN's statement, considering it to be based on "selective and unverified media reports". Amnesty International condemned the "relentless" crackdowns on Baloch activists and voiced concern over reports that they were not given medical assistance despite their deteriorating health while in custody. Babu Ram Pant, the regional director for the South Asian branch, demanded the release of all activists and an investigation into the usage of unlawful force against them during the early Quetta protest suppression.

== See also ==
- Baloch Long March

2025 protests

- 2024–present Serbian anti-corruption protests
- 2025 Turkish protests
- 2025 Indonesian protests
