= Gulzar Dost =

Baloch human rights activist

- گلزار دوست
- Born: Tejaban, Balochistan
- Education: University of Balochistan
- Occupation: Human rights activist
- Employer: Kech Civil Society
- Organization: Baloch Students Organisation
- Known for: Documenting human rights abuses in Balochistan

Gulzar Dost (Balochi: گلزار دوست) is a Baloch human rights activist. He is the convener of Kech Civil Society, a human rights group based in Kech District, Balochistan, Pakistan, which documents, monitors and reports on human rights abuses in the area. In 2022, he gained prominence for completing a 776 kilometre walk barefoot to raise awareness of the issue of enforced disappearances in Balochistan.

== Early life and education ==
Dost was born and raised in Tejaban, a village in Balochistan. He was educated in Quetta and graduated with degrees in journalism and political science from the University of Balochistan. During his time at university, he was a member of the Baloch Students Organisation.

== Activism ==
Dost first rose to prominence as a human rights activist in 2022, when he completed a 776 kilometre walk barefoot from Turbat, the administrative centre of Kech District, to Quetta, the state capital of Balochistan. He organised the march through Voice for Baloch Missing Persons, a non-government organisation representing family members of people subject to enforced disappearances in Balochistan. Dost named the march in honour of Mama Qadeer, who had previously marched over 2000 kilometres from Quetta to Islamabad to raise awareness of Baloch missing persons.

Dost was also critical of the treatment of Balochs and Sindhis in Pakistan, including high rates of drug use among the respective communities, which he described as a "genocide" caused by Pakistani authorities. Dost also publicly criticised the presence of the Frontier Corps, a paramilitary organisation, in Balochistan, accusing the government of using them to withhold thousands of acres of land from Baloch people, which he compared to the 1894 Land Acquisition Act of the British Raj era.

In March 2026, Dost was among 12 Baloch activists, including Sabiha Baloch, declared as "offenders" in a pending court case.

== Arrests ==
In July 2024, Dost was placed under house arrest, preventing him from attending the Baloch National Gathering in Gwadar, organised by the Baloch Yakjehti Committee, a local human rights group. The conditions were lifted shortly after the gathering concluded, leading to criticisms from international human rights organisations such as Front Line Defenders that his arrest had been politically motivated. That same year, it was reported that Dost had been placed onto the Fourth Schedule watch-list under the Anti-Terrorism Act 1997 subjecting him to restrictions including on his movement, finances, and employment.

In the early hours of 6 July 2025, Dost was abducted from his home in Absar area of Turbat by plainclothes officers from the Counter Terrorism Department. He was reportedly blindfolded and transported to an initially undisclosed location. On 7 July 2025, Dost was presented in court, where it was confirmed he had been taken into CTD custody at their local headquarters in Kech District; a judge agreed his ongoing detention. It was confirmed that Dost had been accused of several offences, including "provocative speech against the state".

=== Response ===
Following his initial arrest, Dost's family alleged that he had been arrested without a warrant being issued, and called on Pakistani authorities to uphold his legal and constitutional rights to a fair trial and investigation.

Locally, the Baloch Yakjehti Committee expressed its "outrage" at Dost's arrest, describing the charges against him as "false" and having a political motivation; it called for his immediate release and concluded "the attempt to criminalise dissent will not succeed". The Human Rights Council of Balochistan called Dost's initial arrest "a blatant act of enforced disappearance" and reported that he had experienced ongoing harassment from the CTD due to his participation in peaceful protests organised by the Baloch Yakjehti Committee.

Internationally, Front Line Defenders expressed concern around Dost's ongoing detention and described the charges against him as "spurious and aimed at suppressing his human rights work". Amnesty International called on Pakistani authorities to end its use of the law to suppress Baloch human rights activists, and called for Dost's immediate release from custody.
