= Sabiha Baloch =

Baloch human rights activist and political worker

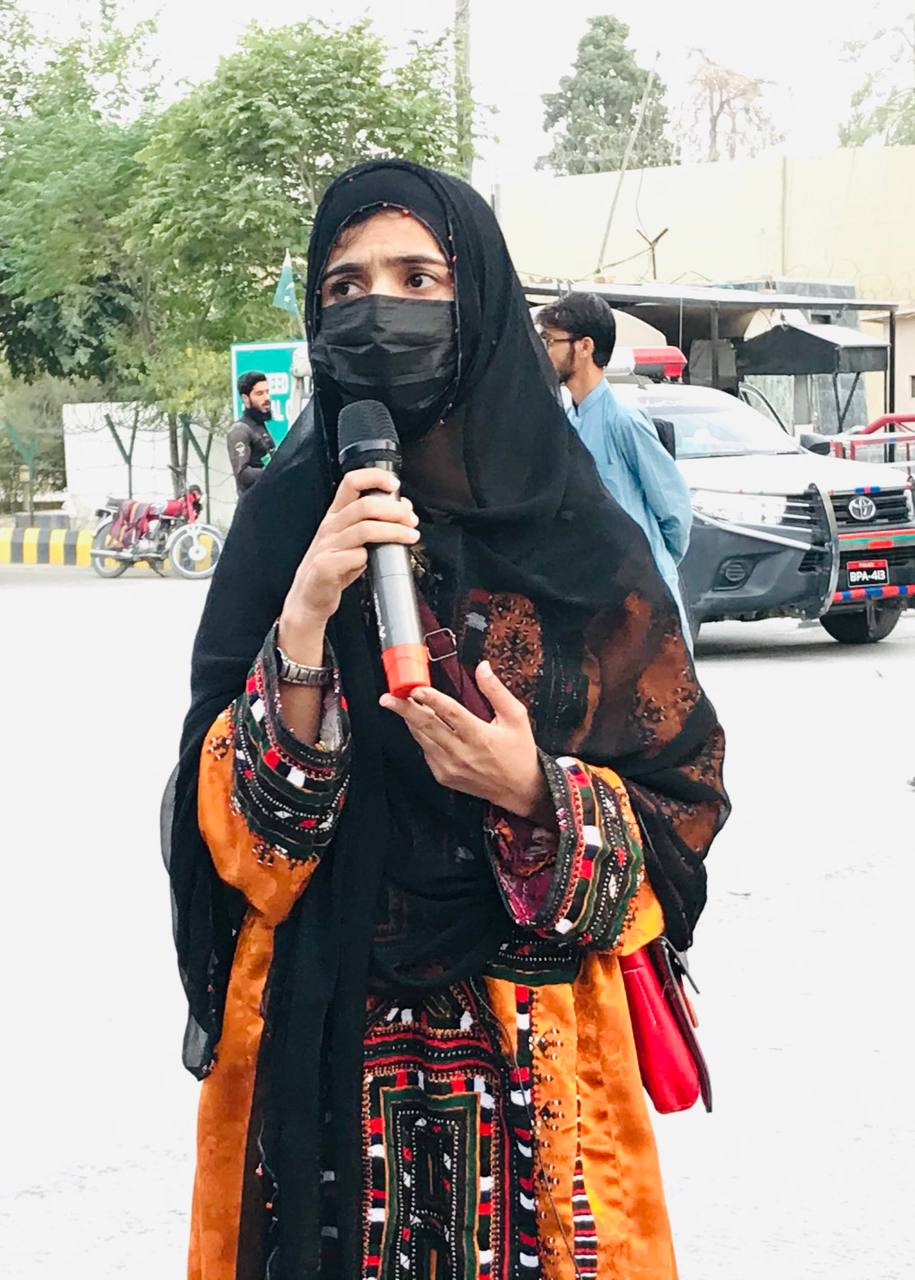
- Born: Khuzdar, Balochistan
- Education: Bolan Medical College (MBBS)
- Occupation: Human rights activist
- Movement: Baloch Yakjehti Committee

Sabiha Baloch (Balochi: صبیحه بلۏچ) is a human rights activist and a leader of the Baloch Yakjehti Committee (BYC). She was a former chairperson of Baloch Students Action Committee (BSAC).

In July 2024, Sabiha, along with Sammi Baloch and other members of the BYC, was arrested during the Baloch Raji Muchi protests in Gwadar, where security forces killed three protesters and injured dozens.

== Early life and education ==
Sabiha Baloch was born in Zawa, a village in Khuzdar District, Balochistan, into the Zarrakzai tribe. Despite initial resistance from her family due to traditional norms, she pursued education independently. She enrolled at a college in Khuzdar and later joined a science academy founded by Professor Abdul Razaq Zehri. During this period, she supported herself by tutoring other students. Political violence and unrest in the region affected her educational journey, including the assassination of her mentor in 2013.

She later attended Bolan Medical College in Quetta, where she studied medicine.

== Political activism ==
Sabiha has faced reprisals for her activism. Her brother and cousin were forcibly disappeared due to her work, later released after three months in detention. She took part in a protest in Turbat, Balochistan, against the extrajudicial killings of four victims of enforced disappearance in November 2023.

=== Human rights work ===
Following the end of her term with BSAC, Baloch became a key figure in the Baloch Yakjehti Committee (BYC), a rights-based organization focused on enforced disappearances and extrajudicial killings in Balochistan. She participated in and helped organize protest and leading marches and sit-ins, including demonstrations following the death of Balach Mola Baksh in 2023. Baloch has been arrested and reportedly subjected to police violence during her activism. In June, a month before the Baloch Raaji Muchi (Baloch National Gathering), she was arrested and beaten by the Police for protesting against enforced disappearances in Quetta.

On 5 April 2025, the father of Baloch human rights defender Dr. Sabiha Baloch was arrested by Pakistani authorities. His whereabouts remain unknown, and, as of 13 April, he is still in custody. The arrest has been described by human rights observers as a direct reprisal for Dr. Baloch's activism and an attempt to pressure her to surrender to the authorities or cease her human rights work.

In October 2025, Sabiha was among 32 Baloch activists named as "proscribed individuals" under the Fourth Schedule of the Anti-Terrorism Act.

In March 2026, Sabiha was among 12 Baloch activists, including Gulzar Dost, declared as "offenders" in a pending court case.

=== Advocacy and public statements ===
Baloch has emphasized the importance of collective action, political education, and the role of women in social movements. She has publicly advocated for increased awareness and mobilization among Baloch communities regarding their rights and political situation.
