= Baloch Long March =

2023 protest in Pakistan

March Against Baloch Genocide by Baloch Yakjehti Committee (BYC)
- Date: December 2023
- Location: From Kech district, Balochistan to Islamabad, Pakistan
- Caused by: Protest against enforced disappearances and extrajudicial killings in Balochistan
- Methods: Peaceful protest, long march, sit-in

Parties
Baloch women and activists	Pakistani authorities

Lead figures
Mahrang Baloch and other Baloch women and activists	Islamabad Inspector General (IG) Dr Akbar Nasir Khan	Baloch Yakjehti Committee (BYC)
- The march was marked by resistance from authorities, with many protesters being detained. The issue was later taken up by the Islamabad High Court.

The March Against Baloch Genocide was a protest march led by Mahrang Baloch and other Baloch women of the Baloch Yakjehti Committee in December 2023, who were marching towards the Pakistani capital Islamabad to protest human rights violations and enforced disappearances in Balochistan. The march was a response to the growing number of enforced disappearances and extrajudicial killings in the region.

== Background ==
The march was spurred by the death of Balaach Mola Bakhsh in November 2023. Bakhsh was arrested on November 20, with explosives in his possession according to the Counter Terrorism Department (CTD). He appeared in court on November 21, but was killed on November 23 in what the CTD said was a confrontation between police and a militant group. Bakhsh's family rejected the CTD's report, saying that Bakhsh was abducted from his home on October 29, and was killed on November 23 by the CTD. Local protests began, in an effort to make police file a report against the CTD personnel accused of Bakhsh's death.

== Organization ==
The Baloch March against Baloch Genocide was initiated by the Baloch Yakjehti Committee (BYC), a non-profit organization spearheaded by Mahrang Baloch and other prominent figures.

== The March ==
The march began in Balochistan on December 6, 2023. The movement involved hundreds of women who had lost their husbands, brothers, and sons and decided to voice their concerns publicly. The demonstrators had explicit requests: they demanded a halt to forced disappearances and unlawful killings, and they sought accountability for those implicated in the unlawful killings of Baloch youth.

They covered a distance of 1,600 kilometers, starting from the southern Kech district near the Iranian border, all the way to Islamabad, Pakistan’s capital. They stopped along the way in places like Kalat, Dera Ghazi Khan, and Dera Ismail Khan, where they received support from the local residents.

When the march reached Islamabad, authorities prevented the marchers from entering the capital, specifically the National Press Club.

Jamaat-e-Islami’s Senator Mushtaq Ahmed visited the protest camp in Islamabad to show support for the Baloch demonstrators.

== Baloch Yakjehti Committee's March Initiatives and Declarations ==
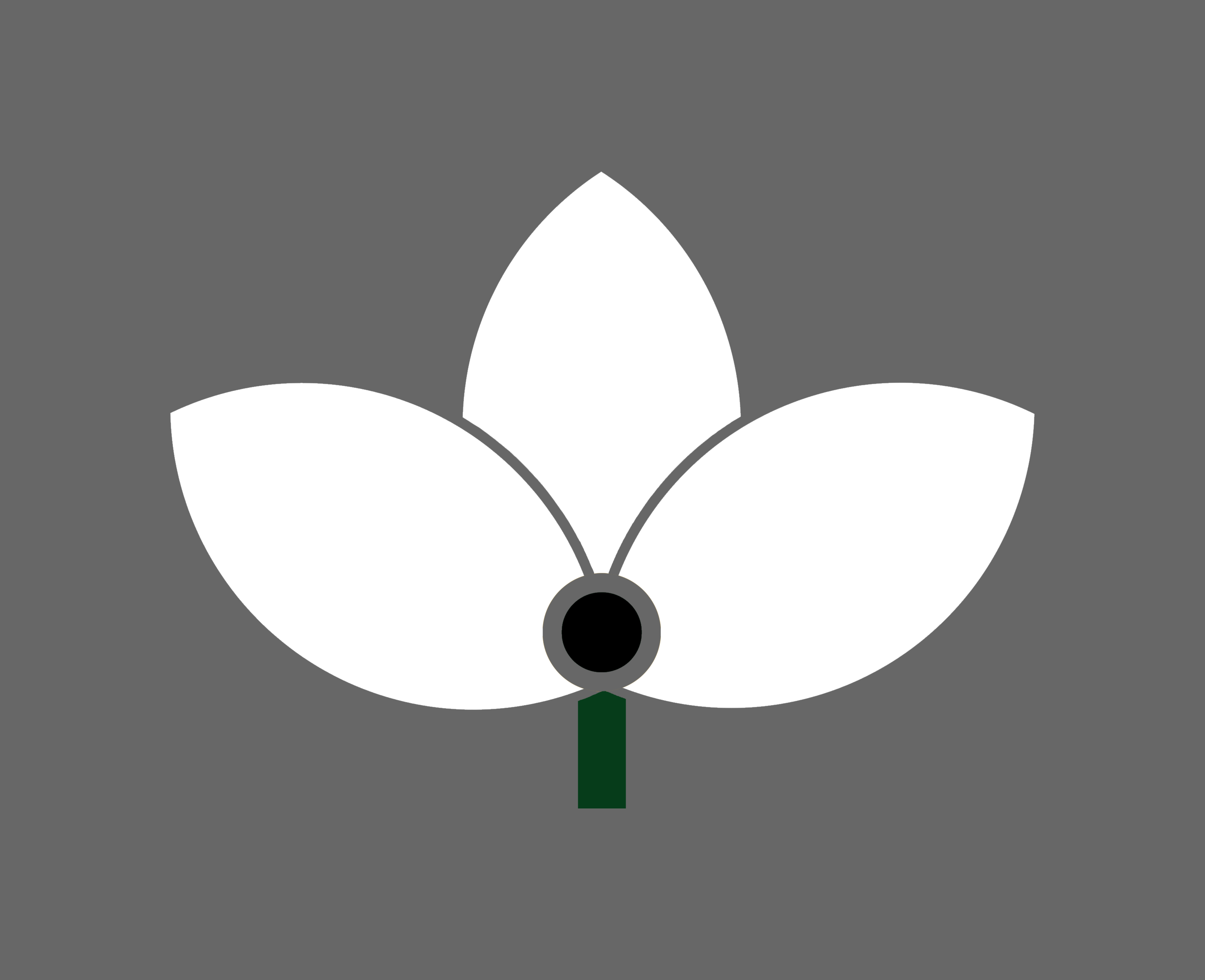
Symbol of Baloch Genocide

In this march, the Baloch Yakjehti Committee (BYC) organized an International Oppressed People Conference. Additionally, the BYC launched its inaugural booklet titled "Marching Beyond Silence, unveiling the courageous struggle against the Baloch Genocide." During the 5th phase of the march, a significant public gathering was held in Quetta, the capital of Balochistan. At this event, the BYC declared January 25th as the Day of Baloch Genocide and introduced the Baloch Genocide symbol.

== Response from authorities ==
The march saw resistance from authorities on its route to Islamabad. Two participants were severely injured by police at a checkpoint in Soorab. Obstacles were also put on roads by police in an attempt to stop the marchers.

=== Islamabad ===
The response from the authorities in Islamabad was marked by resistance and force. Police were dispatched to block China Chowk Underpass, Chongi No. 26, the Islamabad Chowk, Jinnah Avenue, Nazimuddin Road, and Srinagar Highway. The general public was also restricted from using these routes.

Despite the negotiations, the police refused to accept the demands of the protesters, resulting in a sit-in near Islamabad Chowk. Police also offered protesters the use of F-9 Park, but this was turned down, with the marchers saying they, not the police, would decide where the protest was staged. More than 200 protesters were subsequently arrested, while others were forcibly dispersed by police water cannons and tear gas.

The arrested protesters were briefly detained, before authorities began sending them back to Quetta on buses. Video of authorities forcibly putting some of the protesters on buses drew criticism on social media. The Islamabad High Court (IHC) later inquired why Baloch protesters in the federal capital were being "forcibly" sent back to their provinces.

== See also ==
- 2025 Balochistan protests
- Missing Baloch students case
- Mahrang Baloch
