= Deen Muhammad Baloch =

Missing Balochistan government employee

- Disappeared: June 28, 2009; Ornach, Khuzdar, Balochistan
- Status: missing
- Occupations: Government employee, Political activist
- Known for: Advocacy for Baloch national rights
- Title: Doctor

Deen Muhammad Baloch was a government employee in Balochistan who has been missing since 2009. He was also a political activist and a close associate of Chairman Ghulam Mohammed Baloch in the revival of non-parliamentary and libertarian politics. He was associated with the struggle for the national rights of Baloch.

== Disappearance ==
On the night of 28 June 2009, Deen Muhammad was forcibly disappeared from the hospital while on duty in Ornach, Khuzdar area. His family has tried to recover him by demanding from the judiciary, Pakistan's parliament, political parties and human rights organizations.

=== Family's struggle ===
His daughter Sammi Deen Baloch has been at the forefront of his recovery struggle. She has spent much of her time on the streets, in front of journalists' press clubs across Pakistan - photograph in hand, asking the question: "Where is my father? What is his crime?"

=== Protests and advocacy ===
The families of missing persons from Balochistan, including the family of Deen Muhammad Baloch, have held protests in different cities. They have demanded an end to enforced disappearances, the release of all Baloch missing persons and an investigation into the alleged fake encounter.

== Legal actions ==
Senior politician and lawyer Aitzaz Ahsan filed a petition in the Supreme Court against the practice of enforced disappearances. The petition highlighted the case of Deen Muhammad Baloch and disputed the figures stated by caretaker Prime Minister Anwarul Haq Kakar that there are 50 missing persons in Balochistan.

=== Government response ===
The government has assured that it is committed to reduce the number of cases of missing persons in the future and get rid of the scourge.
