= Missing Baloch students case =

Missing Baloch Students Case
- Court: Islamabad High Court (IHC)
- Decided: Ongoing

Court membership
- Judge sitting: Justice Mohsin Akhtar Kayani

Keywords
- Missing persons, Baloch students, Islamabad High Court, Pakistan

The Missing Baloch Students Case refers to a 2023 instance in Pakistan where more than 50 students from the Balochistan province were reported missing, allegedly due to state abduction, prompting judicial proceedings regarding their fate. The students are alleged to have been detained by Pakistani security agencies in the late 2010s and early 2020s, from their academic institutions, campus residences or from their families' homes. However, Pakistani security officials deny these claims.

The Islamabad High Court (IHC) was involved in the case, issuing directives for the recovery of the missing students.

== Background ==
According to The Diplomat, the Pakistani state has perceived of the Baloch minority in the southwestern Balochistan region as a security threat, suspecting many of them of holding an anti-state views or of ties to armed Baloch separatist movements. Instead of directly confronting the local armed Baloch groups, the Pakistani government is said to have preferred the tactic of selected detainment of individual Baloch citizens, aiming to deter them from joining the irredentist groups. In this context, the government harbors a great degree of suspicion towards Baloch students, whom it sees as a central driver of a particularistic Baloch identity. According to this report, since the early 2000s, authorities have increased surveillance, racial profiling and enforced disappearances of Baloch students at institutions across Pakistan, with some detainees never being released.

A Commission of Inquiry on Enforced Disappearances was established in 2011 to identify the whereabouts of missing Pakistani nationals and attribute responsibility for their disappearance. In November 2023, the IHC ordered Interim Prime Minister Anwaar ul Haq Kakar to appear in a case involving 50 missing Baloch students. The Court issued its directive to the Pakistani premier while it was in the process of adjudicating a case related to implementing the Commission's recommendations. Per the Court's determination, 69 students from Baloch were racially profiled, subjected to harassment and forcibly disappeared. While some of these students managed to return home, as of 25 November 2023 there were about 50 who remain unaccounted for. Several days later, Attorney General Mansoor Usman Awan informed the IHC that 22 of the 50 students had been recovered, whereas the locations of the remaining 28 students were unknown.

== Hafeez Baloch case ==
Abdul Hafeez Baloch, a Baloch student and a M.Phil candidate in physics at Quaid-e-Azam University in Islamabad, was allegedly subjected to racial profiling and an enforced disappearance. Baloch visited his hometown Khuzdar in the Balochistan Province in February 2022 and never returned to school in Islamabad. According to Baloch's father, three masked armed men abducted Hafeez from an academy where he had been teaching as a volunteer. The Baloch Students Council Islamabad (BSC Islamabad) staged a hunger strike for over a month demanding his safe return. Hafeez was eventually released, but Pakistani security forces reportedly filed fabricated terrorism charges against him, labelling him a potential militant. Hafeez fought the charges in court and maintained his innocence, with a Balochistan anti-terrorism court ultimately ordering his release on 30 June 2022.

Human rights groups had expressed concern over the process in Hafeez's detainment. The Human Rights Council of Balochistan condemned Hafeez's arrest, demanding the withdrawal of the fabricated First Information Report (FIR) and his immediate release. The incident had also led to accusations by the Baloch Students Council over racial profiling and harassment of Baloch students at Pakistani universities.

== Faseeh Baloch and Sohail Baloch case ==
Faseeh Baloch and Sohail Baloch, students at the University of Balochistan in Quetta, were reported missing in November 2021. Both students were allegedly abducted from the university campus 1 November 2021.The incident triggered a sit in by the Baloch Students Organization (BSO) and protests resulting in halting of academic activities for up to three weeks. Protests started on 7 November after the suspected enforced disappearance.

Negotiations between the students and the university administration took place on 9 November but reportedly failed to reach a solution. On 11 November, a government-formed committee met with the students, though with similarly inconclusive results. Subsequent negotiations also failed as the state had promised to recover the missing students by 16 November but failed to do so. As of November 2024, the two students remained missing. In Quetta, a protest led by the Baloch Students Action Committee took place on the third anniversary of their disappearance.

== Court proceedings and latest status ==
The Islamabad High Court (IHC), presided over by Justice Mohsin Akhtar Kayani, directed the interim Prime Minister Anwaarul Haq Kakar to present himself in court on 29 November 2023, unless he could facilitate the immediate return of the missing Baloch students. The court also called upon the interior, defence and human rights ministers to attend the hearing. The court expressed its dissatisfaction with the progress made by both the commission and the government.

Interim Prime Minister Kakar, after skipping two court summons on 14 and 19 February 2024, stated during the IHC proceedings (during the third summon) on 28 February 2024 that the state was "fighting an armed insurgency" in Balochistan to which, Justice Kayani responded saying that "no court is asking to protect non-state actors". According to the lawyer representing missing persons, Imaan Mazari, "whenever there is a discussion about missing persons it is drifted towards terrorists". The lawyer categorically stated that her clients do not support extremism and that the state authorities were indeed involved in the enforced disappearances according to the commission's findings. Prime Minister Kakar disagreed with the statements.

Separately, during the 14 February hearing, Assistant Attorney General Usman Ghuman additionally informed the court that one more student had been located and returned to his family.

== Government response ==
On 29 November 2023, Interim Interior Minister Sarfraz Bugti assured the Islamabad High Court (IHC) of his commitment to the recovery of the missing Baloch students. Interim Prime Minister Kakar stated that he would not be able to appear before the IHC in relation to the case of the missing Baloch students. He cited his attendance at the COP 28 conference in Dubai, UAE as the reason for his absence but assured that the government would ensure representation in other relevant forums.

== See also ==
- Baloch long march
