= Baloch National Front =

The Baloch National Front is a political alliance of eight Baloch nationalist groups, including the Baloch Students Organization (BSO) and Baloch National Movement (BNM).

The BNF was formed in February 2009. Ghulam Mohammed Baloch of the Baloch National Movement served as the Front's Secretary General until he was killed in April 2009. Currently Karima Baloch, the chairperson of Baloch Students Organization – Azad, is the Secretary of the Baloch National Front.
