= Langaw (tribe) =

Baloch tribe

Langaw (Balochi: لانگو), also spelled Langau or Langove, is a Baloch tribe present in Pakistani Balochistan, though other communities can be found in Punjab and Sindh. Langau’s are mostly Balochi-speaking but may also be Brahvi-speaking. Three important Langau subgroups are the Sardar khail, Halizai and Shadizai.

== People ==
- Mahrang Baloch (born 1993), Baloch political activist
