= Mama Qadeer =

Pakistani human rights activist (1940–2025)

Abdul Qadeer Baloch (Urdu: عبد القدیر بلوچ; 6 June 1940 – 20 December 2025), better known as Mama Qadeer (ماما قدیر), was a Pakistani human rights activist from the Balochistan province.

== Biography ==
In 2013, Qadeer travelled more than 2,000 kilometres from Balochistan to Islamabad along with other Baloch men and women to protest against the issue of Baloch missing persons. Qadeer's own son, Jaleel Reki Baloch, had been found dead in 2012.

In March 2015, Qadeer was barred from leaving the country from Karachi Airport at the last minute. He was travelling to New York City to participate in a human rights conference to highlight the plight of Baloch people and the issue of missing Baloch persons.

On 9 April 2015, Qadeer was scheduled to give a talk titled "Unsilencing Balochistan" in an event at the Lahore University of Management Sciences. The event was cancelled at the last minute by the administration citing "order from government" as the reason behind the cancellation. The incident was followed by protests from the students and faculty of the institute against the "academic censorship".

Following the cancellation, an event titled 'Unsilencing Balochistan Take 2: In Conversation with Mama Qadeer, Farzana Baloch and Mir Mohammad Ali Talpur' was held at T2F Karachi.

Later on, in September 2015, Mama Qadeer was allowed to leave Pakistan. After that he visited India in 2018. In an interview with Indian news channel, News 18, Mama Qadeer asked Indian government to provide them 'with weapons, so that they could kill their enemies'.

In the aftermath of the 2025 Jaffar Express hijacking, Qadeer claimed that over 200 security personnel were killed during the attack, without citing any evidence.

Qadeer died on 20 December 2025, at the age of 85.

== See also ==
- Insurgency in Balochistan
- Human rights in Pakistan
- Human rights violations in Balochistan
