= Mahrang Baloch =

Baloch political activist (born 1993)

- مهرنگ بلۏچ
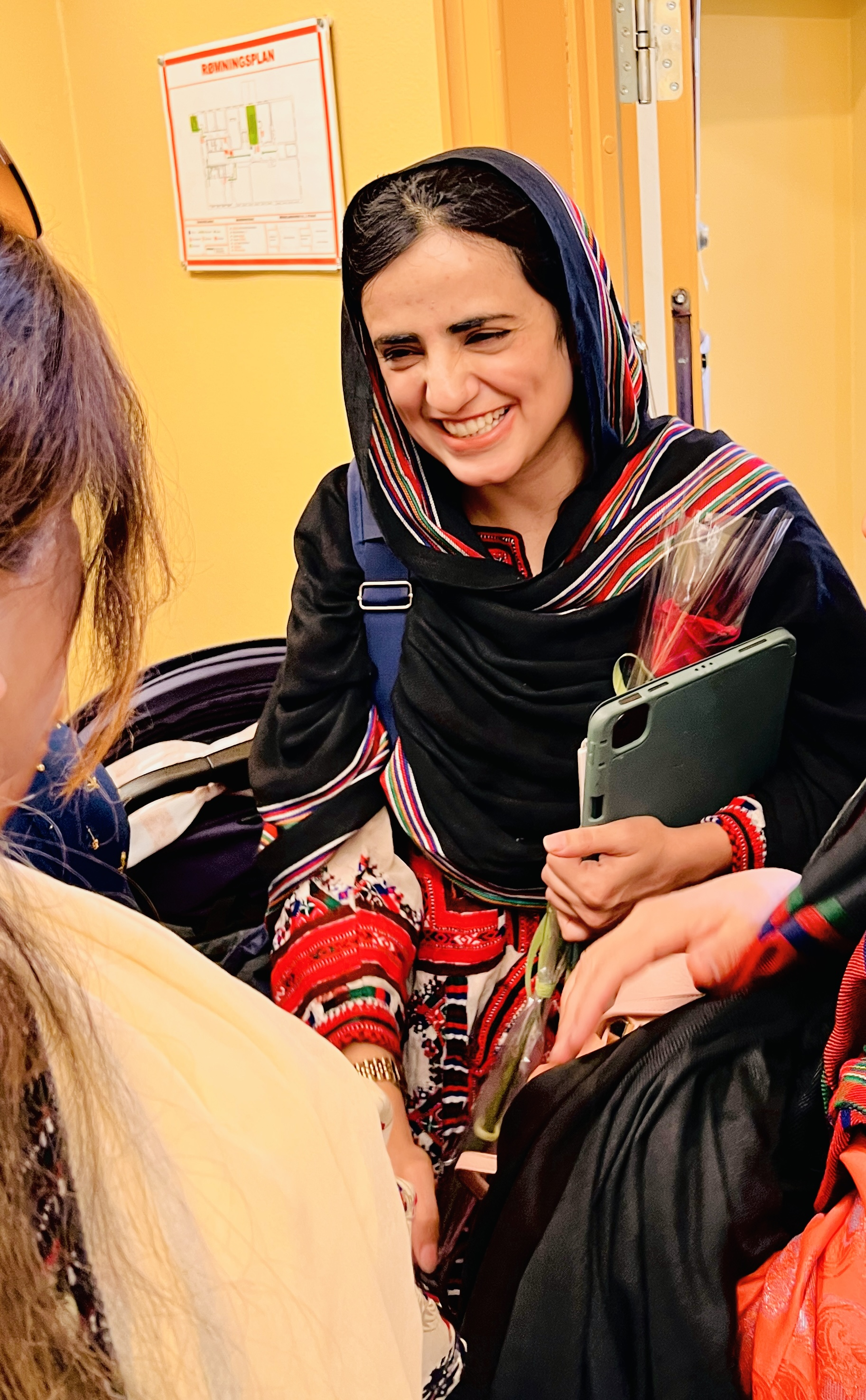
- Baloch in 2024
- Born: 1 January 1993 (age 33); Mangocher, Balochistan, Pakistan
- Education: MBBS
- Alma mater: Bolan Medical College
- Occupations: Doctor; Human rights activist
- Years active: 2009–present
- Organization: Baloch Yakjehti Committee
- Known for: Activism for the human rights of the Baloch people
- Criminal penalty: Life imprisonment (for murder)
- Criminal status: Convicted

Mahrang Baloch (Note: Balochi: مهرنگ بلۏچ, pronounced [meh.rəŋg bəl.oːt͡ʃ], Urdu: ماہ رنگ بلوچ, pronounced [mɑːh rəŋg bə.loːt͡ʃ]) (born 1 January 1993) is a Baloch political activist who is the founder and leader of the Baloch Yakjehti Committee (BYC). She is known for her campaigns against alleged enforced disappearances, extrajudicial killings, and other human rights abuses in Balochistan, Pakistan.

== Early life and education ==
Mahrang Baloch was born in 1993 in Mangocher into a Baloch family belonging to the Langove tribe. Her father, Abdul Ghaffar Langove, was a political activist who spoke out against human rights violations in Balochistan. She has a brother, Nasir Baloch, and several sisters, including Iqra Baloch.

Baloch is a physician, having earned her MBBS degree from Bolan Medical College in Quetta, Balochistan.

== Activism ==
On 11 December 2009, her father was detained by Pakistani security forces while travelling to hospital in Karachi, but was subsequently released. At the age of 16, she began protesting against his detention and became a prominent figure in the student activist movement. In July 2011, her father was reportedly detained again and was later found dead, with his body showing signs of torture.

In December 2017, her brother was also detained and subsequently released. Since then, she has become a leading figure in Baloch civil society, campaigning against alleged enforced disappearances and what she describes as the inequitable extraction of natural resources from Balochistan. In 2020, she led a student protest against the proposed removal of the quota system at Bolan Medical College, which reserves places for students from remote areas of the province. The proposed change was subsequently cancelled following sustained protests and hunger strikes by the group.

Baloch leads the Baloch Yakjehti Committee (BYC). On 28 July 2024, she participated in the Baloch Raji Muchi (Baloch National Gathering) in Gwadar, an event described as aimed at uniting the Baloch community in opposition to alleged abuses.

Her activism has drawn expressions of solidarity from prominent international figures. Climate activist Greta Thunberg posted a statement on social media in support of Baloch and other protesters who, she said, had been detained and harassed by Islamabad Police for speaking out against human rights violations in Balochistan. Nobel Peace Prize laureate Malala Yousafzai also expressed support, stating her backing for Baloch women demanding accountability for enforced disappearances and affirming their right to peaceful protest.

== Later developments ==
=== 2023 Baloch Long March ===
The Baloch Long March was a protest movement led by Baloch and other activists, predominantly women, affiliated with the Baloch Yakjehti Committee. Participants travelled from Turbat to Islamabad to protest human rights violations and enforced disappearances in Balochistan. According to the BYC, a number of protesters were detained by the Islamabad Police. Bail was subsequently approved for some participants, although media reports and lawyers indicated that a number of others remained unaccounted for.

=== 2024 Time magazine recognition and travel ban ===
In October 2024, Time magazine named Baloch among its TIME100 Next list of emerging influential figures, citing her advocacy against enforced disappearances and human rights violations in Balochistan. Shortly afterwards, she was prevented from travelling to New York City to attend a Time-related event. At Jinnah International Airport, she and Sammi Baloch reportedly encountered FIA officials who confiscated her passport and mobile phone. Her lawyer stated that the Government of Pakistan had placed her on the Pakistan National Identity List (PNIL), a registry for individuals suspected of involvement in offences such as terrorism, money laundering, and fraud, shortly after her inclusion in the Time list. The Human Rights Commission of Pakistan called for freedom of movement for Baloch, while Mary Lawlor, the UN Special Rapporteur on Human Rights Defenders, expressed concern about reported harassment and mistreatment.

==== Terrorism allegations ====
On 11 October 2024, an anti-terrorism case was filed against Baloch at Malir's Qaidabad police station by a local businessman, who alleged she had incited violence in the area. The station house officer was reportedly unable to confirm any such activities by Baloch or her associates. Baloch denied the charges, describing them as politically motivated.

=== 2025 arrest ===
On 22 March 2025, Baloch was arrested during a police raid on a sit-in protest in Quetta. The Balochistan government accused her and other BYC leaders of orchestrating an attack on Quetta Civil Hospital and inciting violence, following a protest in which demonstrators allegedly demanded the return of the bodies of those killed during the military operation connected to the 2025 Jaffar Express hijacking. According to a police report, protesters entered the hospital and forcibly removed the bodies of militants.

Baloch and her supporters have disputed the government's account, asserting that the demonstrations were peaceful and that the charges are politically motivated. Human rights organisations have also contested the allegations.

In July 2025, she was brought before an Anti-Terrorism Court in Quetta, which granted police a ten-day physical remand. On 18 July, the remand was extended for a further fifteen days; she has since remained under remand on multiple occasions.

In October 2025, the BYC reported that proceedings against Baloch and other group leaders were to be conducted inside Quetta District Jail rather than in an open Anti-Terrorism Court, a development the organisation described as an instance of "institutionalised repression". Several lawyers and human rights observers raised concerns about due process.

==== International condemnation ====
The arrest drew condemnation from international human rights organisations and prominent public figures, including Malala Yousafzai and the UN Special Rapporteur on Human Rights Defenders, both of whom called for her immediate release.

On 26 March 2025, a group of independent United Nations human rights experts issued a statement expressing concern over Baloch's detention. They criticised Pakistani authorities for allegedly using arbitrary detention, enforced disappearances, and excessive force against peaceful protesters, and called for the immediate release of those detained, urging the government not to apply counter-terrorism measures against human rights activists.

==== Conditions of detention ====
Following her arrest on 22 March 2025, Baloch was held at Hudda District Prison. Her family and legal team reported that she was held in isolation, denied access to legal counsel, and that food brought by relatives was refused by authorities. Her sister, Nadia Baloch, stated that Baloch appeared unwell during a brief family visit. Her lawyer, Imran Baloch, alleged that the state had intensified its actions against her following her inclusion in the TIME100 Next list and her nomination for the 2025 Nobel Peace Prize.

==== Conviction and sentencing ====
On 22 June 2026, an anti-terrorism court in Quetta found Mahrang Baloch guilty in the murder case of Frontier Corps (FC) soldier Shabbir Ahmad Baloch, who was beaten to death during violence that erupted at a BYC-led protest in Gwadar that she and another BYC leader reportedly incited in July 2024. She was sentenced to life imprisonment by the court along with Sibghatullah Shah, another BYC leader. Mahrang Baloch issued a statement via her lawyer. Her lawyer, Israr Jattak, stated at her behest that the court was "using the law as a weapon" against them. "The court and the judicial system exposed themselves through this judgment", he said. The Human Rights Commission of Pakistan urged a review of the ruling, stating that the state had "continued its policy of treating fundamental rights advocacy in the same way it treats extremism, resulting in administrative and judicial decisions that are one-sided and biased."

== Awards and recognition ==
In October 2024, Time magazine included Baloch in its TIME100 Next list, which recognises emerging figures across a range of fields.

In December 2024, she was included in the BBC's 100 Women list.

In March 2025, Baloch confirmed via X that she had been nominated for the Nobel Peace Prize in 2025.
