= Human rights abuses in Balochistan =

Organized abuse and breaches of fundamental human rights in Balochistan, Pakistan

- Part of the Insurgency in Balochistan
- Balochistan shown within Pakistan (hatched regions indicate claimed but not controlled territories)
- Location: Balochistan, Pakistan
- Date: 1948–present
- Target: Civilians and combatants
- Perpetrator: Combatants on either side of the conflict

The Pakistani province of Balochistan has been accused of practicing human rights violations amidst the ongoing insurgency in Balochistan. The situation has drawn concern from the international community. The human rights situation in Balochistan is credited to the long-running conflict between Baloch nationalists (as well as Baloch terrorist groups such as the Balochistan Liberation Army) and Pakistan Armed Forces.

Brad Adams, director of the HRW Asia Branch, said that the Pakistani government has not done enough to stop the widespread human rights abuses in the region, which include torture, forced disappearances of those suspected of either terrorism or opposition to the Pakistani military, ill treatment of captured combatants or criminals, and extrajudicial killings. Separatist militants have also committed widespread abuse. According to Human Rights Watch (HRW), Baloch separatist militants are responsible for several attacks on schools, teachers, and students in the province with the aim of ethnically cleansing the province.

As of 2018, per The New York Times, the Pakistani deep-state was using Islamist militants to attack Baloch separatists. Academics and journalists in the United States have been approached by Inter-Services Intelligence (ISI) spies, who warned them not to speak about the insurgency in Balochistan or human rights abuses committed by the Pakistan Army, while also threatening to harm them or their families should they continue to investigate the conflict.

== Background ==
Before joining Pakistan, Balochistan consisted of four princely states: Makran, Las Bela, Kharan, and Kalat. Three of these, Makran, Las Bela, and Kharan willingly joined Pakistan in 1947 during the dissolution of the British Indian Empire. However, Kalat, led by the Khan of Kalat, Ahmed Yaar Khan, chose independence as this was one of the options given to all of the princely states by Clement Attlee at the time. Muhammad Ali Jinnah persuaded Yar Khan to accept Pakistani rule but the Khan stalled for time. After a period of negotiations, Khan finally decided to accede to Pakistan on 27 March 1948. The Khan's brother Prince Kareem Khan declared independence and fled to Afghanistan to seek aid and begin an armed struggle that failed. By June 1948, Baluchistan in whole became a part of Pakistan.

There were a further three insurgencies in the region after 1948: 1958–1959, 1962–1963, and 1973–1977, and a fifth nationalistic movement which began in 2002. The 1958–1959 conflict was caused by the imposition of the One Unit plan which had been implemented in 1955. This led to further resistance, and by 1957 Nauroz Khan announced his intention to secede; Pakistan declared martial law one day later. Pakistan bombed separatist hideouts and deployed tanks with support from artillery. Nauroz was arrested and died while in prison; his family members were hanged for treason. According to Dan Slater, pro-independence feelings in East Pakistan and Balochistan increased in parity with continuing military intervention in the political arena.

== Missing persons ==
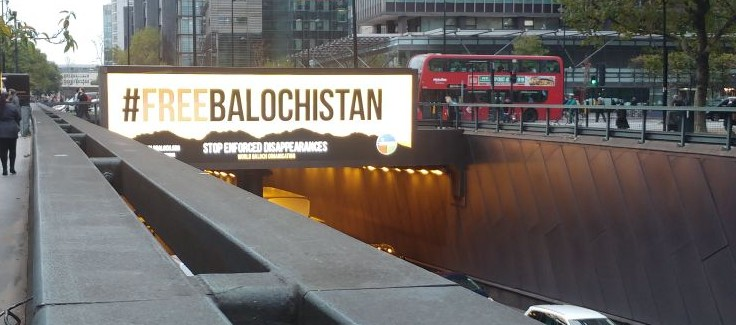
Poster against forced disappearances in Balochistan in London, UK

According to journalist Ahmed Rashid writing in 2014, estimates of the number of disappeared in Balochistan "are between hundreds and several thousand." According to Voice for Baloch Missing Persons (VBMP) around 5,228 Baloch have gone missing from 2001 to 2017. While according to a 8 December 2005, statement by the then Pakistani interior minister Aftab Sherpao, an estimated 4,000 people from Balochistan were in the custody of the authorities having been detained in the province between 2002–2005. Of this number only 200 were taken to court and the rest were being held incommunicado according to author Manan Dwivedi writing in 2009.

In December 2018, Balochistan National Party (Mengal) (BNP-M) leader, Akhtar Mengal presented a list of 5,000 missing persons to the newly formed government of Imran Khan. BNP-M leaders claim that there has been a noticeable decline in enforced disappearances since BNP-M's agreement with Pakistan Tehreek-e-Insaf (PTI). BNP-M also claims that hundreds of alleged victims have been reunited with their families.

A senior Pakistani provincial security official claims that missing person figures are 'exaggerated', that 'in Balochistan, insurgents, immigrants who fled to Europe, and even those who have been killed in military operations are declared as missing persons'. Reports have shown that many people have fled the province to seek asylum in other countries because of the unrest caused by separatist militants.

Pakistani authorities have acknowledged that disappearances happen. In 2011, the government established a commission which registered 5,369 missing persons complaints. The commission claims to have traced more than 3,600 people.

On 3 June 2012, Prime Minister Syed Yusuf Raza Gilani directed Balochistan's chief minister to take special measures to trace the missing persons.

In October 2018, Balochistan National Party (Mengal) (BNP-M) claimed that around 300 missing persons had returned to their homes. Similarly in January 2019, Voice for Baloch Missing Persons (VBMP) decided to suspend their protest after dozens of missing people returned to their homes. VBMP gave a list of 110 missing people which the VBMP expects the government to recover within two months.

In 2016, based on government documents obtained by the BBC, nearly 1,000 dead bodies of suspected armed militants and political activists have been found in Balochistan from 2010 - 2016. The government states that the dumped bodies include those of insurgent groups who died fighting amongst each other. Activists said that the figures point to large-scale extrajudicial killings. As of 8 December 2005, the federal Interior Minister announced that approximately 4,000+ individuals had been apprehended in Balochistan since the start of that year. However, the identities, whereabouts, and charges against a significant number of these detainees remain undisclosed.

According to Baloch activists, at least 504 people were killed extrajudicially in the province in 2023 itself.

== Abuses by Baloch insurgents ==
Baloch insurgent movements have also been accused by the Human Rights Organisation of grave human rights abuses in Balochistan, including targeted killings of ethnic non-Baloch civilians. This has caused an economic brain drain in the province. According to the Chief Minister of Balochistan, Nawab Aslam Raisani, "a large number of professors, teachers, engineers, and barbers are leaving the province for fear of attacks. This inhuman act will push the Baloch nation at least one century back. The Baloch nation will never forgive whoever is involved in target killings." Raisani noted that these immigrant settlers had been living in Balochistan for centuries and called their targeting by Baloch insurgents "a crime against humanity".

Journalists, teachers, students, and human rights defenders have been targeted in Balochistan according to the South Asia Terrorism Portal. According to Human Rights Watch (HRW), Baloch Separatist militants are responsible for attacks on schools, teachers, and students in the province. As a result, many teachers have sought transfer to secure areas such Quetta or have moved out of the province entirely. Moreover, Separatist groups have also claimed responsibility for killing Journalists in the province.

Human Right Organisation have held Balochistan Liberation Army (BLA) responsible for ethnic cleansing in the province as Brahamdagh Bugti (alleged leader of BLA), during a TV interview on 15 April 2009, urged separatists to kill non-Baloch residing in Balochistan. His actions allegedly lead to the death of 500 non-Baloch citizens in the province. More than 100,000 Punjabis have reportedly been killed or forced to flee Balochistan as a result of sustained targeted killings.

Apart from Human Right Organisations, Baloch separatists themselves have accused each other of being involved in human rights violations. Separatists accuse each other of being involved in extortion, kidnapping, and even raping local Baloch.

The U.S. Department of State estimates that in 2012 at least 690 civilians were victims of violence in Balochistan. A report from the Interior Ministry in 2012 stated that Lashkar-e-Jhangvi, Lashkar-e-Balochistan, Baloch Musalla Difa Tanzeem, and the Baloch Liberation Army were involved in violent disturbances. The Human Rights Commission of Pakistan estimates that these groups and others killed 2,050 innocent persons and injured another 3,822 in 2012.

== Military and paramilitary abuses ==
The Frontier Corps (FC), Inter-Services Intelligence (ISI) agency, and other groups have been accused of "a decade-long campaign" of "pick up and dump" in which "Baloch nationalists, militants, or even innocent bystanders are picked up, disappeared, tortured, mutilated, and then killed". Pakistan's Inter-Services Intelligence (ISI) agency has been accused of massive human rights abuses in Balochistan by Human Rights Watch, with the enforced disappearance of hundreds of nationalists and activists. In 2008 alone, an estimated 1102 people were disappeared from the region. There have also been reports of torture. An increasing number of bodies are being found on roadsides, having been shot in the head. In July 2011, the Human Rights Commission of Pakistan issued a report on illegal disappearances in Balochistan which identified ISI and Frontier Corps as the perpetrators. According to journalist Malik Siraj Akbar, as of May 2015, "dozens of people are losing their lives every day" in "extra judicial killings committed by the Pakistani security forces" in the province of Balochistan. However, Pakistan security officials have rejected all allegations against them.

In a 2012 statement to the Supreme Court of Pakistan, the Pakistani government denied allegations of the use of secret operations or death squads in Balochistan. Major General Obaid Ullah Khan Niazi, commander of the 46,000 paramilitary Frontier Corps (FC) stationed in Balochistan, claimed that "militants are using FC uniforms to kidnap people and malign our good name." Similarly, Baloch separatist militants have also been found using military uniforms which resemble the ones used by Frontier Corps while carrying out their activities.

Balochistan's former chief minister, Sardar Akhtar Jan Mengal, in a statement to the Supreme Court, claimed that the current civil disturbances in Balochistan were a direct result of "enforced disappearances".

On 25 May 2025, Farhatullah Babar, head of the Pakistan People's Party Human Rights Committee, commented on the state's crackdown on the Baloch Yakjehti Committee (BYC), stating that in several cases, individuals killed during military operations and later identified through DNA testing were found to be among those previously reported as missing. The Baloch Yakjehti Committee (BYC) alleged that police and personnel from intelligence agencies raided the Karachi residence of its central leader, Sami Deen Baloch, late on a Sunday night. The committee claimed the operation involved forced entry, property damage, and the seizure of personal belongings.

== Religious persecution of minorities ==
According to the Human Rights Commission of Pakistan (HRCP) and Al Jazeera, there has been a surge in religious extremism in Balochistan, with banned terrorist organizations such as Lashkar-i-Jhangvi and Pakistani Taliban targeting Hindus, Shias (including Hazaras), and Zikris, resulting in the migration of over 210,000 Shias, Zikris, and Hindus from Baluchistan to other parts of Pakistan. A further 90,000 ethnic Punjabis have also fled and been killed due to campaigns against Punjabis by Balochi militants.

The Baloch Liberation Front has also targeted Zikris in the province.

=== Hindus ===
In 2005, 32 Hindus were killed by shots fired from the government side near Nawab Akbar Bugti's residence during bloody clashes between Bugti tribesmen and paramilitary forces. The shooting left the Hindu residential locality near Bugti's residence badly hit.

=== Shia ===
Shia Muslims of various ethnic backgrounds make up at least 20% of the total population of Pakistan. The Hazara ethnic minority has been facing discrimination in Balochistan Province for a long time, and violence perpetrated against the community has risen sharply in recent years. Since the year 2000, over 2000 Shia Hazara community members, including many women and children, have been killed or injured in Quetta. Most of them have been the victims of terrorist attacks by Lashkar-e-Jhangvi and Sipah-e-Sahaba Pakistan, which is a Sunni Muslim militant organization affiliated with Al-Qaeda and Taliban. Repression against the Shi'ite Muslims began in 1998 with the assassination of Gen Musa Khan's son Hassan Musa in Karachi, and worsened in Pakistan after the 11 September attacks and the expulsion of the Taliban from Afghanistan.

Shias have also been targeted by Baloch Separatist militants. Shia pilgrims passing through the rigid terrain of Balochistan are common targets for Baloch separatists. Shias are targeted mainly because they are not ethnically Baloch. Moreover, it is reported that the Balochistan Liberation Army had formed an alliance with Tehrik-i-Taliban Pakistan. Tehrik-i-Taliban Pakistan is another terrorist group known for their attacks against Shia Muslims.

In 2003, 53 people died and 150 were critically injured in a suicide attack on the main Shia Friday mosque in Quetta. On 2 March 2004, at least 42 persons were killed and more than 100 wounded when a procession of Shia Muslims was attacked by Sunni extremists at Liaquat Bazaar in Quetta. On 7 October 2004, a car bomb killed 40 members of an extremist Sunni organization in Multan. 300 people died during 2006. On 28 December 2009, as many as 40 Shias were killed in an apparent suicide bombing in Karachi. The bomber attacked a Shia procession which was held to mark Ashura.

Many youth from the Hazara community have had to flee to Europe and Australia, often illegally, in order to escape the oppression.

== International reactions ==
The US government has expressed alarm at the reports of thousands Baloch separatists and Taliban insurgents disappearing at the hands of Pakistan's security forces and possibly being tortured or killed. A 2010 State Department report said that the Pakistani government made "limited progress" in advancing human rights. Member of the European Parliament Marc Tarabella, in an article in The Parliament Magazine in 2015, wrote, "The main victims of this violence are the people of Balochistan who are being systematically targeted by paramilitary groups, allegedly sponsored by the Pakistani authorities. Extra-judicial killings and enforced disappearances are the most common practices".

During an all-party meeting in Delhi, Indian prime minister Narendra Modi said that Pakistan "shall have to answer to the world for the atrocities committed by it against people in Baluchistan." Modi's remarks came during the backdrop of the unrest in Indian-administered Jammu and Kashmir, a territory disputed between both countries, where Pakistan condemned India for the human rights abuses in Jammu and Kashmir. Former President of Afghanistan Hamid Karzai, also interviewed by the press while in India, appreciated Modi for his comments on Balochistan, and said that, "In Balochistan there is extreme suffering at the hands of extremists promoted by state structures in Pakistan. Therefore the people's concerns need to be addressed and aired." Pakistan's foreign policy adviser Sartaj Aziz said Modi's statement was "self-incriminating", vindicating Pakistani accusations of Indian intelligence involvement in Balochistan's insurgency, and called it an attempt to divert attention from the Kashmir violence. In the 33rd session of the United Nations Human Rights Council, India raised the issue of human rights abuses in Baluchistan, saying that "the people of Balochistan, amongst other provinces, have been waging for decades a bitter and brave struggle against their daily abuse and torture."According to a report by the European Union, there has been a high and growing number of enforced disappearance cases in Pakistan, particularly in Balochistan and Khyber Pakhtunkhwa, alongside reports of extrajudicial killings.

== See also ==
- Insurgency in Balochistan
- Human rights in Pakistan
- List of journalists killed during the Balochistan conflict (1947–present)
