= Voice for Baloch Missing Persons =

- Abbreviation: VBMP
- Founded: 27 October 2009; 16 years ago
- Type: Nonprofit INGO
- Headquarters: Quetta, Balochistan, Pakistan
- Location: Global
- Services: Protecting human rights
- Fields: Legal advocacy, Media attention, direct-appeal campaigns, research, lobbying
- General Secretary: Hooran Baloch
- Chairperson: Nasrullah Baloch
- Vice Chairperson: Mama Qadeer

The Voice for Baloch Missing Persons (VBMP) is a non-governmental organization which represents family members of people who have been subject to enforced disappearance in Pakistan's province of Balochistan.

VBMP records data on enforced disappearances; releases press statements; organises protests, rallies, and hunger strike camps; and facilitates the submission of first information reports and cases to Pakistani police stations and courts. Its Chairperson is Nasrullah Baloch and its Vice Chairperson is Mama Qadeer, while its General Secretary is Sammi Deen Baloch. It alleges that people are disappeared by Pakistan's security agencies, including the Pakistan Army, the Frontier Corps, and its various intelligence agencies including Inter-Services Intelligence and Military Intelligence (Pakistan). The VBMP calls for a political rather than military or violent solution to the low-level insurgency in Pakistan's province of Balochistan.

The Commission of Inquiry on Enforced Disappearances (COIOED) was set up by the Government of Pakistan to investigate, trace, and prosecute on behalf of "such persons as has been picked up/taken into custody by any Law Enforcing/Intelligence Agency, working under the civilian or military control, in a manner which is contrary to the provisions of the law". In January 2018, it said that only 1,532 cases of enforced disappearances were pending, of which only 125 cases were from Balochistan.

== History of the VBMP ==
Though the VBMP was formally founded on 27 October 2009, but its members have been active since the first known enforced disappearance, that of Ali Asghar Bangulzai in Balochistan in 2000. Ali Asghar Bangulzai was abducted in 2000 for 14 days and then released; he was abducted against in 2001 and remains missing to this day. Nasrullah Baloch supports the efforts of his family to find his uncle, Ali Asghar Bangulzai.

The VBMP takes responsibility for pushing the Supreme Court of Pakistan to order that police stations issue First Information Reports demanded by families of the missing in 2010. In the same period, the VBMP was pushing the Supreme Court of Pakistan to take "suo motu" notice of missing persons in Balochistan.

In 2011, the mutilated body of Jalil Rekhi, the son of VBMP Vice Chairperson Mama Qadeer was found, "with bullet wounds and cigarette burns." Rekhi was abducted in 2009.

On 1 April 2011, VBMP Chairperson Nasrullah Baloch said that 121 bodies had been recovered in just eight months. At the same press conference, he announced hunger strike camps; he also said that he had a list of 1,300 Baloch missing persons.

In 2012, the current head of the Government Commission Retired Justice Javed Iqbal conducted three days of hearings on Balochistan's missing persons but declared that the government agencies were not involved in abduction and enforced disappearances.

On 18 September 2012, VBMP Chairperson Nasrullah Baloch said that he was receiving threats.

On 12 September 2013, the Pakistani newspaper Dawn reported that they had received documentation from the home and tribal affairs department of the province of Balochistan that 592 mutilated bodies had been found around the province. The VBMP said that the numbers were under-reported. Dawn also reported that another 132 cases were pending before the Supreme Court and the Commission of Inquiry on Enforced Disappearances.

On 31 December 2013, the VBMP Chairperson Nasrullah Baloch said that 161 Baloch workers were subjected to extrajudicial killings across the province. He also said that 510 "Baloch political workers" were picked up by the "secret services". The provincial home and tribal affairs denied the accusation, saying that the numbers were lower than those claimed by the VBMP. The VBMP Chairperson also said that Balochistan's Frontier Corps chief was issued a contempt notice by the Supreme Court over the issue of missing persons.

At the end of 2013, Justice Hani Irfan Muslim, a member of a two-member bench of the Supreme Court of Pakistan hearing cases of Baloch missing persons, called for security to be given to the VBMP chairperson, Nasrullah Baloch. The march began late October, 2013.

In June 2014, mass graves were discovered in Tootak, Khuzdar. Chief Justice Tassadug Hussain Jilani eventually took sou motu notice, directing the Inspector General of Balochistan to look into the discovery of mutilated bodies.

On 1 April 2014, the Asian Human Rights Commission put out an Urgent Appeal Case warning of threats against VBMP Chairperson Nasrullah Baloch. According to the appeal, Nasrullah Baloch had been receiving threats for over a year from unknown persons claiming to be from Pakistan's Inter-Services Intelligence.

In 2014, the VBMP led a historic "long march" from its capital of Quetta down through Karachi, up through Punjab and Lahore and ending up in Pakistan's capital of Islamabad.

In January 2015, the Supreme Court of Pakistan directed the federal government to come up with a list of missing persons after an application from VBMP.

In 2016, the BBC reported that over 1000 mutilated bodies had been found in Balochistan. The VBMP Chairperson, Nasrullah Baloch, said that most of those disappeared were activists.

On April 7, 2016, the VBMP appealed in court for review of the decision about the disposal of missing person's case that was accepted for hearing. The VBMP said that the practice of abduction and the dumping of mutilated bodies was continuing at the same pace.

On 11 September 2017, the VBMP Chairman Nasrullah Baloch and the Vice Chairman Mama Abdul Qadeer Baloch urged human rights organisations to establish a joint force on the issue of missing persons. VBMP Chairperson Nasrullah Baloch also said that 41 cases had been sent to the Supreme Court of Pakistan with the consent of families of the missing.

On 16 January 2019, Dawn reported that the VBMP suspended its hunger strike camp for the first time in 10 years, for a period of 2 months, after assurances from the provincial government that steps would be taken to return those who have been forcibly disappeared.

On 24 June 2019, retired Justice Fazlur Rehman Bazai started hearing cases in Balochistan of missing persons over the course of "nine consecutive hearings" that took up 122 cases.

On 29 June 2019, Balochistan's Home Minister Mir Ziaullah Langove revealed that 200 Baloch missing persons returned home after 1 January 2019, though the Chairperson of the VBMP Nasrullah Baloch put the number far lower, at 103 missing persons. In a news report on 31 December 2018, VBMP Chairperson said he provided a list of 110 missing persons to the provincial government. Six months later, it was reported that the VBMP provided Langove and the provincial government a list of 250 missing persons alongside the 40 cases that were already being heard in a commission set up in Quetta.

According to the Chairperson of the VBMP, Nasrullah Baloch, groups of missing persons started returning home in the summer of 2019. On 3 July 2019, Pakistan's Dawn newspaper reported that 12 people had returned over the preceding 9 days to various homes around Balochistan. This took place during hearings in Balochistan's capital of Quetta, by retired Justice Fazlur Rehman Bazai.

In early 2022, a group of activists from VBMP, including Gulzar Dost, completed a 776 kilometre walk from Turbat to Quetta, taking inspiration from Qadeer's own walk from Quetta to Islamabad in 2014, to raise awareness of enforced disappearances in Balochistan.

In November 2025, VBMP marked '6000 days' of protest in front of the Quetta Press Club. They claimed that despite years of complaints and testimonies, there was no "consistent accountability".

The United Nations, the Human Rights Commission of Pakistan, Human Rights Watch, and Amnesty International have condemned enforced disappearances in Balochistan.
