= Ghulam Mohammed Baloch =

Pakistani politician

- غلام محمد بلوچ
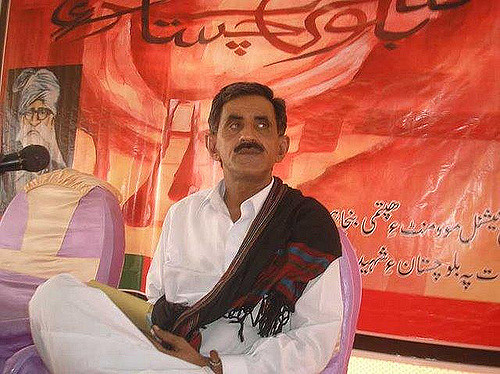
- Born: Ghulam Mohammed; 1 January 1959; Soro, Mand
- Died: 9 April 2009 (aged 50); Murgaap, Kech
- Cause of death: Assassination
- Occupation: Politician
- Era: 1959-2009
- Organization: Baloch National Movement
- Known for: Political activism for Baloch rights
- Title: Chairman
- Political party: Baloch National Movement
- Children: Five

Ghulam Mohammed Baloch (Balochi: غلام محمد بلوچ) was a Baloch nationalist politician. At the time of his assassination in 2009, he was serving as the president of the Baloch National Movement, as well as the General Secretary of the newly formed Baloch National Front. He had earlier served as a chairman of the Baloch Students Organization. His dead body was discovered on 9 April 2009, five days after being detained by gunmen who were believed to be Pakistani Law enforcement officers. The killing led to riots around Balochistan. He had been detained several times in the past by Pakistani intelligence agencies due to his political activities.

== Early life and family ==
Ghulam Mohammed Baloch was born on 1 January 1959, in Soro, Mand, the hometown of classical Balochi poet Mullah Fazul, in district Kech of Balochistan. He was the son of Mohammed Ayub and Khair ul Nissah. He received his early education from Mand High School in his hometown and later graduated from SM College, Karachi, in 1984.

Ghulam Mohammed Baloch was married twice. He has a daughter and two sons from his first wife, Najma, and a son and a daughter from his second wife, Salma.

== Politics ==
Ghulam Mohammed Baloch first entered politics during his school years under the patronage of his mentor Fida Ahmad Baloch, a legendary leader of the Baloch Students Organization who happened to be a teacher at Mand High School. Ghulam Mohammed Baloch joined the Baloch Students Organization in 1974. In 1990, he was elected as its chairman.

In 1992, he joined the Balochistan National Movement. In 2004, he founded the Baloch National Movement saying that he did not see a future for the Baloch within the framework of Pakistan. Although he advocated for an independent Balochistan throughout his political career, he was regarded as the face of the renewed movement for a separate Baloch homeland which started after 2002. For this, he was imprisoned by the Pakistani security forces on a number of occasions. He was first arrested by the Pakistan army on 3 December 2006, from Karachi during a public gathering. He was held incommunicado for around a year before being shifted to a jail in Turbat in 2007. He was later released. He was subjected to severe mental and physical torture during his enforced disappearance which impaired his eyesight and listening faculties.

== Death ==
On 3 April 2009, Ghulam Mohammed Baloch along with two other Baloch politicians were kidnapped by Persian (a national language of neighbouring Afghanistan and Iran) speaking gunmen from baloch's lawyer chamber in Turbat, Balochistan. Their bullet-riddled bodies were found on 9 April 2009, in Murgaap, Turbat. Baloch Liberation Army, a nationalist group, alleged that Pakistani security forces are behind the murder of the three politicians.

His assassination sparked small protests and riots throughout Balochistan and Karachi.

== See also ==
- Balochistan conflict
- Deen Muhammad Baloch

== Bibliography ==
- Amirali, Alia (2015), Rita Manchanda (ed.), SAGE Series in Human Rights Audits of Peace Processes, Volume III: Balochistan: A Case Study of Pakistan's Peacemaking Praxis, SAGE Publications, ISBN 978-93-5150-213-5
