= Sammi Baloch =

Baloch human rights activist (born 2000)

Sammi Deen (also known as Sammi Deen Baloch / Sammi Baloch)
- سمی دین بلۏچ
- Born: 25 February 2000 (age 26); Balochistan
- Education: Bachelors in Media Science
- Occupation: Human rights activist
- Organization(s): Baloch Yakjehti Committee (BYC); Voice for Baloch Missing Persons (VBMP)
- Known for: Human rights activism
- Father: Deen Muhammad Baloch
- Awards: Front Line Defenders Award (2024)

Sammi Deen Baloch (Balochi: سمی دین بلۏچ) is a leader of the Baloch Yakjehti Committee (BYC). She serves as the General Secretary of Voice for Baloch Missing Persons (VBMP). Over the last 15 years, Sammi has been a prominent advocate for the rights of Baloch people, including the case of her father, Deen Muhammad Baloch, and other missing individuals from Balochistan.

Her advocacy has drawn attention to enforced disappearances, extrajudicial killings, and other human rights abuses in Balochistan. In recognition of her efforts, she was honored with the Front Line Defenders Award 2024 in Ireland.

In July 2024, Sammi, along with Sabiha Baloch and other members of the BYC, was arrested during the Baloch Raji Muchi protests in Gwadar, where security forces killed three protesters and injured dozens.

== Activism ==
Sammi is involved in advocating against enforced disappearances in Balochistan by law enforcement agencies. She walked from Quetta to Islamabad in 2014, demanding the safe release of her father, Dr. Deen Muhammad, and other missing individuals. Since then, she has played a key role in the Baloch resistance movement, addressing issues such as enforced disappearances, extrajudicial killings, and human rights violations in Balochistan by Pakistani institutions.

Sammi Baloch has been honored with the Asia Pacific Human Rights Award for 2024, presented by Front Line Defenders. The award ceremony took place in Dublin, Ireland.

On 8 September 2024, Sammi was barred from leaving the country while she was about to travel from Pakistan to Oman. She was placed on the Exit Control List (ECL) by authorities. According to Baluch, no specific reason was provided for the travel restriction, and is believed that she was stopped due to her human rights activism in Balochistan.

In October 2025, Sammi was among 32 Baloch activists named as "proscribed individuals" under the Fourth Schedule of the Anti-Terrorism Act.
