= Bolan University of Medical & Health Sciences =

Medical school in Quetta, Pakistan

Bolan University of Medical and Health Sciences
- د بولان د طبي او روغتیايي علومو پوهنتون دانشگاه علوم پزشکی و بهداشتی درمانی بولان . جامع علوم طبی و صحی بولان
- Former name: Bolan Medical College
- Type: Public
- Established: 1972; 54 years ago
- Chancellor: Governor of Balochistan
- Vice-Chancellor: Shabeer Ahmed Lehri
- Undergraduates: 179
- Location: Quetta-87300, Balochistan, Pakistan
- Website: www.bumhs.edu.pk

Bolan University of Medical and Health Sciences is a medical university located in Quetta, Balochistan, Pakistan.

== History ==
Bolan Medical College was established in 1972 during the tenure of Chief Minister Ataullah Mengal, with support from the Education Minister Mir Gul Khan Nasir. Both of them were part of the National Awami Party (Wali group). By around 2003, the college had produced over 2,900 graduates. In 1995, it received a grant of 488 million yen from the Japan International Cooperation Agency, leading to the opening of a new building in 1996.

The idea for the Bolan University of Medical & Health Sciences (BUMHS) was first proposed in 2004, and initial efforts to establish it began soon after. However, the project only materialized in 2017 when the Bolan University of Medical and Health Sciences Bill was passed by the Provincial Assembly of Balochistan on 11 December 2017. The BUMHS Act, 2017, was approved by the Governor of Balochistan, Muhammad Khan Achakzai, on 20 December 2017. The university was officially notified on 22 December 2017 and its establishment was published in the Gazette of Balochistan in March 2018. Prof. (Dr.) Naqib Ullah Achakzai was appointed as the first Vice Chancellor of BUMHS on 1 August 2018.

== Accreditation ==
It is accredited by the College of Physicians & Surgeons Pakistan to teach medicine, hematology, neurosurgery, obstetrics and gynecology, ophthalmology, otorhinolaryngology, pediatrics, psychiatry and surgery.

== Notable alumni ==
- Mahrang Baloch, Baloch political activist
