= Anti-Terrorism Act 1997 =

Pakistani law providing framework to combat terrorism

National Assembly of Pakistan
- Long title: An Act to provide for the prevention of terrorism, sectarianism and subversion, to take effective measures for the detection, investigation, prosecution and punishment of those offences and for matters connected therewith or incidental thereto.
- Territorial extent: Pakistan
- Enacted by: National Assembly of Pakistan
- Enacted: 20 August 1997
- Signed by: Farooq Leghari, then President of Pakistan
- Commenced: 28 August 1997

Summary
- Provides for the investigation, prosecution, and punishment of terrorism-related offenses, including the financing of terrorism, and the use of explosives and firearms. Establishes special anti-terrorism courts to try terrorism-related cases. Empowers law enforcement agencies to take measures to prevent and control terrorism.

The Anti-Terrorism Act 1997 is a Pakistani law that was enacted to provide a legal framework for the prevention and control of terrorism in the country. The law was passed by the National Assembly of Pakistan on 20 August 1997, and subsequently signed into law by then-President Farooq Leghari.

== Background ==
Pakistan has been plagued by terrorism for several decades, with numerous attacks targeting civilians, government officials, and security forces. The government of Pakistan recognized the need for a legal framework to combat terrorism and enacted the Anti-Terrorism Act 1997 in response to the growing threat.

== Provisions ==
The Anti-Terrorism Act 1997 defines terrorism as an act committed with the intention to intimidate the government or the public or a section of the public or to cause death or injury to any person. The law provides for the investigation, prosecution, and punishment of terrorism-related offenses, including the financing of terrorism, and the use of explosives and firearms.

Special anti-terrorism courts were established under the Act to try terrorism-related cases. These courts have the power to try cases in camera, use anonymous witnesses, and withhold the identity of the accused in certain circumstances. The Act also empowers law enforcement agencies to take a range of measures to prevent and control terrorism, including the power to arrest and detain suspects, conduct searches and seizures, and intercept communications.

== Controversies ==
Critics of the Anti-Terrorism Act 1997 have raised concerns about its potential misuse by law enforcement agencies and the violation of fundamental rights and freedoms, such as the right to a fair trial and due process. In recent years, the law has been subject to several amendments aimed at addressing some of these concerns.

In 2013, the Pakistani government passed the Anti-Terrorism (Amendment) Ordinance, which amended the Anti-Terrorism Act 1997 to provide for the establishment of special trial courts to deal with terrorism-related offenses. The ordinance was criticized by human rights groups for its potential to violate due process and fair trial guarantees.

In 2020, the Pakistani government passed the Anti-Terrorism (Third Amendment) Bill, which further amended the Anti-Terrorism Act 1997. The bill introduced several new provisions, including the power to detain suspects for up to 90 days without charge and the establishment of a new appellate tribunal to hear appeals against decisions of the special trial courts.

== See also ==
- Anti Terrorism Court of Pakistan
