= Baloch Yakjehti Committee =

Pakistani advocacy group in Balochistan Province

- بلۏچ یکجهتی کمیٹی; Baloch Unity Committee
- Abbreviation: BYC
- Formation: 2020
- Type: Human rights advocacy group
- Legal status: Active
- Purpose: Advocacy of human rights in Balochistan
- Region served: Balochistan, Pakistan
- Central Organizer: Dr. Mahrang Baloch

The Baloch Yakjehti Committee (BYC; Balochi: بلۏچ یکجهتی کمیٹی; lit. 'Baloch Unity Committee') or Balochistan Yakjehti Committee ('Balochistan Unity Committee'), is a human rights movement established in response to alleged state human rights abuses in Balochistan, Pakistan. The organisation has been confronted by Pakistani government as proxy of terrorist organisations and criminal smuggler groups. This organization was formed in 2020.

== Background ==
In December 2020, it campaigned against the alleged murder of Karima Baloch in Canada, who was believed by the activists to have been assassinated by the Pakistani state.

In 2023, the BYC launched campaigns to protest the detention of Mahal Baloch by the Counter Terrorism Department of the police in Quetta, the assassination of Rauf Baloch by religious extremists in Turbat, and the state's alleged use of religious extremism.

=== Protests ===
==== 2023 Baloch long march ====
The protest was sparked by the extrajudicial killing of Balach Mola Baksh, a 20-year-old from Turbat. Balach was abducted from his home on the night of October 29 by men in civilian clothes, suspected to be security officials, and was later killed in custody after a staged encounter by the Counter Terrorism Department (CTD) of Pakistan. Najma Mola Baksh, Balach's sister, also participated in the protest to seek justice for her brother and others. Najma said, "Even though I know I am not going to get justice here, but I will not leave till we get justice for all the other families who lost their loved ones, those who were killed or abducted by the state."

The protest was met with repeated harassment, arbitrary arrests, and disinformation campaigns by Pakistani authorities, including shelling and filing sedition cases against BYC leaders like Mahrang Baloch. Amnesty International condemned the severe crackdown on peaceful protesters. Despite the state's attempts to suppress the movement, the BYC presented a five-point charter of demands, including the formation of a United Nations fact-finding mission to investigate rights violations by security forces in Balochistan and the dismantling of CTD and other "death squads supported by the state agencies."

==== 2024 Baloch Raji Muchi ====
On July 27, 2024, the Frontier Corps, a Pakistani paramilitary force, fired on participants traveling to the Gwadar gathering, injuring 14. Authorities imposed blockades and a public assembly ban in Quetta to restrict movement. The next day, security forces killed at least three protesters and injured dozens more in Gwadar and Talar. On July 29, police used tear gas to disperse crowds and detained organizers, including Sammi Baloch, Sibghatullah Shah, and Dr. Sabiha Baloch.

Balochistan's Chief Minister Sarfraz Bugti criticized the protests, claiming they aimed to disrupt development in the province. Human rights groups including Amnesty International, Human Rights Watch, and the Human Rights Commission of Pakistan condemned the violent crackdowns and called for the release of detained protesters.

== Controversy ==
The Baloch Yakjehti Committee (BYC), while advocating for Baloch unity and rights, has faced criticism for allegedly backing separatist movements and promoting anti-state sentiments. It is believed that anti-Pakistan groups have significantly supported the BYC to destabilize Balochistan and undermine Pakistan-China economic cooperation. Through coordinated social media campaigns, BYC and Mahrang Baloch are accused of spreading narratives against the state, the military, and China. Critics have noted that Mahrang Baloch, the primary leader of Baloch Yakjehti Committee (BYC), has not publicly addressed or condemned the killings of civilians by militant groups such as the Baloch Liberation Army (BLA) and Baloch Liberation Front (BLF). These groups, while claiming to advocate for Baloch rights, have been responsible for attacks on civilians, public infrastructure, and dissenting voices. Observers argue that the lack of condemnation from activists like Mahrang undermines the credibility of their advocacy and overlooks the victims of militant violence.

Following the killing of 23 civilians in Musakhel/Loralai criticism has been directed at groups such as the Baloch Yakjehti Committee (BYC) for not condemning the attack, which was attributed to the banned Balochistan Liberation Army (BLA). Observers have questioned the silence of these groups, as well as of certain journalists and human rights advocates, who are otherwise vocal on issues of enforced disappearances. Critics argue that this selective condemnation raises concerns about potential bias and the overlooking of human rights violations committed by militant groups. Allegations have also surfaced regarding the use of women and children by groups like BYC to shield militants, and claims that individuals linked to armed outfits are portrayed as human rights defenders.

On 23 May 2025, Inter-Services Public Relations (ISPR) Director General Lt Gen Ahmed Sharif Chaudhry stated that the Baloch Yakjehti Committee (BYC) is not a legitimate Baloch movement but a campaign allegedly backed by Indian intelligence agencies. In a press briefing, he accused the BYC of acting against Pakistan's national interests and promoting narratives aligned with hostile foreign entities. He urged the media to critically examine the group's leadership and activities. Additionally, he declared BYC leader Mahrang Baloch as a terrorist proxy. Former senator and head of the Pakistan People's Party’s Human Rights Committee Farhatullah Babar warned against labeling Mahrang Baloch or her group as terrorists without due process, calling such actions problematic and potentially counterproductive.
