= Crime in Pakistan =

- Homicide: 4.3 (2024)
- Assault: 12.8 (2023)
- Burglary: 9.4 (2022)
- Theft: 166.4 (2024)
- Rape: 2.4 (2023)
- Sexual violence: 2.4 (2023)
- reported per 100,000 inhabitants

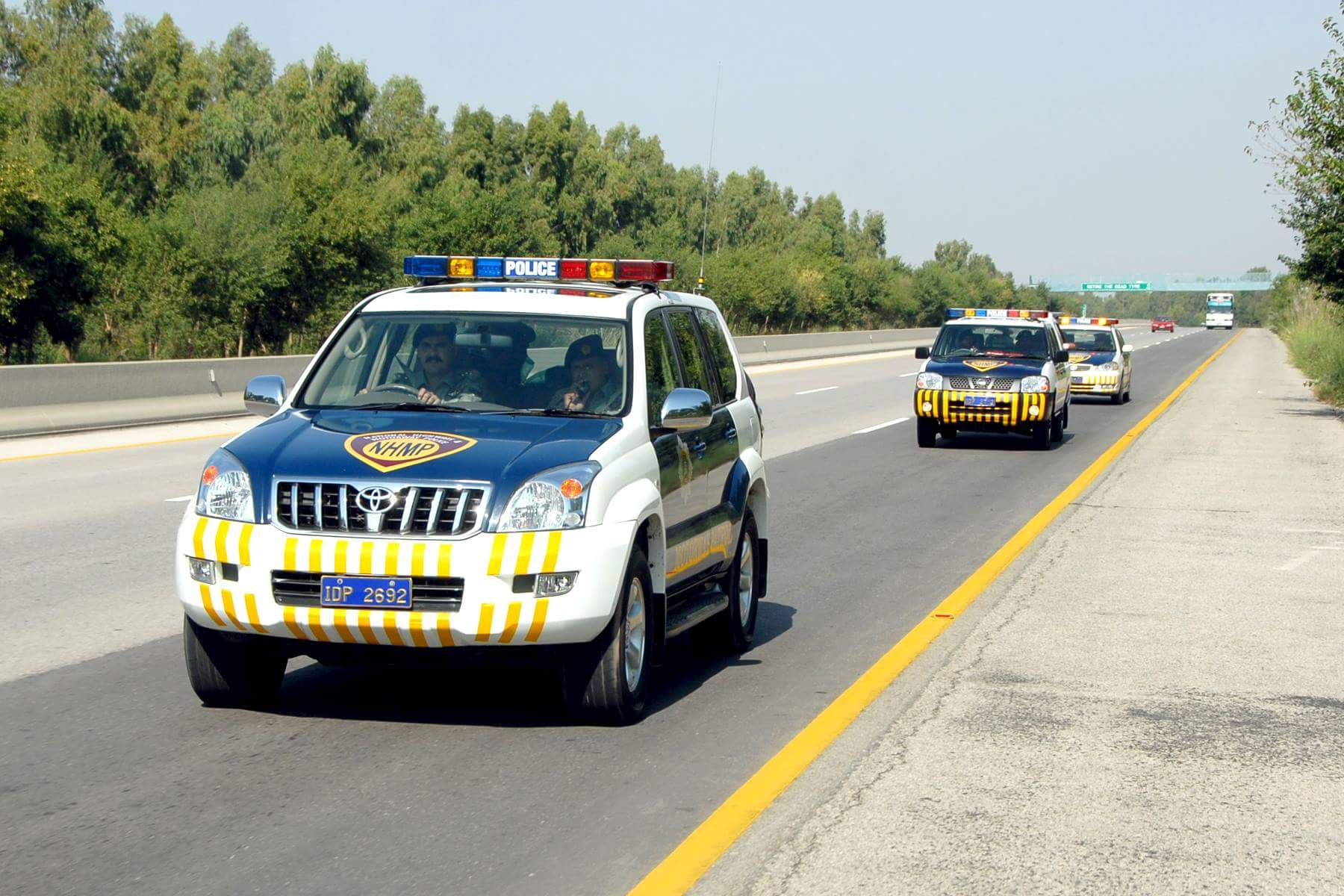
Police vehicles in the streets of Pakistan.

Crime in Pakistan is present in various forms, especially in the cities of Karachi, Lahore, Faisalabad, Rawalpindi, Gujranwala, Peshawar, Multan, Hyderabad, Islamabad and Quetta. Among other general crimes, it includes major crimes such as murder, rape, kidnapping, armed robbery, burglary, carjacking and corruption. For example, in the city of Lahore, 379 murders, 500 attempted murders, 2,650 abductions and 55 rapes have occurred in 2019. A direct relationship has been identified between the crime rate and unemployment rate in Pakistan. Elevated unemployment diminishes the attractiveness of legal endeavours, consequently raising the potential gains from illicit pursuits. As a result, the likelihood of an upsurge in illegal activities rises. Crime statistics of Pakistan shows that there is a rapid increase in the number of crime reported over time like other countries of the world, mainly due to high unemployment, rising poverty, increasing inflation and urbanisation. Some other non-economic factors are also responsible for it.

== Organised crime ==
Organised crime in Pakistan includes fraud, racketeering, drug trafficking, smuggling, money laundering, extortion, ransom, political violence, etc. Terrorist attacks became common during the 2000s, especially in North-West Frontier Province, the Federally Administered Tribal Areas, Balochistan, Karachi and Lahore. Vehicle theft is common, particularly in the large cities.

== Opium production ==
Pakistan falls under the Golden Crescent, which is one of the two major illicit opium producing centres in Asia. Opium poppy cultivation in Pakistan is estimated to be 800 hectares in 2005 yielding a potential production of 4 metric tons of heroin. Opium has been historically cultivated primarily in Khyber Pakhtunkhwa, in the areas near to the border with Afghanistan. Until the late 1970s, opium production levels were relatively static; it increased after 1979. An estimated $4 billion is generated from drug trafficking in Pakistan.

== Crimes against women ==
Violence against women in Pakistan, particularly intimate partner violence and sexual violence, is a major public health problem and a violation of women's human rights in Pakistan. Women in Pakistan mainly encounter violence by being forced into marriage, through workplace sexual harassment, domestic violence and by so-called honour killings.

In some cases, such as Mukhtar Mai gang rape in Muzaffargarh, village elder's council (jirga) in Pakistan have ordered that the girl in a family is gang-raped as a means of punishing her brother, and this punishment was then carried out in public with everyone watching. Land, Gold and Women is a documentary about the conditions of typical women in rural Pakistan. It chronicles the traditional use of ritual gang rape as a method of social control. Central to the film are the stories of Mukhtar Mai, and Dr. Shazia Khalid.

== Corruption and police misconduct ==
Corruption in Pakistan involves fraudulent practices carried out by officials and institutions, ranging from petty bribery to high-profile scandals.

Corruption distorts economic decision-making, deters investment, undermines competitiveness and, ultimately, hinders economic growth in the country. The problems are deeply entrenched, spanning back decades, and despite ongoing calls for reform, and many attempts to improve the situation, there is little evidence of progress.

orruption runs rampant throughout various sectors and facets of life in Pakistan, but when it comes to the prevalence of corruption, the Pakistan Police stand out as unparalleled. According to surveys and reports from international organisations and non-governmental organisations (NGOs), the police force is consistently identified as the most corrupt institution in Pakistan.

== See also ==
- Organised crime in Pakistan
- Snatch theft in Karachi
- Pakistan Penal Code
- Capital punishment in Pakistan
- Human trafficking in Pakistan
- Gambling in Pakistan
- Human rights in Pakistan
- Law enforcement in Pakistan
- Rape in Pakistan
- Targeted killings in Pakistan
- Honour killing in Pakistan
- Sectarian violence in Pakistan
- Religious discrimination in Pakistan
- Terrorism in Pakistan
  - List of terrorist incidents in Pakistan since 2001
