= Shagufta =

Shagufta شکفته
- Gender: Female

Origin
- Origin: Persian
- Meaning: Cheerful, full-blown, opened
- Region of origin: Iranian plateau and Indian subcontinent

Other names
- Alternative spelling: Shegufta, Shekofteh
- Related names: Shegufa, Shekoufeh, Shokoufeh

Shagufta or Shegufta, derived from Shekofteh (Persian: شکفته), is a Persian-language feminine given name meaning cheerful, full-blown, or opened. Variations include the name Shegufa in Dari or the name Shekoufeh or Shokoufeh in Persian, both of which mean blossom. It is a common name among Urdu-speaking Muslims in the Indian subcontinent.

== Given name ==
- Shagufta Ali, Indian film and television actress
- Shagufta Anwar, Pakistani politician
- Shagufta Ejaz (born 1960), Pakistani actress
- Shagufta Faisal, Pakistani politician
- Shagufta Jumani, Pakistani politician
- Shagufta Kausar, Pakistani Christian refugee
- Shagufta Malik, Pakistani politician
- Shagufta Rafique (born 1965), Indian film director
- Shagufta Sadiq, Pakistani politician
- Shegufta Bakht Chaudhuri (1931–2020), Bangladeshi economist
- Shekoufeh Safari (born 1989), Iranian volleyball player
- Shokufeh Kavani (born 1970), Iranian-born Australian contemporary artist

== Surname ==
- Sara Shagufta (1954–1984), Pakistani poet
