= Among the Believers (film) =

2015 documentary film

- Directed by: Hemal Trivedi; Mohammed Ali Naqvi
- Written by: Jonathan Goodman Levitt
- Produced by: Jonathan Goodman Levitt; Hemal Trivedi
- Cinematography: Haider Ali; Sardar Habib ur Rehman
- Edited by: Hemal Trivedi
- Music by: Milind Date
- Production companies: Changeworx Films LLC; Manjusha Films LLC
- Distributed by: Submarine
- Release date: April 17, 2015 (Tribeca Film Festival)
- Running time: 84 minutes
- Countries: Pakistan, United States
- Language: English/Urdu

Among the Believers is a 2015 documentary film directed by Hemal Trivedi and Mohammed Ali Naqvi and produced by Jonathan Goodman Levitt and Hemal Trivedi. The executive producer was Whitney Burton Dow and co-producers were Naziha Ali and Syed Musharaf Shah. The film had its US premiere at Tribeca Film Festival on April 17, 2015 and was pitched at the 2013 MeetMarket as part of Sheffield Doc/Fest. After its theatrical release, it aired on television on World Channel's Doc World.

The documentary examines the increasing political and religious turmoil in Pakistan since the war on terror, with specific attention to the Red Mosque (Lal Masjid) and its network of madrasas. The Red Mosque's madrasas are live-in Islamic seminaries which admit youths. The struggle between militant Islamist forces and secular forces are seen to play out in the country's educational system. The Soviet–Afghan War and the Siege of the Red Mosque are depicted as well.

The main focus of the film is the head of the Red Mosque, Maulana Abdul Aziz Ghazi. Abdul Aziz takes the filmmakers on a tour of his madrasas in Islamabad and the countryside. He explains his point of view, and why he advocates jihad in favor of instituting Sharia law as Pakistan's main law. Abdul Aziz also explains key events in his life and the history of his organization.

As a counterpoint, the film features noted nuclear physicist and civil activist Pervez Hoodbhoy, who provides broader context on the history presented by Abdul Aziz. The film also tracks the lives of two adolescent students in madrasas run by the Red Mosque (named Talha and Zarina), and a village chief (Tariq) who creates a school centered around academics rather than religious education.

== Peshawar school massacre ==
After principal filming was complete, the 2014 Peshawar School Massacre, in which 132 school children and nine other people were killed, occurred on December 16, 2014. The film touches upon the massacre, and presents the following backlash against the Taliban and other extremist groups. Abdul Aziz comments on the massacre in the film, saying that the deaths were unfortunate, but an understandable product of aggression against extremists by the government. Publicly Abdul Aziz refused to condemn the attack, which fed backlash against him personally.

Co-Producer Syed Musharaf Shah lost four family members in the Peshawar School Massacre.

== Plot ==
Cleric Abdul Aziz Ghazi is waging jihad against the Pakistani state. His dream is to impose a strict version of Sharia law throughout the country, as a model for the world. A flashpoint in Aziz's holy war took place in 2007, with the Siege of the Red Mosque. During a standoff with the Pakistani military, the government leveled Aziz's flagship mosque to the ground, killing his mother, brother, only son and 150 students. The filmmakers follow Aziz on his personal quest to create an Islamic utopia, during the bloodiest period in Pakistan's modern history.

The film also follows the lives of two teenage students who have attended madrasas (Islamic seminaries) run by Aziz's Red Mosque network. Throughout the film, their paths diverge: Talha, 12, detaches from his moderate Muslim family and decides to become a jihadi preacher. Zarina, also 12, escapes her madrasa and joins a regular school. Over the next few years, Zarina's education is threatened by frequent Taliban attacks on schools like her own.

Aziz’s foil is nuclear physicist and leading educational activist Dr. Pervez Hoodbhoy. He passionately opposes Aziz through his public appearances, lectures, and the media. Opposition against Aziz comes to a head in December, 2014, when Aziz insults a grieving nation by trying to justify the brutal massacre of 132 school children in Peshawar by the Taliban. The attack ignites a movement to end extremism in Pakistan’s mosques and madrasas. Led by Hoodbhoy and others, Pakistan's moderate majority focuses on Aziz and calls for his arrest.

== Awards and nominations ==
Awards
Category	Award	Result
Best Feature	ALBA Human Rights Documentary Film Fest	Won
Best of Fest	Chagrin Documentary Film Festival	Won
F:ACT Award	CPH:Dox	Won
Best Documentary	Hollywood Film Festival	Won
Best International Documentary	Oaxaca FilmFest	Won
Best Documentary	Seattle South Asian Film Festival	Won
Truer than Fiction Award	Film Independent Spirit Award	Nominated
Best Documentary Film	Asia Pacific Screen Awards	Nominated
UNESCO-Fellini Prize	International Film Festival of India	Nominated
Best Feature	Abraham Lincoln Brigade Association Human Rights Film Festival	Won

== Music ==
All music is original music specially composed for this film by Milind Date, who also performed Bansuri on some tracks. Sitar is played by Sameep Kulkarni from Pune, India. The music is composed in the style of Punjab region as most of the film takes place there. Most music was recorded using Cubase software in Pune, India. The film's final song is Aik Alif, by Saieen Zahoor and Noori, and produced by Rohail Hyatt for Coke Studio (Pakistan).
