= Mohammed Ali Naqvi =

Pakistani filmmaker

- Naqvi in 2026
- Born: August 16, 1979 (age 47); Montréal, Canada
- Education: University of Pennsylvania
- Occupations: Film director, producer
- Years active: 2003–present
- Notable work: The Accused: Damned or Devoted?; Insha’Allah Democracy; Among the Believers; Shame
- Website: monaqvi.com

Mohammed Ali Naqvi (Urdu: محمد علئ نقوئ; born 1979) is a Pakistani filmmaker based in New York City. He is known for documentaries which shed light on the socio political conditions of Pakistan, and feature strong characters on personal journeys of self-discovery. Notable films include Insha’Allah Democracy (2017), Among the Believers (2015), Shame (2007), and Terror’s Children (2003).

== Early life and background ==
Naqvi was born in Montreal, Canada, and spent his early years between Canada, Pakistan and the US. After completing a Bachelor of Arts degree from the University of Pennsylvania in 2001, and theatre training from the Lee Strasberg Theatre and Film Institute, Naqvi founded B.L.A.H Productions, an off-off-Broadway theatre company in New York, for which he produced, directed and acted in a number of plays.

== Film career ==
In 2003, Naqvi produced Terror’s Children (Discovery Channel) in collaboration with Pakistani Emmy-Award winner Sharmeen Obaid-Chinoy. The film portrays young Afghan refugees living in Pakistan post 9/11 in refugee camps and extreme poverty mediated only by the madrassa school network which provides basic necessities in return for hardline militant religious schooling. The film won the Overseas Press Club Award: The Carl Spielvogel Award in 2004 and the South Asian Journalist Award in 2004.

In 2005, Naqvi produced Big River which was directed by Atsushi Funahashi. The film depicted a story about cross-cultural friendship between a Pakistani man, a Japanese boy, and an American woman who meet while traveling in Arizona. The film featured as an official selection at the Berlin International Film Festival (2005), the Karlovy Vary International Film Festival (2006), and the Pusan International Film Festival (2005), where it was also nominated for the New Currents Award.

In 2006, Naqvi wrote, produced and directed Shame (Paramount/Showtime), a hard-hitting documentary chronicling the life of Mukhtaran Mai, the Pakistani survivor of gang rape who went on to become a human rights activist after taking her perpetrators to trial in a landmark case. The film won several awards including a Special Emmy Award (2008), the Amnesty International Durban Human Rights Award (2007), and the Women in Leadership Award at the Full Frame Documentary Film Festival (2007).

In 2012, Naqvi directed Shabeena’s Quest (Al-Jazeera) with Hemal Trivedi. The film features the story of Shabeena, a remarkable school principal fighting for the right of girls to be educated despite age-old traditions leading to early marriages.

In 2014, Naqvi directed Pakistan’s Hidden Shame (Channel 4 UK), which was produced by Jamie Doran. This documentary highlights pedophilia in Pakistan by depicting vulnerable young boys on the streets of Peshawar who have suffered sexual abuse at the hands of truck drivers passing through the city. In the sexually frustrated and impoverished society lacking healthy outlets for sexual needs, boys as young as seven are prostituted for petty cash in makeshift hostels. The film was screened at the Sheffield Doc/Fest (2014), and won Best Documentary at the United Nations Association Film Festival (2014).

In 2015, Naqvi directed Among the Believers with Hemal Trivedi. It was produced by Jonathan Goodman Levitt and Hemal Trivedi, and the executive producer was Whitney Dow. The documentary examines the role of the Red Mosque (Lal Masjid) and its network of religious schools (madrasas) in manufacturing militant religious sectarianism in Pakistan. The film highlights Maulana Abdul Aziz Ghazi’s role as the leader of the Red Mosque, pushing for a hardline interpretation of Islam and Jihad. As a counterpoint, the film also features the nuclear physicist and civil activist Pervez Hoodbhoy who champions a secular education system in favor of tolerant and progressive values. These differing ideologies play out in the state sanctioned vacuum of educational and financial infrastructure in poverty stricken villages of Pakistan, which the Red Mosque is quick to fill in exchange for young recruits.

The film has its US premiere at Tribeca Film Festival on April 17, 2015. It has since won many awards, including Best Feature at the ALBA Human Rights Documentary Film Festival, Best of Fest at Chagrin Documentary Film Festival (2017), Best Documentary at Hollywood Film Festival (2015), Best International Documentary at Oaxaca FilmFest (2015), and more.

In April 2016, the Central Board of Film Censors banned Among the Believers from being screened in Pakistan, giving the reason that it “projects the negative image of Pakistan in the context of ongoing fight against extremism terrorism.” Both Naqvi and co-director Hemal Trivedi received death threats after the release of the film, forcing them to go into hiding for a period of time.

In 2017, Naqvi directed, wrote, and produced Insha’Allah Democracy with producer Jared Ian Goldman. The documentary follows the controversial former military dictator of Pakistan, General Pervez Musharraf, as he returns to Pakistan to contest in the 2013 Pakistani general election. Naqvi himself features prominently in the film, as a citizen voting in the country’s general elections for the first time. As a member of the Shia minority, Naqvi is attracted to Musharraf’s secular stance and past crackdowns on sectarian violence. The film examines the contradictions and complexities of a nascent democratic process in a country recovering from a long history of military rule.

The film had its world premiere at Sheffield Doc/Fest (2017), where it was nominated for the Tim Hetherington Award. It has also screened at Films from the South (2017), DOC NYC (2017), IDFA (2017), FIPA (2018), Human Rights Watch Film Festival (2018), and the UK Asian Film Festival (2018).

Pakistani activists in the UK called for the film to be banned from its London premiere at the Human Rights Watch Film Festival (2018), claiming that the film "legitimises and glorifies military dictatorial rules and undermines civilian/parliament supremacy.” In response the Human Rights Watch released a statement saying that the film was chosen because of its criticism of military rule.

Naqvi’s next film, The Accused: Damned or Devoted?, which he directed and produced, was released in 2020. The film follows the rise of the cleric Khadim Hussain Rizvi as he pushes to preserve Pakistan’s blasphemy laws by rallying millions of supporters, running for elections, and silencing those attempting to change the law by condemning them to death. It also follows Asia Bibi, a Christian woman falsely accused of blasphemy, as well as activist Gulalai Ismail as she is falsely accused of blasphemy.

When he was initially approached to make a film about the blasphemy laws in Pakistan, Naqvi refused because of the potential security risk. Naqvi did eventually make the film, and has said that it is “the most dangerous film” he has worked on.

The film won Best Investigation at the Asian Media Awards (2020). It was a runner-up in the Feature Documentary category at the South Asian Film Festival of Montréal (2020). It was also nominated for the CPH: DOX F:ACT Award (2020), and in the International Affairs Documentary category for the AIB Media Excellence awards (2020). In 2023 the film secured a nomination at the 75th Primetime Emmy Awards in the ‘Exceptional Merit in Documentary Filmmaking’ category.

Naqvi then went on to co-executive produce the Netflix series Turning Point: 9/11 and the War on Terror, which came out in September 2021. It is a five-part docuseries examining the events and repercussions of the September 11, 2001 attacks, exploring the impact on Afghanistan and the broader war on terror. The series was directed by Brian Kannpenberger.

The series was received well by both the critics and audience with famed author Stephen King also giving it a nod. It went onto reach the global Top Ten on Netflix. Furthermore in 2022 the series received a nomination at the 43rd News and Documentary Emmy Awards in the ‘Outstanding Politics and Government Documentary’ Category.

In 2022, Naqvi became an Oscar’s member after being inducted into the Academy of Motion Pictures along with other notable personalities such as Caitríona Balfe, Billie Eilish, famed Bollywod actor Kajol, best supporting actor winner Ariana DeBose and many more.

In 2023, the Pakistan Academy Selection Committee (PASC) appointed Naqvi as the Committee’s Chairperson, taking over from the previous chair, Director Sharmeen Obaid-Chinoy. He served in this capacity in 2023 and 2024. The PASC is the body that selects Pakistan’s official entry for the Academy Awards for Best International Feature Film each year.

For the first selection committee under Naqvi, the jury members included director/ cinematographer Bilal Lashari, Joyland’s Saim Sadiq, actor Fawad Khan, author Fatima Bhutto and others. The committee selected Zarrar Kahn’s In Flames to send to the 95th Academy Awards.

In February 2024, Netflix expanded the Turning Point franchise with Turning Point: The Bomb and the Cold War. Naqvi again went onto co-executive produce the series with Brian Knappenberger returning to the director's seat. The second part is a chronicle of Cold War history, from the development of the atomic bomb to the proliferation of nuclear weapons, including an examination of the collapse of the Soviet Union, the rise of Vladimir Putin and the Russian invasion of Ukraine.

The series features more than 100 interviews conducted in 7 countries around the world revealing personal stories that show how much the Cold War transformed lives and drove world history. The series includes interviews with seven current or former world leaders including Ukrainian President Volodymyr Zelenskyy as well as prominent political figures like NATO Secretary General Jens Stoltenberg, former CIA Director Robert Gates and former Secretary of State Condoleezza Rice.

== Other work and media image ==
In June of 2024 Naqvi was at the helm of a historical moment for Pakistan, setting up and leading the Crescent Film Collective representing Pakistan’s official presence at the 77th annual Cannes Film Festival and marked the first time the country had a central hub at the global event. The program of the collective included a sneak peek of Usman Riaz’s The Glassworker, Pakistan’s first 2d hand- animated feature film, followed by a discussion with the filmmaker.

The Collective also partnered with Seattle based Oscar-qualifying Tasveer South Asian Film Festival to introduce and co host the first South Asian Film Market as part of the program. The event which took place at the American Pavilion posed an opportunity for filmmaking teams to meet with film financiers and funders to pitch their next project. The market boasted sponsors such as Amazon, NBC Universal Launch, Film Companion, credit union BECU, civil liberties organization ACLUWA, University of Washington South Asia Center and Bully Media.

== Filmography ==
Year	Title	Director	Producer	Writer
2003	Terror's Children		Yes	
2005	Big River		Yes	
2006	Shame	Yes	Yes	Yes
2012	Shabeena's Quest	Yes		
2014	Pakistan's Hidden Shame	Yes		
2015	Among the Believers	Yes		
2017	Insha'Allah Democracy	Yes	Yes	Yes
2020	The Accused: Damned or Devoted?	Yes	Yes	
2021	Turning Point: 9/11 and the War on Terror		Yes	
2024	Turning Point: The Bomb and the Cold War		Yes	
2026	Hanging by a Wire	Yes	Yes	Yes

== Awards and nominations ==
Year	Award	Category	Work	Result
2004	Overseas Press Club Award	The Carl Spielvogel Award	Terror's Children	Won
2004	South Asian Journalist Award		Terror's Children	Won
2005	Pusan International Film Festival	New Currents Award	Big River	Nominated
2007	EBS International Documentary Festival Korea	Special Jury Prize	Shame	Won
2007	Chicago Documentary Festival	Human Rights Award	Shame	Won
2007	Full Frame Documentary Film Festival	Women in Leadership Award	Shame	Won
2007	Durban International Film Festival	Amnesty International Award	Shame	Won
2008	Television Academy Honor	Special Emmy Award	Shame	Won
2008	San Diego Asian Film Festival	Best Documentary	Shame	Won
2014	United Nations Association Film Festival	Best Documentary	Pakistan's Hidden Shame	Won
2015	One World Media	Annual Television Award	Pakistan's Hidden Shame	Nominated
2015	Broadcast Awards	Best News Coverage or Current Affairs Program	Pakistan's Hidden Shame	Nominated
2015	Asia Pacific Screen Awards	Best Documentary	Among the Believers	Nominated
2015	International Film Festival of India	UNESCO/FELLINI Prize	Among the Believers	Nominated
2015	ALBA Human Rights Documentary Film Festival	Best Feature	Among the Believers	Won
2015	Chagrin Documentary Film Festival	David Ponce Award for Best Film	Among the Believers	Won
2015	CPH:DOX	F:ACT Award Jury Prize	Among the Believers	Won
2015	Tasveer Seattle South Asian Film Festival	Best Documentary and Audience Choice Prize	Among the Believers	Won
2015	Oaxaca FilmFest	Best International Documentary	Among the Believers	Won
2015	Hollywood Film Festival	Best Feature Documentary	Among the Believers	Won
2016	Film Independent Spirit Award	Truer Than Fiction Award	Among the Believers	Nominated
2016	Beloit International Film Festival	Power of Film Award	Among the Believers	Won
2016	Documentary Edge Festival	Best International Feature (Special Mention) and Best International Director	Among the Believers	Won
2016	FIFDH	Grand Prix	Among the Believers	Won
2016	San Sebastian Human Rights Film Festival	Amnesty International Prize	Among the Believers	Won
2016	SOMA Film Festival	Documentary Feature, Best Director	Among the Believers	Won
2016	Accolade Competition	Award of Merit, Documentary Feature	Among the Believers	Special Mention
2017	News & Documentary Emmy Award	Outstanding Politics and Government Documentary	Among the Believers	Nominated
2017	Cinema Eye Honors	Spotlight Award	Among the Believers	Nominated
2017	Impact Docs Awards	Awards of Merit, Documentary Feature	Among the Believers	Won
2017	Sheffield Doc/Fest	Tim Hetherington Award	Insha'Allah Democracy	Nominated
2018	Middlebury New Filmmakers Festival	Courage in Filmmaking Award	Insha'Allah Democracy	Won
2018	FIPA	Best International Documentary, Youth Jury Award	Insha'Allah Democracy	Nominated
2019	Accolade Competition	Awards of Recognition: Documentary Feature, Islamic	Insha'Allah Democracy	Won
2019	One World Media	Feature Documentary Award	Insha'Allah Democracy	Nominated
2020	CPH:DOX	F:ACT Award	The Accused: Damned or Devoted?	Nominated
2020	AIB Media Excellence Awards	International Affairs Documentary	The Accused: Damned or Devoted?	Nominated
2020	South Asian Film Festival of Montréal	Feature Documentary	The Accused: Damned or Devoted?	Runner-up
2020	Asian Media Awards	Best Investigation	The Accused: Damned or Devoted?	Won
2023	75th Primetime Emmy Awards	Exceptional Merit in Documentary Filmmaking	The Accused: Damned or Devoted?	Nominated
2022	43rd News and Documentary Emmy Awards	Outstanding Politics and Government Documentary	Turning Point: 9-11 and the War on Terror	Nominated
