= Outlawed in Pakistan =

Pakistani documentary film

- Directed by: Habiba Nosheen; Hilke Schellmann
- Written by: Habiba Nosheen; Hilke Schellmann
- Produced by: Habiba Nosheen; Hilke Schellmann; Dan Sugarman
- Starring: Kainat Soomro
- Narrated by: Habiba Nosheen
- Edited by: Hemal Trivedi
- Music by: John E. Low
- Release date: January 2013 (Sundance Film Festival)
- Running time: 52 minutes
- Country: Pakistan
- Languages: Urdu, English, Sindhi

Outlawed in Pakistan is a 2013 documentary film by Habiba Nosheen and Hilke Schellmann. The film follows Kainat Soomro, a Pakistani woman who was gang raped at the age of 13 and struggled to obtain justice.

The film was featured at the Sundance Film Festival in January 2013. A longer version aired on PBS Frontline.

== Synopsis ==
Outlawed in Pakistan traces Kainat Soomro's experiences with the Pakistani justice system and the attempts of the four alleged rapists to clear their names.

The documentary includes interviews with Soomro, her family, her lawyer Faisal Siddiqi, the defense lawyer, and the alleged rapists.

== Production ==
Outlawed in Pakistan was filmed over the course of four years in Soomro's hometown Dadu and Karachi. Filmmakers Habiba Nosheen and Hilke Schellmann wanted to find stories of women in Pakistan who were challenging stereotypes and pushing the boundaries of what is expected of them as women. They initially followed two other women in addition to Soomro, but shifted their focus solely to her following developments in her court case.

An early version of the film was featured at the Sundance Film Festival in January 2013. This version focussed on Soomro's point of view and the types of struggles faced by a woman takes a rape case to court in Pakistan. Frontline provided the filmmakers with additional funding so that they could translate all of their footage and return to Pakistan. Nosheen and Schellmann were able to find and interview a cleric who backed the men's claims that Soomro had married one of them. The longer, 52-minute version included more details about the legal case and aired on 28 May 2013.

== Awards ==
Outlawed in Pakistan won an Emmy Award in 2014 for Outstanding Informational Programming — Long Form & Outstanding Research. It also won the Overseas Press Club's David A. Andelman and Pamela Title Award for "the best international reporting in the broadcast media showing a concern for the human condition." The film also won a Cinema for Peace Award for Justice.

== See also ==
- Rape in Pakistan
