= Hemal Trivedi =

Indian documentary film director and editor

- Born: Maharashtra, India
- Occupations: Director, editor, producer
- Years active: 2006–present

Hemal Trivedi is an Indian documentary film director, editor and producer. She is best known for her work on the documentaries Shabeena's Quest, and Among the Believers.

== Life and career ==
Hemal was born and raised in Maharashtra, India. She holds an MBA in Marketing from SVKM's NMIMS and an MFA from the University of Florida.

Hemal Trivedi (India/U.S.) has been editing and directing documentary films for 20 years. Her entire body of work has won one Oscar, three Emmys, one Peabody and seven Emmy nominations, a nomination for MTV Movie Awards, nominations for Independent Spirits Awards and Cinema Eye Award. Netflix, HBO, PBS (Frontline and Independent Lens), YouTube Red, Showtime, BBC, Topic and Channel 4 have broadcast her work. Her films have screened in prestigious festivals like Sundance, TIFF, Tribeca, IDFA, CPH-DOX, Telluride, IFFI Goa, Berlin Film Festival.

She is a member of Academy of Motion Picture Arts and Sciences and the Television Academy. She was recently selected as a participant in the “Television Academy’s Peer Circle Program", a small group of 12 Emmy winning filmmakers who meet monthly to grow their skills professionally. She has served as a speaker, mentor, panelist and judge for TEDx, Independent Film Week, the Emmys, Oscars and other prestigious awarding bodies.

In 2015, Hemal co-directed the feature documentary, Among the Believers, along with Mohammed Ali Naqvi, which premiered at the Tribeca Film Festival. The Central Board of Film Censors (CFBC) banned, Among the Believers, from being screened in Pakistan, giving the reason that it "projects the negative image of Pakistan in the context of ongoing fight against extremism terrorism." Both Hemal and co-director Mohammed Ali Naqvi received death threats after the release of the film, forcing them to go into hiding for a period of time. In 2020, Hemal directed, Battleground, about current political divide, as seen through the eyes of two grassroots political leaders in the key pivot county of Lehigh Valley, Pennsylvania, and aired nationally on PBS.

She started her filmmaking career at Odyssey Networks where she made short films focussed on building bridges of understanding in conflict zones around the world. She’s made films on Haiti, Sudan, Nigeria, covered the Arab Spring coupled with the rise of ISIS and across America covering topics from race based gentrification to politics of hunger. Soon she got her first break in long form documentaries when she edited an HBO documentary Saving Face. The film won an Academy Award and Hemal won her first Emmy for Outstanding Editing. Hemal directed her first film in Pakistan as well. Her film, Among the Believers, on a radical mosque - The Red Mosque - and Pakistan’s internal struggle against religious extremism, premiered at Tribeca and traveled the world. It won 22 prominent awards and an Emmy, Independent Spirit, Cinema Eye and UNESCO Fellini nomination. Hemal’s other key credits are: Philly DA, Battleground, Watergate, This is Everything: Gigi Gorgeous, Among the Believers, Inshallah Democracy, Outlawed in Pakistan, Saving Face, and When the Drum is Beating.

Hemal was born and raised in an inner-city chawl (the ghetto) of Mumbai, India, Hemal spent her formative years striving to climb the social ladder. She did odd jobs ranging from working as a concierge in Mumbai's five-star hotels, to a lab technician in a microbiology lab. With the help of a state scholarship, Hemal entered one of India's most prestigious business schools in India (NMIMS) and got her MBA in Marketing. She worked in mutual funds in India before moving to the U.S. to pursue her passion for non-fiction storytelling. She has a master’s degree in Journalism and Mass Communications from University of Florida.

== Filmography ==
Year	Title	Director	Editor	Producer	Note
2006	Tell Me a Story	✓	✓	✓	Documentary short
2008	Flying on One Engine		✓		Documentary
2010	Beyond Mumbai: Hope and Healing	✓	✓	✓	Documentary short
2011	When the Drum Is Beating		✓		Documentary
2011	Voices of Sudan	✓			Documentary short
2012	Saving Face		✓		Documentary short
2012	Shabeena's Quest	✓	✓	✓	Documentary short
2013	Outlawed in Pakistan		✓		Documentary short
2015	Among the Believers	✓	✓	✓	Documentary
2017	This Is Everything: Gigi Gorgeous		✓		Documentary
2017	My Big Bollywood Wedding	✓	✓	✓	TV show
2017	Insha'Allah Democracy		✓		Documentary
2018	Watergate: Or how we learned to control an out of control president		✓		Documentary series
2020	Battleground	✓	✓	✓	Documentary
2021	Philly DA		✓		Documentary Series
2022	In Search of My Sister		✓	✓	Documentary

== Awards and nominations ==
Year	Result	Award	Category	Work	Ref.
2013	Won	Emmy Award	Outstanding Editing: Documentary and Long Form	Saving Face	
2015	Nominated	Asia Pacific Screen Awards	Best Documentary	Among the Believers	
2015	Won	Chagrin Documentary Film Festival	David Ponce Award for Best Film	Among the Believers	
2016	Won	Beloit International Film Festival	Power of Film Award	Among the Believers	
2016	Won	Documentary Edge Festival	Best International Feature Director	Among the Believers	
2016	Won	FIFDH	Grand Prix	Among the Believers	
2017	Nominated	News & Documentary Emmy Award	Outstanding Politics and Government Documentary	Among the Believers	
2017	Nominated	Cinema Eye Honors	Spotlight Award	Among the Believers	
