= Domestic violence in Pakistan =

Domestic violence in Pakistan is an endemic social and public health problem. Over 2,000 cases of domestic violence, 500 cases of honor killings, and 5,000 cases of rape were reported across Pakistan in 2024. Conviction rates were below 2 percent. According to a study carried out in 2009 by Human Rights Watch, 10-20% of women in Pakistan have suffered some form of abuse. Women have reported attacks ranging from physical to psychological and sexual abuse from intimate partners. A survey carried out by the Thomson Reuters Foundation ranked Pakistan as the sixth most dangerous country for women while India ranked 1st as the most dangerous country for women. Given the very few women's shelters in the country, victims have limited ability to escape from violent situations.

One of the main reasons why domestic violence is so prevalent in Pakistan is the deeply entrenched patriarchal norms that exist in the country. These norms place men in positions of power and authority over women and children, and they can make it difficult for women to assert their rights and seek help. In addition, the legal framework around domestic violence in Pakistan is weak, and the government has been criticized for not doing enough to protect women and children from abuse.

== Overview ==
=== Definition ===
As defined by the World Health Organization, domestic violence encompasses physical and psychological distress including sexual coercive acts towards primarily women by a current or former male intimate partner.

The landmark Domestic Violence (Prevention and Protection) Act passed in 2012 by the Pakistani Senate defines domestic violence as including, “all acts of gender based and other physical or psychological abuse committed by a respondent against women, children or other vulnerable persons…” The definition then further specifies assault, attempt at assault, criminal force, criminal intimidation, emotional, psychological, and verbal abuse, harassment, stalking, sexual abuse, physical abuse, and economic abuse as some of the actions that fall under domestic violence.

=== Statistics ===
An estimated 5000 women are killed per year from domestic violence, with thousands of others maimed or disabled. Lisa Hajjar, an associate professor at the University of California, describes abuse against women in Pakistan as "endemic in all social spheres". In an observational study published in the Pakistan Journal of Medical Sciences based on a convenience sample of 218 women in the gynecology wards of three hospitals, 97% of the interviewed women said they had been victims of some form of assault, ranging from verbal abuse or threatened, to being subjected to beatings or non-consensual sex. A study by the United Nations found that 50% of married women have experienced sexual violence and 90% have been psychologically abused. Studies by the Pakistan Nation Women's Division and Zakar et al. confirmed these statistics of high percentages of domestic violence in Pakistani households.

Research has also shown high rates of domestic violence primarily in rural communities and Afghani refugees living in Pakistan. A cross-sectional survey of 490 randomly selected women from a rural health center in Pakistan of reproductive age reported that 65% of those interviewed had experienced domestic violence. A special report by the United Nations of the state of violence against women in Pakistan reported that Afghani refugees are left out of Pakistani services and of Pakistani statistics. The report noted that violence against women like child abuse and domestic violence is considerably high, however, proper statistics on this population are difficult to obtain.

According to the 2017–18 Pakistan Demographic and Health Survey, 28% of women aged 15–49 have experienced physical violence and 6% sexual violence, with 34% of ever-married women reporting spousal violence.

International media have repeatedly highlighted the issue: BBC has reported extensively on acid attacks as a form of domestic abuse, while Reuters ranked Pakistan among the most dangerous countries for women in 2018.

A 2024 overview by British Pakistani Index synthesised government and NGO data, concluding that domestic violence remains widespread, driven by poverty, social isolation, gender inequality, and weak institutional responses.

== Types of abuse ==
=== Physical violence ===
==== Dowry deaths ====
Dowry deaths have been described by the United Nations as a form of domestic violence in Pakistan. Women are often attacked and murdered if their in-laws deem their dowry insufficient. Amongst dowry-related violence, bride burnings, also known as "stove deaths", are widely reported. A 1988 survey showed 800 women were killed in this manner, in 1989 the number rose to 1,100, and in 1990 it stood at 1,800 estimated killings. According to the Progressive Women's Association such attacks are a growing problem and, in 1994 on International Women's Day, announced various NGOs would join to raise awareness of the issue. In 1997, Lahore newspapers reported on average 15 attacks a month over a six-month interval. Women's eNews reported 4,000 women had been attacked in this manner in Islamabad's surroundings over an eight-year period, and that the average age range of victims was between 18 and 35, with 30 percent pregnant at time of death. The Human Rights Commission of Pakistan reported that four women are killed in this manner every day, by either family members or husbands. Shahnaz Bukhari, who runs the Progressive Women's Association in Islamabad, noted "Either Pakistan is home to possessed stoves which burn only young housewives, and are particularly fond of genitalia, or looking at the frequency with which these incidences occur there is a grim pattern that these women are victims of deliberate murder."

==== Acid attacks ====
Acid attacks in Pakistan came to international attention after the release of a documentary by Sharmeen Obaid-Chinoy called Saving Face (2012). According to Shahnaz Bukhari, the most occur in the summer, when acid is commonly used to soak certain seeds to induce germination. Various reasons have been given for attacks, such as a victim dressing inappropriately or rejecting a marriage proposal. The first acid attack occurred in East Pakistan in 1967. According to the Acid Survivors Foundation, up to 150 attacks occur every year. The foundation reports that most victims are female and the attacks are often the result of an escalation of domestic abuse.

==== Honour killing ====
A recent report noted that one in five homicides in Pakistan are honour killings. The prevalence of such honour killings that have been reported are around 2,000 killings every four years. Overall, out of all homicides of both men and women in Pakistan, honour killings of women constitute 21%. Moreover, the perpetrator in most honour killings is the husband. One study found as high as 92% of all honour killings are committed by the spouse. The highest occurring reason in spousal honour killings was alleged extramarital affairs. Much of the data has been collected by the Human Rights Commission of Pakistan through newspaper reports, however, it is clear there needs to be more systematic research by a health agency is needed to assess this public health crisis and effectively plan for solutions as many cases go unreported. Another analysis of this research states that a possible explanation of the high rate of honour killings towards married women could be attributed to the generally high statistics of domestic violence in Pakistan.

=== Psychological abuse ===
Psychological abuse generally includes yelling, insulting, controlling behaviors, and threatening. In a study by Zakar et al., of 373 randomly selected married women of reproductive age interviewed in Pakistani hospitals, 60.8% reported as current victims of severe psychological violence with 15% having been victims in the past. The percentage of women going through current psychological violence far surpassed the percentages of women going through current sexual (27.3%) and physical (21.7%) violence. Moreover, more than half of these participants, 54%, reported being currently in a poor state of mental health.

== Factors ==
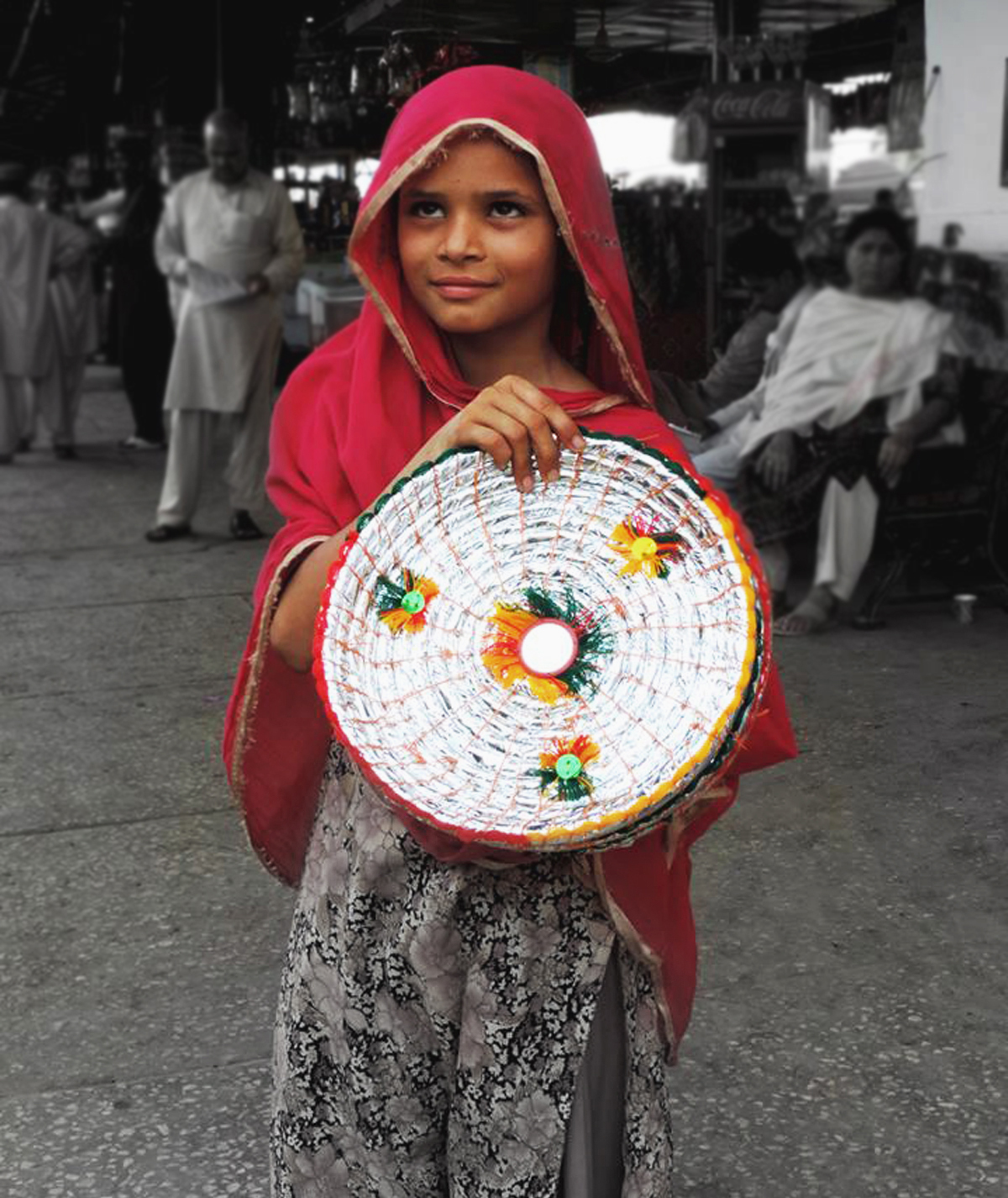
A young girl in a rural area of the Sindh province of Pakistan is selling these baskets her family has made for a living.

=== Poverty ===
Associated with poverty is illiteracy and social stigma against domestic violence. Lack of an education due to financial reasons diminishes awareness of women’s rights. Moreover, because mental health illiteracy is especially widespread in low-income areas, many women do not receive appropriate treatment after experiencing domestic violence.

=== Patriarchalism ===
Another reason given for abuses is patriarchalism in Pakistani society, which marginalizes the role of women. In some traditional societies, a man is considered to have the right to physically beat his spouse on his wish. According to Rahel Nardos "the dual constructs of women as the property of men and as the standard-bearers of a family's honour set the stage for culturally sanctioned forms of violence". In some cases, women perpetuate patriarchalism and domestic abuse especially in regard to mothers-in-law. Many women are expected to be homemakers and to perform key household duties. However, if a woman is not performing her duties by her mother-in-law's standards, the mother-in-law may seek to punish the woman through her son.

In analysis of data from 3,867 married or previously married women from the 2012-2013 Pakistan Demographic and Health Survey, association was found between the intergenerational transfer of spousal violence and cultural views of women. Strikingly, 47% of these women agreed that beating of a spouse was justified if the wife had argued with her husband. Statistics such as this prove that patriarchalism within the Pakistani society has led many Pakistani women to believe that domestic violence is normal or even at times justified. This idea is enforced by a study done of 759 Pakistani women between the ages of 25 and 60 years old in which 27% admitted they had never told anyone of the spousal violence they had endured or were currently enduring.

=== Child marriage ===
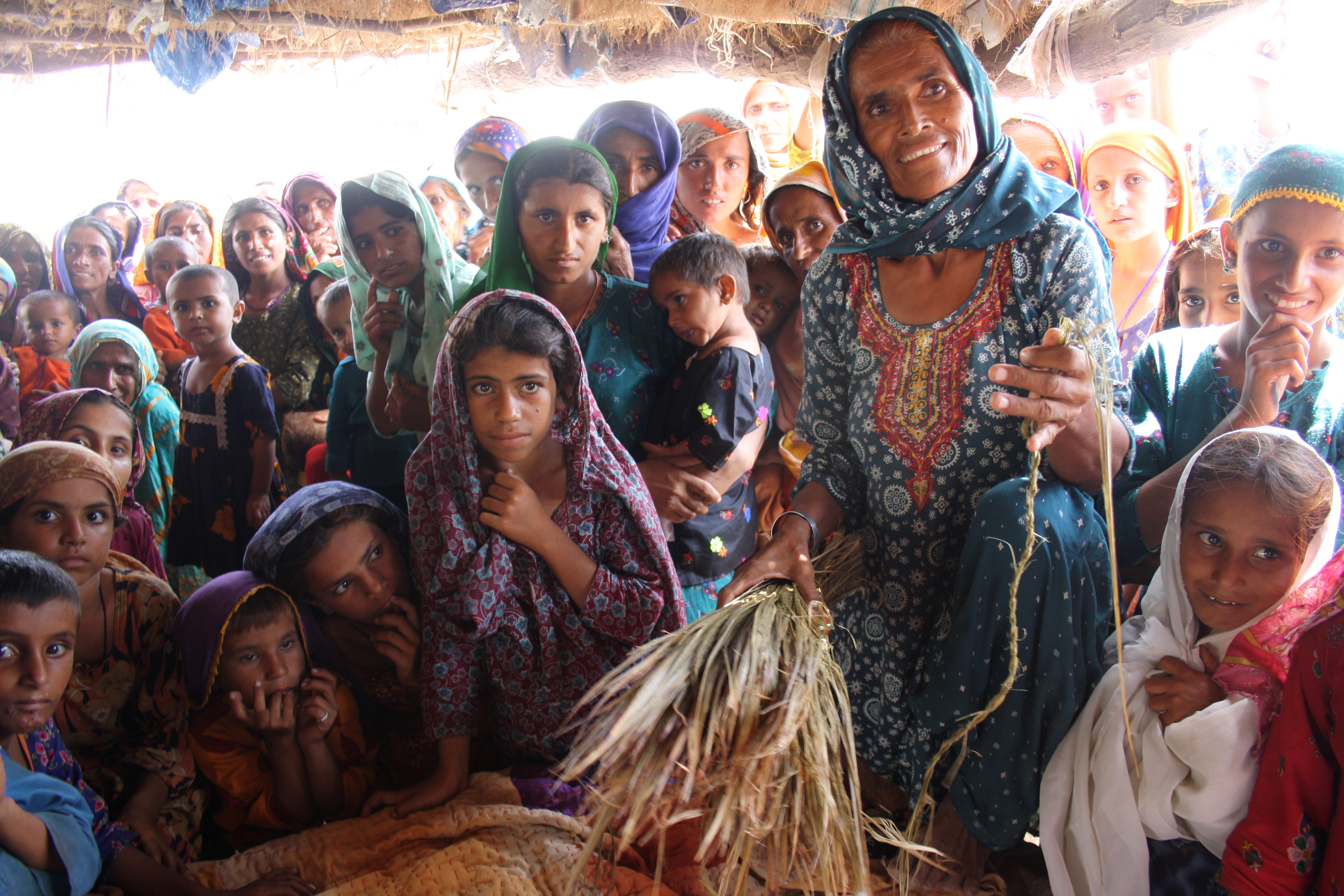
Women and girls in Qamber, Shadadkot, north-west Sindh, Pakistan (8406155976)

Defined as marriage before the age of 18 years, child marriage is widespread in Pakistan and linked to spousal violence. Child marriage occurs most often in rural and low-income households where education is minimal. The Pakistan Demographic and Health Survey conducted from 2012 to 2013 reported that 47.5% of currently married women aged 15 to 24 had been married before the age of 18. Moreover, of those child marriages, one-third of those women reported spousal violence.

=== Marriages within the extended family ===
Consanguineous marriages, or those within blood relations such as first and second cousins, are considered marriages in biraderi, or brotherhood, within many Pakistani subcultures. Based on reported research, about two-thirds of all Pakistani marriages are within families. Analysis of a Pakistani Health Demographic Survey from 2012 to 2013 showed that women in consanguineous marriages are more likely to face psychological domestic abuse. However, findings in this study also reported the prevalence of domestic violence within the larger Pakistani population as well.

=== Increased urbanization ===
Another factor given for the rise in domestic violence has been due to increased urbanization. As people move from villages and increasingly live apart from an extended family, assaults are less likely to be prevented by the intervention of family members, who in past times often intervened in domestic conflicts. In particular, women who move cities or areas after marriage away from their respective family are more at risk for domestic violence. These women are left without parental or familial support as the only contacts they have are now limited to their husband and husband's family. Violent spousal relationships are perpetuated by isolation of the victim and lack of social support.

== Impact on women ==
=== Physical and psychological health outcomes ===
Domestic violence leads to increased risk towards certain health outcomes like major depression, dysthymia, conduct disorder, and drug abuse. Moreover, because women are primary caretakers in Pakistan, children also face increased risk for depression and behavioural problems. Zakar et al. found in their study that of those interviewed (373 women from Pakistani hospitals) including women who had experienced severe domestic violence, 54% reported poor current mental health. Associated with this self-reported statistic of women in a poor state of mental health was also a high prevalence of mental health disorders with anxiety and depression being the most common.

In particular, physical violence has long-term, negative psychological impacts on women with stigma against mental health serving as an impediment to treatment. Physical violence may cause permanent disfigurement and ailments leading to a variety of psychological disorders, such as depression. Women are often unable to receive treatment for psychological disorders as mental health within the cultural realm of Pakistan is not considered a health matter. Mental health illiteracy leads to treatment of mental health disorders superstitiously or not at all.

Another study that examined domestic violence and pregnancy among Pakistani women found that 51% of respondents reported experiencing domestic violence in the six months prior to or after pregnancy. The researchers of this study and others have suggested due to the prevalence of domestic violence in pregnant women that domestic violence be screened for during antenatal care.

=== Bargaining power ===
Women in domestic violence relationships often have no recourse of escaping due to fear of murder from the perpetrator. A vivid example of this is the practice of watta satta, or bride exchange, whereby a daughter from one family is swapped for a daughter of another in a brother-sister pair. Power dynamics between the families follow a revenge-based model. If a husband is harsh on his wife then the mutual threat exists of the husband's brother-in-law being harsh on his sister. These reciprocal threats leave women in positions with little to no bargaining power. This leaves women in a position where they cannot escape a marriage because of cross bride exchange family entanglement. Adding to the complexity, divorce is also highly stigmatized within the Pakistani culture.

Bargaining power of women in domestic violence relationships is also minimal due to residence with the husband's family. Particularly, in rural areas, if a woman in a domestic violence relationship is living with her husband's family, she has little recourse to seek help or escape. Studies on attitudes of domestic violence in Pakistan have shown that though these families in rural areas may wish to help their daughter, it is costly to continuously visit her. In other cases, domestic violence perpetrator families have been shown to taunt or ridicule those seeking justice.

== Policy initiatives ==
=== General legislation against domestic violence ===
In 2009 a Domestic Violence Protection bill was proposed by Yasmeen Rehman of the Pakistan People’s Party. It was passed in the National Assembly but subsequently failed to be passed in the second chamber of parliament, the Senate, within the prescribed period of time. The Council of Islamic Ideology objected to the bill, claiming that in its current form it will increase divorces and argued that the bill considered women and children the only victims of domestic violence, ignoring elderly and weak men. The council claimed that the punishments suggested by the bill were already enacted by other laws and suggested lack of action on these laws as the reason for increase in domestic violence. After the passage of Eighteenth constitutional amendment, the matter pertaining to the bill became a provincial issue. It was re-tabled in 2012, but met with a deadlock in parliament because of stiff opposition from the religious right. Representatives of Islamic organizations vowed resistance to the proposed bill, describing it as "anti-Islamic" and an attempt to promote "Western cultural values" in Pakistan. They asked for the bill to be reviewed before being approved by the parliament. The bill was passed for Islamabad Capital Territory.

=== Specific legislation against certain offenses ===
==== Dowry deaths ====
In 1976 the Pakistani government passed legislation on dowry and bridal gifts in an attempt to eliminate the custom but, because of cultural and societal norms combined with government ineffectiveness, such killings over inadequate dowries continue.

==== Acid attacks ====
In 1999 the Senate of Pakistan rejected a resolution which would have condemned the practice of murdering women for the sake of family honour. In 2011 the Senate passed the Acid Control and Acid Crime Prevention Bill to repress acid attacks in the country; the senate also passed the Prevention of Anti-Women Practices bill.

==== Honour killing ====
On April 21, 2001, the national government leader Pervez Musharraf declared that honour killings were "vigorously condemned" by the government and would be treated as murder. The Ministry of Women Development set up ten crisis centres to help victims of domestic violence and raise public awareness. Particularly in 2004, Pakistan's Criminal Law (Amendment) Act passed that provided legal protection for women against any offense committed by family members for the sake of honour. However, Pakistan's legal system has done little to uphold this legislation. The National Commission on the Status of Women reports that Pakistan is doing little to bring justice to perpetrators. If the family of the victim forgives the perpetrator, then the perpetrator will be set free despite clear violation of Pakistani law. Oftentimes, families who are caught in an honour killing case come from rural areas where families must work together in a village on the daily to live. When an honour killing occurs, the family of the victim are highly likely to forgive the perpetrator based on what elders of the village advise them to do.

== Support organizations ==
From both international and internal funding, there are a variety of NGO's that provide support to women who have endured or are enduring domestic violence in Pakistan.

- Bedari (funded by United Nations Development Programme)
- White Ribbon Campaign Pakistan
- Lawyers for Human Rights and Legal Aid - LHRLA
- Madadgaar National Helpline 1098
- War Against Rape Pakistan
- Acid Survivors Foundation Pakistan
- Chayn

== See also ==
- Forced conversion of minority girls in Pakistan
- Acid throwing
- Child marriage
- Dowry death
- Domestic violence
- Honour killing
- Honour killing in Pakistan
- Honour killing of Sadia Sheikh
- Honour killing of Ghazala Khan
- Rape in Pakistan
- Violence against women in Pakistan
