= Nazim Baksh =

Canadian journalist

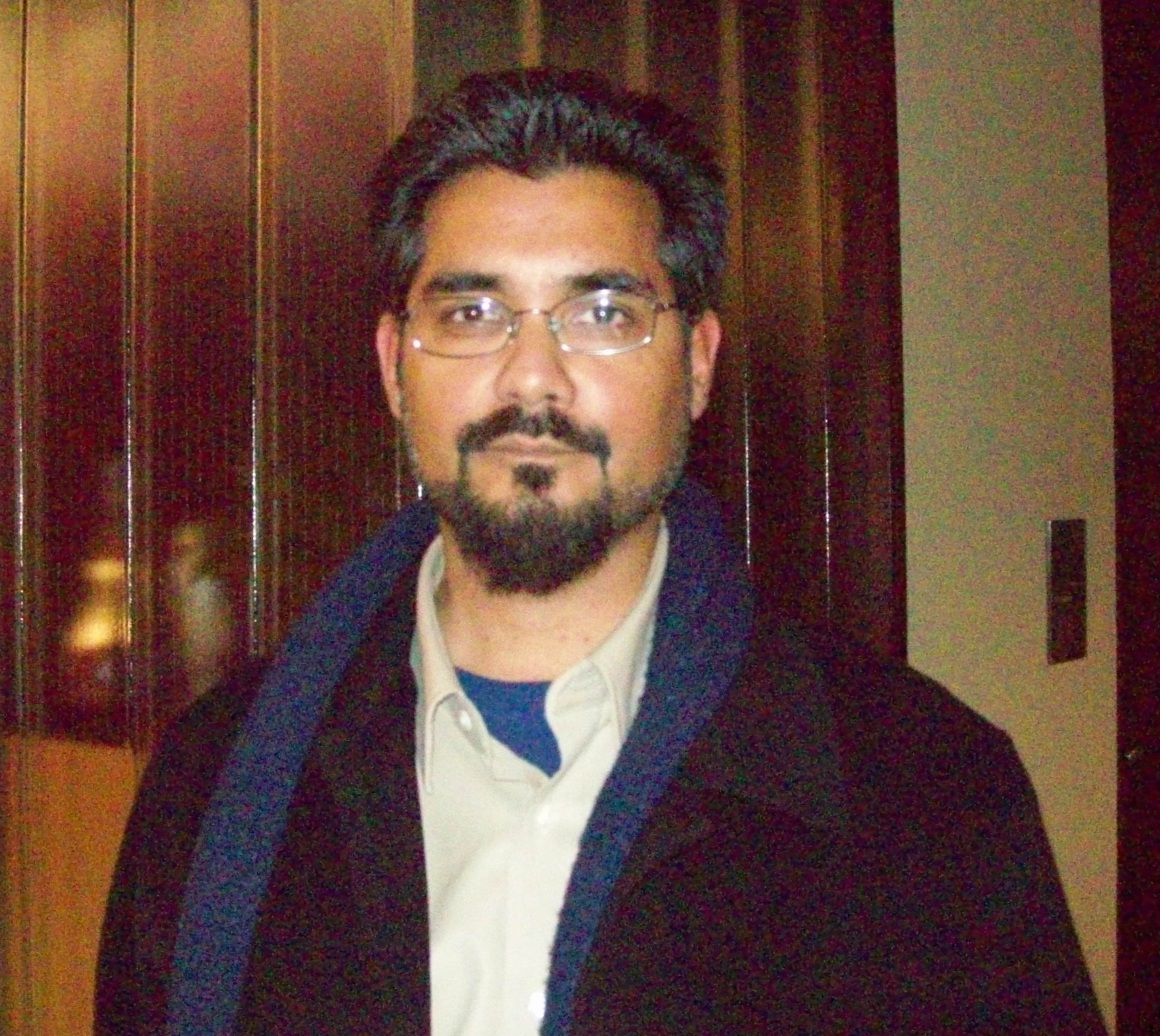
- Known for: Award winning producer

Nazim Ahmed Baksh is a Canadian journalist and television producer. He is noteworthy for producing the documentary Son of al Qaeda, about Canadian youth Abdurahman Khadr.

In 2006 the University of Toronto invited Baksh to serve an eight-month fellowship in its Journalism program.

Baksh, Linden MacIntyre and Neil Docherty won an award from the Canadian Association of Journalists for a segment entitled The Mole that appeared on CBC News The National in 2007. In 2011 Baksh and John Lancaster won a Canadian Association for Journalists award for "Death in a Community."

== Education ==
Education
	B.A. Political Science	York University
1991	Masters Journalism	University of Western Ontario

== Career in journalism ==
Baksh was hired by the Canadian Broadcasting Corporation in 1990, following earning his Masters in Journalism, and has worked there, in one capacity or other, since. His accomplishments there include:

Dispatches	Baksh was a founding producer, and long-time contributor to this weekly radio show on international issues.
Son of al Qaeda	Baksh was one of the producers of this profile of a Canadian youth who was captured in Afghanistan, served as a CIA informant, agreed to serve as a mole in Guantanamo.
A Secret History of 9/11	Baksh helped produce this documentary for the fifth anniversary of al Qaeda's attacks on September 11, 2001.
Nuclear Jihad
Land, Gold and Women	Baksh was a consulting producer for this documentary about the traditional social control of women in rural Pakistan.
The USA v. Omar Khadr	First broadcast as part of CBC's Doc Zone series on October 17, 2008.
