= The Secret History of 9/11 =

2006 television documentary film

The Secret History of 9/11 is a documentary which aired on CBC Television on September 12, 2006, to mark the fifth anniversary of the September 11, 2001 terrorist attacks. Written and directed by Terence McKenna, it includes interviews with a number of key people including the Chief of Counter-terrorism at the White House Richard Clarke, the head of the CIA Bin Laden Unit Michael Scheuer, members of the 9/11 Commission including Chairman Thomas Kean and Vice-Chairman Lee H. Hamilton and Marc H. Sasseville, the U.S. fighter pilot who was prepared to fly his unarmed F-16 into a hijacked aircraft.
