= Habiba Nosheen =

Habiba Nosheen حبیبہ نوشین
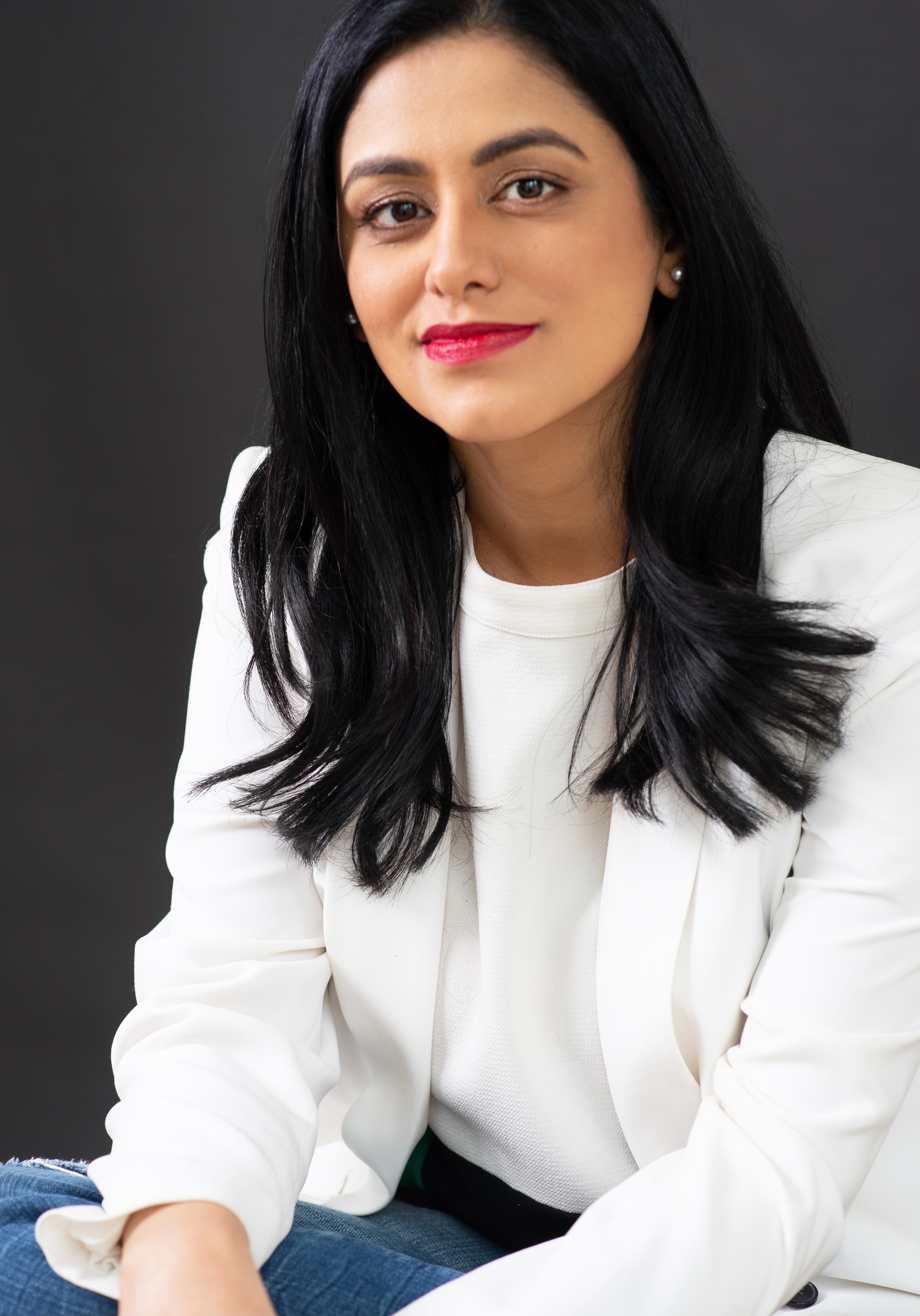
- Born: Habiba Nosheen; Lahore, Pakistan
- Occupation: Investigative journalist

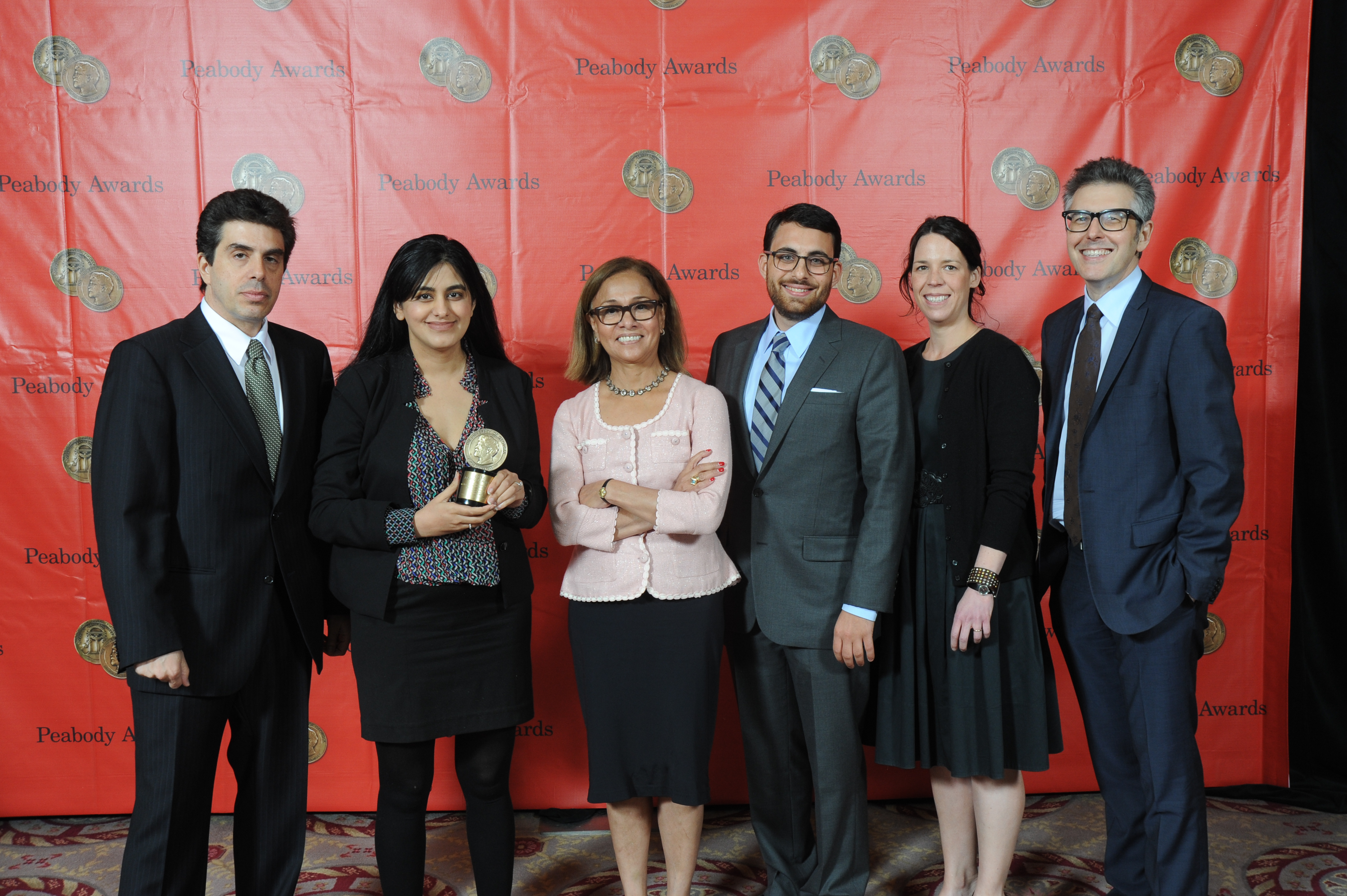
A Peabody Award for "What Happened at Dos Erres?" Sebastian Rotella, Habiba Nosheen, Ana Arana, Brian Reed, Julie Snyder and Ira Glass

Habiba Nosheen (Urdu: حبیبہ نوشین) is an investigative journalist. Her film Outlawed in Pakistan premiered at Sundance Film Festival in 2013 and was called "among the standouts" of Sundance by the Los Angeles Times. A longer version of the film aired on PBS Frontline. Nosheen's 2012 radio documentary, "What Happened at Dos Erres?" aired on This American Life and was called "a masterpiece of storytelling" by The New Yorker.

Nosheen has received numerous awards for her reporting including the Peabody, three Emmy awards.

In 2017-2019, Nosheen was the co-host of CBC Television's newsmagazine series The Fifth Estate. She was the first person of colour to be named the co-host of The Fifth Estate in three decades.

In 2022, Nosheen released an 8 part investigative podcast series with Spotify and Gimlet Media called Conviction: The Disappearance of Nuseiba Hasan. The podcast is a three year long investigation into the disappearance of a Canadian woman who vanished in 2006 without a trace.

In 2026, Nosheen released the feature documentary The Gymnasts of Fisherman Colony with executive producers Malala Yousafzai and Mariskay Hargitay. The film premiered at the Tribeca 2026 Festival.

== Early life ==
Nosheen was born in Lahore, Pakistan. Her family moved to Toronto, Canada when she was nine. She received her master's degree from Columbia University's Graduate School of Journalism and a master's degree from York University, Toronto in Women's Studies. She obtained a bachelor's degree from University of Toronto. She is fluent in English, Urdu, Hindi and Punjabi.

== Career ==
Nosheen's reporting has appeared in various news outlets, including The New York Times, The Washington Post, Time, Glamour, BBC, CBC, PBS, NPR and This American Life. Nosheen's documentaries have been supported by The Fund for Investigative Journalism, The Pulitzer Center on Crisis Reporting, The Nation Institute's Investigative Fund and ITVS. She has taught at Columbia University's Graduate School of Journalism.

In March 2022, Nosheen released a three year long investigation into the disappearance of a Hamilton woman in a 8 part Gimlet Media podcast called Conviction: The Disappearance of Nuseiba Hasan.

== Awards ==
- Winner of Emmy Award (2013) for the film, Outlawed in Pakistan
- Winner of Emmy Award (2016) for 60 Minutes investigation, The Swiss Leaks
- Winner of Emmy Award (2017) for 60 Minutes report, The Hostage The Gracie Award
- Overseas Press Club Award's "THE DAVID A. ANDELMAN and PAMELA TITLE AWARD" for Outlawed in Pakistan
- The South Asian Journalist Association Award
- The Morton Mintz Award
- The Leslie Sanders Award
- The IRE finalist
- The Best Canadian Spectrum at HotDocs International Documentary Festival. She was part of the team that won that award)
- A Finalist for 2012 Casey Medal for Meritorious Journalism

== Notable Works ==
=== Films ===
- Outlawed in Pakistan (2013)
- The Devil's Advocate (2021)
- The Gymnasts of Fisherman Colony (2026)

=== Radio/Podcast ===
- This American Life: What Happened at Dos Erres (2012)
- The Disappearance of Nuseiba Hasan (2022)

== See also ==
- List of Pakistani journalists
