= Whiteness Project =

Whiteness Project: Inside the White/Caucasian Box
- Directed by: Whitney Dow
- Release date: 2014

Whiteness Project: Inside the White/Caucasian Box is a 2014 interactive documentary investigating how Americans who identify as “white” experience their ethnicity. Created by documentary filmmaker Whitney Dow and produced in association with American Documentary | POV, the project plans to conduct 1,000 interviews with white people from all socioeconomic backgrounds and localities in which they are questioned about “their relationship to, and their understanding of their own whiteness.”

"Whiteness Project: Inside the White/Caucasian Box" is the first installment of a proposed larger project. It is a collection of 21 interviews filmed in Buffalo, NY in July 2014. A statistic at the end of each interview introduces verified information that reveals how participants’ perception lines up with relevant demographic information, research and data.

The latest installment, "Intersection of I", is a collection of 23 interviews filmed in Dallas, Texas in July 2015 and released in April 2016. This second installment features a cross-section of Millennials ages 15–27, who share their views about race and identity. Intersection of I was an installation at the Tribeca 2016 Festival Hub.

== Story ==
In the official artistic statement, Whitney Dow notes that “while many media projects have investigated the history, culture, and experience of various American minorities, there has been much less examination of how white Americans think about and experience their whiteness and how white culture shapes our society.” Whiteness Project aims to examine the concept of whiteness and how white people process their ethnic identity in a multi-platform media project. The goal of the project is to prompt a productive debate about the role of whiteness in America and urge white Americans to become fully invested in the debate about the role of race in America.

== Production ==
Whiteness Project was spearheaded by Whitney Dow and his production company Two-Tone Production (co-founded by Marco Williams), in association with POV. The website was designed and developed by Studio Kudos Strategy, Design and Development. Critical Collaborators on the project include Michael Rock from 2X4 and Marco Williams from HipTruth Productions. The first installment of the Whiteness Project was shot in Buffalo, NY in July 2014, while the second installment was shot in Dallas, TX in July 2015.
