= Terence McKenna (film producer) =

Canadian filmmaker

- Born: March 14, 1954 (age 72); Montreal, Quebec
- Occupation: journalist
- Spouse: Sara Caudwell
- Children: 4

Terence McKenna is a Canadian documentary filmmaker. He has collaborated with his brother Brian McKenna, also a filmmaker.

In 2007, McKenna won the Pierre Berton award.

== Meltdown: The Secret History of the Global Financial Collapse ==
In the CBC series Doc Zone, McKenna investigated the history of the global financial collapse from "backrooms at the highest levels of world governments and banking institutions," and "from Wall Street to Dubai to China which began in September 2008. The series included "After the Fall", "Paying the Price", "A Global Tsunami", "The Men who Crashed the World".

== Partial filmography ==
- Meltdown: The Secret History of the Global Financial Collapse
- The Secret History of 9/11, 2006
- Land, Gold and Women, 2006
- Son of al Qaeda, 2004
- Life and Times of John Paul II, 2003
- Korea: The Unfinished War, 2003
- Trail of a Terrorist, 2001
- Black October (film), 2000
- The Valour and the Horror, 1992
- The Squamish Five, 1989
