= In Search of My Sister =

2022 film directed by Jawad Mir

- Directed by: Jawad Mir
- Produced by: Hemal Trivedi
- Cinematography: Roger Singh
- Edited by: Hemal Trived; Jawad Mir
- Music by: David Fesliyan
- Production company: Sky Blue Productions
- Release date: 2022
- Running time: 80 minutes
- Country: United States
- Languages: English; Uyghur

In Search of My Sister is a 2022 documentary by Jawad Mir about Uyghur-American activist Rushan Abbas, the persecution of Uyghurs in China and her sister's detention by China. The film was screened at various U.S. Embassies, in Brussels and for members of the U.S. Congress.

== Synopsis ==
Uyghur-American activist Rushan Abbas, who founded Campaign for Uyghurs in 2017, attempts to seek clarity about the whereabouts of her sister Gulshan, a retired doctor living in Xianjiang, after she goes missing in 2018. The film features interviews with Rushan Abbas' husband Abdulhakim Idris, Gulshan Abbas' daughter Ziba Murat, Uyghur activist Dolkun Isa, German anthropologist Adrian Zenz and CGTV columnist Einar Tangen, who provides a pro-CCP perspective. It ends with Chinese Foreign Ministry spokesperson Wang Wenbin formally acknowledging the prison sentence of Gulshan Abbas in 2020.

== Release ==
The film was screened in Brussels in 2022 ahead of the Winter Olympics in Beijing. In 2023, it was scheduled to be screened at the Jana Cekara Film Festival in Almaty, Kazakhstan, alongside other films about Uyghurs, but the screening was cancelled. According to Abbas' testimony at a hearing of the Congressional-Executive Commission on China, the supposed reason for the cancellation were visits by Chinese diplomats to the venue.

The U.S. State Department screened the film at a number of their embassies, including in Austria, Portugal and Germany. Congressman Chris Smith recalled being shown the film by Congressman Tom Suazzi and called it "very moving", saying about the screening that "we ought to do it again here on Capitol Hill".

The film was released on demand on vimeo, where the movie is listed as unavailable in China. It was later released on tubi and Amazon Prime Video.
