= Mukhtar Mai =

Pakistani rape survivor and human rights activist

Mukhtār Mā'ī
- مختار مائی
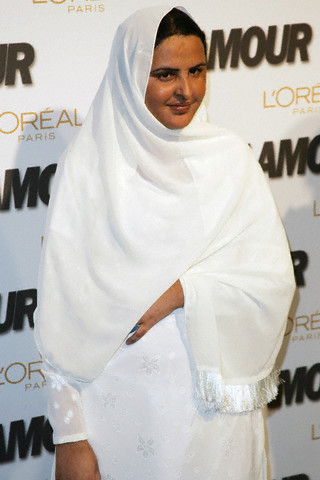
- Mai at Glamour magazine's 2005 Woman of the Year event
- Born: Mukhtaran Bibi c. 1972 (age 52–53); Meerwala, Punjab, Pakistan
- Occupation: Human rights activist
- Known for: Activism after surviving a honour gang-rape sanctioned by a local tribal council
- Spouse: Nasir Abbas Gabol (m. 2009)

Mukhtaran Bibi (Urdu: مختاراں بی بی; born c. 1972), now known as Mukhtār Mā'ī, is a Pakistani human rights activist from the village of Meerwala, located in the rural tehsil of Jatoi in the Muzaffargarh District of Punjab, Pakistan. In June 2002, Mā'ī was the victim of a gang-rape sanctioned by a tribal council of the local Mastoi clan, as a form of 'honour revenge'; the council ruling was a result of a dispute between the wealthier Mastoi Baloch clan and Mā'ī's Tatla caste.

Although local custom would expect her to commit suicide after being raped, Mā'ī spoke up and pursued a case against her rapists, which was picked up by both domestic and international media. On 1 September 2002, an anti-terrorism court sentenced six men, including the four rapists, to death for rape. However, in 2005, the Lahore High Court cited "insufficient evidence" and subsequently acquitted five of the six convicted rapists, while commuting the punishment of the sixth man to a life sentence. Mā'ī and the government appealed this decision, leading the Supreme Court of Pakistan to suspend the acquittal and hold hearings for an appeal; In April 2011, the Supreme Court set aside the acquittals of four of the men, but confirmed the acquittal of the other five. Mukhataran Bibi's attorney and supporters planned an appeal of the verdict.

Though the safety of Mā'ī and her family and friends has been in jeopardy since the incident, she remains an outspoken advocate for women's rights in Pakistan and elsewhere. She started the Mukhtar Mai Women's Welfare Organization to help support and educate women in rural areas throughout Pakistan. In April 2007, Mā'ī won the North–South Prize from the Council of Europe. In 2005, Glamour magazine named her 'Woman of the Year'. According to a 2006 The New York Times report, "Her autobiography is the No. 3 best seller in France, and movies are being made about her. She has been praised by dignitaries like Laura Bush and the French foreign minister". However, on 8 April 2007, The New York Times reported that Mā'ī lives in fear for her life due to threats from the Pakistani government and local feudal lords. Former President of Pakistan, Pervez Musharraf has admitted on his personal blog that he placed restrictions on her movement in 2005, as he was fearful that her work and the publicity it received would hurt the international image of Pakistan.

== Rape ==
Mai's 12-year-old brother, Abdul Shakoor (or Shakur Tatla) of Tatla caste was abducted by three Baloch men of Mastoi clan. He was taken to a sugar field where he was gang raped and sodomized repeatedly. When the boy refused to stay silent about the incident, he was kept imprisoned in the home of Abdul Khaliq, a Mastoi man. When police came to investigate, Shakoor was accused of having an affair with Khaliq's sister, Salma Naseen, who was in her late 20s at the time. Shakoor was then arrested on charges of adultery but later released. In later trials, Shakoor's rapists were convicted of sodomy and sentenced to five years of imprisonment.

The Mastoi tribal council (jirga) convened separately regarding Shakoor's alleged affair with Naseen. They concluded that Shakoor should marry Naseen while Mai be married to a Mastoi man. Villagers rejected this conclusion due to the belief that adultery must be punished with adultery. Mai was called to the council to apologize to the Mastoi tribe for her brother's actions. When she arrived, she was dragged to a nearby hut where she was gang raped in retaliation by four Mastoi men while an additional 10 people watched. Following the rape, she was paraded nude through the village. Her clothes were presented as evidence in court and following the medical examination of Mukhtaran and chemical analysis of her clothes at least two semen stains were revealed.

== Media coverage ==
In the following days, the story became headline news in Pakistan, and remained so for months. By 3 July, the BBC had picked up on the story. Time magazine ran a story on the case on 15 July 2002.

== Government reactions ==
The Government of Pakistan awarded Mukhtaran with a sum of 500,000 rupees (4518 U.S. dollars) on 5 July 2002. Mukhtaran reportedly told Attiya Inayatullah, the Women's Development Minister who gave her the cheque that she "would have committed suicide if the government had not come to her help."

=== Exit-Control List ===
On 10 June 2005, shortly before she was scheduled to fly to London on the invitation of Amnesty International, Mukhtaran was put on Pakistan's Exit Control List (ECL), a list of people prohibited from traveling abroad, a move that prompted protest in Pakistan and around the world. Pervez Musharraf was out of the country in Australia and New Zealand, but admitted to the press that he had placed Mukhtaran on the blacklist, because he did not "want to project a bad image of Pakistan". Although Pakistan had claimed that Mukhtaran had decided on her own not to go to the U.S., because her mother was sick (which she was not), Musharraf in effect acknowledged that this was a lie.

On 12 June 2005 Mukhtaran was abruptly asked by the government to travel to Lahore to meet with provincial assembly member Shagufta Anwar, and then go to Islamabad to meet with Presidential advisor, Nilofer Bakhtiar. Mukhtaran stated that she did not know the purpose of the trip but knew that she would be meeting "one Shagufta and in Islamabad the PM’s adviser". She again criticized the police personnel assigned at her residence in Meerwala, saying that they had made life miserable for her and her family, and that her aide Naseem was denied exit from Mukhtaran's house. Furthermore, the local police were pressing her to surrender her passport, coinciding with an invitation extended by an organization of Pakistani doctors in North America for Mukhtaran to attend a moot being organized there that month to discuss the state of women and human rights in Pakistan. Mukhtaran observed that "I think the government does not want me to attend that moot (..) for this reason, perhaps, my name has been put on the Exit Control List".

On 13 June following a lunch at the Chief Minister's House in Lahore, she left for Islamabad with Bakhtiar's secretary assigned to 'escort' her. Contact with Mukhtaran could not be established to know the purpose of her visit to Lahore, because her cellular phone did not respond for hours.

On 14 June 2005, at a press conference in Islamabad, Mukhtaran demanded removal of her name from the Exit Control List, and also complained that she was "virtually under house arrest" because of the large police contingent assigned to protect her.

Asma Jahangir, a Pakistani human rights lawyer confirmed that Mukhtaran had been taken to Islamabad, furiously berated and told that Musharraf was very angry with her. She was led sobbing to detention at a secret location and barred from contacting anyone, including her lawyer. Jahangir said Mukhtaran was in illegal custody.

=== Passport confiscated ===
On 19 June 2005, The New York Times columnist Nicholas D. Kristof reported that as Mai returned from the US embassy in Islamabad, after getting her passport stamped with a US visa, it was "confiscated" by Musharraf's government, they were claiming she was now free to travel to the U.S., and removing her name from the ECL, thus rendering her unable to travel outside the country. A column by Khalid Hasan in Pakistan's Daily Times called the government's actions "folly" and "ham-fisted", and said that it had "failed abjectly" to support the liberal "convictions it claims to have" with actions. Mai has since refused to talk about what happened in Islamabad, when she withdrew her application for a visa to the United States or who had taken her passport.

On 27 June 2005 Mukhtaran's passport was returned to her.

On 29 June 2005, on his official website, Musharraf wrote that "Mukhtaran Mai is free to go wherever she pleases, meet whoever she wants and say whatever she pleases."

== Legal case ==
=== Anti-Terrorist Court ===
Mukhtaran's attackers, and the Mastoi of the so-called panchayat that conspired in her rape, were sentenced to death by the Dera Ghazi Khan Anti-Terror Court (ATC) in 2002. The ATC venue was ruled appropriate in this case because the Mastoi had intimidated and terrorized (and continue to threaten) Mukhtaran's Tatla Clan and the people of the area. The court convicted six men (four rapists and two of the village jurors) and sentenced them to death on 1 September 2002. Eight other accused men were released. Mai filed an appeal with the Multan bench of the Lahore high court against the acquittal of the eight men set free on 3 September 2002.

Mai went on to become a symbol for advocates for the health and security of women in her region, attracting both national and international attention to these issues. Mukhtaran used the compensation money awarded by the Pakistani government as well as donations from around the world to build two local schools for girls.

=== Appeal and the Lahore High Court ===
On 3 March, the Lahore High Court reversed the judgement by the trial court on the basis of "insufficient evidence" and subsequently five of the six men sentenced to death were acquitted. The Pakistani government decided to appeal the acquittal, and Mukhtaran asked the court not to order the release of the five men, who then remained in detention under a law that allows for a 90-day detention without charges.

=== Legal representation ===
Mukhtaran has been represented by panels of lawyers. One such team is headed by Pakistan's Attorney General, Makhdoom Ali Khan. Another panel is led by Aitzaz Ahsan, a lawyer and politician belonging to the Pakistan Peoples Party, who has been representing Mukhtaran pro bono. However, her rapists were found not guilty. Advocate Malik Muhammad Saleem won this case against Mukhtaran and the accused were released. The Federal Sharia Court in Pakistan decided to suspend this decision of Lahore High Court on 11 March, arguing that Mai's case should have been tried under the Islamic Hudood laws. Three days later the Supreme Court ruled that the Federal Sharia Court did not have the authority to overrule the decision and decided to hear the case in the Supreme Court.

=== Retrial of rapists ===
The Lahore high court ruled on 6 June 2005 that the accused men could be released on payment of a 50,000 rupees ($840) bond. However, the men were unable to come up with the money, and remained in jail while the prosecution appealed against their acquittal. Just over two weeks later, the Supreme Court intervened and suspended the acquittals of five men as well as the eight who were acquitted at the original trial in 2002. All 14 were retried in the Supreme Court.

On 21 April 2011, the Supreme Court set aside the Lahore High Court's acquittal of A. Ditta, Ghulam Farid, Faiz Mastoi and Ramzan Parchar. However the Supreme Court confirmed the acquittal of Khalil Ahmad, Ghulam Hussain, Qasim Rasool, Hazoor and Nazar Hussain for being falsely implicated by Mukhtar Mai. Mukhataran Bibi's attorney and supporters planned and to file a review petition against this verdict.

== Threats ==
On 8 April 2007, The New York Times reported that Mukhtaran was living in fear for her life of the Pakistani government and local feudal lords. It also reported that Mukhtaran's friends, colleagues and their families are at great risk from violence by local feudal lords, and/or the government of Pakistan.

== Post-case work ==
Mukhtaran began to work to educate girls, and to promote education with a view towards raising awareness to prevent future honour crimes. Out of this work grew the organization Mukhtar Mai Women's Welfare Organization (MMWWO). The goals of MMWWO are to help the local community, especially women, through education and other projects. The main focus of her work is to educate young girls, and to educate the community about women's rights and gender issues. Her organization teaches young girls, and tries to make sure they stay in school, rather than work or get married. In Fall 2007, a high school will be started by her group. The MMWWO also provides shelter and legal help for people, often women, who are victims of violence or injustice.

== 2009–present ==
On 11 December 2008, Mukhtaran was informed by Sardar Abdul Qayyum, the sitting Federal Minister for Defence Production, to drop the charge against the accused. According to Mukhtaran, the minister called her uncle, Ghulam Hussain, to his place in Jatoi and passed on a message to Mukhtaran that she should drop the charges against the thirteen accused of the Mastoi tribe, who were involved either in the verdict against Mukhtaran, or who gang raped her. The minister said that, if she did not comply, he and his associates would not let the Supreme Court's decision go in favour of Mukhtaran. It is believed that the Mastoi clan have political influence of sufficient weight to bring pressure to bear on the supreme court via establishment and political figures. The Supreme Court of Pakistan had listed Mukhtaran case for hearing in the second week of February 2009 (hearing was expected on 10 or 11 February).

On 11 June 2009, the Multan Electric Power Company raided the MMWWO (Mukhtar Mai's Women Welfare Organization) in Meerwala, Pakistan, disconnecting all electricity to the grounds, falsely accusing the organization of stealing electricity despite records proving they have paid all bills in full. MMWWO and hundreds of families in the surrounding area were without power for several days. Today, while the power to the surrounding area has been restored, the MMWWO grounds, which house the Mukhtaran Girls Model School, Women's Resource Centre, and Shelter Home for battered women (whose premises was raided despite the fact that men are strictly prohibited), are still enduring blistering temperatures. According to MMWWO employees, who were witnesses, the power company officials claimed that the raid was ordered by Abdul Qayyum Jatoi, the Federal Minister for Defense Production. This raid has significantly hindered the ability of Mai's organization to carry out its important human rights work, providing services for vulnerable women, girls and boys.

Hearings for the Supreme Court case have repeatedly been delayed, while her attackers remain imprisoned and her case is pending.

In June 2010, it was reported that Pakistan Peoples Party legislator Jamshed Dasti has threatened Mai to withdraw her appeal in the Supreme Court against the accused rapists. Mai said in an exclusive interview to the Express Tribune that Dasti threatened her last week through his messengers in Mir Wala (Muzaffargarh) and through the supporters of Federal Minister for Defence Production, Sardar Qayyum Jatoi, whose constituency she resides in, is putting pressure on her family in various ways, for example, to remove the police check post from outside their house. She stated her family was living in fear. Dasti, a critic of Mai, confirmed that he had requested her to reach a compromise on the matter.

On 21 April 2011, Malik Saleem, defense lawyer for the men accused of gang-raping Mukhtaran Mai under orders of the Mastoi clan, announced that five have been acquitted by the Supreme Court of Pakistan while the sixth suspect, Abdul Khalique had his life sentence upheld. Although the release of the suspects places Mukhtaran Mai in even greater danger she has vowed not to shut down her school. The Supreme Court's decision shocked and disappointed many Pakistanis, especially human rights activists.

== Awards and acclaim ==
- On 2 August 2005, the Pakistani government awarded Mukhtaran the Fatima Jinnah gold medal for bravery and courage.
- On 2 November 2005, the US magazine Glamour named Mukhtaran as their Woman Of The Year.
- On 12 January 2006, Mukhtaran Mai published her memoir with the collaboration of Marie-Thérèse Cuny under the title Déshonorée. The originating publisher of the book is OH ! Editions in France and her book was published simultaneously in German by Droemer Verlag as Die Schuld, eine Frau zu sein.
- On 16 January 2006, to coincide with the publication of her memoir, Mukhtaran Mai travelled to Paris (France) and was received by Foreign Minister Philippe Douste-Blazy.
- On 2 May 2006, Mukhtaran spoke at the United Nations headquarters in New York. In an interview with United Nations TV, Mai said that "she wanted to get the message across to the world that one should fight for their rights and for the rights of the next generation." She was welcomed by UN Under-Secretary General Shashi Tharoor, who said, “I think it is fair to say that anyone who has the moral courage and internal strength to turn such a brutal attack into a weapon to defend others in a similar position, is a hero indeed, and is worthy of our deepest respect and admiration.”
- On 31 October 2006, Mukhtaran's memoir was released in the United States as In the Name of Honor: A Memoir.
- On 15 November 2006, Pakistan's lower house of Parliament voted to alter its rape laws to move them from religious law to penal code, effectively separating rape from adultery. It also modifies the law to no longer require that the victim produce four witnesses of the assault, and it allows circumstantial and forensic evidence be used for investigation. The bill reduced the penalty for adultery from execution to a maximum of five years' incarceration and a 10,000 rupee fine. A modified version of the bill, called the Protection of Women Bill, was signed by Musharraf in late 2006. Critics of the final version of the law complained that "[a] judge can still decide whether rape cases will be heard in a civil or an Islamic court. Rape victims will have to report their complaints to district courts, not at local police stations, compelling many to travel long distances. As a result, many will be discouraged."
- In March 2007, Mukhtaran formally received the 2006 North-South Prize of the Council of Europe for her contribution to human rights. In April 2007, Mukhtaran Mai won the North-South Prize from the Council of Europe.
- In October 2010, Laurentian University of Canada decided to award an honorary doctorate degree to Mukhtar Mai.

== In popular culture ==
Mukhtaran's memoir was first published in France by Oh! editions under the title Déshonorée. It has been published in 23 languages including English by Atria under the title In the name of honor. Her autobiography ranked #3 on the bestseller list in France and movies about her are in the making. She has been praised by dignitaries like Laura Bush and the French foreign minister.

In 2009 in the book Half the Sky: Turning Oppression into Opportunity for Women Worldwide by Nicholas D. Kristof and Sheryl WuDunn, Mukhtaran was the subject of chapter 4, "Rule by Rape". The book is an exposé about women and gender apartheid.

In 2006, Mukhtaran's experiences were the subject of a documentary called Shame by Mohammed Naqvi, which won multiple awards including the TV Academy Honor (Special Emmy) by the Academy of Television Arts and Sciences.

In 2008 Mukhtaran's experiences were the subject of a documentary by Catherine Ulmer López focusing on the aftermath of the rape especially on Mukhtaran's schools as well as an important look inside Pakistan, "where the impact of Islamic fundamentalism is revealed and how women are fighting its oppressive and violent impact." The documentary was shown at the Starz Denver Festival, the 7th Human Rights Film Festival and the 22nd International Documentary Film Festival Amsterdam in 2009.

In 2014, the chamber opera Thumbprint opened in New York, based on a song cycle that was first performed in 2009. The earlier song cycle was composed by Kamala Sankaram, and Susan Yankowitz helped to transform it into the opera. Sankaram sang the lead role of Mai. Thumbprint made its Los Angeles premiere in June 2017.

== See also ==
- Shazia Khalid
- Kainat Soomro
- Islamic feminism
- Movement to impeach Pervez Musharraf
- Rape in Pakistan
