= Black October (film) =

- Written by: Terence McKenna
- Directed by: Terence McKenna
- Narrated by: Terence McKenna
- Country of origin: Canada
- Original language: English

Production
- Producer: Stephen Phizicky

Original release
- Network: CBC
- Release: October 8, 2000

Black October is a 2000 documentary film written, directed and narrated by Terence McKenna and produced by Stephen Phizicky for CBC television on the October Crisis in Canada which aired in October 2000. It focuses on the autumn of 1970, following the kidnapping of British Trade Commissioner James Cross and Quebec Minister of Labour Pierre Laporte by the Front de libération du Québec in October. The War Measures Act was declared by Prime Minister Pierre Trudeau a day before it was discovered Laporte was executed.

The film includes interviews with Pierre Trudeau, his then Principal Secretary Marc Lalonde, Quebec Minister of Justice Jerome Choquette, then British Trade Commissioner James Cross, and former Le Devoir Editor Claude Ryan who became a key participant in the crisis.

== See also ==
- Action: The October Crisis of 1970, Robin Spry's 1973 documentary film
