= Shazia Khalid =

Pakistani doctor and women's rights activist

Dr. Shazia Khalid
- Born: 1973 (age 52–53); Sindh, Pakistan
- Occupation: Doctor

Shazia Khalid (Sindhi: شازيه خالد) (Urdu: شازیہ خالد) (born 1973) is a medical doctor and advocate of women's human rights from Sui, Pakistan.

== Background ==
Dr. Shazia Khalid is married to Khalid Zafar, a pipeline engineer. In 2005 Dr. Shazia was an employee of Pakistan Petroleum Limited (PPL), and working at the company's Sui hospital for the past 18 months while living alone in accommodation provided by PPL. Security services for the entire facility were provided by the Defence Services Group (DSG). She had taken the job only after PPL had also promised a job for her husband. The job for him, however, never materialized.

== Rape ==
On the night of 2 January and in the early morning hours of 3 January 2005, Dr. Shazia was awoken by somebody pulling her hair. She was then strangled with a cord, threatened, blindfolded, pistol-whipped, beaten, and repeatedly raped by a masked intruder, at Sui, Dera Bugti, in the heavily guarded government-owned natural gas plant. She was severely injured in the attack but managed to cut her hands free of the cord and sought help from a nurse, Sakina, at the nearby nursing hostel. Sakina then informed the administration of PPL and the DCMO; the medical staff on duty, Dr. Mohammad Ali, Dr. Irshad, Dr. Saima Siddiqui, nurse Firdous and Salimullah visited Dr. Shazia. Her pleas to contact her husband (who was working in Libya at the time) and her family were ignored. Instead of treating her medically, officials were said to have drugged her into unconsciousness with sedatives for three days to keep her quiet and then transferred her to a psychiatric hospital, Asghar Psychiatric Hospital, in Karachi.

== House arrest ==
Her husband, Khalid, in Libya at the time, rushed back to Pakistan to be with his wife. With his support, Shazia reported the crime.

Following the report, for a period of 2 months, she was placed under house arrest in a house in Karachi under the "unofficial protection" of the police, army and Musharraf officials and was not allowed access to doctors, lawyers or visitors of her choice. In addition, the crime scene and anything that could be considered as evidence, including the clothes of Dr. Shazia, were tampered with or destroyed. When her family was informed some days later, Dr. Shazia and her family were told to keep quiet and dissuaded to register a rape case or speak to the media by the PPL Company representatives, who denied the occurrence of rape to the media.

Her husband Khalid said, his grandfather demanded that Khalid divorce her, because he felt her rape had rendered her a stain on the family honour. Khalid refused. So the grandfather assembled a mob to kill Shazia.

Her case led to a violent uprising by the Bugti tribe in Baluchistan province, disrupting the supply of gas to much of the country for several weeks. By some accounts, up to 10,000 soldiers and police were brought in to quell the rebellion. As the Pakistani authorities attacked the Bugti, President Musharraf promised that the tribesmen would "not know what hit them." and attacks on the Bugti tribesmen were intensified.

An unusual development occurred, when the then Pakistani President Pervez Musharraf entered the controversy, stating on national television, that the accused officer, named as Captain Hammad, was "not guilty", which led to criticism of Musharraf, a military man himself. Both politicians as well as Pakistani human rights lawyer, Asma Jahangir voiced their criticism and concerns following the statement.

== Threats ==
In an interview with the BBC, Dr. Shazia said that she was threatened many times. "I cannot tell you how many times I was threatened. My life was made impossible. I am still terrified." "My whole career was destroyed, as was my husband's. That was why we left our country." "Instead of getting justice, I was hounded out of Pakistan. I never wanted to leave Pakistan, but had no choice."

Dr. Shazia and her husband alleged that the authorities threatened them and ordered them to leave the country.

== Exile ==
On 18 March 2005, Dr. Shazia and her husband left Pakistan on a flight to London, The United Kingdom. She applied for asylum in Canada, where she has relatives, but her application was refused. In August 2005 New York Times columnist Nicholas D. Kristof wrote several articles about Dr. Shazia's story and urged readers to write to the Canadian minister of citizenship and Immigration asking the Canadian government to reconsider. As of 26 September 2005, Dr. Shazia was still stranded in the UK awaiting the result of her application for asylum in the UK. She expressed great regret in being forced to leave her country, her adopted son and family, her career and life behind for a future unknown.

== Coverage ==
Dr. Shazia Khalid's story is covered in Terence McKenna's documentary about sexual violence in Pakistan, Land, Gold and Women. In the interview with McKenna Shazia was quoted saying "I did not get justice and I will regret that for the rest of my life" on 28 February 2006.

== Aftermath ==
Shazia Khalid has since become a spokesperson about the social and legal challenges women face in Pakistan today and advocate of women's human rights.

Another rape case was reported in September 2008, where a widow resident named, Firdaus Bibi, was gang-raped in the Pakistan Petroleum Limited Colony at Sui and a case was registered against nine officials of the PPL and Defence Security Guards (DSG) in this connection according to the police sources from Dera Bugti.

== See also ==
- Mai Jindo
- Mukhtaran Bibi
- Kainat Soomro
- Rape in Pakistan
