= Kainat Soomro =

Pakistani woman (born 1993)

Kainat (born May 2, 1993, in Mehar, Pakistan) is a Pakistani woman whose struggle to obtain justice for her gang rape at the age of 13 drew international attention. Kainat was steadfast in her determination to obtain justice against her alleged attackers.

== History ==
In 2007, she claimed that she stopped into a local store to buy a toy for her niece while walking home from school. It was here that she alleged that she was drugged, kidnapped, and subsequently gang-raped by four men, among them a father and son. she claims to have escaped three days after being taken captive.

After receiving his daughter back into his home, Her father was allegedly rebuffed by the police, and a local tribunal determined her to be kari, a "black female", having lost her virginity outside of marriage. She was potentially subject to karo kari, synonymous to honor killing; however, this notion was rejected by her father, brother, and mother. Fearing the subsequent backlash of this ruling after being subject to several attacks, however, Her family fled to Karachi.

Defiant of traditional norms, She took the accused to court where the judge ultimately ruled that they were innocent, stating that "There is no corroborative evidence available on record. The sole testimony of the alleged rape survivor is not sufficient." Kainat worked with the group WAR (War Against Rape), to try to bring her attackers to justice.

During her captivity, Kainat was supposedly married to Ahsan Thebo, one of the alleged rapists, a ceremonial tactic that is thought to be sometimes used in Pakistan to avoid the harsh penalty for rape: death. The cleric who performed the marriage claimed that she looked eighteen and that she did not appear to have been forced into the marriage. The judge upheld the marriage according to Islamic law, which still takes precedence over Pakistani law, even though she was thirteen at the time and below the age of consent according to Pakistani law. She did remember signing some unknown documents and that her thumbprints were taken at gunpoint. Pakistani law did not recognize marital rape as legitimate at the time of the trial.

None of the alleged rapists brought up the marriage when Kainat was accused of having sex outside of marriage. The judgment of the village elders was that she should be punished. Only when the men were accused and stood trial did they raise that defense. The accused believe she should be silent about her ordeal. Ahsan continued to insist that he will take her from her family.

Kainat's brother was killed a month after the court ruling, allegedly for having defended his sister during the ordeal. The family have been subject to attack, the brother and father having been beaten by iron rods; she, herself, also received death threats. The family is currently engaged in appeals against the court's ruling.

== Films ==
She was the subject of a documentary film entitled Outlawed in Pakistan, depicting her story as a rape victim. The film casts her struggle as a documentary of her and her family's struggle for justice, showcasing the subsequent losses they encounter in defying cultural conventions.

== Support from the world ==
A Non-profit organisation the International Sindhi Women Organization’s on the day of International Women’s Day raised funds in Artesia, California to support her. She was invited by Malala in November 2014 to attend to the Nobel Peace Prize award ceremony and praised her struggle against injustice and her stand for her rights.

== See also ==
- Shazia Khalid
- Rape in Pakistan
