= Meerwala =

The name Meerwala refers to both a mouza and a village in Jatoi, a rural tehsil in the Muzaffargarh District of Punjab, Pakistan. The village (29.453°N 70.780°E) is 9 kilometres (5.6 mi) north of the mouza (29.374°N 70.793°E).

Meerwala achieved global infamy in 2002 as the village whose tribal elders ordered the gang rape of Mukhtar Mai.
