= Snatch theft in Karachi =

Snatch theft in Karachi is a major problem that has plagued the city for years. This criminal activity, which includes forced theft from pedestrians, has seen a significant increase in various forms of robbery and hit-and-run tactics, including mobile phone theft, car and bike theft, and other street crimes. . Despite law enforcement efforts, the city is witnessing an increase in these incidents, adding to the growing sense of insecurity among its residents.

== Background ==
Snatch theft is a major problem in Karachi which has been increasing over the years. This criminal act includes forcefully stealing from pedestrians and evading tactics. The city has seen an increase in various forms of extortion, including mobile phone theft, car and motorcycle theft, and other street crimes. Despite efforts by law enforcement, the city continues to witness an increase in these incidents, adding to the growing sense of insecurity among its residents. . According to the Citizen Police Lines Committee (CPLC) report, 7096 incidents of street crime were reported in Karachi during one month.

=== Mobile snatching ===
Mobile phone theft has become a major problem in Karachi. The city has seen an increase in mobile phone theft, making its citizens feel insecure and insecure. Stolen mobiles are often sold in second-hand or used mobile markets. An effective way to curb this scourge is to control the dealers selling stolen mobiles and prevent the use of such stolen phones through IMEI numbers by phone companies. More than 90 cases of mobile theft are reported in Karachi every day.

=== Car and bike theft ===
There has also been an increase in the theft and snatching of cars and motorcycles in Karachi. Especially in the neighborhoods of Incholi and Alnoor society, there has been an increase in car theft activities. A total of 114 four-wheelers were snapped up and 655 were stolen during the first six months of 2019. Motorcycle theft is also common, with nearly 19,000 motorcycles stolen or stolen during the first four months of 2023.

=== Street crime scenario ===
Street crimes are continuously increasing in Karachi. According to the Citizens Police Lines Committee (CPLC), a total of 7,096 incidents of street crime were reported in Karachi during June 2023. These crimes not only cause financial loss to the victims but also contribute to the growing sense of insecurity in the community. In the first five months of 2023, 44 civilians were killed by robbers, and 38 suspected robbers were killed in 'encounters'.

== Law enforcement actions ==
Karachi Police is taking action against these crimes. For example, during an operation in Baldia Etihad Town area of Karachi, a girl involved in the theft and snatching of a motorcycle was arrested. However, the recovery rate of stolen vehicles and mobile phones in Karachi is very low.

== See also ==
- Crime in Pakistan
