= Land, Gold and Women =

- Produced by: Michelle Gagnon
- Narrated by: Terence McKenna
- Release date: 5 March 2006
- Country: United Kingdom

Land, Gold and Women is a documentary about the conditions of typical women in rural Pakistan. It chronicles the traditional use of ritual gang rape as a method of social control. Central to the film are the stories of Mukhtar Mai, and Dr. Shazia Khalid. The documentary was first broadcast on 5 March 2006.

== Mai and Khalid ==
Mukhtar was an illiterate woman from a poor farming family. A more highly placed family perceived a slight by her younger brother, who was believed to have been interested in a daughter of a more high-class family. A tribal council ordered Mukhtar to report to the other family, to apologize for her brother. When she arrived, she was taken captive, and gang-raped for several days.

Shazia Khalid was working as a medical doctor in an isolated region of Pakistan. When she was raped, she found that she could not get officials to initiate an inquiry.

== Reception ==
The documentary was awarded a gold medal at the New York Film Festival in 2007.
