= Gambling in Pakistan =

Gambling is subject to heavy restrictions under Pakistani law, with certain exceptions.

== Legislation ==
Gambling is illegal for citizens under the Prevention of Gambling Act 1977, which is based on the British-era Public Gambling Act of 1867. In 1978, the provincial versions of this act were brought into effect. This legislation replaced the earlier laws such as the Baluchistan Prevention of Gambling Ordinance of 1961, West Pakistan Prevention of Gambling Ordinance of 1961, Punjab Prevention of Gambling Ordinance of 1961 and the Sindh Prevention of Gambling Ordinance of 1961.

Under this act, individuals found conducting gambling-related activities may face penalties of varying nature according to the circumstances. Those who knowingly operate gambling facilities may face fines of up to 1,000 rupees or a maximum imprisonment of up to one year, or both. Individuals who are discovered engaging in the act of gambling at "common gaming houses" are liable for fines of up to 5,000 rupees, a maximum imprisonment of one year, or both. The definition of a common gaming house includes any facility where there is evidence of gaming through the use of playing cards, dice, counters, money or instruments. For people who gamble in public places, the penalty may comprise a fine of up to 500 rupees, a maximum one year of imprisonment, or both. Likewise, individuals who are found gambling in private facilities risk a fine of up to 1,000 rupees, a term of imprisonment extending up to two years, or both. Repeat offenders may face fines extending up to 2,000 rupees or an imprisonment of up to three years, or both. The legislation grants law enforcement agencies the authority to enter and search any premises which is reported or suspected of having acting as a gaming facility.

This law provides an exception for "tourist complexes", which would be regulated by the relevant provincial governments, and to which only foreigners are admitted.

In Pakistan, all types of gambling, known as "maisir", are officially prohibited as per The Prevention of Gambling Act1 and the Penal Code of Pakistan. Despite this, in the late 1990s and early 2000s betting was prevalent nationwide. There were around 60 betting shops in Karachi alone (and hundreds countrywide).
