= Shagufta Anwar =

Pakistani politician

Shagufta Anwar is a Member of Provincial Assembly (MPA) of the Provincial Assembly of the Punjab in Pakistan. She is the Parliamentary Secretary for Anti-Corruption. She is a member of the ex-ruling Pakistan Muslim League-Q party.

== Education ==
Anwar is the daughter of Mian Muhammad Anwar and was born at Sargodha. She received the degree of M.A. in Political Science in 1991 and that of LL.B. in 1992 and also completed D.T.L. in 1993 from University of the Punjab, Lahore. A practising lawyer, she is a member of the International Bar Association and has sat on the executive committee, Tax Reforms Committee, and Environmental Protection Committee of the Lahore High Court since 1995.

== Career ==
She was elected an MPA of the Punjab in the General Elections of 2002 against one of the seats reserved for women; and has served as Parliamentary Secretary for Anti Corruption since August 5, 2003. She is also a member of the Syndicate at Lahore College for Women University. She visited the United States in 2004 at the invitation of the Government of the United States.

== Sources ==
- Official Biography
