= Rape in Pakistan =

Overview of rape and other sexual violence in Pakistan

Punishment for rape in Pakistan under the Pakistani laws is either death penalty or imprisonment of between ten and twenty-five years. For cases related to gang rape, the punishment is either death penalty or life imprisonment. DNA test and other scientific evidence are used in prosecuting rape cases in Pakistan.

Rape in Pakistan came to international attention after the politically sanctioned rape of Mukhtaran Bibi. The group War Against Rape (WAR) has documented the severity of rape in Pakistan, and the police indifference to it. According to Women's Studies professor Shahla Haeri, rape in Pakistan is "often institutionalized and has the tacit and at times the explicit approval of the state". According to late lawyer Asma Jahangir, who was a co-founder of the women's rights group Women's Action Forum, up to 72% of women in custody in Pakistan are physically or sexually abused.

Approximately 4,326 cases of rape were reported in the year 2018 followed by 4,377 rape cases in 2019, 3,887 cases in 2020 and 1,866 cases in 2021. The Human Rights Ministry of Pakistan stated that the reports of rape, violence and workplace harassment have gradually and consecutively lowered in the years 2018, 2019, 2020 and 2021 respectively. Critics say that the conviction rate in the country is low as rape cases in Pakistan take years to prosecute. Rampant corruption in the lower judiciary and political influence can also help the rapist escape punishment.

In 2019, the government of Pakistan established more than 1,000 special courts across the country. These special courts would focus only on addressing the issues related to violence against women in Pakistan. The establishment of special courts were hailed by many human rights organizations.

== History ==
=== 1947 and 1979 ===
Prior to 1979, Section 375 of the Pakistan Penal Code stated that girls younger than the age of fourteen were prohibited from sex acts even if consent was acquired. Despite this, the previous laws also claims that rape during marriage is not considered rape as long as if the wife is over the age of fourteen.

In 1979, the Pakistani legislature made rape and adultery offences for the first time in the country's history, with the passage of The Offence of Zina (Enforcement Of Hudood) Ordinance, 1979. The Ordinance changed the punishment for such offences from imprisonment and fines, to punishments such as stoning to death. Although this new law is stated to protect women, it reinforces that in order to do so there must be concrete evidence. The evidence was most commonly deemed to be a witness who could testify that the rape actually occurred. In 1979, the witness had to be deemed as credible and honest by the Qazi.

According to the Ordinance, rape is defined as:

1. the sex is occurring against the will of the person
2. the individual did not consent to partaking in sexual intercourse
3. the perpetrator obtains consent by the victim by threatening, hurting or causing fear to the victim.
4. the perpetrator and victim are not married

=== 2006 Women Protection Bill ===
On 15 November 2006, National Assembly of Pakistan passed Women Protection Bill to amend the heavily criticised 1979 Hudood Ordinance laws. Under the new bill, death penalty for extramarital sex and the need for victims to produce four witnesses to prove rape cases were removed. Death penalty and flogging for people convicted of having consensual sex outside marriage was removed. However, Consensual sex outside marriage was still treated as a criminal offense with a punishment of five years in prison or a fine of US$165.

Under the Women Protection Bill rape is described as a man who has sexual intercourse with a woman:

1. against her will.
2. without her consent
3. with her consent, when the consent has been obtained by putting her in fear of death or of hurt
4. with her consent, when the man knows that he is not married to her and that the consent is given because she believes that the man is another person to whom she is or believes herself to be married; or
5. with or without her consent when she is under sixteen years of age.

The punishment for rape under 2006 Women Protection Bill is either death or imprisonment of between ten and twenty-five years. For cases related to gang rape, the punishment is either death penalty or life imprisonment.

=== Criminal Law (Amendment) (Offense of Rape) Act 2016 ===
On 7 October 2016, Pakistan's parliament unanimously passed a new anti-rape and anti-honour killing bills. The new laws introduced harsher punishments for the perpetrators of such crimes. According to the new anti-rape bill, DNA testing was made mandatory in rape cases. Sabotaging or disrupting the work of a police officer or Government official could result in imprisonment of 1 year under the new law. Government officials who are found taking advantage of their official position to commit act of rape (e.g. custodial rape) are liable to imprisonment for life and a fine. According to the new law, anyone who rapes a minor or a mentally or physically disabled person will be liable for the death penalty or life imprisonment.

Recording of statement of the female survivor of rape or sexual harassment shall be done by an Investigating Officer, in the presence of a female police officer, or a female family member of the survivor. Survivors of rape shall be provided legal aid (if needed) by the Provincial Bar Council. The new law also declares that trials for offences such as rape and related crimes shall be conducted in-camera and also allows for the use of technology such as video links to record statements of the victim and witnesses, to spare them the humiliation or risk entailed by court appearances. The media will also be restricted from publishing or publicising the names or any information that would reveal the identity of a victim, except when publishing court judgements. The trial for rape shall conclude within three months. However, if the trial is not completed within three months then the case shall be brought to the notice of the Chief Justice of the High Court for appropriate directions. The new bill also ensures that sex workers are also included in the law's protection.

UN Women Executive Director, Phumzile Mlambo-Ngcuka, hailed the Government of Pakistan's decision to pass the anti-rape and anti-honour killing bills.

=== Virginity tests ===
In 2021, Lahore High Court banned the use of virginity tests in cases where women claim they were raped.

== Notable cases ==
Since 2000, various women and young girls have begun to speak out after being sexually assaulted. Going against the tradition that a woman should suffer in silence, they have lobbied news outlets and politicians. A recent report from the Human Rights Commission of Pakistan estimated that in 2009, 46 percent of unlawful female killings in Pakistan were "honour killings".

- In 2002, 30-year-old Mukhtaran Bibi (Mukhtār Mā'ī) was gang raped on the orders of the village council as an "honour rape" after allegations that her 12-year-old brother had had sexual relations with a woman from a higher caste. Although custom would expect her to commit suicide after being raped, Mukhtaran spoke up, and pursued the case, which was picked up by both domestic and international media. On 1 September 2002, an anti-terrorism court sentenced 6 men (including the 4 rapists) to death for rape. In 2005, the Lahore High Court cited "insufficient evidence" and acquitted 5 of the 6 convicted, and commuted the punishment for the sixth man to a life sentence. Mukhtaran and the government appealed this decision, and the Supreme Court suspended the acquittal and held appeal hearings. In 2011, the Supreme Court too acquitted the accused. Mukhtār Mā'ī's story was the subject of a Showtime (TV network) documentary called Shame, directed by Mohammed Naqvi, which won awards including a TV Academy Honor (Special Emmy) of the Academy of Television Arts and Sciences.
- A 23-year-old woman in Faisalabad made public accusations against the police, saying her husband had been arrested for creating forged documents; she alleges she was raped on the orders of the chief of police for her actions. The officer was suspended but not arrested.
- Kainat Soomro was a 13-year-old schoolgirl when she was kidnapped and gang raped for four days. Her protest has led to the murder of her brother, a death sentence from the elders of her village, and threats from the rapists, who after four years still remain at large.
- In 2012, three members of the Border Police were remanded into custody for raping five women aged between fifteen and twenty-one. The women claim they were taken from a picnic area to the police station in Dera Ghazi Khan, where the police filmed themselves sexually assaulting the women.
- In January 2014, a village council ordered gang-rape that was carried out in the same Muzaffargarh district where the Mukhtaran Bibi took place in 2002.
- In the 2014 Layyah rape murder incident, on 19 June 2014, a 21-year-old woman was gang raped and murdered in Layyah district, Punjab province of Pakistan.
- In September 2014, three sons of Mian Farooq, a ruling party parliamentarian from Faisalabad, were accused of abducting and gang raping of a teenage girl. The rapists were later released by the court.
- In July 2017, a panchayat ordered rape of a 16-year-old girl in Multan as punishment for her brother's conduct.
- In December 2017, a 25-year-old woman was gang-raped by four dacoits during a robbery at her house in Multan.
- In January 2018, a seven-year-old girl named Zainab Ansari was raped and strangled to death in Kasur. The incident caused nationwide outrage in Pakistan. The same month, a 16-year-old girl was raped and killed in Sargodha, and a day later, in the same city, a 13-year-old boy was intoxicated and sexually assaulted by two men belonging to an influential family. In Faisalabad, the same day, a 15-year-old boy was found dead. The later medical reports confirmed a sexual assault. A few days later, the dead body of a 3-year-old girl, named Asma, was found in Mardan, who had been reportedly missing for 24 hours. Her postmortem report points that she had been raped before her murder. These unfortunate events caused to shape more proactive role and participation in Pakistan's women's rights movements like 'Me Too movement' and Aurat March. UNODC Goodwill Ambassador Shehzad Roy collaborated with Bilawal Bhutto to introduce awareness about education against child sexual abuse in Sindh.
- In September 2020, a resident of Gujranwala was gang raped by two robbers roughly during midnight when her car stalled mid-way due to a fuel shortage, shortly after she had crossed Lahore's toll plaza (outside the limits of Lahore City) on her journey back to Gujranwala, on a secluded segment of M-11 Lahore-Sialkot Motorway. She was accompanied by two of her three children (a toddler and a 4 year old) and perturbed for her own and their safety, she immediately conveyed the trouble to her relatives at Gujranwala and the Motorway Police who, allegedly, informed her that the portion where she was stuck at, was not as of yet "under their jurisdiction" after which she also called the local police and waited for some help. However, one of the rapists, Abid Ali, an inveterate criminal, a murderer, rapist, convict and absconder taking unlawful refuge in an adjacent village (after having seamlessly evaded arrest against his past infringements for over a decade) immediately spotted her car from the roof he was present on, much before any help could arrive. He, accompanied by his gangmate, (reportedly, after one other had turned down the idea of involvement at that moment in time for unknown reasons) hastily approached the car and broke open the windows of the locked car and forcibly took the startled and terrified woman and her children down the side embankment slope of the main carriageway, into a sequestered region besides forest area. Both of them raped the woman while the children, in a state of shock, threatened and beaten and too young to comprehend or react, were present nearby throughout the entire ordeal. They then robbed the woman of her belongings and threatened to kill her but did not inflict further injury and eventually eloped in the abyss. Intensive man-hunt operations were launched by law enforcement agencies after several nationwide demonstrations eventuated demanding the immediate arrest of perpetrators, By November 2020, both of the perpetrators had been arrested and are currently undergoing trials in terrorism courts. A lead police official commented that she should not have travelled alone such late night and should've checked her fuel levels before embarking on her journey. These comments were perceived as sexist and apologetic of rape, leading to an outcry over Victim blaming. Just a few days earlier, a 5-year-old girl was raped in Karachi, hit on the head and set on fire.
- 8 February 2021: a boy was found dead after being sexually assaulted in Chowk Steel Bagh area after remaining missing for five days. According to the police report, the 15-year-old son of Mustafa went missing after going to a poultry farm in Raukhanwala area for work. The relatives of the boy chanted slogans and protested against the police and demanded that the charge of sexual abuse be included in the case against the suspects and that justice be served.

== Types ==
The group War Against Rape (WAR) has documented the severity of the rape problem in Pakistan and of police indifference to it. WAR is an NGO whose mission is to publicize the problem of rape in Pakistan; in a report released in 1992, of 60 reported cases of rape, 20% involved police officers. In 2008 the group claimed that several of its members were assaulted by a religious group as they tried to help a woman who had been gang raped identify her assailants.

According to a study carried out by Human Rights Watch there is a rape once every two hours, a gang rape every hour and 70-90 percent women are suffering with some kind of domestic violence.

According to Women's Studies professor Shahla Haeri, rape in Pakistan is "often institutionalized and has the tacit and at times the explicit approval of the state". According to a study by Human Rights Watch, there is a rape once every two hours and a gang rape every eight. Asma Jahangir, a lawyer and co-founder of the women's rights group Women's Action Forum, reported in a 1988 study of female detainees in Punjab that around 72 percent of them stated they had been sexually abused while in custody.

=== Rape by family members ===
According to WAR, over 82% of rapists are family members including fathers, brothers, grandfathers and uncles of the victims. The crimes come to light when the girls get pregnant and go to gynecologists for abortion. The mothers do not go to the police either.

According to NGO Sustainable Social Development Organization, reported rapes and sexual assaults soared as much as 400% quarter on quarter during the COVID-19 lockdown, due to Covid restrictions forcing children to remain indoors thus allowing relatives to more frequently abuse them.

According to the Human Rights Commission of Pakistan (HRCP), as much as 95% of cases occur in children’s homes, often involving family members. "This is why parents and elders often decide against reporting the cases," says Asad Iqbal Butt of HRCP. "And it explains the gap between the reported and actual cases of child sexual abuse."

=== Marital rape ===
In Pakistan, approximately 20-30% of women face some form of domestic abuse during their lifetime. Marital rape is a form of spousal abuse as it is considered to be a crime under Pakistani laws but it remains to be a problem in the country. Many men and women in Pakistan are raised with the beliefs that "sex is a man's right in marriage". Women are instilled with the concept that their purpose in society is to fulfill a man's desires as well as to bear children. The topic of sex is a taboo subject in Pakistan; therefore, women often refrain from reporting their experiences with rape. Marital abuse in general is considered to be a family and private matter in Pakistan which is another reason why women refrain from reporting in fear of social judgment. Non consensual marital sex can lead to issues with reproductive health, unsafe sex, as well as unwanted pregnancies. Studies show that marital rape continues throughout pregnancies, as well as can lead to the birth of numerous babies. Studies show that marital rape commonly occurs in Pakistan because of the husband's desire to have more children and in particular, to have sons. Even in cases of non-consensual pregnancy resulting from rape, the reward in increased status could be great enough that women choose to keep the baby, but women who have already borne sons often seek abortions and in some cases sterilization to avoid the unintended pregnancies that result from rapes. Women have had the procedure done without their husbands permission. Men sometimes get a vasectomy but it is far more common for women to become sterilized. Sometimes after the operation the husband's demands for sex increase.

Marital rape is treated the same as any other rape in Pakistani law punishable with death by hanging or up to 25 years in prison. However, only one case of marital rape has been reported in Pakistan despite it being a common problem.

Firstly, the role of cultural pressures and expectations from a woman in marriage, with the wife's own mother encouraging the husband to try and consummate the marriage against the wife's will. Secondly, justice is only available to educated and resourceful Pakistani women with considerable social status, with access to female police, and access to a female judge willing to hold an in-camera trial after hours. Finally, a combination of corporal punishment and fine is an appropriate sentence rather than a long jail sentence, as a wife may be financially dependent on the husband, and the husband may learn his lesson, in particular, if the act was committed under societal pressure to consummate the marriage.

=== Child sexual abuse ===
Child sexual abuse is widespread in Pakistani schools. In a study of child sexual abuse in Rawalpindi and Islamabad, out of a sample of 300 children 17% claimed to have been abused and in 1997 one child a day was reported as raped, gang raped or kidnapped for sexual gratification. In September 2014, the British Channel 4 broadcast a documentary called Pakistan's Hidden Shame, directed by Mohammed Naqvi and produced by Jamie Doran, which highlighted the problem of sexual abuse of street children in particular, an estimated 90 percent of whom have been sexually abused.

The practice of Bacha bazi, a custom involving sexual abuse of adolescent males or boys by older men is reported to be common in the areas of North western Pakistan. While Pakistan has laws for the protection of children and banning of homosexuality, these are rarely enforced and bacha bazi is justified as a cultural tradition.

The NGO Sahil reported 3,832 cases of child abuse in 2018 which is an 11 per cent increase from 2017 (3,445 cases). Most of these cases are reported in Punjab province and the fewest cases were reported in Gilgit Baltistan province. About 72 percent of the cases are reported in rural areas and 28 percent in urban areas.

==== Kasur scandal ====
The Kasur child sexual abuse scandal is a series of child sexual abuses that occurred in Hussain Khanwala village in Kasur District, Punjab, Pakistan from 2006 to 2014, culminating in a major political scandal in 2015. After the discovery of hundreds of video clips showing children performing forced sex acts, various Pakistani media organizations estimated that 280 to 300 children, most of them male, were victims of sexual abuse. The scandal involved an organized crime ring that sold child pornography to porn sites, and blackmailed and extorted relatives of the victims.

=== Revenge rape ===
In 2002, when a 12-year-old boy was accused of affair with a woman, the jirga (council of local elders) ordered his elder sister Mukhtar Mai (28 year) to be gangraped as a revenge. In 2017 a boy raped a 12-year-old girl and the jirga ordered his sister to be raped as revenge. But the police arrested them.

=== Rape of minorities ===
The rape and assault of Christian, Hindu women are reported in Pakistan. Inaction, refusal to file complaints, intimidation and corruption amongst the police and judiciary are also frequent problems.

== Attitudes ==
Rape in Pakistan came to international attention after Mukhtaran Bibi charged her attackers with rape and spoke out about her experiences. She was then denied the right to leave the country. The matter of her refused visit to the US was raised in an interview by the Washington Post with the then President of Pakistan, General Pervez Musharraf, who claimed to champion "Moderate Islam" that "respect the rights of women", and complained that his country is "unfairly portrayed as a place where rape and other violence against women are rampant and frequently condoned". He said that he had relented over allowing her to leave the country, and remarked that being raped had "become a money-making concern", a way to get rich abroad. This statement provoked an uproar, and Musharraf later denied having made it.

The statement was made in the light of the fact that another rape victim, Dr Shazia Khalid, had left Pakistan, was living in Canada, and had spoken out against official attitudes to rape in Pakistan. Musharraf said of her: "It is the easiest way of doing it. Every second person now wants to come up and get all the [pause] because there is so much of finances. Dr. Shazia, I don't know. But maybe she's a case of money (too), that she wants to make money. She is again talking all against Pakistan, against whatever we've done. But I know what the realities are."

DNA test and other scientific evidence are used in prosecuting rape cases in Pakistan.

== See also ==
- Acid throwing
- Child marriage
- Dowry death
- Domestic violence
- Domestic violence in Pakistan
- Feudalism in Pakistan
- Honor killing
- Honour killing in Pakistan
- Hudood Ordinances
- Human trafficking in Pakistan
- Rape investigation
- Violence against women in Pakistan
- Women in Pakistan
- Women related laws in Pakistan

== Bibliography ==
- Hussain, Rafat; Khan, Adeel (28 April 2008). "Women's Perceptions and Experiences of Sexual Violence in Marital Relationships and Its Effect on Reproductive Health". Health Care for Women International. 29 (5): 468–483. doi:10.1080/07399330801949541. ISSN 0739-9332. PMID 18437595. S2CID 28441918.
- Noor, Ali; Aslam, Saad (25 March 2026). "Media Reporting, the Rise of Victim Blaming and Honour Killings in Pakistan". Social Science Review Archives. 4 (1): 6390–6398. doi:10.70670/sra.v4i1.2504. ISSN 3006-4708.
