= Whitney Dow =

Filmmaker, producer and director

- Dow in 2014
- Education: Columbia University (1986)
- Occupation: Documentary filmmaker

Whitney Dow is a documentary filmmaker, producer, and director. He is best known for Two Towns of Jasper , co-directed with Marco Williams, which received a George Foster Peabody Award and an Alfred I. duPont-Columbia University Award. His other directing credits include I Sit Where I Want: The Legacy of Brown v. Board of Education, Unfinished Country, When the Drum Is Beating, and The Big Payback, co-directed with Erika Alexander.

In 2014, Dow launched Whiteness Project with POV. Whiteness Project is an online "interactive investigation" into the experiences of white Americans. The interactive project received coverage from NPR, New York magazine and CBS. The first installment, "Inside the White/Caucasian Box," is a collection of 21 interviews filmed in Buffalo, New York, that includes data enforcing or refuting the interviewees' statements.

Dow had directed more than 200 shorts and commercials by 1998 when he co-founded Two Tone Productions, a company that creates films addressing issues of race. In addition to directing films such as Two Towns of Jasper, I Sit Where I Want, Unfinished Country and When the Drum is Beating, he has also produced Freedom Summer, Banished and Toots. Dow's work has also been exhibited at the Metropolitan Museum of Art, the Museum of Modern Art and the Smithsonian Institution.

In 2020, Dow was invited to join the Documentary Branch of the Academy of Motion Picture Arts and Sciences.

In 2022, Dow co-directed and produced The Big Payback with Erika Alexander. The documentary follows Robin Rue Simmons and the effort to establish a reparations program for Black residents of Evanston, Illinois. It premiered at the Tribeca Festival and was broadcast nationally on PBS's Independent Lens in January 2023.
