= War Against Rape =

Pakistani non-governmental organization

War Against Rape (WAR) is a non-governmental organization (NGO) based in Karachi and founded in 1989.

Through 1979–1988 martial law was enacted in Pakistan; this led to the creation of many NGOs, including WAR. The group's mission is to publicize the problem of rape in Pakistan; in a report released in 1992 covering 60 reported case of rape, 20% involved police officers. In 2008 the group claimed that several of its members were assaulted by a religious group as they tried to help a woman who had been gang raped identify her assailants.
