= Chagrin Documentary Film Festival =

US annual documentary film festival

- Status: active
- Genre: film festivals
- Frequency: Annually
- Location: Chagrin Falls, Ohio
- Country: United States
- Years active: 15–16
- Inaugurated: 2010
- Website: www.chagrinfilmfest.org

Chagrin Documentary Film Festival is an annual documentary film festival based in Chagrin Falls, Ohio. The festival debuted in 2010, with 93 films showing in venues throughout the village. That year, the festival had an attendance of 1,800. By the 2015 festival, that number had grown to almost 7,000, while the number of films shrank to less than 70.

The festival currently has an all-volunteer staff.

== History ==
The festival's director is Mary Ann Quinn Ponce, who founded the festival in 2010 in honor of her son, filmmaker David Ponce. The festival is operated by Fevered Dreams Productions.

Fevered Dreams Productions was founded by Chagrin Falls High School Alumnus and filmmaker David Ponce as his film production company. David was inspired to tell the story of Sparrow Village, an aids orphanage in Johannesburg, South Africa in a documentary entitled The Lost Sparrows of Roodepoort. However David contracted leukemia, and died in 2006 before his film could be completed. With the help of his friend Brock Carter and Chapman University/Dodge College of Film Assistant Dean Michael Kowalski, The Lost Sparrows of Roodepoort was completed. Fevered Dreams Productions has become a nonprofit organization dedicated to allowing talented filmmakers to tell their unique stories.
