= Timeline of Operation Radd-ul-Fasaad =

Pakistani army operation

The timeline of Operation Radd-ul-Fasaad (Urdu: آپریشن رد الفساد; lit. 'Rejection of Strife') summarizes key events and developments of Pakistan's nationwide counterterrorism operation conducted by the Pakistani military in coordination with law enforcement agenciess. Covering the period from 23 February 2017 to 22 July 2024, it highlights major operations, raids, arrests, and security milestones aimed at dismantling militant networks and consolidating gains from earlier campaigns, particularly Operation Zarb-e-Azb.

== Launch ==
- 22 February 2017 — The Pakistan Army publicly announced the launch of Operation Radd-ul-Fasaad (literally, “Elimination of Discord”) nationwide. The Inter-Services Public Relations (ISPR) statement described its goals as eliminating residual and latent terrorist threats, consolidating gains from previous operations, and securing Pakistan's borders.
- The operation was designed to incorporate multiple security agencies (army, air force, navy, civil armed forces, police, and intelligence bodies) working in coordination.
- Alongside counterinsurgency, a “de-weaponisation” campaign and explosive control measures were declared as cardinal components.

=== 2017: Early Operations & Sub-Operations ===
- By April 2017 — Military sources reported seizures of weapon caches and hundreds of arrests in Punjab province under Radd-ul-Fasaad, as security forces intensified operations in Pakistan's heartland.
- Operation Khyber IV (as a component of Radd-ul-Fasaad) — This sub-operation was conducted in Rajgal Valley (FATA region) to prevent ISIS-Khorasan infiltration from Afghanistan, and to further secure the Federally Administered Tribal Areas.
- Lahore bombing, 23 February 2017 — A bombing in Lahore's Defence area killed 10 people. Occurring one day after the operation's launch, this attack was initially considered as part of the terror threat landscape that Radd-ul-Fasaad sought to address.

=== Intermediate Years (2018–2021): Consolidation & Statistics ===
- End of 2018 — Pakistani official data indicated that in 2018, 368 civilians, 163 soldiers, and 166 terrorists had been killed in 163 incidents. Authorities claimed that 207 terrorists were arrested in 65 operations, and 301 terrorists surrendered in 4 separate incidents under the operation's remit.
- By 2020 / 2021 — ISPR and media reports claimed that more than 149,000 intelligence-based operations had been undertaken, “thousands” of threat warnings issued, and hundreds of planned attacks prevented.
- As of 2021 — Pakistani sources reported that over 375,000 intelligence-based operations had been conducted under Radd-ul-Fasaad across the country.

=== Later Developments & Evaluation ===
- March 2022 — Analysts and military commentators described Radd-ul-Fasaad as having “changed Pakistan’s trajectory” by reducing terrorism incidents and restoring relative peace, though acknowledging ongoing challenges.
- Strategic critiques and evaluations — Academic studies (e.g. Dar, 2019) and security analysts have assessed the operation's capability to disrupt militant support networks, dismantle arms supply lines, and enforce law and order beyond conventional combat zones.
- Continuing threat environment — While Radd-ul-Fasaad has been credited with gains in counterterrorism, other analyses note that the resurgence of instability in neighbouring Afghanistan (especially post–2021) has posed renewed challenges for Pakistan's internal security, with a “new wave” of terrorism observed.

== 2017 ==
=== February ===
- 1 February – Three security personnel and six civilians were injured on Tuesday when a roadside blast targeted a Frontier Corps convoy in Charsadda.
- 6 February – At least two policemen were injured in a militant attack at Thana Mandan police station in Bannu
- 7 February – Four people including two security men were injured in an explosion on Tuesday near a Levies check post in Chaman, a border town adjacent to Afghanistan.
- 10 February – Five students were injured in a roadside bomb blast in Arang area of Bajaur Agency.
- 10 February – At least one child was killed and four others injured when an Improvised Explosive Device (IED) went off at Arang area.
- 12 February – Samaa TV Journalist Taimoor Khan killed in an incident. Tehreek-e-Taliban Pakistan claimed the responsibility.
- 12 February – Five security personnel were injured in a roadside bomb blast in Bajaur Agency's Mamund Tehsil
- 12 February – 3 FC Personnel killed in South Waziristan IED Explosion.
- 13 February – A blast outside the provincial assembly in Lahore killed at least 14 people and injured more than 87 others.
- 13 February – Two killed in Quetta IED blast.
- 15 February – At least two people killed and seven others injured in a suicide blast in Peshawar's Hyatabad area.
- 15 February – 5 People including 3 Levies personnel killed and Eight others were injured in a suicide attack in Mohmand Agency.
- 15 February – Intelligence agency man shot dead in Nowshera firing.
- 16 February – Three soldiers martyred, two injured in an IED explosion in Awaran.
- 16 February – Attack on police vehicle kills Five three were also injured.

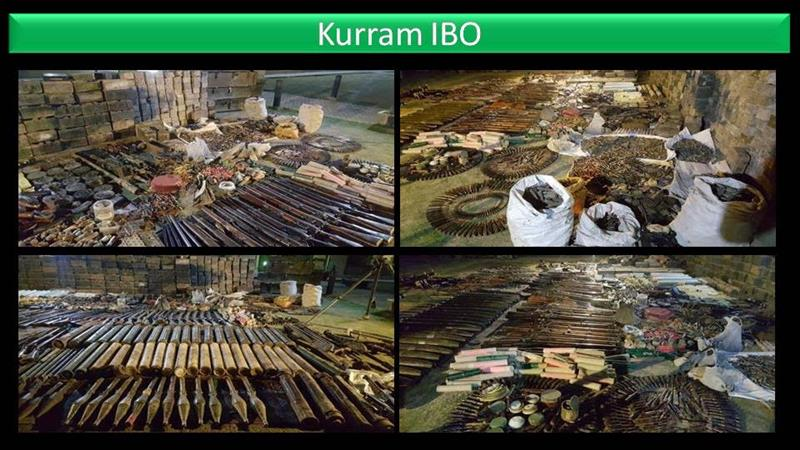

- 17 February Three Frontier Corps personnel were injured after militants from Afghanistan attacked a Pakistani border check post in Khyber Agency. The ISPR reported that some militants were killed during the exchange.
- 19 February A cracker blast reported in Hyderabad's Naya pul leaving 15 passerby wounded.
- 20 February Five hurt in Nadra firing incident in Quetta.
- 21 February Three suicide bombers targeted a sessions court in Tangi, Charsadda District, Khyber Pakhtunkhwa, killing 6 people and injuring more than 20 others.
- 21 February At least two people died while another was injured in a landmine blast in Dera Bughti.
- 23 February 2017 At least 45 suspects were arrested in Rawalpindi and Islamabad. Joint operations were conducted in Westridge, Dhoke Hassu and Bakery Chowk area of Cantt. The Frontier Corps (FC) and intelligence agencies foiled a major terror plot near Loralai, Balochistan. The security forces recovered 23 Improvised Explosive Devices (IEDs) during the joint targeted operation.
- 26 February 2017 The apex committee of Punjab decided to expedite ongoing operation against terrorists across the province. The ISPR said that at least four terrorists were killed and more than 600 suspects detained in over 200 raids conducted by the Rangers across Punjab. The raids were conducted in various parts of Punjab, including Karor, Layyah and Rawalpindi.

=== March ===
- 6 March Five soldiers of Pakistan army and 10 militants were killed in a cross border attack at three border checkpoints in Mohmand Agency.
- 17 March At least three Pakistani soldiers and eight Taliban militants were killed when insurgents launched cross-border attacks on military training facilities in Khyber-Pakhtunkhwa province.

=== April ===
- 14 April 4 Rangers personnel martyred and 3 were injured and Rangers kill 10 TTP militants in operation near DG khan.
- 20 April Eight suspected TTP militants were killed by CTD in an intelligence based operation (IBO) in Sheikhupura.
- 20 April Five terrorists were killed and 11 apprehended during search and intelligence-based operations (IBO) carried out in different parts of the country during the last 24 hours.
- 25 April – 14, including six children, killed and 9, including 4 Khasadar officials, injured in a roadside blast in Kurram Agency.

=== June ===
- 23 June – 14 people ─ including seven policeman ─ lost their lives, while 19 others were injured in a suicide blast that shook Shuhada Chowk in Quetta's Gulistan Road area on Friday morning.

=== July ===
- 10 July – 3 people were killed and over 20 injured when a suicide bomber blew himself up at Bogra Chowk in Chaman, Baluchistan.

=== October ===
- 18 October - At least eight people, including seven policemen, were killed and 24 others injured in an explosion targeting a truck carrying police officials in the Sariab Mill area of Quetta.

=== November ===
- 9 November - A senior police officer was among three suspected militants involved in ISI Clandestine activities who died in a suicide attack on Quetta the provincial capital of Balochistan.

=== December ===
- 3 December 11 BRA militants held in Balochistan raids.
- 8 December Surrender of 300 militants in Quetta along with 17 commanders.

=== Summary of 2017 ===
At the end of 2017, 463 civilians, 215 soldiers and 591 terrorists were killed in 295 incidents. 906 terrorists were arrested in 179 incidents and 924 terrorists surrendered in 12 incidents

== 2018 ==
Soure:

=== January ===
- 15 January – Security personnel were killed when their vehicle was ambushed in Balochistan.
- 16 January – Gunmen killed a police constable in Quetta.
- 16 January – A suicide bomber on a motorcycle in Karachi, aided by gunmen, targeted a senior officer known for leading raids on militant hideouts. The officer survived, and his guards killed two of the gunmen.
- 18 January – Gunmen killed a mother and daughter working on polio vaccination in Quetta.
- 30 January – A bomb explosion in the Upper Kurram Agency killed multiple members of the same family.

=== February ===
- 2 February – A suicide bomber injured two guards.
- 3 February – Eleven soldiers of the Pakistan Army were killed from a suicide attack near a military camp in Khyber-Pakhtunkhwa.
- 5 February – Multiple casualties from a bomb that targeted a pro-government leader in Panjgur.
- 5 February – Gunmen attacked two Chinese nationals in Karachi.
- 5 February – Multiple casualties when a vehicle was attacked in North Waziristan.
- 7 February – Multiple casualties from a remote-controlled explosion in Bajaur Agency.
- 14 February – Tehrik-i-Taliban gunmen killed paramilitary soldiers in Quetta.
- 16 February – A leading tribal elder and chief of a local peace committee was killed by a bomb in Bajaur Agency.
- 21 February – A police checkpoint in Peshawar was attacked by people with hand grenades.
- 23 February – The car of a senior government official on Peshawar's Ring Road was targeted with a bomb.
- 28 February – Paramilitary soldiers were killed in a suicide bombing outside Quetta. Elsewhere in Quetta, gunmen killed two guards in a senior police officer's convoy.

=== March ===
- 8 March – Two people were shot in Quetta.
- 14 March – Multiple casualties in a suicide bombing at a police checkpoint outside Lahore.
- 17 March – Terrorists killed polio workers and a paramilitary Frontier Corps soldier in Mohmand Agency.
- 24 March – A hand grenade thrown at a spring festival in Dera Ismail Khan injured dozens of people.
- 30 March – An IED killed policemen in the district police officer's convoy in Dera Ismail Khan.
- 31 March – Gunfire during an operation in Balochistan resulted in the death of one soldier and one terrorist.

=== April ===
- 1 April – Gunmen attacked a vehicle in Quetta, killing a member of the Shia Hazara community.
- 9 April – A suicide bomber injured multiple people near a Balochistan Frontier Corps vehicle in Quetta.
- 15 April – Christians were shot and killed outside a church in Quetta.
- 18 April – A shopkeeper in the Shia Hazara community was shot and killed in Quetta.
- 22 April – Gunmen on a motorcycle killed Shiites outside Quetta.
- 24 April – Three suicide bombings killed multiple policemen in Quetta.
- 26 April – Multiple people were killed by a hand grenade attack at a wedding in North Waziristan.
- 28 April – Two shopkeepers in the Hazara community were shot and killed in Quetta.

=== May ===
- 2 May – A roadside bomb exploded in Safi Tehsil.
- 3 May – A bomb injured three security personnel in Jani Khel.
- 3 May – A vehicle carrying civilian employees of an atomic agency PAEC was attacked in Attock. There were multiple casualties.
- 4 May – Six labourers of Punjabi descent were shot dead in Balochistan.
- 6 May – Ahsan Iqbal, Interior Minister, was shot in the shoulder while getting out of his car to attend a political meeting in Punjab province.
- 11 May – A bomb targeted a police patrol at a bus stop in Bannu.
- 14 May – A Shiite religious scholar was shot by Lashkar-e-Jhangvi terrorists in Khyber Pakhtunkhwa.
- 27 May – Two Policemen and two militants were killed when unidentified militants opened fire on Policemen at Sarki Road in Quetta, Balochistan.

=== July ===
- 13 July – 5 citizens were killed and 10 were injured after a planted bomb exploded near the car of JUI-F candidate Akram Khan Durrani in Bannu.
- 24 July – At least three security personnel and a civilian were killed while 13 others sustained injuries after a military convoy on election duty came under attack in Turbat.

=== August ===
- 4 August – A government girls' school was torched in the Darel tehsil of the Diamer District in Gilgit-Baltistan in Pakistan. In another incident, one policeman was killed and another wounded in a gun battle in the Tangir tehsil of the same district. A militant was also killed in the incident.
- 11 August – A suicide bomber of Balochistan Liberation Army targeted a bus with Chinese engineers in Dalbandin left 6 injured.
- 23 August -One security personnel was killed and an additional 3 were injured in a bomb blast in North Waziristan

=== September ===
- 14 September – At least three levies personnel died in a motorcycle bomb blast and another two were injured on the northern by-pass in the Pishin District of Balochistan. Hizbul Ahrar claimed responsibility.
- 25 September – An IED blast in North Waziristan left a soldier dead and another injured. The Jihadi group Hizbul Ahrar claimed responsibility and claimed killing 1 and injuring 4.
- 30 September – A IED went off in the Upper Dir District of the Khyber Pakhtunkhwa province of Pakistan resulting in the death of Pakistani soldier as well as the injury of another one, no group has claimed responsibility yet for this attack.

=== October ===
- 2 October – Terrorists opened fire and bombed a convoy killing 3 Pakistani Security personnel and injuring 8 more at the Awaran District of Balochistan, Pakistan. No group has claimed responsibility although Terrorist groups have done similar attacks in that area in the past.
- 8 October – A shooting attack left a policeman dead in Karachi, Pakistan the Hizbul-Ahrar militant group claimed responsibility and claimed injuring 3 policemen more.
- 11 October – A roadside bomb targeted a vehicle belonging to the Pakistani Army in the Ladha Subdivision of South Waziristan Pakistan, resulted in the deaths of three soldiers and five wounded, the Tehrik-i-Taliban Pakistan claimed responsibility for the attack.

=== Summary of 2018 ===
At the end of 2018, 368 civilians, 163 soldiers and 166 terrorists were killed in 163 incidents. 207 terrorists were arrested in 65 incidents and 301 terrorists surrendered in 4 incidents.

== 2019 ==
=== January ===
- 1 January – Four Frontier Corp were killed in Loralai, Balochistan.
- 4 January – One terrorist was killed in KPK.
- 5 January - 6 civilians were injured in bomb blast in Peshawar.
- 6 January - 10 people were injured in blast in Balochistan.
- 6 January - 2 soldiers were killed in Balochistan.
- 16 January - 4 terrorists were killed in KPK.
- 23 January - One person was killed in suicide blast.
- 29 January - 2019 Loralai attack
- Total of 16 terrorists were arrested and 15 were killed.

=== February ===
- 6 February - 28 Missing people made to their homes.
- 12 February - One cop was killed in Sindh.
- 12 February - Four cops were killed in KPK.
- 13 February - One civilian was killed in KPK.
- 13 February - 3 Civilians were killed.
- 15 February - 2 civilians were killed in karachi.
- 16 February - 2 Soldiers were killed in Balochistan.
- 17 February - 4 soldiers were killed in Balochistan
- 19 February - 2 soldiers were injured in blast in Balochistan.
- 24 February - 1 civilian was killed in blast in Balochistan.
- Total of 224 terrorists were arrested and 3 were killed.

=== March ===
- 3 March - One cop was killed in Sindh.
- 4 March - 5 civilians were injured in blast in Balochistan.
- 7 March - 44 terrorists surrendered in Balochistan.
- 8 March - 4 soldiers were killed in Balochistan.
- 14 March - One person was killed in KPK.
- 14 March - 2 civilians were killed in Balochistan.
- 17 March - 5 Civilians were killed in Balochistan.
- 18 March - 3 people were injured in blast in KPK.
- 21 March - 6 soldiers were killed in Balochistan.
- 24 March - 2 civilians were injured in KPK.
- 24 March - 3 civilians were killed in Balochistan.
- 29 March - One person was killed in KPK.
- Total of 168 terrorists were arrested, 4 were killed and 44 surrendered.

=== April ===
- 4 April - 50 terrorists surrendered in Balochistan.
- 8 April - 28,000 personals belonging to both Levies and Khasadar forces merged into Police forces
- 9 April - One civilian was killed in KPK.
- 9 April – Three terrorists were arrested in Punjab.
- 9 April - One big terrorist was arrested in Peshwar, KPK.
- 12 April - 2019 Quetta attack: 22 people and one suicide bomber were killed in Hazarganji, Quetta.
- 12 April - two civilians were killed Chaman.
- 14 April - 7 suspects arrested in case of plotting a bomb on railway track, which was defused, in thatta, Sindh.
- 14 April - One civilian was killed, accused arrested in Peshawar Khyber.
- 14 April - One child was killed by picking up grenade in thinking of toy in Karak District, Khyber.
- 14 April - 17 terrorists arrested in search operation in different parts of Karachi, Sindh.
- 16 April - 11 including one policeman arrested for facilitating the terrorists in different parts of Karachi.
- 16 April - 5 terrorists and one policeman were killed in an operation in Peshawar, KPK.
- 18 April - 2019 Makran Massacre: 14 people including two soldiers were killed on Makran Coastal Highway.
- 19 April - Sindh rangers arrested 16 suspected terrorists in Karachi.
- 19 April - The Counter Terrorism Department (CTD) arrested two terrorists in KPK.
- 24 April - A Special Police force officer escorting polio team shot dead KPK.
- 25 April - A female polio worker shot dead in Balochistan.
- 26 April - Rangers arrested four terrorists in Bahawalpur.
- 27 April - Three soldiers were killed and two injured in a blast in KPK.
- 29 April - Two soldiers killed and one injured in separate attacks in KPK.

=== May ===
- 1 May - One journalist was killed in KPK.
- 1 May - One Jundallah terrorist was arrested in Karachi.
- 1 May - Three soldiers were killed and seven other injured in separate attacks on Pak-Afghan Border.
- 2 May - Police arrested two terrorists in KPK.
- 4 May - A polio worker was shot dead in KPK.
- 5 May - One police officer was killed in Faisalabad.
- 6 May - One soldier was killed and three other injured in an attack on Pak-Afghan Border.
- 8 May - One terrorist was arrested in Peshawar.
- 8 May - Three people were killed in a blast in KPK.
- 8 May – 2019 Lahore bombing: 13 people including 8 police officers were killed in a blast in Lahore.
- 9 May - Five people including three soldiers were killed in Balochistan.
- 9 May - Five suspects were arrested in Lahore.
- 9 May - Two terrorists were killed in KPK.
- 11 May - Five people including one soldier and three terrorists were killed in Gwadar clash in Balochistan.
- 13 May - Four policemen were killed in Balochistan.
- 15 May - Three labourers were killed in an attack in Balochistan.
- 16 May - Nine terrorists were killed in Balochistan.
- 17 May - One terrorist was killed in Sindh.
- 17 May - Three terrorists were killed in Balochistan.
- 19 May - One terrorist was arrested in Karachi.
- 19 May - One terrorist was killed in KPK.
- 20 May - One terrorist was arrested in Lahore.
- 20 May - Two terrorists were arrested in Karachi.
- 23 May - Two terrorists were killed in KPK.
- 23 May - Two terrorists sentenced two death in case of killing Lawyer in 2011.
- 24 May - Four worshipers were killed and 28 wounded in bomb blast in Mosque in Quetta.
- 24 May - One worshiper was killed in Karachi.

=== December ===
On 29 December 2019, Qari Saifullah Mehsud was shot dead by two unknown gunmen in Khost Province of Afghanistan. According to the locals, the two gunmen had been "guests" at the TTP commander's home for several days before they killed him and fled. Qari Saifullah Mehsud was a key Tehrik-i-Taliban Pakistan (TTP) commander and was among the terrorists most wanted to Pakistan for his involvement in several terror attacks in the country. He was notorious for preparing suicide jackets and suicide bombers for terrorist acts and was also the mastermind behind 2015 Karachi bus shooting. According to the Analysts, the killing of Mehsud is a big hit for the TTP as he was trying to unite all the split militant groups. His death was also confirmed by TTP. Mehsud was also previously arrested by U.S. forces in Afghanistan in 2016 but was later released after spending 14 weeks in jail in Afghanistan. Mehsud funeral ceremony and burial took place in Gurbaz district of Khost Province.

== 2020 ==
=== January ===
On 30 January, two senior members of TTP were shot dead by unknown gunmen in Kabul, Afghanistan. The deceased were identified to be Sheikh Khalid Haqqani and Qari Saif Younis and their bodies were found in the vicinity of Intercontinental Hotel in Kabul. Sheikh Khalid Haqqani held key position in the TTP leadership council, and formerly served as the group's deputy leader. He was accused of being involved in several high-profile attacks on Pakistani politicians and an attack on school in Peshawar in 2014. Qari Saif Younis was a military commander in TTP and directed suicide operations. According to one militant source, the men were planning to hold a secret "meeting" in Kabul, on the direct orders of the group's leadership, apparently travelling from the eastern Afghan province of Paktika. The militants did not reveal who they were planning on meeting. Both the TTP members were killed on 30 January, however, their death was confirmed on 7 February by the TTP leadership. The TTP leadership had initially ordered the news to be kept "secret", partly as they were rattled by the assassinations, and partly to avoid awkward questions about why the men were in the city.

The statement from TTP said that the two men were killed in clashes with the United States troops. However, the sources within the group also acknowledged that it was also possible that gunmen or militants linked to Pakistani intelligence services were responsible for the assassination. The bodies of the men killed in Kabul were handed over to the group, and a large funeral was held for them on Monday in their stronghold in eastern Kunar province.

=== February ===
- 17 February - February 2020 Quetta bombing

=== June ===
- 29 June 29 - Pakistan Stock Exchange attack

=== July ===
- 29 July - A soldier was killed in a terrorist attack at Bajaur security post.

=== August ===
- 5 August – At least 39 people were injured in an RGD-1 grenade attack on a Jamaat-i-Islami rally in the Gulshan-e-Iqbal neighborhood of Karachi. The Sindhudesh Revolutionary Army claimed responsibility for the attack.
- 10 August – A bomb killed at least 5 people and several others were injured in Chaman, Balochistan.

=== October ===
On 15 October 2020, At least 14 security personnel were killed in the first incident after a convoy of state-run Oil & Gas Development Company (OGDCL) was attacked on the coastal highway in Balochistan's Ormara, Radio Pakistan reported.

- 16 October -
  - An attack kills least 7 soldiers and 7 security guards in Balochistan.
  - A bomb kills at least 6 members of the Army in North Waziristan.
- 21 October - At least 5 people were killed and 27 others were injured in an explosion at an apartment building in Karachi.
- 27 October - 2020 Peshawar school bombing - Eight students were killed in a bombing at a school in Peshawar, Khyber Pakhtunkhwa.

== 2021 ==
=== January ===
- 3 January - Machh attack

=== February ===
- 22 February - Ippi shooting

=== March ===
- 24 March - 2021 Chaman bombings

=== April ===
- 21 April - Quetta Serena Hotel bombing

=== May ===
- 21 May - 2021 Chaman bombings
- 31 May - May 2021 Balochistan attacks

=== June ===
- 23 June - 2021 Lahore bombing

=== July ===
- 14 July- a Bus carrying Chinese workers in the Dasu area of Upper Kohistan District fell into a ravine after an explosion, killing 13 people, including nine Chinese residents and 4 Pakistanis, and injured 28 others.

=== August ===
- 9 August - August 2021 Quetta bombing
- 14 August - Karachi grenade attack
- 20 August - Gwadar suicide attack
- 26 August - August 2021 Balochistan attacks

=== September ===
- 5 September - 2021 Quetta suicide attack
- 11 September - Two soldiers of Frontier Corps South were killed and another was injured when armed men attacked their convoy in the Buleda area of Kech district.
- 15 September - Seven soldiers of the Pakistan Army were killed during an intelligence-based operation in the Asman Manza area of South Waziristan.
- 24 September - Two security personnel were killed and five others injured in an attack in Awaran district.
- 25 September - Four security personnel were killed and two others injured in a bomb attack on a vehicle of the Frontier Corps in the Khosat area of Harnai district.

== 2022 ==
=== January ===
- 20 January - 2022 Lahore bombing
- 25 January - 2022 Kech District attack

=== February ===
- 2 February - 2022 Panjgur and Naushki raids

=== March ===
- 2 March - 2022 Quetta bombing
- 3 March - 2022 Sibi suicide bombing
- 4 March - 2022 Peshawar mosque attack
- 15 March - 2022 Sibi IED explosion

=== April ===
- 26 April - 2022 University of Karachi bombing

=== May ===
- 12 May - 2022 Karachi Saddar bombing
- 15 May - Miranshah gunfiring 2022
- 16 May - 2022 Karachi Bolton Market bombing

=== September ===
- 13 September - 2022 Swat blast

=== November ===
- 16 November - 2022 Lakki Marwat attack
- 30 November - 2022 Quetta suicide attack

=== December ===
- 14 December - December 2022 Miranshah suicide bombing
- 18 December - 2022 Bannu CTD centre attack
- 23 December - 2022 Islamabad suicide attack
- 25 December - Five Pakistan Army personnel were killed in an improvised explosive device (IED) blast during a clearance operation in Kahan, Balochistan.

== 2023 ==
=== January ===
- 3 January–
  - Two intelligence officers, including the director of the provincial counterterrorism department, are shot dead outside a restaurant in Khanewal, Punjab, Pakistan, by suspected Pakistani Taliban gunmen.
  - The government orders the closure of all shopping malls and retail markets by 8:30 p.m. (PKT) daily as part of an energy conservation plan to offset increasing energy prices.
- 13 January – Sarband police station attack in Peshawar, Khyber Pakhtunkhwa.
- 15 January – A gunman fled after shooting three officers at the post in Zardad Dahri, in Charsadda District, Khyber Pakhtunkhwa. Two of three soldiers died on way to hospital.
- 18 January – Four soldiers were killed in a cross-border attack from the Iranian border in Panjgur District, Balochistan.
- 19 January – Three police officers were killed in a suicide bombing at a police outpost in Khyber Pakhtunkhwa.
- 20 January – A bomb blast derailed a passenger train in Peshi, Kachhi District, Balochistan, injuring eight people.
- 30 January – 2023 Peshawar mosque bombing
- 31 January – A police station in Mianwali, Punjab, came under a gun attack by a group of militants. Police said that the attack was repulsed.

=== February ===
- 10 February – Two soldiers martyred in IED attack in Balochistan.
- 17 February 2023 Karachi police station attack.
- 26 February 2023 Barkhan blast.

=== March ===
- 6 March – Bolan suicide bombing: A suicide bombing in Bolan, Balochistan, killed 8 policemen, 1 civilian and left several others injured.
- 20 March – Havelian rocket attack
- 21 March – ISI brigadier and three soldier martyred in South Waziristan shootout.
- 29 March – 2023 Lakki Marwat terrorist attack
- 31 March - 2023 A CTD official & a cleric killed during a raid.

=== April ===
- 1 April - 2023 Kech District attack. 4 Pakistani soldiers were killed.
- 3 April - 2 police officials killed in Kohat, Khyber Pakhtunkhwa.
- 4 April - 4 FC personnel killed in 2 separate attacks by members of Pakistani Taliban forces in South Waziristan.
- 7 April - 1 assistant police inspector killed and 2 others injured by Swabi grenade attack.
- 8 April - 2023 Khyber blast. 2 soldiers killed by IED blast.
- 9 April - 1 Pakistani soldier killed in firefight with terrorists, 2 terrorists killed.
- 10 April - 2023 Kandahari Bazar Bombing. 4 people, including 2 police officers, were killed, and 15 others injured by a motorcycle bomb targeting police in Quetta as part of the ongoing Balochistan insurgency.
- 11 April - 4 police officers killed in Quetta operation by insurgents.

=== May ===
- 9 May - In response to the arrest of former prime minister Imran Khan on corruption charges, supporters of the Pakistan Tehreek-e-Insaf party began mass riots. The riots primarily targeted government and military property. Over four thousand people were arrested in connection to the riots, and at least ten fatalities were confirmed.
- 13 May - 2023 Muslim Bagh attack. a Frontier Corps camp in Muslim Bagh, Balochistan was attacked by a group of six militants. The militants killed six members of the corps and a civilian before the military counterattacked and killed all six militants.
- 23 May - 2023 North Waziristan suicide blast.

=== June ===
- 5 June - Two soldiers and two Pakistani Taliban members are killed in a shootout in the North Waziristan district of Khyber Pakhtunkhwa.
- 24 June - One person is killed and five others are injured after a suicide bombing in Turbat, Balochis.
- 24 June - One person was killed by unidentified motorcyclists in Peshawar.

=== July ===
- 2 July - Four Frontier Constabulary (FC) personnel were killed and one was injured in an attack on checkpost in the Dhana Sar area of Balochistan's Sherani subdistrict. One terrorist was also killed and two others were injured in the attack
- 3 July - Two Pakistan Army officers were killed and one was injured in an attack in Balor, Balochistan.
- 6 July - At least four soldiers were killed in two separate attacks in Khyber district and North Waziristan district.
- 10 July - Deputy Superintendent of Police (DSP) was injured in a terrorist attack on a police checkpost in Katlang, Maran.
- 12 July - At least four soldiers were killed and another five soldiers were injured in an attack on Pakistan Army military base in Zhob Balochistan. At least three terrorists were also killed by the Pakistan Army in retaliation.
- 18 July - Six personnel of the Peshawar Frontier Corps were injured in a blast in Hayatabad Peshawar.
- 20 July - 2 policemen were killed and 2 were injured in an attack on checkpost in Regi Model Town Peshawar.
- 20 July – 2023 Bara explosion. Three police officers and one civilian killed by a suicide bombing in a compound office in Bara, Khyber Pakhtunkhwa.
- 21 July - At least four people were injured in a blast in the Geelay area of Bajaur district.
- 24 July - Three people were killed by unknown motorcyclists in Barang, Bajaur.
- 25 July - One police officer was killed by suicide bombing at Ali Masjid in Khyber district.
- 30 July – 2023 Khar bombing. At least 54 people are killed in a suicide bombing at an event held by supporters of Maulana Fazlur Rehman, leader of the Jamiat Ulema-e-Islam (F) party.
- 31 July – One police officer was killed in gunfire in Mardan district.

=== August ===
- 1 August - Two police officers were killed in a gun attack on a polio vaccination team in Kili Nawa, Quetta.
- 7 August - A suicide bomber in North Waziristan apparently detonated his explosives-laden vehicle prematurely, killing a married couple in a nearby car.
- 7 August - A roadside bomb in the town of Kech in southwestern Pakistan struck a vehicle carrying Ishaq Yaqub, a politician from the Baluchistan Awami Party, as well as six of his colleagues. All were killed.
- 9 August - A suicide bomber attacked a security vehicle on a main road in Bajaur near Larkhalozo Hospital, injuring at least one Frontier Constabulary official.
- 19 August - A suspected IED blast killed 11 labourers in North Waziristan
- 22 August - 8 Pakistani soldier killed and 6 injured in an ambush by TTP in Tiarza, South Waziristan.
- 31 August - 10 Pakistani Army soldiers were killed and 18 injured in a suicide attack in Janikhel of Bannu district, Khyber Pakhtunkhwa.

=== September ===
- 1 September - Two Pakistan Army soldiers, including a Major, killed in gunfight with TTP fighters in Miranshah, North Waziristan.
- 7 September - 2023 Chitral cross-border attacks
- 11 September - One FC personnel was killed in a blast in Peshawar.
- 29 September
  - 2023 Mastung bombing
  - 2023 Hangu blast
  - A military vehicle was targeted by terrorists, resulting in the loss of four military personnel. In response operation conducted near Sambaza in the Zhob district, security forces killed three terrorists.

=== October ===
- 8 October - 9 October - An SSG major and a havaldar were killed in An IBO in Sambaza, Zhob.
- 9 October – One policeman was killed and two were injured in a terrorist attack on the Hathala police station in Dera Ismail Khan.
- 10 October – Terrorists attacked the Hathala police station in Dera Ismail Khan with hand grenades.
- 21 October – The security forces conducted an intelligence operation (2023 Lakki Marwat operation) in the Semu Wanda area on the outlined Occupancy of militants in which four militants were shot dead at the moment, whereas one got injured and was seized by the security forces
- 28 October – One policeman was killed in an attack carried out by terrorists in Dera Ismail Khan.

=== November ===
- 3 November – 2023 Dera Ismail Khan bomb blast
- 3 November – 2023 Gwadar ambush
- 4 November – M.M. Alam PAF Training Base attack
- 6 November - November 2023 Terrorist Encounter in Khyber Pakhtunkhwa
- 7 November - 2023 Khyber Pakhtunkhwa oil and gas company attack
- 15 November - November 2023 Balochistan Security Checkpoint Attack

=== December ===
- 12 December - Daraban police station attack
- 15 December - 2023 Tank district attack
- 15 December - 2 Pakistani troops were killed by militants in an attack on a security checkpoint in the Khyber District. 6 others were also injured.

== 2024 ==
=== January ===
- 10 January - Three police officers and one civilian was killed in a terrorist attack in Kohat.
- 29 January - One person was injured in a gun attack on ANP leader in Shangla Khyber Pakhtunkhwa.
- 29 January - One police officer was killed and one truck driver injured in a rocket attack on Mach Jail in Balochistan.
- 30 January - Four people were killed and six were injured in a bomb blast in Balochistan.
- 31 January - Five people were injured in a grenade attack on the election office of PPP in Quetta.
- 31 January - Rehan Zeb Khan, election candidate, was killed in gun attack in Bajaur, Khyber Pakhtunkhwa. Three other people were also injured in the attack.

=== February ===
- 1 February - Zahoor Ahmad of ANP was killed in gun attack in Killa Abdullah Balochistan. One person was injured in the attack.
- 2 February - A bomb blast targeted the office of Election Commission of Pakistan in Karachi.
- 5 February - 10 police officer were killed and six were injured in a terrorist attack on Chodwan police station in Dera Ismail Khan.
- 7 February - Two bomb blasts in Pakistan's southwestern province of Balochistan have killed at least 22 people with more injured.

=== March ===
- 16 March - 7 soldiers including a lieutenant colonel and a captain were killed in a militant raid in Mir Ali.
- 18 March - Pakistan Air Force launches retaliatory strikes for the Mir Ali ambush beginning the Afghanistan-Pakistan clashes.

=== May ===
- 14 May -A major was killed in an Intelligence based operation in Sambaza.
- 26 May -A captain and a soldier were killed in an Intelligence based operation in Hassan Khel area, Peshawar.

=== June ===
- 9 June -An improvised explosive device (IED) killed 7 Pakistani soldiers including a captain. The device exploded near a security convoy in Lakki Marwat, a district in the Khyber Pakhtunkhwa province bordering Afghanistan. No group claimed responsibility.
- 22 June - On 22nd June 2024, Pakistan's Apex Committee on National Action Plan approved a new operation codenamed as Azb-e-Istehkam (Resolve for Stability) that is meant to address slow implementation of National Action Plan specially by addressing its vow of healing extremism across Pakistan.
- 24 June - Operation Azm-e-Istehkam officially commences.

== See also ==
- Operation Radd-ul-Fasaad
