= Terrorist incidents in Pakistan in 2023 =

This article is an incomplete outline of terrorist incidents in Pakistan in 2023 in chronological order.

== January ==
- 3 January – Two intelligence officers, including the director of the provincial counterterrorism department, were shot dead outside a restaurant in Khanewal, Punjab, by suspected Pakistani Taliban gunmen.
- 13 January – Islamist insurgents attacked Sarband Police Station in Peshawar, Khyber Pakhtunkhwa, Pakistan, which was repelled by police personnel. Three policemen were killed in the gun and grenade attack. The Pakistani Taliban claimed responsibility.
- 15 January – A gunman fled after shooting three policemen at the post in Zardad Dahri, in Charsadda District, Khyber Pakhtunkhwa. Two of the three policemen died on the way to hospital.
- 18 January – Four soldiers were killed in a cross-border attack from the Iranian border in Panjgur District, Balochistan.
- 19 January – Three police officers were killed in a suicide bombing at a police outpost in Khyber Pakhtunkhwa.
- 20 January – A bomb blast derailed a passenger train in Peshi, Kachhi District, Balochistan, injuring eight people.
- 30 January – 2023 Peshawar mosque bombing
- 31 January – A police station in Mianwali, Punjab, came under a gun attack by a group of militants. Police said that the attack was repulsed.

== February ==
- 4 February - A woman and her son were injured in a landmine explosion in Salarzai, Bajaur.
- 10 February – Two soldiers were killed in an IED attack in Balochistan.
- 12 February - One soldier and 14 others were injured in an attack in North Waziristan.
- 13 February - Eight people were injured in blast in North Waziristan.
- 17 February – 2023 Karachi police station attack.
- 26 February – 2023 Barkhan blast.
- 27 February - One child was killed and two children were injured in a bomb blast in South Waziristan.

== March ==
- 6 March – Bolan suicide bombing: A suicide bombing in Bolan, Balochistan, killed 8 policemen, 1 civilian and left several others injured.
- 15 March - Two people were killed and seven were injured in remote control bomb blast in Khuzdar.
- 20 March – Havelian rocket attack
- 21 March – ISI brigadier Mustafa Kamal Barki and three soldier martyred in South Waziristan shootout.
- 29 March – 2023 Lakki Marwat terrorist attack
- 31 March – A CTD official & a cleric killed during a raid in Mardan.

== April ==
- 1 April – Four Pakistani soldiers were killed in a terrorist attack along the Pak-Iran border in Kech district, Balochistan. The Inter-Services Public Relations (ISPR) confirmed that the attackers had operated from the Iranian side of the border. The deceased soldiers were identified as Naik Shair Ahmed, Lance Naik Muhammad Asghar, Sepoy Muhammad Irfan, and Sepoy Abdur Rasheed.
- 3 April – 2 police officials killed in Kohat, Khyber Pakhtunkhwa.
- 4 April – 4 FC personnel killed in 2 separate attacks by members of Pakistani Taliban forces in South Waziristan.
- 7 April – 1 assistant police inspector killed and 2 others injured by Swabi grenade attack. The two constables that were injured. Ijaz suffered minor injuries while Constable Nasib was sent to the Mardan Medical Complex for treatment.
- 8 April – 2023 Khyber blast. 2 soldiers killed by IED blast.
- 9 April – 1 Pakistani soldier killed in firefight with terrorists, 2 terrorists killed.
- 10 April - 1 person was killed and 1 was injured by unidentified men in Bajaur.
- 10 April – 2023 Kandahari Bazar Bombing. 4 people, including 2 police officers, were killed, and 15 others injured by a motorcycle bomb targeting police in Quetta as part of the ongoing Balochistan insurgency.
- 11 April – 4 police officers killed in Quetta operation by insurgents.
- 14 April - Three children were killed in blast in Chaman Balochistan.
- 24 April - 2023 Kabal explosions.
- 27 April - A Counter-Terrorism Department officer was killed in a blast in Khuzdar Balochistan.
- 28 April - 3 Pakistan Army soldiers were killed in 3 different attacks in Lakki Marwat. 7 terrorists were also killed in retaliation.

== May ==
- 4 May - 4 teachers and 3 workers were killed in a Government high school Tari mangal Parachinar [by local Tari village]. No one arrested in 1 year. Ex-Government never took seriously.
- 9 May – In response to the arrest of former prime minister Imran Khan on corruption charges, supporters of the Pakistan Tehreek-e-Insaf party began mass riots. The riots primarily targeted government and military property. Over four thousand people were arrested in connection to the riots, and at least ten fatalities were confirmed.
- 13 May – 2023 Muslim Bagh attack. A Frontier Corps camp in Muslim Bagh, Balochistan was attacked by a group of six militants. The militants killed six members of the corps and a civilian before the military counterattacked and killed all six militants.
- 16 May – Five security personnel and four civilians were injured in a suicide blast in North Waziristan.
- 18 May – 1 person was killed and 3 were injured in a blast in Peshawar.
- 19 May – 2023 Zhob suicide attack
- 23 May – 2023 North Waziristan suicide bombing
- 31 May – Five FC personnel and one child were injured in a bomb blast in North Waziristan.

== June ==
- 3 June – Two people were killed in a remote-controlled bomb blast in Momand, Bajaur district.
- 5 June – Two soldiers and two Pakistani Taliban members are killed in a shootout in the North Waziristan district of Khyber Pakhtunkhwa.
- 20 June – 2 soldiers were killed in a bomb blast in North Waziristan.
- 24 June – One person was killed and five others were injured after a suicide bombing in Turbat, Balochistan.
- 24 June – One person was killed by unidentified motorcyclists in Peshawar.

== July ==
- 2 July – Four Frontier Constabulary (FC) personnel were killed and one was injured in an attack on checkpost in the Dhana Sar area of Balochistan's Sherani subdistrict. One terrorist was also killed and two others were injured in the attack
- 3 July – Two Pakistan Army officers were killed and one was injured in an attack in Balor, Balochistan.
- 5 July – Three soldiers of Pakistan Army were killed and three civilians were injured in a suicide blast in Miran Shah, North Waziristan.
- 6 July – At least four soldiers were killed in two separate attacks in Khyber district and North Waziristan district.
- 10 July - Deputy Superintendent of Police (DSP) was injured in a terrorist attack on a police checkpost in Katlang, Maran.
- 12 July – At least four soldiers were killed and another five soldiers were injured in an attack on Pakistan Army military base in Zhob Balochistan. At least three terrorists were also killed by the Pakistan Army in retaliation.
- 18 July – Six personnel of the Peshawar Frontier Corps were injured in a blast in Hayatabad Peshawar.
- 20 July – 2 policemen were killed and 2 were injured in an attack on checkpost in Regi Model Town Peshawar.
- 20 July – 2023 Bara explosion. Three police officers and one civilian killed by a suicide bombing in a compound office in Bara, Khyber Pakhtunkhwa.
- 21 July - At least four people were injured in a blast in the Geelay area of Bajaur district.
- 24 July - Three people were killed by unknown motorcyclists in Barang, Bajaur.
- 25 July – One police officer was killed by suicide bombing at Ali Masjid in Khyber district.
- 30 July – 2023 Khar bombing. At least 54 people are killed in a suicide bombing at an event held by supporters of Maulana Fazlur Rehman, leader of the Jamiat Ulema-e-Islam (F) party.
- 31 July – One police officer was killed in gunfire in Mardan district.

== August ==
- 1 August - Two police officers were killed in a gun attack on a polio vaccination team in Kili Nawa, Quetta.
- 7 August - A suicide bomber in North Waziristan apparently detonated his explosives-laden vehicle prematurely, killing a married couple in a nearby car.
- 7 August - A roadside bomb in the town of Kech in southwestern Pakistan struck a vehicle carrying Ishaq Yaqub, a politician from the Baluchistan Awami Party, as well as six of his colleagues. All were killed.
- 9 August - A suicide bomber attacked a security vehicle on a main road in Bajaur near Larkhalozo Hospital, injuring at least one Frontier Constabulary official.
- 19 August - A suspected IED blast killed 11 labourers in North Waziristan
- 22 August - 8 Pakistani soldier killed and 6 injured in an ambush by TTP in Tiarza, South Waziristan.
- 31 August - 10 Pakistani Army soldiers were killed and 18 injured in a suicide attack in Janikhel of Bannu district, Khyber Pakhtunkhwa.

== September ==
- 1 September - Two Pakistan Army soldiers, including a Major, killed in gunfight with TTP fighters in Miranshah, North Waziristan.
- 7 September - 2023 Chitral cross-border attacks
- 11 September - One FC personnel was killed in a blast in Peshawar.
- 29 September
  - 2023 Mastung bombing
  - 2023 Hangu blast
  - A military vehicle was targeted by terrorists, resulting in the loss of four military personnel. In response operation conducted near Sambaza in the Zhob district, security forces- killed three terrorists.

== October ==
- 9 October – One policeman was killed and two were injured in a terrorist attack on the Hathala police station in Dera Ismail Khan.
- 10 October – Terrorists attacked the Hathala police station in Dera Ismail Khan with hand grenades.
- 21 October – The security forces conducted an Intelligence operation (2023 Lakki Marwat operation) in the Semu Wanda area on the outlined Occupancy of militants in which four militants were shot dead at the moment, whereas one got injured and was seized by the security forces
- 28 October – One policeman was killed in an attack carried out by terrorists in Dera Ismail Khan.

== November ==
- 3 November – 2023 Dera Ismail Khan bomb blast
- 3 November – 2023 Gwadar ambush
- 4 November – M.M. Alam PAF Training Base attack
- 6 November - November 2023 Terrorist Encounter in Khyber Pakhtunkhwa
- 7 November - 2023 Khyber Pakhtunkhwa oil and gas company attack
- 15 November - November 2023 Balochistan Security Checkpoint Attack

== December ==
- 12 December - Daraban police station attack
- 15 December - 2023 Tank district attack
- 15 December - 2 Pakistani troops were killed by militants in an attack on a security checkpoint in the Khyber District. 6 others were also injured.

== See also ==
- 2023 in Pakistan
- Terrorist incidents in Pakistan in 2022
- Terrorist incidents in Pakistan in 2024
