= List of terrorist incidents in 2023 =

This is a list of terrorist incidents in 2023, including attacks by violent non-state actors for political motives. Note that terrorism related to drug wars and cartel violence is not included. Ongoing military conflicts are listed separately.

== Guidelines ==
- To be included, entries must be notable (have a stand-alone article) and described by a consensus of reliable sources as "terrorism".
- List entries must comply with the guidelines outlined in the manual of style under MOS:TERRORIST.
- Casualties figures in this list are the total casualties of the incident including immediate casualties and later casualties (such as people who succumbed to their wounds long after the attacks occurred).
- Casualties listed are the victims. Perpetrator casualties are listed separately (e.g. x (+y) indicate that x victims and y perpetrators were killed/injured).
- Casualty totals may be underestimated or unavailable due to a lack of information. A figure with a plus (+) sign indicates that at least that many people have died (e.g. 10+ indicates that at least 10 people have died) – the actual toll could be considerably higher. A figure with a plus (+) sign may also indicate that over that number of people are victims.
- If casualty figures are 20 or more, they will be shown in **bold**. In addition, figures for casualties more than 50 will also be **underlined**.
- Incidents are limited to one per location per day. If multiple attacks occur in the same place on the same day, they will be merged into a single incident.
- In addition to the guidelines above, the table also includes the following categories:

0 people were killed/injured by the incident.
1–19 people were killed/injured by the incident.
20–49 people were killed/injured by the incident.
50–99 people were killed/injured by the incident.
100+ people were killed/injured by the incident.

== List ==
Total incidents: 58

Date	Type	Dead	Injured	Location	Article	Details	Perpetrator	Part of
1 January	Bombing	20	30	Kabul, Afghanistan	2023 Kabul airport bombing	A bomb was detonated outside a checkpoint near Kabul International Airport.	Islamic State – Khorasan Province	Islamic State–Taliban conflict
4 January	Car bombings	35	Unknown	Mahas District, Somalia	Mahas bombings	Two car bombs targeted politicians' houses and a market. Al-Shabaab claimed responsibility.	al-Shabaab	Somali Civil War
11 January	Suicide bombing	20+	Unknown	Kabul, Afghanistan	Ministry of Foreign Affairs of Afghanistan bombing	A suicide attacker detonated a bomb outside the offices of the Ministry of Foreign Affairs of Afghanistan.	Islamic State – Khorasan Province	Islamic State–Taliban conflict
15 January	Bombing	17	39	Kasindi, North Kivu, DRC	Kasindi church bombing	A bomb was detonated outside a Pentecostal Church.	Islamic State – Central Africa Province	Kivu conflict
25 January	Machete attack	1	4	Algeciras, Spain	2023 Algeciras church attacks	A man attacked two churches with a machete in Algeciras, southern Spain, killing a priest and injuring four others.	Islamic terrorism	Islamic terrorism in Europe
27 January	Shooting	1	2	Tehran, Iran	Attack on the Azerbaijani Embassy in Tehran	A man entered the embassy with a Kalashnikov rifle and opened fire. The head of the embassy's security service, Orkhan Asgarov, was killed in the attack, while two guards were injured.	Yasin Huseynzadeh	Assassination and terrorism in Iran
27 January	Mass shooting	7 (+1)	3	Neve Yaakov, East Jerusalem	2023 Neve Yaakov shooting	A 21-year-old Palestinian shot Israeli civilians near a synagogue inside an Israeli settlement before being killed by police.	Khairi Alqam	Israeli–Palestinian conflict
30 January	Suicide bombing	84 (+1)	220+	Peshawar, Pakistan	2023 Peshawar mosque bombing	A suicide attacker detonated a bomb during afternoon prayers inside a mosque in the Police Lines area. A significant number of casualties were police officers.	Jamaat-ul-Ahrar faction of Tehrik-i-Taliban Pakistan (suspected)	Insurgency in Khyber Pakhtunkhwa
10 February	Vehicle-ramming attack	3 (+1)	4	Ramot Junction, East Jerusalem	2023 Ramot Junction attack	Palestinian man rammed his car into a bus stop, killing two children aged 6 and 8 and a 20-year-old man.	31-year-old Palestinian citizen of Israel named Hussein Qaraqa, a resident of Isawiya. Qaraqa had made statements in support of Palestinian militant groups such as Palestinian Islamic Jihad, Lions' Den.	Israeli–Palestinian conflict
17 February	Shooting, suicide bombing	4+ (+3)	16+	Karachi, Pakistan	2023 Karachi police station attack	Militants with automatic weapons, grenades and suicide vests attacked the heavily guarded Karachi Police Office (KPO). One of the attackers blew himself up in the building. The two others were killed by security forces.	Tehrik-i-Taliban Pakistan (TTP)	Terrorism in Pakistan
17 February	Mass shooting	68	Unknown	Al-Sukhnah, Syrian Arab Republic	2023 Al-Sukhnah attack	Islamic State militants on motorcycles attacked truffle farmers and Syrian soldiers who were escorting the farmers. 61 civilians and seven soldiers were killed.	Islamic State	Syrian civil war
26 February	Shooting attack	2 (+1)	0	Huwara, West Bank	2023 Huwara shooting	An unidentified person fatally shot two Israelis in their car in Huwara, a town south of Nablus.	Sources pointed to a Hamas gunman as the assailant, but no group claimed responsibility for the shooting. On 7 March, the suspected attacker, 49-year-old Abdel Fattah Hussein Kharousha, was killed along with five other Palestinians during an Israeli raid in Jenin.	Israeli–Palestinian conflict
4 March	Mass shooting	10	12	Pamplona, Negros Oriental, Philippines	Pamplona massacre	A group of former members of the Philippine military stormed the residence of Roel Degamo, the governor of Negros Oriental, and killed him.	former members of the Philippine military	Terrorism in the Philippines
6 March	Suicide bombing	9 (+1)	13	Kachhi District, Pakistan	Bolan suicide bombing	A suicide bomber on a motorcycle targeted a van carrying Balochistan Constabulary personnel.	Islamic State	Terrorism in Pakistan
2 April	Improvised explosive device bombing	1	42	Saint Petersburg, Russia	2023 Saint Petersburg bombing	During a speech by military blogger Vladlen Tatarsky in a café, an IED planted in a statuette gifted to him exploded.	Darya Trepova (suspect)	Russian invasion of Ukraine, Terrorism in Russia
5 April	Mass stabbing, Mass murder, Infanticide	4	5	Blumenau, Brazil	2023 Blumenau school attack	A 25-year-old man attacked a daycare center with a hatchet, killing four children and injuring five others.	Luiz Henrique de Lima	Terrorism in Brazil
6–7 April	Mass shooting	44	Unknown	Séno Province, Burkina Faso	Kourakou and Tondobi attacks	The villages of Kourakou and Tondobi were attacked by jihadists. The attacks were reprisal killings that were retaliation for villagers in the towns lynching two jihadists who had been stealing cattle.	Jihadists	Jihadist insurgency in Burkina Faso
7 April	Shooting	3 (+3)	0	Hamra junction, Jordan Valley, West Bank	2023 Hamra junction shooting	An Israeli vehicle was attacked by gunfire, killing two sisters with dual Israeli-British citizenship; their mother died three days later of her wounds.	Al Qassam Brigade	Israeli–Palestinian conflict
7 April	Car ramming	1 (+1)	7	Tel Aviv, Israel	2023 Tel Aviv car-ramming	A car veered onto an occupied sidewalk and continued for 150 meters before skidding and overturning.	Yusef Abu Jaber, a 45-year-old Arab Israeli from Kafr Qassem	Israeli–Palestinian conflict
9 May	Mass shooting	5 (+1)	8	Djerba, Tunisia	2023 Djerba shooting	A member of the Tunisian National Guard opened fire on pilgrims celebrating the Jewish holiday of Lag BaOmer in the El Ghriba Synagogue, killing two worshippers and two police officers before he was shot dead by security forces. Prior to the shooting, he killed a colleague and took his ammunition.	Wissam Khazri	Terrorism in Tunisia
24 May	Suicide bombing	3 (+1)	several	North Waziristan District, Pakistan	2023 North Waziristan suicide bombing	A suicide bomber attacked a security checkpoint. Two soldiers and a civilian died, several others were injured. Four days later, the militant group Jaish Fursan Mohammed claimed responsibility for the attack.	Jaish Fursan Mohammed	Insurgency in Khyber Pakhtunkhwa
8 June	Suicide bombing	19+ (+1)	38	Fayzabad, Afghanistan	2023 Fayzabad mosque bombing	A bomb exploded in a mosque where a memorial service was held for Nisar Ahmad Ahmadi, the governor of Badakhshan who was killed by the Islamic State in the same week. The Islamic State also claimed responsibility for the mosque bombing.	Islamic State – Khorasan Province	Islamic State–Taliban conflict
10 June	Bombing, shooting	9 (+7)	10	Mogadishu, Somalia	2023 Mogadishu hotel attack	Al-Shabaab militants attacked a hotel in Lido Beach. All the attackers were killed by security forces.	Al-Shabaab	Somalia Civil War
16 June	Arson, stabbing	42	8	Mpondwe Lhubiriha Secondary School, Mpondwe, Kasese District, Uganda	Mpondwe school massacre	Militants from Allied Democratic Forces attacked a secondary boarding school in Mpondwe, Uganda with petrol bombs and machetes. The majority of those killed were students of the school.	Allied Democratic Forces	Allied Democratic Forces insurgency
20 June	Shooting	4 (+2)	4	Eli, West Bank	2023 Eli shooting	Two Hamas members shot at Israeli civilians near Eli.	Izzadin al-Qassam brigades	Israeli–Palestinian conflict
4 July	Car ramming and stabbing	1 unborn baby (+1)	9	Tel Aviv, Israel	July 2023 Tel Aviv attack	A Palestinian resident of the West Bank carried out a vehicle-ramming and stabbing attack in Tel Aviv, Israel.	Hamas	Israeli–Palestinian conflict
30 July	Suicide bombing	63+	200+	Khar, Bajaur, Pakistan	2023 Khar bombing	A suicide bomb at a Jamiat Ulema-e-Islam (F) rally in Khar, Bajaur District, Khyber Pakhtunkhwa, Pakistan, killed at least 63 people and injured nearly 200 others.	Islamic State – Khorasan Province	Insurgency in Khyber Pakhtunkhwa
19 August	Bombing	11	2	North Waziristan District, Pakistan	2023 North Waziristan landmine attack	A vehicle transporting laborers drove over a landmine in Shawwal tehsil.	Islamists (suspected)	Insurgency in Khyber Pakhtunkhwa
19 August	Shooting	2	0	Huwara, West Bank	August 2023 Huwara shooting	Two Israelis from Ashdod, arrived in Huwara on Saturday, to service their car. After repairs, the two were at a car wash on Highway 60 south of Hawara. Around 3:04 pm, a Palestinian terrorist arrived, shot them and ran away.	Hamas and Islamic Jihad praised the shooting. Hamas claimed responsibility.	Israeli–Palestinian conflict
26 August	Shooting	3 (+1)	0	Jacksonville, Florida, United States	2023 Jacksonville shooting	A white man shot and killed three black people in a Dollar General store. The shooter killed himself.	Ryan Christopher Palmeter	Domestic terrorism in the United States
7 September	Shooting	64	Unknown	Mopti Region and Gao Region, Mali	September 2023 Mali attacks	Islamist militants attacked a vessel carrying civilians on the Niger River and an army camp in the Bourem Cercle. Al-Qaida claimed responsibility for the attacks.	Jama'at Nasr al-Islam wal Muslimin (JNIM)	Mali War
24 September	Armed assault	4+	8+	Banjska, Zvecan, Kosovo	Banjska attack	Armed assault by Serb militants on the Kosovo Police in the village of Banjska, North Kosovo.	Civilna Zaštita, Severna Brigada	
29 September	Suicide bombing	60	50–70	Mastung District, Balochistan Province, Pakistan	2023 Mastung bombing	Suicide bombing during the procession of the Islamic holiday of Eid Milad-ul-Nabi near a mosque.	Islamic State (suspected)	Insurgency in Balochistan
29 September	Suicide bombing	5	5–12	Doaba, Hangu, Khyber Pakhtunkhwa, Pakistan	Hangu mosque bombing	A vehicle filled with explosives was stopped at the entrance of a mosque in Hangu. One of the attackers detonated an explosive close to the mosque's entrance, while the other blew himself up inside the building.	Unknown	Insurgency in Khyber Pakhtunkhwa
2 October	Bombing and shooting	29 (+3)	2	Tahoua Region, Niger	2023 Tabatol attack	Over 100 armed Islamic State militants attacked Nigerien soldiers near the border with Mali.	Islamic State – Sahil Province	Jihadist insurgency in Niger
7 October	Mass shooting, kidnapping, act of genocide, rocket attacks, torture, rape, burning alive, dismembered to death.	364+	Unknown (The total number of injured on 7 October is over 5,400)	Gaza envelope, Israel	Nova music festival massacre	Hamas militants who had penetrated into Israel from the Gaza Strip during the October 7 massacre attacked a music festival in Re'im. Of the 3500+ people attending the festival, at least 364 people were killed, and many others were wounded or taken hostage.	Hamas	Gaza war
7 October	Mass shooting, stabbing, rape, burning, hand grenades, kidnapping and other means of murder	132+	Unknown (The total number of injured on 7 October is over 5,400)	Kibbutz Be'eri, Israel	Be'eri massacre	In the opening attacks of the 2023 Hamas attack on Israel, around 70 Hamas terrorists carried out a massacre of at least 130 people including women, children and infants.	Hamas	Gaza war
7 October	Shooting, stabbing, burning alive, abduction, rocket fire, grenade bombardment, RPG fire and torture.	52+	Unknown (The total number of injured on 7 October is over 5,400)	Kfar Aza, Israel	Kfar Aza massacre	The attack is notable for claims of brutality in the form of beheadings, dismemberment, burning alive, and reports of the decapitation of babies.	Hamas	Gaza war
7 October	Shooting, Bombings	17	Unknown (The total number of injured on 7 October is over 5,400)	Eshkol Regional Council, Israel	Psyduck music festival massacre	Militants killed seventeen Israeli partygoers at the Psyduck music festival, where 100 people attended, using hand grenades and assault rifles. The attack was a part of the 2023 Hamas-led attack on Israel	Al-Quds Brigades, Al-Qassam Brigades	Gaza war
7 October	Poisoning, Bombing, Kidnapping	81+	Unknown (The total number of injured on 7 October is over 5,400)	Nahal Oz, Israel	Nahal Oz attack	Militants attacked civilians and a military base in Nahal Oz, killing over fifteen civilian's and sixty-six Israel Defense Forces soldiers	Hamas, Palestinian Islamic Jihad	Gaza war
7 October	Shooting, Shootout	34 (+15)	9+	Zikim, Israel	Zikim attack	Militants failed to capture the Bahad 4 training base. In total, 19 civilians and 8 soldiers were killed in attacks. At least 15 militants were also killed.	Hamas	Gaza war
7 October	Bombings, Arson, Shooting	5+	Unknown (The total number of injured on 7 October is over 5,400)	Nirim, Israel	Nirim attack	Militants set homes ablaze, threw grenades and shot people in Nirim. At least five people died in the attack	Hamas	Gaza war
7 October	Shooting, Massacre	22 (+3)	1+	Netiv HaAsara, Israel	Netiv HaAsara massacre	Gunmen attacked Netiv HaAsara killing 22 people, including 21 residents	Hamas	Gaza war
7 October	Shooting, Bombings, Massacre	21-22	Unknown (The total number of injured on 7 October is over 5,400)	Alumim, Israel	Alumim massacre	Militants attacked police, soldiers and Thai and Nepal workers, killing 4 soldiers, 1 police officer and 16 or 17 workers	Hamas	Gaza war
7 October	Massacre, Shooting, Arson, Kidnapping	22	Unknown (The total number of injured on 7 October is over 5,400)	Kissufim, Israel	Kissufim massacre	Militants set houses on fire and shot civilians and soldiers, killing 22 people	Hamas, Democratic Front for the Liberation of Palestine	Gaza war
7 October	Bombings, Hostage Taking, Shooting, Massacre, Arson, Shootout	15 (+52)	8+	Holit, Israel	Holit attack	Militants shot civilians, exploded vehicles and damaged houses using grenades, took civilians hostage and burned houses in a massacre in Holit. 12 residents, 3 workers and at least 52 militants were killed	Hamas	Gaza war
7 October	Shooting, Bombings, Shootout, Hostage Taking	7	2	Nir Yitzhak, Israel	Nir Yitzhak attack	Militants kidnapped seven people before killing security team members and a soldier using snipers. Six security team members and one soldier were killed, and all seven hostages were freed or rescued. The militants left after the attack	Hamas	Gaza war
7-8 October	Shooting, Rocket Attacks	70+ (+10)	Unknown (The total number of injured on 7 October is over 5,400)	Sderot, Israel	Battle of Sderot	Militants attacked a bus, a police station and civilians in Sderot using a bulldozer, guns and rockets. At least 20 police officers and over 50 civilians were killed in the attacks, as well as at least 10 militants	Hamas	Gaza war
8 October	Shooting	3	1	Alexandria, Egypt	Alexandria shooting (2023)	A man assigned as a security guard opened fire on a bus full of Israeli tourists.	Police officer	Gaza war
13 October	Suicide bombing	7	17	Pul-i-Khumri, Afghanistan	2023 Pul-i-Khumri bombing	A bomb exploded in Shia mosque in Pul-i-Khumri, killing over 7 people and wounding 17.	Islamic State – Khorasan Province	Islamic State–Taliban conflict
13 October	Stabbing	1	3	Arras, France	Arras school stabbing	An Islamic extremist went into a school and stabbed and injured multiple school faculty members, killing one.	Mohammed Mogouchkov	Terrorism in France
16 October	Mass shooting	2	1	Brussels, Belgium	2023 Brussels shooting	A supporter of ISIS went into a shop and shot Swedish soccer fans.	Islamic State	Terrorist activity in Belgium
6 November	Mass shooting, arson	30+	Unknown	Mamfe, Cameroon	Egbekaw massacre	The village of Egbekaw was attacked while the villagers were sleeping. Most of the people killed were from Boki, Nigeria. They were hired to protect the village.	Tigers of Ambazonia	Anglophone Crisis
30 November	Mass shooting	3	11	Jerusalem, Israel	2023 Givat Shaul shooting	A Hamas affiliates shot Israelis on a bus stop.	Hamas	Israeli–Palestinian conflict
2 December	Stabbing	1	2	Paris, France	2023 Paris attack	A man attacked three people with a knife and hammer. The attacker, who has pledged alliance to the Islamic State, was arrested by the police.	Islamic State	Terrorism in France
3 December	Bombing	4	50+	Marawi, Philippines	Mindanao State University bombing	A bomb exploded during a Catholic Mass at the gymnasium of Mindanao State University. The Islamic State claimed responsibility.	Islamic State	Terrorism in the Philippines
12 December	Vehicle-ramming, suicide bombing, mass shooting	23 (+1)	34	Daraban, Pakistan	Daraban police station attack	A police station in Daraban was attacked by militants. One of the attackers blew himself up. Tehreek-e-Jihad Pakistan claimed responsibility for the attack.	Tehreek-e-Jihad Pakistan	Insurgency in Khyber Pakhtunkhwa
23–26 December	Massacre	198	500+	Bokkos and Barkin Ladi, Nigeria	2023 Plateau State massacres	Christian villages were attacked in coordinated attacks while preparing for Christmas. Muslim Fulani militias are suspected to be behind the attacks.	Fulani militias (suspected)	Herder–farmer conflicts in Nigeria
