= TJP =

TJP may refer to:

- Tehrik-e Jihad Pakistan, a Pakistani insurgent jihadist group
- Tehrik-e-Jafaria Pakistan, the largest Pakistani Shia organization formerly headed by Arif Hussain Hussaini
- Tiled JPEG File, a filename extension format developed by the Berkeley Digital Library Project which stores several pictures in a single file.
- T. J. Perkins, professional wrestler
- Tight junction protein (disambiguation)
- Tokyo Joshi Pro Wrestling, a Japanese professional wrestling promotion.
