= Mandokhel =

Pashtun tribe

Mandokhail مندوخیل
- Ethnicity: Pashtun
- Location: Zhob, sambaza, Pakistan (Balochistan)
- Parent tribe: Gharghasht
- Language: Pashto
- Religion: Islam

The Mandokhail (Pashto: مندوخیل) is a Pashtun tribe primarily found in northern regions of the Balochistan Province and in southern Afghanistan. Most of the Mandokhails are settled in Zhob District of Balochistan Province, Pakistan; they live on both sides of the Zhob river.

Mandokhail has many subtribes: There are Apozai, Hassanzai, Erabzai, Dawoodkhail, Surhkhail, Mamayzai, Sheikh. Mandokhail tribe is found on the Northern west border of Balochistan which is also known as the Durand line.

The Jirga system of Zhob has historically played an important role in tribal dispute resolution and community decision-making among Pashtun tribes. Respected tribal elder Haji Palay Khan Mandokhail and religious scholar Molana Abdul Hai Mandokhail were regarded as reputed members of local Jirgas, known for their participation in mediation and tribal consultations.

== Notable people ==
- Abdul Rahim Mandokhail was a Pashtun Afghan nationalist and politician who had been a member of the National Assembly of Pakistan, the Provincial Assembly of Balochistan, and the Senate of Pakistan.
- Jamal Khan Mandokhail, He is administrative judge of Supreme court of Pakistan and a former chief justice of Balochistan high court.
- Sheikh Jaffar Khan Mandokhail, He is a Pakistani politician who is currently Governor of Balochistan,
- Fazal Qadir Mandokhail, is a Pakistani politician, He is currently serving as a member of the Provincial Assembly of Balochistan.
- Qadir Mandokhail, is a Pakistani politician who had been a member of the National Assembly of Pakistan.
- Sheikh Zarak Khan Mandokhail is a Pakistani politician. He is currently serving as a member of the Provincial Assembly of Balochistan.
