= 2023 Tank district attack =

2023 militant attack in Pakistan

- Part of Insurgency in Khyber Pakhtunkhwa
- Location: Tank, Tank District, Khyber Pakhtunkhwa, Pakistan
- Date: 15 December 2023
- Target: Khyber Pakhtunkhwa Police; Pakistan Army
- Attack type: Mass shooting; gun battle
- Deaths: 5 Pakistani security forces 5 militants
- Injuries: 3 wounded
- Perpetrator: Ansar ul-Islam
- Defenders: Local police Pakistan Army

On 15 December 2023, two militant attacks targetted a police station and an army camp in Tank, Pakistan. Ansar ul-Islam claimed responsibility for the police station attack in Tank District, Khyber Pakhtunkhwa.

== Attack ==
On the morning of 15 December 2023, militants attacked a police station in Tank district. The attack was repelled by local police, with the militants engaged in a gun battle for hours with the police. The attack came just days after the Daraban police station attack, Pakistan's deadliest terrorist attack in 2023. Local police chief Iftikhar Shah stated that 5 police personnel and 5 militants were killed in the exchange, with another 3 wounded. In a statement, Shah stated, "Our force on guard engaged them in a gun battle for hours". Akhtar Hayat, chief of the Khyber Pakhtunkhwa Police announced that the police was conducting a search operation for "the rest of the militants, including two who suffered wounds". On the same day, the Pakistani Taliban launched an attack on a Pakistani army base near the Afghanistan-Pakistan border, with 2 security personnel killed in an attack in the Khyber District, and another 7 injured.

== Perpetrators ==
Ansar ul-Islam, a relatively newly active militant group, claimed responsibility for the attack as their first attack. The attack came days after the Daraban police station attack.

=== Surge of attacks ===
There has been a surge in terror attacks in Pakistan in 2023 amid a resurgence of the Pakistani Taliban and heightened tensions between Afghanistan and Pakistan, with the Pakistani government accusing Afghanistan of harboring militants and with militants using Afghan territory to launch attacks, although the Afghan government denies this. The attack also comes amidst the mass deportation of Afghans by the Pakistani government.

== See also ==
- List of terrorist incidents in 2023
- Terrorist incidents in Pakistan in 2023
