= Ministry of Foreign Affairs of Afghanistan bombing =

2023 explosion in Kabul

Ministry of Foreign Affairs bombing in Afghanistan
- Part of Afghan conflict
- Kabul (Afghanistan)
- Location: Kabul, Afghanistan
- Date: 11 January 2023
- Attack type: Suicide bombing
- Deaths: 20+
- Perpetrator: Islamic State – Khorasan Province

On 11 January 2023, an Islamic State suicide bomber killed at least 20 people in Kabul, Afghanistan.

== Background ==
The Islamic State–Taliban conflict began in 2015. IS increased the frequency of their insurgency in 2021, as foreign forces left the country.

== Bombing ==
On 11 January 2023, at least 20 people were killed in a suicide bombing outside the Ministry of Foreign Affairs in Kabul, Afghanistan. Islamic State – Khorasan Province claimed responsibility for the explosion.

A suicide bomber detonated outside the Taliban foreign ministry office in Kabul, reportedly during the visit of a Chinese delegation.

== Aftermath ==
The Ministry of Foreign Affairs of Afghanistan was again targeted in another suicide bombing on 27 March 2023, killing six people.

== See also ==
- List of terrorist incidents linked to Islamic State – Khorasan Province
- List of terrorist attacks in Kabul
- List of terrorist incidents in 2023
- List of massacres in Afghanistan
