= Operation Radd-ul-Fasaad =

Pakistani military operation against terrorist organizations

- Part of the Insurgency in Khyber Pakhtunkhwa, the Insurgency in Balochistan, Sectarian violence in Pakistan, terrorism in Pakistan and the war on terror
Date	23 February 2017 – 22 July 2024
Location	Pakistan
Result	Operation Azm-e-Istehkam continues; 375,000 intelligence-based operations conducted as of 2021; Terrorist group cells dismantled; Major reduction of terrorist incidents; Afghanistan-Pakistan border barrier erected; New wave of terrorism in Pakistan since the fall of Kabul

Belligerents
Government of Pakistan; Ministry of Defence; Pakistan Armed Forces; Pakistan Army; Pakistan Air Force; Pakistan Navy; Ministry of Interior; Civil Armed Forces; Frontier Corps; Pakistan Rangers; (on border) Pakistan Police; CTD; Pakistani Intelligence community; NACTA; ISI; IB; MI; FIA; FIU; SB	Taliban-aligned groups; (Afghanistan) Taliban (major in the Durand Line border skirmishes); Al-Qaeda; Haqqani network; Tehrik-i-Taliban Pakistan; Jamaat-ul-Ahrar; Baloch Separatist groups; BLA; BLF; BNA (2022–2023); BRA (2006–2022, 2023 as part of BNA); UBA (2013–2022, 2023 as part of BNA); Supported by: Afghanistan; ISIL-aligned groups; Islamic State-Khorasan Province; Jundallah (From 2014); (Islamic State) Islamic Movement of Uzbekistan (From 2015); Tehreek-e-Khilafat (From 2014); Sectarian groups; Sipah-e-Sahaba; Jaish ul-Adl; Lashkar-e-Jhangvi

Commanders and leaders
Pakistan; President: Asif Ali Zardari; Prime Minister: Shehbaz Sharif; Foreign Minister: Muhammad Ishaq Dar; Interior Minister: Mohsin Raza Naqvi; Minister of Defence: Khawaja Asif; Defence Secretary: Hamood Uz Zaman; Opposition Leader: Omar Ayub Khan; Army Chief: Asim Munir; Chairman JCSC: Sahir Shamshad Mirza; DG ISI: Nadeem Anjum; DG ISPR: Ahmed Sharif Chaudhry; Air Chief: Zaheer Ahmad Babar; Naval Chief: Naveed Ashraf; General of SSG: Major General Adil Rehmani; Governor of Balochistan: Abdul Wali Kakar; Chief Minister of Balochistan: Sarfraz Bugti; Governor of Khyber Pakhtunkhwa: Haji Ghulam Ali; Chief Minister of Khyber Pakhtunkhwa: Ali Amin Gandapur; Former: Mamnoon Hussain; Arif Alvi; Nawaz Sharif; Shahid Khaqan Abbasi; Nasirul Mulk; Imran Khan; Anwaar ul Haq Kakar; Sartaj Aziz; Khawaja Muhammad Asif; Khurram Dastgir Khan; Abdullah Hussain Haroon; Shah Mahmood Qureshi; Bilawal Bhutto Zardari; Jalil Abbas Jilani; Chaudhary Nisar Ali Khan; Ahsan Iqbal; Azam Suleman Khan; Imran Khan; Ijaz Ahmed Shah; Sheikh Rasheed Ahmad; Rana Sanaullah; Sarfraz Bugti; Gohar Ejaz; Khurram Dastgir Khan; Abdullah Hussain Haroon; Pervez Khattak; Anwar Ali Haider; Zamir ul Hassan Shah; Ikram ul Haq; Mian Hilal Hussain; Syed Khurshid Ahmed Shah; Shehbaz Sharif; Raja Riaz Ahmad Khan; Qamar Javed Bajwa; Zubair Mahmood Hayat; Nadeem Raza; Naveed Mukhtar; Asim Munir; Faiz Hameed; Asif Ghafoor; Babar Iftikhar; Sohail Aman; Mujahid Anwar Khan; Muhammad Zakaullah; Zafar Mahmood Abbasi; Amjad Khan Niazi; Major general Tahir Masood Bhutta; Major general Mumtaz Hussain; Muhammad Khan Achakzai; Amanullah Khan Yasinzai; Syed Zahoor Ahmad Agha; Jan Mohammad Jamali; Sanaullah Khan Zehri; Abdul Quddus Bizenjo; Alauddin Marri; Jam Kamal Khan; Ali Mardan Khan Domki; Iqbal Zafar Jhagra; Shah Farman; Pervez Khattak; Dost Muhammad Khan; Mahmood Khan; Muhammad Azam Khan; Arshad Hussain Shah	Al-Qaeda: Ayman al-Zawahiri †; Saif al-Adel; Islamic State of Iraq and the Levant: Abu Hafs al-Hashimi al-Qurashi; Abu al-Hussein al-Husseini al-Qurashi †; Abu al-Hasan al-Hashimi al-Qurashi †; Abu Ibrahim al-Hashimi al-Qurashi †; Abu Bakr al-Baghdadi †; Asadullah Orakzai †; Jamaat-ul-Ahrar: Omar Khalid Khorasani †; Ehsanullah Ehsan (surrendered); Asad Afridi †; Shamsher †; Muhammad Daudzai †; Tehrik-i-Taliban Pakistan: Noor Wali Mehsud; Maulana Qazi Fazlullah †; Qari Saifullah Mehsud †; Sheikh Khalid Haqqani †; Badshah Khan Mehsud †; Naik Muhammad †; Abdul Jabbar Shah †; Button Kharab †; Khawarey Mullah †; Sarbakaf Mohmand †; Muhammad Khurasani †; Asadullah Pehelwan †; Bali Khiara †; Saifullah Babuji †; Abdul Aneer alias Adil †; Junaid alias Jamid †; Khaliq Shadeen alias Rehan †; Nooristan alias Hasan Baba †; Chamtu Waziristani †; Sheryar Mehsud †; Mufti Borjan †; Uqabi Bajauri †; Zakeeren †; Naik Rehman †; Rafiullah †; Ikramullah †; Ahmedi †; Sadiq Noor †; Aleem Khan †; Abu Darda †; Inqilaabi Mehsud †; Khawaza Din †; Jaabir †; Hassan Alias Sajna †; Khalid Ahmed †; Liaquat †; Safiullah †; Zabiullah †; Toor Hafiz †; Hasan Alias Sajna †; Cobra Mehsud †; Nooristan alias Hasan Baba †; Khushali †; Chargh †; Maulvi Zubair †; Samiullah alias Sheena †; Ihsan Ullah alias Ihsan Sanray †; Commander Rahzaib alias Khurray †; Syed Raheem alias Abid †; Saifullah Noor †; Samiullah alias Shenay †; Lashkar-e-Jhangvi: Qari Mohammad Yasi †; Balochistan Liberation Army: Hyrbyair Marri; Aslam Baloch Achu †; Baloch Republican Army: Brahumdagh Bugti; Baluch Liberation Front: Allah Nazar Baloch; United Baloch Army: Mehran Marri; Lashkar-e-Balochistan: Javed Mengal; Balochistan Liberation United Front: Brahumdagh Bugti; Lashkar-e-Islam: Mangal Bagh †; Fazal Ameen †; Jundallah (Pakistan): Abdul Haseeb Logari †; Abdul Rahman Ghaleb †; Abu Saad Erhabi †; Islamic Movement of Uzbekistan: Abdul Haseeb Logari †; Abdul Rahman Ghaleb †; Abu Saad Erhabi †; Jundallah (Iran): Muhammad Dhahir Baluch; Jaish ul-Adl: Salahuddin Farooqui; Sipah-e-Sahaba: Awrangzib Faruqi

Casualties and losses
440+ soldiers killed 1,450+ Injured	7,000+ militants killed 1,319+ militants surrendered 2,000+ militants arrested 7,300+ suspects arrested 500+ executed after being arrested or surrendered
- 940+ civilians killed

Operation Radd-ul-Fasaad (Urdu: آپریشن رد الفساد; lit. 'Rejection of Strife') was a combined military operation by the Pakistani military in support of local law enforcement agencies to disarm and eliminate the terrorist sleeper cells across all states of Pakistan, started on 22 February 2017. The operation aimed to eliminate the threat of terrorism, and consolidating the gains of Operation Zarb-e-Azb which was launched in 2014 as a joint military offensive. It was further aimed at ensuring the security of Pakistan's borders. The operation underwent active participation from the Pakistan Army, Pakistan Air Force, Pakistan Navy, Pakistan Police and other Warfare and Civil Armed Forces managed under the Government of Pakistan. More than 375,000 intelligence-based operations had been carried out as of 2021. This operation has been mostly acknowledged after Operation Zarb e Azb.

Pakistan had faced the worst brunt of terrorism due to its proximity to the all-time unstable Afghanistan and radicalization injected into the region since the Soviet-Afghan War that started in 1979. Offering land to host global Jihadism in the 80s changed the social fabric, resulting in a massive onslaught of terrorism that Pakistan had gone through since then. The pinnacle of infusion of venom by the multi-headed serpent of radicalization and terrorism was the era of 2006-2014. Pakistan Army fought terrorism gallantry and became the only army in the world that defeated terrorism without external help through several military operations, the biggest such operation was "Operation Zarb-e-Azb" which was started in June 2014. This operation successfully eliminated terrorist hideouts, nurseries, and breeding grounds in urban as well as far-flung areas. However, Pakistan could not be left without placing a mechanism that could ensure continuity and sustainability in anti-terrorism efforts to consolidate the gains achieved through Operation Zarb-e-Azb. The change of command was crucial and after the retirement of Raheel Sharif it was understood that the long-lasting success of Operation Zarb-e-Azb was depending upon a leadership that could manage the rehabilitation of internally displaced people in the former Federally Administrative Tribal Areas (FATA areas), Swat Valley and all other Afghan bordering areas.

The operation entailed the conduct of Broad Spectrum Security (Counter Terrorism) operations by Rangers in Punjab, continuation of ongoing operations across the country and focus on more effective border security management. Countrywide disarmament and explosive control were also given as additional objectives of the operation. The National Action Plan was pursued as the hallmark of this operation.

== Etymologies ==
Radd-ul-Fasaad (Urdu: رد الفساد) literally means "elimination of strife". Radd means "rejection". Fasaad is synonymous to the Arabic word Fitna which means "civil strife".

== Background ==
In the month of February 2017, the terrorist group Jamaat-ul-Ahrar launched Operation Ghazi with several suicide attacks across Pakistan. According to media, Jammat-ul-Ahrar claimed the responsibility of these terror attacks. After this, many other terrorist groups started terrorist attacks often across all over Pakistan, quickly Pakistan announced the launch of Operation Radd-ul-Fasaad. On the 4th Anniversary of the Operation, a database was launched on 22 February 2021, covering all news of terrorism, operations, and killings during this Operation.

== Major terror attacks ==
=== January 2017 Parachinar bombing ===
On 21 January 2017, a bomb was detonated at a vegetable market in Parachinar, in the Kurram Valley of the Federally Administered Tribal Areas of Pakistan. At least 25 people were killed and 87 injured by the explosion. Parachinar is the administrative headquarters of the Kurram Agency near the Afghan border. The same area has previously seen several blasts in 2008, February 2012, September 2012, 2013 and in December 2015.

=== February 2017 Lahore suicide bombing ===
On 13 February 2017, a suicide bombing took place on the Mall Road in Lahore, Pakistan, where a large crowd of pharmaceutical manufacturers and owners, herbal manufacturers, homeopathic manufacturers, wholesalers, pharmaceutical marketeers, chemists, stockists, distributors, doctors and pharmacists were holding a protest at Charing Cross in front of the Punjab provincial assembly. According to Punjab Police sources, 18 people were killed including several police officials, and at least 87 were injured.

Jamaat-ul-Ahrar, a faction of the banned Tehrik-i-Taliban (TTP), claimed responsibility for the attack. Local authorities cordoned off the site to begin investigations. According to Pakistani authorities, the attack was orchestrated from Afghanistan, where the militant group operates sanctuaries. On 23 February, Pakistani security forces killed the mastermind of the attack, Wajihullah, near the Afghan border following the launch of Operation Radd-ul-Fasaad.

=== 2017 Sehwan suicide bombing ===
On 16 February 2017, a suicide bombing took place inside the Shrine of Lal Shahbaz Qalandar in Sehwan, Sindh, Pakistan, where pilgrims were performing a Sufi ritual after the evening prayers. At least 90 people were killed and over 300 injured.

=== 2017 Charsadda suicide bombing ===
On 21 February 2017, suicide bombers targeted a sessions court in Tangi, Charsadda District, Khyber Pakhtunkhwa, Pakistan. At least 7 people were killed, including a lawyer and more than 20 others injured. Tehrik-i-Taliban Pakistan faction Jamaat-ul-Ahrar claimed responsibility for the attack.

=== March 2017 Parachinar suicide bombing ===
On 31 March 2017, a car bombing took place at a market in Parachinar, northwest Pakistan. The bombing was believed to be motivated by sectarianism, as the majority of the area's residents are Shia Muslims. At least 24 people were killed and more than 70 injured as a result of the blast. Prime Minister Nawaz Sharif and other political leaders condemned the attack.

=== 2017 Mastung suicide bombing ===
On 12 May 2017, a suicide bombing targeted the convoy of the Deputy Chairman of the Senate of Pakistan, Abdul Ghafoor Haideri, a JUI (F) member, on the N-25 National Highway in Mastung District, Balochistan, Pakistan. At least 28 people were killed; 40 others were injured, including the Senator. The Islamic State of Iraq and the Levant claimed responsibility for the attack. The attack was an unsuccessful attempt to assassinate Haideri.

=== Gwadar Labors shooting ===
On 13 May 2017, two militants of the Baloch Liberation Army (BLA) riding on a motorcycle opened fire on group of laborers working in Gwadar, Balochistan, Pakistan. The road where these labourers were working was one of a network of connecting roads that form part of the China-Pakistan Economic Corridor (CPEC) project. The gunfire resulted in the death of 10 labourers. A spokesman for the BLA claimed responsibility of attack.

=== June 2017 Pakistan bombings ===
On 23 June 2017, a series of terrorist attacks took place in Pakistan resulting in 96 dead and over 200 wounded. They included a suicide bombing in Quetta targeting policemen, followed by two blasts at a market in Parachinar, and the targeted killing of four policemen in Karachi.

=== Lahore Bombings ===
On 24 July 2017, a suicide bombing took place in a vegetable market in Lahore, Pakistan. 26 people were killed and 58 others were wounded as a result of the explosion. Security officials believe that the attack targeted policemen, as there were 9 killed and 6 wounded. Tehreek-i-Taliban Pakistan claimed responsibility for the attack.

=== August 2017 Quetta suicide bombing ===
On 5 October 2017, a suicide bomber targeted the shrine of Pir Rakhel Shah situated in Fatehpur, a small town in Gandawah tehsil of Jhal Magsi District in Pakistan's southwestern Balochistan province. At least 20 people, including two policemen, were killed and more than 30 others injured in the suicide attack.

=== 2017 Peshawar police vehicle attack ===
On 24 November 2017, a suicide bomber struck the vehicle of AIG Ashraf Noor in Hayatabad, Peshawar while he was travelling to work as a result of which the vehicle caught fire killing Ashraf Noor and his guard. In the attack eight others police in the AIG's squad were injured as a result of the blast and they were taken to Hayatabad Medical Complex for treatment

=== 2017 Peshawar Agriculture Directorate attack ===
On 1 December 2017, 3–4 gunmen arrived at the hostel of Agricultural Training Institute at Agricultural University Peshawar and started firing as a result of which at least 13 people were killed and 35+ were injured. Tehreek-e-Taliban claimed responsibility for the attack.

=== 2017 Quetta church attack ===
The 2017 Quetta church attack took place on 17 December 2017 when armed militants and suicide bombers stormed the Bethel Memorial Methodist Church in the western Pakistani city of Quetta, killing nine people and injuring dozens more. The attack was perpetrated by the Islamic State, who claimed responsibility through its Amaq media outlet.

=== 2018 Peshawar suicide bombing ===
On 10 July 2018, a suicide bombing occurred at the Awami National Party's workers rally in Yaka Toot area of Peshawar, Khyber Pakhtunkhwa, Pakistan. Haroon Bilour, ANP's candidate for PK-78 and prime target of the attack, was killed as a result of the bombing. The attack left 22 people dead and wounded 75 others. Tehreek-i-Taliban Pakistan claimed responsibility for the attack.

=== 2018 Mastung and Bannu bombings ===
On 13 July 2018, ahead of the Pakistan's general election, two bombings took place at election rallies in Bannu and Mastung.

In Bannu, a remotely exploded bomb planted in a motorcycle left 5 people dead and 37 others wounded in an unsuccessful attempt to assassinate former Khyber Pakhtunkhwa chief minister Akram Khan Durrani. Ittehad-ul-Mujahideen, an extremist organization, claimed responsibility for the attack.

In Mastung, a suicide bomber blew himself up during a rally for the Balochistan Awami Party's Siraj Raisani, the brother of former Balochistan chief minister Aslam Raisani. One of the deadliest terrorist attacks in Pakistani history, it killed 149 people and wounded 186 others. Siraj was taken to hospital in critical condition and died of injuries. The Islamic State of Iraq and the Levant (ISIL) claimed responsibility for the event and named the suicide bomber as Abu Bakar al-Pakistani, though authorities identified him as Hafeez Nawaz of Abbottabad.

=== 2018 Kulachi suicide bombing ===
On 22 July 2018, 3 days before general elections, a suicide bomber blew himself near the vehicle of former KPK provincial minister of Agriculture Ikramullah Khan Gandapur in Kulachi, Dera Ismail Khan District, Pakistan. The prime target of attack, Gandapur was brought to Dera Ismail Khan in critical condition where he succumbed to his wounds. Apart from Gandapur, his driver and one of his guards was also killed and three more people were injured. Tehrik-i-Taliban Pakistan (TTP) claimed responsibility for the assault describing Gandapur's killing of their colleague militants as the motive. The attack was widely condemned across Pakistan.

=== 2018 Quetta suicide bombing ===
On 25 July 2018, during polling for the 2018 Pakistani general election, a bomb blast outside a polling station in Quetta's Eastern Bypass area resulted in 31 people being killed and over 35 injured. Islamic State of Iraq and the Levant claimed responsibility for the attack, according to the group's Amaq News Agency.

=== January 2019 Loralai attack ===
2019 Loralai attack took place on 29 January 2019 in Loralai, Pakistan. 9 people including 8 policemen and a civilian were killed while 22 others were injured when gunmen and suicide bombers attacked a Deputy Inspector General's (DIG) office. The Tehrik-i-Taliban Pakistan claimed responsibility for the attack.

=== February 2019 Balochistan attacks ===
On 16 February 2019, armed men killed two Frontier Corps in Loralai. On 17 February 2019, two security personnel of the Frontier Corps were killed in the Gardab area of Panjgur district. The attack was carried out by the Baloch Raji Ajoi Sangar (BRAS), an alliance of three Balochi separatist organizations, the Baloch Liberation Army, Balochistan Liberation Front and Baloch Republican Guard. Some sources claimed that around nine military personnel were killed and eleven personnel were injured in the suicide attack, while others said four individuals were killed in Panjgur while other two were killed in Loralai.

=== 2019 Hazarganji blast ===
On 12 April 2019, a bomb exploded at an open market in Quetta, Pakistan. The attack reportedly left 20 dead. The bombing took place near an area where many minority Shiite Muslims live. At least nine Shiites were among the dead, one paramilitary soldier and other people were also killed in the bombing. PM Imran Khan condoled the lives lost, directed the authorities to ensure the best medical treatment for the injured and order to increase the security of Shiites and Hazara People. Lashkar-e-Jhangvi accepted the responsibility for the attack, stated "their target were Hazara people."

=== 2019 Makran Massacre ===
On 18 April 2019, gunmen shot several passengers travelling from Karachi to Gwadar. An estimated 15 to 20 armed militants stopped around five or six buses between 12:30am and 1am on a Makran Coastal Road. After the buses halted the gunmen then inspected the identity papers of the passengers and had about 16 of them disembark. At least 14 were shot dead, while two passengers managed to escape from the gunmen and travelled to the closest Balochistan Levies checkpost. They were later transported to Ormara Hospital for treatment. Law enforcement and Levies personnel arrived at the scene shortly afterward and commenced an investigation into the attack. The victims bodies were taken from the Noor Baksh Hotel. The Baloch Raaji Aajoi Sangar (BRAS), An alliance of ethnic Baloch separatist armed groups has taken responsibility for the massacre in an email statement. "... those who were targeted carried [identification] cards of the Pakistan Navy and Coast Guards, and they were only killed after they were identified." Raaji Aajoi Sangar, the spokesperson for the Baloch, said in the statement.

=== 2019 Lahore bombing ===
2019 Lahore bombing was a suicide bomb attack on 8 May 2019 outside Data Darbar in Lahore, Pakistan killed at least 13 people including five policemen and injured at least 24. CCTV footage of the blast showed the bomber targeted an Elite Police mobile parked outside the shrine. Hizbul Ahrar – a splinter group of Jamaat-ul-Ahrar and Tehrik-i-Taliban Pakistan- had claimed responsibility for the attack.

=== 2020 ===
On 15 October 2020, at least 14 security personnel were killed in the first incident after a convoy of state-run Oil & Gas Development Company (OGDCL) was attacked on the coastal highway in Balochistan's Ormara, Radio Pakistan reported.

== See also ==
Timeline of Operation Radd-ul-Fasaad
