= July 2023 Zhob military base attack =

Attack on Pakistani military post

- Part of Insurgency in Balochistan
Date	July 12, 2023
Location	Zhob, Balochistan, Pakistan
Result	Pakistani victory

Belligerents
Pakistan	Tehreek-e-Jihad

Strength
Unknown	5

Casualties and losses
9 killed ~12 injured	5 killed
- 1 civilian killed, 5 civilians injured

On July 12, 2023, militants from Tehreek-e-Jihad Pakistan (TJP) attacked a Pakistani military post and a civilian bus in Zhob, Balochistan, Pakistan. Nine soldiers were killed in the attack, the first attack on a miliary base by a Tehreek-e-Taliban (TTP) affiliate in Balochistan since December 2022. The attack came a week after the assassination of four police officers by TJP on July 2.

== Background ==
Since 2022, Tehreek-e-Taliban has expanded across Pakistan into Balochistan, absorbing four existing Balochi militant groups and establishing Balochi-language propaganda networks. Militant groups like TTP and its affiliates were extremely active in the first half of 2023, with a 79% uptick in attacks compared to the previous year; 271 attacks took place, leaving 371 people dead.

Tehreek-e-Jihad Pakistan (TJP) was formed in May 2025 and began carrying out attacks, but was not an official part of the TTP. On July 2, four police officers were killed in an attack on several police checkpoints in Zhob by TJP.

== Attack ==
The attack took place in the early morning of July 12. Five militants took part in the attack, and Pakistani authorities said an initial attempt by the militants to sneak into the Pakistani military base at Zhob was "checked by soldiers on duty." Clashes then broke out between the militants and the soldiers in a small area on the edge of the base. The fighting lasted until noon, when all five militants were killed. Nine soldiers were confirmed killed in the attack, and at least a dozen others were injured.

The TJP militants were also active in the city of Zhob itself. In the crossfire, a civilian bus coming from Dera Ismail Khan and bound for Quetta was shot at, killing a woman and injuring five others.

== Aftermath ==
Pakistani security sources said that search operations for remaining TJP militants or sympathizers occurred in Zhob after the attack. The Zhob attack occurred on the same day as another attack in Sui, which left three soldiers dead.

After the attack, hardline TTP affiliate Jamaat-ul-Ahrar (JuA) declared responsibility for the attack. The TTP denied JuA's statement, and claimed that "brother organization" TJP conducted the attack. The Critical Threats Project assessed that TJP's claim was a way for the TTP to conduct attacks with plausible deniability; the JuA leader who made his group's claim was sacked after TJP claimed responsibility. The JuA claim inflamed intra-TTP tensions, with Critical Threats claiming that JuA may defect to the Islamic State – Khorasan Province.
