= Tehreek-e-Jihad Pakistan =

Pakistani Islamist insurgent group

- تحریک جہاد پاکستان
- Logo of the Tehreek-e-Jihad-Pakistan
- Other name: TJP
- Founder: Maulana Abdullah Yaghistani
- Leader: Maulana Abdullah Yaghistani
- Dates active: 2023–?
- Allegiance: Afghanistan
- Headquarters: Paktika, Afghanistan
- Active regions: Khyber Pakhtunkhwa, Pakistan
- Ideology: Deobandi jihadism Sectarianism; Islamic fundamentalism
- Status: Inactive (no reported activity beyond 2023)
- Part of: Pakistani Taliban (alleged)

Tehreek-e-Jihad Pakistan (Urdu: تحریک جہاد پاکستان, lit. 'Pakistani Jihad Movement'; abbr. TJP) (Note: Tehreek is alternatively Romanized as 'Tehrik' and the possessive '-e-' variably as '-i-') is an inactive insurgent Deobandi jihadist group in Pakistan that has gained notoriety for its involvement in attacks on Pakistani military and police targets. The group is believed to have been founded in February 2023 and has claimed violent attacks against Pakistani police, security, and military installations in various provinces of Pakistan.

== History ==
=== Founding manifesto ===
Tehreek-e-Jihad Pakistan (TJP) first appeared in February 2023 when it created an official Twitter account 'TehreekJ Pakistan' and, on 24 February, posted its first tweet announcing the group's formal establishment. In the tweet, the group wrote "#TJP" and "ہمارا منشور", Urdu for "Our manifesto", (Note: 'منشور' can be translated as 'charter', 'declaration', or 'manifesto') as well as an Urdu-language image titled "Announcement of the Establishment of Tehreek-e-Jihad Pakistan". The proclamation, signed in Urdu as "Tehreek-e-Jihad Pakistan Spokesman", begins with the announcement of a decision reached by "long consultations of the great scholars of Sami-ul-Haqq" (referring to the famous Deobandi jihadist scholar named Father of the Taliban) to found a group dedicated towards continuing the movement of Sheikh al-Hind (Mahmund Hasan Deobandi). In the charter's second paragraph, TJP explains its purported previous reluctance to emerge from silence into armed struggle against the Pakistani state, which TJP believes to be dominated by a lobby of 'secular classes'.

Despite the passage of more than 75 years [since Creation], we have not seen any practical implementation of the ideology of Pakistan while the secular lobby continues to dig its claws into the society, so we consider further waiting and silence as an expectation of crime and divine punishment. But we have come to the conclusion that is not possible to implement the Islamic system in Pakistan without armed jihad, and it is in this context we are guided by the great scholars of Deoband. Maulana Abdullah announces a new organization under the leadership of Pakistani for the establishment of Islamic system: Tehreek Jihad Pakistan in the name of "Pakistan".

The manifesto concludes with an invitation to political supporters of Deobandi political parties, likely most directed at followers of Jamiat Ulema-e-Islam, to abandon political solutions for the Islamization of Pakistan in favor of TJP's armed struggle (jihad) against Pakistani military and security forces, targets TJP sees as defenders of a secular institution.

To achieve this goal, hundreds of mujahideen and tens of devotees of Islam are ready to sacrifice their lives at all times, God willing. We also invite other religious and political parties in Pakistan that have learned through the last 75 years that no results are obtained through political means. You gentlemen should stand by our side for the implementation of Islamic system in Pakistan. Among our targets are the security institutions imposed on Pakistan, who are the real defenders of this illegitimate system. May God bless you.

In the first three months, the published manifesto received thirteen likes and over 4,600 views on the Twitter (now X) platform.

=== Operations ===
TJP claimed its first attack on 6 March 2023 and claimed the attack by tweet the same day. In Kachhi District (formerly Bolan) of Pakistan's southwestern Balochistan Province, a suicide bomber mounted on a motorcycle rammed into a police van carrying officers from the city of Sibi to the provincial capital of Quetta and detonated his explosives, killing at least 9 and injuring 13. Both TJP and the Islamic State's Pakistan Province (Wilayah Pakistan) issued claims for the attack. In Issue #381 of the Islamic State's Arabic-language an-Naba newsletter, the attack made front page and the corresponding article claimed responsibility for the attack. In the article, the Islamic State published a picture of purported attacker and his alias, Abdul Rahman al-Pakistani, in front of the group's flag.

On 25 April, TJP claimed via a tweet that it was responsible for an attack in Kabal Tehsil, Swat District of Khyber Pakhtunkhwa Province. The day prior, an explosion struck a Counter-Terrorism Department (CTD) building, killing 17 and injuring more than 50 others.

Days later, on 28 April, a motorcycle-mounted suicide bomber detonated his explosives at a security post in Lakki Marwat District of Khyber Pakhtunkhwa occupied by the Pakistani Frontier Corps and Army forces which triggered an hour-long firefight between three more attackers and military forces, killing three Pakistani Army soldiers. That day, TJP issued a claim of responsibility for the attack and named three "martyrdom seekers": Abuzar Shaheed, (Note: 'Shaheed' is the Arabic term for a religious martyr) Muhammad Ilyas, Sanaullah, and Shakirullh.

Locations of attacks claimed by TJP

On 12 May 2023, a group of six attackers attacked a Frontier Corps camp in the town of Muslim Bagh in Killa Saifullah District, Balochistan with rifles and rocket-propelled grenades (RPGs), reportedly holding hostages, until a rescue operation was conducted by the Pakistani military. A retaliatory clearance operation the next day killed four remaining attackers at the cost of seven soldiers and one civilian killed as well as six others wounded. TJP claimed the attack and named the attackers as Hamza, Zakariya, Abu Bakr, Maulana Hazala, Mustaghfir, and Mutassim Billah.

Two months later, on 12 July 2023, seven militants stormed a Pakistani Army garrison in Zhob District, Balochistan, killing five soldiers and a civilian as well as wounding at least five others. Four of the militants were killed in the attack with the remaining two reportedly killed later. TJP claimed responsibility for the attack.

On 4 November 2023, nine militants attacked the Pakistani Air Force (PAF) Base M.M. Alam in the city of Mianwali in the country's northeastern province of Punjab. The militants reportedly scaled the perimeter walls around 3:00 AM and caused significant damage to three supposedly-grounded (nonoperational) aircraft and destroyed a fuel tank. TJP claimed responsibility for the attack.

On 12 December 2023, a militants rammed a vehicle-borne improvised explosive device (VBIED) into the main gate of a police station in Daraban Tehsil, Dera Ismail Khan District, Khyber Pakhtunkhwa, detonating a 264-pound (120-kilogram) explosive charge. Subsequently, five other attackers initiated an hours-long firefight, killing at least 23 and injuring another 34. TJP claimed responsibility for the attack. In video of attack released by TJP, the organization claimed its attackers came from Lakki Marwat, Dera Ismail Khan, Swat, and Mardan districts of Khyber Pakhtunkhwa

=== List of attacks ===
List of attacks claimed by Tehreek-e-Jihad Pakistan
| Date | Country | Province | Location | Target | Assailants | Means | Killed | Wounded | Article | Cites |
|---|---|---|---|---|---|---|---|---|---|---|
| 6 March 2023 | Pakistan | Balochistan | Kachhi | Police | 1 | Motorcycle-borne SVIED | 9 | 13 | Bolan suicide bombing | |
| 25 April 2023 | Pakistan | Khyber Pakhtunkhwa | Kabal | Counter-Terrorism Department | Unknown | Unknown | 17 | 50 | 2023 Kabal explosions | |
| 28 April 2023 | Pakistan | Khyber Pakhtunkhwa | Lakki Marwat | Frontier Corps | 4 | Motorcycle-borne SVIED | 3 | Unknown | None | |
| 12 May 2023 | Pakistan | Balochistan | Muslim Bagh | Frontier Corps | 6 | Rifles, RPGs | 7 | 12 | 2023 Muslim Bagh attack | |
| 12 July 2023 | Pakistan | Balochistan | Zhob | Army | 6 | Rifles, grenades, RPGs | 5 | 5 | July 2023 Zhob military base attack | |
| 4 November 2023 | Pakistan | Punjab | Mianwali | Air Force | 9 | Rifles, RPGs | 3 aircraft damaged | | Mianwali air base attack | |
| 12 December 2023 | Pakistan | Khyber Pakhtunkhwa | Daraban | Police | 6 | VBIED, Rifles | 23 | 34 | Daraban police station attack | |

== Membership ==
According to an interview with The Khorasan Diary, an independent, English-language research group based in Islamabad, Mullah Mohammad Qasim claimed to be the groups spokesperson and named Maulana Abdullah Yaghistani as the group's founder and current emir. Qasim explained that the organization comprised veteran mujahideen who had fought against both the Soviet Union and United States in Afghanistan and sought "a continuation of the Silk Letter Movement", referencing a Deobandi-led independence movement against British Colonial rule in India between 1913 and 1920. Also in the interview, Qaism rejected a fatwa issued by Pakistan's chief Deobandi scholar, Mufti Taqi Usmani, which rejected armed struggle against Pakistan outright under Islamic law, musing the decree appeared to be motivated more by personal reasoning than Islamic law.

Maulana Abdullah Yaghistani's name refers to the historical region of Yaghirstan, a broad term encompassing Pashtun tribal areas on the western frontier of British India that resisted annexation. According to Anatol Lieven, renowned for his authorship on the Taliban and Pakistan, the name 'Yaghistan' can be translated to the land of lawlessness, rebellion, or dissent.

== Alleged connections with Pakistani Taliban ==
Though Tehreek-e-Jihad Pakistan claims to be an independent militant organization, Pakistani security officials allege the group is a cover for Tehreek-e-Taliban Pakistan (known as TTP or Pakistani Taliban), to avoid public condemnation. Others allege that TJP is a TTP ploy to continue attacks in Pakistan without fanning of the flames of Pakistani accusations that the Afghan Taliban government is providing safe haven for TTP militants conducting attacks into Pakistan. The TTP deny any relationship with TJP, adding instead "most likely they consist of people who either we know or are former affiliates who might have formed a group of their own. However we are trying to find out more about them." TTP has historically undergone a number of fractures, creating various splinter groups.

A January 2024 report from the monitoring team of the United Nations Security Council's ISIL & Al-Qaeda Sanctions Committee noted the emergence of TJP and explained that it, along with the TTP, operated from within Afghanistan's borders to conduct attacks in Pakistan. The report acknowledged that TJP was "reported to be a front for TTP, possibly with support from Al-Qaida, providing plausibility".
