= 2023 Zhob suicide attack =

2023 suicide bombing in Balochistan, Pakistan

2023 Zhob Suicide Attack
- Location: Zhob district, Balochistan, Pakistan
- Date: 19 May 2023
- Target: Convoy of Sirajul Haq
- Attack type: Suicide attack
- Weapon: Explosive device
- Deaths: 1 (suicide attacker)
- Injuries: 6
- Motive: Terrorism

On 19 May 2023, a suicide bomber attacked the convoy of Sirajul Haq, the emir of Jamaat-i-Islami (JI) in Zhob district, Balochistan, Pakistan. The attack left Haq and five others injured, while also killing the attacker. Numerous people condemned the incident and demanded a thorough investigation.

== Background ==
At the time of the attack, Jamaat-i-Islami leader Sirajul Haq was in the Zhob neighborhood to speak to a political gathering. Although the attack's motivation is still unknown, terrorism is thought to be the cause.

== The attack ==
An explosive device was set off by a suicide bomber who approached Sirajul Haq's convoy as it passed through Zhob. Six people were hurt and some of the convoy's vehicles were damaged as a result of the explosion. Haq himself, however, managed to flee unharmed.

Authorities arrived at the scene of the attack right away to conduct a response and investigation. The injured were taken to the Civil Hospital in Zhob and treated there. According to reports, one of the injured people was in critical condition.

The suicide bomber's body was discovered at the explosion site, proving that they were responsible for the attack. To gather information and ascertain the precise nature of the attack, investigative teams arrived at the scene.

== Reactions ==
Following the incident, Prime Minister Shehbaz Sharif vehemently denounced the suicide attack and commanded the Balochistan government to launch a full investigation from all possible perspectives. The objective was to prosecute the attack's perpetrators. Other political figures, such as Balochistan Chief Minister Abdul Quddus Bizenjo, PPP Co-chairman Asif Ali Zardari, and Chairman of the Pakistan Tehreek-e-Insaf Imran Khan, denounced the attack and offered their condolences to the victims.
