= August 2023 Huwara shooting =

Terrorist incident in the West Bank

Huwara shooting attack (August 2023)
- Part of the Israeli–Palestinian conflict
- Location of Huwara, West Bank
- Native name: פיגוע הירי בחווארה (אוגוסט 2023)
- Location: Huwara, Israeli-occupied West Bank
- Date: 19 August 2023
- Target: Israelis
- Attack type: Mass shooting
- Weapon: M16 rifle
- Deaths: 2 victims
- Perpetrator: Hamas
- No. of participants: 1

The August 2023 Huwara shooting was a shooting attack carried out on August 19, 2023, by a Hamas militant south of the town of Huwara. In the attack, two Israelis, a father and his son, residents of Ashdod, were murdered.

== The attack ==
Two Israelis from Ashdod, Shai Sailas Nigrker, 60, and his son Aviv (Nigrker) Nir, 29, arrived in Huwara on Saturday, August 19, 2023, to service their car. After several hours of repairs, the two were at a car wash on Highway 60 south of Hawara. Around 3:04pm, a Palestinian militant arrived, shot them and ran away.

After the attack, the Palestine Red Crescent Society arrived to provide first aid to the victims who were critically wounded. A Magen David Adom team that arrived at the scene pronounced the two victims dead.

Hundreds of soldiers conducted searches to locate the perpetrator.

On August 26, a week after the attack, Hamas claimed responsibility.
