= 2023 Kabal explosions =

Explosions in Swat, Pakistan

- Location: Counter-Terrorism Department (CTD) building, Kabal Tehsil, Swat District, Pakistan
- Date: 24 April 2023
- Attack type: Explosion
- Weapon: Explosives
- Deaths: 17
- Injuries: Over 50
- Perpetrator: Unknown
- Motive: Unknown

On 24 April 2023, an explosion in the Counter-Terrorism Department building in Kabal, Swat Valley, Pakistan, killed at least 17 people and wounded more than 50 others. Although the origin of the explosion is still being looked into, it is assumed that either an ancient ammo store or the explosive material kept in the building's basement caught fire.

Although their role is unconfirmed, Tehreek-e-Jihad Pakistan (TJP) claimed responsibility for the attack a day later.

== Background ==
The Tehreek-e-Taliban Pakistan (TTP) has been implicated in a number of recent attacks against security personnel. Up until 2014, the TTP ruled over the Swat Valley and other regions of northwest Pakistan until significant degradation by the Pakistani military.

== Investigation ==
According to Sharifullah Khan, a police official in Kabal, the explosions were caused by a fire that started in the basement of the CTD building, where explosives were being kept. The authorities were looking into whether it was an attack, but provincial police chief Akhtar Hayat believes that old ammunition storage in the building may have caused the explosion. The explosion did not seem to be an act of terrorism, according to Sohail Khalid, the regional head of the counter-terrorism division, who spoke to Reuters. The Prime Minister Shehbaz Sharif has called for a probe.
