= 2023 Khyber Pakhtunkhwa oil and gas company attack =

- Date: November 7, 2023
- Location: Dera Ismail Khan, Khyber Pakhtunkhwa, Pakistan
- Type: Terrorist attack
- Perpetrator: Heavily armed militants
- Deaths: 2 policemen
- Injuries: 3 others

The 2023 Khyber Pakhtunkhwa oil and gas company attack occurred on November 7, 2023, when heavily armed militants attacked the Alhaj Oil and Gas Company in the Dera Ismail Khan district of Khyber Pakhtunkhwa, Pakistan. The attack resulted in the death of two policemen and injuries to three others.

== Background ==
The attack occurred shortly after a prior incident in the same province, where a Pakistan Army officer and three soldiers were killed during an intense exchange of fire with militants in the Tirah area.

== Attack ==
Heavily armed militants targeted the Alhaj Oil and Gas Company, situated in the Dera Ismail Khan district, which borders the South Waziristan tribal district. The attack took place late on Tuesday night and led to a violent shootout. Two policemen lost their lives during the attack, while three others sustained injuries.

== Response ==
In the aftermath of the attack, police contingents promptly arrived at the scene. A combing operation was launched in the area to capture the fleeing attackers. The injured victims were admitted to the district's Combined Military Hospital.

== See also ==
- Terrorism in Pakistan
- Khyber Pakhtunkhwa
