= 2023 Kandahari Bazar bombing =

Insurgent attack in Quetta, Pakistan

- Part of the insurgency in Balochistan
- Location: Shahrah-e-Iqbal area, Quetta, Balochistan, Pakistan
- Date: 10 April 2023
- Target: Police vehicle
- Attack type: Bombing
- Weapon: Motorcycle bomb
- Deaths: 4
- Injuries: 15+

On 10 April 2023, a bombing in Kandahari Bazar, Quetta, Balochistan, Pakistan killed four people.

== Background ==
Balochistan's largest city, Quetta, is often attacked by Baloch separatists and Islamists. Pakistan's largest urban areas, including Karachi and Peshawar, have experienced an increase in terrorist strikes in recent months that have targeted security officers. An extensive campaign to eradicate terrorism from the nation has been given the go by the National Security Committee (NSC). The Pakistan Institute of Peace Studies (PIPS) reports a 27% rise in terrorist attacks in Pakistan over the previous year, with at least 419 fatalities and 734 wounded in 262 incidents.

== Bombing ==
On 10 April 2023, a terrorist attack occurred in Kandahari Bazar, Quetta, Balochistan, Pakistan. The blast killed four people, including two police officers, and injured at least 15 others. The explosive material was installed in a motorcycle, and the blast damaged several cars and motorcycles in the area.

== Reactions ==
Prime minister Shehbaz Sharif denounced the incident and sent his sympathies to the victims' families. Also, he requested a report on the terror assault and gave the appropriate authorities instructions to offer medical care to those hurt in the explosion. Police have sealed off the area and are still looking into the explosion's cause. The attack emphasises the persistent menace of terrorism in Pakistan and the demand for all-encompassing solutions to address the issue and guarantee the wellbeing of the populace.

== See also ==
- Terrorist incidents in Pakistan in 2023
