= Mustafa Kamal Barki =

Pakistani Military Officer

Brigadier Mustafa Kamal Barki TBt
- Born: Kaniguram, North Western Frontier Province
- Died: 21 March 2023; Angoor Adda, South Waziristan
- Education: Cadet College Razmak; Pakistan Military Academy; National Defence University, Islamabad; Command and Staff College, Quetta
- Children: 4
- Military career
- Allegiance: Pakistan
- Branch: Pakistan Army
- Service years: 1995—2023
- Rank: Brigadier
- Unit: 3 Frontier Force Regiment
- Commands: Commander Counter Intelligence Hub (N); Adjutant Cadet College Razmak
- Conflicts: Kargil War (WIA); Operation Zarb-e-Azb; Insurgency in Khyber Pakhtunkhwa †
- Awards: Tamgha-e-Basalat

Brigadier Mustafa Kamal Barki (Note: Urdu: مصطفی کمال برکی; Also spelled as Mustafa Kamal Burki.) (died 21 March 2023) was a one-star General officer serving in the Inter-Services Intelligence (ISI), Pakistan Army. He was killed in action during an encounter with militants in South Waziristan. Barki was among the highest-ranking ISI officers to be killed in the line of duty.

== Early life ==
Born in Kaniguram into a Pashtun family of the Burki tribe, Mustafa was the eldest son of a schoolteacher. He received his early education from a local school before being accepted into a school in Tank. After the death of his parents, he took on the responsibility of raising his siblings.

== Personal life ==
Barki is survived by his widow and four children, one son and three daughters. At the time of his death, his twin daughters were eight years old.

Four of his close relatives also lost their lives in the line of duty.

== Military career ==
After completing his education at the Cadet College Razmak, Mustafa was selected by a medical college and the Pakistan Military Academy, but preferred the latter. He was commissioned into the 3 Frontier Force Regiment of the Pakistan Army on 12 October 1995. He was a graduate of the National Defence University, Islamabad and the Command and Staff College, Quetta.

During the Kargil War, he was wounded in action. Throughout his career, he has served in numerous counter terrorism operations which includes 2014 APS attack where he traced and neutralized the terrorists of Tehrik-i-Taliban Pakistan.

On 21 March 2023, he led an operation against terrorists in South Waziristan. While exchange of fire, Mustafa was shot and he was killed in action. During the operations, 7 soldiers were injured including 2 critical wounds.

Mustafa's death was condoled by former Prime Minister Imran Khan. Mustafa was buried with full military honours and his funeral was attended by the Chief of Army Staff, Chairman Joint Chiefs of Staff Committee, and Director-General of Inter-Services Intelligence. Other attendees included President of Pakistan Arif Alvi and Prime Minister Shehbaz Sharif.

Mustafa was posthumously awarded the Tamgha-e-Basalat for his valour.
