= Sambaza =

- City
- Location within Balochistan, Pakistan Location within Pakistan
- Coordinates: 31°46′27″N 69°20′56″E
- Country: Pakistan
- Territory: Balochistan
- Time zone: UTC+05:00 (PST)
- Postal code: 85201

Sambaza (Urdu: سمبازا) is a tehsil of Zhob District in the province of Balochistan, Pakistan. It is located in the northern part of Balochistan and forms part of the administrative structure of Zhob District. The population of Sambaza is predominantly Pashtun, with the Mandokhail Mandokhel tribe being one of the principal tribal groups residing in the area. The Mandokhail are a Pashtun tribe traditionally associated with Zhob and adjoining regions of northern Balochistan.
