= Daraban Tehsil =

Coordinates: 31°44′3″N 70°20′11″E

Daraban Tehsil تحصیل درابن درابن تحصیل
- Tehsil
- Interactive map of Daraban Tehsil
- Country: Pakistan
- Province: Khyber Pakhtunkhwa
- District: Dera Ismail Khan District

Government
  - Chairman: Humayun Khan Miankhel (PPP)

Population (2017)
  - Total: 123,933
- Time zone: UTC+5 (PST)

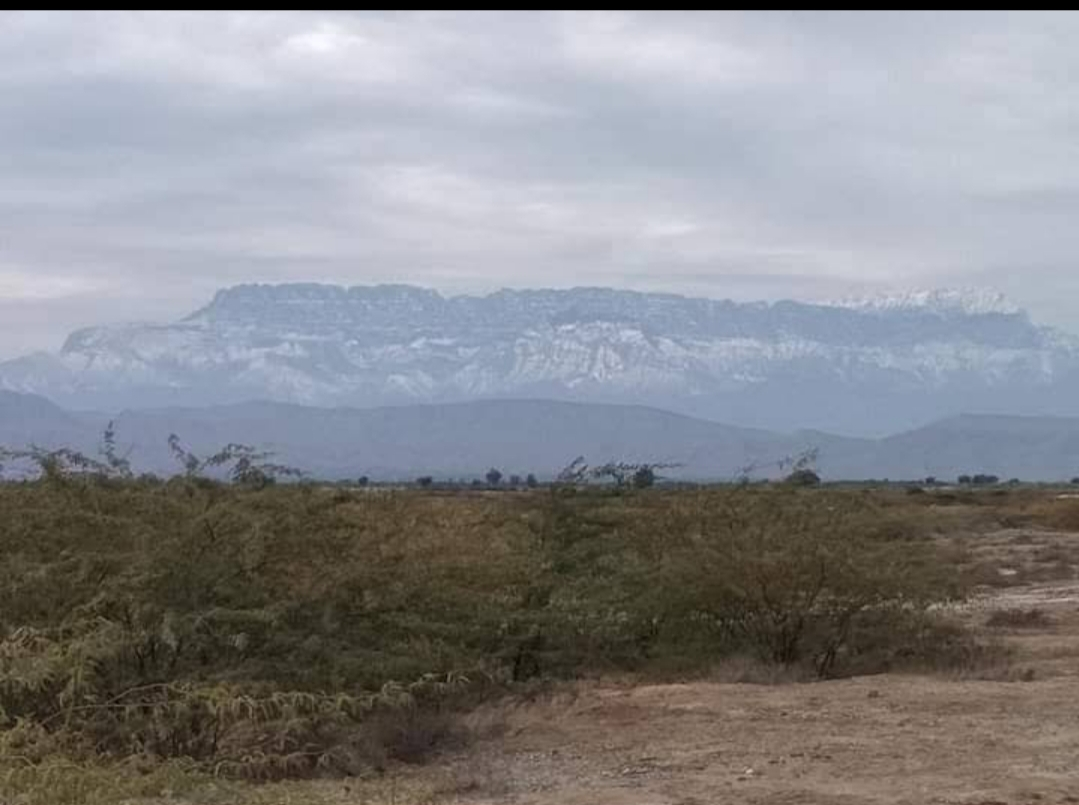
A view of Koh Sulaiman from Draban

Draban is a tehsil of Dera Ismail Khan District, Khyber Pakhtunkhwa, Pakistan. It is located at 31°44'3N 70°20'11E and has an altitude of 221 metres (725 ft). Draban is a small town which lies 40 miles (64 km) west of Dera Ismail Khan in the foothills of Sulaiman Mountains. Over the last two decades or so, Draban has seen massive growth, becoming a vibrant hub of local trade and business. This has led to influx of economic migrants from neighboring villages, who have begun to settle on the outskirts of Draban, causing an increase in the town's population. Draban enjoys excellent geographical condition; it lies on a major national highway connecting Khyber Pakhtunkhuwa and Punjab with eastern parts of Balochistan. The town's recent history includes events like high profile insurgent attack on Draban's police station which led to deaths of 23 security personnel. This was the only occasion when the town gained media attention in Pakistan and abroad. The 12 December 2023 attack, and a more recent one in Chaudwan on 5 February 2024, reflect heightened security threats in the region.

== Etymology ==
There are various opinions regarding the origin of the word Draban. The word "Daraban", or "Drabund" according to Herbert Benjamin Edwardes, (1819–1868) has its origins in phrase "Durruh-Bund", which meant, the closed pass. Herbert Benjamin Edwardes was a British Indian official who visited Dera Ismail Khan region in 1848-9. He wrote down detailed of current day Khyber-Pakhtunkhwa region and its people and their ways of life in his book A Year on the Punjab Frontier. According to Hebert Edwardes, the Miankhel Pashtoon tribe which settled down in present day Draban, aimed to close the pass which connected their region with Sherani hills. Sheranis and Miankhels had turbulent relationships. The phrase "Durruh_Bund" in evolved into Darabund and further into Drabund or Draban and began to mark out Miankhel tribe's territory. Hebert Edwardes uses the word Drábund while describing village of Draban in years 1848-9. In his book he writes, "Drábund is a small section of the Damán Proper, or skirts of the hills, not extending across the Dérajâtto the Indus. It lies south and south-west of the country of the Gundapoors, which we have just left. Its boundary with Koláchee on the north is the Nullah, or Stream of Zirkunnee, or Sawan; on the west, the outer ridge of the Tukht-i- Sooliman; on the south, with the Babhurs, a line of pillars laid down by me, equidistant between the two disputed courses of the Kowruh Nullah, or Bitter Stream. The Drábund country altogether is about twelve miles by twenty-one in extent; and in character generally resembles the neighbouring country of the Gundapoors; but Drábund is more undulated towards the hills, its villages are surrounded by more trees and vegetation, and on the whole, it wears a more cheerful and prosperous appearance".

Regarding origins of word Draban, another widely popular but less authentic version states the words Daraban and Darazinda, chief town of Drazinda District, originate in similar sound, are Persian in origin and related with Dara Shikoh, a son of Mughal emperor, Shajahan. There is little historical evidence in support of this claim, but still this origin myth lingers in popular imagination. The former account regarding the origin of the name of Draban looks more plausible and is very much attested by the early history of enmity and hostility between Sherani tribe and Miankhels.

== Early history and British arrival ==
It is unlikely that region of Draban including Darazinda, Musa Zai, Zarkani and Chodwan had, for so long, remained without human habitation in ancient times. This region's geographical location, rich agricultural produce and fertile soil for cultivation and water must have encouraged early human settlement. At approximately twenty kilometers from Daraban lies the site of Jhandi Babar, at 31°-37'N Latitude and 70°-30. Excavations carried out at this site reveals Bronze Age culture. This particular site was discovered by A. Steinin in 1927. Further excavations were carried out during 1970's by A.H. Dani, at Gumla and Hathala who was then chairman of the Department of Archaeology, University of Peshawar. He conducted further excavations and also discovered a few sites including that of Rehman Dheri. Likewise, Herbert B. Edwardes, in his book A Year on the Punjab Frontier in 1848 – 49: Volume 2 mentions Dhera, a huge mound near Loharaa river in Daraban. Herbert B. Edwardes was of the opinion this rain furrowed mound, called by the people "Dheyr", could be link in the chain of Græco-Bactrian outposts in this region.

Dera Ismail Khan region including Damaan remained part of Delhi Sultanet and as it grew weak during 16th century, it came under control of Langah dynasty. It was then Sultan Husayn of same dynasty who assigned the region around Dera Ismail Khan to Sardar Malik Sohrab Dodai in 1469 or 1471 and. Malik's son, Ismail Khan, is generally credited to have founded the city of Dera Ismail Khan. In 1541, Sher Shah Suri captured Multan, and region of Dera Ismail Khan passed into his hands. Under Great Mughals, this region became part of Multan Subah of Mughal empire. Dera Ismail Khan region lay on major Multan-to-Kandahar trade route, which passed through current day Draban, Kulachi and most importantly Zarkani. Through Zarkani pass trade caravans threaded their way across narrow defile and mountains of Gomal pass to enter India after crossing river Indus. Draban region was then, frequented by these Pashtoon nomadic traders, merchants and soldiers of fortune. Around 1750, the city of Dera Ismail Khan was captured by Ahmad Shah Durrani, becoming part of Durani Empire. In 1794, the city was granted to Nawab Muhammad Khan Sadozai by Shahzada Kamran Durrani. Dera city was annexed by the British in 1849 following their conquest of Punjab. By 1850, Draban region was in British hands.

== Modern history ==
- Daraban police station attack

== Languages, ethnicity and culture ==
The region of Draban is home to Pashtuns and Saraiki-speaking Baloch and Jat people. In Draban, both Saraiki and Pashto are spoken. Both Pashtuns and Saraikis are bilingual and fluently speak Pashto and Saraiki. It is only Nasir, nomadic Pashtoon tribe which speaks only Pashto. Centuries of close interaction of Pashto with Saraiki has given the former language a unique Saraiki touch. And Saraiki has under the influence of Pasthto acquired a unique flavour of its own.There has been a lot mutual borrowing of words and for same reasons Saraiki language in Kulachi and Tank and Draban has a special and peculiar accent which sets it apart from Saraiki spoken in Dera city, Bhakhar and Darya Khan. Majority of Pashtuns in Draban and Musa Zai come from Miankhel tribe, but apart from them, Bakhtiars, Sherwani, Nasir, Gandapoor and Marwat also live in Daraban in considerable number. Majority of Saraiki speakers in Daraban region are of non Baloch origin, though many Saraiki speakers of Baloch ancestry also live in Draban and in nearby areas and they also speak Baloch language.

== Geographic location and communication ==
Draban lies at the foot of the Sulaiman Mountains. The peaks of Takht-e-Sulaiman, which can be seen from Draban, are a part of myth and folklore of the people who live in whole of Damaan.To the plains of Damaan, the sulaiman range and twin peaks of Takhte sulaiman give a picturesque background. Daraban enjoys privileged geographic position in the whole of neighbouring region and this accounts for its burgeoning trade and nomadic Pashtun population. The town is connected by road with neighbouring towns of Darazinda, Musazai, Chaudwan. Draban also lies on the national highway connecting Khyber-Pakhtunkhwa and Punjab with Baluchistan. The highway which was built by the National Highway authority plays vital role in the development and progress of this region. Traveling to Zhob and Quetta from Khyber-Pakhtunkhwa was quite difficult before the construction of this highway.Travelers had to suffer a long ordeal in travelling to Zhob and Eastern Balochistan through narrow, hazardous road through Sherani country or via a longer road across South Waziristan. The highway has also resulted in increase of trade and commerce in Draban and areas around it. The area near the Sulaiman Mountains is mainly inhabited by nomadic Pashtun tribes to its north and central side and Baloch tribes on its southern side. Both the Pashto and Balochi languages are spoken in the villages located at the foothills of the mountains.

== Educational institutions ==
In terms of literacy rate and educational standards, Draban and its bordering areas lagged behind Kulachi and the rest of Dera Ismail khan. In Draban, government high school was established in 1953, but it was upgraded to the status of higher secondary school around year 2000. As a matter of fact, Musa Zai excelled Draban in terms of educational achievement. Musa Zai's rich landowning class had sufficient resources and money to have their young generation educated in cities. But then around year 2000 Draban experienced a Renaissance in field of education. A degree college was established in Draban, few years ago, by the provincial government.

== Places of interest ==
The town of Draban itself offers little in terms of sightseeing, entertainment or adventure. So it is neighbouring Sulaiman Range mountains where mostly people end up in their quest for enjoyment, recreation and fun. Daraban Zam is at ten minutes drive from Draban town and is quite popular among young people because of its flowing waters and mountain scenery. Near Darazinda, Peer Ghundai, is also a sight of abundant waterfalls and majestic scenery..

In addition, Ragha Sir, Khaisrai, Sado Pawa, Tanga, Karahi, Almar kalan, Mughal Kot, Dana Sir, Shambai Zandr, are places where temperature is moderate and mountains are green and beautiful. But it is a trip to Takht-e-Sulaiman which is most popular among people of Damaan. The trip to this 3400m high summit is undertaken in summer and usually takes two days journey on foot over difficult mountain terrain. On the summit, there is a religious shrine and a Takht related with prophet Sulaiman. To the south of Daraban lies the town of Musa Zai Sharif boasting an important Khankah of Nashbaniah Sufi tradition. The shrine houses tombs of Dost Muhammad Qandhari, Usman Damani, Sirjuddin, Ibrahim, Ismail. The Khankah of Musa Zai Shareef is well-known and devotees flock to it from all over Pakistan, Afghanistan and even from abroad. Khankah of Shaikh Ghulam Yaseen Sahib, known as Agah Sahib and tombs of his sons Faiz Muhammad Sahib, Muhammad Din Sahib are also in Musa Zai.
