= 2023 Muslim Bagh attack =

Mass shooting in Balochistan, Pakistan

2023 Muslim Bagh Attack
- Part of the insurgency in Balochistan
- Location: Muslim Bagh, Killa Saifullah District, Balochistan, Pakistan
- Date: 12 May 2023; Early hours
- Target: Frontier Corps camp
- Attack type: Mass shooting
- Deaths: 13 (including the perpetrators)
- Injuries: 12
- Assailants: 6

On 12 May 2023, a terrorist attack occurred in Muslim Bagh, Killa Saifullah District in northern Balochistan, Pakistan. Insurgents attacked a Frontier Corps camp, killing six security officers and a civilian. The insurgent group Tehreek-e-Jihad Pakistan (TJP) claimed responsibility for the attack.

== Attack ==
Well-armed militants invaded the Frontier Corps camp in Muslim Bagh early on 12 May 2023. Security officers moved quickly to organize a rescue mission for the hostages and to clear the area. Six troops and a civilian also perished in addition to the six assailants. Six other people, including a woman, suffered injuries.

== Reactions ==
The military's media branch, Inter-Services Public Relations (ISPR), denounced the assault and reaffirmed the dedication of security forces to preserving calm and stability in Balochistan. The attackers' immediate threat was removed by a successful clearance operation by the ISPR. The ISPR vowed to keep up intelligence work to identify the sponsors of the terrorists, find their enablers, and track down their links.

Prime minister Shehbaz Sharif expressed his profound sadness and grief over the deaths of the soldiers and civilians. He reaffirmed the nation's support for the security forces and ordered that the injured be given the finest medical care available.
