= Dhana Sar =

- Location within Pakistan
- Coordinates: 31.25°N 69.59°E
- Country: Pakistan
- Province: Balochistan
- Elevation: 1,205 m (3,953 ft)
- Time zone: UTC+5 (PST)

Dhana Sar is a town located in Balochistan, Pakistan. It lies about 35 km from Zhob and 130 km from Dera Ismail Khan. To the west of Dhana Sar stands Nar Ghar (9100 feet) and towards South is Mizri Ghar (10207 feet). Karher River passes close to Dhana Sar.

Sherani Pakhtuns inhabit Dhana Sar.
