= Daraban police station attack =

2023 terrorist mass murder in Pakistan

- Part of the insurgency in Khyber Pakhtunkhwa
- Location: 31°43′58″N 70°19′54″E; Dera Ismail Khan District, Khyber Pakhtunkhwa, Pakistan
- Date: 12 December 2023
- Target: Khyber Pakhtunkhwa Police; Pakistan Army
- Attack type: Vehicle-ramming, suicide bombing, mass shooting
- Weapons: Car bomb, guns
- Deaths: 24 (including a perpetrator)
- Injuries: 34
- Perpetrator: Tehreek-e-Jihad Pakistan

On 12 December 2023, the Deobandi jihadist insurgent group Tehreek-e-Jihad Pakistan attacked a police station in Daraban, Dera Ismail Khan District, Khyber Pakhtunkhwa, Pakistan, killing at least 23 people.

== Background ==
The insurgency in northwestern Pakistan began in 2004. Since the Pakistani Taliban's formation in 2007 it is led by them. After the insurgency's intensity peaked in the late 2000s and early 2010s, it slowed to a low-intensity conflict in 2017. It escalated during the early 2020s. During early 2023, Tehreek-e-Jihad Pakistan was founded and joined the insurgency. Pakistan says that it is merely another name for the Pakistani Taliban and that high proportion of terrorist attacks in Pakistan are carried out by Afghans. Pakistan's government accuses the Pakistani Taliban's Afghan ally, the Taliban, who govern Afghanistan, of allowing the Pakistani Taliban to use Afghanistan as a base to carry out attacks in Pakistan. In response to the large number of attacks by Afghans – including the 2022 Peshawar mosque attack by Islamic State – Khorasan Province – the Pakistani government are deporting large numbers of illegal immigrants, the vast majority of whom are Afghans.

== Attack ==
On 12 December 2023, Tehreek-e-Jihad Pakistan insurgents carried out an attack on a police station in Daraban, Dera Ismail Khan District, Khyber Pakhtunkhwa, Pakistan. The vehicle-ramming, suicide bombing and mass shooting attack killed at least 23 people and wounded 34 others. The Pakistan Army had been using the police station as a base camp.

== Perpetrators ==
Tehreek-e-Jihad Pakistan claimed responsibility for the attack. Its spokesman Mohammed Qasim stated, "Our suicide bombers attacked a military compound at 2:30 a.m. and started killing soldiers one by one. An army camp is set up in a school. More than 20 soldiers were killed in the attack". The government of Pakistan says that Tehreek-e-Jihad is a part of the Tehreek-i-Taliban Pakistan, and that "Tehreek-e-Jihad" is simply another name for the Tehreek-i-Taliban Pakistan.

== Response ==
The Inter-Services Public Relations, the media wing for the Pakistan Armed Forces, has stated that the Pakistan Army killed 27 militants in response, and has stated that all 6 militants involved in the attack were killed. In a statement, the prime minister of Pakistan Anwaar ul Haq Kakar said, "The whole nation pays homage to the sacrifices of the martyrs in the fight against terrorism, such coward attacks could not demoralize our forces."

=== Accusations of Afghan involvement ===
Pakistan has repeatedly said that militant attacks against Pakistan are being conducted by Afghans. Afghanistan says that is not the case. On 12 December, Pakistan's Ministry of Foreign Affairs summoned a representative for the government of Afghanistan in relation to this. It asked the Afghan government to "fully investigate and take stern action against perpetrators" and to "publicly condemn the terrorist incident at the highest level."

== See also ==
- List of terrorist incidents in 2023
- Terrorist incidents in Pakistan in 2023
