= 2023 Barkhan bombing =

Terrorist attack in Pakistan

Rakhni market bombing
- Part of Insurgency in Balochistan
- Location: Rakhni market, Barkhan district, Balochistan, Pakistan
- Date: 26 February 2023
- Target: Civilians
- Attack type: Bombing
- Deaths: At least 4
- Injuries: 14
- Perpetrator: Unknown

On 26 February 2023, an explosion occurred in the Rakhni market of Barkhan district, Balochistan, killing at least four people and injuring 14 others.

== Background ==
The blast was caused by an IED planted on a motorcycle and detonated remotely. Videos of the aftermath were circulated on social media, but no group has claimed responsibility for the attack. The incident follows a series of attacks in KP and areas bordering Afghanistan by the Tehrik-i-Taliban Pakistan, which has intensified its activities since talks broke down in November 2022.

Pakistani officials, including the Balochistan Chief Minister and the Interior Minister, have condemned the attack and called for greater action against terrorist groups.
