= 2023 Karachi police station attack =

Mass murder in Sindh by Pakistani Taliban

2023 Karachi Police Office attack
- Location: Karachi Police Office, Karachi, Sindh, Pakistan
- Date: 17 February 2023
- Weapons: guns, grenades
- Deaths: 4
- Injuries: 14
- Perpetrator: Pakistani Taliban (TTP)
- No. of participants: 3
- Defenders: Pakistan Rangers, Special Security Unit (SSU)

The 2023 Karachi Police Station Attack occurred on 17 February 2023, when Islamist insurgents stormed the heavily guarded Karachi Police Office (KPO) located at the heart of the provincial metropolis of Karachi, Sindh, Pakistan. The attackers used guns and grenades to kill four people (two policemen, a ranger, and a civilian) and injured 14 others.

The Pakistani Taliban (TTP), claimed responsibility for the attack. The siege was brought to an end on the same day, with Sindh Chief Minister Murad Ali Shah later stating that the three militants responsible for the attack had been killed.

The attack on the KPO was seen as a major security lapse which raised several questions and need for proper course of action to be taken. This prompted the security administration and the provincial government to carry out a ‘security audit’ of critical government infrastructure.

Prime Minister Shehbaz Sharif condemned the attack and emphasized that the terrorists may have forgotten that Pakistan is a nation that defeated terrorism with its bravery and courage.

In 2024, Umer Farooq, a Tehreek-e-Taliban Pakistan militant involved in the attack was killed in an intelligence-based operation in Karachi.
