= 2023 North Waziristan suicide bombing =

Insurgent attack in Pakistan

- Location: North Waziristan, Khyber Pakhtunkhwa, Pakistan
- Date: 24 May 2023
- Target: Security checkpoint
- Attack type: Suicide bombing
- Weapon: Explosives
- Deaths: 4
- Injuries: Several
- Perpetrator: Jaish Fursan Mohammed
- No. of participants: 1

On 24 May 2023, a security checkpoint was attacked by a suicide bomber in North Waziristan, Pakistan. Four people were killed in the attack, and numerous others were injured. It was believed by some that the Pakistani Taliban (TTP) were responsible following them taking credit for an attack on an oil and gas plant in the Hangu District the day before, which resulted in the deaths of four security personnel and two private guards. Four days later, the militant group Jaish Fursan Mohammed claimed responsibility for the attack.

The media branch of the Pakistani Military, Inter-Services Public Relations (ISPR), confirmed the deaths of two soldiers, Naik Said Ullah Shah and Sepoy Jawad Khan, Police Constable Hakeem Jan, and an unarmed civilian.

== See also ==
- 2023 North Waziristan terrorist attack - August 2023 attack by the Islamic State
