= 2023 Bolan suicide bombing =

2023 terror attack in Pakistan

Bolan terrorist attack
- Part of the War in North-West Pakistan
- Location: Bolan, Balochistan province, Pakistan
- Date: 6 March 2023
- Target: Police officers
- Attack type: Suicide bombing
- Weapon: Motorcycle bomb
- Deaths: 9
- Injuries: 13
- Perpetrator: Islamic State – Pakistan Province

On 6 March 2023, a terrorist attack occurred in Bolan, Balochistan province, Pakistan. The attack targeted a van carrying police officers from Sibi back to the provincial capital Quetta, killing at least nine personnel and injuring 13. The attacker, believed to be a suicide bomber riding a motorcycle, rammed into the police van on the Kambri bridge between Sibi and Kachhi districts. A newly formed Islamist militant group, Tehreek-e-Jihad Pakistan, and the Islamic State (which provided a photo of the attacker) claimed responsibility for the attack.

The injured were transported to Sibi Civil Hospital. Bomb disposal squads and security personnel arrived at the site, closing the area off and beginning a search operation. The Balochistan Information Department stated that the injured officers had been transported to Quetta from Bolan via a government helicopter.

Balochistan Chief Minister Abdul Qudoos Bizenjo condemned the attack, vowing to foil, with the public's support, all conspiracies to create unrest and instability in the province.

Prime Minister Shehbaz Sharif also condemned the incident, promising to rid the country of the menace of terrorism.
