= 2023 North Waziristan landmine attack =

Terrorist incident in Pakistan

2023 North Waziristan terrorist attack
- Part of insurgency in Khyber Pakhtunkhwa
- Location: Shawwal tehsil, North Waziristan, Pakistan
- Date: 19 August 2023
- Target: Laborers
- Attack type: Bombing
- Weapon: Land Mine
- Deaths: 11
- Injuries: 2
- Perpetrator: Islamic State

On 19 August 2023, a terrorist attack in the Gulmir Kot vicinity of North Waziristan, Pakistan, resulted in the death of 11 workers and injured two others. The explosion occurred when a vehicle transporting the laborers made contact with a concealed landmine. The wounded and the deceased were promptly transported to a nearby medical facility.

== Background ==
This attack follows closely after a significant suicide explosion in Bajaur, where a minimum of 63 individuals, including 23 children, died, and over 200 others were wounded. The Islamic State took credit for the explosion.

== Reactions ==
Caretaker Prime Minister Anwaar ul Haq vehemently denounced the incident, offering his heartfelt support to the afflicted families. Through a tweet, he conveyed his profound sorrow upon learning of the terrorist assault in North Waziristan.

== See also ==
- 2023 North Waziristan suicide bombing
