= Zhob District =

Coordinates: 31°10′N 68°50′E

Zhob District ږوب ولسوالۍ
- District of Balochistan
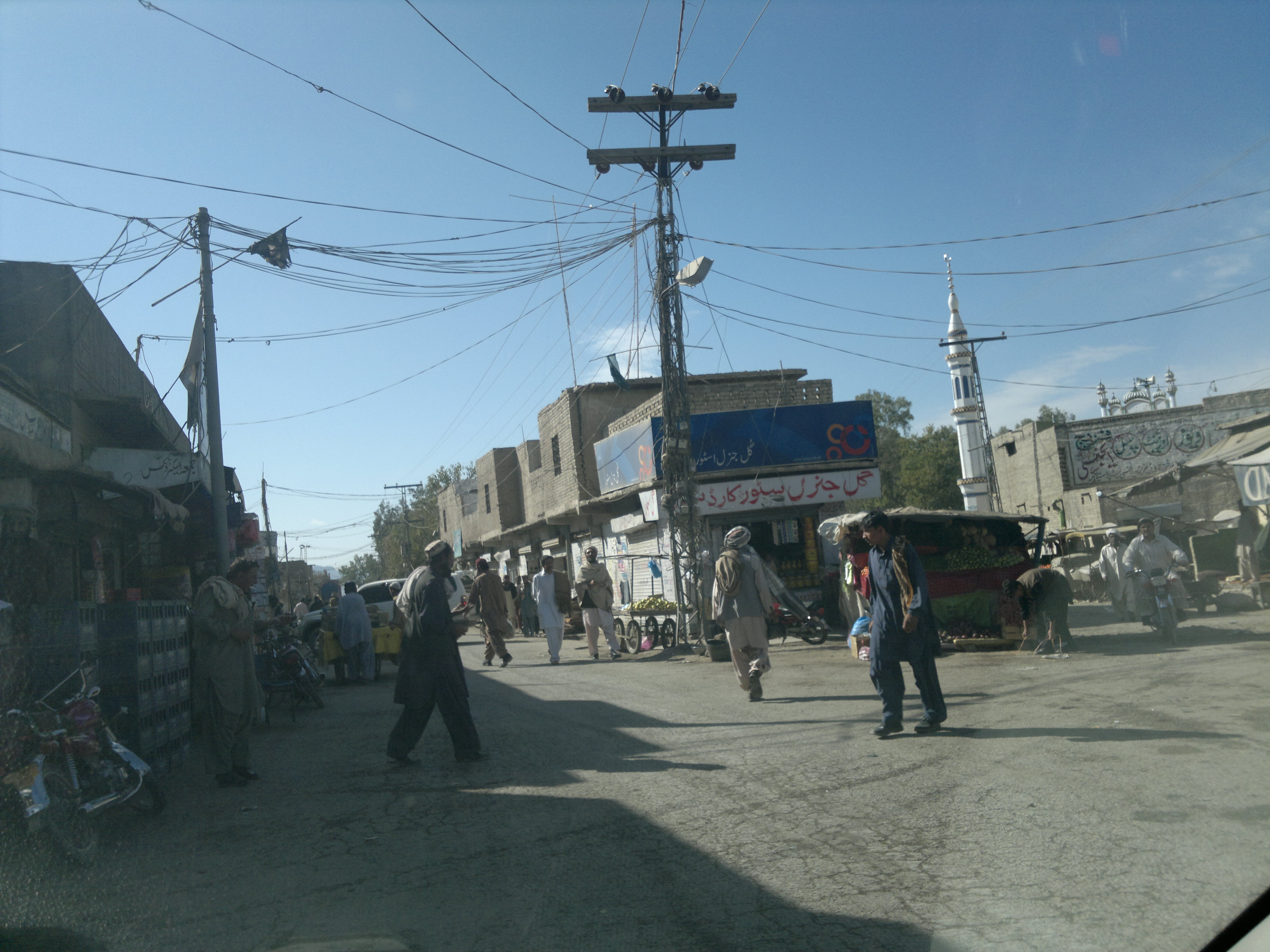
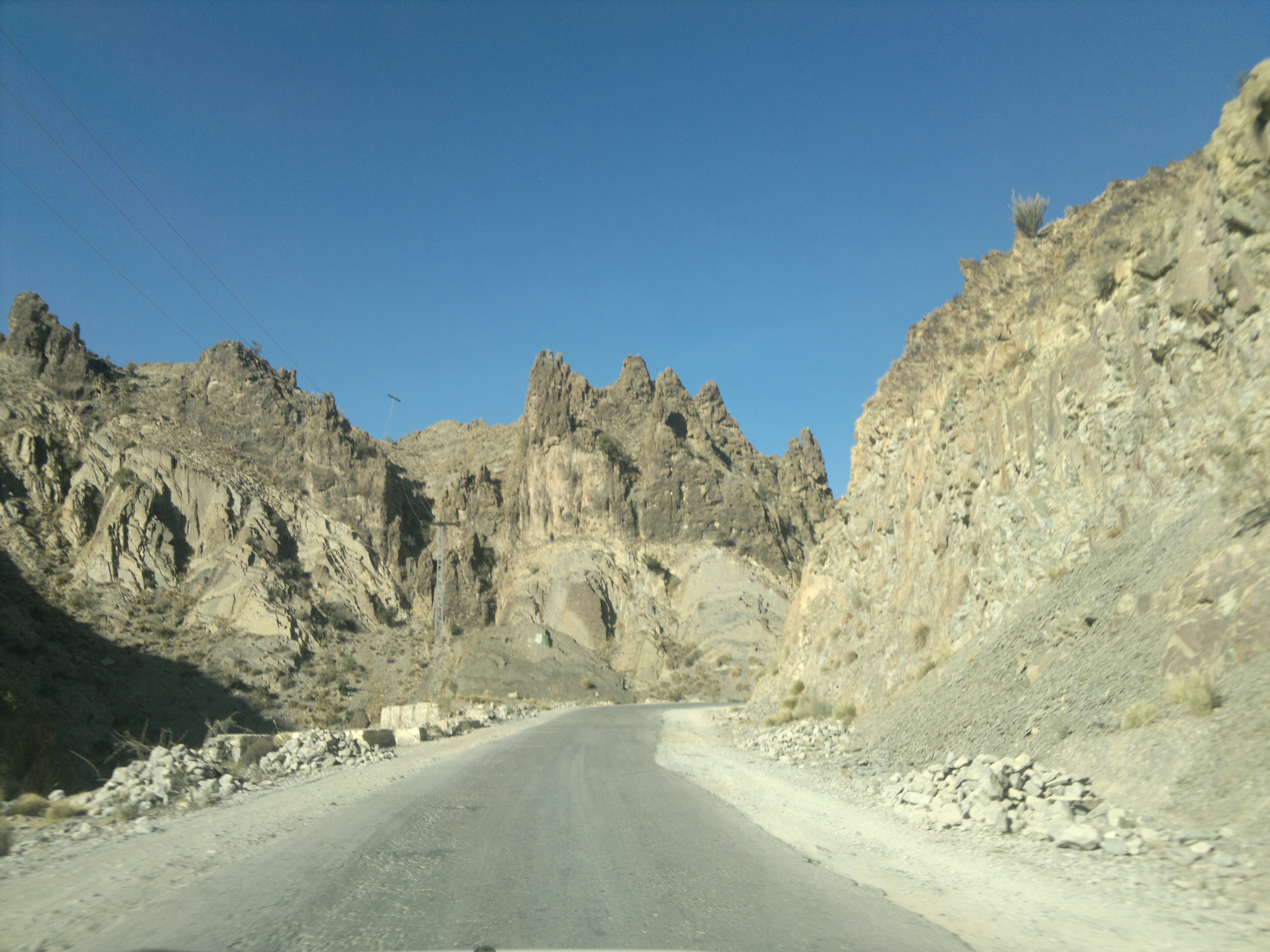
- Top: Zhob Bazaar; Bottom: Mountains near Zhob

- Map of Balochistan with Zhob District highlighted
- Country: Pakistan
- Province: Balochistan
- Division: Zhob
- Headquarters: Zhob

Government
  - Type: District Administration
  - Deputy Commissioner: N/A
  - District Police Officer: N/A
  - District Health Officer: N/A

Area
  - District of Balochistan: 15,987 km^{2} (6,173 sq mi)

Population (2023)
  - District of Balochistan: 355,692
  - Density: 22.249/km^{2} (57.624/sq mi)
  - Urban: 46,976
  - Rural: 308,716

Literacy
  - Literacy rate: Total: (36.62%); Male: (45.24%); Female: (26.81%)
- Time zone: PKT
- Number of Tehsils: 5

Zhob District (Pashto: ږوب ولسوالۍ) is a district in the northwestern part of Balochistan province of Pakistan. The population of Zhob District was estimated at 355,692 in 2023.

== Administration ==
The 1998 census report lists two sub-divisions: Lower Zhob (comprising Zhob tehsil and Sambaza sub-tehsil) and Kakar Khurasan (encompassing the tehsil of Qamar Din Karez and the subtehsil of Ashewat). A government webpage lists these as Ashwat, Qamar Din Karez, Sambaza and Zhob, without indicating if any of them are sub-tehsils.

Tehsil	Area (km²)	Pop. (2023)	Density (ppl/km²) (2023)	Literacy rate (2023)	Union Councils
Qamar Din Karez Tehsil	...	...	...	...	...
Zhob Tehsil	9,322	284,620	30.53	41.27%	...
Ashwat Tehsil	901	25,094	27.85	14.51%	...
Kashatu Tehsil	1,590	5,810	3.65	9.64%	...
Sambaza Tehsil	2,888	25,150	8.71	21.65%	...

== Demographics ==
Historical population
Year	Pop.	±% p.a.
1961	39,755	—
1972	74,519	+5.88%
1981	134,660	+6.80%
1998	193,458	+2.15%
2017	310,354	+2.52%
2023	355,692	+2.30%

Religions in Zhob district (2023)
Religion	Percent
Islam	99.51%
Christianity	0.41%
Other or not stated	0.08%

As of the 2023 census, Zhob district has 47,901 households and a population of 355,692. The district has a sex ratio of 117.57 males to 100 females and a literacy rate of 36.62%: 45.24% for males and 26.81% for females. 159,100 (44.75% of the surveyed population) are under 10 years of age. 46,976 (13.21%) live in urban areas. 1,732 (0.49% of the surveyed population) are religious minorities, mainly Christians and some Hindus.

Languages of Zhob district (2023)
1. Pashto (97.7%)
2. Saraiki (1.49%)
3. Others (0.86%)

At the time of the 2023 census, 97.65% of the population spoke Pashto and 1.49% Saraiki as their first language.

The majority of the population of Zhob district is Pashtun. A large number of IDPs were settled within the confines of the district as part of the evacuation from Operation Zarb-e-Azb that took place to the north of Zhob.

Religious groups in Zhob District (British Baluchistan era)
Religious group	1901		1911		1921		1931		1941	
Religious group	Pop.	%	Pop.	%	Pop.	%	Pop.	%	Pop.	%
Islam	99,599	96.3%	68,088	96.76%	52,302	92.3%	53,844	92.89%	55,987	91.04%
Hinduism	3,086	2.98%	1,391	1.98%	3,398	6%	2,839	4.9%	4,286	6.97%
Sikhism	610	0.59%	715	1.02%	826	1.46%	1,134	1.96%	1,076	1.75%
Christianity	133	0.13%	168	0.24%	141	0.25%	115	0.2%	146	0.24%
Judaism	1	0%	1	0%	0	0%	0	0%	0	0%
Jainism	0	0%	1	0%	0	0%	0	0%	0	0%
Zoroastrianism	0	0%	0	0%	0	0%	0	0%	1	0%
Buddhism	—N/a	—N/a	2	0%	1	0%	27	0.05%	0	0%
Tribal	—N/a	—N/a	—N/a	—N/a	—N/a	—N/a	0	0%	3	0%
Others	0	0%	0	0%	0	0%	4	0.01%	0	0%
Total population	103,429	100%	70,366	100%	56,668	100%	57,963	100%	61,499	100%
Note: British Baluchistan era district borders are not an exact match in the present-day due to various bifurcations to district borders — which since created new districts — throughout the region during the post-independence era that have taken into account population increases.

== See also ==
- Tehsils of Pakistan
  - Tehsils of Balochistan
  - Tehsils of Punjab, Pakistan
  - Tehsils of Khyber Pakhtunkhwa, Pakistan
  - Tehsils of Sindh, Pakistan
  - Tehsils of Azad Kashmir
  - Tehsils of Gilgit-Baltistan

== Bibliography ==
- 1998 District Census report of Zhob. Census publication. Vol. 107. Islamabad: Population Census Organization, Statistics Division, Government of Pakistan. 2000.
