= 2022 in Pakistan =

- Decades: 2000s; 2010s; 2020s
- See also: History of Pakistan; List of years in Pakistan; Timeline of Pakistani history

Events of the year 2022 in Pakistan.

== Incumbents ==
=== National government ===
Photo	Post	Name
	President of Pakistan	Arif Alvi
	Prime Minister of Pakistan	Shehbaz Sharif
	Chief Justice of Pakistan	Umar Ata Bandial
	Chairman of the Senate	Sadiq Sanjrani
	Chief Election Commissioner of Pakistan	Sikandar Sultan Raja
	Chairman Joint Chiefs of Staff Committee	Sahir Shamshad Mirza
	National Assembly	15th National Assembly

=== Provincial governments ===
Province	Governor	Chief Minister	Party	Government Type	Chief Justice
Balochistan	Mir Jan Muhammad Khan Jamali (Acting)	Abdul Quddus Bizenjo	BAP	Coalition	Naeem Akhtar (Balochistan High Court)
Gilgit-Baltistan	Syed Mehdi Shah	Khalid Khurshid	PTI	Majority	Muhammad Ajmal Gondal
Khyber Pakhtunkhwa	Haji Ghulam Ali	Azam khan(interim)	Qaiser Rashid Khan (Peshawar High Court)		
Punjab	Muhammad Baligh Ur Rehman	mohsin naqvi(interim)	Muhammad Ameer Bhatti (Lahore High Court)		
Sindh	Kamran Tessori	Syed Murad Ali Shah	PPP	Majority	Ahmed Ali Sheikh (Sindh High Court)

== Events ==
=== January ===
- 8 January – 2022 Murree snowstorm kills 23 domestic tourists.
- 20 January – 2022 Lahore bombing near Anarkali Bazaar kills at least 3 people and injures 20+.
- 20-23 January - 2022 Pakistan landslides
- 25 January – 2022 Kech District attack
- 26 January – 2022 Karachi protests
- 27 January – 27 February: 2022 Pakistan Super League commences with Karachi Kings v Multan Sultans.

=== February ===
- 2 February
  - Lumpy skin disease outbreak in Karachi
  - 2022 Panjgur and Naushki raids
- 4 February – Pakistan at the 2022 Winter Olympics
- 12 February – Lynching of Mushtaq Ahmed
- 27 February
  - Huqooq-e-Sindh March
  - PPP long march

=== March ===
- 1 March – 2022 heat wave in India and Pakistan
- 2 March
  - 2021–22 Pakistan Cup
  - March 2022 Quetta bombing
- 3 March – 2022 Sibi suicide bombing
- 4 March
  - Australian cricket team in Pakistan in 2021–22
  - 2022 Peshawar mosque attack
- 8 March – No-confidence motion against Imran Khan
- 9 March – Mian Channu incident
- 10 March – Parliament Lodges operation
- 11 March – 14 March: Pashtun National Jirga
- 15 March – 2022 Sibi IED explosion
- 18 March – Protesters storming Sindh House
- 22 March – 23 March: 48th Foreign Ministers conference
- 27 March – Imran Khan rally in Islamabad
- 29 March – 2022 MONUSCO helicopter crash 6 Pakistani UN Peacekeeping soldiers killed in Democratic Republic of Congo

=== April ===
- 3 April – 2022 Pakistani constitutional crisis
- 10 April – Imran Khan is removed from the post of Prime Minister of Pakistan through a no-confidence motion, adopted by the majority of the parliament.
- 11 April – Shehbaz Sharif is sworn-in as the Prime Minister of Pakistan.
- 18 April – Dadu village fire
- 26 April – 2022 University of Karachi bombing

=== May ===
- 13 May – 2022 Cholistan water crisis
- 16 May – 2022 Haripur wildfire
- 18 May – Sherani District wildfire
- 19 May – 2022 Pakistan economic crisis
- 24 May – Sri Lanka women's cricket team in Pakistan in 2022
- 25 May – 2022 Azadi march
- 29 May – 2022 Balochistan local government elections

=== June ===
- 1 June – Federal Shariah Court verdict on interest system in Pakistan
- 4 June – Shangla District wildfire
- 8 June
  - West Indian cricket team in Pakistan in 2022
  - Killa Saifullah bus crash
- 10 June – 2022-2023 Pakistan federal budget
- 12 June – 2022 Karachi fire
- 14 June – October - 2022 Pakistan floods
- 17 June – Pakistan at the 2022 World Aquatics Championships
- 21 June – June 2022 Afghanistan earthquake
- 26 June – 2022 Sindh local government elections

=== July ===
- 7 July – Pakistan at the 2022 World Games
- 12 July – 2022 Sindhi–Afghan strife
- 15 July – Pakistan at the 2022 World Athletics Championships
- 17 July – 2022 Punjab provincial by-election
- 18 July – Sadiqabad boat sinking
- 28 July – Pakistan at the 2022 Commonwealth Games

=== August ===
- 1 August –
  - 2022 Pakistan Army helicopter incident
  - The 2022 Census of Pakistan
- 2 August – The Election Commission of Pakistan announced verdict of PTI foreign funding case.
- 9 August – Pakistan at the 2021 Islamic Solidarity Games
- 13 August – 2022 Kashmir Premier League
- 14 August
  - Celebrations of Pakistan platinum (75th) Independence Day.
  - 2021–22 Pakistan Premier League
- 28 August –
  - Pakistan at the 2022 Asia Cup
  - 2022 Karachi local elections
- 30 August – 2022–23 National T20 Cup

=== September ===
- 13 September – 2022 Swat blast
- 20 September – English cricket team in Pakistan in 2022–23
- 24 September – Pakistani audio leaks controversy
- 27 September – 2022–23 Quaid-e-Azam Trophy

=== October ===
- 6 October – 2022 Pakistan Junior League
- 9 October – The Centaurus mall fire
- 10 October – 2022 Swat school van attack
- 13 October – Abandoned bodies incident in Nishtar Hospital
- 14 October – Pakistan won the New Zealand Tri-Nation Series.
- 16 October – 2022 Pakistan by-elections
- 28 October – 2022 Azadi March-II
- 28 October – Machar colony incident

=== November ===
- 3 November - Attempted assassination of Imran Khan
- 4 November - Ireland women's cricket team in Pakistan in 2022–23
- 6 November - 2022 Ghotki attack
- 16 November - 2022 Lakki Marwat attack
- 27 November - 2022 AJK local government elections
- 30 November - November 2022 Quetta bombing

=== December ===
- 10 December - 2022–23 Pakistan Cup
- 23 December - 2022 Islamabad suicide attack
- 26 December - New Zealand cricket team in Pakistan in 2022–23 (December 2022)
- 31 December - 2022 Islamabad local government elections

== Arts ==
=== Television ===
- 2022 in Pakistani television

== Economy ==
- 2021–22 Pakistan federal budget
- 2022–23 Pakistan federal budget

== Deaths ==
=== January-March ===
- 17 January - Rasheed Naz, television actor (b. 1948)
- 18 February - Athar Mateen, producer of Samaa TV
- 23 February - Rehman Malik, politician
- 27 February - Mahmood Ashraf Usmani, Islamic scholar, jurist and an author

=== April-June ===
- 15 April - Bilquis Edhi
- 7 May - Sardar Ali Haqqani, Islamic scholar
- 9 June - Aamir Liaquat Hussain, politician

=== July-September ===
- 13 July - Tanveer Jamal
- 1 August Lt Gen. Sarfraz Ali, Corps Commander 12 Corps
- 20 August - Nayyara Noor, playback singer
- 29 August - Manzoor Hussain (field hockey)

=== October-December ===
- 23 October - Arshad Sharif, journalist
- 19 December – Ali Ahmed Aslam, Pakistani-Scottish chef and restaurateur, credited with inventing chicken tikka masala, septic shock and organ failure (b. 1945).

== See also ==
=== Country overviews ===
- Pakistan
- Economy of Pakistan
- Government of Pakistan
- History of Pakistan
- History of modern Pakistan
- Outline of Pakistan
- Politics of Pakistan
- Terrorist incidents in Pakistan in 2022
- Years in Pakistan

=== Related timelines for current period ===
- 2022
- 2022 in politics and government
- 2020s
- 21st century
