= Terrorist incidents in Pakistan in 2022 =

Terrorist incidents in Pakistan in 2022 include:

== January–March ==
- 8 January - Three people were killed and three others injured in an attack on the brother of former caretaker Chief Minister Nawab Ghous Bakhsh Barozai in the Loni Road area in Sibi Balochistan.
- 17 January - One policeman was killed and three policemen were injured in a shootout in G-8 Islamabad. Two terrorists were also killed in the shootout.
- 20 January - 2022 Lahore bombing
- 25 January - 2022 Kech District attack
- 2 February - 2022 Panjgur and Naushki raids
- 2 March - March 2022 Quetta bombing
- 3 March - 2022 Sibi suicide bombing
- 4 March - 2022 Peshawar mosque attack
- 15 March - On 15 March 2022, an improvised explosive device exploded near a convoy of security forces in the village of Sangan, Sibi District in Balochistan, Pakistan, killing four Frontier Corps personnel and seriously injuring six others.

== April–June ==
- 26 April - 2022 University of Karachi bombing
- 12 May - 2022 Karachi Saddar bombing
- 15 May - 2022 Miranshah suicide bombing
- 16 May - 2022 Karachi Bolton Market bombing
- 19 May - One person was killed and several were injured in a bomb blast in Quetta.

== July–September ==
- 13 September - 2022 Swat blast
- 13 September - Three soldiers of Pakistan Army were killed in a cross-border attack from Afghanistan in the Kurram district.
- 28 September - One police officer was killed by unidentified person in Mardan.
- 28 September - Four Frontier Constabulary personnel were injured in a hand grenade attack in Bara, Khyber district.

== October–December ==
- 16 November - 2022 Lakki Marwat attack
- 30 November - November 2022 Quetta bombing
- 3 December – One police officer was killed by unidentified person in Mardan.
- 14 December - December 2022 Miranshah suicide bombing
- 18 December - 2022 Bannu CTD centre attack
- 23 December - 2022 Islamabad suicide attack
- 25 December - Five Pakistan Army personnel were killed in an improvised explosive device (IED) blast during a clearance operation in Kahan, Balochistan.
- 29 December - At least three soldiers of Pakistan Army were killed in clashes with terrorists near the border with Afghanistan.

== See also ==
- 2022 in Pakistan
- Terrorist incidents in Pakistan in 2021
- Terrorist incidents in Pakistan in 2023
