= Political Parties Order, 2002 =

Chief Executive of Pakistan
- Long title: An Order to revise, consolidate and re-enact the law relating to political parties
- Citation: Order No. 18 of 2002, F. No.2(4)/2002
- Territorial extent: Whole of Pakistan, except Federally Administered Tribal Areas
- Passed: June 28th, 2002

Repeals
- Election Act, 2017

Amended by
- Political Parties Order (Amendment) Bill, 2013
- Status: Repealed

The Political Parties Order, 2002 was an executive order in Pakistan stating that any person can become a member of a political party as long as they are not in the service of Pakistan and that a person cannot become a political party office-bearer if they are disqualified from being a parliamentarian by Articles 62 and 63 of the Constitution of Pakistan. The order was repealed by the Election Act, 2017.
