= 2022 Sibi explosion =

2022 Sibi explosion may refer to:

- 2022 Sibi suicide bombing
- 2022 Sibi IED explosion
