= PTI intra-party elections case =

2024 court case in Pakistan

Election Commission of Pakistan versus Pakistan Tehreek-e-Insaf
- Court: Supreme Court of Pakistan
- Decided: January 13, 2024
- Transcript: Detailed verdict

Case history
- Prior actions: Election Commission of Pakistan verdict against Pakistan Tehreek-e-Insaf; Peshawar High Court verdict in favor of Pakistan Tehreek-e-Insaf
- Appealed from: Election Commission of Pakistan
- Appealed to: Supreme Court of Pakistan

Court membership
- Judges sitting: Qazi Faez Isa; Muhammad Ali Mazhar; Musarrat Hilali

Case opinions
- Decision by: Qazi Faez Isa
- Concurrence: Muhammad Ali Mazhar; Musarrat Hilali

The Election Commission of Pakistan v. Pakistan Tehreek-e-Insaf, informally referred to as the PTI intra-party elections case, was a court case which involved a three-member bench of the Supreme Court of Pakistan (SCP), comprising Chief Justice Qazi Faez Isa, Justice Muhammad Ali Mazhar, and Justice Musarrat Hilali. In this case, the SCP affirmed the initial decision of the Election Commission of Pakistan (ECP) of prohibiting Pakistan Tehreek-e-Insaf (PTI) from retaining its electoral symbol, citing alleged irregularities in its intra-party elections conducted on 2 December 2023.

== Background ==
According to the Election Act (2017), intra-party elections must be held within a registered political party, according to its constitution and the time frame stipulated within it. The last elections were held in PTI during June 2016 with the next one to be held on or before 13 June 2021. However, in response to ECP's notice, the party stated that it had failed to hold the elections due to the COVID pandemic and asked for a year until June 2022. The party conducted its elections on 8 June 2022, but the ECP refused to accept the elections citing lack of provision of a formal certificate for the same.

In August 2023, ECP warned PTI to respond to the notices sent to it regarding the conduct of the intra-party elections or lose its electoral symbol. In a final order passed on 23 November 2023, ECP ordered PTI to conduct its intra-party elections within 20 days or become ineligible to retain its electoral symbol. In response, PTI conducted its intra-party election again on 2 December 2023. However, the conduct of the elections were challenged before the ECP by Akbar S. Babar. The commission decided that the elections were not held according to the constitution of the party and decided against letting PTI retain its electoral symbol. PTI termed the order of ECP as "deeply flawed, illegal, biased, and an assault on the integrity of the electoral process.", meanwhile challenging it in both the Lahore High Court and the Peshawar High Court.

== Case details ==
On 13 January 2024, less than a month before the 2024 elections, a three-member SCP bench led by Isa affirmed the ECP's decision, overturning a previous PHC reversal. The ECP's initial order declared PTI ineligible to retain their election symbol, the cricket bat, as they failed to conduct intra-party elections according to their constitution. PHC's two-member bench had earlier deemed ECP's order "illegal" and of no effect. The SCP bench, in contrast, supported the ECP's findings, emphasizing PTI's violation of its constitution and denial of members' rights to participate in leadership selection. PTI maintained that the elections were held according to the procedure laid down in its constitution and that members approaching the court against said elections, including Akbar S. Babar, were no longer members of the party.

In its detailed verdict released on 13 January 2024, PHC maintained a political party's right to contest elections under a common symbol, arguing against denial based on an "absurd provision of law." PHC also asserted that ECP lacked the authority to question a party's intraparty elections. The SCP bench disagreed with PHC, stating that such an interpretation would render ineffective provisions mandating intra-party elections.

Following the SCP's decision, PTI candidates must now run as independent candidates with individually assigned symbols. The party also lost the right to nominate candidates for 226 reserved seats across the central and provincial legislatures.

== Reactions ==
The timing and interpretation of the relevant law by the bench led some legal experts to describe the ruling as a "huge blow to fundamental rights", "inconsistent with case law", and "a defeat for democratic norms." Human Rights Commission of Pakistan said that "excluding a major political party from elections on technical grounds will destabilize democracy. With this decision, the transparency of the general elections in 2024 is likely to become more controversial."

On 16 January 2024, PTI, through senior consul, Latif Khosa, withdrew a separate case being heard by the same bench. The case dealt with alleged pre-poll rigging being done for the upcoming election. Khosa remarked that instead the "party wants to resort to the people’s court for the cause of democracy and the citizens of Pakistan".

== Review Petition ==
On 6 February 2024, PTI filed an intra-court appeal against the verdict arguing that it violated fundamental rights and that "the Elections Act does not give any right, power or jurisdiction to ECP to adjudicate any dispute relating to intra-party elections or refuse to give it a common symbol based on any alleged irregularity in the intra-party elections".
