= Naeemul Haque =

Pakistani politician (1949–2019)

Naeem ul Haq
- نعیم الحق

Special Assistant to the Prime Minister on Political Affairs
- In office 20 August 2018 – 15 February 2020
- President: Arif Alvi; Mamnoon Hussain
- Prime Minister: Imran Khan
- Preceded by: Asif Kirmani

Personal details
- Born: 11 July 1949 Karachi, Sindh, Pakistan
- Died: 15 February 2020 (aged 70) Karachi, Sindh, Pakistan
- Party: PTI (1996-2020); Tehreek-e-Istiqlal (1984-1996)

Naeem ul Haque (11 July 1949 – 15 February 2020) was a Pakistani politician who was the Special Assistant to the Prime Minister of Pakistan Imran Khan on Political Affairs. He was also co-founder of the Pakistan Tehreek-e-Insaf (PTI) in 1996 and served as its Central Information Secretary and President of PTI Sindh. He died on 15 February 2020 after battling cancer for 2 years.

== Early life and education ==
Naeem ul Haq was born in Karachi on 11 July 1949. He obtained a Master’s degree in English Literature from the University of Karachi in 1970 and completed his LLB from Sindh Muslim Law College in 1971. As a law practitioner, he collaborated with senior lawyer Khalid Ishaq before transitioning into corporate finance, joining the National Bank of Pakistan (NBP).

== Professional career ==
Early in his career, Haq worked in banking and finance. He was part of the team that helped establish the National Bank of Pakistan's branch at UN Plaza in New York City. In 1980, he relocated to London, where he served as a merchant banker with Oriental Credit Limited. It was during that time that he'd meet Imran Khan, who used to play county cricket in the country.

Over the course of his professional career, he also held leadership positions in several companies. He served as an advisor and managing director of Aero Asia Airlines, chairman and chief executive officer of Metropolitan Steel Corporation, and managing director of Credit & Leasing Corporation.

== Political career ==
After a successful two-decade career in banking, Haq returned to Pakistan and joined Tehreek‑e‑Istiqlal in 1984. He contested the 1988 general election from Karachi’s Orangi Town but was unsuccessful.

He co-founded Pakistan Tehreek-e-Insaf (PTI) in 1996 alongside Imran Khan. He held various leadership positions in the party, including President of PTI Sindh and Information Secretary. He was also a member of the party’s core committee and played a role in organizing the 2011 PTI rally in Karachi.

After PTI came to power in 2018, he was appointed Special Assistant to the Prime Minister for Political Affairs until his death.

== Death ==
Naeem ul Haq was diagnosed with blood cancer in early 2018 and continued political activities while undergoing treatment. He died on 15 February 2020 at the Aga Khan University Hospital in Karachi at the age of 70.

His death was widely mourned across political lines. Prime Minister Imran Khan, President Arif Alvi, and other national leaders offered condolences and praised his loyalty and service.
