= Fauzia Kasuri =

Pakistani politician (born 1952)

Personal details
- Born: 8 September 1952 (age 74) Karachi, Sindh, Pakistan
- Spouse: Danial Kasuri
- Education: University of North Carolina; St. Joseph's College
- Occupation: Politician

Fauzia Kasuri (Urdu: فوزیہ قصوری, born September 8, 1952) is a Pakistani politician who was until recently one of the central figures of Pakistan Tehreek-e-Insaf.

== Career ==
=== Pakistan Tehreek-e-Insaf ===
Kasuri is a former member and recent critic of the PTI, a political party in Pakistan. She resigned 2 months before the 2018 Pakistani General Elections. Apart from raising funds for the party, she had been President of the Women's Wing of the party for 17 years and was responsible for building women chapters of the party in Europe, the Middle East and the US. She had been a member of the Manifesto and Constitution Committees of the party and had played a leading role in nurturing the women and youth wings within the party.

She was a long time volunteer for the Shaukat Khanum Memorial Cancer Hospital and Research Center, involved in international fund raising for the charity. Kasuri also had a long track record of fund raising for the Imran Khan. Having been affiliated with many social causes like SOS and the Layton Rahmatullah Benevolent Trust, she is also on the board of I-Care Foundation in Pakistan and was a leading figure for the relief work with the internally displaced persons from Waziristan.

== Personal life and education ==
Fauzia Kasuri was born in Karachi, Pakistan. She studied at the Karachi American School and St Joseph's College, graduating with a Bachelor of Arts degree from the University of Karachi. She later joined the MBA program at the University of North Carolina, studying economics and statistics.
