= Military budget of Pakistan =

The military budget of Pakistan (Urdu: پاکستان کا فوجی بجٹ) is a part of the federal discretionary budget, allocated to the Ministry of Defence and Ministry of Defence Production. The budget covers the salaries, training, and healthcare of both uniformed and civilian personnel, maintains military arms, equipment, and facilities, supports operations, and funds the acquisition and development of new arms and equipment.

As of 2024, Pakistan’s defense budget is 1.7 percent of its GDP. This represents a decrease compared to previous years, with the defense spending in 2022-23 being around 2% of the country’s GDP. Despite facing economic challenges, Pakistan continues to allocate a substantial portion of its budget to defense.

== Military budgets ==
Pakistan's defence expenditure has seen fluctuations over the years. The military budget of Pakistan as the percentage of total budget from 1971 to 2022 is given below:

Defence expenditure data
Year	Defence expenditure (in million)	Percentage of total expenditure
1970–1971	3,201.5	55.66
1971–1972	3,725.5	59.09
1972–1973	4,439.6	59.34
1973–1974	4,948.6	42.20
1974–1975	6,914.2	42.83
1975–1976	8,103.4	25.10
1976–1977	8,102.6	23.10
1977–1978	9,674.5	23.7
1978–1979	10,302.0	21.0
1979–1980	12,654.8	23.2
1980–1981	15,300.1	23.2
1981–1982	18,631.0	24.5
1982–1983	23,224.0	26.7
1983–1984	26,798.0	26.8
1984–1985	31,866.0	27.3
1985–1986	35,606.0	26.5
1986–1987	41,335.0	27.1
1987–1988	47,015.0	26.1
1988–1989	51,053.0	25.4
1989–1990	58,708.0	26.5
1990–1991	64,623.0	24.8
1991–1992	75,751.0	23.6
1992–1993	87,441.0	25.0
1993–1994	91,776.0	25.2
1994–1995	100,221.0	23.4
1995–1996	115,252.0	23.3
1996–1997	131,400.0	26.26
1997–1998	133,834.0	26.2
1998–1999	145,000.0	26.1
1999–2000	142,000.0	22.0
2000–2001	163,000.00	24.0
2001–2002	189,000.00	22.6
2002–2003	202,000.00	45.4
2003–2004	228,000.00	26.1
2004–2005	253,000.00	24.5
2005–2006	293,000.00	21.4
2006–2007	306,000.00	18.0
2007–2008	343,000.00	16.1
2008–2009	393,000.00	16.9
2009–2010	469,000.00	16.8
2010–2011	549,000.00	17.0
2011–2012	652,000.00	16.1
2012–2013	744,974.00	15.9
2013–2014	811,104.00	17.3
2014–2015	943,288.00	18.0
2015–2016	1,010,647.00	18.1
2016–2017	1,086,228.00	17.6
2017–2018	1,306,085.00	18.8
2018–2019	1,505,362.00	18.4
2019–2020	1,565,642.00	17.2
2020–2021	1,749,521.00	18.4
2021–2022	2,035,325.00	15.9
2022–2023	2,199,892.00	14.5
Note: The fiscal year in Pakistan was from April to March in 1957, shifted to April to June in 1958, and has been from July to June since 1959.

== Criticism ==
The high defense spending has sparked debates about its impact on Pakistan’s socio-economic growth. Critics argue that the military budget takes a significant portion of the federal budget and results in economic inequality in Pakistan.

The transparency of Pakistan's military expenditure has been criticized. Major acquisitions by the armed forces, expenditure on the Public Sector Development Program (PSDP), expenditure on the nuclear program and para-military forces, payment of military pensions, and a few other military expenditures do not appear in the budget.

Despite ongoing economic hardships, including IMF-imposed austerity measures and reduced public spending, Pakistan’s military budget continued to rise significantly. In the 2024–25 fiscal year, defence spending increased to approximately PKR 2.13 trillion, with an 11 percent year-on-year rise in military salaries and pensions. At the same time, essential sectors such as education and healthcare remained underfunded, receiving only 2 percent and 1.3 percent of GDP, respectively. In June 2025, following a military confrontation with India, Pakistan further raised its defence allocation by more than 20 percent—the largest increase in a decade—bringing the total to 2.55 trillion rupees (approximately $9 billion), or 1.97 percent of GDP. This nearly doubled the military budget compared to the 2020–21 fiscal year, when it stood at 1.28 trillion rupees, reflecting a continued prioritisation of defence spending despite the country’s wider economic challenges.

It is a belief among some scholars that the Pakistani military’s deep involvement in the economy has hindered the country’s democratic and economic development. Through a network of businesses operating outside civilian oversight, the military has gained financial autonomy that reinforces its political dominance. This concentration of economic power, according to critics, distorts markets, reduces transparency, and diverts public resources from essential civilian sectors. The resulting imbalance weakens democratic institutions, limits accountability, and constrains long-term, inclusive economic growth.
