= 2022 Balochistan local government elections =

Local elections in Pakistan

- 29 May 2022

All local government seats in 32 districts of Balochistan N/A seats needed for a majority
- Turnout: N/A
	First party	Second party	Third party
Leader	N/A
Party	Independent	JUI (F)	BAP
Last election	N/A
Seats won	N/A	98	71
Seat change	N/A
Popular vote	N/A
Percentage	N/A
	Fourth party	Fifth party	Sixth party
Party	Pashtunkhwa Milli Awami Party (PKMAP)	BNP (M)	NP
Seats won	39	37	26
	Seventh party	Eighth party	Ninth party
Party	PPP	Tehreek-e-Insaf	Pak Sarzamin Party
Seats won	26	7	5

The 2022 Balochistan local government elections were held in 32 districts of Balochistan, Pakistan on 29 May 2022. Independent candidates won the most seats, while 1584 candidates were elected unopposed. According to the results, 98 candidates of Jamiat Ulema-e-Islam (F), 71 of Balochistan Awami Party, 39 of Pashtunkhwa Milli Awami Party (PKMAP) and 37 of Balochistan National Party have won. Besides, National Party and PPP have won 26 seats, Tehreek-e-Insaf 7 seats and Pak Sarzamin Party (PSP) 5 seats.

== See also ==
- Local government in Pakistan
