= 2022–23 Pakistan federal budget =

2022-2023 Federal Budget
- Submitted by: Miftah Ismail
- Submitted to: 15th National Assembly
- Presented: 10 June 2022
- Passed: 29 June 2022
- Parliament: Pakistan
- Party: Pakistan Muslim League (N)
- Finance minister: Miftah Ismail
- Treasurer: Ministry of Finance

The 2022–23 Federal Budget of Pakistan was presented on 10 June 2022 by Finance Minister Miftah Ismail, with Rs 9.5 trillion budgeted for expenditure in financial year 2022–2023, which was nearly a trillion higher than the previous financial year. On 29 June 2022, the National Assembly of Pakistan approved the passage of the Finance Bill, 2022. In February 2023, Pakistani cabinet approved 'Finance Supplementary Bill 2023' for Mini Budget. The budget for FY2022-23 aimed to raise Rs. 7 trillion ($34.6 billion) in tax revenue, raise Rs. 372 billion ($1.8 billion) from Sukuk and Eurobonds, target a primary surplus of 0.2% of GDP, target a fiscal deficit of 49% of GDP and meet IMF benchmarks.

== Budgetary Policies ==
(Excluding overlapping mentions)

Dawn reported the following budget measures:

- Pensioner tax reduced from 10% to 5%
- Subsidies on sugar, wheat, and flour
- Rs699bn on targeted subsidies in fiscal year
- Defence expenditure at Rs1.52tr
- Inflation forecast at 11.5%
- Tax-to-GDP ratio set at 9.2%
- FBR given target of Rs7 trillion
- Deficit target set at Rs3.8 trillion
- Total of Rs9.5 trillion in expenditure
- Government salaries increased by 15%
- No taxes for government employes making less than Rs100,000 per month
- Families with incomes less than Rs40,000 to be disbursed Rs2,000
- Households using less than 200 units of electricity offered loans in instalments to buy solar panels

Bloomberg News reported the following budget measures:

- Pakistan primary surplus target of 0.2% of GDP
- Targeted fiscal deficit of 4.9% of GDP
- Increased tax on banks and fertilizers
- Luxury tax on cars with 1,600cc engine size and above.
- Tax on real estate transactions to 2% versus 1% for tax-payers
- Increased taxes on tobacco companies by a third to 200 billion rupees
- Fuel cuts for government employees

PricewaterhouseCoopers (PwC) International listed the following budget measures:

- A 2% Poverty Alleviation Tax introduced on individuals with income exceeding Rs 300 million.
- General tax rate for banking companies increased from 35% to 45%.
- A 1% tax on deemed rental income applied to the fair market value of certain immovable properties owned by resident persons in Pakistan.
- Revised capital gains tax on immovable properties in Pakistan to tax sales of open plots held for less than six years.
- Capital gains on foreign held immovable properties will be taxed at the standard rate regardless of the holding period.
- A Capital Value Tax of 1% imposed on offshore assets of residents exceeding Rs 100 million, and 5% on vehicles valued above Rs 5 million.
- Advance tax for nonfiler purchasers of immovable properties raised from 2% to 5%.
- Adjusted slab rates for salaried individuals to reduce tax impact on lowincome employees and increase it on higher income brackets.
- Withdrawal of tax credits for investments in listed securities, insurance policies, and deductible house loan allowances.
- Discontinued carry forward for minimum tax.
- Interest income from government securities now taxed at the standard rate instead of 15%.
- Reduced tax rate on income from Bahbood certificates from 10% to 5%.
- Tax credit on income from software and IT exports withdrawn, with a 0.25% tax on export proceeds of these services.
- Commercial importers now taxed under a final tax regime.
- A new 10% withholding tax imposed on international money transfer facilitation fees.
- Increased withholding tax on offshore digital services fees from 5% to 10%.
- Removed CNIC requirement for taxable supplies to unregistered persons.
- Amended definition of resident individual to include Pakistani citizens not residing in any other country.
- Adjusted capital gains tax on listed securities, with higher rates for holding periods under one year.
- Mandated electronic submission of beneficial ownership details for companies and AOPs.
- Introduced an ICT sales tax exemption on locally provided IT and ITenabled services.
- Removed the exception allowing listed companies to claim input tax beyond 90%.
- Extended further tax to registered persons not on the Active Taxpayers List.
- Extended sales tax exemption to all imported and locally supplied books.
- Higher FED imposed on telecommunication services in Islamabad,
- Introduced the concept of essential commodities in Customs law, with plans to include them as smuggled goods.
- Reintroduced sales tax exemption for imported machinery, equipment, and materials used exclusively within Export Processing Zones.
- Tax amnesties under the industry promotion package withdrawn.
- Simplified tax regime introduced for retailers and certain service providers.
- Revamped the Alternative Dispute Resolution mechanism.
- Abolished withholding tax on education fees and machinery usage payments.
- Reinstated withholding tax on remittances via debit or credit cards.
- Increased advance tax on vehicle registrations.

== See also ==
- 2022 Pakistan economic crisis
