= 2022 Sindh local government elections =

Local elections in Pakistan

2022 Sindh local body elections
- June 24, 2022 (1st phase)
Party	PPP	GDA	Independent
Party	PTI	JUI (F)

On June 24, 2022, the first round of local body elections were held in 14 districts of Sindh. According to the results, the Pakistan People's Party has won 225 seats in the municipal committee. GDA has won 18 seats while 19 independents have won, PTI has won 14 and JUI has won 7 seats while other parties have won two seats.

== Second phase ==
Held on 15 January 2023.

== See also ==
- Local government in Pakistan
