= PTI foreign funding case =

Prohibited funding case of Pakistan Tehreek-e-Insaf

- Court: Election Commission of Pakistan
- Decided: August 2, 2022
- Verdict: Proven
- Defendant: Pakistan Tehreek-e-Insaf
- Plaintiff: Akbar S. Babar

The PTI foreign funding case is a case against the Pakistan Tehreek-e-Insaf alleging that it obtained funds from Sheikh Nahyan bin Mubarak Al Nahyan, overseas Pakistanis, and their companies. One of those overseas Pakistanis was the well-known Pakistani businessman Arif Naqvi, who, according to the Wall Street Journal, had also provided funds to Nawaz Sharif and his colleagues. The Islamabad High Court, in its detailed judgement on 5 April 2023, pronounced that not enough documentary evidence existed to implicate Imran Khan in the case.

== Background ==
Akbar S. Babar, a former member of PTI had filed a petition in the Election Commission in 2014 against irregularities in party funds, on which the ECP's scrutiny committee held 96 hearings in the court. Babar had alleged that millions of dollars had been transferred to PTI bank accounts through two offshore companies and that the PTI had kept these bank accounts secret from the Election Commission.

== Election Commission Scrutiny Committee report ==
According to the 225-page report of the scrutiny committee set up by the Election Commission of Pakistan, Pakistan Tehreek-e-Insaf (PTI) disclosed 12 bank accounts in the Election Commission while keeping 53 accounts hidden. Besides, donations of more than Rs 31 crore have not been disclosed to the Election Commission. The PTI has shown only 12 bank accounts out of 77, while New Zealand and Canada accounts have not been accessed.

The report states that in 2008 and 2009, 2012 and 2013, the PTI made donations of Rs 1.33 billion to the Election Commission of Pakistan. The ECP was allegedly given incorrect information regarding the donations as the State Bank of Pakistan statement showed that PTI received donations of Rs 1.64 billion out of which Rs 31 crore were concealed.

=== Verdict ===
On 2 August, 2022, the Election Commission of Pakistan said in its decision that the allegations of taking prohibited funds from overseas Pakistanis against the Pakistan Tehreek-e-Insaaf party of former Prime Minister Imran Khan have been proved. The Election Commission has issued a show-cause notice to PTI as to why these funds should not be confiscated and at the same time has announced to send the matter to the federal government. Tehreek-e-Insaf has announced to challenge this decision in court.

== Criticism ==
Imran Khan reacted to the judgement by saying that the funds were collected in 2012 by overseas Pakistanis and said that the law which prohibits funding was made in 2017 and that there is no law which bans funding from overseas Pakistanis.

Following the judgement, an overseas Pakistani Beenish Faridi who donated to the Pakistan Tehreek-e-Insaf, took the Election Commission of Pakistan to court for declaring her a non-Pakistani and her funding as foreign.
