= Akbar S. Babar =

Pakistani politician

- Born: Balochistan, Pakistan
- Occupations: Politician, Civil Engineer
- Known for: Role in Pakistan Tehreek-e-Insaf foreign funding case
- Office: Former Pakistan Tehreek-e-Insaf Member
- Parent: Abdul Majeed Babar (father)

Akbar S. Babar is a Pakistani politician. Akbar S Babar is a founding member of Pakistan Tehreek-e-Insaf (پاکستان تحریک انصاف).

== Early life ==
Babar hails from Balochistan. He is a civil engineer by profession, while his father Abdul Majeed Babar is a retired lieutenant colonel in the Pakistan Army. Before joining Pakistan Tehreek-e-Insaaf, he started his professional career as a Project Director at USAID in 1992. After leaving the job, he worked for some time in United Nations projects in Balochistan and after that he started a consultancy in the social sector.

== Political career ==
In the general elections held in 1997, he contested the National Assembly election from Chagai District of Balochistan in which he got around 1500 votes. Babar has also served as the Information Secretary of Pakistan Tehreek-e-Insaaf.

=== Expulsion from Pakistan Tehreek-e-Insaf ===
In 2011 party had expelled Babar and revoked his membership, following all legal procedures.

=== PTI Websites Blocked in Pakistan ===
Babar had filed a petition in 2014 against the irregularities in party funds of Pakistan Tehreek-e-Insaf in the Election Commission, on which the Scrutiny Committee of ECP conducted 96 hearings in the court. Babar had alleged that lakhs of dollars were transferred to PTI's bank accounts through two offshore companies and PTI kept these bank accounts secret from the Election Commission.

On 2 August 2022, the Election Commission of Pakistan has said in its decision that the allegations of taking prohibited funds from abroad against the Pakistan Tehreek-e-Insaaf party of former Prime Minister Imran Khan have been proved. The Election Commission has issued a show-cause notice to PTI as to why these funds should not be confiscated and at the same time has announced to send the matter to the federal government. Tehreek-e-Insaf has announced to challenge this decision in court.

Addressing a press conference, PTI's central spokesperson dismissed the objections, saying they lacked any legal standing due to his departure from PTI thirteen years ago.
