= Dasht, Kharan =

Dasht دشت
- Town (and tehsil)
- Location in Pakistan Dasht دشت (Pakistan)
- Coordinates: 28°36′30″N 66°18′50″E
- Country: Pakistan
- Province: Balochistan
- Elevation: 1,796 m (5,892 ft)
- Time zone: UTC+05:00 (PST)

Dasht (Urdu: دشت) is a town and tehsil of Kharan District in the Balochistan province of Pakistan.The town is located at 28°36′30″N 66°18′50″E at an altitude of 1,796 m (5,892 ft). The population of the tehsil was 58,621 in 1998.
