= Sherani District wildfire =

Wild fires in Balochistan province of Pakistan

- Date: May 18, 2022
- Location: Sherani District, Balochistan, Pakistan

Impacts
- Deaths: 3
- Injuries: 3
- Structures lost: Unknown

Ignition
- Cause: Lightning or negligence of local nomads

On 18 May 2022, a wildfire killed at least 3 people and destroyed thousands of pine-trees in Sherani District of Balochistan, Pakistan.

There are forests of Chilgoza in this area and these forests have been engulfed in fire. The fire spread over an area of about five to six kilometers and efforts are being made to extinguish it.

Three people were killed and three were injured when locals tried to put out the blaze. The dead and injured have been shifted to Zhob Civil Hospital. According to the forest department, the fire started due to lightning or negligence of the local nomads. Due to the dry weather, the fire is spreading rapidly, while the fire has damaged wildlife, including chilgoza and olive trees.
