= Federal Shariah Court verdict on interest system in Pakistan =

Pakistani law

- Court: Federal Shariah Court
- Decided: June 2022

Case history
- Subsequent action: Challenged in Supreme Court of Pakistan

Keywords
- Interest system, Usury, Shariah Law, Banking system

In 1992, the Federal Shariah Court ordered the abolition of the interest rate system in Pakistan, which was later challenged in the Supreme Court of Pakistan. The Supreme Court later referred the decision back to the Federal Shariah Court in 2002 for reconsideration. In its judgement, the Federal Shariah Court declared all legal provisions relating to usury from 1 June 2022 to be non-Shari'a, stating that "interest taken in any case, including debt, falls under the category of usury." And the federal government has been ordered to completely abolish interest rates and implement a usury-free banking system in the country within a period of five years. On 25 June 2022 the State Bank of Pakistan along with four other banks challenged the decision of the Federal Shariah Court against interest in the Supreme Court.

== Background ==
The Supreme Court of Pakistan, during the tenure of former President General (retd) Pervez Musharraf, passed the decision of the Federal Shariah Court on 14 November 1991 in which interest was declared un-Islamic. Following this, on 23 December 1999, the Appellate Shariah Bench of the Supreme Court upheld the 1992 order of the Shariah Court and declared it null and void.
