= Pakistan audio leaks controversy =

The Pakistan audio leaks controversy stems from several leaked audio conversations involving Pakistan's prime minister Shehbaz Sharif and former prime minister Imran Khan among others. The leaks began on 24 September 2022, when multiple audio files of purported conversations, allegedly recorded in the Prime Minister's Office, surfaced online. On 28 September 2022, a National Security Committee (NSC) meeting was convened to discuss matters related to national security, including the audio leaks.

== Audio leaks case ==
In May 2023, Najam Saqib, son of former chief justice of Pakistan Saqib Nisar, filed a petition in the Islamabad High Court (IHC) against a National Assembly committee tasked with investigating his purported audio leak.

In September 2023, Bushra Bibi filed a petition in the Islamabad High Court (IHC) over the issue of an alleged phone conversation leak between her and the former prime minister Imran Khan’s special assistant Zulfi Bukhari.

On 12 September 2023, the IHC clubbed the petition of Bushra Bibi with the identical petition of Najam Saqib in the audio leaks case.

In April 2024, the Pakistan Electronic Media Regulatory Authority (PEMRA), the Pakistan Telecommunication Authority (PTA), the Federal Investigation Agency (FIA) and the Intelligence Bureau (IB) requested the recusal of Justice Babar Sattar from hearing audio leaks’ case. On 29 April, Justice Sattar rejected pleas from the PEMRA, PTA and the FIA requesting his recusal and imposed fines of Rs 500,000 on each of the institutions. On 3 May, it emerged that the IHC had also dismissed the IB’s plea seeking the judge's recusal.

On 29 May 2024, the IHC issued a restraining order with regard to accessing data of consumers and its use. It restrained telecom companies from phone tapping for surveillance.

On 25 June 2024, the IHC rejected the government's plea for the in-chamber hearing of the audio leaks case. On 5 July, the federal government filed an appeal in the Supreme Court under Article 185(3) of the constitution against the IHC’s order.
