= 2022 Sindhi–Afghan strife =

Ethnic riots in Pakistan

On July 12 violent incidents erupted in the Sindh and Balochistan provinces of Pakistan after the killing of Bilal Kaka, a young Sindhi man, by an Afghan hotel owner in Hyderabad. People from different cities of Sindh stormed shops owned by Afghan immigrants and forced them to close their businesses. Later on, people demanded justice for the deceased person on social media by running the hashtag #JusticeForBilalKaka. As a retaliation, Afghanis living in Pakistan and Pashtoons stopped Sindhis from traveling to Balochistan and forcefully laid them off from the public buses and vans. They stormed the M9 motorway on 14 July and damaged vehicles and set them on fire. Pashtoons also ran hashtag #پشتون_کوجینےدیں (let Pashtoon live) on Twitter.

== Background ==
After the Afghan Jihad against the USSR, millions of Afghan refugees settled in Pakistan. Many of them never returned to their country. These people brought Kalashnikov culture and drug smuggling to Pakistan which gave rise to extremism and sectarianism in the country. The numbers of these refugees multiplied further after the incident of 9/11 and subsequent war on terror in Afghanistan. The people of Sindh got worried about this increasing influx and protested against the further coming of refugees in Sindh. In February 2019, Irshad Ranjhani, a nationalist worker, was killed in Karachi by Raheem Shah, a Pashtoon by origin which resulted in protests all over Sindh against Afghans. Later on in July 2021, a nephew of Sindhi singer Shaman Ali Mirali was shot by Pashtoons in Karachi which also caused anger among Sindhis.
