= 2022 Karachi fire =

Bushfire in Sindh, Pakistan

Coordinates: 24.9129468°N 67.0971667°E

- Date: June 12, 2022
- Location: Gulshan-e-Iqbal area of Karachi East District, Pakistan

Statistics
- Land use: Urban

Ignition
- Cause: Bush fire

On 12 June 2022, a fire broke out in a bush near Aziz Bhatti Park in Gulshan-e-Iqbal area of Karachi East District, burning hundreds of vehicles including 500 motorcycles, 6 to 7 vehicles, 2 rickshaws and a bus.
