= Pakistan and the International Monetary Fund =

Pakistan has been a member of the International Monetary Fund (IMF) since 1950. Due to the high unpredictable nature of its economy and its dependence on imports, the IMF has provided loans to Pakistan 24 times, with its most recent being in 2024.

== History ==
Pakistan joined IMF on 11 July 1950 as newly established country was facing fiscal problems since its creation in 1947 from British India.

In 1958, for the first time, Pakistan went to IMF for bailout. For this, IMF lent out US$25,000,000 (equivalent to $278,979,239 in 2025) [originally the loan-amount is given in SDR; for this article it is considered to be 1SDR = 1USD] to Pakistan on standby arrangement basis on 8 December 1958. Pakistan again went to IMF in 1965. This time, IMF gave US$37,500 (equivalent to $383,118 in 2025) to war-torn nation on 16 March 1965. Three years later, Pakistan again went to IMF for third time for balance of payment problems for which IMF gave US$75,000 (equivalent to $694,378 in 2025) on 17 October 1968.

In 1971, Pakistan lost its Eastern half, East Pakistan, after the Bangladesh Liberation War. This war caused huge loses to Pakistan. For which, Pakistan got loan of US$84,000 (equivalent to $646,539 in 2025) in 1972, US$75,000 (equivalent to $543,947 in 2025) in 1973 and another of US$75,000 (equivalent to $489,626 in 2025) in 1974 to meet its growing needs. In 1977, another standby arrangement of US$80,000 (equivalent to $425,041 in 2025) was made on urgent basis. Three years later, an extended facility of US$349,000 (equivalent to $1,363,722 in 2025) was reached in 1980. Struggle of Pakistan continued, as Pakistan withdrew another US$730,000 (equivalent to $2,585,194 in 2025) in 1981 as Pakistan was already part of US cold war against Soviet Union.

Another era was started, as democracy came back to Pakistan but old ways to handle economy poorly continued. Benazir Bhutto government withdrawn US$194,480 (equivalent to $529,430 in 2025) as standby arrangement and another US$382,410 (equivalent to $1,041,029 in 2025) in shape of structural adjustment facility commitment - both on 28 December 1988. In 1990, government of Nawaz Sharif decided against going to IMF instead arranged donations from friendly countries like Saudi Arabia.

In 1993, Benazir Bhutto again came to power and her government again went to IMF and reached an agreement to get standby arrangement of US$88,000 (equivalent to $196,130 in 2025) on 16 September 1993. Poor handling of economy continued by her government as she got loan of US$123,200 (equivalent to $267,616 in 2025) under the extended fund facility and another US$172,200 (equivalent to $374,054 in 2025) were borrowed - both on 22 February 1994. During that period economy of Pakistan remained in poor shape and Pakistan had to go to IMF again for record third in the period of Bhutto government. As per few sources, this was the most corrupt government in the history of Pakistan. This time Pakistan got an amount of US$294,690 (equivalent to $622,652 in 2025) on 13 December 1995.

In 1997, Nawaz Sharif came to power. Benazir Bhutto government was sacked on the corruption charges and left economy of Pakistan in worst shape. Sharif government went to IMF on urgent basis for the first time and reached an agreement to get two amounts of US$265,370 (equivalent to $532,225 in 2025) and US$113,740 (equivalent to $228,117 in 2025) on October 20, 1997.

On 29 November 2000, an amount of US$465,000 (equivalent to $869,348 in 2025) was drawn as standby arrangement. One year later, Pakistan again went to IMF for US$861,420 (equivalent to $1,566,292 in 2025) under the extended fund facility on 06 December 2001.

In 2008, Yousaf Raza Gillani received the largest-ever US$7.6 (equivalent to $11.36 in 2025) billion loan from the IMF, however a total sum of $4,936,035 had been withdrawn.

Pakistan was provided by the IMF with financial assistance amounting to US$4,320,000 (equivalent to $5,970,857 in 2025) through an Extended Fund Facility on September 04, 2013.

In 2018, Imran Khan became Prime Minister of Pakistan. For this, they arranged friendly loans from Saudi Arabia, United Arab Emirates and China to avoid tough IMF conditions. In 2019, when economic conditions worsened, they went to IMF for the twenty-second time for a loan of US$1 billion. IMF gave loan based on conditions such as hike in energy tariffs, removal of energy subsidy, increase in taxation, privatization of public entities and fiscal policies to the budget.

On 30 June 2023, the IMF and Pakistan reached an agreement at the staff level for a stand-by arrangement worth $3 billion. This agreement came at a critical time for Pakistan, as it was facing the risk of defaulting on its financial obligations.

In July 2024, Pakistan reached a staff-level agreement for a new US$7 billion loan deal with the IMF. Later in September 2024, the executive board of the IMF approved a US$7 billion loan for Pakistan, which the country will receive in installments over 37 months.
