= May 2022 Miranshah suicide bombing =

Attack in North Waziristan, Pakistan

Miranshah suicide bombing
- Location: Miranshah, North Waziristan, Pakistan
- Date: May 15, 2022
- Target: Pakistan Army soldiers and civilians
- Attack type: Suicide attack
- Deaths: 6 (3 soldiers, 3 children)
- Victims: 33-year-old Lance Havaldar Zubair Qadir, 21-year-old Sepoy Uzair Asfar, 22-year-old Sepoy Qasim Maqsood, 11-year-old child, 8-year-old child, 4-year-old child

On May 15, 2022, three Pakistan Army soldiers and three children were killed after a suicide attack occurred near Miranshah, North Waziristan, according to the Inter-Services Public Relations (ISPR). The Pakistani military's media affairs wing identified the murdered soldiers as 33-year-old Lance Havaldar Zubair Qadir from Pakpattan, 21-year-old Sepoy Uzair Asfar from Haripur and 22-year-old Sepoy Qasim Maqsood from Multan. An 11-year-old, eight-year-old, and four-year-old child also died from the blast.

"Intelligence agencies are investigating to find out about [the] suicide bomber and his handlers/facilitators," the statement concluded.

Prime Minister Shehbaz Sharif condemned the suicide attack, stating "The killers of innocent children are the enemies of both Islam and humanity." He expressed grief over the lives lost. Sharjeel Memon also made a public statement condemning the attack.

== See also ==
- December 2022 Miranshah suicide bombing
