= 2022 Ghotki attack =

November 2022 terrorist attack

Ghotki police camp attack
- Date: 6 November 2022
- Location: Katcha neighborhood of Ghotki, Sindh, Pakistan
- Perpetrator: Bandits
- Outcome: Bandits seized possession of 10 police cars while holding 20 police officers hostage
- Deaths: 7 police officials killed
- Weapon: Rocket launchers

On 6 November 2022, attack by bandits on a police camp in the katcha neighbourhood of Ghotki, Sindh, resulted in the deaths of at least 7 police officials, including a DSP (deputy superintendent of police) and two SHOs (station head officers).

According to police, bandits attacked a police picket in Rawanti, a katcha area of Ghotki with rocket launchers. In the gun battle, seven cops embraced martyrdom including Abdul Malik Bhutto (DSP) and two SHOs.

The bandits seized possession of 10 police cars while holding 20 police officers hostage at the camp. As a result of the incident, reports claim that Sindh Rangers forces and police officers from around the area have been brought in to conduct operations against the dacoits.

Bilawal Bhutto Zardari, the leader of the Pakistan People's Party (PPP) and the country's foreign minister, has strongly condemned an attack.
