= 2022 Kech District attack =

Mass shooting in Balochistan, Pakistan

- Location: Dasht, Kech District, Balochistan, Pakistan
- Date: 25 January 2022
- Target: Army security post
- Attack type: Militant attack
- Weapon: Firearms
- Deaths: 10 security personnel
- Injuries: 3 security personnel
- Perpetrator: Balochistan Liberation Front
- Motive: Balochistan independence

On 25 January 2022, militants stormed an army security post in a remote area of Dasht, Kech District, Balochistan, Pakistan, killing at least ten security personnel and injuring three others. The clash lasted for a few hours in which militants also suffered several casualties. Additionally, the militants also seized weapons that were present in the security post. Locals in the area also confirmed that an attack on the security post took place and that the militants suffered heavy casualties in the attack.

Pakistani law enforcement agencies say that one militant was killed and several other militants were injured when the militants attacked the security post. Three militants responsible for the attack were also arrested by the law enforcement agencies during a search operation in the vicinity of the security post. No group has taken responsibility for the attack on security post initially. After several days, Gohram Baloch, the spokesperson of the banned Balochistan Liberation Front (BLF) claimed responsibility for the attack.

The attack on the security post was strongly condemned locally in Pakistan and internationally by Iran, Turkey and United Arab Emirates.

In response, Pakistan's law enforcement agencies killed six terrorist of Baloch Liberation Front in Injirkan Range near the district's Buleda area on 16 February 2022. The deceased terrorist were part of the group who took part in the raid on security post in Dasht.
