= Election Act, 2017 =

Pakistani law

Parliament of Pakistan
- Long title: An Act to amend, consolidate and unify laws relating to the conduct of elections
- Enacted by: Parliament of Pakistan
- Enacted: 2017

Summary
- The Election Act, 2017 is a law that was enacted to amend, consolidate, and unify laws relating to the conduct of elections in Pakistan.

The Election Act, 2017 is a law enacted to amend, and consolidate the laws relating to the conduct of elections in Pakistan. The Act has been the subject of numerous amendments and legal challenges since its enactment, including issues related to allocation of reserved seats, intra-party elections, and disqualification conditions for legislators. Despite opposition and controversy, the Act remains the cornerstone of Pakistan's electoral framework, shaping the country's democratic processes and institutions.

== Overview ==
The Act includes provisions related to the Election Commission of Pakistan, delimitation of constituencies, voter list and conduct of assembly elections. It also outlines the powers and responsibilities of the Election Commission, the procedure for delimitation of constituencies and the preparation and maintenance of electoral rolls.

== Amendments and legal challenges ==
=== Lahore High Court petition ===
A petition was filed in the Lahore High Court challenging the amendment made in Section 57 of the Election Commission Act, 2017. The amendment empowered the Election Commission of Pakistan to announce the date of the elections.

=== Voting rights of overseas Pakistanis ===
The National Assembly of Pakistan approved the amendments in the Elections Act 2017. The amendments rolled back the changes made by the Pakistan Tehreek-e-Insaaf government for electronic voting and voting rights of overseas Pakistanis in the next general elections. The law minister stated that several political parties had reservations over the use of electronic voting machines (EVMs).

=== Dilemma of reserved seats ===
Concerns have been expressed over the allocation of reserved seats for women and non-Muslims. These seats are distributed in proportion to the number of ordinary seats won in direct competition for the National Assembly and Provincial Assemblies.

=== Intra-Party polls ===
The Supreme Court issued a detailed decision to deprive Pakistan Tehreek-e-Insaaf of its electoral symbol 'cricket bat' for not holding intra-party elections to Election Commission's satisfaction.

=== Amendment to limit ‘Lifetime’ disqualification ===
A petition was filed in the Lahore High Court against the amendments made in the Elections Act, 2017, seeking a 5-year limit on 'disqualification' from contesting public offices.

=== PPP’s Letter to CEC ===
The Pakistan People's Party has written to the Chief Election Commissioner expressing concern over the reshuffle of senior police officers in Sindh, which they claimed violated Section 230 (f) of the Election Act, 2017.

=== Opposition to amendment to section 230 ===
The amendment to Section 230 of the Election Act 2017 was opposed by the ruling coalition and the opposition.

== Empowering the caretaker government ==
The Joint Session of Parliament approved amendments to the Elections Act, 2017, empowering the caretaker government to take actions or decisions related to ongoing bilateral or multilateral agreements and projects.
