= December 2022 Miranshah suicide bombing =

Bombing in North Waziristan, Pakistan

December 2022 Miran Shah bombing
- Part of War in North-West Pakistan
- Location: Miranshah, North Waziristan, Pakistan
- Date: 14 December 2022
- Target: Civilians
- Attack type: Suspected suicide bombing
- Deaths: 3
- Injuries: 5
- Perpetrator: Unknown
- Motive: Terrorism

On 14 December 2022, a suspected suicide bomber blew himself up in Miranshah, North Waziristan, killing at least three people and injuring five.

== See also ==
- 2022 Miranshah suicide bombing
