= Machar colony incident =

2022 lynching in Karachi, Pakistan

Machhar Colony lynching
- Location: Machhar Colony, Karachi, Pakistan
- Date: 28 October 2022
- Target: Two telecommunications workers
- Attack type: Lynching, mob violence
- Deaths: 2
- Perpetrator: Unidentified mob
- Motive: False rumors of attempted child kidnapping
- Accused: 34 detained

On 28 October 2022, two telecommunications workers were lynched by a mob amid reports of the kidnapping of children in Machhar Colony, Karachi. Later, Kemari district police said some people circulated "false rumors" that two attempted kidnappers were in a car near a private school. Sindh Police and Pakistan Rangers detained 34 people that night in and around the colony.
