= 2022 Panjgur and Naushki raids =

Separatist attack in Pakistan

- Part of Insurgency in Balochistan
- Location: Panjgur District, Nushki
- Date: 2 February 2022
- Target: Frontier Corps Balochistan bases in Panjgur and Noshki
- Attack type: Shooting, suicide bombing
- Deaths: 20 militants, 9 security personnel
- Perpetrator: Balochistan Liberation Army
- Motive: Baloch nationalism

The 2022 Panjgur and Naushki raids were a series of attacks on the Pakistani Frontier Corps in Balochistan claimed by the Balochistan Nationalist Army (BNA), a newly formed Balochi separatist group with ties to the Balochistan Liberation Army. On 2 February, the militants attacked both the Frontier Corps base in Nushki and an outpost in Panjgur District, as part of the insurgency in Balochistan.

Pakistani authorities said that the BLA militants were assisted by Afghanistan and India during the attacks, and that the attackers had state-of-the-art equipment and weaponry obtained from abandoned US military caches in Afghanistan after the 2021 Fall of Kabul which included M-16s, M4 carbines, night vision goggles, bullet-proof vests, and many US-made sniper rifles and pistols.

== See also ==
- Frontier Corps
- Balochistan
- Research and Analysis Wing
- Terrorist incidents in Pakistan in 2022
