= 2022 Khyber Pakhtunkhwa wildfires =

Forest fires in Khyber Pakhtunkhwa, Pakistan

- Date: May 2022 – June 2022
- Location: Khyber Pakhtunkhwa, Pakistan

Statistics
- Burned area: 14,430 acres (5,840 ha)
- Land use: Forests and pastures

Impacts
- Deaths: 4

From the end of May to mid June 2022, more than 200 forest fires in different districts of Khyber Pakhtunkhwa province of Pakistan damaged 14,430 acres of forests and pastures. While 402 incidents of forest fires were reported in one month, the highest number of 129 forest fires was reported in Abbottabad District. According to the report, forest fires broke out at 55 places in Mansehra District, 29 in Lakki Marwat District, 39 in Dera Ismail Khan District and 24 in Swat District.

== Haripur wildfire ==
On 16 May 2022, hundreds of acres of forest trees were uprooted and hundreds of large trees and shrubs were reduced to ashes in 70% of the forest area, in the hilly area of Makniyal in the Khanpur Tehsil of Haripur District, Khyber Pakhtunkhwa, Pakistan.

== Shangla District wildfire ==
On 4 June 2022, a forest fire broke out in Ali Jan Capri area of Chakesar, a remote area of Shangla District, Pakistan, as a result of which a girl, two children and a woman were burnt to death while collecting firewood.

Some people were also injured and shifted to Tehsil Headquarters Hospital Chakesar as rescue operation continued.
