= Dadu village fire =

2022 fire in Pakistan

- Date: 18 April 2022
- Time: 11:30 pm - 9:00 am
- Location: Mehar Tehsil, Dadu District, Pakistan
- Cause: Under investigation
- Deaths: 9
- Injuries: Dozens
- Property damage: 140 mud houses, 120 homes, and more than 160 cattle
- Inquiries: Joint Investigation Team formed by Deputy Inspector General of Hyderabad Police

On the night of 18 April 2022, more than 140 mud houses were burnt in a fire in an area of the Mehar Tehsil, in Dadu District, Pakistan. The fire killed nine people, including 8 children. A dozen other people were injured. The fire also killed more than 160 cattle and destroyed 120 homes. Prime Minister Shahbaz Sharif ordered a full investigation into the cause of the fire after an initial report. The cause of the fire was not immediately clear, but an investigation was under way.

== Background ==
The fire started at 11:30 pm on Monday night and continued till 9:00 am on Tuesday, villagers said. The blaze killed nine people, including eight children and a woman, and injured dozens, who were taken to hospitals in Larkana and Mehr Town. The blaze completely destroyed about 120 homes.

== Investigation ==
The heirs of the fire victims have demanded an investigation into the horrific fire. Sindh Chief Minister Murad Ali Shah directed to investigate the incidents of fire. A committee headed by Home Secretary was formed. Prime Minister Shahbaz Sharif also ordered a full investigation into the cause of the fire after an initial report.

In addition, Deputy Inspector General of Hyderabad Police Peer Muhammad Shah has also formed a Joint Investigation Team (JIT) to investigate the incident.

== Reactions ==
- On the direction of Prime Minister Shahbaz Sharif, financial assistance was released for the victims of Faiz Muhammad Daryani Chandio village affected by fire and has released Rs. 1 crore for the families of the deceased and the injured. He has also directed the district administration of Dadu District to provide all possible assistance till the rehabilitation of the victims and said that no negligence should be taken in the treatment of the injured.
- Sindh Chief Minister Murad Ali Shah admitted that he believed that the response was slow to fire broke out in Dadu, but those responsible for delay in relief work would be punished.
