= March 2022 Quetta bombing =

IED attack in Balochistan, Pakistan

- Location: Fatima Jinnah Road, Quetta, Balochistan, Pakistan
- Date: 2 March 2022; Approximately 7:00pm (PKT)
- Target: Police mobile
- Attack type: Bombing
- Deaths: 3
- Injuries: 25

At about 7pm on 2 March 2022, a bomb exploded near a police mobile on Fatima Jinnah Road in Quetta, Balochistan, Pakistan. It killed three people and injured 25 others, leaving six of them in critical condition.
