= 2022 Swat bombing =

2022 terrorist act

- Location: Swat district, Khyber Pakhtunkhwa, Pakistan
- Date: 13 September 2022
- Target: Civilians
- Attack type: Bombing
- Weapon: Explosives
- Deaths: 5
- Perpetrator: Tehreek-e-Taliban Pakistan (claimed responsibility)

On 13 September 2022, five people, including the former head of the Peace Committee and two policemen, were killed in a bomb blast in Swat district of Khyber Pakhtunkhwa. In a statement, the Tehreek-e-Taliban Pakistan has accepted the responsibility for the blast, but the authorities have not yet confirmed this claim.

The Chief Minister of Khyber Pakhtunkhwa in a statement condemned the blast and said that the sacrifices of those who lost their lives will not go in vain.

== Background ==
Swat, located around 240 kilometres (150 miles) from Islamabad, was a significant TTP stronghold until operation rahe rast in 2009, when the Pakistani military drove the armed group's militants out.

The new uptick in violence comes after peace negotiations between Pakistan's security services and the TTP failed to produce any results.

With the Taliban's ascension to power in Afghanistan, however, the organization launched peace discussions and ceasefire negotiations with the government, clearing the path for the group to re-establish its influence in the region.

== Attack ==
A roadside bomb assault, according the police, targeted the car of Idrees Khan, the ex-Village Defence Council (Aman Committee) Chairman of Kabal Tehsil in Swat.

According to authorities, the targeted attack murdered five persons, including a peace committee member, two police officers, and his personal guards.

Khan was a local elder who had previously led a tribal group battling the TTP in Swat.

== Aftermath ==
On October 11, 2022 local of swat valley held a mass demonstration against a militant attack on a school van, resulting in the driver's death and injuries to students. The federal cabinet expressed concern over the incident and condemned the regrouping of militants. Prime Minister Shehbaz Sharif chaired the meeting, expressing sympathy for the victims. Protesters demanded the attackers' arrest, ending their sit-in after negotiations with officials. Political figures like Aimal Wali Khan and Mushtaq Ahmad Khan joined the protest. The attack followed Malala Yousafzai's attack anniversary in Swat.
