= 2022 Islamabad suicide attack =

2022 Islamabad area suicide attack
- Location: I-10 area, Islamabad, Pakistan
- Date: 23 December 2022
- Target: Police
- Attack type: Suicide attack
- Weapon: Explosives
- Deaths: At least 1 policeman
- Injuries: Several
- Motive: Unknown

On 23 December 2022, at least one policeman was killed and several others injured in a suicide attack in Islamabad's sector I-10. The reason for the attack is still unclear.

After the explosion, the law enforcement agency cordoned off the area.
