= Pakistan Tehreek-e-Insaf =

Political party in Pakistan

Pakistan Tehreek-e-Insaf پاکستان تحريکِ انصاف Pakistan Movement for Justice
- Abbreviation: PTI
- President: Parvez Elahi
- Chairman: Gohar Ali Khan
- Secretary-General: Salman Akram Raja
- Spokesperson: Sheikh Waqas Akram
- Vice Chairman: Shah Mahmood Qureshi
- Founder: Imran Khan
- Founded: 25 April 1996 (30 years ago)
- Headquarters: Sector G-6/4; Islamabad-44000, ICT
- Student wing: Insaf Student Federation
- Youth wing: Insaf Youth Wing
- Women's wing: Insaf Women Wing
- Research Wing: Insaf Research Wing
- Membership (2012): 10 million
- Ideology: Populism; Secularism; Big tent
- Political position: Centre
- National affiliation: Tehreek Tahafuz Ayin
- Colors: Green; Red
- Slogan: Change the system — change Pakistan
- Senate: 14 / 95
- Sindh Assembly: 5 / 168

Party flag

Website
- www.insaf.pk

The Pakistan Tehreek-e-Insaf (PTI) (Note: Urdu: پاکستان تحريکِ انصاف, lit. 'Pakistan Movement for Justice') is a political party in Pakistan established in 1996 by cricketer and politician Imran Khan, who served as the country's prime minister from 2018 to 2022. The party has been led by Gohar Ali Khan since late 2023. It ranks among the three major Pakistani political parties alongside the Pakistan Muslim League–Nawaz (PML–N) and the Pakistan People's Party (PPP).

PTI failed to win a single seat in the 1997 general election and won only one seat in the 2002 general election, which was secured by Khan himself. From 1999 to 2007, the PTI supported the presidency of General Pervez Musharraf. It later rose in opposition to Musharraf in 2007 and also boycotted the 2008 general election, accusing it of having been conducted with fraudulent procedures under Musharraf's rule. The global popularity of the "Third Way" during the Musharraf era led to the rise of a new Pakistani political bloc focused on centrism, deviating from the traditional dominance of the centre-left PPP and the centre-right PML–N. When the PML–Q began to decline in the aftermath of Musharraf's presidency, much of its centrist voter bank was lost to the PTI. Around the same time, the PPP's popularity began to decrease after the disqualification of Yusuf Raza Gillani in 2012. With a claimed membership of over 10 million in Pakistan in 2012, the PTI appealed to many former PPP voters, particularly in the provinces of Punjab and Khyber Pakhtunkhwa, due to its outlook on populism.

In the 2013 general election, the PTI emerged as a major party with over 7.5 million votes, ranking second by number of votes and third by number of seats won. At the provincial level, it was voted to power in Khyber Pakhtunkhwa. During its time in opposition, the PTI, with the help of popular slogans such as Tabdeeli Arahi Hai (lit. 'change is coming'), mobilized people in rallies over public distress on various national issues, the most notable of which was the 2014 Azadi march. In the 2018 general election, it received 16.9 million votes—the largest amount for any political party in Pakistan thus far. It became the largest party in terms of representation in the National Assembly of Pakistan since the 2018 general election and then formed the national government in coalition with five other parties for the first time, with Khan serving as the new Pakistani prime minister. However, in April 2022, a no-confidence motion against Khan removed him and his PTI government from office at the federal level.

Officially, the PTI has stated that its focus is on turning Pakistan into a model welfare state espousing Islamic socialism, and also on dismantling religious discrimination against Pakistani minorities. The PTI terms itself an anti–status quo movement advocating an Islamic democracy centred on egalitarianism. It claims to be the only non-dynastic party of mainstream Pakistani politics in contrast to parties such as the PPP and PML–N. Since 2019, the party has been criticized by political opponents and analysts alike for its failures to address various economic and political issues, particularly the Pakistani economy, which was further weakened in light of the COVID-19 pandemic. However, Khan's government was later praised for leading the country's pandemic recovery in its later stages. During its time in power, the party faced backlash over its crackdown on the Pakistani opposition as well as its regulation of increased censorship through curbs on Pakistani media outlets and freedom of speech.

The party faced a crackdown following the May 9 riots, with arrests, detention and the resignation of party leaders, while the government claimed that this action was a necessary response to the violence, vandalism, and arson allegedly carried out by PTI officeholders and supporters. On 2 December 2023, Gohar Ali Khan was elected unopposed as the Chairman of the PTI. Imran Khan nominated him for the position of the new chairman of the PTI.

== History ==
=== Foundation and early years ===
Pakistan Tehreek-e-Insaf (PTI) was founded by Imran Khan on 25 April 1996 in Lahore. PTI was conceived when Khan discussed forming a political party at the home of Dr. Nausherwan Burki, head of the Shaukat Khanum Memorial Hospital (SKMH). Those involved included Pervez Hasan, a lawyer and SKMH board member; Naeemul Haq, Khan's former bank manager and close associate; Abdul Hafeez Khan, a Pakistani expatriate businessman; and Ahsan Rashid, a former oil company executive and SKMH fundraiser in Saudi Arabia. Later that day, Hamid Khan, a constitutional lawyer, was approached and joined the party. Khan cited frustration with government corruption and restrictions placed by Benazir Bhutto's government on his philanthropic activities as reasons for entering politics. Although Khan instructed that SKMH fundraising be kept separate from PTI, many founding members were donors or fundraisers for the hospital, and the party's early culture reflected its philanthropic origins.

Among the party's founding members were Akbar S. Babar, Arif Alvi, Asad Qaiser, Imran Ismail, Omar Sarfraz Cheema, Najeeb Haroon, Haji Nazim, and Dawa Khan Sabir. Aamir Mehmood Kiani, Faisal Javed, and Shadab H. Jafri also joined the party in 1996. Early women members included Fauzia Kasuri, an SKMH fundraiser in the United States, and Saloni Bokhari, a Lahori businesswoman and SKMH donor, both of whom are considered among the party's founding members; and Sadiqa Sahibdad Khan, a philanthropist and Hamid Khan's sister-in-law. Alvi was regarded as one of the authors of the party's constitution, and Hamid Khan was a leading intellectual influence on the party before 2011.

The party's early constitutional documents expressed commitments to social democracy, constitutionalism, political decentralisation, and the rule of law. Some critics alleged that PTI was an establishment party created by Pakistan's Inter-Services Intelligence to bolster the state's national security narrative by legitimising jihadi groups and mainstreaming extremism.

From 1996 to 2002, PTI lacked a large activist base and meaningful internal competition. The party performed poorly in the 1997 and 2002 general elections, winning only Imran Khan's seat from Mianwali in both contests.

=== Reorganisation and rise (2007–2011) ===
The Lawyers' Movement, the pro-democracy mobilisation following General Pervez Musharraf's 2007 Pakistani state of emergency, the decline of the Pakistan Muslim League-Quaid (PML-Q), and disillusionment among Pakistan Peoples Party (PPP) workers with Zardari's leadership contributed to an influx of workers and leaders into PTI. During this period, PTI workers, particularly students from its student wing, the Insaf Students Federation (ISF), regularly participated in Lawyers' Movement rallies while carrying PTI flags, increasing the party's public visibility. From around 2007, PTI began attracting professional politicians from both right- and left-wing parties, including some prominent leaders of Jamaat-e-Islami and a gradual inflow of student activists from its student wing, Islami Jamiat-e-Talaba, increasing its capacity to function as a catch-all party.

PTI boycotted the 2008 Pakistani general elections after Musharraf refused to step down as president. According to the columnist Nadeem F. Paracha, the party during this period was "merely drifting as a more good-looking B team of Jamaat-e-Islami". Between 2008 and 2011, former members of the PML-Q and disillusioned PPP workers in Punjab also began joining PTI. High-profile entrants included Jahangir Tareen and Aleem Khan, former ministers under Musharraf, who joined in 2011 before the October rally at Minar-e-Pakistan. In order to join PTI, Tareen resigned from the National Assembly of Pakistan, stating that his political vision aligned with that of party chairman Imran Khan. He emerged as one of the party's most prominent financiers and organisers and was described by Herald as PTI's "money man", citing his central role in funding party activities, protests, and election campaigns.

PTI operated largely as a bottom-up movement driven by activists and new political entrants, with limited reliance on traditional constituency networks in the period leading up to the October 2011 Lahore rally. The party mobilised support through expatriate fundraising, particularly from Pakistanis in the United States and United Kingdom, online membership registration and SMS-based enrolment, and the use of digital communication platforms such as SMSALL.PK. These organisational strategies contributed to the success of PTI's October 2011 Lahore rally. The party gained national prominence after the rally, which was attended by an estimated 100,000 supporters, and began to be viewed as a viable political force. The rally's format and aesthetics later became a template for PTI rallies and were subsequently adopted in the party's protests after 2013.

Shah Mehmood Qureshi joined the party in 2012, followed by veteran PML-N leader Javed Hashmi later that year. In March 2012, PTI's Central Executive Committee appointed Hashmi as the party's president.

=== 2013 intra-party elections ===
Tensions between long-standing members and new entrants were already evident in 2012, leading the party to pursue intraparty elections as a means of resolving internal conflict. Under its party manifesto, PTI is required to hold intra-party elections every four years; however, no such elections were held for nearly eleven years, and the party was identified by the Election Commission of Pakistan in January 2013 as having failed to conduct intra-party elections within the prescribed timeframe ahead of the general elections. In January and February 2013, PTI held intraparty elections across Punjab and in parts of Khyber Pakhtunkhwa, allowing members registered via SMS to vote either electronically or at local polling booths. Elections were conducted from the union council level up to the central council, with Hamid Khan serving as election commissioner and the party's lawyers' wing assisting in administration.

Following these polls, Imran Khan was elected chairperson unopposed in March 2013, as no other party official filed nomination papers to contest the position. Khan stated that the party would impose a two-term limit on its chairperson and that he would not serve as a lifetime party head, saying that such practices were inconsistent with democratic norms. While the elections increased factional conflict and weakened PTI's constituency campaigns in the 2013 general elections, their longer-term impact saw former PML-Q leaders Jahangir Tareen and Aleem Khan gain influence sidelining the party's old guard. Naz Baloch, previously information secretary of the party's women's wing, was elected central vice president. In the Punjab chapter elections, Ejaz Chaudhry was elected president of PTI Punjab, and Yasmin Rashid was elected the party's provincial general secretary. In June 2013, former PTI women's wing leader Fauzia Kasuri resigned from the party, alleging that the intra-party elections had not been conducted fairly and accusing the party's election commissioner, Hamid Khan, of preventing her from contesting. PTI rejected these claims, stating that the elections were held on 21 March 2013 and that Kasuri had relinquished her US citizenship after the polls, affecting her eligibility to contest.

In December 2013, Imran Khan constituted an election tribunal headed by Wajihuddin Ahmed to address internal complaints regarding the intra-party elections. In October 2014, the tribunal ordered the dissolution of party bodies and the holding of fresh elections. Reports by the commission headed by Tasneem Noorani and the Justice (retd.) Wajihuddin Ahmed Election Tribunal confirmed manipulation of the intraparty elections. Wajihuddin stated that "buckets of money" had been poured into the intra-party elections and concluded that several contests had been rigged. Wajihuddin recommended the expulsion of Tareen, Aleem Khan, Pervez Khattak, and Nadir Leghari for rigging the elections and unlawfully occupying party positions. In April 2015, Khan dissolved the tribunal after failing to implement its directives, leading to a dispute between the party leadership and the tribunal. Despite pressure from party workers, Imran Khan declined to act on these recommendations, stating at a workers' convention that political leaders, like corporate executives, must rely on their own judgement; following this, grassroots workers began leaving the party in large numbers. Herald reported, citing PTI members, that a group within the party led by Tareen opposed the public release of the tribunal's report.

=== 2013 Pakistani general election ===
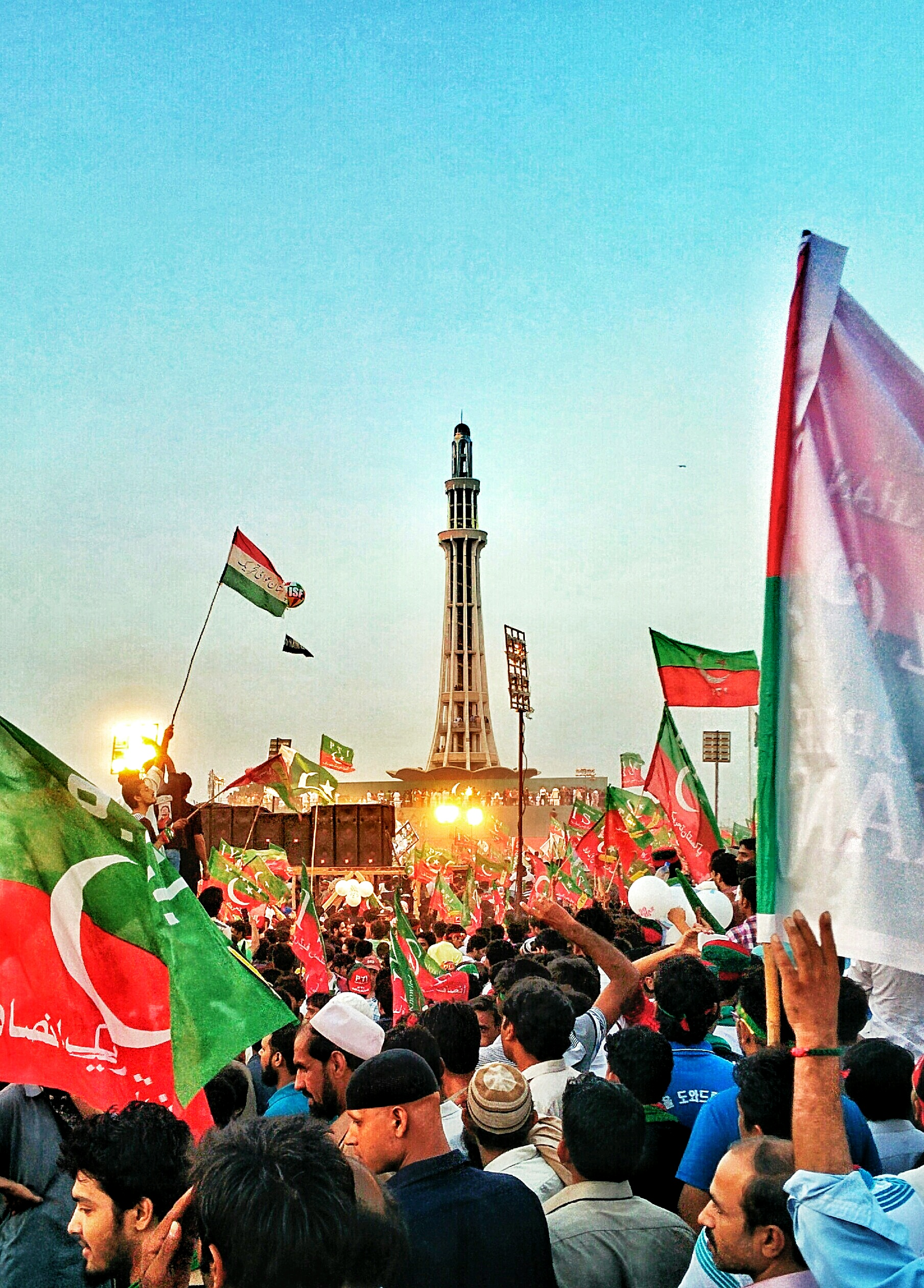
PTI rally in 2014 with the Pakistan Awami Tehreek (PAT) at the Minar-e-Pakistan

In April 2013, PTI unveiled a 13-point election manifesto that prioritised internal security and pledged "justice for all". The document proposed a sovereign foreign policy based on friendly relations with all countries, including India and the United States, and stated that a PTI government would seek to withdraw Pakistan from the United States-led war on terror while strengthening the National Counter Terrorism Authority with representation from military, intelligence, and civilian institutions. The manifesto also proposed debating Pakistan's defence budget in an in-camera session of parliament and outlined governance reforms including a whistleblower programme to report corruption, greater devolution of authority to municipal governments, and agricultural taxation on large landholdings.

PTI chief Imran Khan contested four National Assembly constituencies in the 2013 Pakistani general election. The party's campaign drew significant support from urban women and youth voters. PTI won 28 seats in the National Assembly. It emerged as the single largest party in Khyber Pakhtunkhwa after winning 59 seats, formed the provincial government with coalition support, and emerged as the third-largest party nationally. The PTI-led Pervez Khattak Administration presented a balanced, tax-free budget for the fiscal year 2013–14, and introduced the Sehat Sahulat (Sehat Insaf Card) health insurance programme. In November 2013, Khan directed Khattak to end the party's alliance with the Qaumi Watan Party (QWP) due to its failure to take action against its ministers over corruption, including Bakht Baidar and Ibrar Hussain.

Following the elections, Jahangir Tareen's presence in PTI's senior leadership highlighted internal divisions within the party. According to Herald, his growing prominence highlighted a divide between party members who prioritised ideological mobilisation and those who held the view that electoral success required greater reliance on wealthy and influential candidates. Tareen was widely perceived as representing the latter group.

A year after the elections, on 11 May 2014, PTI alleged that the 2013 general elections had been massively rigged. On 14 August 2014, PTI organised the Azadi March from Lahore towards Islamabad, during which the party demanded Prime Minister Nawaz Sharif's resignation. Javed Hashmi left the party in September 2014 after accusing Khan of colluding with Tahir-ul-Qadri and elements of the military establishment against Sharif. In March 2015, PTI entered into an agreement with the Sharif administration to establish a judicial commission to inquire into allegations of rigging.

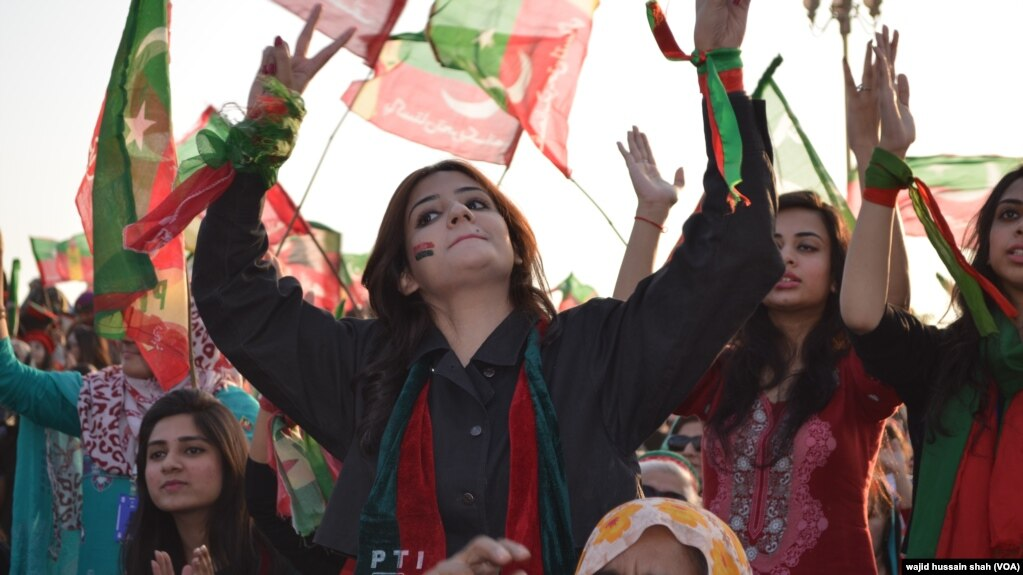
PTI women activists and supporters in 2015

In August 2015, PTI chairman Imran Khan suspended Wajihuddin Ahmed's basic party membership after he publicly discussed internal party matters, amid differences over the implementation of recommendations made by the party's election tribunal on the 2013 intra-party elections. In September 2015, a group of PTI founding members led by Akbar S. Babar issued a show-cause notice to Imran Khan, alleging corruption, nepotism, and mismanagement within the party, including the refusal to conduct an independent audit of party funds and failure to act on findings related to irregularities in the intra-party elections. PTI election commissioner Tasneem Noorani resigned in 2016 after Khan declined to hold elections for the party's national leadership. Khan dissolved PTI's organisational structure, and party bodies at all levels were subsequently appointed by Khan and his associates rather than elected. Wajihuddin resigned from PTI in September 2016.

In June 2016, PTI suspended the basic membership of Mufti Abdul Qawi after a controversy erupted over selfies and videos he took with the model Qandeel Baloch.

In late 2016, PTI dissolved its organisational structure in Khyber Pakhtunkhwa and postponed intra-party elections in the province. To manage party affairs on an interim basis, PTI divided Khyber Pakhtunkhwa into four regions and appointed interim regional heads. Provincial Minister for Public Health Engineering Shah Farman was assigned to the Peshawar zone, Minister for Revenue Ali Amin Gandapur to the southern zone, Minister for Tourism Mahmood Khan to the Malakand zone, and Zar Gul Khan to the Hazara region.

Following the Panama Papers leak, PTI filed a petition in the Supreme Court in late 2016, seeking an investigation into corruption allegations against the Sharif family. The court disqualified Sharif from holding public office, after which he resigned as prime minister.

In July 2017, Naz Baloch left PTI for the PPP, citing the marginalisation of women and youth. In August 2017, PTI Member of the National Assembly Ayesha Gulalai accused Khan and his close associates of disrespecting women and party workers.

=== 2017 intra-party elections ===
According to its constitution, PTI was required to hold intra-party elections by March 2017. In May 2017, Imran Khan announced that the elections would be held on 11 June 2017 under the newly appointed election commissioner, Azam Swati. The announcement followed directives from the Election Commission of Pakistan instructing provincial authorities not to allot PTI its electoral symbol, the "cricket bat", in by-elections due to the party's failure to hold the polls.

During the 2017 intra-party elections, 256,957 of approximately 2.7 million registered party workers cast their votes over a two-day polling process, representing a turnout of 10.4 percent.

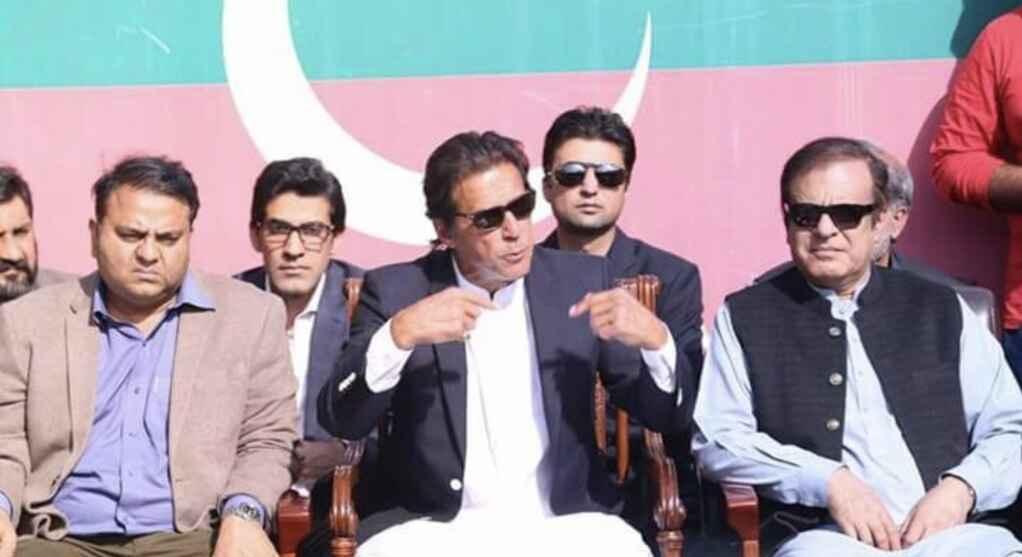
Party press conference featuring Fawad Chaudhry, Imran Khan, Murad Saeed, and Shibli Faraz in February 2018

Imran Khan was re-elected as chairman. The following individuals were elected to other key party offices:

- PTI vice chairman: Shah Mahmood Qureshi
- PTI secretary-general: Jahangir Tareen
- Central Punjab president: Aleem Khan
- Sindh chapter president: Arif Alvi
- Balochistan chapter president: Yar Muhammad Rind
- Khyber Pakhtunkhwa south president: Ali Amin Gandapur

=== 2018 election and post-election period ===
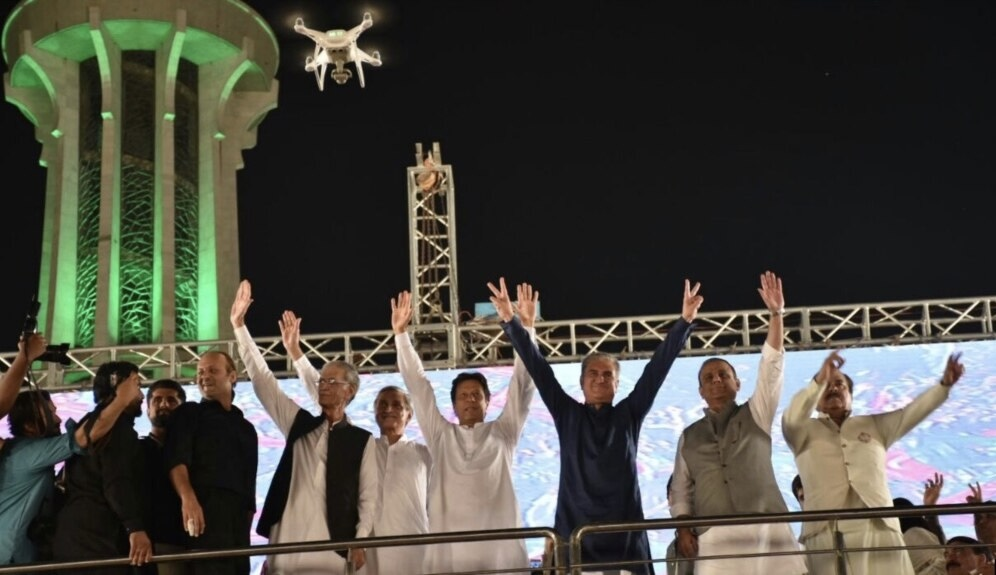
Party leaders (left to right) Pervez Khattak, Jahangir Tareen, Imran Khan, Aleem Khan and Naeemul Haque in the 2018 election campaign on the Minar-e-Pakistan

In the run-up to the 2018 Pakistani general election PTI was accused of facilitating the judicial disqualification of Prime Minister Nawaz Sharif and of siding with the judiciary and military establishment against media organisations critical of military influence. In 2018, Fauzia Kasuri published an opinion article criticising PTI's departure from its original ideology, accusing the party of fostering a cult of personality, mobilising its youth against internal dissent, and warning of growing influence by unseen power brokers; the article marked her departure after nearly two decades of association with the party.

In May 2018, PTI announced a 100-day agenda to be implemented if the party was elected to power. The agenda outlined commitments including the merger of the Federally Administered Tribal Areas (FATA) into Khyber Pakhtunkhwa, the creation of a new province in Southern Punjab, a political reconciliation process in Balochistan, and measures to improve law and order and civic conditions in Karachi. It also focused on reforms in governance, economic growth, agriculture, social services, and national security. PTI campaigned on a populist and anti-corruption platform. The election was widely seen as a contest between PTI and the Pakistan Muslim League (N). The party's campaign prominently featured the slogan Naya Pakistan (New Pakistan), as outlined in its manifesto. However, while promoting the idea of a "New Pakistan", PTI relied electorally on alliances with established power centres, including right-wing religious parties, electables, business interests, and the military establishment.

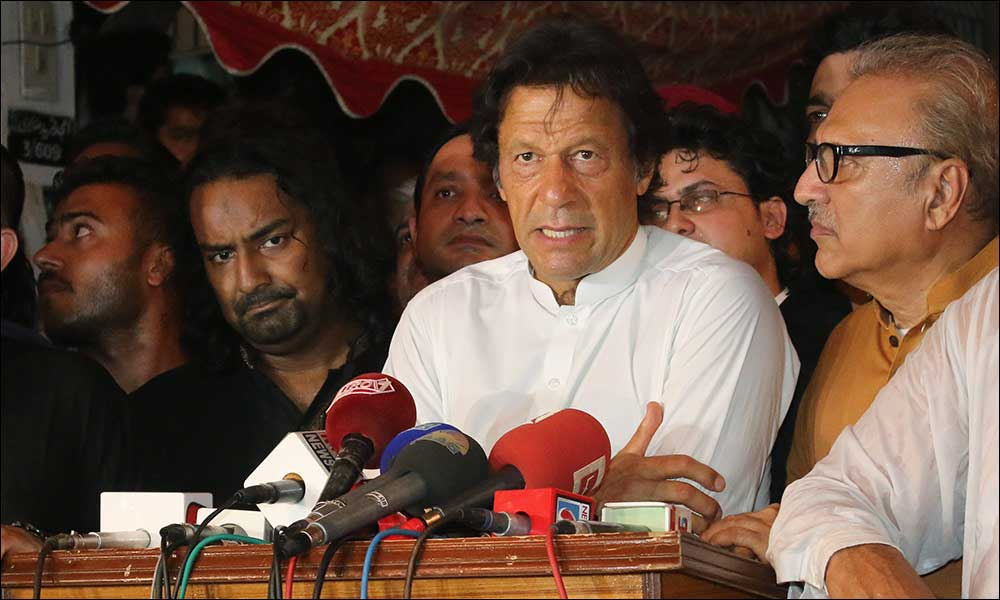
PTI's 2018 election campaign trail, with Imran Khan seen with President candidate Arif Alvi. Top party members Faisal Javed and Khurrum Sher Zaman can also be seen.

The party won 116 of the 270 directly contested National Assembly seats, emerging as the largest party in Parliament, and its total seat count rose to 125 after nine independent MNAs-elect joined PTI. Following the allocation of 28 reserved seats for women and five for minorities, PTI's strength in the 342-member National Assembly reached 158 seats, increasing its overall representation from 31 seats in 2013 to 158 seats in 2018. PTI was able to lead a coalition government, marking its first successful bid for power at the federal level. Following the election, opposition parties, particularly the PML-N, alleged vote rigging and electoral irregularities, arguing that PTI benefited from an army-engineered lack of a level playing field. PTI nominated Imran Khan as its candidate for prime minister. After forming government, a significant portion of PTI's cabinet consisted of former ministers from the PML-Q and PPP. The PTI government launched an austerity drive soon after coming to power in an effort to address Pakistan's financial difficulties.

The 15th National Assembly of Pakistan, under a PTI majority (red) in 2018

In 2019, Buzdar provincial government saw the resignations of Senior Minister Aleem Khan and Minister Sibtain Khan after both were arrested by the National Accountability Bureau (NAB) on corruption-related charges. In December 2019, PTI suspended the basic party membership of Hamid Khan and issued him a show cause notice for "defaming and maligning" the party. Senior PTI ministers in the Mahmood Khan provincial government, Atif Khan, Shakeel Ahmad and Shahram Khan Tarakai, were removed from the cabinet in January 2020 amid allegations that they were attempting to form a forward bloc and undermine Chief Minister Mahmood Khan, a move approved by Prime Minister Khan.

In February 2021, a show-cause notice was issued to party member Liaquat Ali Jatoi after he made allegations of corruption against the party leadership regarding the allocation of Senate election tickets. In March 2021, Aslam Abro and Shahar Yar Khan Shar were expelled from the party for violating the party's instructions during the Senate polls, and their basic party memberships were subsequently cancelled. It was reported that both had accused the party leadership and voted against the party's candidates for Senate seats in Sindh.

=== Post-government period (2022–present) ===
On 22 May 2022, PTI chairman Imran Khan announced that his party would launch a long march towards Islamabad starting on 25 May 2022. Police conducted raids on the residences of PTI leaders and workers across the country and arrested at least 150 party members.

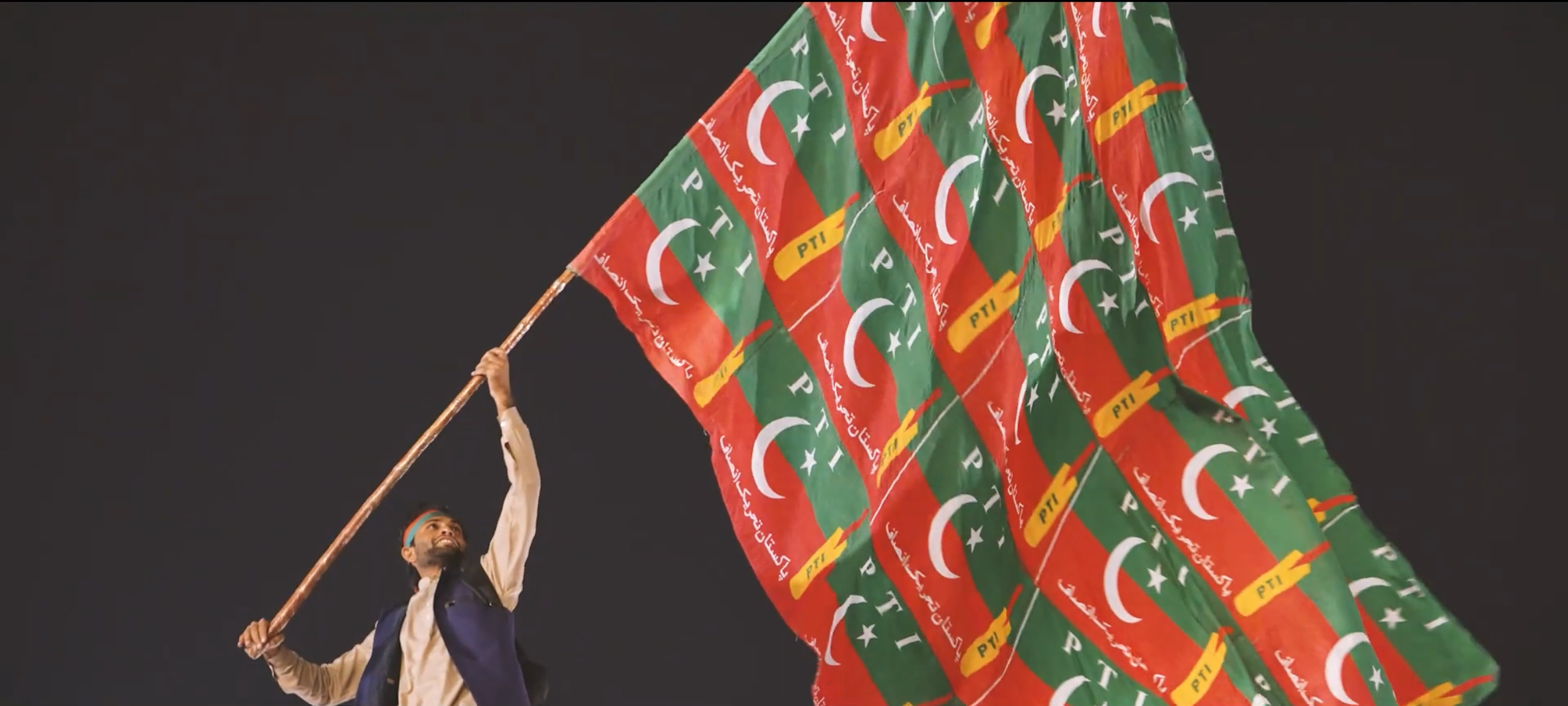
Worker displays the party's flag in November 2022.

In October 2022, Faisal Vawda's party membership was terminated over his contentious press conference.

==== 2023 expansion ====
In February 2023, Parvez Elahi joined PTI along with ten former MPAs of the Pakistan Muslim League (Q) (PML (Q)). On 7 March 2023, Elahi was appointed as the President of PTI. On 19 March 2023, Ijaz-ul-Haq, the leader of the Pakistan Muslim League (Z), announced that he had joined the PTI.

==== May 9 riots and crackdown ====
Party Chairman Imran Khan speaks on the riots.

On 9 May 2023, after the arrest of Imran Khan, the leader of the PTI, from the Islamabad High Court grounds, nationwide demonstrations by PTI supporters turned into violent riots. PTI workers and members caused incidents of vandalism, looting, and arson, resulting in Rs. 1.98 billion in damages to government and military facilities. Punjab Police, using geo-fencing reports, alleged that Imran Khan and key PTI leaders coordinated efforts to incite attacks on the residence of the Lahore corps commander and other sensitive locations. Police reported over 400 calls made by PTI leaders, including Khan, instructing rioters to target these areas. Inspector General of Police Punjab Dr. Usman Anwar confirmed the use of geo-fencing to trace these communications, naming Khan as a prime suspect in orchestrating the attacks. Other PTI leaders involved included Hammad Azhar, Yasmin Rashid, Mehmood-ur-Rasheed, Ejaz Chaudhary, Mian Aslam Iqbal, and Murad Raas, all of whom were reportedly in contact with the rioters and issued specific instructions for the attacks, while PTI has denied these claims and alleged that government agencies were behind the riots. Furthermore, PTI has alleged that the May 9 riots were a "false flag operation" designed by the Pakistan Armed Forces and The Establishment to destroy and crackdown on the party as well as to arbitrarily arrest party leadership.

A detailed order from Anti-Terrorism Court Judge Khalid Arshad implicated PTI's founder, Imran Khan, in orchestrating attacks on military installations, government properties, and police officials. The order revealed that Khan had instructed PTI leaders to create chaos and exert pressure for his release if arrested, as testified by two prosecution witnesses. The court order described a meeting held on 7 May 2023, where Khan allegedly directed PTI leaders to prepare for potential unrest on May 9, should he be detained. He purportedly warned through a video message of a scenario akin to Sri Lanka's unrest; if he were to be arrested, encouraging party workers to engage in what he termed a "real jihad for real freedom." The prosecution suggested that Khan orchestrated a criminal conspiracy, rallying top PTI leadership to incite actions that culminated in the attack and arson of the Jinnah House (Corp Commander House, Lahore), aiming to intimidate the government.

After the riots, a crackdown was initiated by government of Shehbaz Sharif against PTI leaders and workers, with thousands arrested. PTI revealed evidence suggesting that PTI workers and party members were harassed, and unlawfully arrested. PTI leaders were forced to quit party/party positions in televised press conferences. Businesses of PTI leaders who did not quit the party were sealed. A crackdown was also initiated on vocal women supporters of PTI - the most prominent of which was Khadija Shah, a businesswoman and granddaughter of former Pakistani Army Chief, Asif Nawaz Janjua.

==== Party resignations, terminations, and expulsions (2023) ====
From May 2023 to August 2023, PTI faced a wave of resignations, as well as terminations and expulsions resulting from internal disciplinary actions.

In July 2023, PTI terminated the basic membership of twenty-two former lawmakers and party members from Khyber Pakhtunkhwa, including former Chief Minister of Khyber Pakhtunkhwa Mahmood Khan.

On 2 August 2023, PTI terminated basic party membership of twenty-two party leaders from South Punjab due to party policy violations, including its former Chief Minister of Punjab, Usman Buzdar.

On 8 August 2023, Dewan Sachanand was expelled from the PTI for violating party discipline when he voted for Rana Ansar, a member of the Muttahida Qaumi Movement – Pakistan (MQM-P), to become the Leader of the Opposition in the Provincial Assembly.

Details of other notable PTI leaders who exited the party through resignation, termination, or expulsion during this period:

Name	Date membership ended	Mode	Stated cause	Ref.
Hisham Inamullah Khan	May 2023	Resigned	Resigned following the May 9 violence	
Usman Khan Tarakai	May 2023	Resigned	Resigned following the May 9 violence	
Syed Zulfiqar Ali Shah	May 2023	Resigned	Resigned following the May 9 violence	
Chaudhry Wajahat Hussain	May 2023	Resigned	Resigned following the May 9 violence	
Aftab Siddiqui	May 2023	Resigned	Resigned following the May 9 violence	
Dost Muhammad Mazari	May 2023	Resigned	Resigned following the May 9 violence	
Faiz Ullah Kamoka	May 2023	Resigned	Resigned following the May 9 violence	
Mahmood Moulvi	May 2023	Resigned	Resigned following the May 9 violence	
Shireen Mazari	May 2023	Resigned	Resigned following the May 9 violence	
Muhammad Ishtiaq Urmar	July 2023	Terminated	Party policy violations	
Muhammad Iqbal Wazir	July 2023	Terminated	Party policy violations	
Muhib Ullah Khan	July 2023	Terminated	Party policy violations	
Syed Ghazi Ghazan Jamal Orakzai	July 2023	Terminated	Party policy violations	
Aghaz Ikramullah Gandapur	July 2023	Terminated	Party policy violations	
Ahmed Hussain Shah	July 2023	Terminated	Party policy violations	
Ehtesham Javed Akber Khan	July 2023	Terminated	Party policy violations	
Ibrahim Khattak	July 2023	Terminated	Party policy violations	
Muhammad Deedar	July 2023	Terminated	Party policy violations	
Shafiq Afridi	July 2023	Terminated	Party policy violations	
Mufti Ubaid ur Rahman	July 2023	Terminated	Party policy violations	
Saleh Muhammad Khan	July 2023	Terminated	Party policy violations	
Zia Ullah Khan Bangash	July 2023	Terminated	Party policy violations	
Zahoor Shakir	July 2023	Terminated	Party policy violations	
Wilson Wazir	July 2023	Terminated	Party policy violations	
Iqbal Mian	July 2023	Terminated	Party policy violations	
Shah Faisal Khan	July 2023	Terminated	Party policy violations	
Shaukat Ali Yousafzai	July 2023	Terminated	Party policy violations	
Sher Akbar Khan	July 2023	Terminated	Party policy violations	
Nadeem Khayal	July 2023	Terminated	Party policy violations	
Sardar Muhammad Khan Laghari	August 2023	Terminated	Violation of party policy	
Sabeen Gul Khan	August 2023	Terminated	Violation of party policy	
Khusro Bakhtiar	August 2023	Terminated	Violation of party policy	
Mian Shafi Muhammad	August 2023	Terminated	Violation of party policy	
Syed Muhammad Asghar Shah	August 2023	Terminated	Violation of party policy	
Mian Tariq Abdullah	August 2023	Terminated	Violation of party policy	
Muhammad Akhtar Malik	August 2023	Terminated	Violation of party policy	
Muhammad Afzal Chaudhry	August 2023	Terminated	Violation of party policy	
Ehsan-ul-Haque Chaudhry	August 2023	Terminated	Violation of party policy	
Javed Akhtar Ansari	August 2023	Terminated	Violation of party policy	
Muhammad Saleem Akhtar	August 2023	Terminated	Violation of party policy	
Muhammad Zaheer ud Din Khan Alizai	August 2023	Terminated	Violation of party policy	
Muhammad Farooq Azam Malik	August 2023	Terminated	Violation of party policy	
Raja Riaz	August 2023	Expelled	Violation of party policy	
Noor Alam Khan	August 2023	Expelled	Violation of party policy	
Ramesh Kumar Vankwani	August 2023	Expelled	Violation of party policy	
Nuzhat Pathan	August 2023	Expelled	Violation of party policy	
Wajiha Qamar	August 2023	Expelled	Violation of party policy	
Sardar Riaz Mehmood Khan Mazari	August 2023	Expelled	Violation of party policy	
Rana Muhammad Qasim Noon	August 2023	Expelled	Violation of party policy	
Malik Nawab Sher Waseer	August 2023	Expelled	Violation of party policy	
Syed Basit Sultan Bukhari	August 2023	Expelled	Violation of party policy	
Muhammad Afzal Khan Dhandla	August 2023	Expelled	Violation of party policy	
Abdul Ghaffar Wattoo	August 2023	Expelled	Violation of party policy	
Sardar Aamir Talal Khan Gopang	August 2023	Expelled	Violation of party policy	
Malik Ahmed Hussain Dehar	August 2023	Expelled	Violation of party policy	

==== 2024 election and post-election period (2024–Present) ====
After Arrest of Imran Khan, the PTI's leadership structure was significantly constrained ahead of the 2024 Pakistani general election, as Khan and vice chairman Shah Mahmood Qureshi were imprisoned. To meet the Election Commission's requirements and enable the party's participation in the elections, Gohar Ali Khan was elected unopposed as PTI chairman. Gohar described his appointment as temporary and said that he would step down once Imran Khan's conviction was overturned. Omar Ayub Khan was nominated by Imran Khan as the party's candidate for prime minister.

On 19 February 2024, PTI announced an alliance with the Sunni Ittehad Council (SIC) and Majlis Wahdat-e-Muslimeen (MWM). The alliance with SIC was aimed at enabling the PTI to claim its share of reserved seats in the national, Punjab and Khyber Pakhtunkhwa assemblies.

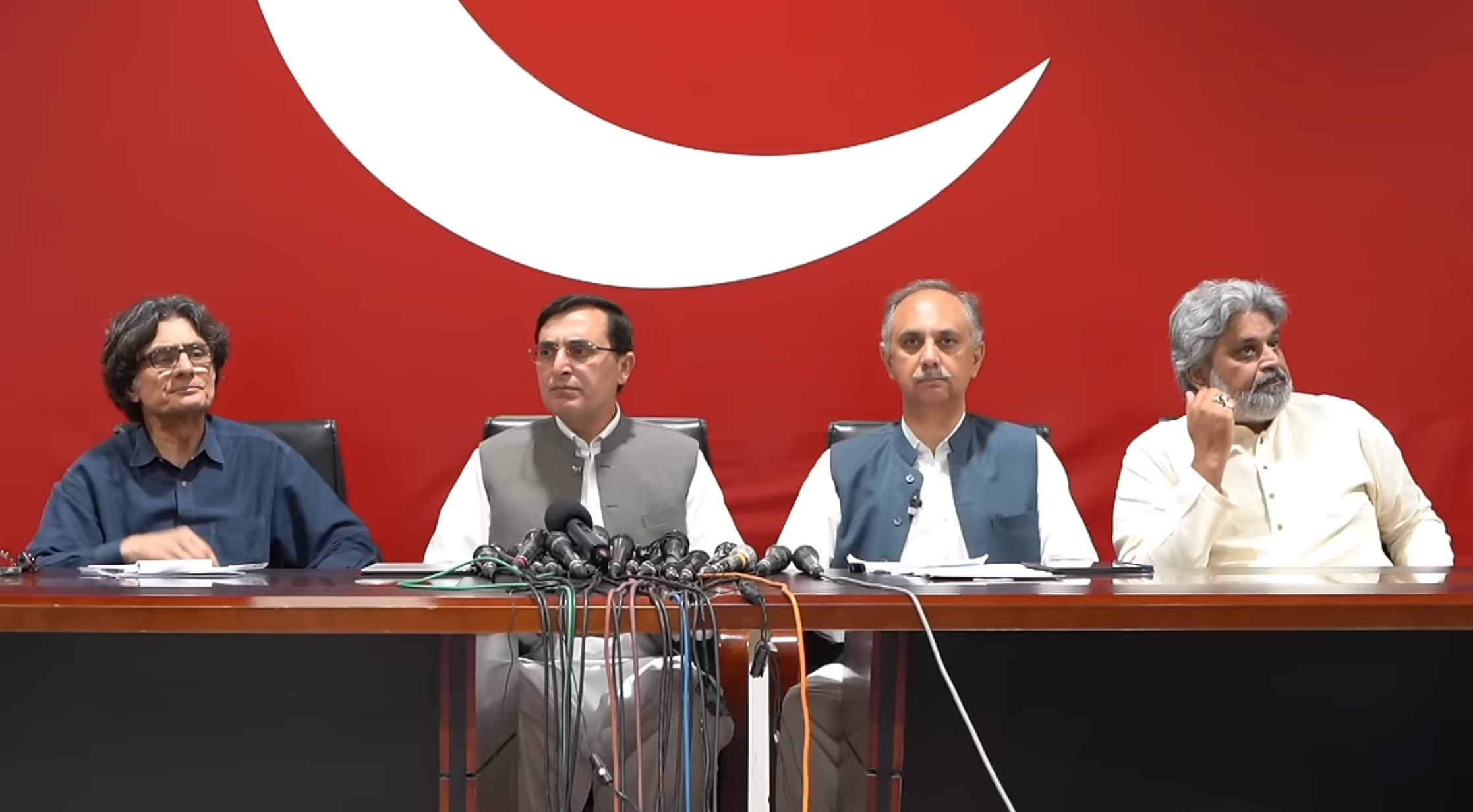
Top party leaders from left to right: Then-Information Secretary Raoof Hasan, Chairman Gohar Ali Khan, Then-Secretary General Omar Ayub with SIC leader Sahibzada Hamid Raza in April 2024

In December 2024, Salman Ahmad, a long-term member of the party, was expelled after publicly criticising Bushra Bibi, including describing her as "corrupt and greedy".

In February 2025, Imran Khan ordered the expulsion of lawmaker Sher Afzal Marwat for repeated breaches of party discipline. At a PTI rally, Marwat delivered a cryptic speech suggesting that "bad people" are useful in "bad times" while "good people" remain silent, and implied that the Khyber Pakhtunkhwa chief minister Ali Amin Gandapur would represent people like himself. These remarks prompted internal complaints and led to the revocation of his basic membership. Previously, he was issued a show-cause notice for his comments against Salman Akram Raja.

== Positions ==
PTI aimed to transform Pakistan into an Islamic state modelled on Riyasat-e-Madinah (State of Madina), described as an Islamic version of a welfare state intended to create a more equal society. According to the PTI's policy as described in 2018, the party planned to develop poverty reduction programmes, promote diverse livelihood options, improve the healthcare system, and strengthen educational system reforms.

=== Domestic ===
The PTI proposed civilian control of Pakistan's military. The Inter-Services Intelligence service would report directly to the Prime Minister of Pakistan, and the defence budget would be audited by the government. Imran Khan also pledged to resign should any terrorism take place from Pakistani soil following these reforms. PTI organised a protest against drone attacks in Pakistan on 23 November 2013 at Peshawar, where it called on the federal government to force an end to U.S. CIA drone attacks and to block NATO supplies through the country to Afghanistan. "We will put pressure on America, and our protest will continue if drone attacks are not stopped." The U.S. embassy declined to comment on the protest that also temporarily closed a route leading to one of two border crossings used for the shipments.

The PTI also raised issue of religious tolerance and greater representation for minorities. PTI promised to crack down on police brutality, restructure the civil service, reform the electoral system, allow for a truly independent judiciary, decentralise state power, and enforce laws which extend personal liberty. On 20 February 2013 PTI launched its 'Education Policy' with plans to introduce a uniform education system with one curriculum in three languages for Urdu, English and regional languages for the entire of Pakistan in primary schools. The PTI advocated the establishment of South Punjab and Gilgit Baltistan as formal provinces of Pakistan. The PTI is described as secular and centrist.

In the 2018 election, Imran Khan promises to bring a "Naya Pakistan" (new Pakistan). Following its rise to national government in Pakistan, the PTI backed off from certain commitments in its manifesto what was criticised by its opponents as U-turns. Dawn has found that the progress on some promises is still stuck in its initial stages or has been marred with delays.

=== Foreign policy ===
The PTI hopes to have a relationship with the US that would be based on "self-dignity and respect" and promised to stop all foreign aid to Pakistan. Imran Khan, the leader of PTI claimed "having relations with US, Russia and China is in Pakistan's interest" and Pakistan's "future is tied up with Russia". The PTI also promised to make the Kashmir issue a top priority and would try and solve the issue permanently so that Pakistan no longer has any border or territorial disputes with any of its neighbours.

== Organization and structure ==
=== Administration ===
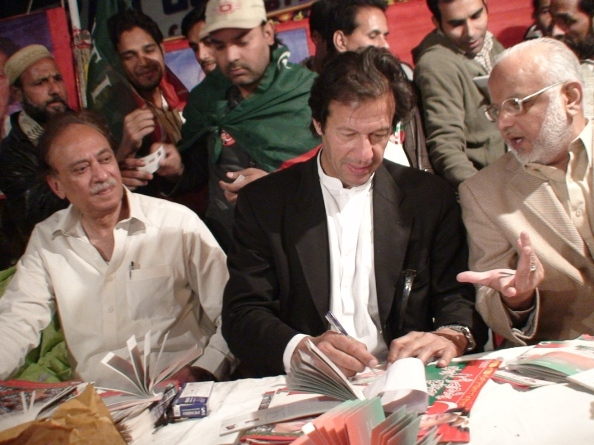
Then Vice-President Ejaz Chaudhary (right) with Imran Khan (centre) in the party's 2013 intra-party elections

The National Council serves as the governing body of the PTI. Its members include office bearers of provincial organizations, presidents of regional and district organizations, and five members nominated by various sectors such as women, youth, students, labour, farmers, minorities, lawyers, and overseas organizations. Additionally, advisors nominated by the chairman are part of the council. The National Council is responsible for electing central office-bearers.

==== Intra-party elections ====
In March 2012, PTI announced plans to conduct US-style intra-party elections, aiming to introduce local caucuses on district levels throughout the country. As part of this process, aspiring candidates would engage in debates and undergo primaries to secure a party ticket for contesting Provincial Assembly or National Assembly seats. The elections commenced in October 2012 and concluded on 23 March 2013, culminating in the election of the National Council after an extensive electoral process involving over four million registered members. With these elections, PTI became the first political party in Pakistan to conduct the largest intra-party election based on the general electoral base. On 2 December 2023, PTI held new intra-party elections, which were invalidated by Election Commission of Pakistan. The party conducted another intra-party election on 3 March 2024.

Central functions

Office	Incumbent	Term began
Chairman	Gohar Ali Khan	3 March 2024
Vice Chairman	Shah Mahmood Qureshi	3 December 2011
President	Parvez Elahi	7 March 2023
Senior Vice President	Vacant (Note: see PTI intra-party elections case)	
Senior Vice President	Vacant	
Senior Vice President	Vacant	
Senior Vice President	Vacant	
Secretary General	Salman Akram Raja	7 September 2024
Central Information Secretary	Sheikh Waqas Akram	26 September 2024

Most of PTI's central leadership was elected. Imran Khan and Shah Mehmood Qureshi were elected on 20 March 2013. The Secretary information, Secretary Finance, Secretary Social Media, Secretary Political Training, and Secretary Policy Planning are appointed by the chairman and confirmed by the CEC.

Provincial Council

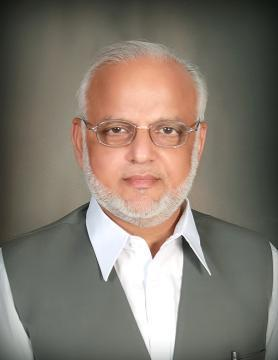
Ejaz Chaudhary, former President of Punjab Chapter

Designation	Name	Election Date
President of Punjab	Hammad Azhar	16 December 2023
General Secretary of Punjab	Hammad Azhar	4 June 2022
President of Khyber Pakhtunkhwa	Junaid Akbar	25 January 2025
General Secretary of Khyber Pakhtunkhwa	Ali Asghar Khan	3 March 2024
President of Sindh	Haleem Adil Sheikh	3 March 2024
General Secretary of Sindh	Ali Palh	3 March 2024
President of Balochistan	Dawood Shah Kakar	3 March 2024
General Secretary of Balochistan		

=== Party wings ===
Notable party
members and leaders

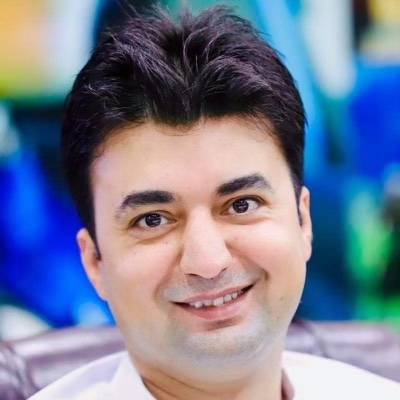
Murad Saeed

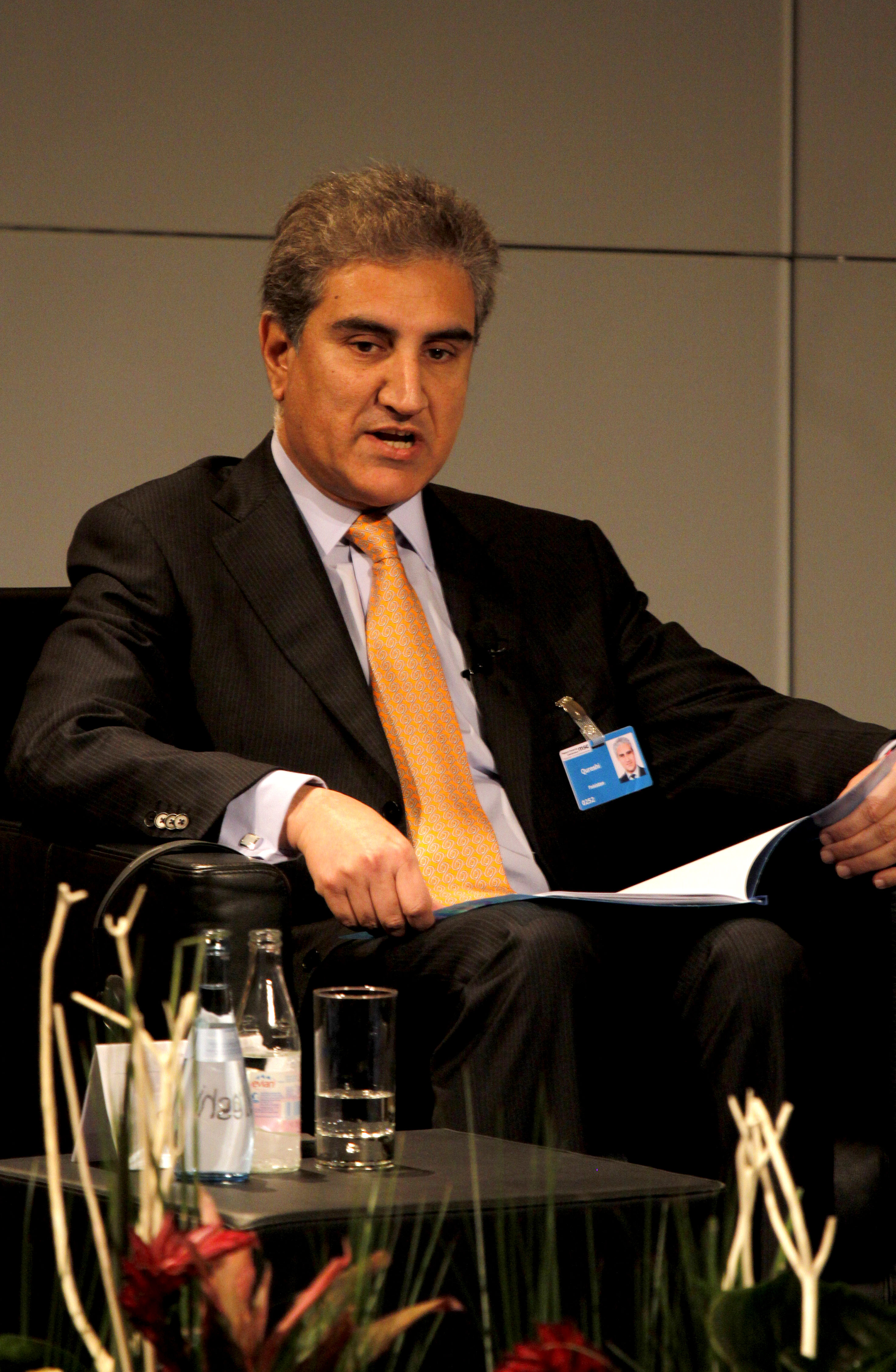
Shah Mehmood Qureshi

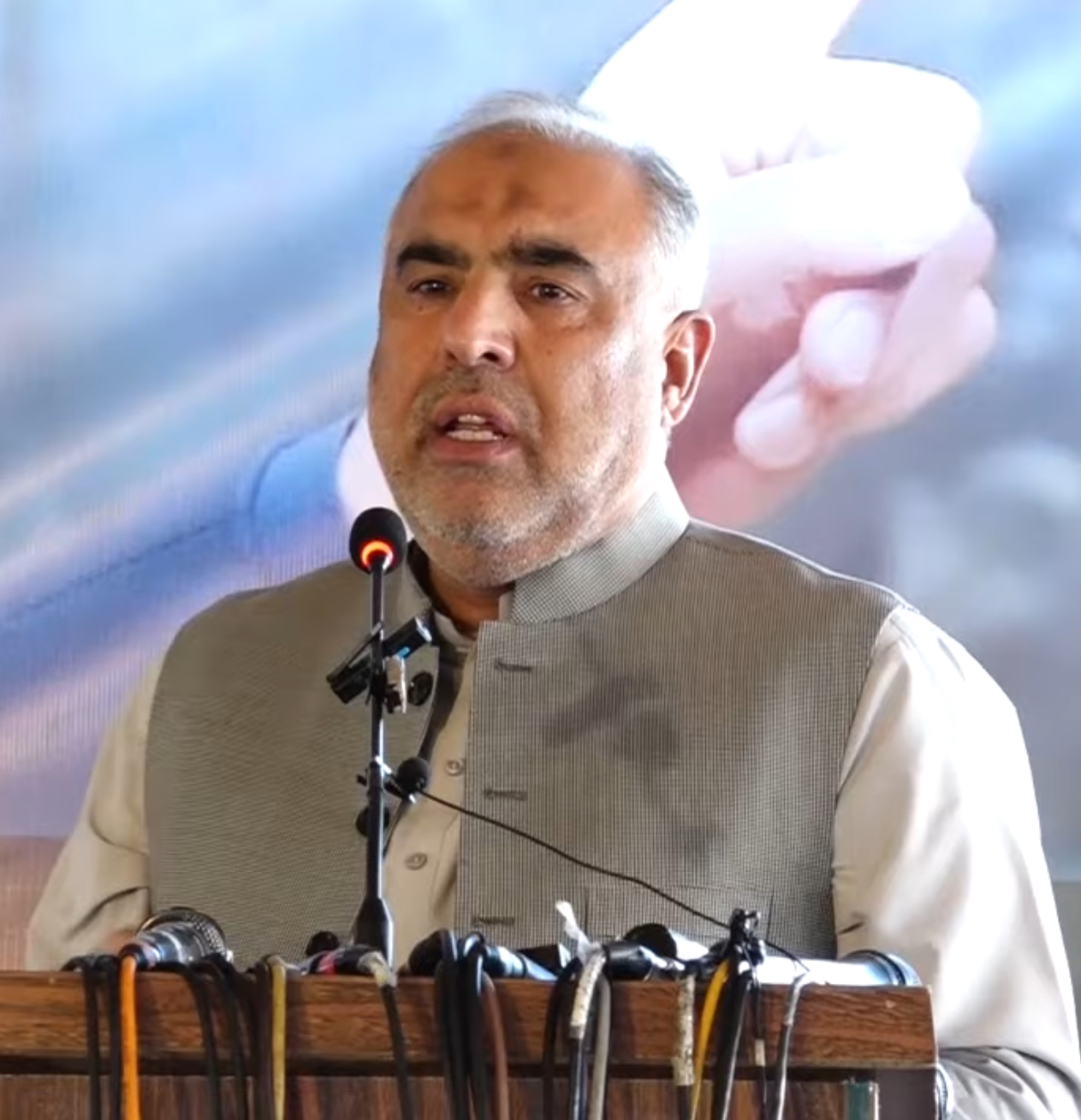
Asad Qaiser

Central Tarbiyati Council (CTC)

In June 2014, a Central Tarbiyati Council was established, which is responsible for training party activists on ideology, election campaigns, and other organizational matters.

PTI Women Wing

Designation	Name	Ref.
President	Kanwal Shauzab	
Senior Vice President	Vacant	
Vice President of Khyber Pakhtunkhwa	Vacant	
Vice President of Balochistan	Vacant	
Vice President of Sindh	Vacant	
Vice President of Punjab	Vacant	
President of Central Punjab	Shahnaz Tariq	
General Secretary	Rubina Shaheen	

Insaf Student Federation (ISF)

The Insaf Student Federation (ISF) serves as the official student wing of Pakistan Tehreek-e-Insaf.

Insaf Youth Wing

Pakistan Tehreek-e-Insaf established its youth wing aimed at addressing the concerns and challenges faced by individuals under the age of 40.

Insaf Research Wing

Insaf Research Wing (IRW) was established to conduct research aimed at finding solutions to issues in Pakistan. IRW was founded in 2009 for addressing issues within its area of expertise, covering socio-political, information technology, economics, energy, healthcare, corruption, foreign affairs, education, and environment sectors. It consists of nine committees.

The IRW has since been replaced by the Insaf Research Team.

== Electoral performance ==
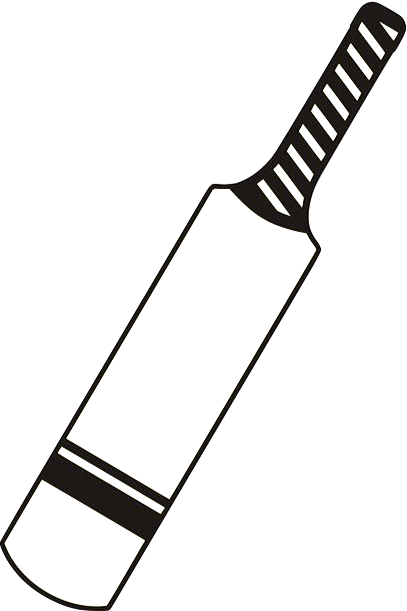
The bat remained the iconic electoral symbol of PTI from 2013 to 2023.

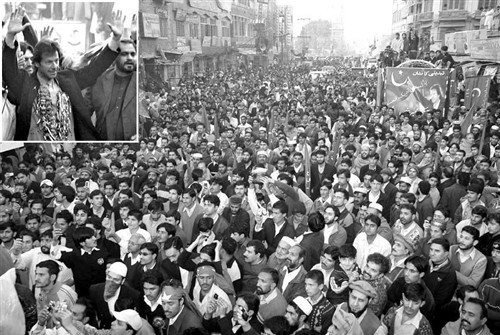
People in Peshawar gather to welcome Imran Khan on 23 December 2008.

General election results National Assembly
11th National Assembly (1997)	12th National Assembly (2002)	14th National Assembly (2013)	15th National Assembly (2018)

Electoral performance in the National Assembly
Election	Leader	Votes		Seats		Position	Result
Election	Leader	#	%	#	±	Position	Result
1997	Imran Khan	314,820	1.61	0 / 237	Steady	none	Extraparliamentary
2002	Imran Khan	242,472	0.83	1 / 342	▲1	10th	In opposition
2008	Imran Khan	Did not contest					
2013	Imran Khan	7,679,954	16.92	35 / 342	▲35	3rd	In opposition
2018	Imran Khan	16,903,702	31.92	149 / 342	▲114	1st	In government (till 11 April 2022)
2018	Imran Khan	16,903,702	31.92	149 / 342	▲114	1st	Opposition (from 11 April 2022)

Electoral Performance in Senate of Pakistan elections
Election	Leader	Votes	Seates	Position	+/–	Result
2015	Mohsin Aziz	-	9 / 104	4th	▲9	In Opposition
2018	Azam Khan Swati; Shibli Faraz; Shahzad Waseem	-	15 / 104	3rd	▲6	In Opposition
2021	Shahzad Waseem	–	26 / 100	1st	▲9	In Government
2024	Shibli Faraz	–	17 / 96	3rd	▼10	Opposition

Electoral performance in the Punjab Assembly
Election	Leader	Votes		Seats		Position	Resulting government
Election	Leader	#	%	#	±	Position	Resulting government
2013	Ghulam Sarwar Khan	4,951,216	17.76	30 / 371	▲30	2nd	PML (N) majority
2018	Sardar Usman Buzdar	11,141,139	33.65	179 / 371	▲149	1st	PTI coalition (till 30 April 2022)
2018	Sardar Usman Buzdar	11,141,139	33.65	179 / 371	▲149	1st	PML (N) coalition (from 30 April 2022 till 27 July 2022)
2018	Sardar Usman Buzdar	11,141,139	33.65	179 / 371	▲149	1st	PTI coalition (from 27 July 2022)

Electoral performance in the Khyber Pakhtunkhwa Assembly
Election	Leader	Votes		Seats		Position	Resulting government
Election	Leader	#	%	#	±	Position	Resulting government
2013	Pervez Khattak	1,039,719	19.31	61 / 124	▲61	1st	PTI coalition
2018 + 2019 (ex-FATA Elections)	Mahmood Khan	2,314,387	35.32	94 / 145	▲33	1st	PTI majority

Electoral performance in the Sindh Assembly
Election	Leader	Votes		Seats		Position	Resulting government
Election	Leader	#	%	#	±	Position	Resulting government
2013	Khurrum Sher Zaman	609,128	6.08%	4 / 168	▲4	4th	PPP majority
2018	Firdous Naqvi; Haleem Adil Sheikh	1,451,132	14.47%	30 / 168	▲26	2nd	PPP majority

Electoral performance in the Balochistan Assembly
Election	Leader	Votes		Seats		Position	Resulting government
Election	Leader	#	%	#	±	Position	Resulting government
2018	Yar Muhammad Rind	109,488	6.21	7 / 65	▲7	4th	BAP coalition

Electoral performance in the Gilgit Baltistan Assembly
Election	Leader	Votes		Seats		Position	Resulting government
Election	Leader	#	%	#	±	Position	Resulting government
2015	Raja Jahanzeb	42,101	11.11%	1 / 33	▲1	3rd	PML (N) Majority
2020	Khalid Khurshid	–	–	22 / 33	▲21	1st	PTI Majority

Electoral performance in the Azad Kashmir Assembly
Election	Leader	Votes		Seats		Position	Resulting government
Election	Leader	#	%	#	±	Position	Resulting government
2016	Sultan Mehmood Chaudhry	211,827	12.7%	2 / 49	▲2	4th	PML (N) Majority
2021	Abdul Qayyum Khan Niazi	613,590	32.5%	32 / 53	▲24	1st	PTI Majority

=== 1997 and 2002 general elections ===
Less than a year after its establishment, PTI participated in the 1997 general elections. Imran Khan stood in seven constituencies across Pakistan but did not secure a majority in any.

During the 2002 general elections, party chairman Imran Khan won one seat from Mianwali. PTI garnered 0.8% of the popular vote.

=== 2008 general elections ===
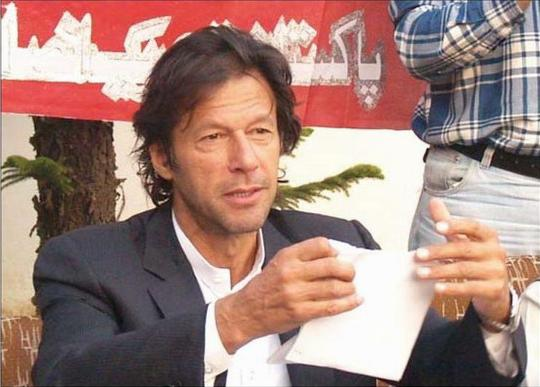
Imran Khan tearing his nomination paper at a press conference in 2007. PTI boycotted the 2008 general election.

PTI openly boycotted the Pakistani general election on 18 February 2008 because it believed that the election was fraudulent and fraught with irregularities.

=== 2013 general elections ===
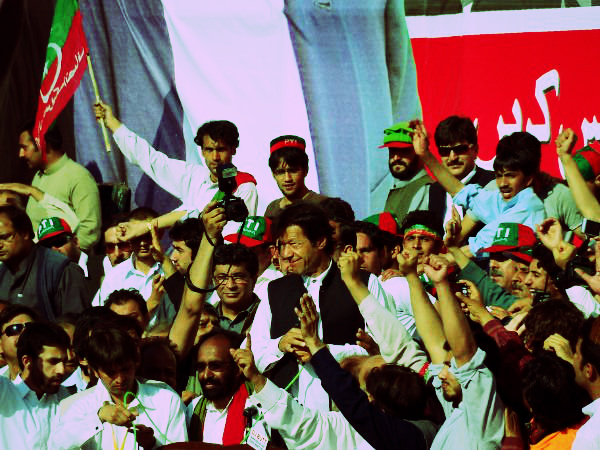
Imran Khan on stage at a 2012 public gathering at Abbottabad

On 21 April 2013, Khan, the chairman of PTI, launched his campaign for the 2013 elections from Lahore, where he addressed supporters at The Mall, Lahore followed by prayers at the Data Durbar Complex. This was followed by large rallies in Karak and Dera Ismail Khan. He also announced that he would pull Pakistan out of the US-led war on terror and bring peace in the Pashtun tribal belt. On 22 April 2013, Khan addressed different public meetings in Malakand, Lower Dir District and Upper Dir District, where he announced that PTI would introduce a uniform education system in which the children of rich and poor would have equal opportunities.

On the same day, he spoke at a rally in Rawalpindi's Constituency NA-56, accompanied by Shaikh Rasheed Ahmad. On 23 April 2013, Khan addressed large rallies in Renala Khurd, Okara, and other parts of Sahiwal Division. He challenged PML-N President Nawaz Sharif to a live debate, a challenge which PML-N was quick to decline. On 24 April, Khan addressed rallies in Nankana Sahib District, Sheikhupura, and Pattoki, where he announced that once in power, no parliamentarian would receive development funds as they are misused for achieving political gains.

On 25 April 2013, Khan addressed political gatherings in South Punjab, including in Pakpattan, Lodhran, and Vehari. On the following day, Khan continued his mass campaign in South Punjab. He addressed rallies at Jalalpur Pirwala, Muzaffargarh, Mian Channu, Kabirwala, and Khanewal. He promised to end the system of tyranny and announced that once in power, he would enact laws allowing every village or town to elect its own Station House Officer, believing it would prevent corruption and police brutality. He also promised to eliminate the post of Patwari and establish a computerised and professional land record system.

Khan concluded his South Punjab campaign by addressing rallies at Bahawalpur, Khanpur, Sadiqabad, Rahim Yar Khan, and Rajanpur on 27 April. During the campaign, he collectively visited over 25 towns and cities, addressing dozens of rallies and corner meetings. He promised to hold accountable the killers behind the assassination of Benazir Bhutto and stated that the local government system is important for the prosperity of Pakistan. On 28 April, Khan moved to central Punjab where he addressed large rallies in Mandi Bahauddin, Hafizabad, and Sargodha, promising to bring justice and equality to Pakistan.

On 29 April 2013, Khan addressed rallies at Murree, Talagang, Chakwal, Taxila, and Attock. On 30 April, Khan visited his hometown of Mianwali, where he addressed several rallies, criticizing the Bhuttos and Sharifs. He stated, 'You can't lead a revolution from behind bulletproof glass,' and claimed that he had conquered the fear of dying 17 years ago. On 1 and 2 March, Khan addressed gatherings in Sibi, Loralai, Zafarwal, Pasrur, Narowal, Jacobabad, and also led a car rally in Rawalpindi. On 3 May, Khan continued his campaign at Battagram, Mansehra, Torghar District, Abbottabad, and Haripur, followed by rallies at Buner District, Swabi, Charsadda, Mardan, Nowshera, and Peshawar on 4th, promising to abandon the war on terror.

PTI in 2013 Elections by percentage of votes polled

Pakistan's 2013 elections took place on 11 May 2013 across the country. The elections resulted in a clear majority for the Pakistan Muslim League (N), a strong rival of Pakistan Tehreek-e-Insaf, although PTI managed to surpass the Pakistan Peoples Party as the main opposition to PML-N's candidates in the Punjab Province. PTI's popularity propelled 20 representatives to the Punjab Assembly. PTI also emerged as the second-largest party in Karachi.

According to unofficial results announced by Pakistani media and the Election Commission of Pakistan, Imran Khan, Chairman of PTI, won three of the four constituencies he contested, securing victories in Constituency NA-1, Constituency NA-56, and Constituency NA-71. PTI won 31 directly elected parliamentary seats, marking a significant increase from the 2002 elections. Nationally, PTI became the third-largest party and the largest in Khyber Pakhtunkhwa, as well as the second-largest in Punjab. In Khyber Pakhtunkhwa, PTI defeated all mainstream political parties across the province with mostly new candidates. It secured every seat in Peshawar, Nowshera, and Mardan district. It is anticipated that PTI will lead a coalition government in the province. However, PTI failed to secure a majority in Punjab and made limited gains in Sindh or Baluchistan. PTI obtained 34 out of 99 seats in the Khyber Pakhtunkhwa Assembly.

Apart from Karachi, Sindh was largely overlooked by PTI during much of its election campaign, and this is reflected in the results. The party failed to field candidates in 19 out of Interior Sindh's 40 constituencies. Where it did field candidates, it struggled to surpass the 5% vote benchmark in 18 constituencies. In most of these constituencies, the number of votes received was in the hundreds. PTI's only significant showing in interior Sindh was in the constituencies of NA-228 Umerkot and NA-230 Tharparkar, where the party's vice president, Shah Mehmood Qureshi, has a considerable following through his spiritual Ghousia Jamaat.

In the northwestern province of Khyber Pakhtunkhwa, PTI formed a governing coalition with the Jamaat-e-Islami and Qaumi Watan parties in 2013. On 13 May 2013, Parvez Khattak was appointed as the Chief Minister of Khyber Pakhtunkhwa. The Khyber Pakhtunkhwa Development Advisory Committee includes Asad Umar, Jehangir Khan Tareen, Ali Asghar Khan, Khalid Mehsud, and Rustam Shah Mohmand.

=== 2015 Local bodies elections ===
Electoral performance in the Khyber Pakhtunkhwa local elections (district seats)
Election	Seats		Position
Election	#	±	Position
2015	395 / 1,484	Steady	1st

=== 2018 general elections ===
Pakistan's 2018 elections took place on 25 July 2018 nationwide. The elections saw the PTI secure a majority of seats in the National Assembly with 116 seats won. Adding 28 women and 5 Minority seats, the total tally reached 149. With PTI securing the largest seat share and vote share, it formed a government at the centre in alliance with Muttahida Qaumi Movement-Pakistan (MQM-P), Pakistan Muslim League (Q) (PML (Q)), Balochistan Awami Party (BAP), Balochistan National Party (Mengal) (BNP-M), Grand Democratic Alliance (GDA), Awami Muslim League (Pakistan) (AML), and Jamhoori Wattan Party (JWP). Additionally, PTI secured government in Khyber Pakhtunkhwa with 78 seats, Punjab with 175 seats, and formed an alliance government in Balochistan. Following the elections, Imran Khan was elected as Prime Minister, receiving 176 votes against Shehbaz Sharif's 96 votes. PTI also succeeded in electing its Speaker and Deputy Speaker of the National Assembly, Asad Qaiser and Qasim Suri respectively. On 4 September 2018, Arif Alvi was elected as the 13th President of Pakistan. PTI nominated Usman Buzdar as Chief Minister of Punjab, Mahmood Khan as Chief Minister of Khyber Pakhtunkhwa, and Jam Kamal Khan as Chief Minister of Balochistan. The party also appointed governors: Chaudhry Sarwar as Governor of Punjab, Imran Ismail as Governor of Sindh, and Shah Farman as Governor of Khyber Pakhtunkhwa. Prime Minister Imran Khan formed his cabinet, with key positions like Minister of Finance entrusted to Asad Umar and Minister of Foreign Affairs to Shah Mehmood Qureshi.

=== 2024 general elections ===
Several senior PTI leaders were imprisoned in the run-up to the elections in connection with the May 9 riots, on allegations of inciting violence and participating in attacks on government and military installations, including police stations and the Corps Commander House, Lahore, also known as Jinnah House. PTI was denied its election symbol after the Election Commission ruled that the party had failed to conduct valid intra-party elections under the Election Act, 2017, a decision later upheld by the Supreme Court in the PTI intra-party elections case.

In January 2024, PTI, the Human Rights Commission of Pakistan, and the election watchdog Free and Fair Election Network (FAFEN) raised concerns about pre-poll irregularities. PTI alleged that a crackdown and restrictive measures severely hindered its ability to campaign for the elections. PTI claimed that it had emerged as the single largest party and alleged that results in several constituencies were manipulated, asserting that Form 47 results for 18 National Assembly seats were falsely changed by returning officers, resulting in reduced vote counts for PTI-backed candidates. PTI-affiliated candidate Yasmin Rashid claimed that she defeated three-time former Prime Minister Nawaz Sharif in NA-130 Lahore-XIV and alleged that the election results in the constituency were manipulated. PTI claimed that its backed candidates would have won as many as 180 National Assembly seats in the absence of alleged electoral manipulation, compared with the 93 seats won by PTI-backed candidates. Rehana Dar, a PTI-backed independent candidate, claimed that Khawaja Asif lost the election in NA-71 Sialkot-II according to Form 45, but was declared the winner in Form 47, and challenged the result in court.

== Presence across provincial assemblies ==
Provincial assembly	Seats	Status		
Provincial assembly	Seats	In government	Single largest party	Majority/coalition
AJK Legislative Assembly	19 / 53	No	Yes	Opposition
Provincial Assembly of Balochistan	0 / 65	—N/a	—N/a	No presence
Gilgit-Baltistan Legislative Assembly	22 / 33	Yes	Yes	Majority
Provincial Assembly of Khyber Pakhtunkhwa	58 / 145	Yes	Yes	Majority
Provincial Assembly of Punjab	29 / 371	No	No	Opposition
Provincial Assembly of Sindh	6 / 168	No	No	In Opposition

=== Khyber Pakhtunkhwa ===
In the northwestern province of Khyber Pakhtunkhwa, PTI has ruled with a majority government three times. PTI ruled from 2013 to 2018 under the Pervez Khattak administration, from 2018 to 2023 under Chief Minister Mahmood Khan and from 2024 to the present under the Gandapur ministry.

In the 2024 Khyber Pakhtunkhwa provincial election, Independent candidates allied with PTI won 86 seats. Subsequently, Ali Amin Gandapur was elected as Chief Minister of Khyber Pakhtunkhwa on PTI's behalf. Out of these 86 seats, 58 are officially recognized as PTI members by the Supreme Court of Pakistan and Election Commission of Pakistan, while the remaining seats are officially Independents.

=== Punjab ===
In Pakistan's most populous province, Punjab, PTI has served as the largest opposition party twice and the ruling majority party once. From 2013 to 2018, PTI served as the largest opposition party with 30 seats and had PTI leader Mehmood-ur-Rasheed as opposition leader. From 2018 to 2022 PTI served as the largest and ruling party in Punjab, with Usman Buzdar as Chief Minister of Punjab. From 2024 to the present PTI is serving as the opposition party in the Punjab Assembly.

In the 2024 Punjab provincial election, Independent candidates allied with PTI won the second-most seats, though the party claims it won the first-most seats without rigging. Out of this, 29 have been recognized as PTI members by the Supreme Court of Pakistan and Election Commission of Pakistan, while the remaining seats are officially recognized as members of the Sunni Ittehad Council. PTI nominated Mian Aslam Iqbal for Opposition Leader but has been replaced by Malik Ahmad Khan Bhachar temporarily due to threats of an arrest to Iqbal.

=== Sindh ===
In the southern province of Sindh, PTI has been the largest opposition party once, from 2018 to 2022, with Firdous Shamim Naqvi and Haleem Adil Sheikh as Leader of the Opposition in the Provincial Assembly of Sindh. PTI is currently serving as an opposition party in Sindh since 2024 after PTI-backed members won 10 seats. Out of these, 6 are recognized as PTI and 4 are recognized as members of the Sunni Ittehad Council. PTI has alleged that 38 Sindh Assembly seats, many of which are in Karachi were rigged in the 2024 Sindh provincial election against it, in favor of MQM-P and PPP.

PTI has been found to win most of its seats in Karachi. It also holds a political alliance with the Grand Democratic Alliance (GDA) against PPP.

== Controversies ==
=== Foreign funding case ===
In 2014, former PTI founding member Akbar S. Babar filed a case accusing the party's leadership of receiving election funding from prohibited international sources, including individuals and firms. The Election Commission of Pakistan (ECP) established a scrutiny committee in March 2018 to examine PTI's accounts. The committee submitted its report to the ECP in December 2021. PTI requested the ECP to keep the report confidential, but the request was rejected. The report stated that PTI had received funding from foreign nationals and companies, under-reported funds and concealed dozens of its bank accounts. According to the report, PTI under-reported Rs312 million over a four-year period between the 2009–10 and 2012–13 financial years, including more than Rs145 million in 2012–13 alone. The report also said that the party had refused to provide details of some large transactions and that the scrutiny panel had been unable to obtain details of PTI's foreign accounts and funds collected abroad.

The ECP had heard the case more than 150 times by January 2022, with PTI seeking adjournments on 54 occasions. The ECP ruled in August 2022 that PTI had "knowingly and willfully" received money from such entities and concealed at least 16 bank accounts in violation of the Constitution.

=== Protests and civil disobedience ===
PTI launched its first dharna on 14 August 2014. The party was involved in laying siege and paralyzing the capital of Pakistan, Islamabad, to stop the Government from functioning. PTI was charged with targeting Pakistan Television and parliament, as well as law enforcement. The party founder, Imran Khan, burned his utility bills to encourage participants to join his protest against rising electricity prices.

=== Attacks on journalists and harassment of women by alleged PTI supporters ===
PTI supporters have been reported to have attacked media personnel during their protest demonstrations. Several female journalists have reported harassment by party workers. The harassment of women has also been reported at PTI's gatherings.

During PTI's public protests, Geo News DSNGs had to remove their stickers to escape vandalism by party workers. PTI workers also attacked the Geo News Islamabad office.

=== Allegations of conspiracy to dissolve government using judiciary ===
PTI's former president, Makhdoom Javed Hashmi, has alleged that Imran Khan was conspiring with the Chief Justice of Pakistan, Nasirul Mulk. to dissolve the government of Nawaz Sharif.

=== Accusation of anti-state violence ===
Following the arrest of Imran Khan on 9 May 2023, the supporters and workers of PTI allegedly targeted Pakistan Army's installations. The protesters broke into the regional commander's house in Lahore and burned the building. They also attempted to enter GHQ's gate in Rawalpindi. In Peshawar, the building of Radio Pakistan was set on fire by the protesters, who also shouted slogans against the army and military officials. However, Imran Khan and his party denied their involvement in the violence and accused secret agencies of framing the party for anti-army violence.

Reportedly, thousands of PTI workers have been arrested due to their alleged involvement in violent attacks on government institutions across the country after 9 May.

In response to the attacks, the Pakistan Army called 9 May a dark chapter in the country's history and claimed that PTI "has done what enemies could not do in 75 years." Meanwhile, PTI alleges that the incidents of 9 May were a false flag operation designed by the Pakistani establishment to disintegrate PTI and frame Imran Khan.

== See also ==
- Politics of Pakistan
- List of political parties in Pakistan
- List of student federations of Pakistan
- List of Pakistan Tehreek-e-Insaf MPs

== Bibliography ==
- Mufti, Mariam; Siddiqui, Niloufer; Shafqat, Sahar, eds. (May 2020). Pakistan's Political Parties: Surviving Between Dictatorship and Democracy. Georgetown University Press. pp. 60–73. ISBN 978-1-62616-772-8.
- Shah, Sikander Ahmed (30 April 2024). Federalist Solutions to Pakistan's Political Crises. Lexington Books. p. 315. ISBN 978-1-6669-5546-0.
