= 2023 in Pakistan =

- Decades: 2000s; 2010s; 2020s
- See also: History of Pakistan; List of years in Pakistan; Timeline of Pakistani history

The events listed below are both anticipated and scheduled for the year 2023 in Pakistan.

== Incumbents ==
=== Federal government ===
S. No	Photo	Name	Office
1		Arif Alvi	President of Pakistan
2		Anwar ul Haq Kakar	Prime Minister of Pakistan
3		Sadiq Sanjrani	Chairman of the Senate
4		Raja Pervaiz Ashraf	Speaker of the National Assembly
5		Qazi Faez Isa	Chief Justice of Pakistan
6		Sikandar Sultan Raja	Chief Election Commissioner of Pakistan
7		Dissolved	National Assembly
8		14th Senate of Pakistan	Senate of Pakistan

=== Provincial government ===
Province	Governor	Chief Minister		Government Type	Chief Justice
Balochistan	Abdul Wali Kakar	Ali Mardan Khan Domki		Caretaker	Naeem Akhtar (BHC)
Gilgit-Baltistan	Mehdi Shah	Gulbar Khan	PTI	Coalition	Shamim Khan (SACGB)
Khyber Pakhtunkhwa	Ghulam Ali	Arshad Hussain Shah		Caretaker	Muhammad Ibrahim Khan (PHC)
Punjab	Baligh Ur Rehman	Mohsin Naqvi		Caretaker	Ameer Bhatti (LHC)
Sindh	Kamran Tessori	Maqbool Baqar		Caretaker	Ahmed Ali Sheikh (SHC)

=== State government ===
Province	President	Prime minister		Government Type	Chief Justice
Azad Kashmir	Sultan Mehmood Chaudhry	Chaudhry Anwarul Haq	PTI	Coalition	Raja Saeed Akram Khan (SCAJK)

=== Services chief ===
S. No	Photo	Name	Office
1		Asim Munir	Chief of Army Staff
2		Zaheer Ahmad Babar	Chief of Air Staff
3		Naveed Ashraf	Chief of Naval Staff
4		Sahir Shamshad Mirza	Chairman Joint Chiefs of Staff Committee

== Events ==
=== January ===
- 2 January – New Zealand tour to Pakistan
- 3 January –
  - Two intelligence officers, including the director of the provincial counterterrorism department, are shot dead outside a restaurant in Khanewal, Punjab, by suspected Pakistani Taliban gunmen.
  - The government orders the closure of all shopping malls and retail markets by 8:30 p.m. (PKT) daily as part of an energy conservation plan to offset increasing energy prices.
- 5 January – Pakistan was shaken by a 5.8-magnitude earthquake, according to the National Seismic Monitoring Center, and the tremors were felt in Gilgit, Jhelum, Chakwal, Pakpattan, Lakki Marwat, Nowshera, Malakand, Azad Kashmir, and other areas of the country.
- 9 January – The Government of Pakistan and the United Nations co-hosted one-day International Conference on Climate Resilient Pakistan in Geneva, Switzerland to aid Pakistani people after the devastating floods in 2022. Under the presidency of Shehbaz Sharif, the Prime Minister of Pakistan, and Antonio Guterres, the Secretary-General of the United Nations, Pakistan raised more than $10 billion for recovery and rehabilitation process in flood effecting areas.
- 13 January – Sarband police station attack in Peshawar, Khyber Pakhtunkhwa.
- 14 January – The 17th Provincial Assembly of the Punjab is dissolved after 48 hours had passed since Chaudhry Pervaiz Elahi, the Chief Minister of Punjab, had sent a summary to Muhammad Baligh Ur Rehman, the Governor of Punjab.
- 15 January – Polling for the second phase of Sindh local government elections were held in the 16 districts of Karachi and Hyderabad.
- 18 January – Haji Ghulam Ali, the Governor of Khyber Pakhtunkhwa, dissolved the 11th Provincial Assembly of Khyber Pakhtunkhwa, on the advice of Mahmood Khan, the Chief Minister of Khyber Pakhtunkhwa.
- 19 January – Three police officers are killed in a suicide bombing at a police outpost in Khyber Pakhtunkhwa.
- 20 January – A bombing derails a passenger train in Peshi village, Kachhi District, Balochistan, injuring eight people.
- 21 January – Muhammad Azam Khan was sworn in as the Caretaker Chief Minister of Khyber Pakhtunkhwa.
- 22 January – Mohsin Raza Naqvi was sworn in as the Caretaker Chief Minister of Punjab.
- 23 January – A major power outage in Pakistan leaves nearly 220 million people without electricity after a failure at the national power grid. Earlier this month, Shehbaz Sharif had ordered a reduction of energy consumption as the country faces a severe energy crisis.
- 27 January – It is announced that at least 18 people have been killed in the past two weeks by toxic chemicals from factories in Karachi, Sindh.
- 29 January –
  - Tanda Dam boat disaster: Fifty one people are killed when their boat capsizes in Tanda Dam, Kohat District, Khyber Pakhtunkhwa.
- 30 January – 2023 Peshawar mosque bombing: 84 people are killed and over 200 others are injured when a Jamaat-ul-Ahrar suicide bomber detonates his explosive vest in a mosque in Peshawar.

=== February ===
- 3 February – At least seventeen people are killed when a bus and a truck crash in a head-on collision in Kohat District, Khyber Pakhtunkhwa.
- 6 February – Pakistani Prime Minister Shehbaz Sharif orders the ban on Wikipedia to be lifted, three days after the website was banned for alleged anti-Muslim and blasphemous content.
- 10 February – Two people are killed and three others are injured when a roadside bomb hits a vehicle in Kohlu District, Balochistan.
- 13 February – 2023 Pakistan Super League
- 13 February – Lynching of Muhammad Waris: Police in Punjab, arrest 50 men for the lynching of a blasphemy suspect at a police station in Nankana Sahib District two days ago.
- 14 February – Three Pakistani Taliban members are killed by fellow militants who were trying to free them while being transported from Miranshah to Bannu, Khyber Pakhtunkhwa by counter-terrorism officers. Four of the attackers are also killed in the ensuing shootout.
- 20 February – February 2023 Kallar Kahar bus accident: Fourteen people are killed and 63 others are injured when a bus crashes and overturns near Kallar Kahar, Chakwal District, Punjab.
- 20 February – 2023 Barkhan incident
- 22 February – Jail Bharo Tehreek
- 25 February – Thirteen people are killed and several others are injured when a bus collides with a van in Rahim Yar Khan, Punjab.
- 26 February – 2023 Barkhan bombing: Four people are killed and 14 others are injured in a bombing at a market in Barkhan, Balochistan.

=== March ===
- 3 March – Harnai coal mine explosion
- 6 March – Bolan suicide bombing - At least nine police officers are killed and 16 other people are injured in Bolan, Kachhi District, Balochistan, when a suicide bomber riding on a bike strikes a police vehicle.
- 20 March – Haripur rocket attack
- 21 March – 2023 Afghanistan–Pakistan earthquake, Parts of Afghanistan and Pakistan were hit by a strong earthquake measuring 6.8 on the Richter scale, resulting in casualties and property damage. At least 11 people died in Pakistan, and a total of ten deaths were reported in Afghanistan and Pakistan combined as a result of the earthquake.
- 29 March – 2023 Lakki Marwat terrorist attack: Four people are killed and six others are injured by two roadside bombings targeting police in Lakki Marwat, Khyber Pakhtunkhwa.
- 30 March - The Lahore High Court rules that Pakistan's sedition law is unconstitutional, on the grounds that it violates free speech.
- 31 March – 2023 Pakistan ration distribution stampedes: Eleven people are killed when crushed in a crowd which gathered to collect food outside a factory in Karachi, Sindh.

=== April ===
- 1 April - 2023 Kech District attack
- 7 April -
  - Pakistan arrests the founder of the Baloch Nationalist Army in the country's southwest.
  - 2023 Yar Hussain grenade attack
- 8 April - 2023 Khyber bombing: an improvised explosive device (IED) strikes a security forces vehicle, which results in the deaths of two soldiers and injury to four others in Khyber Pakhtunkhwa's Khyber District.
- 9 April - Kacha Operation
- 12 April - 2023 Karachi factory fire
- 18 April - 2023 Torkham landslide: a landslide near Torkham on the Afghanistan-Pakistan border kills at least three people.
- 24 April - 2023 Kabal explosions
- 27 April - 2023 Karachi Express train fire

=== May ===
- 4 May - Parachinar school shooting
- 9 May - Arrest of Imran Khan
- 15 May - 2023 PDM sit-in
- 18 May - 2023 Peshawar blast
- 19 May - 2023 Zhob suicide attack
- 21 May - A terrorist attack at the Iran–Pakistan border kills some Iranian border guards.
- 27 May - 2023 Astore avalanche

=== June ===
- 10 Jun - 2023 Khyber Pakhtunkhwa rains and storms
- June - A terrorist attack at the Iran-Pakistan border in which some Pakistan border patrol officers were killed.

=== July ===
- 7 July – 2023 Shandur Polo Festival
- 20 July – 2023 Bara bombing
- 30 July – 2023 Khar bombing

=== August ===
- 5 August – Imran Khan is arrested for the second time.
- 6 August – 2023 Hazara Express derailment
- 10 August – President Arif Alvi dissolved the National Assembly on the advice of Prime Minister Shehbaz Sharif.
- 11 August – Kamran Tessori, the Governor of Sindh, dissolved the 15th Provincial Assembly on the advice of Murad Ali Shah, the Chief Minister of Sindh.
- 12 August – Abdul Wali Kakar, the Governor of Balochistan, dissolved the 11th Provincial Assembly of Balochistan, on the advice of Abdul Quddus Bizenjo, the Chief Minister of Balochistan.
- 12 August - Anwaar ul Haq Kakar was sworn in as the eighth Caretaker Prime Minister of Pakistan.
- 13 August – Kashmir Premier League (Pakistan)
- 17 August – Maqbool Baqar is sworn in as the Caretaker Chief Minister of Sindh.
- 18 August – Ali Mardan Khan Domki is sworn in as the Caretaker Chief Minister of Balochistan.
- 19 August – 2023 North Waziristan landmine attack
- 29 August – The Islamabad High Court reverses a lower court's three-year imprisonment verdict against former prime minister Imran Khan for graft, while granting him bail.

=== September ===
- 2 September – 2023 Asia Cup Babar azam scored 151 against nepal on 31/08/2023
- 29 September –
  - Hangu mosque bombing
  - 2023 Mastung bombing: At least 50 people are killed and more than 50 others are injured by a suicide bombing at a religious gathering in Mastung, Balochistan.

=== October ===
- 16 October – Pakistani Foreign Minister Jalil Abbas Jilani has condemned the Israeli bombing on Gaza, calling the actions “genocide”.
- 21 October – Former Pakistani Prime Minister Nawaz Sharif returns to Pakistan after four years in self-imposed exile in London.
- 23 October – The Supreme Court of Pakistan declares the courts-martial of civilians unconstitutional, moving the trials of over 100 pro-Imran Khan protesters to civilian criminal courts.

=== November ===
- 3 November –
  - 2023 Dera Ismail Khan bombing: Five people are killed and 20 others injured by a motorcycle bomb at a bus stop in Dera Ismail Khan, Khyber Pakhtunkhwa, when a police bus carrying officers passed the area.
  - 2023 Gwadar ambush
- 4 November – Mianwali air base attack: Nine Tehreek-e-Jihad gunmen are killed during a shootout with soldiers when trying to storm a training air base in Mianwali, Punjab.
- 6 November - 2023 Tirah shooting

=== December ===
- 2 December - Chilas bus shooting
- 12 December – Daraban police station attack: A Tehreek-e-Jihad militant blows himself up with a car bomb outside a police station being used by the army in Daraban, Dera Ismail Khan District, Khyber Pakhtunkhwa, before six gunmen open fire, killing at least 23 people and wounding 34 others.
- 15 December – 2023 Tank district attack
- 20 December – Sarfraz Bungulzai, leader of the separatist Baloch Nationalist Army, surrenders to authorities alongside 70 other militants in Balochistan.
- 21 December – Police beat and arrest several protestors during a march toward Islamabad from Turbat, Kech District, after about 200 people planned to rally in the capital to draw attention to the killing of a man in police custody in Balochistan in November.

=== Unknown dates ===
- International Urdu Conference

== Deaths ==
- 5 February - Pervez Musharraf, former president and army chief
- 13 February - Zia Mohyeddin, television actor and director
- 26 February - Shahida Raza, field hockey and football player
- 22 March - Salim Khatri, religious leader
- 27 May - Seemin Jamali, medical doctor
- 1 August - Shams Buneri, Pashto poet
- 17 August - Kunwar Naveed Jamil, politician
- 8 September - Shoukat Ali Laleka, politician
- 12 September - Rana Maqbool Ahmad, Senator
- 11 November - Muhammad Azam Khan, Caretaker Chief Minister of Khyber Pakhtunkhwa

== See also ==
=== Country overviews ===
- Pakistan
- Economy of Pakistan
- Government of Pakistan
- History of Pakistan
- History of modern Pakistan
- Outline of Pakistan
- Politics of Pakistan
- Terrorist incidents in Pakistan in 2023
- Years in Pakistan

=== Related timelines for current period ===
- 2023
- 2023 in politics and government
- 2020s
- 21st century
