= 2021 in Pakistan =

- Decades: 2000s; 2010s; 2020s
- See also: History of Pakistan; List of years in Pakistan; Timeline of Pakistani history

Events from the year 2021 in Pakistan.

== Incumbents ==
=== National government ===
Photo	Post	Name
	President of Pakistan	Arif Alvi
	Prime Minister of Pakistan	Imran Khan
	Chief Justice of Pakistan	Gulzar Ahmed
	Chairman of the Senate	Sadiq Sanjrani
	Speaker of the National Assembly	Asad Qaiser
	Chief Election Commissioner of Pakistan	Sikandar Sultan Raja
	Chairman Joint Chiefs of Staff Committee	Nadeem Raza

=== Provincial governments ===
Province	Governor	Chief Minister	Party	Government Type	Chief Justice
Balochistan	Amanullah Khan Yasinzai (until 7 July); Syed Zahoor Ahmad Agha (starting 7 July)	Jam Kamal Khan (until 7 July); Abdul Quddus Bizenjo (starting 7 July)	BAP	Collision	Naeem Akhtar
Gilgit-Baltistan	Raja Jalal Hussain Maqpoon	Khalid Khurshid	PTI	Majority	Muhammad Ajmal Gondal
Khyber Pakhtunkhwa	Shah Farman	Mahmood Khan	PTI	Majority	Qaiser Rashid Khan (Peshawar High Court)
Punjab	Chaudhry Mohammad Sarwar	Usman Buzdar	PTI	Collision	Muhammad Ameer Bhatti (Lahore High Court)
Sindh	Imran Ismail	Syed Murad Ali Shah	PPP	Majority	Ahmed Ali Sheikh

== Events ==
=== January and February ===
- 2 January
  - 23 year-old Usama Satti was shot to death in his car by Islamabad Police.
  - Zakiur Rehman Lakhvi was arrested in Lahore, on terrorism-financing charges.
- 3 January - Islamic State (IS) terrorists killed 11 Hazara coal miners in Machh attack
- 5 January - The Supreme Court ordered that the Shri Paramhans Ji Maharaj Samadhi temple in Teri, Karak District, be rebuilt by the government after it was destroyed by a mob in December 2020.
- 9 January – A blackout in Pakistan left as much as 90 percent of the country without electricity at its height as officials rushed to restore power.
- 11 January - 9 countries appointed new ambassadors to Pakistan: Nepal, Tapas Adhikari; Belarus, Andrei Metdlitsa; South Korea, Sush Sangpyo; Cuba, Zener Javier; Mali, Dianguinadit Yaya Doucoure; Ireland, Ms Sonya McGuinness; Sierra Leone, Alie Kamara; Cambodia, Ung Sean; Kosovo, Ilir Dugolli.
- 12 January - Two gunmen attacked a team of polio vaccinators in Karak, Khyber Pakhtunkhwa, killing a policeman who was escorting them.
- 28 January – A Malaysian court ordered the immediate release of Pakistan International Airlines (PIA) plane which was seized on 15 January, at the Kuala Lumpur International Airport, over a lease dispute.
- 22 February - Ippi murder of four female aid workers

=== March and April ===
- 21 March – Janikhel protest
- 24 March - 2021 Chaman bombings
- 11 April - 20 April - 2021 Pakistani protests
- 21 April - Quetta Serena Hotel bombing

=== May and June ===
- 21 May - 2021 Chaman bombings
- 31 May - May 2021 Balochistan attacks
- 7 June - 2021 Ghotki rail crash
- 23 June - 2021 Lahore bombing

=== July and August ===
- 14 July - Dasu bus attack
- 21 July - Raghagan Dam incident
- 25 July - 2021 Azad Kashmiri general election
- 28 July - 2021 Islamabad flooding
- 8 August - Pakistan at the 2021 Islamic Solidarity Games
- 9 August - August 2021 Quetta bombing
- 12 August - Pakistan Ordnance Factories explosion
- 14 August - Karachi grenade attack
- 17 August - Vandalism of Maharaja Ranjeet Singh's statue in Lahore
- 20 August - Gwadar suicide attack
- 26 August - August 2021 Balochistan attacks

=== September and October ===
- 5 September - 2021 Quetta suicide attack
- 7 October - 2021 Balochistan earthquake
- 22 October - October 2021 Tehreek-e-Labbaik Pakistan protests

=== November and December ===
- 3 November - Azad Kashmir bus incident
- 8 November - West Indies women's cricket team in Pakistan in 2021–22
- 28 November - Charsadda arson attack
- 3 December - Lynching of Priyantha Kumara
- 17 December - Eighth Extraordinary Session of the Islamic Summit Conference
- 19 December - 2021 Khyber Pakhtunkhwa local elections

== Economy ==
- 2020–21 Pakistan federal budget
- 2021–22 Pakistan federal budget

== Deaths ==
=== March ===
- 1 March - Ejaz Durrani, film actor

=== April ===
- 2 April - Shaukat Ali, singer

=== May ===
- 14 May - Farooq Qaiser, artist, puppeteer

=== July ===
- 1 July - Anwar Iqbal, actor
- 14 July - Mamnoon Hussain, 12th President of Pakistan (b. 1941)
- 16 July - Sultana Zafar, actress
- 17 July - Naila Jaffri, actress

=== February ===
- 18 February - Mushahid Ullah Khan, politician

=== August ===
- 12 August - Durdana Butt, actress

=== October ===
- 2 October - Umer Shareef, actor, comedian
- 10 October - Abdul Qadeer Khan, Father of Pakistan's nuclear program

=== November ===
- 13 November - Sohail Asghar, actor

== See also ==
=== Country overviews ===
- Pakistan
- History of Pakistan
- History of modern Pakistan
- Outline of Pakistan
- Government of Pakistan
- Politics of Pakistan
- Years in Pakistan

=== Related timelines for current period ===
- 2021
- 2021 in politics and government
- 2020s
- 21st century
