= Terrorist incidents in Pakistan in 2021 =

This article is an incomplete outline of terrorist incidents in Pakistan in 2021 in chronological order.

== January ==
- 3 January - Machh attack

== February ==
- 22 February - Ippi shooting

== March ==
- 24 March - 2021 Chaman bombings

== April ==
- 21 April - Quetta Serena Hotel bombing

== May ==
- 21 May - 2021 Chaman bombings
- 31 May - May 2021 Balochistan attacks

== June ==
- 1 June - At least 4 terrorists were killed and 8 were injured in two separate attacks in Balochistan. Four soldiers were also killed and eight others were injured in the attacks.
- 4 June - 2 policemen were killed in a terror attack in Islamabad.
- 9 June - Two police officers protecting polio team were killed by unknown motorcyclists in Mardan.
- 23 June - 2021 Lahore bombing
- 28 June - 1 soldier of Frontier Corps Balochistan was killed in terrorist attack in Shapak, District Hoshab Balochistan.

== July ==
- 14 July- A Bus carrying Chinese workers in the Dasu area of Upper Kohistan District fell into a ravine after an explosion, killing 13 people, including nine Chinese residents and 4 Pakistanis, and injured 28 others.

== August ==
- 9 August - August 2021 Quetta bombing
- 14 August - Karachi grenade attack
- 20 August - Gwadar suicide attack
- 26 August - August 2021 Balochistan attacks

== September ==
- 5 September - 2021 Quetta suicide attack
- 11 September - Two soldiers of Frontier Corps South were killed and another was injured when armed men attacked their convoy in the Buleda area of Kech district.
- 15 September - Seven soldiers of the Pakistan Army were killed during an intelligence-based operation in the Asman Manza area of South Waziristan.
- 18 September - One police officer was killed by unidentified person in Takhtbai, Mardan.
- 24 September - Two security personnel were killed and five others injured in an attack in Awaran district.
- 25 September - Four security personnel were killed and two others injured in a bomb attack on a vehicle of the Frontier Corps in the Khosat area of Harnai district.

== December ==
- 18 December - 2021 Karachi explosion

== See also ==
- 2021 in Pakistan
- Terrorist incidents in Pakistan in 2020
- Terrorist incidents in Pakistan in 2022
