= 2021 Balochistan attacks =

2021 Balochistan attacks may refer to:

- 2021 Chaman bombings
- Machh attack
- May 2021 Balochistan attacks; see Insurgency in Balochistan
- Quetta Serena Hotel bombing
- August 2021 Quetta bombing
- August 2021 Balochistan attacks (disambiguation)
