= Anti-China terrorism in Pakistan =

Terrorism targeting Chinese nationals and investments in Pakistan

Many terrorist attacks targeting Chinese nationals have occurred in Pakistan. These attacks have been carried out by Pakistani terrorist organizations such as the Balochistan Liberation Army (BLA). Following is a list of terror attacks.

== Cause ==
Attacks by Pakistani militants targeting Chinese nationals have occurred since 2004. They increased beginning in 2018 as China's global influence increases, and Chinese nationals are victims of terror attacks more commonly in Pakistan than in any other country. The region of Balochistan is a major focus of the China–Pakistan Economic Corridor. Under this agreement, China has invested heavily in the region's economy and has established businesses in the area. The influx of Chinese nationals to facilitate this program has caused conflict with nationalist and separatist groups such as the BLA. The BLA has described China as an "oppressor" Ethnoseparatists are in conflict with the Pakistani government, and Chinese government cooperation is seen as a threat to this cause. Many Chinese workers are targeted because the militant groups are skeptical of their influence and feel the project is exploitive and that locals do not benefit. There are also concerns from Islamist militant groups about China's treatment of their Uighur Muslim population, although the Chinese government has rejected such claims.

== Response ==
China expanded its counterterrorism efforts following the September 11 attacks in the United States, with particular emphasis on Pakistan. China is one of the many nations with which Pakistan has collaborated in anti-terrorism agreements, and economic relations between the countries have compelled more interactions to limit terrorism. In 2009, Chinese President Hu Jintao offered Pakistan support in improving its security policy. The interior ministries of China and Pakistan participate in exchanges of expertise and intelligence to combat terrorism that targets both countries. In April 2015, a Pakistani military security force was formed with 12,000 soldiers to protect Chinese nationals in the country.

== Attacks ==
- China has said plans were made to kidnap Chinese diplomats in Pakistan in 2008 and 2009, but that they were intercepted.
- The BLA carried out an attack on the Chinese consulate in Clifton, Karachi on 23 November 2018. The attack involved three gunman attempting to gain entry to the consulate and firing upon police, with two police officers being killed in the attack.
- A suicide bombing was carried out by the Pakistani Taliban on 21 April 2021 in Quetta appearing to target Chinese ambassador to Pakistan Nong Rong. Nong Rong was at the hotel during the bombing, but five others were killed.
- A bombing killed nine Chinese workers in Khyber Pakhtunkhwa on 14 July 2021. The attack occurred when a vehicle carrying explosives collided with a bus carrying Chinese engineers to a construction site. Two Pakistani soldiers were also killed. No group has claimed responsibility for the attack, though Pakistani Foreign Minister Shah Mahmood Qureshi said that the attack was carried out by the Pakistani Taliban with backing from Afghanistan and India.
- A suicide bombing targeted a vehicle carrying Chinese nationals in Gwadar was carried out by the BLA on 20 August 2021. Two children were killed.
- A suicide bombing was carried out by the BLA at the Confucius Institute of the University of Karachi on 26 April 2022. Three Chinese instructors and their Pakistani driver were killed, and one Chinese instructor was injured.
- Five Chinese nationals and one Pakistani were killed in a suicide bomb blast in Shangla district, Khyber Pakhtunkhwa, on 26 March 2024.
- Two Chinese nationals died in an explosion near Karachi's Jinnah International Airport on 7 October 2024. The BLA claimed responsibility, targeting Chinese citizens.
- Two Chinese nationals were shot by a Pakistani guard in Karachi on 5 November 2024. Authorities claim the attack was not related to militant violence.

== See also ==
- Anti-Chinese sentiment
- Anti-globalization movement
- Terrorism in Pakistan
- Uyghur terrorism in Pakistan
