= Gwadar attack =

Gwadar attack may refer to these terrorist attacks in Gwadar, Balochistan, Pakistan as part of the larger insurgency in Balochistan:

- 2017 Gwadar labourers shooting
- 2021 Gwadar bombing
- 2023 Gwadar ambush
- 2024 Gwadar attack
