= Raghagan Dam incident =

Boat accident in Pakistan

- Date: 21 July 2021
- Location: Raghagan Dam, Bajaur, Pakistan
- Type: Boat sinking
- Cause: Poor arrangements and overloading of boats
- Deaths: 4
- Injuries: 4
- Missing: 20

On 21 July 2021, three boats sank on the first day of Eid-ul-Adha at Raghagan Dam in Bajaur, resulting in the deaths of four people and leaving 20 others missing.

== History ==
The first boat, carrying 18 tourists who had come to the dam for a picnic, capsized. A second boat, sent to rescue the passengers, also sank. The third boat, attempting to save those from the first two boats, met the same fate. Rescue boats, carrying seven people, also capsized during the operation.

The bodies of four victims have been recovered, while four others, including three children, were rescued and transported to the hospital in critical condition. Rescue officials have confirmed that 20 people remain missing, and efforts to locate them are ongoing.

Following the incident, residents of Raghgan Bazaar staged a protest, criticising the inadequate safety measures at Raghgan Dam, which they believe contributed to the tragedy.

== See also ==
- Tanda Dam incident
