= August 2021 Balochistan attacks =

August 2021 Balochistan attacks may refer to:

- August 2021 Quetta bombing
- 26 August 2021 Balochistan attacks

== See also ==
- 2021 Balochistan attacks (disambiguation)
