= Global protests =

Global protests may refer to:

== Specific-focus global protests ==
=== Anti-war ===
- Protests against the Iraq War that started in 2002, including:
  - 15 February 2003 anti-war protests of 6–10 million people in 600 cities in 60 countries
- International protests over the 2021 Israel–Palestine crisis, from 11 May to 20 May.
- Protests against the 2022 Russian invasion of Ukraine, starting in February 2022

=== Pro-climate ===
- School strike for the climate, on 15 March and 24 May 2019 in 100–125 countries
- September 2019 climate strikes on 20 and 27 September 2019 by 4–8 million people in 150 countries
