= Mianwali air base attack =

2023 Terrorist attack on Pakistan Airforce Base in Mianwali Punjab, Pakistan

Mianwali Air Base Attack
- Part of Terrorism in Pakistan
Date	4 November 2023
Location	PAF Base M.M. Alam, Mianwali, Punjab, Pakistan 32°33′47″N 71°34′15″E
Result	Successful operation: All militants killed; 3 non-operational aircraft damaged

Belligerents
Pakistan Air Force	Tehreek-e-Jihad

Strength
	9 militants

Casualties and losses
3 grounded aircraft damaged 1 Fuel tank destroyed	9 militants killed
- Mianwali Airbase

The Mianwali air base attack occurred on November 4, 2023, Pakistan Air Force's PAF Base M.M. Alam, in Mianwali, Punjab, Pakistan, which was the target of an attack by the jihadist group Tehreek-e-Jihad. The Pakistani Armed Forces repelled the attack, killing all nine attackers during the security operation. The attack caused damage to 3 ono-aircraft, but the rest of the aircraft were unharmed. This event heightened national security concerns, as it targeted a critical military installation. (Note: Multiple references:)

== Background ==
=== Context ===
Pakistani defense analysts had recently reported a worrying increase in militant attacks targeting military installations. This coincided with a broader trend of heightened extremist violence within the country since the Taliban's 2021 takeover of Afghanistan. These developments have strained relations between Pakistan and the Taliban government. The Taliban have denied accusations from Pakistan of harboring militant groups, specifically the internationally designated terrorist outfit Tehrik-e-Taliban Pakistan (TTP). Notably, the TTP views the Afghan Taliban as an ally.

=== Prelude ===
Prior to the attack on the air base, the militants had launched two separate attacks on security forces in Pakistan's Khyber Pakhtunkhwa region.

==== Khyber Pakhtunkhwa Province ====
An Intelligence-Based Operation (IBO) in Tirah, Khyber District, resulted in a firefight. One militant was killed, and two were apprehended. Additionally, an improvised explosive device (IED) detonated in the Sarwekai area of South Waziristan District, killing two soldiers.

==== Balochistan Province ====
The day before the air base attack, a separate incident in Balochistan Province resulted in the deaths of 14 soldiers during an ambush. In Dera Ismail Khan, Khyber Pakhtunkhwa, a bomb attack targeted police, killing five people. No group claimed responsibility for these attacks.

== Attack ==
Military reports indicate that an attack targeted Mianwali Training Air Base, a high-security facility of the Pakistan Air Force, at around 3:00 AM on November 4th, 2023. According to the reports, militants breached the perimeter by scaling the walls. By midday, all nine attackers were killed during a security operation. While operational fighter jets stored in concrete hangars remained undamaged, three other non-operational aircraft sustained damage. No information was publicly available regarding casualties among base personnel. Pakistan's Inter-Services Public Relations (ISPR) reported that the attack was swiftly repelled by base security forces.

According to military reports, all nine attackers were killed during the course of the attack. Three were killed by base personnel as they attempted entry, while three others were engaged and killed in a subsequent firefight. The remaining three attackers were killed during clearing operations.

== Aftermath ==
The Pakistan Air Force (PAF) officially reported that the attack resulted in no damage to operational aircraft. However, it did cause damage to three older, non-operational aircraft and destroyed a fuel tank. Separately, India Today examined publicly available satellite imagery of the base. Their analysis suggested potential damage to operational aircraft shelters, though the PAF did not confirm this. The magazine reported that the level of damage to the shelters could indicate a powerful explosion nearby, potentially posing a risk to stored aircraft.

The Tehreek-e-Jihad Pakistan (TJP), an affiliate of the Tehreek-i-Taliban Pakistan (TTP) claimed responsibility for the attack.

== Reactions ==
- Caretaker Prime Minister Anwaar ul Haq Kakar praised the Pakistan Air Force's response to the attack and said that "any attempt to undermine our security will meet with unwavering resistance". President Arif Alvi expressed satisfaction at the failure of the attack and denounced the attackers as enemies of Pakistan.
- Interim interior minister Sarfraz Bugti called the attack part of a conspiracy to destabilize Pakistan and called for unity among state institutions to combat terrorism.
- Former prime minister Shehbaz Sharif, as well as former president and Pakistan People's Party leader Asif Ali Zardari also condemned the attack and praised the security forces for their efforts in countering terrorism.

== Further Investigation ==
The Security agencies of Pakistan, investigated the terrorist attack on the Pakistan Air Force (PAF) base Mianwali, which found that the weapons used by the terrorists were American made. These were the startling revelations which have surfaced in the aftermath of the attack on the PAF Mianwali air base which raised concerns about these weapons origin and availability with the terrorists.

The report showed weapons seized from the militants included RPG-7s, AK-74s, M-4s, and M-16/A4 rifles, all manufactured in the United States. Security experts warn that American-made weapons and ammunition are available in Afghanistan, potentially enabling militant groups to acquire them. The presence of American-supplied weaponry among insurgents raises concerns about the potential misuse of such arms following the US withdrawal from Afghanistan, including their use against Afghanistan. In July, reports indicated the use of American-made weaponry in a terrorist attack on the Zhob Cantonment. This incident presents a significant challenge for the Afghan interim government how to prevent their territory from being used for attacks against Pakistan.

== See also ==
- 2023 Tirah shooting
- 2023 Dera Ismail Khan bombing
- 2023 Gwadar ambush
