= 2021 Mainok attack =

Boko Haram attack in Northeast Nigeria

Mainok attack
- Part of the Boko Haram insurgency
- Location of Borno State in Nigeria
| Date | 25 April 2021 |
| Location | Mainok, Borno State, Nigeria |
| Result | ISWAP victory |

Belligerents
| Nigeria | (Islamic State) ISWAP |

Casualties and losses
| 33 soldiers killed | Unknown |

On 25 April 2021, a large group of ISWAP insurgents killed 33 soldiers in Mainok, a town 36 miles (58 kilometres) west of Maiduguri in Borno State, Nigeria.

== The terror attacks ==
Wearing military camouflage, the militants arrived in four mine-resistant trucks, a scorpion armored personnel carrier, and several gun trucks. They split into three groups before attacking the army base. At the base, ISWAP destroyed a T-55 battle tank, a BTR-4EN, and stole several MRAPs. The attackers fled to their camp around the Lawan Mainari axis, as the air force carried out airstrikes against them. When the ISWAP terrorists were confronted with military planes heading towards them to attack them, they set fire to the police station in Mainok in a rage and then fled to the primary school there.

When soldiers arrived from Damaturu in response, ISWAP ambushed the reinforcements, killing three, injuring nine, and stealing a MRAP. An air force drone accidentally bombed a vehicle belonging to the army, killing 20.

== Afterfights ==
The attack was followed by prolonged and unrelenting fighting in the towns of Geidam, Kumuya and Buni Gari in Yobe province. Intelligence, Surveillance and Reconnaissance (ISR) platforms were deployed in the sky by the NAF.

== See also ==
- Timeline of the Boko Haram insurgency
- List of terrorist incidents in 2021
