= 2021 Chaman bombings =

Terrorist incident in Balochistan, Pakistan

- Part of the insurgency in Balochistan
- Location of Chaman District in Balochistan, Pakistan
- Location: Chaman, Balochistan, Pakistan
- Date: 24 March; 21 May
- Attack type: Bombings
- Weapon: Bombs
- Deaths: 3 on 24 March; 6 on 21 May; 9 in total
- Injuries: 13 on 24 March; 14 on 21 May; 27 in total

The 2021 Chaman bombings were two bombing attacks in Chaman, Balochistan, Pakistan, that occurred on 24 March and 21 May. These attacks left 10 people dead and another 27 injured.

== Background ==
The insurgency in Balochistan is a long-running low-intensity insurgency by Baloch nationalists in southwestern Pakistan and southeastern Iran. Chaman was previously bombed in 2017.

== Bombings ==
=== 24 March ===
A bomb left 3 people dead and another 13 were injured.

The terrorist act involved the detonation of a remote-controlled bomb placed in a motorcycle. The target of the attack was a senior police officer. The explosion occurred as the police car was about to pass the motorcycle. Among the three dead was a child, while two security personnel were among the 13 wounded. The Pakistani Taliban claimed responsibility for the attack.

=== 21 May ===
A bomb killed seven people and another 14 were injured. The attack occurred at a pro-Palestinian protest. 21 May has been declared as Palestine Solidarity Day by the Pakistani government, following the Israeli bombing of Palestinians. To mark the National Day of Solidarity, Jamiat-e-Ulema Islam, one of Pakistan's leading religious political organisations, organised a protest march. The improvised explosive device exploded just as the demonstrators had finished their protest march.

== See also ==
- List of terrorist incidents in 2021
- Terrorist incidents in Pakistan in 2021
- 2021 in Pakistan
