= 2024 Shangla bombing =

Terrorist attack in Pakistan

- Part of the Insurgency in Khyber Pakhtunkhwa, Anti-China terrorism in Pakistan
- Location: 35°19′02.16″N 73°11′35.78″E; Shangla District, Khyber Pakhtunkhwa, Pakistan
- Date: 26 March 2024
- Target: Chinese construction labor of Dasu Dam
- Attack type: Suicide bombing
- Deaths: 7 (including the perpetrator)
- Injuries: 0

On 26 March 2024, in Bisham Tehsil, Shangla District, Khyber Pakhtunkhwa, Pakistan, a suicide bomber attacked a bus transporting five Chinese engineers and their Pakistani driver on their way to the Dasu Dam, killing all of them.

== Incident ==
The bomber rammed an explosive-filled car into the bus that was travelling from Islamabad to Kohistan on the Karakoram Highway. No group took responsibility for the attack. The Taliban-led government of Afghanistan also rejects Afghan involvement in the attack.

This was the third attack on Chinese interests in Pakistan the same week, as a Pakistani naval base and a port used by China were also attacked by Baloch separatists. The Chinese Embassy in Pakistan told Chinese nationals in Pakistan to stay alert.

== Aftermath ==
On 29 March, Chinese investigators arrived in Pakistan to join a probe into the attack. On 1 April, Pakistani police said that they had arrested 12 people in connection with the attack.

On 23 May, the Economic Coordination Committee of the Cabinet decided to pay US$2.58 million to the families of Chinese workers that died in the attack.

== See also ==
- 2021 Upper Kohistan bombing
