= 2021–22 Pakistan federal budget =

2021-2022 Federal Budget
- Submitted by: Shaukat Tareen
- Submitted to: 15th National Assembly
- Presented: 11 June 2021
- Country: Pakistan
- Parliament: Pakistan
- Party: Pakistan Tehreek e Insaf
- Finance minister: Shaukat Tareen
- Treasurer: Ministry of Finance
- Deficit: Rs3.5 trillion
- Debt: US$115.7 billion (external)

The Federal Government of Pakistan has presented the country's budget of Rs. 8400 billion in the National Assembly. This is the third budget presented by the PTI Government; it has been come in power since August 2018. The federal budget has been described by the government as a budget for economic growth.

== Pakistan Economic Survey 2020-21 ==
The Pakistan Economic Survey is an annual report on the performance of the economy, focusing in particular on major macroeconomic indicators.

Finance Minister Shaukat Tarin briefed on 10 June 2021, the Pakistan Economic Survey 2020-21 at a press conference in Islamabad on Thursday, revealing that the industrial and services sectors had helped the economy rebound and post GDP growth of 3.94 per cent in the first 9 months of the fiscal year (July to March), significantly higher than the target of 2.1pc. After last year’s contraction of 0.47pc, the economy witnessed a V-shaped recovery, according to the survey document, which was supported by the industrial and services sectors surpassing the government's expectations, particularly highlighted growth in large-scale manufacturing (LSM) which expanded 9pc.

=== Failure to achieve growth target in the agricultural sector ===
According to the Economic Survey, the performance of the agricultural sector this year was 2.7 per cent as against its budget target of 2.8 per cent. However, with the 3.3% growth in the agricultural sector last year, its performance this year is at a very low level. The decline in the agricultural sector has led to a record decline in cotton production, the country's main crop, which will fall by 22% to 7 million bales in the current fiscal year. Its production in the last financial year was more than 9 million bales. Cotton is the country's main textile export major raw material. According to the Economic Survey, the area under cotton cultivation has also declined in the financial year under review. In the last financial year, cotton was cultivated in an area of 2517 thousand hectares. However, in the current financial year, the area under cotton has decreased by about 17.5 percent and the area under cultivation remained at 2079 thousand hectares. The country saw an increase in the production of other crops grown, but the sector failed to achieve its target due to a record decline in cotton production and lagged behind the growth of more than 3% last year.

=== Decline in foreign investment ===
The government has pointed out in the Economic Survey that foreign investment in Pakistan has declined due to global conditions caused by the corona virus. The Economic Survey shows foreign investment figures for the first nine months of the current fiscal year, valued at about ً 1.4 billion in the July–March period, up from the previous fiscal year. More than 2 billion in those nine months. Most of the foreign investment came from China which was for CPEC projects in Pakistan which is about 47% of the total investment. The volume of investment in Pakistan from other parts of the World has been very low this year.

=== Rising trade deficit ===
The economic survey for the current financial year also mentions Pakistan's growing trade deficit. The survey provides foreign trade data for the first ten months of this financial year, July–April, which shows that the country's trade deficit has increased by more than 21% in those ten months. The country's total imports in these months stood at 42 42.3 billion, up 13.5 percent from $37.3 billion dollars in the same period last fiscal year. During the period under review, the country's exports increased by 6.5 per cent, but the sharp rise in imports wiped out the benefits of the increase in exports. It may be recalled that Pakistan had set a total import target of 42 billion this year, but in ten months, the country's imports exceeded this target, leading to a widening trade deficit. One of the main reasons for the high imports is the import of food items in the country when the government allowed these two commodities to curb the rising prices of sugar and wheat, which had a negative impact on the balance of trade abroad. The Finance Minister has blamed imports of wheat and sugar for the widening trade deficit. Although remittances to the country helped balance the external payments, the widening trade deficit is a sign of a negative trend for the country's foreign trade.

== Budget ==
The incumbent government of Pakistan under Prime Minister Imran Khan has presented its third budget for the Fiscal Year 2021-22. This budget has a value of Rs8.49 trillion, an increase of Rs700 billion over the last budget, and a GDP growth rate target of 4.8 percent. The 2021-22 budget is important as the country has presented positive economic indicators over the last 6 months of the FY21. The Regulatory duty on the import of cocoa paste, butter, and powder will be reduced. This could mean a reduction in the prices of chocolate products and other baked goods. Locally manufactured cars having an engine capacity of 850cc or less will be exempted from value-added tax (VAT) while the sales tax on these cars will also be reduced from 17pc to 12.5pc. Additionally, four-wheelers will also be exempted from federal excise duty. Imports of electric vehicles will be exempted from value-added tax while the sales tax on locally produced electric vehicles will be one per cent. The government will also impose a tax on "on money" for vehicles that are disposed of without registration. "On money" or premium refers to a process whereby impatient buyers with excess cash in hand happily pay extra money to car dealers for instant delivery instead of waiting for months on end. Electronically heated tobacco products (e-cigarettes) will also be brought into the tax net. The federal excise duty on telecommunication will be reduced by 1pc from 17pc applicable previously. Withholding tax (WHT) on telecommunication services will also be reduced to 3pc. The budget document noted that the fruit juice sector faced an "adverse situation" due to the pandemic while the prices of fruit juices had also been increased after the imposition of the federal excise duty. In FY22, the FED on fruit juices will be withdrawals temperatures peak this summer, staying hydrated will cost you less! The threshold for withholding tax on the monthly electricity bill for domestic users who are not on the Active Taxpayers List (ATL) will be reduced from Rs75,000 to 25,000, means a consumer whose electricity bill is Rs25,000 or more and who is not on the ATL will have to pay withholding tax. The withholding tax on cash withdrawals and on non-cash banking transactions will be removed. The withholding tax on domestic air travel will be ended. This could translate into cheaper air travel domestically. Defence budget increased by 44 billion, this year 1370 billion allocated for Defence whereas for education, only 9 billion was allocated, while health received 21.72 billion

== Reaction ==
- Pakistan Muslim League (PML-N) has rejected budget 2021-22, saying the government has failed to provide any relief to the poor segments of society
- Mohammad Pervaiz Malik said, "This budget reflects that the incumbent government lacks vision and roadmap to steer the country out from economic issues."
- The PML-N spokeswoman Maryam Nawaz said the economic survey presented by Finance Minister Shaukat Tarin depicts PTI government's 'anti-people' policies.
- The Pakistan Peoples Party (PPP) has decided to "vehemently oppose" the federal budget in parliament and participate in every protest to be organised against it in the country by any union or association.
- PPP secretary general Nayyar Bokhari said the party had decided to register its protest over "anti-people budget" inside and outside the parliament.
