= Ippi shooting =

Mass shooting in Pakistan

- Part of the insurgency in Khyber Pakhtunkhwa
- Location of Khyber Pakhtunkhwa in Pakistan
- Location: Ippi, North Waziristan, Khyber Pakhtunkhwa, Pakistan
- Date: 22 February 2021; 9:30am (04:30 GMT)
- Target: Aid workers
- Attack type: Mass shooting
- Weapon: Guns
- Deaths: 4
- Injuries: 1
- Perpetrator: Unknown

The Ippi shooting was a mass shooting on 22 February 2021 in North Waziristan, Khyber Pakhtunkhwa, Pakistan.

== Shooting ==
On 22 February 2021, two gunmen on a motorcycle shot and killed four female aid workers travelling in a car in Ippi village of North Waziristan district. The aid workers' driver was injured in the attack.

== See also ==
- List of terrorist incidents in 2021
- List of terrorist incidents in Pakistan since 2001
- Sectarian violence in Pakistan
