= 2023 International Conference on Climate Resilient Pakistan =

Flood aid meeting held in Geneva, Switzerland

- Date: 9 January 2023
- Location: Geneva, Switzerland
- Also known as: 2023 Geneva conference
- Organised by: Government of Pakistan and United Nations
- Participants: 450
- President: Shehbaz Sharif, António Guterres

2023 International Conference on Climate Resilient Pakistan, more commonly referred to as 2023 Geneva conference, was a one-day international conference on aid to Pakistani Government after the devastating floods in 2022. The conference was co-hosted by the Pakistani Government and the United Nations, held on 9 January 2023 in Geneva, Switzerland. Shehbaz Sharif, the Prime Minister of Pakistan, and Antonio Guterres, the Secretary-General of the United Nations, began the one-day conference, the more than 450 attendees including private donors, international financial organizations, and government representatives from around 40 countries.

In the conference, Pakistan presented the “Resilient, Recovery, Rehabilitation, and Reconstruction Framework” (4RF) and seek international support and long-term partnerships for its implementation. The 4RF document covers the funding mechanism and institutional arrangements for its execution in an open, transparent, and collaborative way, and it describes a prioritized and sequenced plan that is set at the federal and provincial levels.

Pakistan had created a Post-Disaster Needs Assessment (PDNA) with assistance from the United Nations system, World Bank Group, Asian Development Bank, and European Union. This estimate places the flood damages at over US$14.9 billion, the economic losses at over US$15.2 billion, and the cost of reconstruction at over US$16.3 billion.

Pakistan raised more money than it had asked at this conference, more than $9 billion, from international financial institutions, donor agencies and development partners for the rehabilitation, recovery and reconstruction of flood-affected areas. Prime Minister Shehbaz had asked for at least $8 billion from Pakistan's international allies over the following three years, to rebuild the nation, while Guterres urged for enormous support to speed up the reconstruction process.

== Background ==
Pakistan's worst natural calamity in decades occurred in 2022 with the devastating floods. They caused about 15,000 deaths or injuries, submerged almost a third of the country, and caused 8 million people to flee their homes. More than 4 million acres of agricultural land, over 2 million dwellings, 13,000 kilometers of roadways, and 439 bridges were all destroyed or damaged. As a direct result of these disasters, an estimated 9 million more people may become poor. Thanks to the UN's aid, the generosity of donors and partners, and the bravery of its citizens, this catastrophic climate calamity has been addressed by the Pakistani government. With the aid of foreign organizations, it gave 2.2 million households $245 million in monetary assistance and delivered hundreds of thousands of food, tents, water, and medications to the needy and the displaced.

After the disaster, massive reconstruction and rehabilitation are required. With assistance from the United Nations system, World Bank Group, Asian Development Bank, and European Union, Pakistan arranged for a "Post-Disaster Needs Assessment" (PDNA), which projects that flood damage will cost more than US$14.9 billion, and reconstruction needs to exceed US$16.3 billion. Works would include rebuilding of private housing, revitalization of livelihoods and agriculture, and restoration of public infrastructure, and the PDNA's major priorities include building roads, bridges, schools, and hospitals. A project "framework", the Resilient, Recovery, Rehabilitation, and Reconstruction Framework (4RF), was built on the outputs of the assessment.

== Agenda and objectives ==
The conference's agenda asked for increased international assistance to rebuild the severely damaged infrastructure and assist the population that was afflicted by 2022's disastrous floods. As per details, the day long conference had to main agendas: Resilient, Rehabilitation, Recovery, and Reconstruction Framework (4RF). To achieve climate resilience, significant talks were held addressing institutional, financial, and implementation arrangement cooperation with other nations and stakeholders. With their opening remarks, Sharif and Guterres officially launched the 4RF while requesting finance commitments from partners and donors.

The conference had two main objectives:

- Lay out a multisector strategy for rehabilitation and rebuilding that is climate resilient and inclusive using the Resilient, Rehabilitation, Recovery, and Reconstruction Framework (4RF).
- Establish long-term collaborations and secure international assistance to strengthen Pakistan's capacity for climate adaptation and resilience.

=== 4RF plan ===
Pakistan presented the document outlining its 4RF strategic policy. It was created by the PDNA with assistance from international organizations. According to the PDNA assessment, there have been approximately $30 billion in overall damages and economic losses, and over $16 billion has been estimated as needed for rehabilitation and resilient reconstruction. The entire disaster recovery plan of the Pakistani government, which included comprised Strategic Recovery Objectives (SRO), a Policy Framework, a Financing Strategy, and Implementation and Monitoring Arrangements, was measured against the 4RF. A segmented and improved method had been identified in order to implement the 4RF plan successfully.

To build governance and state institution capacity in order to restore the lives and livelihoods of impacted people, ensure social inclusion and participation, restore and improve basic services, and rehabilitate physical infrastructure in a resilient and sustainable manner, Knut Ostby, the Pakistan representative for the UN Development Programme, said, "This is a key time for the world community to stand with Pakistan and to commit to a robust and inclusive recovery from these disastrous floods." Sharif had pleaded with the international community to view the damage and the immense destruction brought on by the floods with sympathy and solidarity and to aid in the effort to rebuild better.

== Participation ==
The approximately 450 attendees included representatives from around 40 nations (Heads of state/government, government representatives and high-level representatives), individual contributors, international financial organizations and private donors, as Islamabad asked for assistance in paying for around half of a $16.3 billion recovery cost.

=== High-level attendees ===
As Pakistan sought disaster resilience at a conference sponsored by the UN in Geneva, Turkish President Recep Tayyip Erdoğan, who participated in the conference via video link, expressed Turkey's commitment to the fight against climate change and vowed to stand with Pakistan.

According to the Norwegian Prime Minister Jonas Gahr Støre, who participated in the conference via video link, Pakistan suffered unmatched losses as a result of the calamity. According to him, the international community should act jointly to solve the problem of climate change and assist its victims because the demands of the flood-affected population continue to be extremely great.

Emmanuel Macron, the president of France, who participated in the conference via video link, stated that Paris was prepared to assist Pakistan in its discussions with financial institutions as the nation deals with significant losses from recent floods.

Ignazio Cassis, the Swiss Federal Councilor for Foreign Affairs, said the world should help Pakistan in its hour of need. He claimed that the threat posed by climate change required international action. He expressed his gratitude to UN Secretary-General Antonio Guterres and Prime Minister Shehbaz Sharif for hosting the debate and recalled the Swiss assistance to Pakistan soon after the floods, which included sending a team for relief and restoration.

Ursula von der Leyen, President of the European Commission, who also participated in the conference via video link, stated that we are supporting a comprehensive reconstruction strategy now. Together with our allies, we are working to assist Pakistan get back on track. With our humanitarian aid, Team Europe has contributed almost 500 million euros to Pakistan's reconstruction. And in keeping with our Global Gateway plan, the EU and Pakistan today reached an agreement on a package worth 87 million euros.

== Outcomes ==
For the rehabilitation, recovery, and reconstruction of flood-affected areas, Pakistan obtained more money than it had requested at this conference—more than $9 billion—from international financial institutions, donor agencies, and development partners. At the conference, Prime Minister Shehbaz requested $8 billion from Pakistan's allies over the ensuing three years to rebuild the country, and Guterres called for massive assistance to hasten the process.

A day's end conclusion report stated that delegations recalled their support for emergency relief efforts and reaffirmed their commitment to Pakistan's people for a strong recovery, rehabilitation, and reconstruction. The first plenary of the conference, according to Marriyum Aurangzeb, Minister of Information, culminated in a "generous outpouring" from the world community.

== Action plan ==
Based on the following components, an organized process of support for Pakistan's strong recovery would be implemented:

- Creating and approving specific recovery therapies' comprehensive plans.
- Moving from the short-term to the long-term.
- Framework for long-term resilience.
- Encouraging inclusivity
- Creating a financial plan.
- Project planning.
- Evaluation and monitoring.
- Forming a support group for international partners.

== See also ==
- 2022 Pakistan floods
- List of floods in Pakistan
