= Barkhan triple killing =

- Date: 21 February 2023
- Location: Barkhan District, Balochistan, Pakistan
- Cause: Murder of Granaz, Muhammad Anwar, and Abdul Qadir
- Motive: Unknown
- Perpetrator: Unknown
- Outcome: Protests, formation of Joint Investigation Team
- Deaths: 3
- Suspects: Sardar Abdul Rehman Khetran

The Barkhan triple killing refers to the finding of the bodies of a woman and her two sons, who had been shot and burned, in a well located near Barkhan District in the Balochistan province of Pakistan. This event caused members of the Marri tribe to protest outside the Red Zone in Quetta, the provincial capital. The victims were identified as Granaz, Muhammad Anwar, and Abdul Qadir, and it was believed that they had been held captive in a private prison by Sardar Abdul Rehman Khetran, who was the Balochistan Minister for Communication and Works. The incident sparked widespread outrage on social media and in the Balochistan Assembly. As a result, the Balochistan Minister for Home Affairs, Mir Ziaullah Langau, wrote a letter to law enforcement agencies requesting the safe return of the remaining members of Khan Muhammad Marri's family, who were still missing.

After receiving information from locals, the authorities were notified about the discovery of three bodies in a well. Subsequently, levies personnel and other security officials rushed to the scene and retrieved the bodies. According to the police, the mother and her two sons had been murdered and their bodies were dumped in the well by unknown individuals. The bodies showed signs of torture and had bullet wounds on their heads. Hospital officials in Kohlu who examined the bodies reported that the woman's face was crushed, and the victims' hands and feet were bound with ropes. Abdul Qayoom Bijrani Marri, an heir, was able to identify the bodies.

Sardar Khetran refuted the accusations and dismissed them as a conspiracy, stating that the bodies were found at a distance of one and a half kilometers from his hometown and that he was not present in Barkhan at the time, as he had been in Quetta for over a week. However, Inam Shah, one of Khetran's sons, contradicted his father's statement and confirmed that the woman and her two sons, whose bodies were found in the well, had indeed been detained in his father's private jail. The police then conducted a search of Khetran's residence in order to locate the five children of Khan Muhammad Marri who were still missing.

Following the Barkhan incident, protests erupted with Marri tribesmen staging a sit-in in Quetta. They refused to call off their demonstration or bury the bodies until Prime Minister Shehbaz Sharif paid them a visit. The Balochistan Bar Council also boycotted court proceedings in protest, and a tribal council was called to discuss the matter. Balochistan's Minister for Home Affairs, Mir Ziaullah Langau, formed a Joint Investigation Team (JIT) comprising five members, led by DIG Loralai. The team was assigned the task of submitting its report within 30 days. The case drew the attention of former prime minister Imran Khan, who demanded swift action against the "law of the jungle"."
