= Tanda Dam boat disaster =

2023 accidental drowning in Pakistan

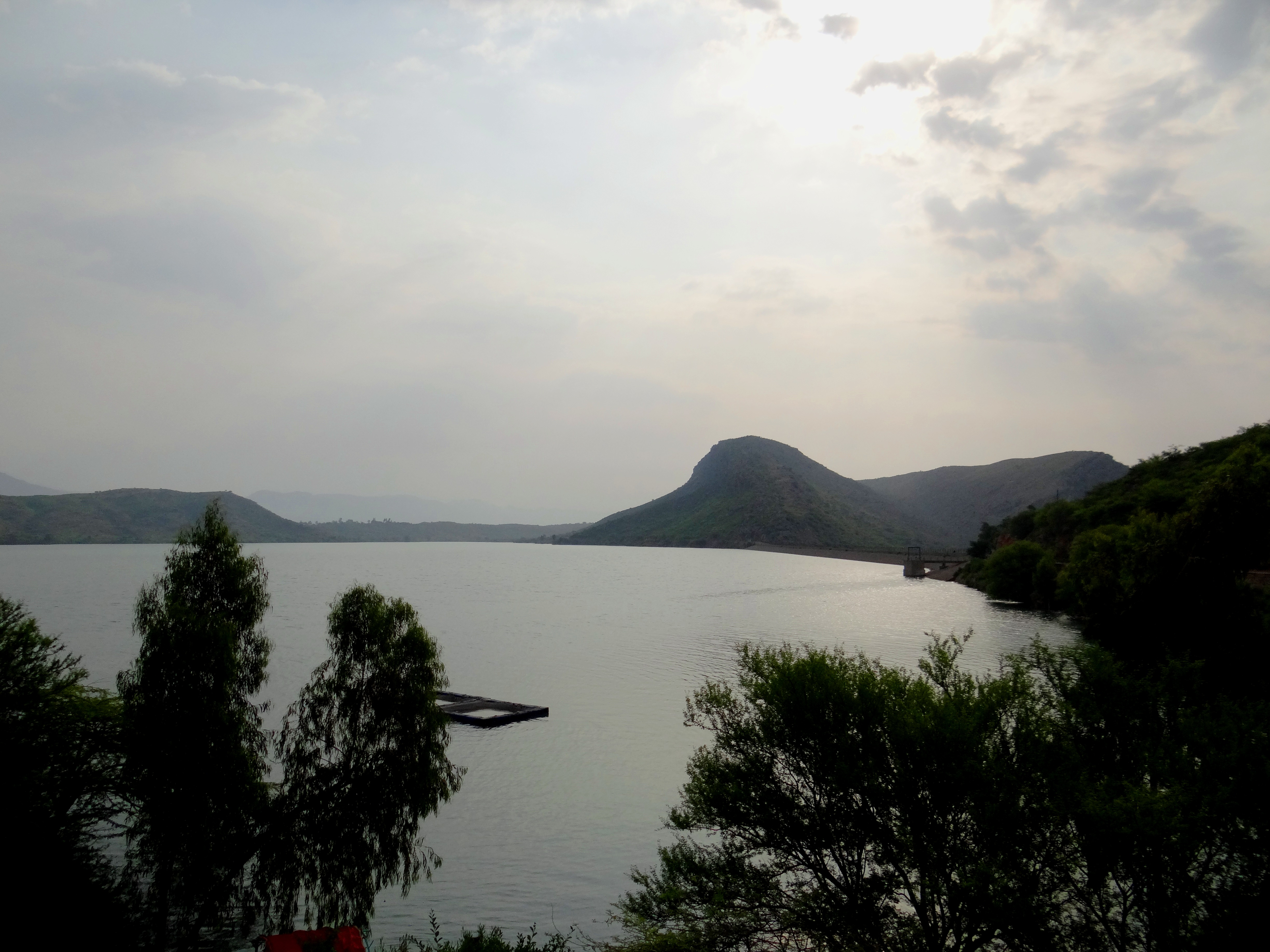
- The lake the dam is located on

Details
- Date: 29 January 2023
- Location: Tanda Dam, Kohat District, Khyber Pakhtunkhwa, Pakistan
- Coordinates: 33.5703°N 71.3980°E
- Country: Pakistan

Statistics
- Passengers: 58
- Deaths: 53
- Injured: 5

On 29 January 2023, children from the villages of Mir Bashkhel and Sulaiman Talab who had gone for a picnic to Tanda Dam in Kohat District, Khyber Pakhtunkhwa, Pakistan, drowned when their boat capsized. Fifty-one children and two adults drowned; five people were rescued – four students and a teacher.
