= Raghagan Dam =

Dam in Pakistan

- Location within Pakistan
- Country: Pakistan
- Location: Bajaur Agency, FATA
- Coordinates: 34°47′26.15″N 71°35′11.26″E
- Status: Under construction
- Construction began: 2013
- Opening date: 30 june 2021
- Construction cost: PKR 483.586 million
- Owner: Government of Pakistan

Dam and spillways
- Type of dam: CGD
- Height: 17 m (56 ft)
- Length: 80 m (260 ft)
- Width (crest): 80 meter
- Width (base): 23 m (75 ft)

Reservoir
- Total capacity: 2609 acre feet

Raghagan Dam is a concrete gravity dam under construction 13 kilometers East of Khaar town, Bajaur District of FATA, Pakistan.

Construction of the dam started in January 2013 and is expected to be completed by June 2021, with a projected cost of PKR 483.586 million. The dam has a height of 17 m (56 ft) and a length of 80 m (260 ft). The dam will irrigate an area of around 1,416 ha (3,500 acres), with total water storage capacity of 1,252 acre-feet.

== See also ==
- List of dams and reservoirs in Pakistan
