= 2023 Karachi factory fire =

Blaze in Sindh, Pakistan

- Date: 12 April 2023
- Location: New Karachi, Karachi, Sindh, Pakistan
- Type: Fire
- Cause: Under investigation
- Outcome: Building collapse during a rescue operation, resulting in fatalities and injuries
- Deaths: 4
- Injuries: 13
- Inquiries: Under investigation

On 12 April 2023, a factory fire took place in Karachi, Sindh, Pakistan's largest city. Four firefighters were killed and 13 others suffered injuries as a result of the fire, which broke out in two factories and left behind significant damage.

== Background ==
Two facilities in Karachi, Pakistan's New Karachi industrial sector, caught fire the night of 12 April 2023. The affected manufacturers produced towels and car parts in their respective industries. Firefighters and rescue workers were rushed in to contain the incident after it quickly spread. Four firefighters were killed and 13 others were hurt when the burned-out buildings of the impacted factories fell during the rescue operation. Firefighters Mohsin, Afzal, Sohail, and Khalid Shehzad were named as the deceased. Eleven firefighters and two other people were among the injured.

== Reactions ==
Government officials and the public have paid close attention to the fire. Governor of Sindh Kamran Tessori expressed his sorrow and stated the firefighters who were killed for their bravery received a prestigious status. Saifur Rehman, the administrator of Karachi, commanded that the injured receive quick medical attention and launched an investigation into the incident.

== See also ==
- 2012 Pakistan factory fires
