= Dasu bus attack =

2021 terrorist attack in Pakistan

Dasu bus incident
- Part of the Insurgency in Khyber Pakhtunkhwa, Anti-China terrorism in Pakistan
- Date: 14 July 2021
- Time: (UTC+05:00)
- Location: Upper Kohistan District, Khyber Pakhtunkhwa, Pakistan
- Type: Suicide bombing
- Perpetrator: Pakistani Taliban
- Deaths: 14 (including the perpetrator)
- Injuries: 28

On 14 July 2021, a bus carrying Chinese workers in the Dasu area of Upper Kohistan District, Pakistan, fell into a ravine after an explosion, killing 13 people, including nine Chinese citizens and four Pakistanis, and injuring 28 others.

== The bombing ==
The bomb was detonated near a hydroelectric project where Chinese and Pakistani workers had been laboring together for several years. The bus fell into a ravine as a result of the attack. The injured were taken by ambulance helicopters to a hospital in Dasu city, 10 km away. Muhammad Hasnain and Muhammed Ayaz, who were identified as Pakistani Taliban members and masterminds of the attack, were arrested and sentenced to death in November 2022.

== Reactions ==
On 12 August 2021, Pakistani Foreign Minister Shah Mahmood Qureshi said that Afghanistan's soil was used for the terrorist attack and the investigators were looking traces of its planning and that the perpetrators had met meeting with NDS and RAW revealing an "Indian-Afghan nexus."

The same day, Khyber-Pakhtunkhwa Counter-Terrorism Department (CTD) DG Javed Iqbal, said that Dasu attack was a suicide attack and it was done by attackers from Afghanistan. He identified Khalid aka Sheikh as the bomber and said he was a resident of Afghanistan. DG Javed Iqbal had identified Muhammad Tariq Rafiq, a commander of Tehrik-e-Taliban Pakistan, as the main mastermind behind the attack.

== Response ==
The main mastermind of the attack, Muhammad Tariq Rafiq, was killed in Paich Dara, Kunar Province, Afghanistan on 12 July 2023. Muhammad Tariq Rafiq was highly wanted commander of Tehrik-e-Taliban Pakistan and was responsible for number of terrorist attacks in Pakistan including the Dasu bus attack.

On 12 November 2022, an anti-terrorism court in Pakistan sentenced both Muhammad Hussain and Muhammad Ayaz to death for their involvement in the attack.

== See also ==
- Gwadar suicide attack
- Shangla suicide attack
