= Rana Maqbool Ahmad =

Pakistani politician (1948–2023)

Senator Rana Maqbool Ahmad
- رانا مقبول احمد

Member of the Senate of Pakistan
- In office 12 March 2018 – 12 September 2023

Inspector General of Sindh Police
- In office 30 October 1998 – 12 October 1999

Personal details
- Born: 1 November 1948 Jaranwala, Faisalabad, Punjab, Pakistan
- Died: 12 September 2023 (aged 74) Lahore, Punjab, Pakistan
- Party: Pakistan Muslim League (N)

Rana Maqbool Ahmad (1 November 1948 – 12 September 2023) was a Pakistani police officer and politician who served as the Inspector General of Sindh Police from 1998 to 1999. He also served as Special Secretary Prosecution Punjab and later a member of the Senate of Pakistan from 2018 to 2023.

== Political career ==
Ahmad was nominated by Pakistan Muslim League (N) (PML-N) as its candidate in the 2018 Pakistani Senate election. However, the Election Commission of Pakistan declared all PML-N candidates for the Senate election as independent after a ruling of the Supreme Court of Pakistan.

Ahmad was elected to the Senate of Pakistan as an independent candidate on a general seat from Punjab. He was supported in the election by PML-N and joined the treasury benches, led by PML-N after getting elected. He took oath as a Senator on 12 March 2018.

Rana Maqbool was affiliated with PML-N and a school in Samnabad, Lahore is named after him.

== Death ==
Rana Maqbool Ahmad died on 12 September 2023, at the age of 72.
