= Eighth Extraordinary Session of the Islamic Summit Conference =

Organisation of Islamic Cooperation conference

Eighth Extraordinary Session of the Islamic Summit
- 17 December 2021
- Host country: Pakistan
- Cities: Islamabad

The Eighth Extraordinary Session of the Islamic Summit Conference was a conference organized by the Organisation of Islamic Cooperation (OIC) in Islamabad on 17 December 2021.

== Background ==
The session was organized in the wake of the Afghan Taliban's takeover of Afghanistan following the Fall of Kabul, and the humanitarian and economic crisis which followed. USA and the European countries did not recognize the Taliban regime, and imposed strict economic sanctions on the Taliban, and had restricted access to Afghan assets and development funds worth billions of dollars.

These sanctions led to fears of an economic and humanitarian emergency in the country. In October 2021, the United Nations estimated that, based on reports by Food and Agriculture Organization and World Food Programme, around 22.8 million Afghans were in danger of being affected by food shortage and loss of livelihood.

It was held in Islamabad at the request of Saudi Arabia, which chaired the OIC.

== See also ==
- Islamic Conference of Information Ministers
- First Extraordinary Session of the Islamic Summit Conference
