= 2023 Astore avalanche =

Disaster in Gilgit-Baltistan, Pakistan

- Date: 27 May 2023
- Location: Astore District, Gilgit-Baltistan, Pakistan
- Cause: Avalanche
- Deaths: At least 11
- Injuries: 13

On 27 May 2023, an avalanche occurred in the Shounter Top Pass, Astore District, Gilgit-Baltistan, Pakistan. The disaster killed at least 11 people and injured 13 more. A Gujjar family, a group of 25 individuals who were traveling with their cattle from Kashmir to Astore when they were struck by the avalanche, were the main victims of the disaster.

== Rescue operation ==
Numerous organizations, notably Rescue 1122, as well as the district administration and the local community, immediately began rescue efforts. At the time of the report, eight bodies had been located, while search for other fatalities was ongoing. Twelve of the injured were reportedly in critical condition when they were sent directly to District Headquarters (DHQ) Hospital Astore. A military unit of the Pakistani Army called Force Command Northern Areas provided aid in the form of supplies, paramedics, and helicopter services, but they were unable to reach the disaster site due to unfavorable weather.

== Reactions ==
Following the disaster, Prime Minister Shehbaz Sharif expressed his condolences to the victims and their families. He emphasized that the occurrence of such incidents were increasing due to climate change in Pakistan and called upon the international community to fulfill its responsibility in protecting developing countries like Pakistan from the adverse effects of climate change.

GB Chief Minister Khalid Khurshid Khan also expressed deep sorrow over the loss of lives and instructed local authorities to expedite rescue operations. He urged relevant officials to promptly investigate the incident and take appropriate measures to prevent similar tragedies in the future.
