= September 2021 Quetta bombing =

Terrorist incident in Pakistan

2021 Quetta suicide attack
- Location: Quetta, Balochistan, Pakistan
- Date: 5 September 2021
- Target: FC checkpost
- Deaths: 4
- Injuries: 20
- Perpetrator: Tehreek-e-Taliban Pakistan

On 5 September 2021, in Quetta, a terrorist on a motorcycle targeted a check post on Mastung Road, killing 4 FC personnel and injuring 20 others.

== The bombing ==
Police said the attack was carried out by a suicide bomber who drove his motorbike packed with six kilograms of explosives into a convoy of a law enforcement agency vehicle. Police and law enforcement agencies immediately began an investigation at the scene of the blast, led by a bomb squad. Emergency services arrived on the scene shortly after the explosion. According to police officials, the injured were shifted to Combined Military Hospital (CMH) and Sheikh Khalifah Bin Zayyad Hospital for medical treatment.

Prime Minister Imran Khan, Federal Human Rights Minister Shireen Mazari, Governor Balochistan Syed Zahoor Ahmad Agha, Shahbaz Shareef and others condemned the suicide attack.

== Claim of responsibility ==
TTP claimed the responsibility, which, according to Shireen Mazari, was sponsored by the RAW.

== See also ==
- Quetta Serena Hotel bombing
- August 2021 Quetta bombing
- 2022 Quetta suicide attack
- Quetta attacks
- Terrorist incidents in Pakistan in 2021
