= Shams Buneri =

Pakistani Pashto poet (1946–2023)

- Born: 1946; Pakistan
- Died: 2 August 2023 (aged 77)
- Occupations: Poet, writer, scholar, Secretary Culture ANP

Shams Buneri (1946 – 2 August 2023) was a Pakistani Pashtun nationalist, progressive, revolutionary poet, writer, and scholar who served as Secretary of Culture for the Awami National Party (ANP).

Throughout his life, he was recognized for his revolutionary poetry and active political engagement, which led to him living in self-imposed exile in Afghanistan for a considerable period and facing imprisonment in various Afghan prisons. Within Pashto literature, he earned the title of "Poet of the Prison" due to his experiences.

Buneri was politically associated with Awami National Party (ANP) and served as secretary of culture for the party.

== Death ==
Shams Buneri died on 1 August 2023, at the age of 77. His funeral prayers were held at Ghazi Khana Buner District the following day.

== Selected works ==
- Shams, Buneri. د زندان یادونه [Prison memories] (in Pashto). OCLC 31902237.
- Būnerī, Shams (2012). د زندان رڼا / Da zandān raṇā [Prison light] (in Pashto). University Book Agency يونيورسټى بک ايجنسى. OCLC 890462882.
- Būnerī, Shams (2021). Kāne kāne zhwand (in Pashto) (1 ed.). Mafkūrah, Peṣhawar. OCLC 1375331223.
- Būnerī, Shams (2022). Zama daghah shāʻirī dah (in Pashto) (1 ed.). OCLC 1350439519.
- Būnerī, Shams (2014). دغه سجدې مې تا ته وې و کۀ نا ؟ / Daghah sajde me tā tah we aw kạh nā? [These prostrations were for you or not?] (in Pashto). يونيورسټى بک ايجنسى, University Book Agency Peṣhawar. OCLC 884500632.
- Būnerī, Shams (1987). Da zhwand naghme [Songs of life] (in Pashto) (1 ed.). OCLC 57439904.
- Būnerī, Shams (1985). Da ṣabā sundare [Morning songs] (in Pashto). OCLC 498715853.
