= Killing of Usama Nadeem Satti =

On 1 January 2021, 22 years old Usama Nadeem Satti was shot dead by Pakistan's Anti-Terrorism Squad (ATS) personnel in the G-10/4 area between Friday and Saturday night.

Satti's family and a large number of students protested in front of the National Press Club. Protestors demanded punishment of the culprits and Satti's parents called on Prime Minister Imran Khan to ensure a fair investigation.

The Joint Investigation Team (JIT) has confirmed that Osama Nadeem Satti was killed by Islamabad capital police officials.

== See also ==
- List of unsolved murders (2000–present)
