= List of terrorist incidents in 2021 =

This is a list of terrorist incidents in 2021, including attacks by violent non-state actors for political motives. Note that terrorism related to drug wars and cartel violence is not included. Ongoing military conflicts are listed separately.

== Guidelines ==
- To be included, entries must be notable (have a stand-alone article) and described by a consensus of reliable sources as "terrorism".
- List entries must comply with the guidelines outlined in the manual of style under MOS:TERRORIST.
- Casualties figures in this list are the total casualties of the incident including immediate casualties and later casualties (such as people who succumbed to their wounds long after the attacks occurred).
- Casualties listed are the victims. Perpetrator casualties are listed separately (e.g. x (+y) indicate that x victims and y perpetrators were killed/injured).
- Casualty totals may be underestimated or unavailable due to a lack of information. A figure with a plus (+) sign indicates that at least that many people have died (e.g. 10+ indicates that at least 10 people have died) – the actual toll could be considerably higher. A figure with a plus (+) sign may also indicate that over that number of people are victims.
- If casualty figures are 20 or more, they will be shown in **bold**. In addition, figures for casualties more than 50 will also be **underlined**.
- Incidents are limited to one per location per day. If multiple attacks occur in the same place on the same day, they will be merged into a single incident.
- In addition to the guidelines above, the table also includes the following categories:

0 people were killed/injured by the incident.
1–19 people were killed/injured by the incident.
20–49 people were killed/injured by the incident.
50–99 people were killed/injured by the incident.
100+ people were killed/injured by the incident.

== List ==
Total incidents: 25

Date	Type	Dead	Injured	Location	Article	Details	Perpetrator	Part of
3 January	Stabbing	11	0	Machh, Pakistan	Machh attack	11 miners in Balochistan belonging to the Shi'ite Hazara sect were blindfolded and tied up before having their throats slit.	Islamic State – Khorasan Province	Insurgency in Balochistan
6 January	Semi-coordinated rioting, assault, attempted coup d'état, attempted bombing	1-5 (+4)	174 (+???)	Washington, D.C., United States	January 6 United States Capitol attack	Following the 2020 United States presidential election, in which Joe Biden defeated incumbent Donald Trump, conspiracy theories spread by Trump and his supporters accused Biden of voter-fraud and had launched various campaigns to overturn the election. On 6 January, the day the electoral votes were to be certified, Donald Trump held a rally calling on his supporters to fight. Soon afterwards, thousands of rioters, as well as organized far-right/neo-fascist militias, stormed the United States Capitol building in an attempt to overturn the election in a self-coup. The rioters/militiamen damaged the interior (including both chambers and several offices like the one belonging to Speaker of the House Nancy Pelosi), looted, clashed with police officers/security, and raised various far-right flags and messages, including the Confederate flag and the Nazi flag. A planner of the attack had also placed bombs outside the building the night prior, however they never detonated. One rioter was shot to death by police, one died of a drug overdose, and two more died from natural causes. Police officer Brian Sicknick was sprayed with pepper-spray during the attack, which triggered a stroke the following day, killing him. Four more police officers would commit suicide due to the trauma of the event. Overall, 174 officers were injured (including 15 requiring hospitalizations), as well as an unknown amount of attackers. 1,500+ rioters were charged, and Trump was both impeached and indicted, although he wasn't removed from office and faced no long-term punishment. Four years later, after Trump had been re-elected president, he pardoned most of the rioters.	Various far-right/neo-fascist groups (most notably Proud Boys and Oath Keepers) and election denying rioters led by then outgoing president Donald Trump.	Attempts to overturn the 2020 United States presidential election Domestic terrorism in the United States
21 January	Suicide bombing	32 (+2)	110	Baghdad, Iraq	January 2021 Baghdad bombings	Two suicide bombers attacked an open-air market.	Islamic State	Islamic State insurgency in Iraq
21 March	Mass shooting	137	Unknown	Tahoua Region, Niger	2021 Tahoua attacks	Armed jihadists indiscriminately shot at people in the villages of Intazayane, Bakorat, and Wirsnat, as well as several other hamlets and camps throughout the Tahoua region.	Islamic State in the Greater Sahara	Jihadist insurgency in Niger
24 March – 5 April	Arson, beheadings, looting, mass shooting	1190+ (+41)	Unknown	Palma, Mozambique	Battle of Palma	Islamists invaded the city in Cabo Delgado Province, killing dozens of people before government forces regained control days later. Palma was left destroyed, and a major oil and gas company decided to suspend all operations in the area.	Ansar al-Sunna; Islamic State – Central Africa Province	Insurgency in Cabo Delgado
28 March	Suicide bombing	0 (+2)	20	Makassar, Indonesia	2021 Makassar cathedral bombing	Two suspected suicide bombers attacked the Sacred Heart Cathedral during Palm Sunday service. The attack was allegedly carried out by the Islamic terrorist group Jamaah Ansharut Daulah.		Terrorism in Indonesia
5 April	Prison escape	0	0	Owerri, Nigeria	Owerri prison break	A large group of armed men used explosives to break into a prison in Imo State, freeing 1,844 inmates.		Insurgency in Southeastern Nigeria
21 April	Car bombing	5	11	Quetta, Pakistan	Quetta Serena Hotel bombing	A car bomb exploded in the car park of the luxury Serena Hotel in Balochistan's capital.	Tehrik-i-Taliban Pakistan	Terrorism in Pakistan
23 April	Stabbing	1 (+1)	0	Rambouillet, France	Rambouillet knife attack	A man stabbed an admin worker to death at the police station in which she worked in Yvelines, Île-de-France. Police shot him dead at the scene. Europol classified the attack as jihadist terrorism.	Lone wolf	Islamic terrorism in Europe
25 April	RPG attack	31	Unknown	Mainok, Nigeria	Mainok attack	A group of jihadists arrived in trucks and used rocket-propelled grenades to attack an army convoy and base in Borno State.	ISWAP	Boko Haram insurgency
3 May	Arson, mass shooting	30	20	Kodyel, Burkina Faso	Kodyel attack	About 100 insurgents burnt homes and shot residents in a village in Foutouri, Komondjari Province, Est Region		
6 May	Arson, bombing	0	6	Malé, Maldives	Attempted assassination of Mohamed Nasheed	An assassination attempt was made against Mohamed Nasheed near his home in Malé. A homemade explosive device planted on a parked motorcycle exploded, injuring Nasheed and four others. The arrested suspects denied being involved; all three of them had prior criminal records.	Al-Qaeda	
8 May	Car bombing	90	240	Kabul, Afghanistan	2021 Kabul school bombing	Bombing of a school in a neighborhood frequently attacked by militants belonging to the regional Islamic State of Iraq and the Levant – Khorasan Province.	Islamic State-Khorasan Province	War in Afghanistan
23 May	Mass shooting	18	0	San Miguel del Ene, Peru	San Miguel del Ene attack	Shooting in a red-light zone bar of Vizcatán del Ene District, Satipo Province. Along with the corpses, some of which were burned, leaflets described the attack as a social cleansing operation.	Shining Path	Internal conflict in Peru
4–5 June	Mass shooting	174	Unknown	Solhan and Tadaryat, Burkina Faso	Solhan and Tadaryat massacres	In the evening of 4 June, 13 civilians and a soldier were killed in an attack at the village of Tadaryat in Yagha Province, Sahel Region. The attackers also raided the communities motorbikes and cattle. Hours later in the early morning of 5 June, insurgents attacked Solhan village in Yagha, killing around 138 civilians.		Jihadist insurgency in Burkina Faso
19 July	Suicide bombing	35 (+1)	60	Baghdad, Iraq	July 2021 Baghdad bombing	A suicide bomber attacked Shias at a market in Sadr city.	Islamic State	Islamic State insurgency in Iraq|-
26 August	Suicide bombing	183	200+	Kabul, Afghanistan	2021 Kabul airport attack	A suicide bombing occurred near Abbey Gate at Hamid Karzai International Airport. Among the dead were 13 US service members, two British nationals and a child of a British national.	Islamic State - Khorasan Province	War in Afghanistan
3 September	Stabbing	0 (+1)	7	Auckland, New Zealand	2021 Auckland Countdown stabbing	Stabbing at the LynnMall Countdown supermarket in New Lynn. The attacker was being followed by police who shot and killed him.	Islamist (suspected)	Terrorism in New Zealand
15 October	Stabbing	1	0	Leigh-on-Sea, England	Murder of David Amess	MP David Amess was stabbed multiple times outside a constituency surgery meeting in Leigh-on-Sea, Essex. The attacker was found guilty of murder and preparing acts of terrorism.	Ali Harbi Ali	Terrorism in the United Kingdom
7 November	Drone strike	0	6	Baghdad, Iraq	Attempted assassination of Mustafa Al-Kadhimi	Attempt to assassinate Iraqi Prime Minister, Mustafa Al-Kadhimi.	Kata'ib Hezbollah (suspected)	Iraqi conflict
14 November	Bombing	0 (+1)	1	Liverpool, England	Liverpool Women’s Hospital bombing	An explosion occurred inside a taxi outside the main entrance of the Liverpool Women’s Hospital which was detonated by the passenger, who was killed. The taxi driver was injured in the explosion.	Lone-wolf	Terrorism in the United Kingdom
21 November	Shooting	1 (+1)	4	Jerusalem	2021 Jerusalem shooting	A gunman opened fire on civilians before he was shot dead by the police.	Hamas	Israeli–Palestinian conflict
25 November	Suicide car bombing	8	17	Mogadishu, Somalia	November 2021 Mogadishu bombing	A suicide car bomb exploded outside a school as an African Union Mission to Somalia convoy drove through.	Al-Shabaab	Somali Civil War
30 November	mass shooting, school shooting	4	7	Oxford, United States	2021 Oxford High School shooting	A teenager opened fire on the students of the high school.	Ethan Crumbley	
3 December	Mass shooting, arson	31	18	Mopti Region, Mali	Mopti bus massacre	A bus carrying civilians was attacked by unknown militants.	Islamists (suspected)	Mali War

== See also ==
- List of terrorist incidents linked to the Islamic State
- Terrorist incidents in Iraq in 2021
