= International protests over the 2021 Israel–Palestine crisis =

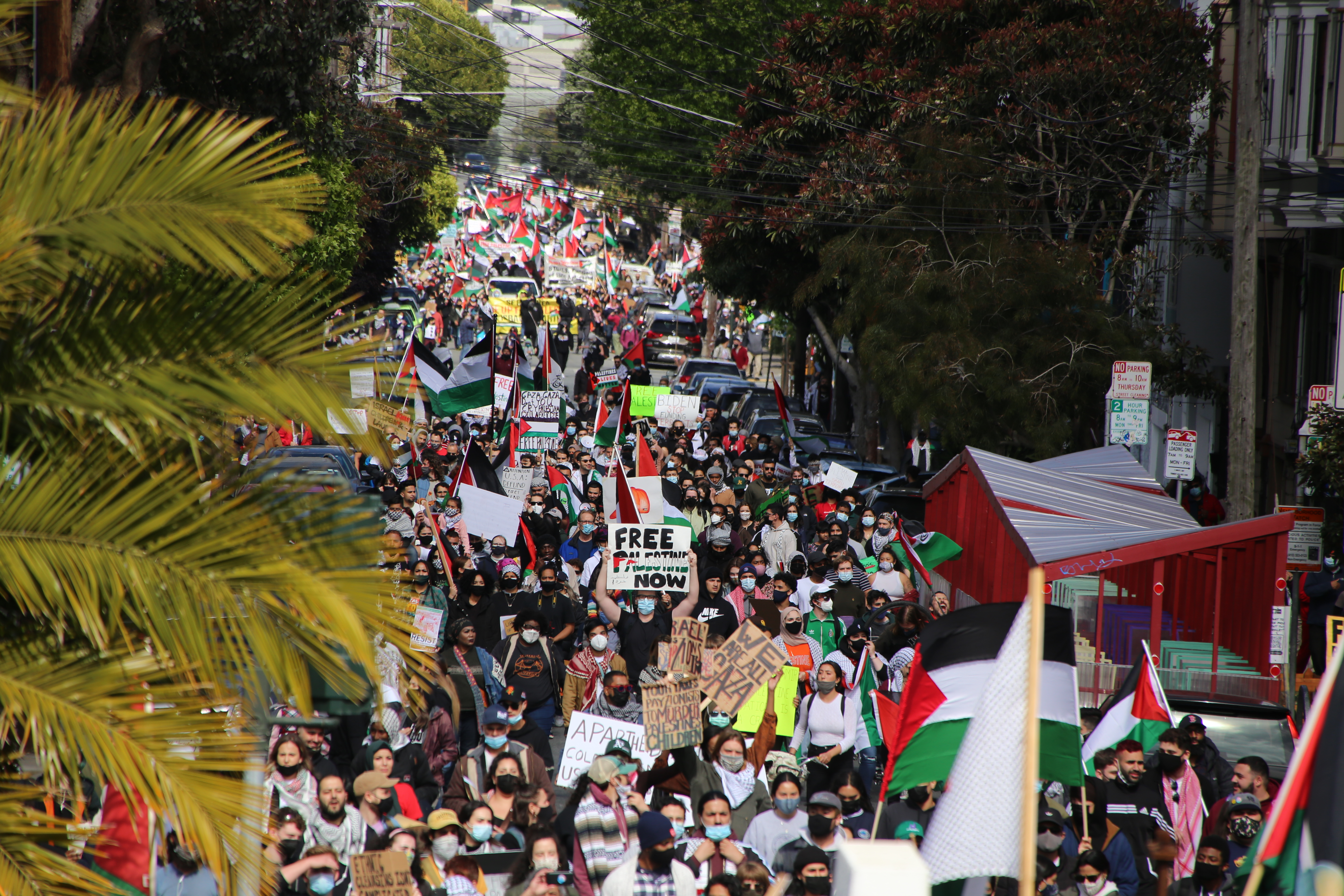
A pro-Palestinian demonstration in San Francisco on 16 May 2021

There were a series of international protests over a May 2021 flare-up of the Israeli–Palestinian conflict. A ceasefire of the hostilities was agreed upon on 20 May.

== May 2021 ==
=== 9 May ===
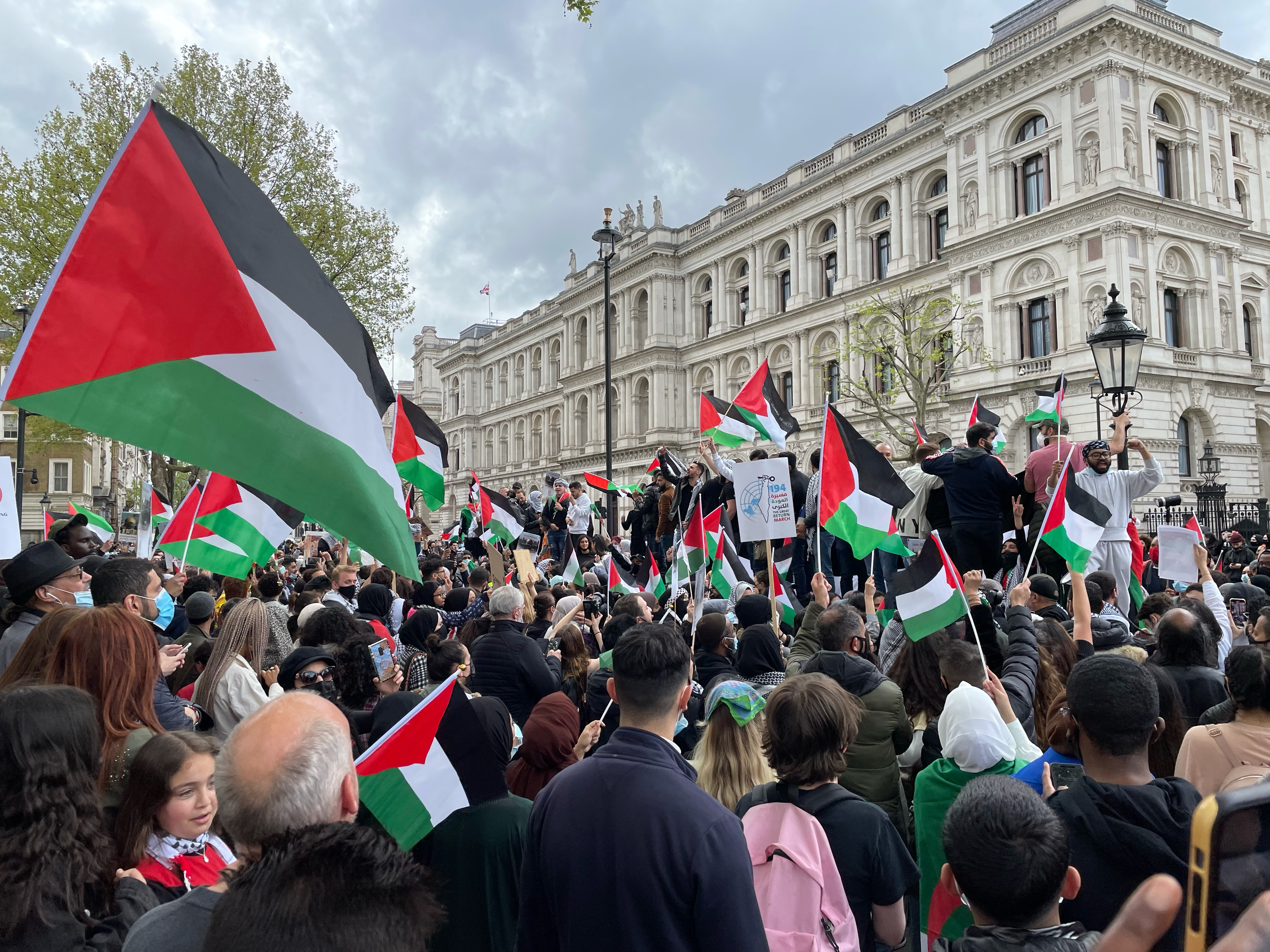
A pro-Palestinian demonstration near the Prime Minister's office in London, England, on 9 May 2021

- The Muslim Association of Britain organised protests in London, Manchester, Birmingham, and Bradford, in opposition to the potential evictions.
- Thousands of Jordanians protested outside the Israeli embassy in Amman.

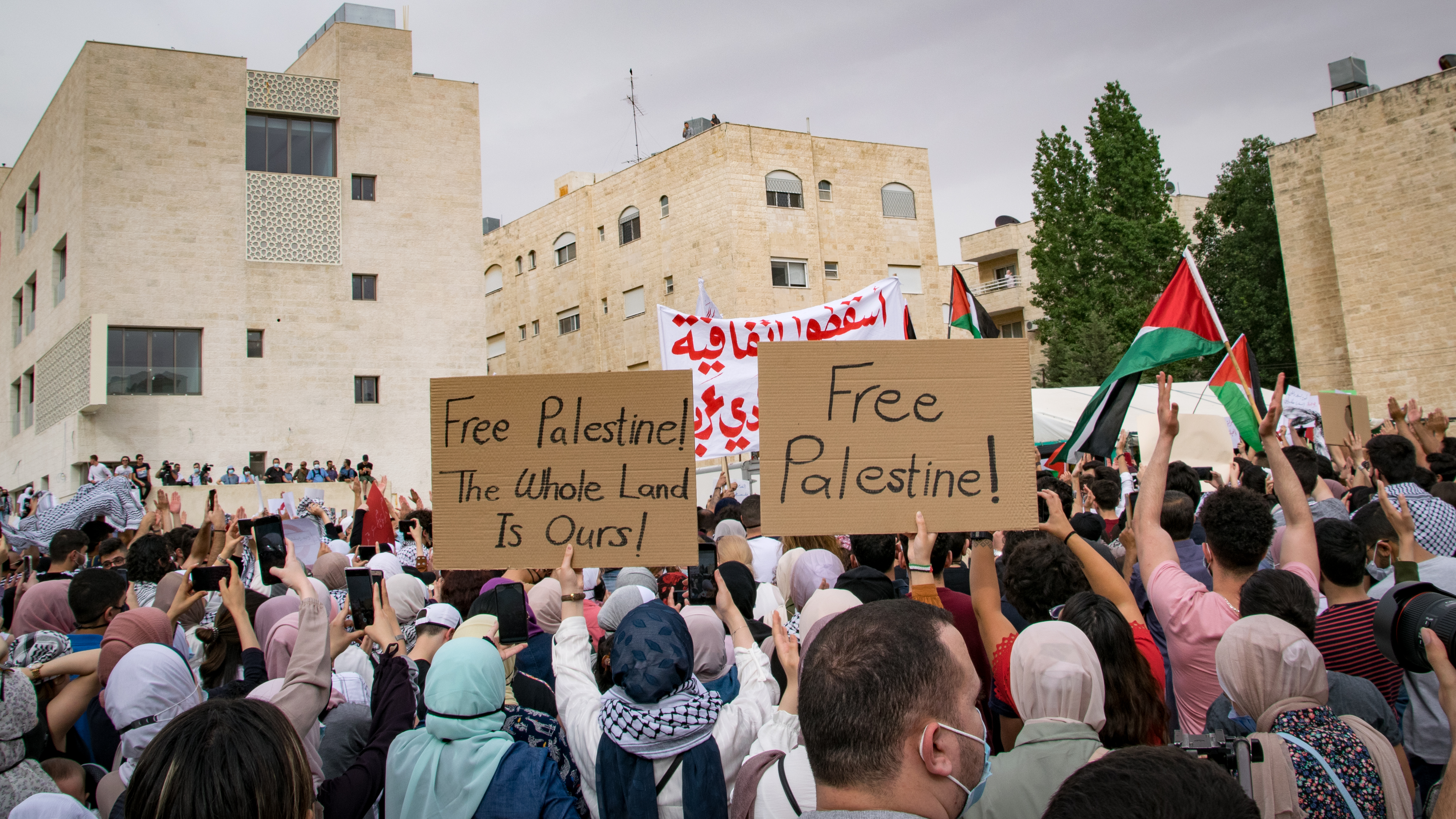
A pro-Palestinian demonstration in Amman, Jordan on 9 May 2021

=== 10 May ===
- Thousands of Turks, Syrians, and Palestinians protested outside the Israeli consulate in Istanbul. Protesters gathered in Turkey despite the complete closure due to COVID-19, with Palestinian and Turkish flags in their hands, "Turkish army go to Gaza!" shouted slogans in the form.

=== 11 May ===
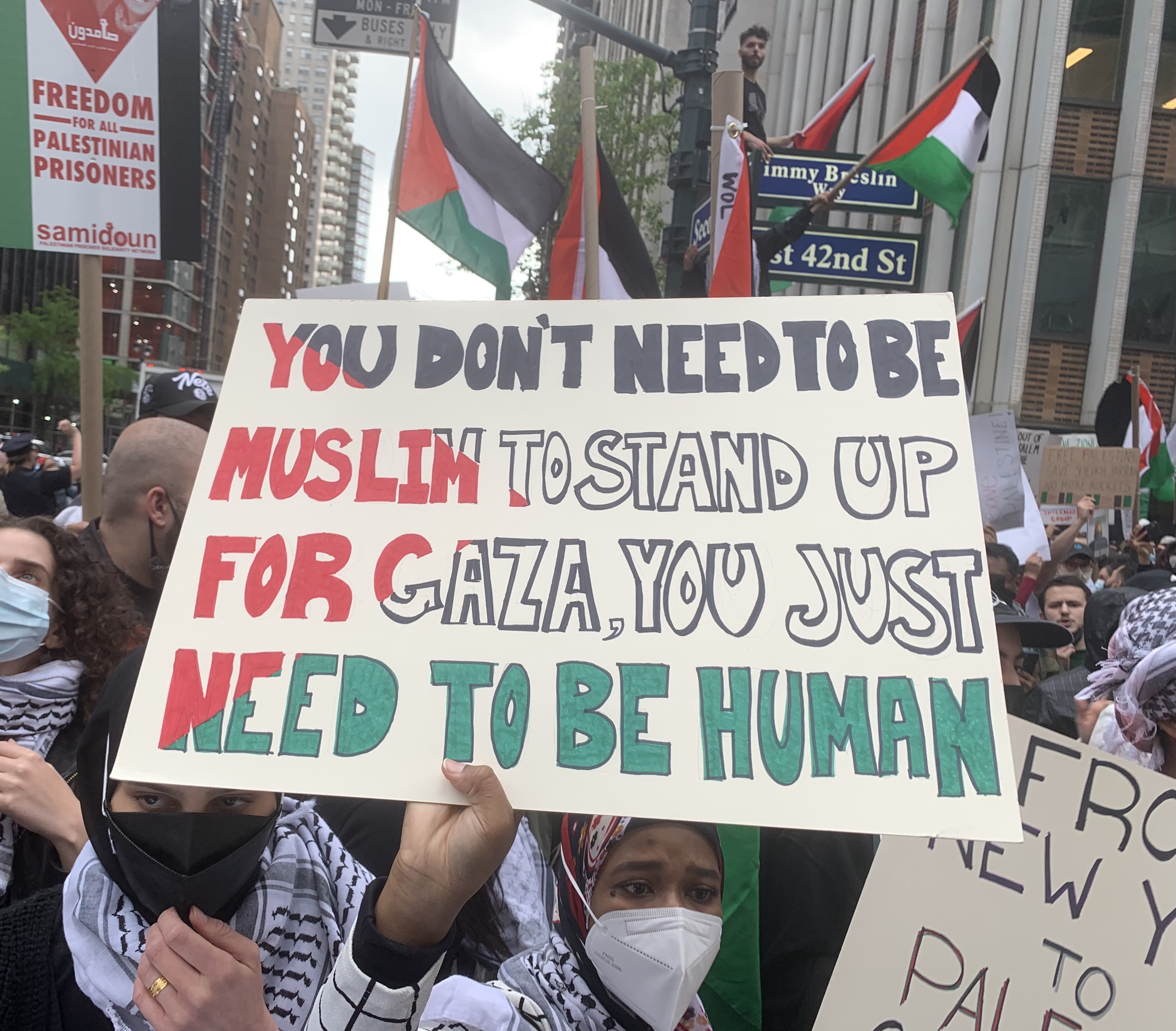
A pro-Palestinian demonstration in New York City on 11 May 2021

- Hundreds of South Africans held a pro-Palestinian protest in Cape Town.
- Hundreds of protesters held a pro-Palestinian protest in Brighton.
- Pro-Israeli and pro-Palestinian protests were held in Manhattan.
- A pro-Palestinian demonstration was held on Constitution Avenue in Washington, D.C.
- The Council on American–Islamic Relations (CAIR) and American Muslims for Palestine organised a pro-Palestinian protest outside the State Department in Washington, D.C. The protest was attended by Representatives Rashida Tlaib and André Carson.
- About 200 people held a pro-Palestinian demonstration outside the Israeli embassy in Stockholm, Sweden. A pro-Palestinian demonstration in Gothenburg also gathered around 200 people. Police tried to break up both demonstrations.

=== 12 May ===
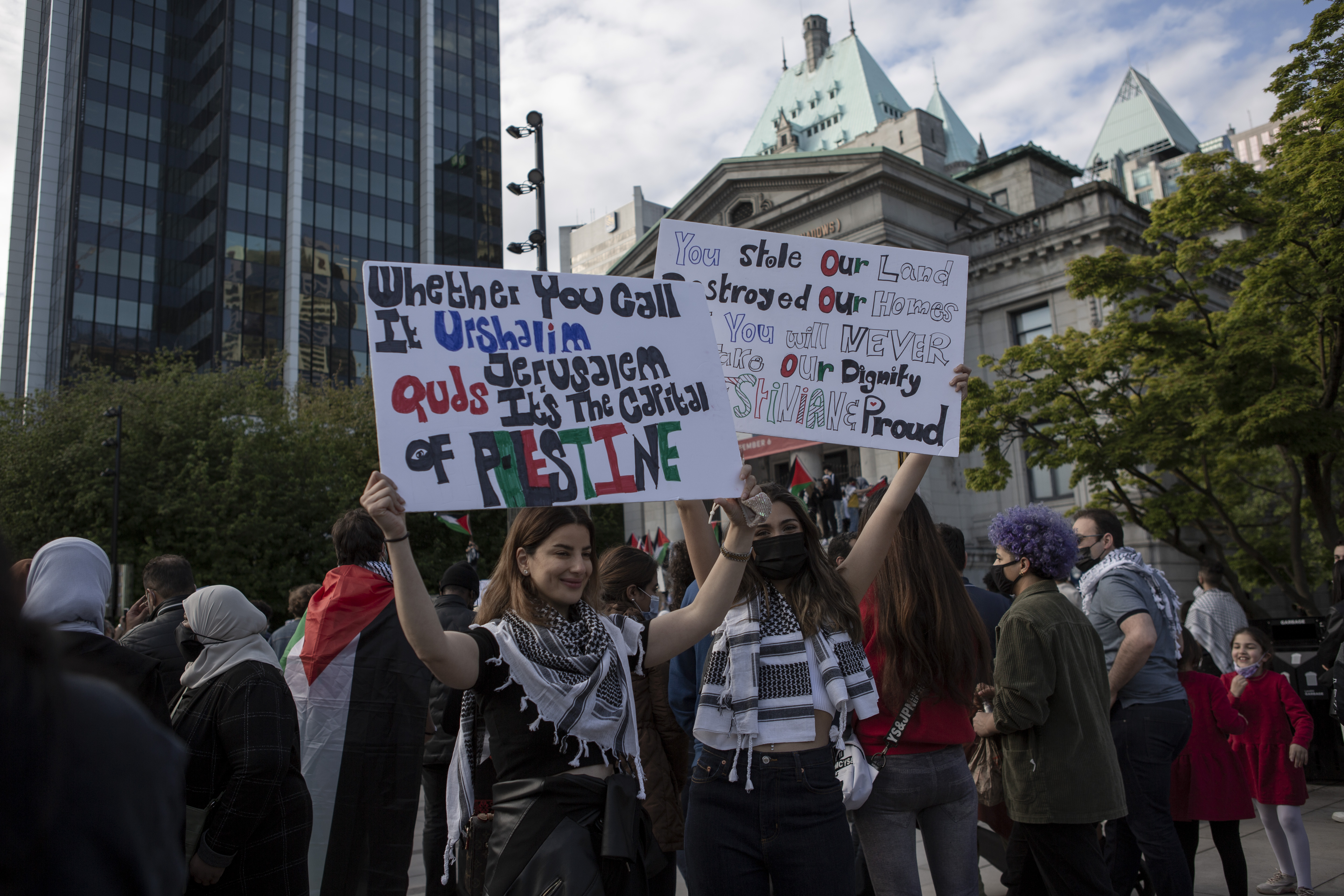
A pro-Palestinian demonstration in Vancouver, Canada, on 12 May 2021

- A pro-Israeli demonstration was held in Rome, Italy.
- Protesters gather in Paris, France, in support of Palestine following attacks on Al-Aqsa and the Gaza Strip. During the protest, police dispersed crowds.
- Protests broke out in Chicago, Illinois, at the Chicago Loop in opposition to Israel's occupation.
- In Milwaukee, protesters gather near The Calling sculpture in opposition to Israel's occupation.
- Pro-Israeli and pro-Palestinian protestors gathered for a second day, in Manhattan. Protestors also gathered outside the Israeli consulate of New York City.

=== 13 May ===
- Over 3,000 people gathered in Piazza del Duomo, Milan, in support of Palestine
- Kenya Police fired tear gas at a group of crowds protesting the Israeli bombing of the Gaza Strip in Nairobi.

=== 14 May ===
- Jordan police dispersed protesters who were trying to reach the Allenby Bridge near the border with Israel. Additionally, protesters from Lebanon also reached the Israeli border.
- Pro-Palestinian protesters stormed the Queensway tunnel in the United Kingdom, disrupting traffic.
- Over 600 people, including Uyghurs, gather at the Tokyo Mosque in Japan to protest Israel's occupation of the Gaza Strip.
- Protesters march in Berlin, Germany, to show solidarity with Palestine.

=== 15 May ===
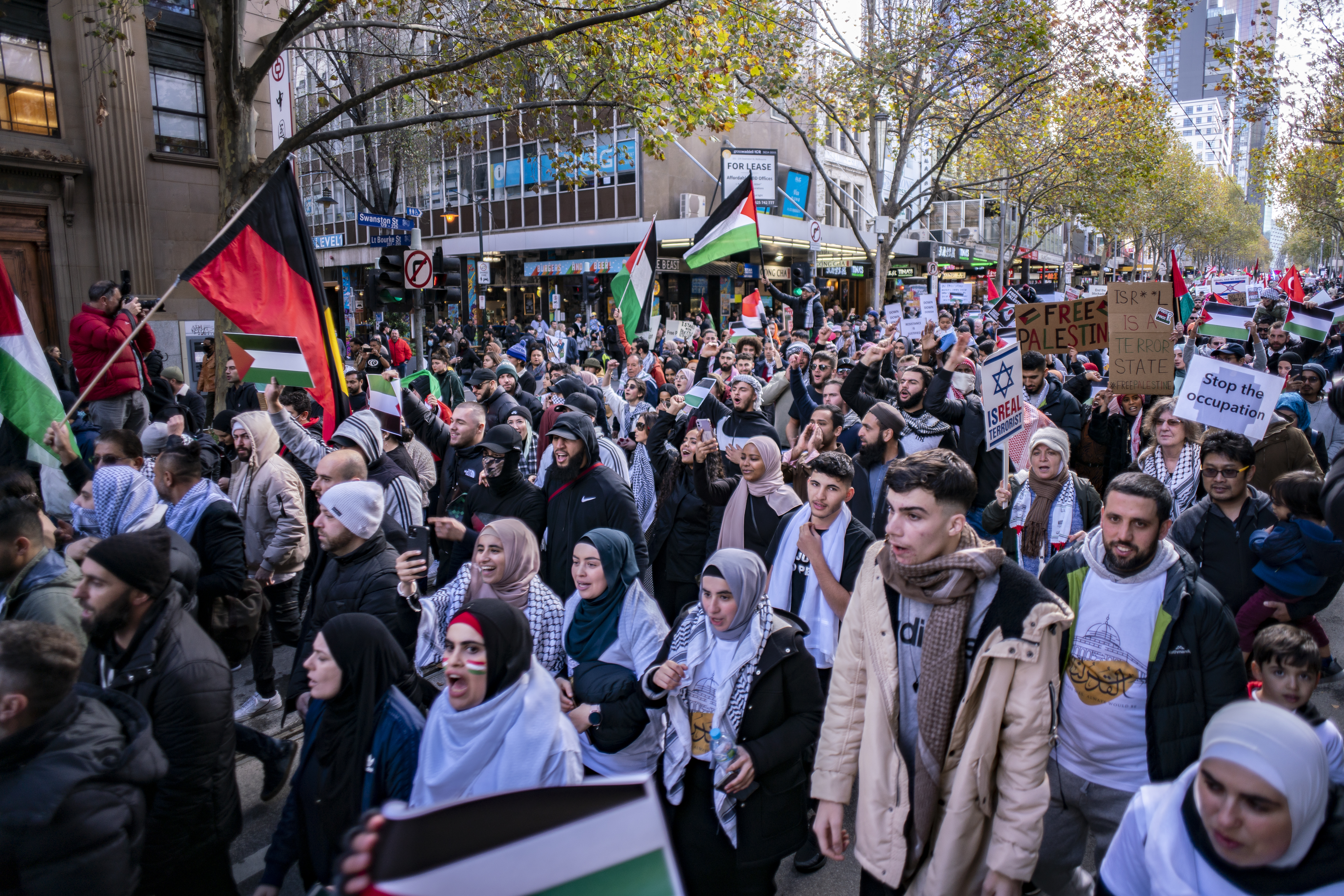
A pro-Palestinian demonstration in Melbourne, Australia, on 15 May 2021

- In New Zealand, during Nakba Day, protesters gathered in Auckland, Christchurch, Dunedin, Palmerston North, Hamilton, Whanganui, Nelson, and Wellington to show solidarity with Palestine.
- Thousands of people attended rallies across Ireland, in Cork, Galway and Dublin, including outside the Israeli Embassy, in support of Palestine.
- In India, the Jammu and Kashmir Police arrested 21 people in Kashmir for organizing protests in support of Palestine.
- Police in Paris, France, used tear gas and water cannons against pro-Palestinian protesters. This came a day after a French court banned protests in support of Palestine.
- Protesters gathered in London and Madrid in solidarity with Palestine.
- Over 7,000 people gathered in Brussels, Belgium, in support of Palestine.
- In the United States, protests were held in Atlanta, Boston, Dallas, Louisville, Los Angeles, New York City, Philadelphia, and other cities to demand an end to Israeli airstrikes in the Gaza Strip.
- In Canada, pro-Palestinian demonstrations were held in Montreal, Toronto, Winnipeg, and Ottawa.
- In Sweden, pro-Palestinian demonstrations were held in Stockholm, Gothenburg, Malmö, Karlstad, Växjö and Karlskoga. Police tried to break up several of the demonstrations.
- In Bishkek, Kyrgyzstan, a rally was held in support of Palestine. According to rally participant Ruslan Beknazarov, protesters called Israel a "occupier".
- In Romania, hundreds of pro-Palestinian demonstrators organised protests in Bucharest and Cluj-Napoca.

=== 16 May ===
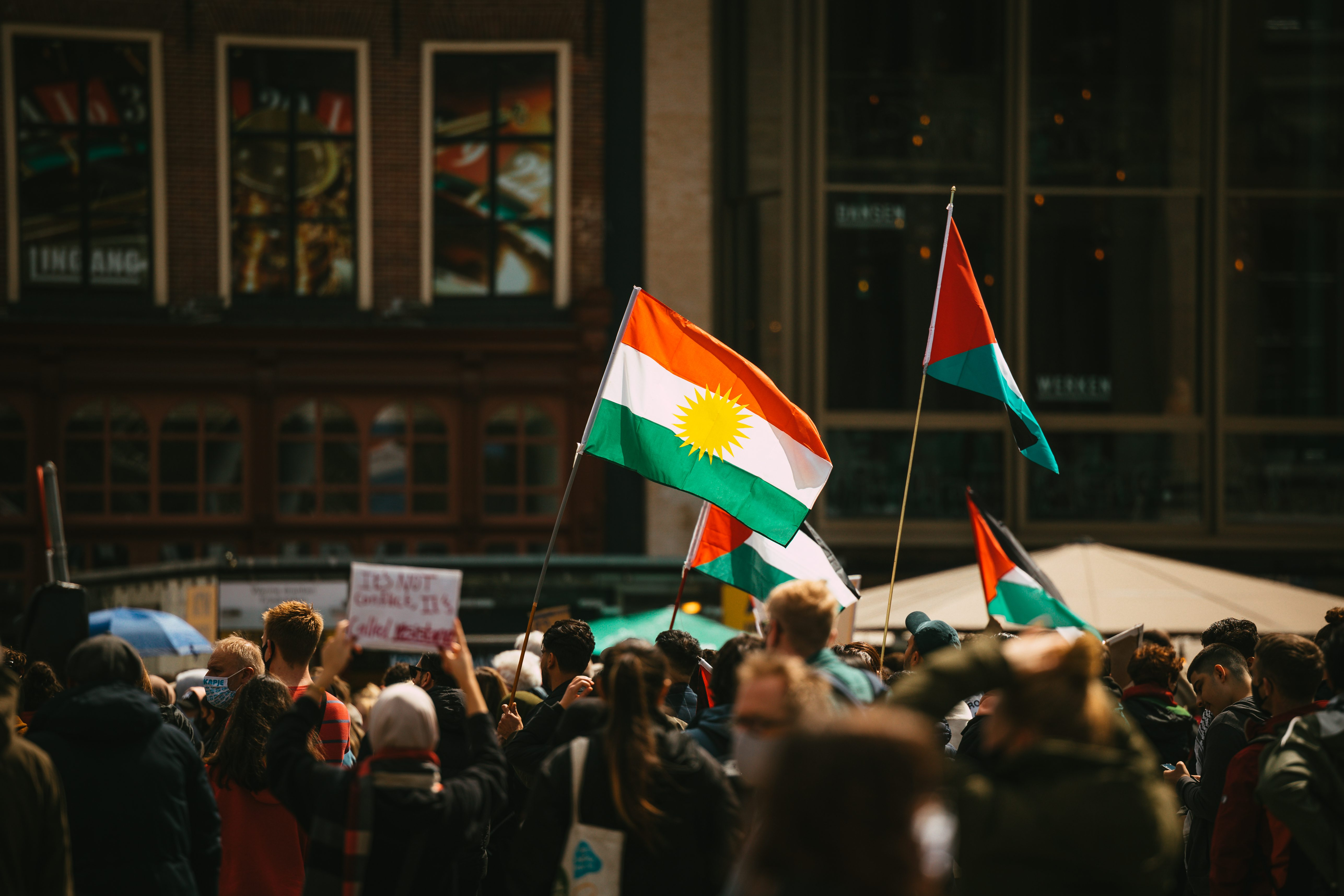
A pro-Palestinian demonstration in Groningen, Netherlands on 16 May 2021

- A convoy covered with Palestinian flags drove through north London shouting antisemitic language. Four people were later arrested on suspicion of racially aggravated public order offences. The British Prime Minister, Boris Johnson, and the Home Secretary, Priti Patel, issued statements condemning the incident.
- Several thousand people protested in Chicago's Loop in support of the Palestinians, calling for an end to the "ethnic cleansing" of the Palestinians.
- In Berlin, violent confrontations break out during a protest against Israel air strikes in the Gaza Strip, with an Israeli TV reporter being attacked.
- Montreal Police deployed tear gas to disperse a protest in downtown Montreal, which saw pro-Israel protesters clashing with pro-Palestinian protesters.

=== 17 May ===
- Protesters in Yemen gathered in Sanaa to protest Israel's attacks on the Gaza Strip. During the protest, demonstrators were seen calling for boycott of Israeli and American goods, as well as chanting "Death to America" and "Death to Israel".

=== 18 May ===
- Arab Americans in Dearborn, Michigan protested a visit by U.S. President Joe Biden to the Ford River Rouge Complex over the United States support of Israel's occupation in the Gaza Strip.
- Indonesians gathered at the U.S. Embassy in Jakarta to stand in solidarity with Palestine and demand an end to Israeli airstrikes in Gaza.
- Protesters gathered at Israeli embassies and consulates in Los Angeles and Washington, DC to demand an end to Israeli airstrikes in Gaza.
- Palestinians in the West Bank, East Jerusalem and communities inside Israel held a general strike to protest Israel's bombardment of the Gaza Strip and the evictions of Palestinians in Sheikh Jarrah. The Central Committee of Fatah called it a "day of rage".

=== 19 May ===
- In Kuwait, protesters burned Israeli flags and rally in support of Palestine. Protesters also rejected normalization agreements signed by Bahrain and the United Arab Emirates.

=== 20 May ===
- In the city of Chaman, Pakistan, a protest in support to Palestine was organized by Jamiat Ulama-e-Islam Nazryati. During the rally, a bomb exploded, killing seven people and wounding 14 more. Three JUI's leaders were among the dead.
- In South Korea, activists demonstrated outside the Israeli Embassy in Seoul, demanding an end to Israeli airstrikes in the Gaza Strip. The Korean Confederation of Trade Unions and 160 other civic organizations also took part in the demonstrations. The activists also called for the abolishment of the free trade agreement, which was recently signed between Israel and South Korea.
- In Midtown Manhattan, pro-Palestinian and pro-Israeli protesters clashed at Times Square, despite a ceasefire being announced between Israel and Hamas militants.
- A demonstration in solidarity with Palestine gathered hundreds of people in Gothenburg, Sweden. Police tried to break up the demonstration.

=== 21 May ===
- In the Indonesian capital of Jakarta, the Islamic Student Association and other Islamic groups organised a 700-strong protest outside the U.S. Embassy to protest US support for Israel. Protesters also demanded an end to Israeli airstrikes in the Gaza Strip despite the ceasefire going into force the day before. Protests are also held in Solo and Bandung. Protests supporting West Papuan independence in three cities also expressed support to stop war and violence in Palestine.
- In Toronto, activists painted the Israeli consulate with a "river of blood" to symbolize the 200 Palestinians who were killed during the conflict.

=== 22 May ===
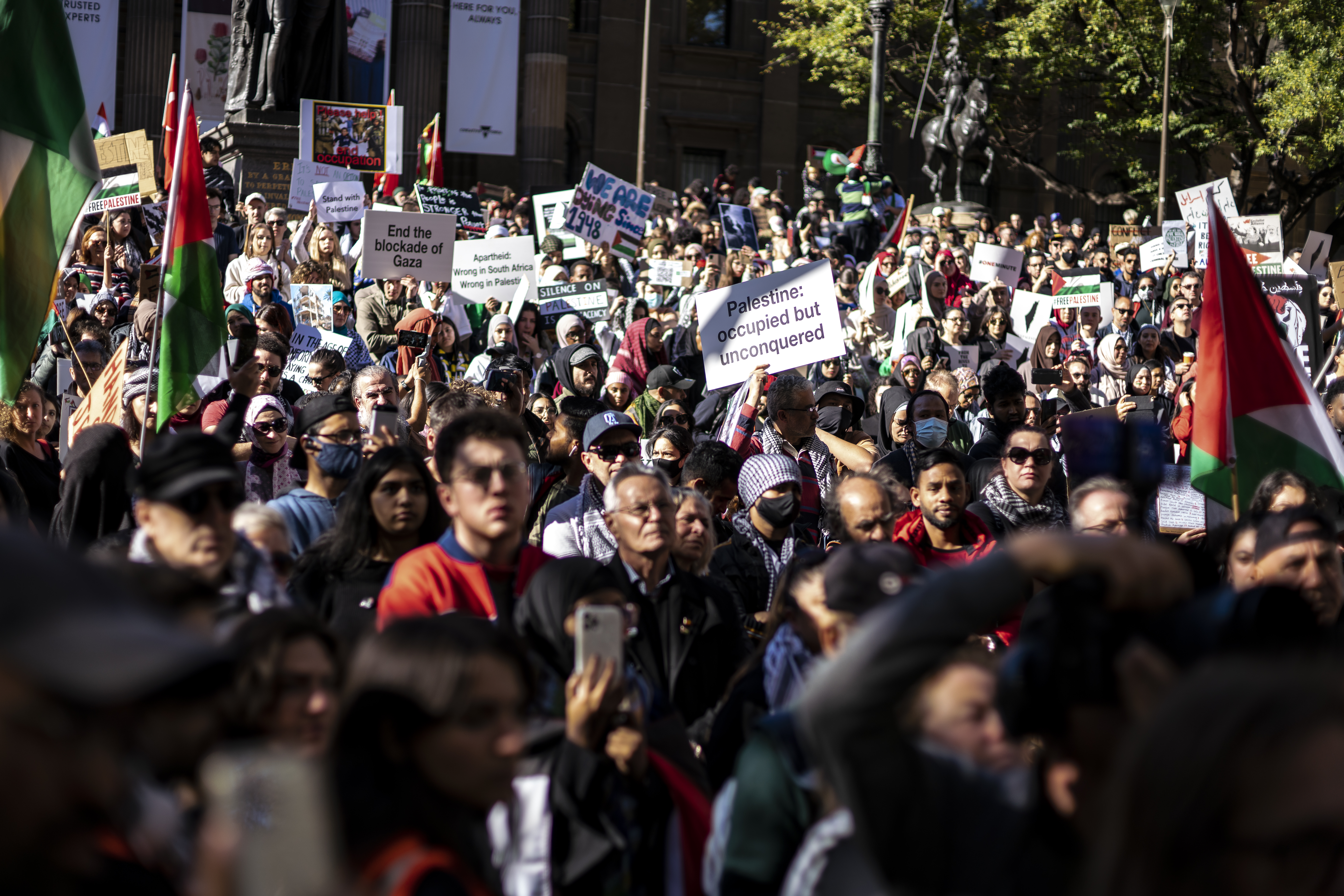
A second pro-Palestinian demonstration in Melbourne, Australia, on 22 May 2021

- An estimated 180,000 people protest in solidarity with Palestine in Hyde Park, making it possibly the largest Palestinian protest in British history.
- In New Zealand, 2,000 protestors in Auckland marched on the US Consulate-General to protest what they regarded as the United States' uncritical support for Israel. In addition, other Palestinian solidarity rallies were held across New Zealand. This marks the second weekend of nationwide Palestine solidarity protests in response to the crisis.
- Protests form outside the residence of Israeli Prime Minister Benjamin Netanyahu in Jerusalem, accusing him of intentionally escalating the conflict.
- In the United States, rallies are held in Chicago, Houston, Lexington, New York City, Philadelphia, and Portland in support of Palestine two days after the ceasefire.

=== 23 May ===
- In New Zealand, several pro-Israel advocacy groups including the Israel Institute of New Zealand, the Zionist Federation of New Zealand, and the Flaxmere Christian Fellowship staged pro-Israel rallies in Auckland, Wellington, and Hastings.
- In London, 1,500 participated in a demonstration to express solidarity with Israel. This demonstration was picketed by 40 Palestinian solidarity protesters. Controversial far-right figure Tommy Robinson attended the rally but his presence was condemned by both the Board of Deputies of British Jews and the Jewish Leadership Council.
- Hundreds participated in additional protests in solidarity with Palestine in multiple countries worldwide, including major cities across the United States, Spain, Italy, Iran, Libya, Somalia, Bosnia and Herzegovina, South Africa, Australia, France, and Germany. In the United States, notable demonstrations were held in New York City, Detroit, Dallas, Denver, San Francisco, and San Diego.

=== 25 May ===
- African National Congress members gather at the Israeli Embassy in Pretoria to stand in solidarity with Palestine. Members call for the people of Palestine to be given their land back. Additionally, anti-apartheid activist Jessie Duarte called South Africa to cut diplomatic relations with Israel.

=== 28 May ===
- In New Jersey, over 200 people gather at the Atlantic City Boardwalk to show solidarity with Palestine.

=== 29 May ===
- In the United Kingdom, protesters gather in Birmingham and Manchester to show solidarity with Palestine. In Manchester, protesters gather at the BBC building in MediaCityUK, while protesters burn Israeli flags in Birmingham.
- In Washington, DC, over 1,000 protesters gather at the Lincoln Memorial to call for an end to US aid to Israel.

== June 2021 ==
=== 4 June ===
- In San Francisco, protesters gather at the Port of Oakland to attempt to block an Israeli cargo ship from entering. Protesters also call for an economic boycott of Israel following the conflict.

=== 12 June ===
- Protesters in London gather at Downing Street to call for G7 leaders to end their support for Israel ahead of the G7 summit.
