= Harnai coal mine explosion =

2023 a coal mine explosion

- Date: 3 March 2023
- Location: Harnai district, Balochistan, Pakistan
- Cause: Methane gas explosion
- Deaths: 6

On 3 March 2023, a coal mine explosion in the Harnai district of Balochistan, Pakistan resulted in the death of six miners who were digging at a depth of 1,500 feet.

On 19 March 2023, about 18 miners were trapped after an explosion inside a coal mine in the Harnai district. Twelve of the miners were killed while eight were rescued.

== Background ==
In March 2021, seven miners were killed in a blast at a coal mine in Harnai, Balochistan.

== Incident ==
Methane gas accumulation inside the mine caused the explosion and trapped the workers as a portion of the mine collapsed.

During the search and rescue operation, five rescue workers fell unconscious due to methane gas, but another team managed to save them. Unfortunately, the six miners had already died by the time rescue teams arrived. The incident highlights the danger of lax safety protocols in Balochistan's mines.

The Chief Minister of Balochistan, Mir Abdul Qudoos Bizenjo, ordered an inquiry into the incident and emphasized the need to take all possible measures to prevent such mishaps in coal mines.
