= International Urdu Conference =

International Urdu Conference Aalmi Urdu Conference عالمی اردو کانفرنس
- Status: active
- Genre: Conference
- Frequency: Annually
- Venue: Karachi
- Years active: 2008
- Inaugurated: 2008
- Previous event: 2021
- Next event: 2023
- Patron: Government of Pakistan
- Organiser: Arts Council of Pakistan
- Website: urduconference.com

The International Urdu Conference or Aalmi Urdu Conference (Urdu:عالمی اردو کانفرنس), is an international conference on Urdu language. The international conference consists of several Urdu scholars, writers and laureates from different parts of the world who contribute to the Urdu language. It is run and organized every year by the Arts Council of Pakistan.

From 2008 to present day, Arts Council of Pakistan were hosted 15th editions of International Urdu Conference. The last and 15th International Urdu Conference were held in Karachi from 1 December 2022 to 4 December 2022.

== History ==
International Urdu Conference started by the Arts Council of Pakistan, headquartered in Karachi in 2008, has become a yearly tradition eagerly anticipated by Pakistani writers and cultural figures. Renowned academics from India, United Kingdom, Canada, Turkey, Iran, and other countries took part and presented their research papers, theses, and creative works on Urdu language.

== Editions of conference ==
S.No	Edition	Start date	End date	Duration	Location	Ref
1	1st	25 June 2008	26 June 2008	1 day	Karachi	
2	2nd	17 November 2009	21 November 2009	4 days	Karachi	
3	3rd	2 December 2010	5 December 2010	3 days	Karachi	
4	4th	22 November 2011	25 November 2011	3 days	Karachi	
5	5th	6 December 2012	9 December 2012	3 days	Karachi	
6	6th	28 November 2013	1 December 2013	3 days	Karachi	
7	7th	16 October 2014	19 October 2014	3 days	Karachi	
8	8th	8 December 2015	11 December 2015	3 days	Karachi	
9	9th	1 December 2016	4 December 2016	3 days	Karachi	
10	10th	21 December 2017	25 December 2017	4 days	Karachi	
11	11th	22 November 2018	25 November 2018	3 days	Karachi	
12	12th	5 December 2019	8 December 2019	3 days	Karachi	
13	13th	3 December 2020	6 December 2020	3 days	Karachi	
14	14th	9 December 2021	12 December 2021	3 days	Karachi	
15	15th	1 December 2022	4 December 2022	3 days	Karachi	

== See also ==
- Urdu movement
- Arts Council of Pakistan
- Pakistan National Council of the Arts
- Ministry of Culture
- Foundation for Arts, Culture and Education
- National Academy of Performing Arts (Pakistan)
- Culture of Pakistan
