= Tanda Dam =

Dam in Khyber Pakhtunkhwa, Pakistan

Coordinates: 33°34′N 71°24′E

Designations

Ramsar Wetland
- Designated: 23 July 1976
- Reference no.: 98

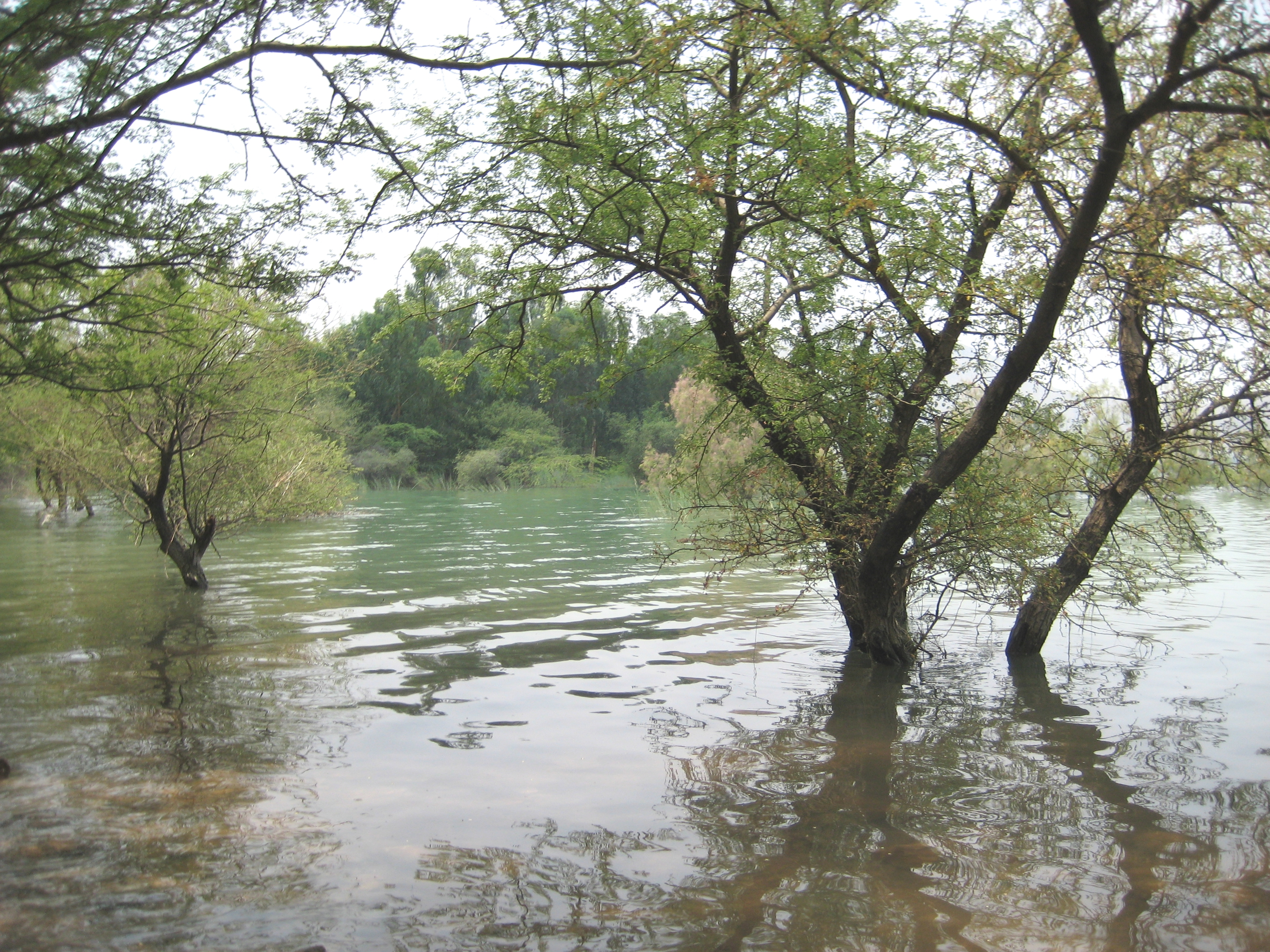
Tanda Lake

Tanda Dam or Tanda Lake is a small dam and also a lake view park located in Kohat District of Pakistan's Khyber Pakhtunkhwa province of Pakistan. The dam supplies water for irrigation to Jerma, Tappi, Baqizai, Dhoda, Shahpur and many other villages via canals from Tanda Lake.

It became operational on 17 July 1967, though it was inaugurated by the then president Ayub Khan in 1962. Covering an area of 405 ha (1,000 acres), Tanda Dam had the initial capacity to store 65,000 acre feet of water and provide a perennial supply of 260 cusecs of water for irrigation.

Tanda Lake is a protected site under the Ramsar Convention, an international treaty for the conservation and sustainable utilization of wetlands. It was included as a Ramsar site on 23 July 1976. The lake is home to migratory birds from Siberia and the Caspian during winter.

== Incident ==
On 29 January 2023, 49 children and two adults drowned when their boat capsized in the lake. The boat they were travelling on was carrying people on a daytrip from a local madrassa when it overturned.
