= 2021 Machh attack =

Terrorist attack in Pakistan

Machh attack
- Part of the insurgency in Balochistan, Sectarian violence in Pakistan, and the persecution of Hazara people
- Location: Machh, Balochistan, Pakistan
- Date: 3 January 2021
- Deaths: 11
- Perpetrator: Islamic State – Pakistan Province
- Motive: Anti-Shi'ism, Islamic extremism

On 3 January 2021, a group of Islamic State (IS) militants killed 11 Hazara coal miners after kidnapping them in Machh, Balochistan, Pakistan.

== The attack ==
The miners were on their way to work when the gunmen ambushed and dragged them into the nearby mountains.

All 11 miners were blindfolded and had their hands tied behind their backs before their throats were slit. A video shows bodies of the slain miners on the floor of a village hut. The victims were members of the minority Shia community.

== Victims ==
Victims
| No. | Name | Age | Ref. |
|---|---|---|---|
| 1 | Abdullah Qadam | 37 | |
| 2 | Ahmad Shah | 18 | |
| 3 | Aziz Raza Beigi | 32 | |
| 4 | Asif Ghulam Ali | 18 | |
| 5 | Chaman Ali Beigi | 35 | |
| 6 | Hassan Jan | 27 | |
| 7 | Karim Bakhsh | 37 | |
| 8 | Mohammad Anwar Ali | 22 | |
| 9 | Mohammad Sadiq | 35 | |
| 10 | Nasim Beigi | 22 | |
| 11 | Sher Mohammad | 18 | |

== Protests ==
Not long after the attack, Hazaras blocked roads and burned tires in Quetta, the capital of Balochistan province. They gathered to protest the terror attacks against their community and to demonstrate for their rights. They demanded that the Prime Minister visit them and personally assure them that justice would be served in the case of the lynched miners.

A demonstration organized by the Majlis Wahdat-e-Muslimeen in Karachi continued for three days at over twenty locations in the city. Balochistan's Shia Hazara community continued a sit-in protest with the dead bodies for six straight days on Quetta's Western Bypass, refusing to bury the murdered miners.

However, then prime minister Imran khan refused to visit them and stated that he would not be 'blackmailed' into visiting the bereaved community. The former prime minister's comments drew widespread criticism by activists, opposition parties and others on social media and were slammed as inhuman, insensitive and insulting to the massacred miners.

== Government action and burial ==
The government ordered the law enforcement agency to investigate the incident and bring the perpetrators to justice, with then Prime Minister Imran Khan denouncing the murders as "an inhumane act of terrorism".

The Interior Minister Sheikh Rasheed Ahmad also visited the families of the victims and assured them that the culprits involved in the attack will be brought to justice at all costs. He expressed condolences to the families of victims and announced compensation for them. The attack was also condemned by Afghanistan. The Ministry of Foreign Affairs of Afghanistan stated that seven Afghan Hazaras were among the 11 miners who were killed.

On January 9, 2021, the miners were buried at Hazara Town cemetery in Quetta. The same day, Imran Khan reached Quetta where he met the families of the murdered miners.

== Claim of responsibility ==
In due course, the Islamic State (IS) claimed responsibility for the attack through the Telegram communication channel of the Amaq news agency.

== See also ==
- List of terrorist incidents linked to Islamic State – Khorasan Province
- List of terrorist incidents in 2021
- List of terrorist incidents linked to ISIL
- 2015 Zabul massacre
