= 2023 Gwadar ambush =

Mass murder in Balochistan, Pakistan

- Part of Insurgency in Balochistan
- Location: Gwadar District, Balochistan, Pakistan
- Date: 3 November 2023
- Attack type: Ambush
- Deaths: 14 servicemen

On 3 November 2023, a Pakistan Army convoy was attacked in Gwadar District, Balochistan, Pakistan, resulting in the death of 14 soldiers when two vehicles of the security forces were ambushed by militants while moving from Pasni to Ormara.

== Ambush ==
On 3 November 2023, militants ambushed two vehicles of security forces going to Ormara from Pansi area of Gwadar District. As a result of the attack, 14 soldiers were killed. The Pakistani army's media wing Inter-Services Public Relations (ISPR) confirmed the incident. The attack occurred hours after a bomb targeting security forces was detonated in Dera Ismail Khan in Khyber Pakhtunkhwa, killing five people and injuring 20.

== Aftermath ==
A clearing operation was conducted in the area. The ISPR said that the perpetrators of this criminal act will be caught and brought to justice. The Army reiterated its commitment to eliminate the menace of terrorism from the country, saying that such sacrifices of brave soldiers only strengthen their resolve.

Funeral prayers for the victims were performed in Pasni. Senior serving military and civil administration officers and soldiers participated in the ceremony. The dead were buried in their native areas with full military honours.

== Reactions ==
President Arif Alvi strongly condemned the attack on the army convoy. He expressed deep grief and regret over the loss of life in the attack and paid tribute to the security forces personnel. He said that terrorists are enemies of Pakistan and will continue efforts for their complete elimination. Interim Prime Minister Anwaar ul Haq Kakar also condemned the attack and paid tribute to the victims, adding that the “evil intentions” of militants would not be allowed to succeed.

Caretaker Foreign Minister Jalil Abbas Jilani also strongly condemned the attack. He said that such acts were highly condemnable and sympathized with the bereaved families of the dead and injured. He reiterated that Pakistan was determined against terrorists.
