= August 2021 Quetta bombing =

Terrorist incident in Pakistan

- Location: Quetta, Balochistan, Pakistan
- Date: 9 August 2021
- Target: Police van
- Deaths: 2
- Injuries: 22
- Perpetrator: Balochistan Liberation Army

On August 9, 2021, two bomb blasts in Quetta killed two policemen and injured 21 others, including eight policemen.

== The bombing ==
One of the blasts took place near the Serena Hotel at Unity Chowk. The second blast was caused by a grenade attack on Sariab Road.

The first blast near the Serena Hotel was due to an explosive device planted on a motorcycle and a police van was targeted in a key security area. The blast killed at least two policemen.

Of the 21 people wounded in the attack, 9 were innocent civilians who were walking in the area. The attack caused the police van to burst into flames, which were contained by firefighters.

The injured were shifted to Civil Hospital Quetta.

The second blast occurred in the second hour of the first near the wheelbarrow at the Sada Bihar bus terminal on Sariab Road, where Krishna Kumar were being sold the Pakistani flags to celebrate the upcoming Independence Day. A grenade attack in the area injured one person.

Deputy Inspector General of Quetta police said that they were made aware of the threat and put the police on high alert.

The responsibility for the attack was claimed by the Balochistan Liberation Army, a militant organization that seeks separation from the state.

== See also ==
- Quetta Serena Hotel bombing
- September 2021 Quetta bombing
- Quetta attacks
