= 2021 Gwadar bombing =

Terrorist attack in Pakistan

Gwadar suicide attack
- Date: 20 August 2021
- Time: (UTC+05:00)
- Location: Gwadar, Balochistan, Pakistan
- Target: Chinese crew
- Perpetrator: Balochistan Liberation Army
- Deaths: 2
- Injuries: 4

On 20 August 2021, a suicide attack on a convoy of Chinese workers on the Gwadar Expressway project, as a result two local children were killed and three were injured in southwestern Pakistan.

== The bombing ==
The Pakistan interior ministry said that the attack took place on an expressway under construction in the Nagori ward area, when three vehicles were taking Chinese citizens under military and police surveillance. As the convoy approached the fishermen's colony on the East Bay Expressway, a young boy came out and ran to hit the vehicles. The attacker blew themselves up 15 to 20 meters away from the convoy when plainclothes army personnel rushed and stop the attacker. The injured Chinese national was shifted to Gwadar Hospital where his condition was out of danger.

== Claim of responsibility ==
The attack was claimed by the Balochistan Liberation Army (BLA), a separatist militant organization. "BLA carried out a 'self-sacrificing' attack against a convoy of Chinese engineers," they said in a message.

== See also ==
- Insurgency in Balochistan
- List of terrorist incidents in Pakistan since 2001
