= April 2021 Quetta Serena Hotel bombing =

2021 terrorist attack in Pakistan

Quetta Serena Hotel bombing
- Location: Quetta, Balochistan, Pakistan
- Date: 21 April 2021
- Target: Serena Hotel
- Attack type: Suicide car bombing
- Weapon: Car bomb
- Deaths: 5
- Injuries: 11
- Perpetrator: Tehrik-i-Taliban Pakistan

On 21 April 2021, a car bombing killed at least five people and injured another twelve at the Serena Hotel, Quetta, Balochistan, Pakistan, near the Afghan border.

== Bombing ==
Ziaullah Lango, Balochistan provincial Home Minister said, that the blast took place in the parking lot of the hotel. Pakistan's Interior Minister Sheikh Rashid Ahmad announced that the primary target was believed to be China's ambassador to Pakistan, Nong Rong. Although the ambassador was staying at the luxury hotel, he was not there at the time of the bombing. Another possible reason given for the attack was that the bombing in the city of Quetta took place hours after Pakistan opened a new border crossing with neighboring Iran, a move that many have criticized. The Interior Minister confirmed that none of the hotel guests were injured, but a police officer and two security guards had been identified among the five victims.

== Responsibility ==
The Tehrik-i-Taliban Pakistan (TTP) claimed responsibility, saying it was a suicide attack.

== See also ==
- August 2021 Quetta bombing
- September 2021 Quetta bombing
- Quetta attack (disambiguation)
