= Dera Ismail Khan bombing =

Dera Ismail Khan bombing may refer to these attacks in Dera Ismail Khan, Khyber Pakhtunkhwa, Pakistan during the insurgency in Khyber Pakhtunkhwa:

- January 2007 Dera Ismail Khan suicide bombing
- August 2008 Dera Ismail Khan suicide bombing
- November 2008 Dera Ismail Khan bombing
- January 2009 Dera Ismail Khan bombings
- February 2009 Dera Ismail Khan suicide bombing
- May 2009 Dera Ismail Khan bombings
- 2010 Dera Ismail Khan bombing
- 2012 Dera Ismail Khan bombing
- 2017 Dera Ismail Khan bombing
- 2018 Kulachi suicide bombing
- 2023 Dera Ismail Khan bombing
- 2023 Daraban police station attack
- 2026 Daraban police checkpoint attack

== See also ==
- Dera Ismail Khan (disambiguation)
- 2013 Dera Ismail Khan prison attack
