= Dera Ismail Khan (disambiguation) =

Dera Ismail Khan is a city in Khyber Pakhtunkhwa, Pakistan

Dera Ismail Khan may also refer to:

- Dera Ismail Khan District, a district of Khyber Pakhtunkhwa, Pakistan
- Dera Ismail Khan Tehsil, a tehsil of Dera Ismail Khan District
- Dera Ismail Khan Division, an administrative unit of Khyber Pakhtunkhwa, Pakistan
- Dera Ismail Khan Cantonment, a cantonment in Pakistan
- Dera Ismail Khan Airport
- Dera Ismail Khan cricket team, a local and domestic cricket team

== See also ==
- Dera Ismail Khan bombing (disambiguation)
- Dera Ismail Khan mine, a large gypsum mine
- Dera Ghazi Khan (disambiguation)
