= February 2009 Dera Ismail Khan suicide bombing =

Terrorist incident in Pakistan

2009 Dera Ismail Khan suicide bombing
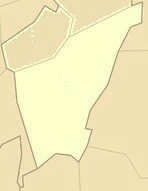
- Imam Bargah Kotli Imam (Dera Ismail Khan) Imam Bargah Kotli Imam (Pakistan)
- Location: 31°50′38.97″N 70°54′48.38″E; Imam Bargah Kotli Imam, Dera Ismail Khan, Khyber Pakhtunkhwa, Pakistan
- Date: February 20, 2009
- Target: People attending funeral
- Attack type: Suicide attack, Shooting
- Weapon: Explosive belt
- Deaths: 32
- Injuries: 65
- Victim: Shi'ites
- No. of participants: 1
- Defender: Khyber Pakhtunkhwa Police
- Motive: Anti-Shi'ism

The 2009 Dera Ismail Khan suicide bombing was a suicide bombing of a funeral procession in Bargah Kotli Imam, Dera Ismail Khan, on February 20, 2009. The attack killed 32 and injured 65 people.

== Background ==
The attack was preceded by other attacks which targeted Pakistani Shi'ites, including bombings in August and November of the previous year. Shi'ite funerals were targeted in both 2008 incidents as well as the 2009 suicide bombing.

== Attack ==
A day before the attack, Sher Zaman, a Shi'ite, was shot dead by a gunman. During his funeral at Kotli Imam Bargah the following day, a suicide bomber blew himself up, immediately killing 20 people and injuring others. In their investigation, police announced that they found the legs of the suspected bomber.

== Aftermath and reactions ==
Some members of the Shi'ite community reacted to the attack by protesting and destroying shops and vehicles. A curfew was imposed and the army was called in to the city, with the area's top administrator defending the decision out of a "fear [that violence] could spread to other parts." Shoot-on-sight orders were issued to police.

President Asif Ali Zardari condemned the attack. Prime Minister Yousuf Raza Gilani also condemned the attack, called for an official inquiry, and asked local security forces to ensure that the injured received proper treatment.

Khyber Pakhtunkhwa Chief Minister Ameer Haider Khan Hoti condemned the attack saying, "We condemn attack on Dera Ismail Khan; residents of Dera Ismail Khan are appealed to stay with peace." As compensation, Hoti announced Rs. 100,000 for the families of those killed and Rs. 50,000 for those who were injured.

Punjab Chief Minister Shehbaz Sharif and JUIF party president Fazl-ur-Rehman also condemned the attack.
