= Dera Ghazi Khan (disambiguation) =

Dera Ghazi Khan is a city in Punjab, Pakistan.

Dera Ghazi Khan may also refer to:

- Dera Ghazi Khan District, a district of Punjab (Pakistan)
- Dera Ghazi Khan Tehsil, a tehsil of district Dera Ghazi Khan
- Dera Ghazi Khan Division, an administrative unit of Punjab (Pakistan)
- Dera Ghazi Khan International Airport, an airport situated in Punjab (Pakistan)
- Dera Ghazi Khan railway station, a railway station in Punjab
- Dera Ghazi Khan Medical College, a medical college

== See also ==
- Dera Ghazi Khan bombings (disambiguation)
- Dera Ismail Khan (disambiguation)
