= Dinpur =

Village in Dera Ismail Khan, Pakistan

- Village and Union Council
- Dinpur, Dera Ismail Khan
- Location in Pakistan
- Coordinates: 31.8265°N 70.8794°E
- Country: Pakistan
- Province: Khyber Pakhtunkhwa
- District: Dera Ismail Khan District
- Founder: Ahsan Ali Dinpur
- Elevation: 175 m (574 ft)
- Time zone: UTC+5 (PST)
- Postal code: 29100

Dinpur is a village and union council in the Dera Ismail Khan District of Khyber Pakhtunkhwa, Pakistan. It lies southeast of the district’s capital, Dera Ismail Khan, and is situated at an elevation of approximately 175 metres above sea level.

== Administration ==
Dinpur forms part of the Dera Ismail Khan Tehsil and serves as a local government unit (union council) under provincial administration.

== Population and economy ==
Predominantly an agricultural community, Dinpur benefits from fertile plains and irrigation infrastructure. Main crops include wheat, maize, sugar‑cane, and cotton.

== Education ==
The village hosts a government-run secondary school, Government High School Dinpur, as well as Dinpur Primary School, both serving the local population.

== Development ==
Recent years have seen an increase in community development, with growing access to education, internet, and awareness campaigns aimed at empowering youth.

== Healthcare ==
In May 2025, the provincial government allocated PKR 1.11 billion to establish cardiac catheterization laboratories and a burns centre at Mufti Mehmood Memorial Hospital and District Headquarters Hospital in nearby Dera Ismail Khan. These are intended to serve Dinpur residents locally, reducing the need for travel to larger cities.

== Security and law enforcement ==
Following security incidents in the district—including rocket attacks on military and cantonment areas in December 2022—police operations were conducted in Dinpur and adjacent locales. Several individuals were arrested as part of these organized-crime containment efforts.

== Electricity and protests ==
During the winter of 2022–23, long hours of power outages in Dinpur triggered public protests. Demonstrators blocked roads—including Dinpur Road—and burned tyres to demand consistent electricity supply from PESCO and provincial authorities.

== Administrative oversight ==
In April 2023, the Assistant Commissioner visited local health facilities unannounced in Dinpur, identifying staff absenteeism at dispensaries and mandating steps to improve accountability.

== Notable people ==
- Ghulam Muhammad Din Puri (1835–1936), an Islamic scholar and founder of Dinpur Sharif.

== See also ==
Basti Tarkhananwali

== Postal code ==
The official postal code for Dinpur is 29100.
