= 2011 Kulachi police station attack =

Terrorist incident in Pakistan

2011 Kulachi Police station attack
- Part of War in North-West Pakistan
Date	25 June 2011
Location	Police station Kulachi, Dera Ismail Khan, KPK, Pakistan 31.924511°N 70.466482°E
Result	Police victory (killed all terrorists)

Belligerents
(Khyber Pakhtunkhwa) KPK Police	Tehreek-i-Taliban Pakistan

Strength
30	12

Casualties and losses
10 killed 3 injured Police records were destroyed	5 killed
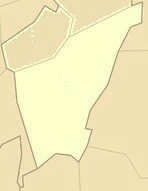
- Location within Dera Ismail Khan Kulcahi (Pakistan)

On 25 June 2011, 12 militants of Tehreek-i-Taliban Pakistan (TTP) attacked a police station in Kulachi, Dera Ismail Khan. In response police defended building and a conflict started between police and terrorists which lasted for five hours. 10 policemen were killed while three were injured. Five terrorists were killed and others managed to escape. The spokesman of TTP Ehsanullah Ehsan claimed responsibility and said that the attack was carried in retaliation against Osama's killing and government's attacks against terrorists.

== Background ==
Kulachi lies within Dera Ismail Khan, which is close to South Waziristan and other FATA regions that have hosted many military operations launched by the Pakistan Army to eliminate terrorism. Security forces are targeted in Pakistan by insurgents. This attack was also carried out against the police.

== Attack ==
Three terrorists, two men and one woman, wearing burqas and suicide jackets, entered the police station. They threw hand grenades as they entered the police station. At around 7:26 pm, one of the terrorists threw a hand grenade at the building while the others started firing indiscriminately on the policemen inside. 30–35 police men were inside the building by that time. Some terrorists had taken position on the roof of the police station and were firing at the security guards who surrounded the building. At 7:30 pm two loud explosions were heard and it was not confirm whether they were suicide blasts but initial reports stated that militants were wearing suicide jackets. At 7:35 pm, five minutes after the two explosions, another explosion was heard. At 7:45 pm an armoured vehicle caught fire as result of explosion. An additional 150 security officials were called to take control of the area. At 7:55 pm when additional security forces tried to enter the building, a terrorist threw a hand grenade on their armoured vehicle and others started firing on them. The security forces could not enter the building as terrorists took 25 policemen hostage inside the building. At 8:00 pm two hostages were rescued from the crossfire. During the crossfire, the records of the police station were destroyed. At 8:20 pm the building caught fire due to explosions and the crossfire between the militants and security officials. During the fight, two of the three suicide bombers blew themselves up, while the third was killed by police. The suicide bombers were a couple, and police found two pairs of legs and a woman's head.

== Reactions ==
President of Pakistan Asif Ali Zardari condemned the attack and prayed for the policemen who were killed. He also appreciated the security forces' effort. Prime minister Yousuf Raza Gilani condemned the attack and paid tribute to law enforcement agencies for fighting the terrorists.
