= 2011 Dera Ghazi Khan bombings =

Pakistani Taliban Suicide Bombings

3 April 2011 Dera Ghazi Khan bombing
- Location: 29°59′11″N 70°18′09″E; Dera Ghazi Khan District, Punjab, Pakistan
- Date: 3 April 2011; 5pm (PKT)
- Attack type: Suicide bombing
- Deaths: 50+
- Injuries: 120+
- No. of participants: 2 bombers, another one arrested

Two suicides bombings occurred on 3 April 2011 in a Sufi shrine dedicated to a 13th-century Sufi saint, Ahmed Sultan, located near the city of Dera Ghazi Khan in the southern region of Pakistan's Punjab province.

== Background ==
Sufism is a Muslim culture that has thrived in the Indian subcontinent and involves the belief that one can feel a linked connection with God through spirituality. In Pakistan, the Punjab region has been a historical hub of Sufi culture. Sufism and Sufi traditions are regarded as heretical by hard-line Islamists. In Sufi shrines devotees pray to saints while singing and dancing and this is considered un-Islamic by the Taliban. Several Sufi shrines in Pakistan have been targeted in the past by the Taliban.

== Attack ==
The attack was a double suicide bombing that left more than 50 people dead, as well as 120 wounded. The bombings occurred while thousands of devotees were gathered for the annual Urs celebrations at the shrine. Urs are an integral part of South Asian Muslim culture and are held to mark the death anniversary of a Sufi. At around 5 pm PST, a teenaged bomber detonated his explosives while devotees were performing a mystical devotional dance at the main entrance to the building. Many of those wounded were in a critical condition. Approximately fifteen minutes later, a second suicide bomber also struck at the staircase of the shrine. A witness reported: "Bodies were scattered all over and the injured people were crying for help."

According to police officials, both the bombers tried to enter the shrine but being unsuccessful, blew themselves up on the entrance. A third suicide bomber was also recognized and arrested; While people were running in panic, the bomber by chance ran into an elderly woman and a hand grenade dropped from his hand. The woman signaled alarm and nearby security officials opened fire on him which left him wounded. The attempted suicide bomber was identified as Umar or "Fida Hussain", a teenager Afghan refugee hailing from the tribal areas in northwest Pakistan. He writhed on the ground while people took away his equipment.

== Aftermath ==
Following the explosion, a state of emergency was declared and victims were shifted to various hospitals in Dera Ghazi Khan and nearby Multan. The death toll mounted as several people succumbed to their injuries in the various hospitals.

It is said that the shrine had previously received threats from unknown militants. The Pakistani Taliban later claimed responsibility for the attacks.

The shrine reopened the following day.

=== Investigations ===
Two days after the attack, the police claimed that it had identified the masterminds behind the bombing and that arrests were about to be carried out. According to investigators, the planning for the bombing had been carried out in the Bajaur Agency in the tribal areas along the Afghan border. Two of the suicide bombers were from North Waziristan; they had received their vests from handlers based in Dera Ismail Khan and later travelled to Dera Ghazi Khan, booking themselves a room at a hotel. Umar, who failed to detonate his explosives, told interrogators that he had been told he would be granted paradise if he conducted the attack. He referred to himself as a "Fida'i" (meaning one who sacrifices their life for a cause), a term which militants often use for suicide bombers. When questioned how he would get into paradise by attacking people, he replied: "I don’t know about that but paradise must be better than this world."

=== Response ===
(Pakistan) A statement from the office of Prime Minister Yousaf Raza Gillani condemned the blast, stating "such cowardly acts of terror clearly demonstrate that the culprits involved neither have any faith nor any belief in human values. Such violent acts only seem to be conspiracy to divide the society and create fear."

== See also ==
- List of terrorist incidents in Pakistan since 2001
- December 2009 Dera Ghazi Khan bombing
- July 2010 Lahore bombings
