= Dera Ghazi Khan bombings =

Dera Ghazi Khan bombings may refer to:

- 2009 Dera Ghazi Khan bombing, a car bombing that occurred on 15 December 2009
- 2011 Dera Ghazi Khan bombings, a pair of suicide bombings that occurred 3 April 2011
