= 2023 Dera Ismail Khan bombing =

IED attack in Pakistan

- Part of Insurgency in Khyber Pakhtunkhwa
- Location: Dera Ismail Khan, Khyber Pakhtunkhwa, Pakistan
- Date: 3 November 2023
- Target: Khyber Pakhtunkhwa Police
- Attack type: Bombing
- Weapon: Improvised explosive device
- Deaths: 5
- Injuries: Over 20

On 3 November 2023, a bombing occurred in Dera Ismail Khan, Khyber Pakhtunkhwa, Pakistan, in which five people were killed and more than 20 injured.

== The bombing ==
The bombing targeted a police patrol car. The explosives were planted in a motorcycle and detonated near the police car. Heavy gunfire followed the explosion. The incident took place near a bus stop in the Tank Adda area of the city.

== Casualties ==
Five people were killed by the explosion. More than 20 others were injured, some them critically.

== Aftermath ==
After the blast, rescue teams and law enforcement agencies reached the spot for relief activities and securing the location. Emergency measures were implemented in the hospitals of Dera Ismail Khan.

== Investigation ==
Initially, the nature of the explosion was not known

== See also ==
- Dera ismail khan bombing
- Mian wali air base attack
