= Ghulam Muhammad Din Puri =

Islamic scholar

Maulana Hazrat Khalifa Mian Ghulam Muhammad Din Puri

Personal life
- Born: 1835 Mouza Alam Khan of eastern Jhang District
- Died: 24 March 1936 (aged 100–101)
- Resting place: Dinpur Cemetery

Religious life
- Religion: Islam
- Founder of: Dinpur Sharif
- Movement: Silk Letter Movement
- Profession: Islamic scholar

Muslim leader
- Teacher: Hafiz Muhammad Siddique

Ghulam Muhammad Din Puri (1835–24 March 1936) was an Islamic scholar who founded Dinpur Sharif. He was originally from Jhang and belonged to the Rind Baloch family. He played an active role in the Silk Letter Movement.

== Biography ==
Ghulam Muhammad was born in 1835 in the Mouza Alam Khan of eastern Jhang District. He died on 24 March 1936. Maulana Ghulam Muhammad Ghotvi, Vice Chancellor of Bahawalpur University, led the funeral prayers. He is buried in Dinpur Cemetery.

== See also ==
- List of Deobandis
- Dinpur
