= 2010 Dera Ismail Khan bombing =

Terrorist incident in Pakistan

- Part of War in North-West Pakistan
- Dera Ismail Khan (Pakistan)
- Location: Kachi Paind Khan, Dera Ismail Khan, Khyber Pakhtunkhwa, Pakistan
- Date: May 18, 2010
- Target: DSP Kulachi, Muhammad Iqbal Khan
- Attack type: Bombing
- Weapon: IED
- Deaths: 13
- Injuries: 14
- Victims: Iqbal Khan and his guards

On May 18, 2010, a bombing took place in Kachi Paind Khan area of Dera Ismail Khan. The bomb was planted on a motorcycle and killed 13 people while injured 14 on its detonation. Deputy superintendent of Kulachi police, Muhammad Iqbal Khan was also among the deceased and was said to be the target of attack.

== Background ==
Dera Ismail Khan had hosted many incidents of bombing prior to this one. Policemen and security officials are targeted by militants in Pakistan as retaliation to ongoing War in North-West Pakistan. The 2010 Dera Ismail Khan bombing was also carried out against police.

== Attack ==
On 18 May, when DSP of Kulachi, Iqbal Khan left his home at Kachi Paind Khan escorted by police mobile, a bomb planted in Motorcycle exploded near the police van. Security official reached the site and cordoned off the area. According to bomb disposal squad, four kilograms of material was used in the bomb. 13 people were killed while 14 got injured. The injured were brought to District Head Quarter hospital where five were said to be in critical condition. The human flesh of the victims was laid scattered on roads and bang of explosion was heard in three kilometer radius.

=== Victims ===
According to hospital sources, besides DSP Mohammad Iqbal Khan, his gunman Irshad, driver Mohammad Mushtaq, Bashir Ahmad, Mohammad Irshad, Insaf Bibi, Irum Bibi, Mohammad Younis, Arsalan, Sabir, Abdul Sattar, Shahzeb and an unknown man were among the deceased.

The injured were identified as Bakhtullah, Mohammad Sharif, Asif Iqbal, Mulazim Hussain, Shah Jehan, Bashir Ahmad, Jamshed, Ghulam Hussain, Mohammad Ramzan, Rehmatullah, and an unidentified child while the son of Iqbal khan was also injured in the attack.

== Reactions ==
President of Pakistan, Asif Ali Zardari, Prime minister, Yousuf Raza Gilani, Speaker and Deputy Speaker of National Assembly, Fehmida Mirza and Faisal Karim Kundi, Chairman of Pakistan Tehreek-e-Insaf, Imran Khan, Emir Jamaat-e-Islami, Munawar Hassan and president of Pakistan Muslim League (N), Nawaz Sharif have condemned attack and offered condolence to families of victims. Chief Minister of Khyber Pakhtunkhwa, Ameer Haider Khan Hoti condemned the attack calling it "cowardly act of terrorism" and said that this type of incidents cannot deter government commitment of war against terrorism.
