= 2013 Dera Ismail Khan prison attack =

Prison attack in Pakistan

Dera Ismail Khan Prison attack of 2013
- Part of War in North-West Pakistan
Date	29 July 2013
Location	Central Jail Dera Ismail Khan, Dera Ismail Khan, Khyber Pakhtunkhwa, Pakistan 31°49′0″N 70°55′0″E
Result	Tehreek-e-Taliban Pakistan victory (300 prisoners freed)

Belligerents
Khyber Pakhtunkhwa Police	Tehreek-e-Taliban Pakistan

Strength
	150

Casualties and losses
4 killed and 7 injured	5 killed
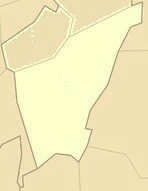
- Location of prison Central Jail Dera Ismail Khan (Pakistan)

On 29 July 2013, terrorists attacked on Dera Ismail Khan's central prison and freed more than 240 criminals including 35 high-profile terrorists. Tehreek-e-Taliban Pakistan claimed responsibility of attack.

== Background ==
On July 27, a letter marked “secret” and “most immediate” by the ISI addressed to the commissioner, deputy commissioner, deputy inspector general of police, district police officer and the superintendent of Dera Ismail Khan central jail, stated: “It has been reliably learnt that miscreants namely Umer Khitab and his associates affiliated with Gadanpur Group/Tehreek-e-Taliban Pakistan are planning to carry out terrorist attack against Central Jail – Dera Ismail Khan on the pattern similar to Bannu jailbreak in near future. According to information, miscreants are in possession of sketch/map of Jail and have reached in the vicinity of Dera Ismail Khan for this purpose.”

== Attack ==
The attackers first destroyed an armoured police vehicle outside prison and threw many Hand grenades on prison's security guards. According to a police official, militants were disguised in police uniform and were firing Rocket launchers from outside of prison, he said "Militants were firing rockets at the jail and I also heard gunfire from inside the building". Residents in Dera Ismail Khan reported hearing loud blasts and gunfires. About hundred militants (who were armed with Guns, mortars, Rocket-propelled grenades and bombs) attacked the prison. Militants launched their attack with series of explosion. Militants have also launched an attack on buildings surrounding the prison, including a radio station and a hospital. A nearby house was also reportedly attacked where the militants took the residents hostage and laid an ambush for security forces’ reinforcements. While attacking, the militants were shouting " God is great" and "Long live Taliban". The attackers then entered the prison and opened fires on police officers. The police officers fired and used Tear gas in retaliation. A resulting gun battle raged for three to four hours. During attack, four police officers and five attackers were killed while several injured. The militants managed to free 248 prisoners.

== Aftermath ==
Pakistani Taliban spokesman Shahidullah Shahid claimed responsibility for the attack, saying 150 militants took part and about 300 prisoners were freed. Eight of the attackers wore suicide vests and two detonated their explosives, Shahid told the Associated Press by telephone from an undisclosed location. Authorities captured nine prisoners who escaped and were searching for the others. Army soldiers were called in as reinforcements. A curfew had been imposed in Dera Ismail Khan and the nearby town of Tank while the search contented, One of the militants freed in the attack was Adnan Rasheed, who had recently gained attention by writing a letter to teenage education activist Malala Yousafzai, who was shot in the head by the Taliban in 2012. Rasheed said he wished the attack hadn't happened but told Malala that she had been targeted for speaking ill of the Taliban.
