= Hafiz Muhammad Siddique =

Pakistani scholar

- حافظ محمد صديق
- Title: Hafiz-ul-Millat

Personal life
- Born: 1819
- Died: 22 January 1890 (aged 70–71)

Religious life
- Religion: Islam
- Order: Qadiriyya

Muslim leader
- Students: Ghulam Muhammad Din Puri

H Muhammad Siddique (1819-1890; Sindhi: حافظ محمد صديق, title 'Hafiz-ul-milat'), was a Follower Of Hazrat Per Syed Muhammad Rashid Rozi Dhani Peer Sahab Pagara and a Sufi of the Qadiriyya order from Sindh and founder of school of Bharchundi Shareef Khanqah in Sindh.

== See also ==
- Ali Akbar Mahar
