= 2012 Dera Ismail Khan bombing =

Terrorist attack

- Part of War in North-West Pakistan and Sectarianism in Pakistan
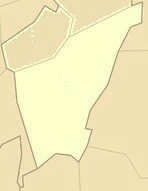
- Commissionery Bazar Dera Ismail Khan (Dera Ismail Khan) Commissionery Bazar Dera Ismail Khan (Pakistan)
- Location: 31°49′42.64″N 70°54′6.76″E; Commissionery Bazaar, Dera Ismail Khan, Khyber Pakhtunkhwa, Pakistan
- Date: 24 November 2012
- Target: Shia Mourners
- Attack type: Planted Bombing (Police claimed); Suicide attack (Taliban claimed)
- Weapons: Improvised explosive device (Police claimed); Explosive belt(Taliban claimed)
- Deaths: 8
- Injuries: 83
- Victim: Shias
- Perpetrator: Tehreek-i-Taliban Pakistan (claimed responsibility)
- No. of participants: 1 (Tehreek-i-Taliban Pakistan claimed)
- Motive: Islamic Extremism; Anti-Shi'ism

On 24 November 2012, the day of Ashura, an explosion took place in Dera Ismail Khan, Pakistan on the crowd of Shiite who were mourning according to their ideology. Ashura is the holiest of days for followers of Shia Islam and marks the anniversary of the martyrdom of Hussain, grandson of the Islamic prophet Muhammad, who was martyred at the battle of Karbala in 680. 8 people were killed while more than 80 people were injured.

== Background ==
On the day of Ashoura, followers of Shia Islam mourn and a large crowd of people gather as a procession. In Pakistan, Shi'ites are condemned and attacked by Taliban, specially on Ashoura when they join. Despite being in high-proof security, Shi'ites are still attacked by militants. The attack was followed by an explosion took place on 22nd day of current month (two days before attack).

== Bombing ==
The bomb exploded inside procession of large crowd. According to police, the bomb weighted 10 Kilograms and latter Bomb Disposal squad confirmed that 8 to 10 kilograms of material was used in the bomb. According to police, the bomb was planted in a shop and was controlled by remote controlled device while the spokesman of Tehreek-i-Taliban Pakistan claimed responsibility saying "It was a suicide attack." Seven people including four children died soon after the blast while a man died later in hospital from his wounds. Akhtar Nawaz, an official at District Headquarter Hospital (where injures were brought for treatment) said that three children were dead on arrival while later the chief of city police Khalid Sohail said that children who died were aged between six and eleven.

== Reactions ==
President of Pakistan, Asif Ali Zardari condemned the attack. Many other political leader also condemned the attack and offer condolence to families of victims. Interior Minister of Pakistan Rehman Malik has sought a report from the IGP and directed for an immediate inquiry into the incident.

A mourning day was observed in Dera Ismail Khan on 26 November in condemnation of the attack. Leaders of Ahle Sunnat and Shi'ites had jointly given the mourning call.

=== Security forces ===
Security forces suspended Mobile Service in the major cities. Wireless network was blocked in Karachi, Quetta and parts of KPK and Punjab. 5,000 police officers were expected to Patrol in streets of Karachi.

=== Perpetrators ===
Tehreek-i-Taliban Pakistan claimed responsibility of attack. "We carried the attack against Shi'ites", Ehsanullah Ehsan, the spokesman of TTP told AFP from an undisclosed location. He also said that we have 20 to 25 suicide bombers across Pakistan and government cannot stop them at all.
