= Dera Ismail Khan Cantonment =

- Cantonment
- Location within Khyber Pakhtunkhwa Location within Pakistan
- Coordinates: 31°49′37″N 70°55′12″E
- Country: Pakistan
- Province: Khyber Pakhtunkhwa
- District: Dera Ismail Khan
- Tehsil: Dera Ismail Khan

Population (2017)
  - Total: 5,697
- Time zone: UTC+5 (PST)

Dera Ismail Khan Cantonment is a cantonment adjacent to the Dera Ismail Khan city in Khyber Pakhtunkhwa, Pakistan. The headquarters of Dera Ismail Khan Forest Division is located in the cantonment.
