= January 2007 Dera Ismail Khan suicide bombing =

Terrorist incident in Pakistan

- Part of Sectarianism in Pakistan and War in North-West Pakistan
- Dera Ismail Khan (Pakistan)
- Location: 31.5°N 70.7°E; Dera Ismail Khan, KPK, Pakistan
- Date: January 29, 2007
- Target: Shi'ites
- Attack type: Suicide bombing
- Weapon: Explosive belt
- Deaths: 2 (+1 bomber)
- Injuries: 7
- Victim: Security forces
- No. of participants: 1 (suicide bomber)
- Motive: Sectarianism

On 29 January 2007, a suicide bomber blew himself up, in Dera Ismail Khan, Khyber Pakhtunkhwa, Pakistan, killing a policeman and a civilian and wounding 7 others. The incident happened during the month of Muharram on the day of Ashura, the holiest day of the year for Shi'ites.

== Background ==
Ashura is the holiest day of the year for Shi'ites as it marks the anniversary of the martyrdom of Hussain, the grandson of Muhammad. On the day of Ashura, Shi'ites observe mourning and in Pakistan, they have often been targeted by terrorists on this day.

== Bombing ==
According to police officials, the bomber was a teenager who refused to be checked at a check post and instead detonated himself. 7 people were injured while three, including the bomber, were killed.

== See also ==
- Terrorist incidents in Pakistan in 2007
