= Chowgalla =

Centre of Dera Ismail Khan, Pakistan

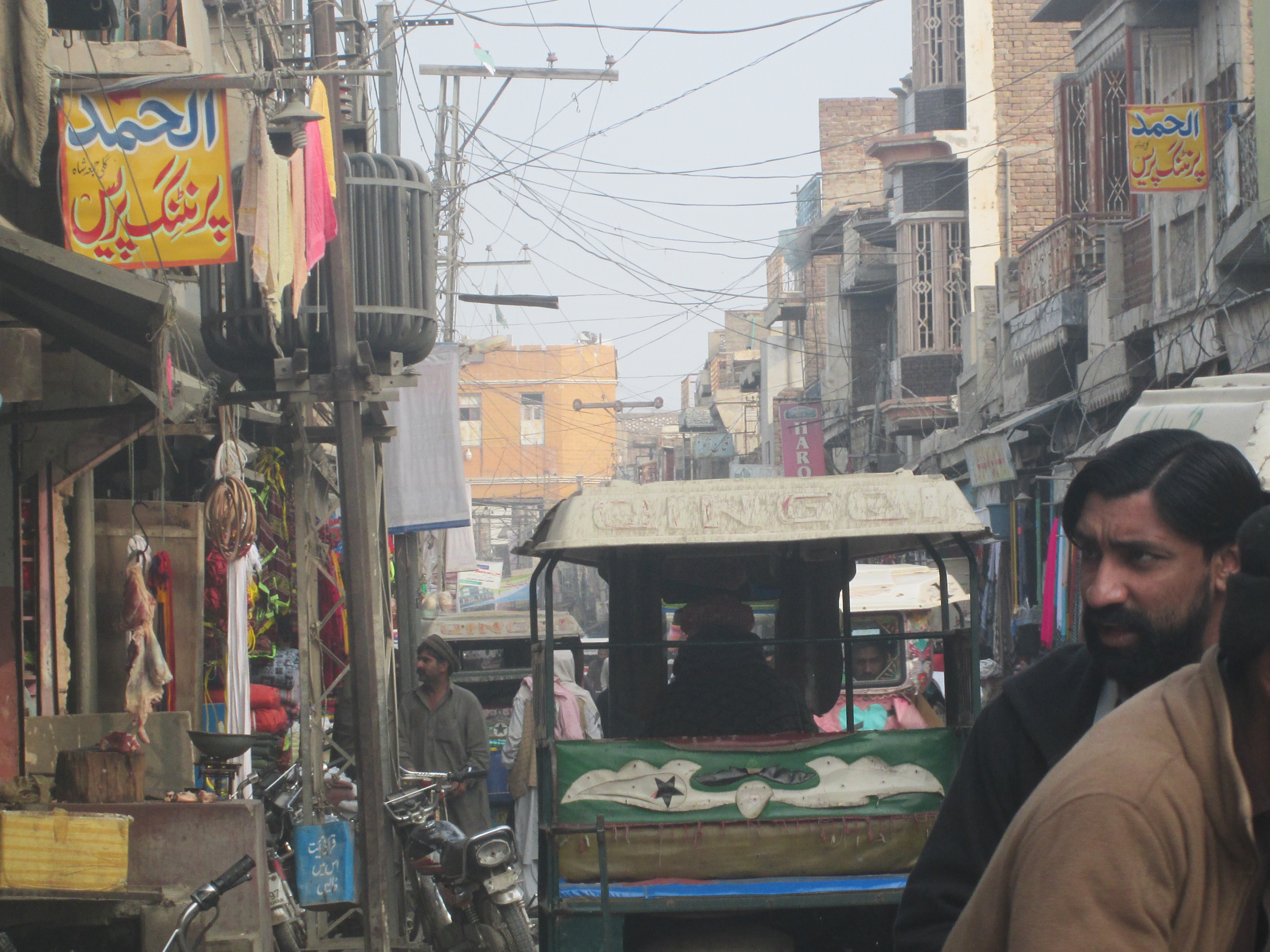
Chowgalla as seen from Bazar Kalan street

Chowgalla (also called Chogallia) is the centre of Dera Ismail Khan, a city in Khyber-Pakhtunkhwa Province (formerly North West Province NWFP) of Pakistan. The majority of the population speaks Saraiki.

== Geography ==
It is situated on the west bank of the Indus River, 320 km west of Lahore and 190 km northwest of Multan. The total population of the city is 86,969 according to the census of 1998. It is a gateway to the four major bazaars of Dera Ismail Khan: Kalan Bazaar, Muslim Bazaar, Topanwala Bazaar, and Bhatiya Bazaar. These four bazaars are laid in each of the cardinal directions, with all four converging in the town's centre.

== Economy ==
The markets and shops of all types cater to the needs of the Derawal people.

== History ==
In 1940, the British government built a strong defence structure at the location of Chowgalla in which police and militia could be positioned as needed. For defence, four big gates were installed on all four sides by the British government to cut the link to the four bazaars during a conflict between Hindus and Muslims. These gates remain the same today. They are closed on the day of Ashura, 10th Moharam-ul-Haram, Imam Hussain's Shahadat, until the passing of the procession.
