= May 2009 Dera Ismail Khan bombings =

Terrorist incident in Pakistan

- Part of War in North-West Pakistan
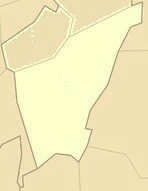
- May 2009 Dera Ismail Khan bombings (Dera Ismail Khan) May 2009 Dera Ismail Khan bombings (Pakistan)
- Location: 31.5°N 70.3°E; Dera Ismail Khan, Khyber Pakhtunkhwa, Pakistan
- Date: 14 May 2009
- Target: KP Police
- Attack type: Bombing
- Weapon: Hand Grenade
- Deaths: 5
- Injuries: 9
- Victim: Police officers
- Motive: War against Police force

On May 14, 2009, three Hand Grenades were thrown on Police officers in Dera Ismail Khan. A motorcycle rider threw a hand grenade on police emergency office. According to local Police Chief of city, Muhammad Iqbal, 5 police officers were wounded in first grenade's explosion three of whom were seriously hurt. In the next half an hour, two more grenades were lobbed on two police posts near a bus stand. Four police officers were injured in next two explosions. In all the three explosions, 9 police officers were injured. All injured were brought to a state–run hospital. Ashiq Saleem, doctor at hospital, said, "we have received eight injures, three of them are serious, all of them are police officers." No group have yet claimed responsibility for attacks.

On 28 May, 14 days after attack, another explosion took place near security checkpost in the city which killed 5 people.
