= Basti Tarkhananwali =

Village in Khyber Pakhtunkhwa, Pakistan

- Village
- Basti Tarkhananwali, Dera Ismail Khan
- Location in Pakistan
- Coordinates: 31.8304°N 70.8843°E
- Country: Pakistan
- Province: Khyber Pakhtunkhwa
- District: Dera Ismail Khan District
- Elevation: 175 m (574 ft)
- Time zone: UTC+5 (PST)
- Postal code: 29100

Basti Tarkhananwali is a village located in the Dera Ismail Khan District of Khyber Pakhtunkhwa, Pakistan. It lies in the southern part of the province and is situated near the Indus River. The village primarily relies on agriculture and has a population involved in farming and related activities.

== Location ==
Basti Tarkhananwali is located at 31.8304°N 70.8843°E longitude. It is a rural settlement within the Dera Ismail Khan District in Khyber Pakhtunkhwa. The village is situated along the Indus River, which is an essential geographical feature for both agriculture and local transportation in the region.

== See also ==
- Dinpur
