= January 2009 Dera Ismail Khan bombings =

Terrorist incident in Pakistan

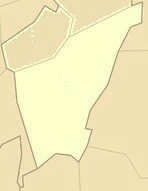
- January 2009 Dera Ismail Khan bombings (Dera Ismail Khan) January 2009 Dera Ismail Khan bombings (Pakistan)
- Location: 31°50′38.97″N 70°54′45.38″E; Polytechnic College and Town Hall, Dera Ismail Khan, Khyber Pakhtunkhwa, Pakistan
- Date: 4 January 2009; 26 January 2009
- Target: Police officers
- Attack type: Bombing, Suicide attack, Shooting
- Weapons: Hand Grenade, Explosive belt, Planted bomb
- Deaths: 16
- Injuries: 52
- Victims: Police and Journalists
- Defender: KPK Police

January 2009 Dera Ismail Khan bombings involved two incidents in Dera Ismail Khan. The first occurred on 4 January in front of Polytechnic College, killing ten people, including four policemen and two journalists, and injuring 28. The other occurred when a bomb planted on motorcycle exploded on 26 January near town hall, killing 6 people and injuring 24.

== Attacks ==
On 4 January at around 18:55, a hand grenade was thrown in front of Polytechnic College, where Frontier Corps had established a checkpoint to maintain security during Muharram. After the grenade's explosion, police and forensics officers arrived at and began examining the site. Two journalists were also on the site when a suicide bomber between 15 and 18 years of age, blew himself up, detonating 10 to 15 kilograms of material. Ten people, including four policemen and two journalists, were killed while 28 were injured out whom, most were police officers. The injured were brought to District Headquarter Hospital. Some people reported hearing shots fired on the Edhi ambulance when it was taking journalists to the hospital. The two journalists who lost their lives were Muhammad Imran from Daily Eitedal and Tahir Awan Daily Apna Akhbar. After the attack, patrolling was enhanced in the city. The explosion also led to disruption in electric service.

On 26 January, a bomb planted on a motorcycle exploded near Central Jail outside Town Hall. Local police officer, Abdur Rasheed said, "The bomb went off minutes after a provincial lawmaker, Khalifa Abdul Qayyum, had passed by the area. It is not clear whether Qayyum was the target, but our investigation teams have rushed to the site of the blast to collect evidence."

== Reactions ==
President of Pakistan, Asif Ali Zardari condemned attack, calling it cowardly act of terrorism. Zardari and Prime Minister Yousuf Raza Gilani have asked for timely investigation of the blast and directed the hospital authorities to provide the best possible treatment to the victims. Chief Minister of Khyber Pakhtunkhwa Ameer Haider Khan Hoti and Emir of Jamat-e-Islami Siraj ul Haq have also condemned attack. Governor of Khyber Pakhtunkhwa Owais Ahmed Ghani said, "elements behind this inhuman and un-Islamic act would be brought to justice".
