= Terrorist incidents in Pakistan in 2008 =

In 2008, Pakistan saw 40 terrorist attacks, which caused 154 fatalities and 256 injuries.

== January ==
- 10 January:- 24 people were killed and 73 injured in a suicide attack when the policemen were deliberately targeted outside Lahore High Court before the scheduled lawyer's protest against the government in Punjab's capital, Lahore. This attack was first of its kind in Lahore since the start of the war on terror.
- 14 January:- At least 10 people were killed and over 50 wounded when a bomb exploded in Quaidabad, Punjab. The bomb was planted on a bicycle and it went off during the early hours in a vegetable market in Karachi, Sindh.
- 17 January:- At least 12 people were killed and 25 others injured, three of them critically, when a suicide bomber blew himself up at the crowded Mirza Qasim Baig Imambargah in Mohalla Janghi, Kohati, in North-West Frontier Province's capital city Peshawar.

== February ==
- 4 February:- At least 10 people were killed and 27 others injured, when a suicide bomber crashed his bike into an armed forces bus carrying students and officials of Army Medical College, near the General Headquarters in Rawalpindi, Punjab. This became the eleventh attack on the army, the fourth in Rawalpindi near GHQ, and first of its kind on medical students.
- 9 February:- At least 25 people died and 35 were injured after a powerful explosion hit an opposition election rally in Charsadda, NWFP. The attack targeted ANP, a secular party, one of whose leaders, Fazal-ur-Rehman Atakhail, was assassinated 7 February in Karachi, triggering widespread protests. Possible conspirators of the latest attack could be the Islamist Taliban-al-Qaeda nexus operating in NWFP.
- 11 February:- A suicide attack on a public meeting in Miranshah, North Waziristan, Federally Administered Tribal Areas, left at least eight people dead and a dozen wounded, including a candidate for the National Assembly. It was the second attack on ANP's election gathering in two days.
- 16 February:- A suicide bomber rammed his explosive-laden vehicle on the election meeting of Pakistan Peoples Party, the party of the slain former Prime Minister Benazir Bhutto in Parachinar, Kurram Agency, FATA. The attack left at least 47 people dead and 150 injured according to the Interior Ministry. It was the fourth such attack on PPP's political workers within a year; two of them targeting the former PPP leader Benazir Bhutto.
- 18 February:- At least 24 people were killed and nearly 200 were injured in election-related violence across the country on the eve of general election, Aaj TV reported.
- 22 February:- A roadside bomb near the town of Matta, Swat District, NWFP, killed at least 13 members of a wedding party and left about a dozen injured. An army spokesman said the bomb had been detonated by remote control. Women and children were among the casualties.
- 25 February:- The Army's top medic Lt Gen Mushtaq Baig was killed, along with the driver and security guard, when a suicide attack ripped apart the vehicle he was travelling in at 2:45pm local time near Army General Headquarters in Rawalpindi. At least 5 other passersby were also killed and 20 injured in the incident. Baig was the highest-ranking officer to be killed in Pakistan since the September 11 attacks. This attack was the twelfth such incidence against the Army and fifth one near GHQ.
- 29 February:- At least 38 people were killed and 75 injured when a suicide bomber blew himself up in Mingora, Swat District, NWFP, during the funeral of a senior police officer who had been killed hours earlier in Lakki Marwat, NWFP. The police DSP was killed along with three other policemen when their vehicle was hit in a roadside bomb earlier in the day. Witnesses said the suicide attack took place when a police party was presenting a gun salute in honour of the slain police officer in a school ground in Mingora city at about 8 pm.

== March ==
- 2 March:- At least 42 people were killed and 58 injured in a suicide attack, when the bomber struck the meeting of tribal elders and local officials in Darra Adam Khel, FATA. The town of Darra was the center of violent clashes earlier in January when the militants took over the Kohat Tunnel that connected Peshawar with Kohat, NWFP. After the onslaught of security forces to take back the tunnel, the fighting resulted in the deaths of 13 troops and 70 militants.
- 4 March:- Eight persons were killed and 24 others injured when two suicide bombers blew themselves up in the parking area of the Pakistan Navy War College located in the city of Lahore. It was the first time a Pakistani naval institution was targeted by the militants (the army has been targeted at least eight times outside the war zone and Air Force twice) since the ongoing war on terror in general and post-siege of Lal Masjid in particular. The college attack was carried out by two suicide attackers, the first one to clear the way for the second one; and the second one to do the damage.
- 11 March:- At least 24 people were killed and more than 200 wounded in twin suicide bombings in Lahore. One of the attacks ripped apart Federal Investigation Agency (FIA) building killing 21, including 16 policemen. The other one hit the upmarket locality of Model Town, exploding close to Bilawal House, associated with PPP leaders Benazir Bhutto and her husband Asif Ali Zardari.
- 15 March:- An attack occurred when a bomb was hurled over a wall surrounding an Islamabad restaurant. Four of the 12 people wounded in the bombing were U.S. FBI agents. In addition to wounding the agents, the explosion killed a Turkish woman and wounded a fifth American, three Pakistanis, a person from the United Kingdom and another from Japan.

== April ==
- 9 April:- Riots in Karachi kill 9 people and wound many others with 40 vehicles getting torched after two groups of lawyers scuffle that begin after PML-Q leaders, former CM Sindh Arbab Ghulam Rahim and former federal minister Sher Afgan Niazi are maltreated ahead of government formation in the provinces of Sindh and Punjab.
- 17 April:- At least 20 people were killed and dozens others injured in the clashes between two belligerent factions in Khyber District, FATA.

== May ==
- 6 May:- At least four people killed in a suspected suicide attack in Bannu, NWFP, amid signs the truce with militants was breaking down, negotiations for which started in March.
- 18 May:- A bomb attack targeting the Army's Punjab Regimental Center market in the city of Mardan, NWFP, killed at least 13 people, including four soldiers and injured more than 20. This was the second attack in Mardan in a month after a car bombing on 25 April killed three and injured 26 people. This attack was the thirteenth one on the army since the start of military operations.
- 19 May:- At least four people were killed and another two injured in a remote-controlled bomb blast outside a mosque in the Mamund Tehsil of Bajaur Agency.
- 26 May:- Seven people were killed and five others injured in what appeared to be incidents of sectarian violence in Dera Ismail Khan, NWFP.

== June ==
- 2 June:- The Danish embassy in Islamabad was attacked with a car bomb, killing six people. A post purportedly from al-Qaeda's Mustafa Abu al-Yazid appeared on the Internet a day after the attack claiming responsibility. The statement mentions the publication of "insulting drawings" and the refusal to "apologise for publishing them" referring to the Jyllands-Posten Muhammad cartoons controversy.
- 9 June:- Sufi Muhammad, leader of the TNSM, survived a remote-controlled bombing initiated by local Taliban in Peshawar, in which four policemen were injured.
- 16 June:- A bomb blast inside a Shia mosque killed at least four people and wounded two others in Dera Ismail Khan.

== July ==
- 6 July:- A suicide bomber killed 19 people in an attack targeting policemen deployed at a rally observing the first anniversary of an army raid on the Islamabad's Lal Masjid.
- 7 July:- A string of small explosions, apparently from bombs, wounded at least 37 people in Karachi, rattling Pakistan a day after a deadly suicide attack in capital of Pakistan.
- 2 August:- At least eight police and security workers were killed when a remote-controlled bomb exploded near their vehicle in Mingora, Swat.
- 31 July – 4 August:- A total of 136 people were killed in Swat Valley in a week of fighting between the security forces and pro-Taliban militants. The casualties included at least 94 militants, 14 soldiers and around 28 civilians.

== August ==
- 9 August:- Militants stormed a police post in the village of Kingargalai of the Buner District, killing eight policemen.
- 12 August:- A bomb targeting a Air Force bus carrying personnel from a military base killed 13 people and wounded 11 others on Tuesday on a major road near the center of Peshawar. Taliban forces reportedly took responsibility. The attack was seen as retaliation for Pakistani airstrikes in Bajaur Agency, a militant stronghold near the border with Afghanistan. Five of the dead were air force personnel and the eight others were bystanders.
- 13 August:- Eight people, including two policemen, were killed and over 20, including 12 policemen, were injured after an alleged suicide bomber blew himself up near a police station in Lahore on the eve of Independence Day celebrations. On the same day, six people were killed and 19 others, four of them policemen, were injured in explosions in Hub and Uthal, a hand-grenade attack in Panjgur and shooting incidents in Kharan and Turbat towns in Balochistan, while leader of the banned outfit Amr Bil Maroof Wa Nahi Anil Munkar Haji Namdar was shot dead when he was delivering a sermon in Bara tehsil. Haji Namdar had earlier escaped a suicide attack on 1 May 2008 in which 17 people were injured.
- 7 August – 18 August:- Clashes mainly between the Toori and Bangash tribes, but which involved other local tribes, in the Kurram Agency left at least 287 people dead and 373 injured in 12 consecutive days of fighting. In the later incidents, pro-Taliban militants were involved too, after which the local tribesmen asked the government to flush out the militants.
- 19 August:- 32 people, seven policemen and two health officials among them, were killed and 55 others injured when a suicide bomber blew himself up near the emergency ward of the District Headquarters Hospital in Dera Ismail Khan. Tehrik-i-Taliban Pakistan claimed responsibility for the attack.
- 21 August:- At least 70 people were killed and 67 others injured when two suicide bombers blew themselves up outside the gates of the state run Pakistan Ordnance Factories, Wah Cantonment. Tehrik-i-Taliban Pakistan claimed responsibility for the attack. This attack was the fourteenth such attack on the symbol of Pakistan Army since the start of military operations in 2004.
- 21 August:- An influential person of Ningulai in the Swat District, Musa Khan, was shot dead by unidentified assailants as soon as he stepped out of the mosque after prayers. His guards opened fire but the assailants managed to escape. A passerby, Islam Gul, also sustained injuries in the incident. Haji Musa Khan had escaped a bomb and a gun attack in recent past. Taliban spokesman Muslim Khan claimed responsibility for the killing and accused the tribal elder of being an active supporter of security forces.
- 23 August:- 20 people were killed when a suicide bomber rammed an explosive-laden car into a police station in Charbagh Tehsil of Swat valley of Khyber-Pakhtunkhwa. Tehrik-i-Taliban Pakistan claimed responsibility for the attack.
- 25 August:- 10 people were killed in a rocket attack targeting the house of a local member of provincial assembly (MPA) in Swat valley in Khyber-Pakhtunkhwa. As a result of the attack, ANP MPA Waqar Ahmed's brother and other family members were killed.
- 26 August:- Eight people were killed and more than 20 hurt in a bomb explosion at a roadside restaurant in the Model Town area on the outskirts of Islamabad on Tuesday.
- 28 August:- 9 people were killed and 15 others were injured in a bomb attack targeting a police van in the Bannu area of Khyber-Pakhtunkhwa.

== September ==
- 6 September:- At least 30 people were killed and 70 injured when a suicide car bomb struck a paramilitary checkpoint 20 km from Peshawar. The attack came during the voting to elect Asif Ali Zardari as the President of Pakistan and the marking of Defence Day.
- 10 September:- At least 25 worshippers were killed and 50 others injured in a grenade-and-gun attack in a mosque in the Maskanai area of Lower Dir District, northern part of Khyber-Pakhtunkhwa.
- 19 September:- A bomb exploded at an Islamic religious school in Quetta killing five people and wounding at least eight. The school was run by Jamiat Ulema-e-Islam, the religious party headed by Maulana Fazal-ur-Rehman.
- 20 September:- A massive truck bomb exploded outside the Marriott Hotel in Islamabad, killing at 57 people and wounding 266 others. The suicide attack believed to be carried by a single individual left a 20 feet (6.1 m) deep and 50 feet (15 m) wide crater, and was later owned by a little known group called Fidayeen-e-Islam. It was carried at local Iftar time, when the local and foreign residents had assembled together to have the Ramadan feast. The attack was significant as all the top political, diplomatic and military top brass was also dining in the nearby Prime Ministers Secretariat after the President's first parliamentary address.
- 22 September:- At least nine security personnel were killed in a suicide car-bomb attack on a checkpost in Swat District.
- 26 September:- A bomb attack on a train killed at least three people and fifteen others near the city of Bahawalpur. The bomb, which was kept on the railway track, blew up and derailed the passenger train. No one claimed responsibility for the attack.

== October ==
- 2 October:- A suicide attack targeted the house of ANP leader Asfandyar Wali Khan in Walibagh, Charsadda killing four people. Wali Khan survived the attack, as his bodyguard shot the suicide attacker in the head before he could reach Wali Khan. The guard was later killed as the attacker managed to detonate the bomb while on the ground. This was the fourth such attack on ANP, with the first two targeting ANP political rallies in Charsadda and Miranshah before February elections and one of them targeting ANP MPA in Swat.
- 6 October:- A suicide attacker managed to kill 20 people and injured 60 in the Punjabi town of Bhakkar, when he targeted the political gathering of Rashid Akbar Nawani, an MNA of PML-N. Nawani, though survived the attack, was hurt. This was the first such attack on PML-N, since the start of war on terrorism. This was a sectarian attack as Mr Nawani was Shia, and most of the party workers in the gathering were from the minority Shia sect.
- 9 October:- A suicide bomb attack on a main police headquarters in Islamabad killed at least eight and wounded at least another 8. The targeted area was the main police complex in the capital, containing training and residential facilities for police officers. Thousands of police are based at the centre. Another bomb occurred as the country's spy chief briefed politicians on the security situation. Eleven people were killed in the Upper Dir District of Khyber-Pakhtunkhwa when a roadside bomb exploded near a police van carrying prisoners. Four schoolchildren in a passing bus were also among the dead.
- 10 October:- A suicide bomber drove his car into a meeting of 600 people in Orakzai Agency, which was being held in open ground and blew himself up. The meeting was a council of local leaders discussing to raise a militia to evict Taliban from the region. The attack claimed at least 110 lives and injured more than 200.
- 13 October:- A remote-controlled bomb detonated near the vehicle of a secular political leader, who was injured along with four others. This follows a string of attacks against lawmakers and government officials; and was also the second this month aimed at the Awami National Party. The attack apparently targeted Shamin Khan, a member of the Pashtun secularist ANP, at 18:30 in Khyber-Pakhtunkhwa.
- 16 October:- A suicide bomber rammed an explosives-laden vehicle into a police station in the restive Swat Valley region, killing four people and destroying the building in Mingora.
- 19 October:- A separatist group, Baloch Republic Army, claimed responsibility for the bomb blast in northwestern Balochistan province, which killed at least three people and injured six. The blast occurred in a bazar of the Dera Bugti district, and the remote-controlled bomb was planted in a motorcycle.
- 26 October:- At least 11 people, seven of them Frontier Corps personnel and three Khasadars, were killed and five injured on Sunday in a suicide attack near Ghalaanai in Mohmand Agency.
- 27 October:- Two persons were killed and 12 others injured, some of them seriously, in a bomb blast near the District Court Complex in Quetta.
- 31 October:- At least eight people were killed and 20 injured in a suspected suicide bombing targeting the policeman in the north-western city of Mardan.

== November ==
- 2 November:- Eight Pakistani soldiers were killed in a suicide bomb attack on a security checkpoint near Wana, the main town in South Waziristan.
- 4 November:- At least seven persons, including three security officials, were killed and six injured in a suicide attack on a security force checkpost in Hangu District on Tuesday morning.
- 6 November:- 22 tribesmen were killed and 45 injured when a suicide bomber blew himself up at a Salarzai jirga in Bajaur Agency on Thursday. The blast targeted a lashkar (volunteer militia) in Batmalani, about 40 kilometres northeast of agency headquarters Khar.
- 11 November:- A suicide bomber blew himself up at a packed Qayyum Stadium in Peshawar on Tuesday, killing four people and wounding 13. Khyber-Pakhtunkhwa Governor Owais Ahmed Ghani had just left the venue and senior provincial minister Bashir Bilour was on his way out. Bashir Bilour, the apparent target, said that two of his guards were among the dead and three had been injured.
- 12 November:- Five people were killed as a suicide bomber rammed an explosives-filled bus into the gates of a school in Charsadda District. Two others were killed as troops fired in retaliation. Fifteen people including soldiers and civilians were injured.
- 13 November:- TTP captured of military convoy
- 17 November:- At least three troops were killed when a suicide bomber rammed his explosives-laden vehicle into a security checkpost in Swat's Khawazakhela area.
- 19 November:- A former head of the army's elite commando force Special Service Group, Maj-Gen (R) Ameer Faisal Alavi, and his driver were gunned down near Islamabad in the morning. Alvi, who commanded the SSG during the first major assault on militants in Angoor Ada in South Waziristan in 2004, was killed near his home while driving to work on Islamabad Highway near the PWD Housing Society in the Koral police precinct. This attack was the fifteenth such attack on the army outside war zone, and the sixth one in the vicinity of Rawalpindi, the site of Army GHQ.
- 20 November:- A suicide bomber killed at least nine people and injured four others on Thursday at a mosque in Mamoond tehsil of Bajaur Agency.
- 21 November:- Eight people were killed and 17 others injured in a blast during the funeral of a cleric near the bus stand in the morning in Dera Ismail Khan. The bombing took place at Bannu Ada in Dera Ismail Khan killing 8.

Sectarianism in the city rose in 2007-2009 span. More than 8 people died each month from sectarian violence. The November 2008 bombing was part of series of attacks against Shi'i.

- 22 November:- Six people were killed and 15 others injured when a suicide bomber blew himself up in a mosque in Tandaro area of Tall in Hangu District on Saturday. While at least three people including a teenager were injured in a series of three explosions near the Alhamra Cultural Complex in Lahore late on Saturday, where the international World Performing Arts Festival was in progress.
- 28 November:- Nine people, including four police, were killed and 16 others injured when a suicide bomber rammed his explosive-laden coach into a police vehicle on the Peshawar-Bannu Road in Domel area of Bannu on Friday.

== December ==
- 1 December:- Ten people were killed and 49 others injured when a suicide bomber blew up an explosive-laden truck near the Sangota security post, some seven kilometres north-east of Mingora on Monday.
- 5 December:- At least 27 people were killed and dozens more wounded when two bombs exploded in crowded markets in northwest Pakistan. A blast in the heart of Peshwar killed 21 and created a 5-foot-deep (1.5 m) crater. Just hours earlier six people died in a car bomb explosion at a market in the semi-autonomous Orakzai tribal district. No one immediately claimed responsibility for the two attacks.
- 28 December:- At least 36 people were killed in a suspected car bomb attack near a polling station in a government school in Buner District on Sunday. 16 people were injured in the blast believed to have been carried out to disrupt the by-election for a National Assembly seat.
