= August 2008 Dera Ismail Khan suicide bombing =

Terrorist incident in Pakistan

2008 Dera Ismail Khan suicide bombing
- Part of War in North-West Pakistan
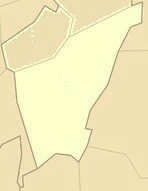
- DHQ Hospital (Dera Ismail Khan) DHQ Hospital (Khyber Pakhtunkhwa) DHQ Hospital (Pakistan)
- Location: 31°49′20.6508″N 70°54′41.2128″E; District Head Quarter Hospital, Dera Ismail Khan, Khyber Pakhtunkhwa, Pakistan
- Date: August 19, 2008
- Target: Shia protesters
- Attack type: Suicide attack
- Weapon: Explosive belt
- Deaths: 32 (+1 attacker)
- Injuries: 55
- Victims: Shia protesters and Police officers (at the spot)
- Perpetrator: Tehreek-i-Taliban Pakistan
- No. of participants: 1
- Defenders: Pakistan Army; KPK Police
- Motive: Retaliation against Operation Sherdill in Bajaur Agency.

The August 2008 Dera Ismail Khan suicide bombing took place on 19 August 2008, near the Emergency Ward of District Headquarter Hospital in Dera Ismail Khan, killing 32, including 7 policemen. Tehreek-i-Taliban Pakistan claimed responsibility for the attack.

== Events ==
=== Bombing ===
Early in the day of the attack, a Shiite scholar Basit Ali was shot dead by gunmen. Many Shii gathered there to protest his death when a suicide bomber blew himself up in the crowd. The blast created many casualties, including the policemen who were controlling the crowd.

=== Aftermath ===
The Army took control of the area. The injured were brought to military and public hospitals. The blast led to fear of eruption between sects, leading many shops, markets and business centers to close. Section 144 was imposed and pillion-riding was banned for an indefinite period.

== Reactions ==
=== Shia Community ===
The Shia community observed a three-day mourning from Wednesday in the city for victims of attack.

=== Perpetrators ===
The spokesman of Tehreek-i-Taliban Pakistan Moulvi Omer claimed responsibility for the attack calling it a retaliation against Operation Sherdill and said that the suicide attacks would continue until the military stopped operations in Swat and Bajaur Agency. However Omer disagreed with public opinion of the motive of attack and said that the attack was not against religion but was against government authorities and security forces.

=== Victim's memorial ceremony ===
Three years after the attack, a memorial ceremony to honour the victims was held on 19 August 2011 and was attended by many people, including the relatives of 20 deceased and 25 injured who belonged to the same family.
