= 2009 Dera Ghazi Khan bombing =

Terrorist incident in Pakistan

A car bombing occurred on 15 December 2009 in a market located in the city of Dera Ghazi Khan in the southern region of Pakistan's most populous province, Punjab. At least 33 people were reported killed and 50 more injured.

== Bombing ==
The blast happened at around 2:45 pm local time. About 1,000 kg of explosives were estimated to have been used. The bomb exploded in front of the main gate of the house belonging to Zulfiqar Ali Khosa a senior adviser to the chief minister of Punjab and a politician belonging to Pakistan Muslim League (N). However, he was not at home and was not injured. Mr. Khosa had recently presided over a meeting of religious leaders that had called suicide-bombing un-Islamic. The bomb caused the whole market to collapse.

== Aftermath ==
Hassan Iqbal, the town commissioner, said "There are many people trapped in the rubble after the powerful blast demolished some 10 shops ... The rescue work is under way and we fear the toll may go up." Forty-six people were taken to the local hospital while seven critically wounded were shifted to the hospital in the nearby city of Multan. The chief minister announced financial aid of Rs 500,000 to the families of the dead, Rs 75,000 to those who were injured and Rs 50,000 to those with minor injuries.

== See also ==
- List of terrorist incidents in Pakistan since 2001
