= Dera Ismail Khan Tehsil =

Dera Ismail Khan Tehsil تحصیل ڈیره اسماعیل خان دېره اسماعيل خان تحصیل
- Tehsil
- Country: Pakistan
- Province: Khyber Pakhtunkhwa
- District: Dera Ismail Khan
- Seat: Dera Ismail Khan

Population (2017)
  - Tehsil: 724,895
  - Urban: 217,457
  - Rural: 507,438
- Time zone: UTC+5 (PST)
- Number of towns: 1
- Number of Union Councils: 21

Dera Ismail Khan Tehsil is a tehsil located in Dera Ismail Khan District, Khyber Pakhtunkhwa, Pakistan.

== Administration ==
The tehsil is administratively subdivided into 21 Union Councils, four of which form the headquarters - Dera Ismail Khan (DI Khan).

== History ==
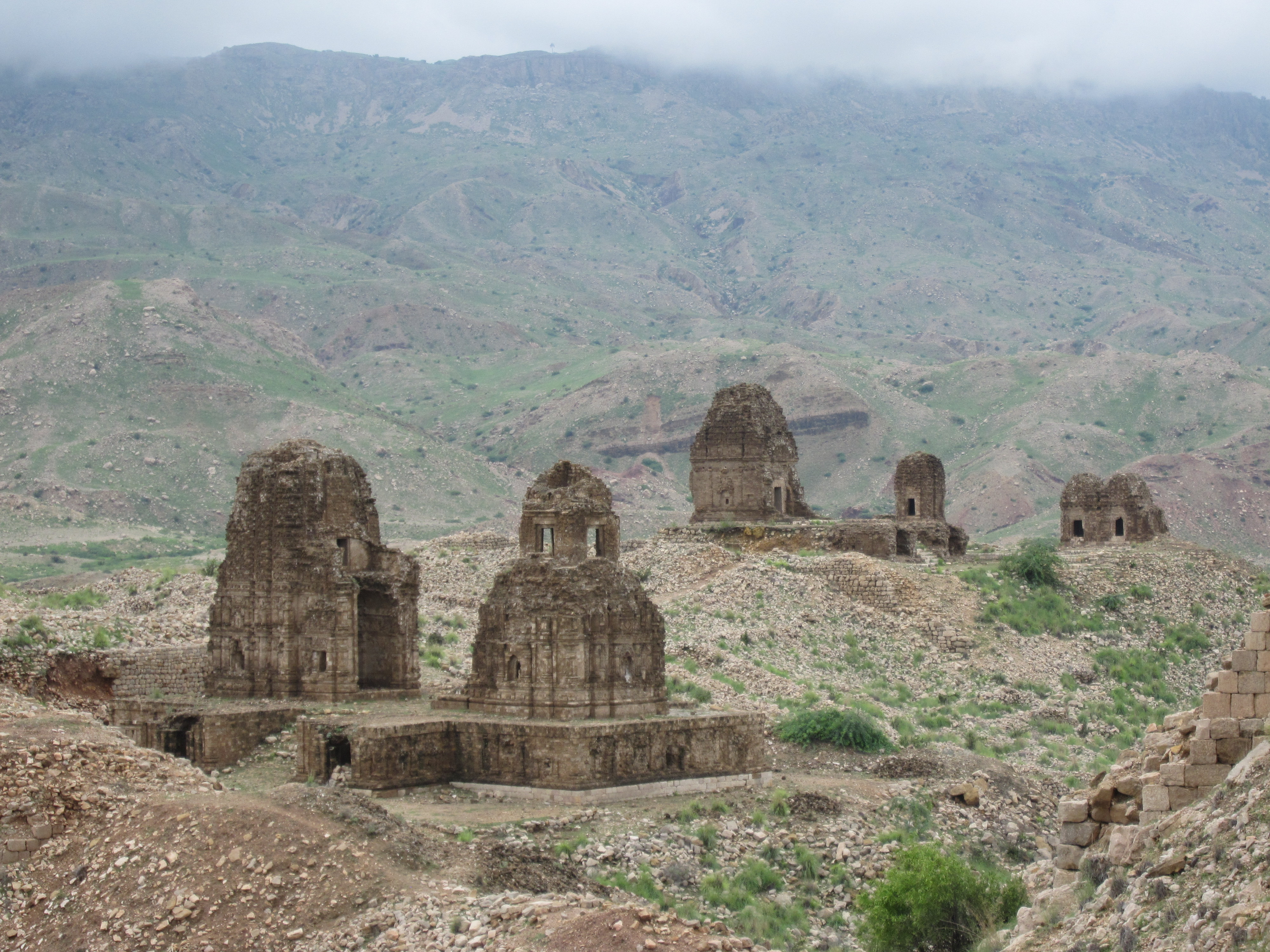
DI Khan is home to the millennium-old Hindu-Buddhist ruins at Kafir Kot.

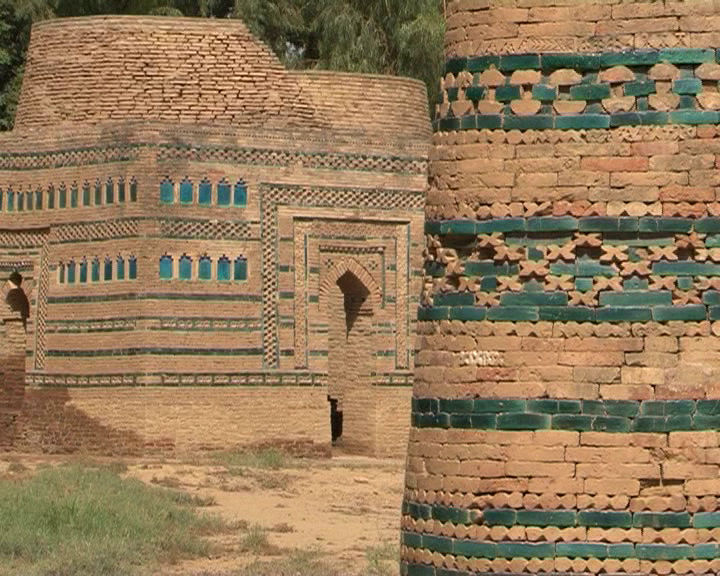
The Lal Marah Tombs.

The Dera Ismail Khan Tehsil is littered with ruins from ancient civilizations. DI Khan is home to the collection of Hindu ruins at two separate sites 20 miles apart, jointly known as Kafir Kot.

The region came under the influence of the Nanda Empire of ancient India from 300 BCE, and with the rise of Chandragupta Maurya, the region came under the complete control of the Mauryan Empire. Afterward, the region was briefly and nominally controlled by the Shunga Empire. However, with the decline of the Shungas, the region passed to local Hindu and Buddhist rulers, and interrupted by foreign rulers. Many of these foreign rulers, like the Indo-Parthians, Sakas, and Kushans converted to Hinduism and Buddhism, and promoted these Indian religions throughout Central and South Asia. The region reached its height under the Buddhist ruler Kanishka the Great. After the fall of the Kushans, the region came under the control of the Gupta Empire of ancient India. During the period, Hindu and Buddhist art and architecture flourished in the area.

With the decline of the imperial Guptas, the Hindu Shahis came to rule the area. The Hindu Shahis built two massive forts in the northern edges of Dera Ismail Khan. The forts were later renamed as "Kafirkots" (forts of the infidel). These Hindu Shahi forts were known for high towers and steep defensive walls. The Hindus also built many Hindu temples around the area, however, much of them are now in rubble. The Hindu Shahis remained in control of the area until their defeat by the Turkic Muslim army of Ghaznavids.

The Tehsil is part of what was historically territory inhabited by the Baluch people during medieval India, who were invited to settle the region by Shah Husseyn, of the Langah Sultanate of Multan. These Baluch settlers were displaced by, or assimilated into, later waves of Pashtun settlement.

During British rule in colonial India, Dera Ismail Khan was the chief tehsil of the old Dera Ismail Khan District. The population was 144,337, according to the 1901 census, an increase of almost 11,000 since the 1891 census (133,809) - it was headquartered at the town of Dera Ismail Khan and contained 250 villages.

== Politics ==
Dera Ismail Khan is represented in the National Assembly of Pakistan through two seats: NA-24 (DI Khan) and NA-25 (DI Khan cum Tank). The incumbent on these seats is Moulana Fazul Rehman of JUI-F from NA-24 and Dawer Khan Kundi of PTI from NA-25.

Traditionally, Dera Ismail Khan politics has been dominated by Jamiat Ullema Islam because of the charismatic and dynamic personality of Maulana Mufti Mahmood. After his death his son Fazlur Rehman became the chairman of JUI-F.
