= Pakistan in the war on terror =

Terrorism discourse in Pakistan

Pakistan's role in the war on terror is a widely discussed topic among policy-makers of various countries, political analysts and international delegates around the world. Pakistan has simultaneously received allegations of harbouring and aiding terrorists and commendation for its anti-terror efforts. Since 2001, the country has also hosted millions of Afghan refugees who fled the war in Afghanistan.

== Major developments ==
The Saudi born Zayn al-Abidn Muhammed Hasayn Abu Zubaydah, was arrested by Pakistani officials during a series of joint U.S. and Pakistan raids during the week of 23 March 2002. During the raid, the suspect was shot three times while trying to escape capture by military personnel. Zubaydah is said to be a high-ranking al-Qaeda official with the title of operations chief and in charge of running al-Qaeda training camps.

Later that year on 11 September 2002, Ramzi bin al-Shibh was arrested in Pakistan after a three-hour gunfight with police forces. Bin al-Shibh is known to have shared a room with Mohamed Atta in Hamburg, Germany and to be a financial backer of al-Qaeda operations.

It is said Ramzi bin al-Shibh was supposed to be another hijacker in September 11 attacks, however the U.S. Citizenship and Immigration Services rejected his visa application three times, leaving him to the role of financier. The trail of money transferred by bin al-Shibh from Germany to the United States links both Mohammad Atta and Zacarias Moussaoui.

On 1 March 2003, Khalid Shaikh Mohammed was arrested during CIA-led raids on the suburb of Rawalpindi, nine miles outside of the Pakistani capital of Islamabad. Mohammed at the time of his capture was the third highest-ranking official in al-Qaeda and had been directly in charge of the planning for the 11 September attacks. Other events Mohammed has been linked to include: ordering the killing of Wall Street Journal reporter Daniel Pearl, the USS Cole bombing, Richard Reid's attempt to blow up a civilian airliner with a shoe bomb, and the terrorist attack at the El Ghriba synagogue in Djerba, Tunisia. Khalid Shaikh Mohammed has described himself as the head of the al-Qaeda military committee.

Amidst all this, in 2006, Pakistan was accused by NATO commanding officers of aiding and abetting the Taliban in Afghanistan; but NATO later admitted that there was no known evidence against the Pakistan's Inter-Services Intelligence (ISI) or Pakistani government of sponsoring terrorism.

The Afghan government also accuses the ISI of providing help to militants, including protection to the Mullah Dadullah, Taliban's senior military commander killed in 2007, a charge denied by the Pakistani government. India, meanwhile continues to accuse Pakistan's ISI of planning several terrorist attacks in Kashmir and elsewhere in the Indian republic, including the 11 July 2006 Mumbai train bombings, which Pakistan alleges is due to "homegrown" insurgencies. Many other countries like Afghanistan and the UK have also accused Pakistan of State-sponsored terrorism and financing terrorism.

The upswing in American military activity in Pakistan and neighbouring Afghanistan corresponded with a great increase in American military aid to the Pakistan government. In the three years before the attacks of 11 September, Pakistan received approximately $9 million in American military aid.

In the three years after, the number increased to $4.2 billion, making it the country with the maximum funding post 9/11. Such a huge inflow of funds has raised concerns that these funds were given without any accountability, as the end uses not being documented, and that large portions were used to suppress civilians' human rights and to purchase weapons to contain domestic problems like the Balochistan unrest.

In December 2016, The Spectator reported that Pakistan is winning its war on terror. The article reported the major steps taken by the Nawaz Sharif, during his third term as the Prime Minister of Pakistan, which has resulted in an overall drop in violence.

The Guardian reported that in 2016, Narendra Modi, Prime Minister of India referred to Pakistan as the "mothership of terrorism", as part of a reprised campaign to increase international pressure on Pakistan for allegedly harboring and supporting militant groups.

In August 2017, The Guardian reported that as part of a new US strategy in Afghanistan by the Trump administration, more pressure was to be put on Pakistan over alleged support for insurgent groups, with President Trump saying in a televised statement that "we can no longer be silent about Pakistan's safe havens for terrorist organisations, the Taliban and other groups that pose a threat to the region and beyond." The new strategy was supported by Afghan government officials, a spokesman for the Afghan president said that "this is the first time the US government is coming with a very clear-cut message to Pakistan to either stop what you're doing or face the negative consequences." Pakistani security officials rejected the statements, stating, "They are shifting blame to Pakistan" and "Pakistan itself is the victim of terrorism. We are fighting militants and have conducted many ground and aerial operations and destroyed their sanctuaries. We want to eradicate them physically and ideologically.". As part of a regional approach, Trump said he would encourage India to play more of a role (whom are already providing economic and humanitarian aid to Afghanistan), former officials and analysts have pointed out that the fear of a greater Indian presence in Afghanistan was the justification used by Pakistan's military and intelligence leaders to maintain backing for Afghan militants, as a buffer against Indian influence.

== Northwest Pakistan ==
In Khyber Pakhtunkhwa the Pakistani Army captured or killed numerous al-Qaeda operatives such as Khalid Shaikh Mohammed. Pakistani authorities have noticed a relatively greater presence of IS influence in Balochistan, confronts growing threat from Khorasan Province group.

== Training ground for European militants ==
In 2009, a politically unstable Pakistan emerged as a new global hub for anti-West militancy, but, because of the constant threat of US attacks, recruits were reportedly more likely to spend their time under instruction and in training than carrying out assertive action. In his report on the matter, focusing on an alarming influx of European extremists, Reuters security correspondent William Maclean wrote,

Long a favored destination of British militants of Pakistani descent, Pakistan's northwestern tribal areas are now attracting Arabs and Europeans of Arab ancestry who three years ago would probably have gone to Iraq to fight U.S. forces.

With the Iraq war apparently winding down, security sources say, the lure for these young men is to fight U.S. forces in neighboring Afghanistan or to gain the skills to carry out attacks back home in the Middle East, Africa or the West.

One consequence: Western armies in Afghanistan increasingly face the possibility of having to fight their own compatriots.

He added that the matter was likely to surface in a meeting on 6 May 2009 between United States President Barack Obama, Pakistani President Asif Ali Zardari and Afghan President Hamid Karzai, the first-mentioned looking to bring an end to the employment of Pakistan's tribal zones as a launching pad for al Qaeda activity around the world.

== See also ==
- Terrorism in Pakistan
- Death of Osama bin Laden
- Pakistan–United States military relations
