= Dera Ismail Khan =

Dera Ismail Khan: ڈیره اسماعیل خان (Saraiki); ډيره اسماعیل خان (Pashto)
- City
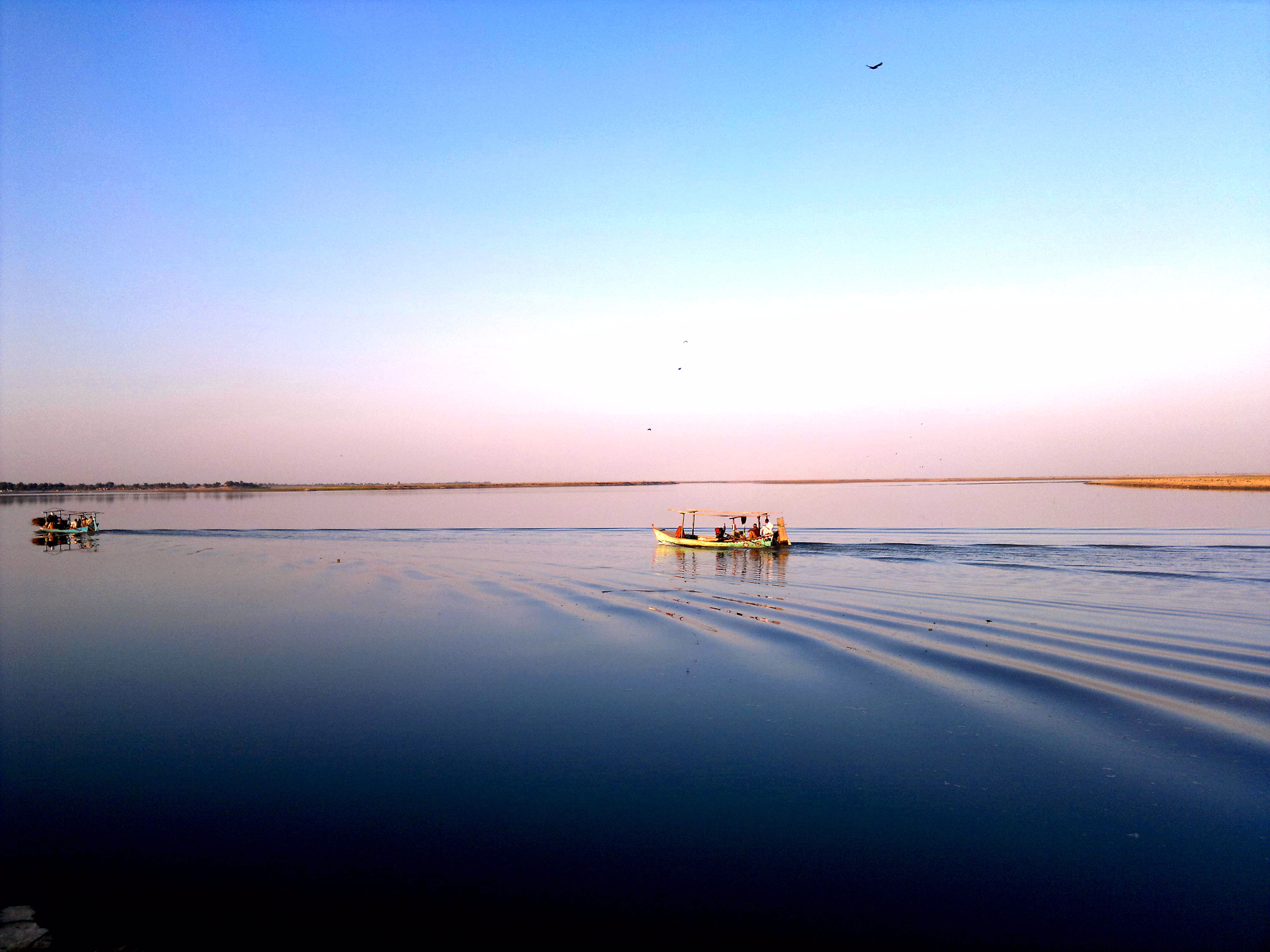
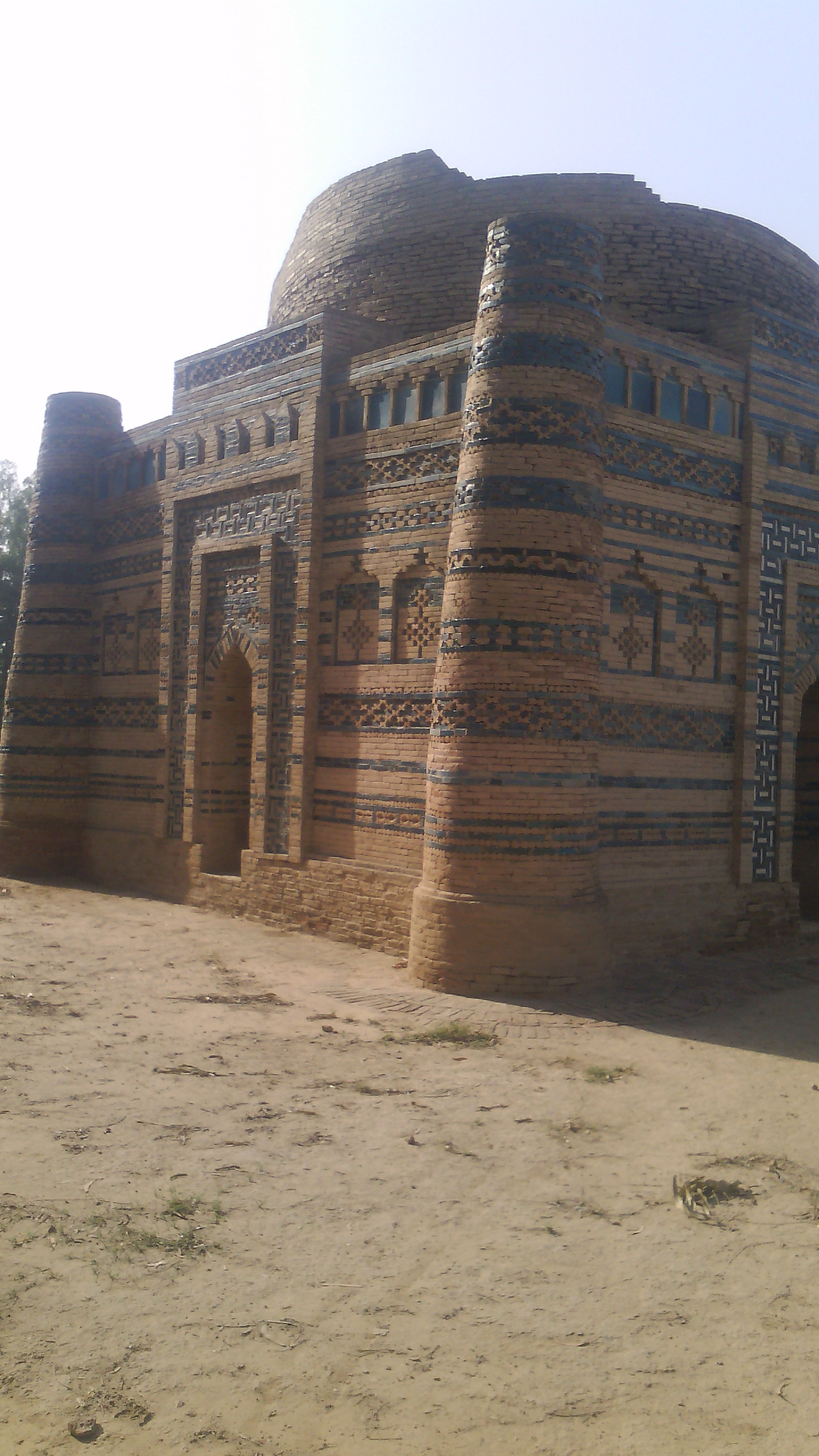
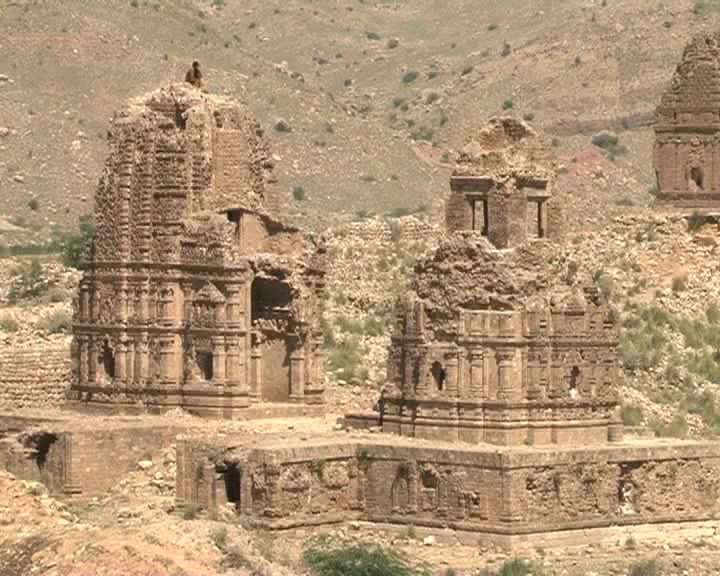
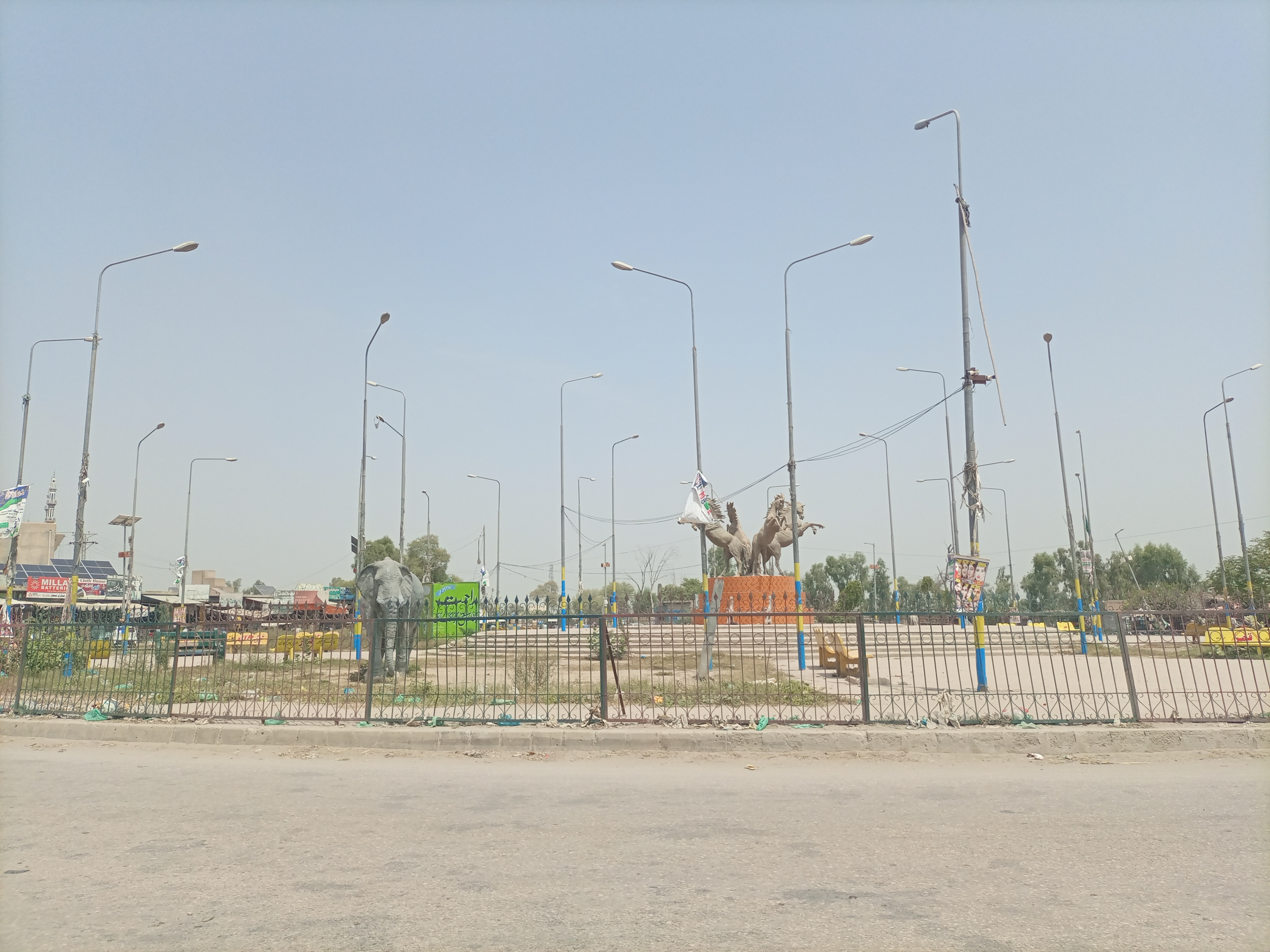
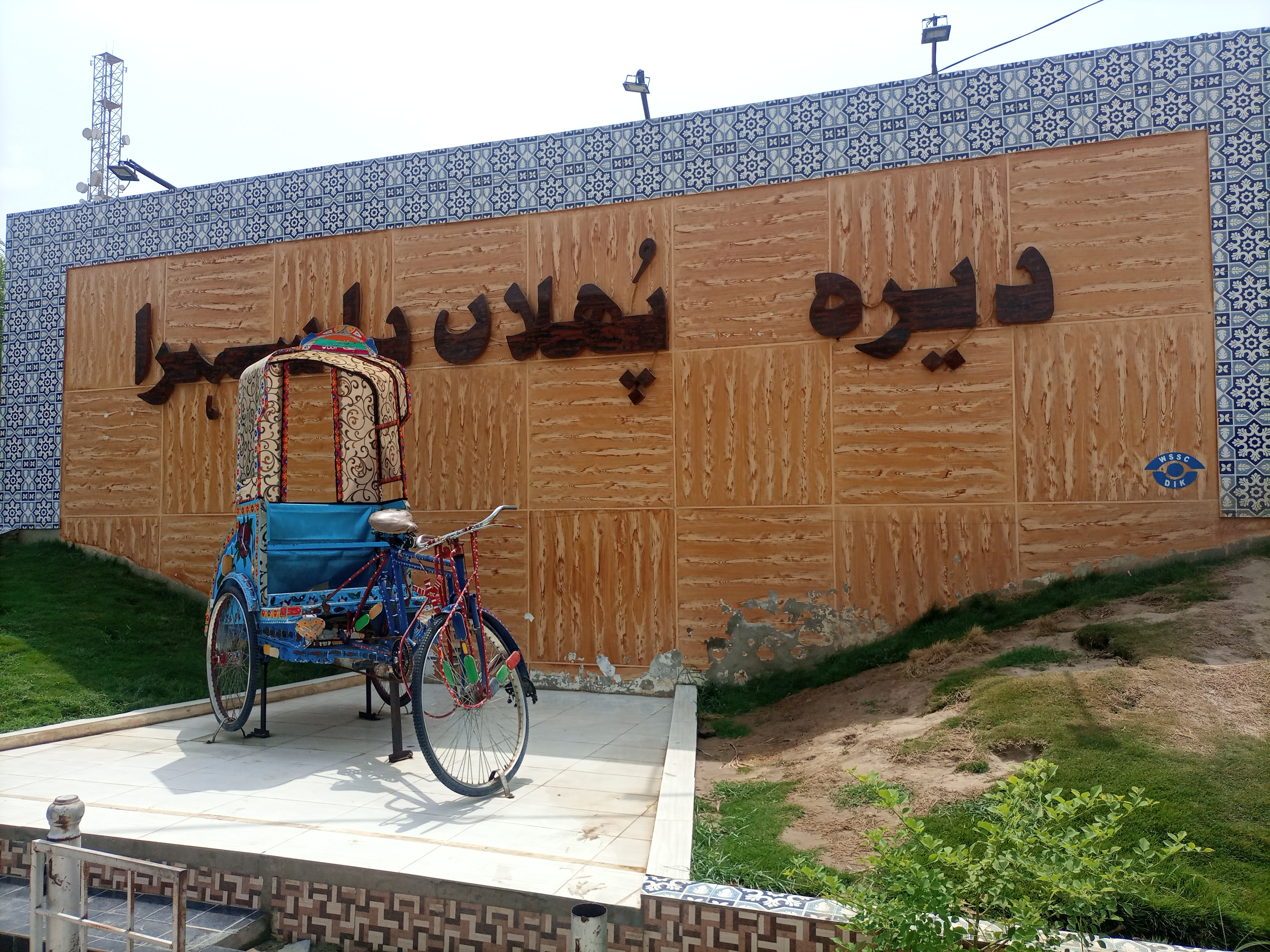
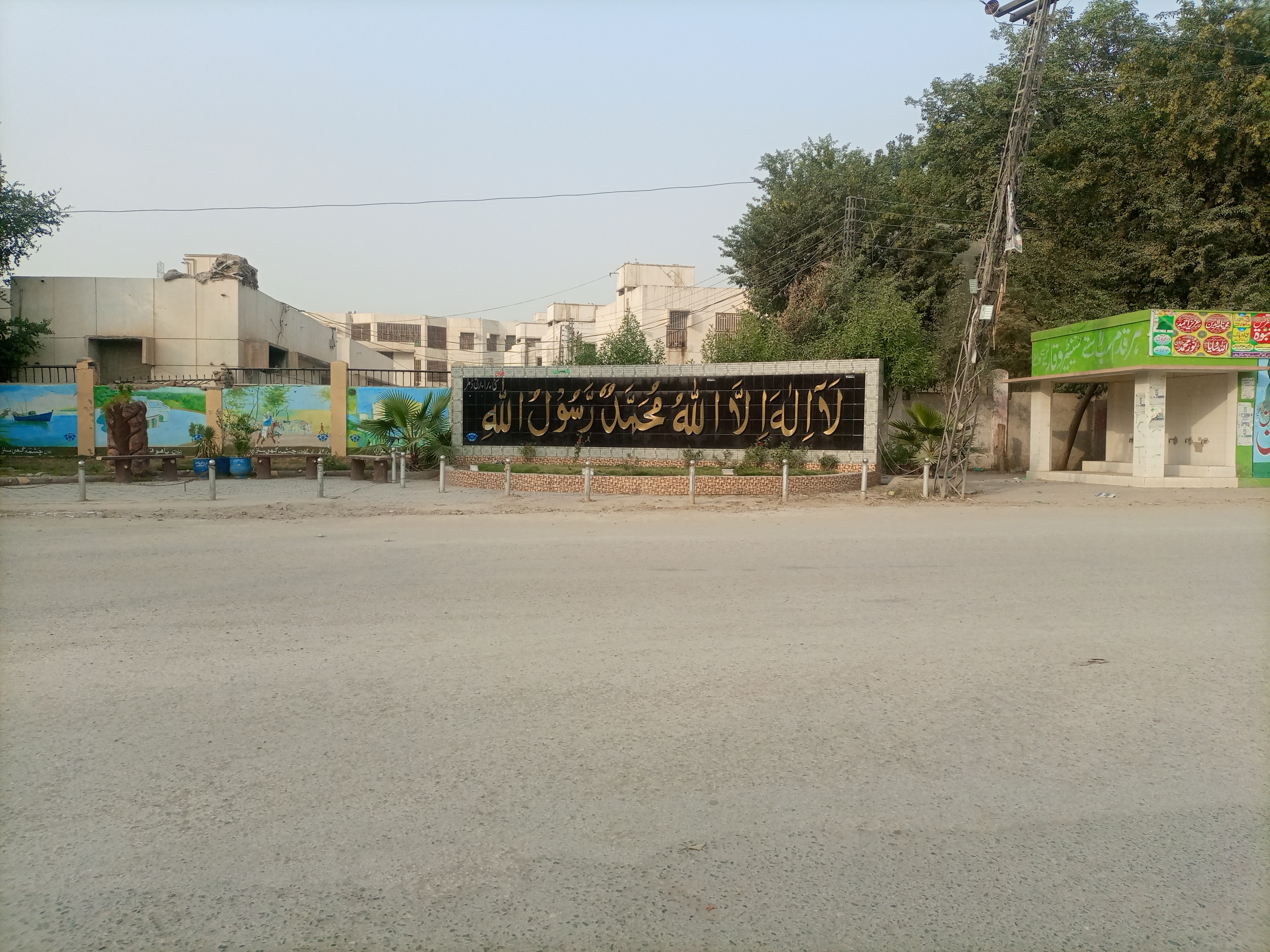
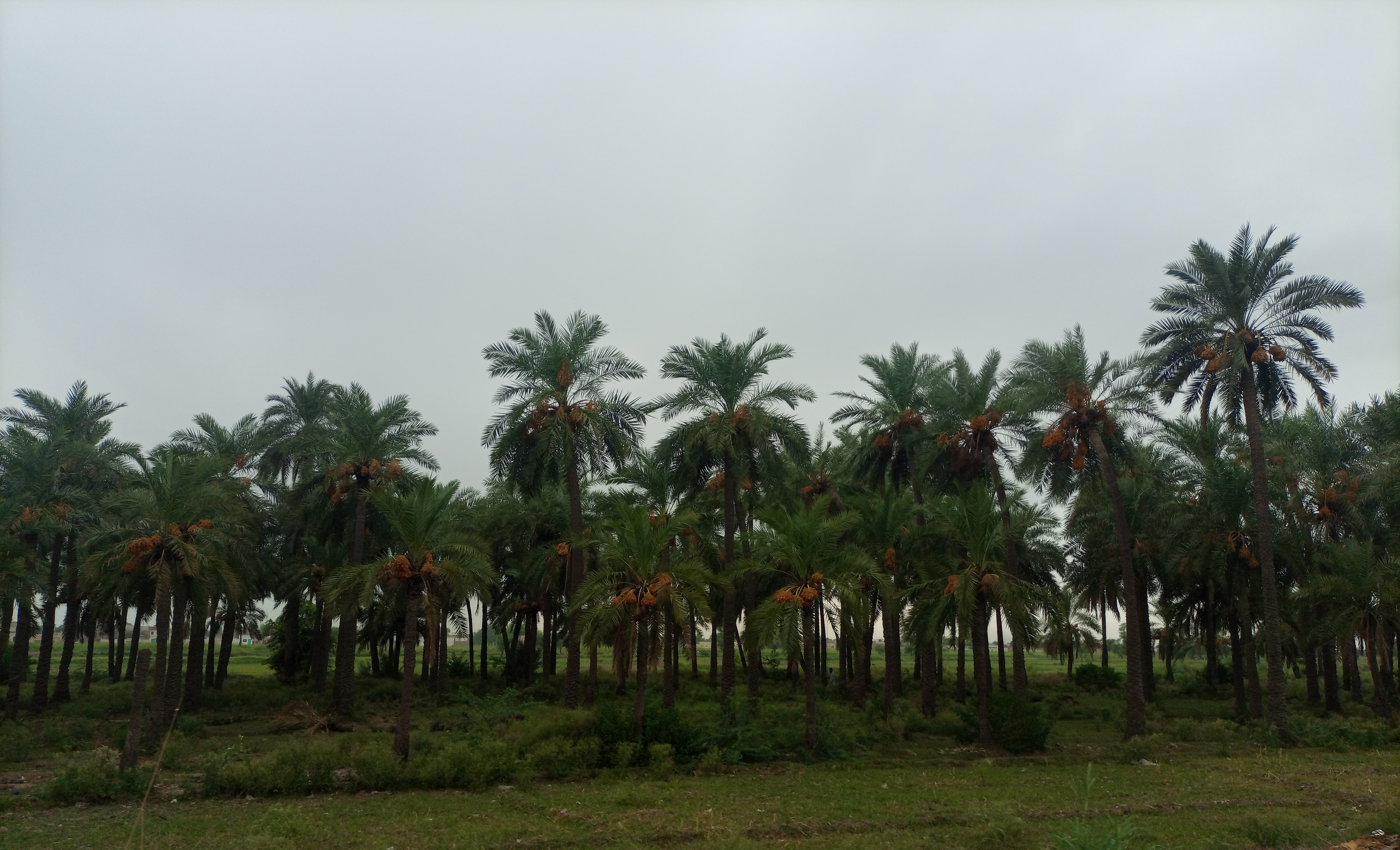
- Anticlockwise from top: Indus River, Lal Mahra Tombs, Qureshi Morr, Kalma at Kachehri Chowk, Noll Bagh, Kalma Chowk, Kafir Kot ruins, State Life Building

- Location within Khyber Pakhtunkhwa Location within Pakistan
- Coordinates: 31°49′53″N 70°54′7″E
- Country: Pakistan
- Province: Khyber Pakhtunkhwa
- District: Dera Ismail Khan
- Tehsil: Dera Ismail Khan

Government
  - Type: Mayor-council
  - Mayor: Umer Amin Gandapur (PTI)
  - Deputy Commissioner: Mansoor Arshad (BPS-18 PAS)
  - District Police Officer: Abdul Rauf Qaiserani (BPS-18 PSP)
- Elevation: 165 m (541 ft)

Population (2023)
  - Tehsil population: 763,195
  - Rank: 10th, Pakistan; 5th, Khyber Pakhtunkhwa
  - Density: 196/km^{2} (510/sq mi)
- Dera Ismail Khan Municipal Committee: 211,760; Dera Ismail Khan Cantonment: 5,697
- Time zone: UTC+05:00 (PKT)
  - Summer (DST): DST is not observed
- ZIP Code: 29111
- NWD (area code): 966
- ISO 3166 code: PK-KP
- Number of union councils: 47
- Website: dikhan.kp.gov.pk

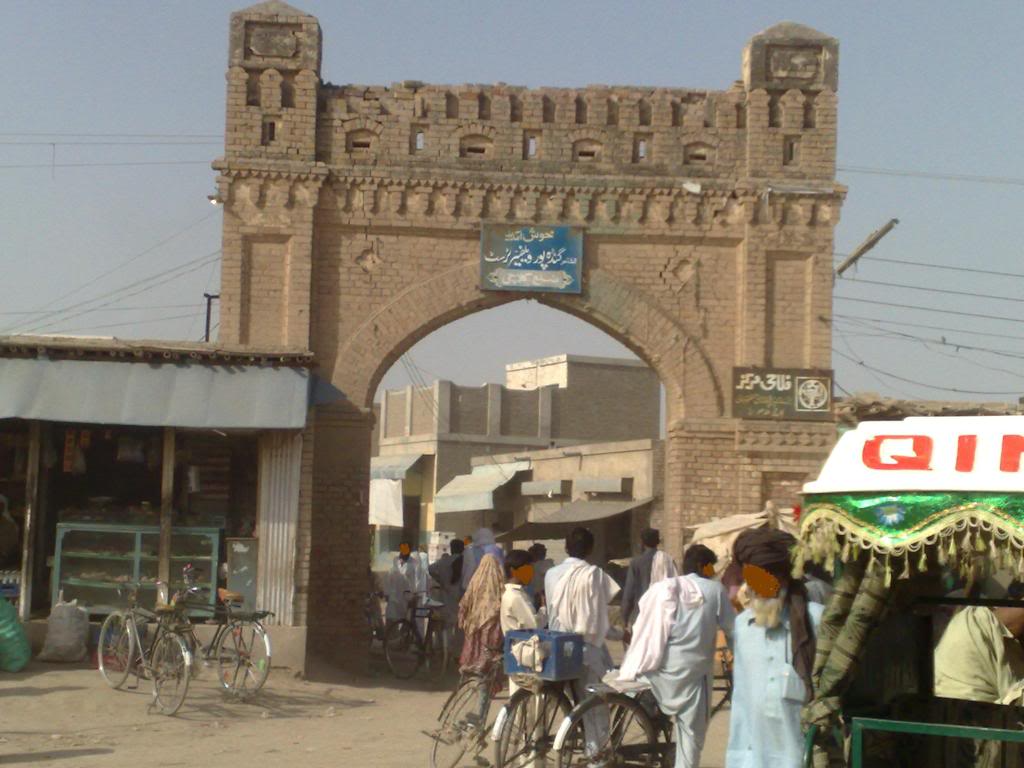
Shakhi Gate, Kulachi, District Dera Ismail Khan

Dera Ismail Khan (/deɪrʌ-ɪsmaɪ.iːl-xɑːn/; Saraiki: ڈیرہ اسماعیل خان, Pashto: ډېره اسماعيل خان), abbreviated as D.I. Khan, is a city and headquarters of Dera Ismail Khan District, located in Khyber Pakhtunkhwa, Pakistan. It is the 10th largest city of Pakistan and third or fourth largest in the province of Khyber Pakhtunkhwa by population. Dera Ismail Khan is situated on the west bank of the Indus River, at its junction with the Gomal River.

It is 300 kilometres (190 mi) south of the provincial capital Peshawar, and 230 kilometres (140 mi) northwest of Multan, Punjab.

== Etymology ==
In the Saraiki language, the word ḍerā means "tent, encampment", and is commonly found in the name of towns in the Indus Valley such as Dera Ghazi Khan and Dera Bugti. It is named after the Dodai mercenary Ismail Khan, son of Malik Sohrab Dodai, who founded the town. As such the name of the city means "Camp of Ismail Khan."

== History ==
=== Foundation ===
==== Early history ====
Map of D. I. Khan

The region around Dera Ismail Khan has been inhabited for millennia, as evidenced by the nearby site of Rehman Dheri — a pre-Harappan archaeological site dating back from 3300 BCE. In the seventh century, the city had a large population of Brahmins and Buddhists.

==== Medieval history ====
D. I. Khan is located in the historical Derajat region, which was established in the 15th century, when Baloch people were invited to settle the region by Shah Husayn, of the Langah Sultanate of Multan. The Baloch settlers were assimilated through the later waves of Pashtun settlement, although villagers along the alluvial plains are typically Baloch or Jat.

Dera Ismail Khan region was part of Multan Subah of Mughal Empire, though D. I Khan never attained a station of great power or importance before the British period. D. I. Khan grew prosperous as a trading centre for Powindah nomads, during Nader Shah's invasion of the Mughal Empire.

D. I. Khan was ruled by nine generations of Baloch leaders descended directly from Ismail Khan. The last, Nusrat Khan, was removed from power after the city was captured by Ahmad Shah Durrani in 1750. In 1794, the city was granted to Nawab Muhammad Khan Sadozai by Shahzada Kamran Durrani.

==== Re establishment of the city ====
The original town was swept away by flooding on the Indus River in 1823. The present city was founded by Nawab Sher Muhammad Khan of the Saddozai clan in 1825, and now stands four miles (6 km) away from the permanent channel of the river, atop a small plateau. Nawab Sadozai took into consideration the opinions of Diwan Lakhi Mal and Tej Bhan Nandwani for the city's reconstruction. Architects were brought in from Punjab, who designed a city where Hindus would live south of the city center and Muslims north of it.

Four bazaars were laid in each of the cardinal directions, with all four converging in the town's central Chowgalla. The rebuilt city contained a large bazaar for Afghan traders, and the city prospered from trade via the Gomal Pass. An eight foot mud wall with nine gates was built around the city during this time as well, some of which such as the Kaneran Wala and Sakki survive until today. All existing buildings date from no earlier than the 19th century.

=== Sikh rule (1821–1849) ===
Dera Ismail Khan remained under Sadozai rule from the nearby town of Mankera until it was annexed by Sikh ruler Maharaja Ranjit Singh of the Sikh Empire in 1836. Diwan Lakhi Mal appointed city's Kardar ruler, though the Nawabs of the city from the Durrani order were allowed to maintain their title and some income. The city suffered under punitive taxes that lead to frequent complaints in the Sikh Darbar at Lahore, resulting in several changes of Kardar.

=== Colonial British India era ===
D. I. Khan's first deputy commissioner under British Indian Empire was General Henry Charles Van Cortland, who arrived in February 1848, before departing later that year to quell a revolt in nearby Multan. Following the defeat of rebels at Multan, Lieutenant Butler was made the next deputy commissioner of D. I. Khan and Bannu. Under his rule, city's infrastructure and colonial administration system were established in which top posts were exclusively occupied by the British. The city was on the edge of the Tribal Areas — lands that were frequently in rebellion against British Indian Empire. The town did not rise up in revolt against British Indian Empire during the 1857 Sepoy Mutiny. In 1861, D. I. Khan was made into the Divisional Capital of the new Dera Ismail Khan Division: analogous to a British county.

The municipality was constituted in 1867, while the Dera Ismail Khan Cantonment was established in 1894. By 1881 the city's population was 22,164. The military cantonment area, which lies southeast of the town, had an area of 44 square miles (110 km^{2}), excluding the portion known as Fort Akalgarh on the northwest side.

The Dera Ismail Brigade had its winter headquarters at Dera Ismail Khan, and the garrison consisted of a mountain battery, a regiment of Native cavalry, and three regiments of Native infantry. Detachments from these regiments helped to garrison the outposts of Drazinda, Jandola, and Jatta. The "Civil Lines" neighborhood was built to the south.

The town possessed a civil hospital; its chief educational institutions were two aided Anglo-vernacular high schools, one maintained by the Church Missionary Society and the other by the Bharatri Sabha, and an Anglo-vernacular middle school maintained by the municipality.

According to the 1901 census, the population of Dera Ismail Khan was 31,737, of whom 18,662 were Muslims, 11,486 Hindus, and 1,420 Sikhs. Of the total, 3,450 lived in the cantonment.

The predominantly Muslim population (which accounted for 60% of the local population of Dera Ismail Khan) may have supported the Muslim League and the Pakistan Movement.

=== After Independence of 1947 ===
After the Partition of India and independence of Pakistan in 1947, the minority Hindus and Sikhs migrated to India, while the Muslim migrants from India settled in Dera Ismail Khan. In India, Model Town, Vijay Nagar and Derawal Nagar colony in Delhi absorbed many Hindu former residents of D. I. Khan.

Following an influx of refugees following the 1979 Soviet invasion of Afghanistan, D. I. Khan's population tripled.

During the November 2008 Dera Ismail Khan bombing, Shia religious leader Allama Nazir Hussain Shah was shot dead in a sectarian killing with Shah Iqbal Hussain. During his funeral prayers, a suicide bomber blew himself up, killing nine people and injuring 39. In the January 2009 bombings, 52 people were injured while 16 were killed as three explosions took place in the city.

In May 2009, three explosions caused the deaths of five people while nine were injured. On 14 June 2009, eight people were killed while 27 injured in an explosion in Pir Market near a bus stand. On 29 July 2009, two people were killed and four injured when a bomb planted in car detonated near the district court. On May 18, 2010, a bomb planted on a motorcycle exploded near a police van killing 13 people while injuring 14. On 25 June 2011, between 10 and 12 militants of Tehreek-i-Taliban Pakistan attacked a police station in the nearby town of Kulachi, killing 10 police officers. The Tehrik-e-Taliban Pakistan claimed the responsibility of these attacks.

In 2014, the wide-scale Operation Zarb-e-Azb was launched against militants throughout Pakistan, which resulted in a greatly improved security environment by 2016, although on January 4, 2017 15 people including five policemen were killed when a remote control planted bomb exploded on Bannu Road. On 17 February 2017, another five people, including four police officers, were killed after unidentified suspects opened fire on a police van near Mission Mor.

As part of the 2015 China-Pakistan Economic Corridor, it was announced that D. I. Khan would be the terminus of the Hakla–Dera Ismail Khan Motorway — a four-lane controlled access motorway, 280 km in length, that is to begin at the M1 near Islamabad and serve as part of the Western Alignment of the economic corridor.

On 3 November 2023, a bomb blast occurred in Dera Ismail Khan, in which a number of people were killed and injured.

On 25 January 2026, a suicide bombing took place at the home of Noor Alam Mehsud, a pro-government community leader, killing at least seven people and injuring 25, no groups claimed reasonability for the attack.

== Geography ==
=== Climate ===
Dera Ismail Khan has a hot arid climate (Köppen BWh), bordering on a hot semi-arid climate (BSh), with sweltering summers and warm winters. Rain mainly falls in two distinct periods: in the late winter and early spring from February to April, and in the monsoon from July to September.

D. I Khan is situated at an altitude of 177 metres above sea level.

Climate data for Dera Ismail Khan
| Month | Jan | Feb | Mar | Apr | May | Jun | Jul | Aug | Sep | Oct | Nov | Dec | Year |
|---|---|---|---|---|---|---|---|---|---|---|---|---|---|
| Record high °C (°F) | 28.9 (84.0) | 30.6 (87.1) | 37.2 (99.0) | 44.4 (111.9) | 47.9 (118.2) | 51.0 (123.8) | 47.0 (116.6) | 44.5 (112.1) | 42.4 (108.3) | 40.5 (104.9) | 35.0 (95.0) | 30.6 (87.1) | 51.0 (123.8) |
| Mean daily maximum °C (°F) | 20.3 (68.5) | 22.1 (71.8) | 26.9 (80.4) | 33.5 (92.3) | 38.7 (101.7) | 41.5 (106.7) | 38.5 (101.3) | 37.4 (99.3) | 36.7 (98.1) | 33.4 (92.1) | 27.7 (81.9) | 21.9 (71.4) | 31.5 (88.8) |
| Daily mean °C (°F) | 12.2 (54.0) | 14.7 (58.5) | 19.9 (67.8) | 26.0 (78.8) | 30.9 (87.6) | 34.2 (93.6) | 32.7 (90.9) | 31.9 (89.4) | 30.2 (86.4) | 25.3 (77.5) | 19.1 (66.4) | 13.6 (56.5) | 24.2 (75.6) |
| Mean daily minimum °C (°F) | 4.2 (39.6) | 7.3 (45.1) | 12.9 (55.2) | 18.5 (65.3) | 23.1 (73.6) | 26.8 (80.2) | 26.9 (80.4) | 26.4 (79.5) | 23.8 (74.8) | 17.3 (63.1) | 10.5 (50.9) | 5.3 (41.5) | 16.9 (62.4) |
| Record low °C (°F) | −2.2 (28.0) | −2.0 (28.4) | 4.0 (39.2) | 9.5 (49.1) | 14.4 (57.9) | 17.5 (63.5) | 18.6 (65.5) | 19.5 (67.1) | 15.8 (60.4) | 8.0 (46.4) | 2.2 (36.0) | −2.8 (27.0) | −2.8 (27.0) |
| Average rainfall mm (inches) | 10.0 (0.39) | 17.5 (0.69) | 34.8 (1.37) | 21.7 (0.85) | 17.2 (0.68) | 44.4 (1.75) | 69.8 (2.75) | 87.5 (3.44) | 37.6 (1.48) | 14.8 (0.58) | 2.1 (0.08) | 19.4 (0.76) | 376.8 (14.82) |
| Mean monthly sunshine hours | 222.2 | 206.8 | 234.3 | 259.2 | 290.1 | 247.7 | 241.3 | 261.1 | 271.1 | 283.2 | 249.7 | 220.4 | 2,987.1 |
Source: NOAA (1961–1990)

Climate data for Dera Ismail Khan (1991–2020)
| Month | Jan | Feb | Mar | Apr | May | Jun | Jul | Aug | Sep | Oct | Nov | Dec | Year |
|---|---|---|---|---|---|---|---|---|---|---|---|---|---|
| Record high °C (°F) | 28.9 (84.0) | 30.6 (87.1) | 37.2 (99.0) | 43.3 (109.9) | 47.9 (118.2) | 51 (124) | 47.0 (116.6) | 44.5 (112.1) | 42.4 (108.3) | 40.5 (104.9) | 35.0 (95.0) | 30.6 (87.1) | 51 (124) |
| Mean daily maximum °C (°F) | 19.5 (67.1) | 22.6 (72.7) | 27.3 (81.1) | 34.0 (93.2) | 39.6 (103.3) | 41.0 (105.8) | 38.5 (101.3) | 37.5 (99.5) | 36.5 (97.7) | 33.5 (92.3) | 27.7 (81.9) | 22.4 (72.3) | 31.7 (89.1) |
| Daily mean °C (°F) | 12.1 (53.8) | 15.3 (59.5) | 20.3 (68.5) | 26.4 (79.5) | 31.6 (88.9) | 33.4 (92.1) | 32.5 (90.5) | 31.8 (89.2) | 30.1 (86.2) | 25.7 (78.3) | 19.4 (66.9) | 14.2 (57.6) | 24.4 (75.9) |
| Mean daily minimum °C (°F) | 4.6 (40.3) | 8.0 (46.4) | 13.4 (56.1) | 18.9 (66.0) | 23.7 (74.7) | 25.9 (78.6) | 26.5 (79.7) | 26.0 (78.8) | 23.8 (74.8) | 17.9 (64.2) | 11.1 (52.0) | 5.8 (42.4) | 17.1 (62.8) |
| Record low °C (°F) | −2.2 (28.0) | −2.0 (28.4) | 4.0 (39.2) | 9.5 (49.1) | 14.4 (57.9) | 17.5 (63.5) | 18.6 (65.5) | 19.5 (67.1) | 15.8 (60.4) | 8.0 (46.4) | 2.2 (36.0) | −2.8 (27.0) | −2.8 (27.0) |
| Average precipitation mm (inches) | 12.6 (0.50) | 24.0 (0.94) | 37.4 (1.47) | 29.1 (1.15) | 9.1 (0.36) | 38.3 (1.51) | 71.5 (2.81) | 72.4 (2.85) | 37.8 (1.49) | 19.6 (0.77) | 3.4 (0.13) | 4.4 (0.17) | 369.6 (14.55) |
| Average precipitation days (≥ 1.0 mm) | 2.1 | 3.5 | 5.0 | 3.8 | 1.8 | 2.6 | 4.1 | 3.8 | 1.9 | 1.0 | 0.7 | 0.9 | 31.2 |
| Average relative humidity (%) | 62 | 58 | 62 | 51 | 42 | 46 | 63 | 69 | 63 | 58 | 63 | 64 | 58 |
| Mean monthly sunshine hours | 193.4 | 196.5 | 229.3 | 265.8 | 279.1 | 265.5 | 247.7 | 260.5 | 262.7 | 263.4 | 215.5 | 218.3 | 2,897.7 |
Source 1: NOAA (extremes 1961–1990)
Source 2: Deutscher Wetterdienst (humidity 1973–1990), Ogimet

== Demographics ==
=== Population ===
Historical population
| Year | Pop. | ±% p.a. |
|---|---|---|
| 1951 | 41,603 | — |
| 1961 | 46,140 | +1.04% |
| 1972 | 58,778 | +2.23% |
| 1981 | 68,145 | +1.66% |
| 1998 | 92,114 | +1.79% |
| 2017 | 217,457 | +4.62% |
| 2023 | 220,575 | +0.24% |

According to 2023 census, Saraiki people are the main ethnic group in Dera Ismail Khan District and city in simple majority. The total urban population of Dera Ismail Khan Tehsil is 217,455, consisting of 114,856 males and 102,465 females, as of 2023.

Languages of Dera Ismail Khan Tehsil (urban) (2023 Pakistani census)
1. Saraiki (72.8%)
2. Pashto (15.7%)
3. Urdu (9.56%)
4. Punjabi (1.56%)
5. Others (0.37%)
Languages of Dera Ismail Khan District (1881 Indian census)
1. Punjabi (63.0%)
2. Jatki (20.6%)
3. Pashto (15.4%)
4. Other (0.97%)

There are 158,342 Saraiki, 34,142 Pashto, 20,784 Urdu, 3,387 Punjabi, 164 Sindhi, 86 Balochi, 88 Kashmiri, 167 Hindko, 3 Brahui, 13 Shina, 2 Balti, 2 Kalasha and 175 other language speakers, out of a total of 217,455.

Religious groups in Dera Ismail Khan City (1881−2017) (Note: 1881-1941: Data for the entirety of the town of Dera Ismail Khan, which included Dera Ismail Khan Municipality and Dera Ismail Khan Cantonment.)
| Religious group | 1881 | | 1891 | | 1901 | | 1911 | | 1921 | | 1931 | | 1941 | | 2017 | |
| Religious group | Pop. | % | Pop. | % | Pop. | % | Pop. | % | Pop. | % | Pop. | % | Pop. | % | Pop. | % |
|---|---|---|---|---|---|---|---|---|---|---|---|---|---|---|---|---|
| Islam | 12,440 | 56.13% | 15,195 | 56.52% | 18,662 | 58.8% | 21,759 | 61.94% | 21,056 | 53.52% | 22,321 | 55.34% | 26,424 | 51.5% | 215,348 | 98.78% |
| Hinduism (Note: 1931-1941: Including Ad-Dharmis) | 8,862 | 39.98% | 10,483 | 38.99% | 11,486 | 36.19% | 11,716 | 33.35% | 17,077 | 43.41% | 16,761 | 41.56% | 22,815 | 44.47% | 438 | 0.2% |
| Sikhism | 680 | 3.07% | 1,093 | 4.07% | 1,420 | 4.47% | 1,331 | 3.79% | 724 | 1.84% | 708 | 1.76% | 1,412 | 2.75% | —N/a | —N/a |
| Jainism | 2 | 0.01% | 0 | 0% | 15 | 0.05% | 0 | 0% | 0 | 0% | 0 | 0% | —N/a | —N/a | —N/a | —N/a |
| Christianity | —N/a | —N/a | 112 | 0.42% | 154 | 0.49% | 325 | 0.93% | 484 | 1.23% | 541 | 1.34% | 195 | 0.38% | 2,166 | 0.99% |
| Zoroastrianism | —N/a | —N/a | 1 | 0% | 0 | 0% | 0 | 0% | 0 | 0% | 0 | 0% | 0 | 0% | —N/a | —N/a |
| Judaism | —N/a | —N/a | 0 | 0% | 0 | 0% | 0 | 0% | 0 | 0% | 0 | 0% | 1 | 0% | —N/a | —N/a |
| Buddhism | —N/a | —N/a | —N/a | —N/a | 0 | 0% | 0 | 0% | 0 | 0% | 0 | 0% | —N/a | —N/a | —N/a | —N/a |
| Ahmadiyya | —N/a | —N/a | —N/a | —N/a | —N/a | —N/a | —N/a | —N/a | —N/a | —N/a | —N/a | —N/a | —N/a | —N/a | 32 | 0.01% |
| Others | 180 | 0.81% | 0 | 0% | 0 | 0% | 0 | 0% | 0 | 0% | 0 | 0% | 459 | 0.89% | 34 | 0.02% |
| Total population | 22,164 | 100% | 26,884 | 100% | 31,737 | 100% | 35,131 | 100% | 39,341 | 100% | 40,331 | 100% | 51,306 | 100% | 218,018 | 100% |

== Transportation ==
=== Road ===
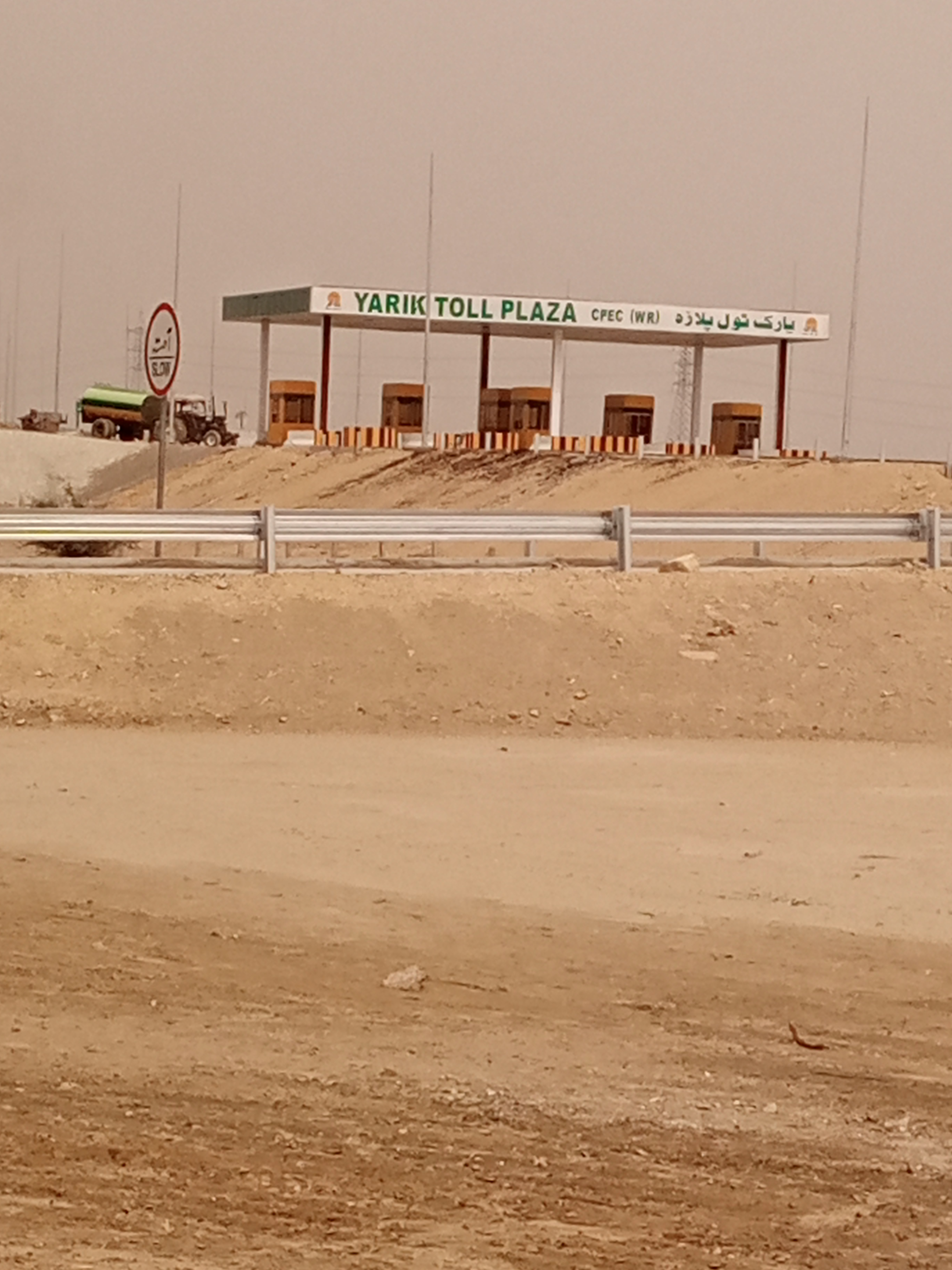
Yarik Toll Plaza of Islamabad-Dera Ismail Khan Motorway that serves as south terminal of the motorway

The city is connected to Bannu via the highway, which further connects it to the provincial capital of Peshawar via Kohat and Darra Adam Khel. Another road connects D. I. Khan to Mianwali through Chashma Barrage, and another connects the city to Zhob. The third major road connects it to Bhakkar in Punjab, situated on the eastern bank of the Indus River. A bridge on the Indus River was constructed in the early 1980s, before which the approach to Bhakkar was made through a boat bridge. Another road connect it to district Tank which further leads towards Jandola-AngoorAdda areas of South South Waziristan district at North west and Pezu on eastern side.

D. I. Khan is at the terminus of the Hakla–Dera Ismail Khan Motorway — a 280-km, four-lane controlled access motorway that is to extend from the Hakla Interchange on the M1 Motorway, near Islamabad to D. I. Khan.

=== Air ===
The city is served by Dera Ismail Khan Airport, though no commercial flights operate to the airport.

== See also ==
- Dinpur
- Basti Tarkhananwali
- Kafir Kot
- Dera Ghazi Khan
