= Paroom Tehsil =

Pakistani administrative area

Paroom Tehsil Balochi: تحصیل پاروم Jaheen Parome
- Tehsil of Panjgur District
- Location within Balochistan, Pakistan Location within Pakistan
- Coordinates: 26°34′1″N 63°23′5″E
- Country: Pakistan
- Province: Balochistan
- District: Panjgur District
- Tehsil: Paroom

Area
  - Tehsil of Panjgur District: 3,378 km^{2} (1,304 sq mi)
- Elevation: 900 m (3,000 ft)

Population (2023)
  - Tehsil of Panjgur District: 31,113
  - Density: 9.21/km^{2} (23.9/sq mi)
  - Urban: 0
  - Rural: 31,113 (100%)

Literacy
  - Literacy rate: Total: (38.64%); Male: (42.62%); Female: (34.41%)
- Time zone: UTC+5 (PST)
- Main languages: 30,941 Balochi, 82 Kashmiri, 35 Saraiki

Paroom tehsil, also spelled Parom, shortened form of Jaheen Parome is a tehsil in Panjgur District, southwestern Balochistan, Pakistan. Nestled in the Makran region, it lies approximately 70 kilometres (43 mi) northeast of Turbat and 65 kilometres (40 mi) southwest of Chitkan, the district headquarters. The tehsil occupies the southwestern part of the district along the border with Sistan and Baluchestan province of Iran. The town of Paroom serves as the tehsil headquarters.

== Geography ==
The tehsil covers 3,378 square kilometres (1,304 sq mi), positioned in the western parts of Panjgur District along the international Iran–Pakistan border, the 909 kilometres (565 mi) boundary drawn between British India and Persia in the late nineteenth century. To the south it reaches Zamoran, Buleda, Turbat Tehsil of Kech District, to the east it borders Gowargo Tehsil, and to the north Gichk Tehsil. Its terrain is largely arid and mountainous, with elevations generally above 900 metres (3,000 ft) and peaks exceeding 1,300 metres (4,300 ft).

As a consequence of the colonial-era demarcation, the historical Paroom region was divided, and a small portion of its traditional territory falls within present-day Iran.

== Population ==
As per the 2023 national census, Paroom Tehsil has a population of 31,113, all of whom reside in rural areas. There are 6,504 households, all in rural settings.

The overall literacy rate is 38.64%, including 42.62% among males and 34.41% among females, pointing to persistent educational disparities, particularly for women.

=== Languages ===
Languages of Paroom tehsil (2023)
1. Balochi (99.5%)
2. Others (0.52%)

Balochi is the overwhelmingly dominant language in Paroom Tehsil, accounting for approximately 99.48% of the population. Other languages reported include Kashmiri (82 speakers, ~0.26%) and Saraiki (35 speakers, ~0.11%).

=== Notable localities ===
Historical villages within the Paroom tehsil include Diz, site of the area's main historical fort, whose name itself means "fort" in Balochi, Dasht Shahbaz, Jayeen, Legoork, Sengozai Bazar, and Gwash, among others. The area has several small dambs along the Dambani Kaur, a dry river that once fed the Parom-e-Kup (Lake Parom) during rainfall; two larger archaeological sites resembling Neolithic dambs were demolished in 2008 for agricultural use. Paroom and Koh Bun are the tehsil's two union councils.

== Climate ==
Paroom has a dry, arid climate characterised by relatively moderate temperature variations. Unlike much of the Makran division, it enjoys comparatively mild and pleasant summers, while winters can be cool to cold. Precipitation is limited and occurs mainly in two periods: from February to April and during the early monsoon months of June and July.

== Economy ==
Agriculture and livestock rearing are the main occupation of Paroom's population. The region is capable of producing multiple crops per year, and its date palms, particularly the Mazafti or Muzati variety, are highly regarded well beyond domestic markets. Cross-border trade with Iran forms a significant part of the local economy. With goods such as petrol, diesel, gas, tiles, tyres, and daily-use commodities flowing in from the west, while mangoes and other fruits are among the exports. The border area supports petrol pumps, shops, and hotels. Formal employment generated by the Pakistani state remains limited.

== History ==
No formal written record of pre-colonial Paroom survives; oral histories and traditional ballads serve as the primary sources for this period. These accounts depict the area as a prosperous and strategically significant passage point: nearly all major trade routes connecting Afghanistan, Nushki, and Kharan to the coastal ports of Gwadar, Jiwani, and Iranian Chabahar passed through Paroom, making control of the region a source of considerable local power.

Historical governance of Paroom is associated with two ruling families: the Durrazai clan of Dizzak (now in Iranian territory) and the Sanjarzai family, who maintained their fort in the upper reaches of the area. Both were periodically allied with the Shambezai ruling family based at Diz. Paroom's ballads record several episodes of resistance against outside powers, including a confrontation led by the chieftain Khoda Murad against Damani tribes from Sistan who had raided a trade caravan, and a later battle at Sorcheel in the final decade of the seventeenth century, in which the Nosherwani sardar Abdullah was killed by Khoda Kamalan, brother of Khoda Murad, during an attempt to subjugate the region.

=== The Goldsmid line and British influence ===
Major Frederic John Goldsmid visited the Panjgur region in 1861 as part of a British effort to demarcate western Balochistan and assess its suitability for a telegraph line. By 1863, an Assistant Political Agent had been appointed in Gwadar with oversight over the Panjgur area, and British administrative influence deepened progressively through the latter decades of the nineteenth century.

The ruling family of Paroom did not mount armed resistance to British encroachment, instead attempting to preserve a degree of local sovereignty through negotiation, a pragmatic accommodation that allowed some continuity of local governance even as the broader region was absorbed into British India's administrative framework.

The Goldsmid Line, formalised as the Perso-Baloch boundary, bisected the historical Paroom region, separating communities with shared tribal, linguistic, and kinship ties across what became an international frontier. The consequences of this division continue to shape local life, with cross-border movement and trade remaining a defining feature of the area's economy and social fabric.

=== Post-Independence ===
Following the Partition of British India and the Independence of Pakistan in 1947, the Makran region, including Panjgur and its tehsils, was integrated into the new state. The broader district was formally notified as a separate administrative unit on 1 July 1977, when Makran Division was carved out of the former Makran District.

== Tribal composition ==
Paroom is home to several distinct tribes and clans. Among the principal groups are the Barh (also present in Buleda, Dasht, and parts of Iran), the Shambezai (found also in Turbat, Zamuran, and Iran), the Sanjarzai (now known as Sanjarani, spread across Balochistan, Punjab, Sindh, and Afghanistan), the Raisi (also in Turbat and Zamuran), and the Moradzai (present across Panjgur District, Kech, and eastern Iran).
