= Makran (disambiguation) =

Makran is the southern coastal region of Balochistan in West and South Asia.

Makran can also refer to:

== Places ==
- Makran, Iran; a village in Goharbaran-e Jonubi Rural District of Goharbaran District, Miandorud County, Mazandaran Province
- Makuran Division, Pakistan; an administrative division of Balochistan Province
- Makran (princely state), former princely state in a subsidiary alliance with British India

== Other uses ==
- IRIS Makran, forward base ship of the Islamic Republic of Iran Navy
- Makran IFV, Iranian Infantry Fighting Vehicle

== See also ==
- Makrani (disambiguation)
- Makran Trench, subduction zone along the northeastern margin of the Gulf of Oman
- Makran Coastal Range, mountain range in the Makran region
- Makran Coastal Highway (N-10), national highway in Pakistan
- Gulf of Makran, alternative name for the Gulf of Oman
