= PB-30 Panjgur-II =

Constituency of the Provincial Assembly of Balochistan, Pakistan

- Constituency for the Provincial Assembly of Balochistan
- Region: Gichk Tehsil, Paroom Tehsil and Panjgur Tehsil (partly) of Panjgur District

Current constituency
- Member: vacant
- Created from: PB-43 Panjgur-II

PB-30 Panjgur-II (پی بی-30 پنجگور-2) is a constituency of the Provincial Assembly of Balochistan.

== General elections 2024 ==
Provincial election 2024: PB-30 Panjgur-II
Party	Candidate	Votes	%	±%
NP	Rahmat Saleh Baloch	9,876	49.48	
BNP (A)	Shakeel Ahmed	8,521	42.69	
Others	Others (seven candidates)	1,563	7.83	
Turnout		20,588	30.86	
Total valid votes		19,960	96.95	
Rejected ballots		628	3.05	
Majority		1,355	6.79	
Registered electors		66,712		

== See also ==
- PB-29 Panjgur-I
- PB-31 Washuk
