= Gichk Tehsil =

Pakistani administrative area

Gichk Tehsil Balochi: تحصیل گچک Gichak
- Sub-Tehsil of Panjgur District
- Location within Balochistan, Pakistan Location within Pakistan
- Coordinates: 26°40′N 64°31′E
- Country: Pakistan
- Province: Balochistan
- District: Panjgur District

Area
  - Sub-Tehsil of Panjgur District: 8,387 km^{2} (3,238 sq mi)

Population (2023)
  - Sub-Tehsil of Panjgur District: 33,578
  - Density: 4/km^{2} (10/sq mi)
  - Urban: 0 (0%)
  - Rural: 33,578 (100%)

Literacy
  - Literacy rate: Total: (20.15%); Male: (21.68%); Female: (17.50%)
- Time zone: UTC+5 (PST)
- Main languages: 33,427 Balochi 151 Others

Gichk Tehsil (also spelled Gichak) is an administrative subdivision (sub-tehsil) of Panjgur District in southwestern Balochistan, Pakistan. It lies in the northern part of the district and takes its name from the Gichki tribe, which historically dominated the Panjgur and broader Makran region. The town of Gichk, 40 kilometres (25 mi) southeast of the district headquarters in Chitkan, serves as the sub-tehsil headquarters.

== Geography ==
Gichk Tehsil occupies the northern part of Panjgur District it borders Paroom Tehsil to the southwest, Gowargo Tehsil to the south, and separates them from Panjgur Tehsil to the north. It borders several other tehsils of Awaran District to the east and Washuk District to the north. The terrain is arid and mountainous, dominated by the Siahan Range to the north. The River Tank, the district's second principal waterway, flows through or near the sub-tehsil, with the Gichki and Raghai streams among its tributaries.

== Population ==
As per the 2023 Pakistani census, Gichk sub-tehsil has a population of 33,578, all of whom reside in rural areas. There are 15,638 households, all in rural settings.

The overall literacy rate is 20.15%, including 21.68% among males and 17.50% among females.

=== Languages ===
Languages of Gichk sub-tehsil (2023)
1. Balochi (99.7%)
2. Others (0.30%)

Balochi is the overwhelmingly dominant language in Gichk, as it is throughout Panjgur District, where approximately 99.7% of the district's total population speak Balochi as their mother tongue.

== Economy ==
Agriculture and livestock rearing form the basis of the local economy, as in the broader Panjgur District. Land in Gichk is either rain-fed (khushkaba) or flood-irrigated (sailaba), with irrigated areas mainly used for fruit cultivation. Wheat, jowar, barley, and rice are cultivated on unirrigated land. Date palms are an important crop, as they are throughout the district. Formal employment generated by the Pakistani state remains limited.

== History ==
The name Gichk is directly associated with the Gichki tribe, who gave their name to the valley and sub-tehsil they dominate. The Gichki, initially settled in the Gichk valley of Panjgur, rose to become the ruling class of the state of Makran from approximately 1740 until 1955. Their origins are debated; the most widely cited account describes them as Rajput migrants who arrived in Makran between the fifteenth and seventeenth centuries, gradually converting to Islam and establishing themselves through diplomacy and strategic alliances with local ruling families.

The Gichki were initially followers of the Zikri sect, a heterodox Muslim movement with a strong presence in Makran. Their association with the Zikris brought them into conflict with the Khan of Kalat, Mir Nasir Khan I, who undertook a series of military campaigns against the region between 1749 and 1794, primarily directed at suppressing the Zikri faith. Despite these pressures, the Gichki retained their hold over Panjgur, eventually converting to Sunni Islam while maintaining their political dominance.

=== British influence and post-Independence ===
Major Frederic John Goldsmid visited Panjgur in 1861 as part of British efforts to demarcate western Balochistan, and by 1863 an Assistant Political Agent had been appointed in Gwadar with oversight over the broader district. Panjgur, including Gichk, remained under the nominal authority of the Khan of Kalat throughout the colonial era, with the British exercising indirect influence.

Following the Partition of British India and the Independence of Pakistan in 1947, the Makran region was integrated into the new state. The broader district was formally notified as a separate administrative unit on 1 July 1977, when Makran Division was carved out of the former Makran District.
