= Gichk =

Town in Balochistan, Pakistan

Gichk Balochi: گچک
- Town
- Location within Balochistan, Pakistan Location within Pakistan
- Country: Pakistan
- Province: Balochistan
- District: Panjgur
- Sub-Tehsil: Gichk
- Elevation: 1,194 m (3,917 ft)
- Time zone: UTC+5 (PST)

Gichk (Balochi: گچک) is a town in Panjgur District, Balochistan province of Pakistan, situated at an elevation of approximately 1,194 metres above sea level. It serves as the headquarters of Gichk Tehsil, a sub-tehsil in the northeastern part of the district, lying approximately 40 kilometres (25 mi) southeast of Panjgur, the district headquarters.

The town takes its name from the Gichki tribe, who settled in the Gichk valley and rose to become the ruling class of the state of Makran from approximately 1740 until 1955. The Gichki are widely regarded as Rajput migrants who arrived in Makran between the fifteenth and seventeenth centuries, gradually converting to Islam and consolidating power through strategic alliances with local ruling families.

The surrounding sub-tehsil is predominantly rural and sparsely populated, with an economy based on agriculture, livestock rearing, and date palm cultivation. The terrain is arid and mountainous, dominated by the Siahan Range to the north, and the River Tank, flows in the vicinity, fed by the Gichki and Raghai streams among its tributaries.
