= Sultanate of Makran =

The Sultanate of Makran was a regional state in the Makran region, with its capital at Kech, from 12th to early 17th centuries. Emerging after the disintegration of Ghaznavid and Ghurid dynasties, it was ruled by the 'Malik dynasty'. It was succeeded by the Buledi tribe in 17th century, which in turn was driven out by the Gichki in the next century. The last rulers of dynasty were followers of Zikrism.

== History ==
The sultanate was established by Malik Hasan in the early 12th century. According to the historian Nabi Bakhsh Baloch, he was a sayyid, and hence his authority was accepted by the Baloch of Makran; the dynasty has also been suggested to be of Arab, Jat and Hoth Baloch origin.

Malik Hasan was succeeded by his son Abu'l Makarim Khasrau Shah. His sons, Taj al-Din and Nusrat al-Din, ruled jointly and took the title of sultan, probably after the death of Muhammad of Ghor in 1206. In Tabaqat-i Nasiri, Taj al-Din has been referred to as malik on the behalf of Ghurid sultans. A panegyric for Nusrat al-Din was composed by Siraj al-Din Siraji of Khurasan in 1212. Besides Nusrat, Siraji named a number of members of dynasty and other dignitaries of Makran of the time. Another poet, Badi' al-Din Taki of Sistan, was also attached to their court.

With Baloch tribes forming their army, the sultanate successfully defeated Oghuz invasions. According to Marco Polo, Kech Makran was an independent kingdom towards the end of 13th century, whose most of population was Muslim with a minority of Idolators.

According to Baloch traditions, Chakar Rind appointed Malik Sa'id, a descendant of Malik Hasan, as ruler of Makran in late 15th century after conquering the region, but he became independent after the Baloch confederation weakened in the 16th century and Chakar was forced to migrate towards Punjab.

The Ottoman admiral Seydi Ali Reis named Malik Jalal al-Din, son of Malik Dinar as ruler of Kech Makran in his Mirat ul Memalik when visited Gwadar before 1557. One of last Malik rulers, Farrukh Jahangir was a disciple of Muhammad Jaunpuri and followed Zikrism. In 1613, Ganj Ali Khan, the Safavid governor of Kerman undertook campaign against Makran and Malik Shams al-Din of Makran was taken prisoner by him. The last king, Malik Mirza started prosecution of the Zikri sect and was overthrown by the Zikri tribes of Buledi and Gichki in the 17th century.

== Economy and society ==
The sultanate comprised Makran and Qusdar. People celebrated Eid and Nowruz; wine was not consumed but earlier Kharijite tendencies of Ma'danid dynasty were reduced. With Kech being located near to Arabian Sea, it participated in the maritime trade, with Makrani merchants reaching as far as Java and Sumatra.
