= PB-29 Panjgur-I =

Constituency of the Provincial Assembly of Balochistan, Pakistan

- Constituency for the Provincial Assembly of Balochistan
- Region: Kalag Sub-Tehsil, Panjgur Tehsil (partly) including Panjgur city of Panjgur District

Current constituency
- Party: Balochistan National Party (Awami)
- Member: Mir Asadullah Baloch
- Created from: PB-42 Panjgur-I

PB-29 Panjgur-I (پی بی-29 پنجگور-1) is a constituency of the Provincial Assembly of Balochistan.

== General elections 2024 ==
Provincial election 2024: PB-29 Panjgur-I
Party	Candidate	Votes	%	±%
BNP (A)	Mir Asadullah Baloch	7,375	47.19	
NP	Haji Mohammad Aslam	4,555	29.14	
JUI (F)	Atta Ullah Baloch	2,659	17.01	
Others	Others (eight candidates)	1,041	6.66	
Turnout		16,266	28.99	
Total valid votes		15,630	96.09	
Rejected ballots		636	3.91	
Majority		2,820	18.05	
Registered electors		56,131		

== See also ==
- PB-28 Kech-IV
- PB-30 Panjgur-II
