= Makran Coastal Range =

Mountain range in Balochistan, Pakistan

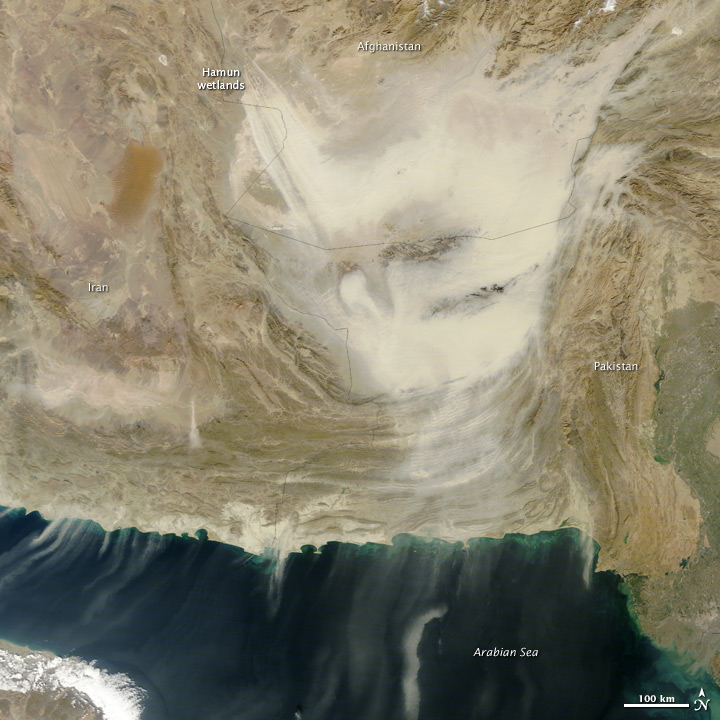
Afghanistan dust storm hemmed in by the Makran Coastal Range, Central Makran Range, and Sulaiman Ranges in Pakistan.

Makran Coastal Range is a mountain range in the Makran region, in southwestern section of Balochistan Province, in southwestern Pakistan. It is one of three mountain ranges system in the province. The range rises to around 1,500 metres (4,900 ft) in elevation.

It is the southernmost part of the Makrān Range, in the Makran Division, that lies on the coast.

Geology

The Makran Coastal Range is primarily made up of limestone and sandstone. It was formed when the northwestern Indian Plate collided with the Asian Plate.

== Adjacent ranges ==
There are three main ranges in Balochistan:

- the Makran Coastal Range (up to about 1,500 metres (4,900 ft));
- the Central Makran Range (2,000–3,000 metres (6,600–9,800 ft));
- the Siahan Range (1,000–2,000 metres (3,300–6,600 ft)).

== See also ==
- Chabahar
- Gwadar
- Khor Kalmat
- Lyari Town
- Makran Coastal Highway
- Makran Coastal Range
- Makran Division
- N'aschi
- Sokhta Koh
- State of Makran
- Wildlife of Western Pakistan
- 1945 Balochistan earthquake
