= Date palm farming in Pakistan =

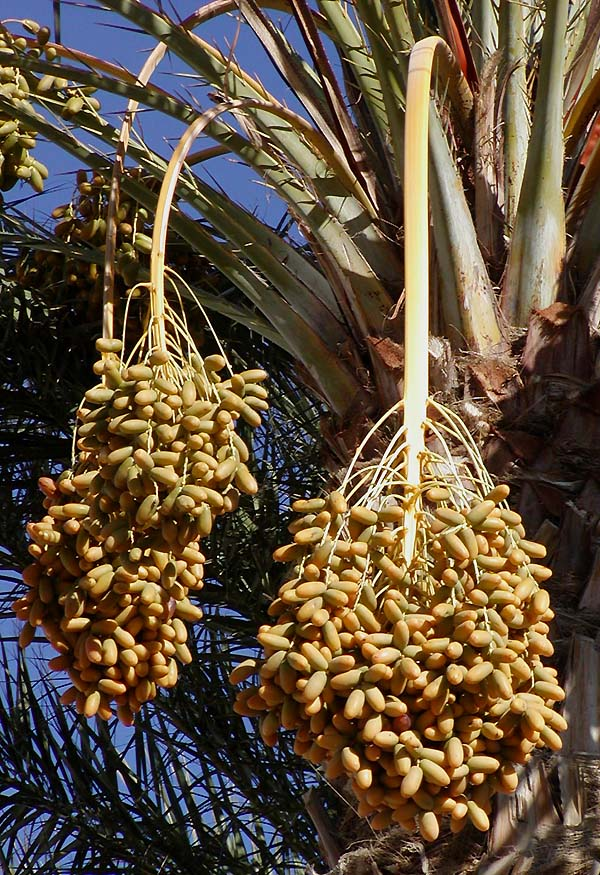
Dates growing on a date palm.

Pakistan is the 5th-largest producer of dates in the world.

== Production ==
Pakistan is one of biggest producers and exporters of dates in the world, annually producing 535,000 tons according to the Trade Development Authority.

The main regions for date cultivation are the Khairpur district in Sindh and the Panjgur District in Balochistan.

== Varieties ==
There are more than 160 varieties of dates palm in the Pakistan, among them the popular varieties are:

- Aseel of Khairpur,
- Dhakki of D.I. Khan
- Begum Jangi of Makran.

== Panjgur date processing plant ==
A date processing plant in Panjgur began production in 2022 with United Arab Emirates assistance funded by the Abu Dhabi Fund for Development (ADFD) at a cost of $6.36 million. The project area is 5,710 square metres, and produces over 32,000 tonnes per day.
