= Makuran Division =

Administrative division of Balochistan, Pakistan

Coordinates: 26°00′N 63°30′E

Makuran Division تقسیم مکران مکران ڈویژن
- Division
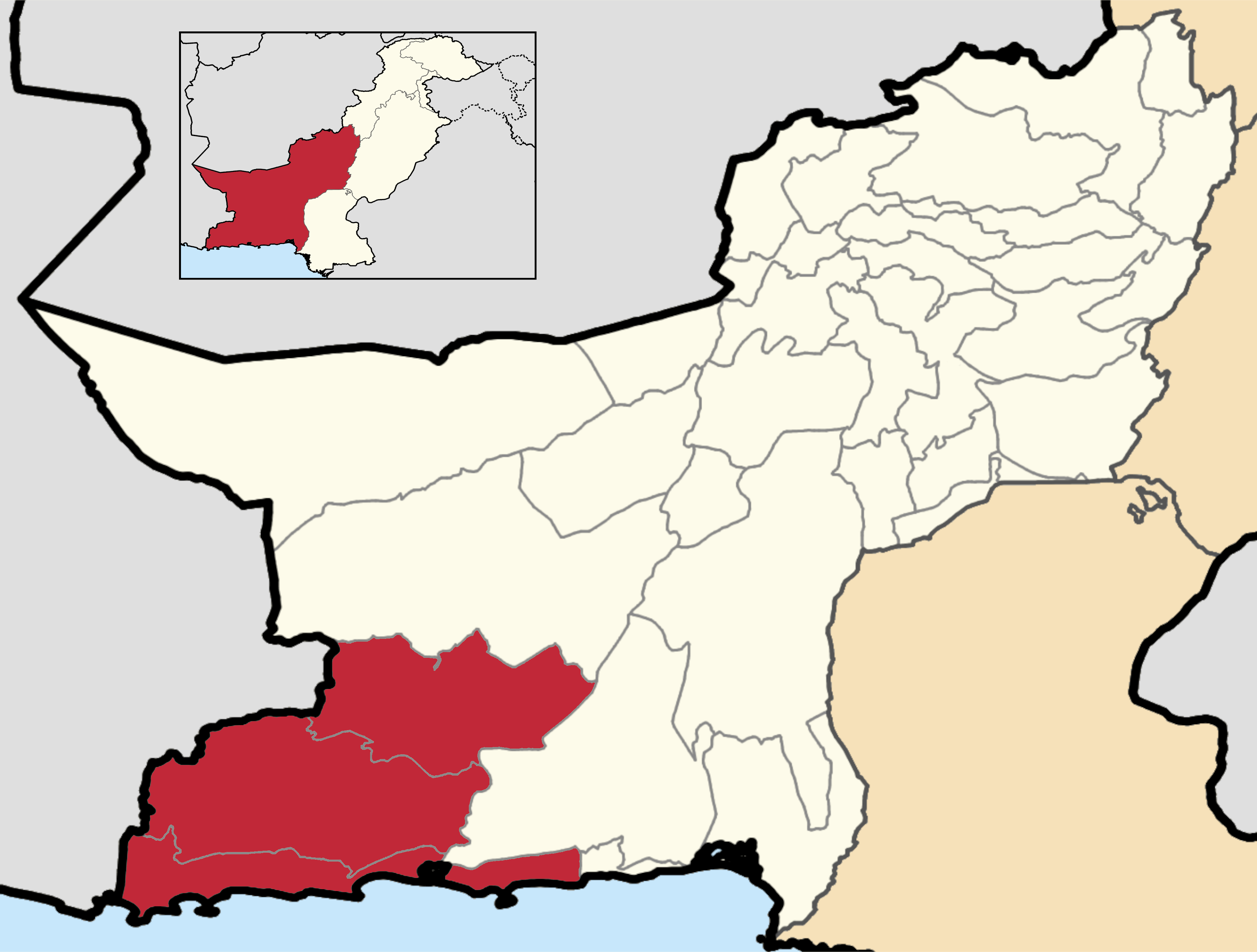
- Map of Makuran Division
- Country: Pakistan
- Province: Balochistan
- Capital: Turbat
- Established: 1 July 1970

Government
  - Type: Divisional Administration
  - Commissioner: N/A
  - Regional Police Officer: N/A

Area
  - Division: 52,067 km^{2} (20,103 sq mi)

Population (2023)
  - Division: 1,875,872
  - Density: 36.03/km^{2} (93.3/sq mi)
  - Urban: 703,374 (37.50%)
  - Rural: 1,172,498 (62.5%)

Ethnicities
  - Language Speakers: Largest: Balochs (99.37%); Others: Brahvis (0.07%)

Literacy
  - Literacy rate: Total: (47.69%); Male: (53.02%); Female: (41.73%)

Makuran Division (Urdu: مکران ڈویژن) is an administrative division of Balochistan Province, Pakistan. It is located in southern Balochistan along the Gulf of Oman coast. The CNIC Code of Makuran Division is 52. In July 2026, it was renamed from Makran Division to Makuran Division.

== History ==
On 3 October 1952, the former princely state of Makran under the British Raj joined Pakistan and merged with three other states to form the Baluchistan States Union.

On 14 October 1955, after the dissolution of the Baluchistan States Union, Makuran was given the status of a district of Kalat Division of Balochistan province.

In 1958, Gwadar town was brought from Oman, included in Makran District and constituted a tehsil.

On 1 July 1970, Makran was established as a division of Balochistan Province by the bifurcation of Kalat Division, with the three tehsils of Makuran district: Turbat, Panjgur and Gwadar being upgraded to district status.

== List of the Districts ==
#	District	Headquarter	Area (km²)	Pop. (2023)	Density (ppl/km²) (2023)	Lit. rate (2023)
1	Panjgur	Panjgur	16,891	509,781	30.2	42.07%
2	Gwadar	Gwadar	12,637	305,160	24.2	50.30%
3	Kech	Turbat	22,539	1,060,931	47.0	49.65%
4	Tump	Tump	11,621	1,201,71	37.0	42.71%

== List of the Tehsils ==
Tehsil	Area (km²)	Population (2023)	Density (ppl/km²) (2023)	Literacy rate (2023)	Districts
Gwadar Tehsil	2,590	147,673	57.02		Gwadar
Jiwani Tehsil	454	35,004	77.10		Gwadar
Ormara Tehsil	2,796	27,832	9.95		Gwadar
Pasni Tehsil	4,822	74,128	15.37		Gwadar
Suntsar Tehsil	1,975	20,523	10.39		Gwadar
Turbat Tehsil	9,742	470,605	48.31		Kech
Balnigor Tehsil	1,238	50,404	40.71		Kech
Buleda Tehsil	1,997	107,847	54.00		Kech
Dasht Tehsil	2,486	90,080	36.23		Kech
Zamuran Tehsil	1,462	71,616	48.98		Kech
Gayab Tehsil	...	...	...		Kech
Solband Tehsil	...	...	...		Kech
Gowargo Tehsil	1,471	31,718	21.56		Panjgur
Panjgur Tehsil	2,945	392,277	133.20		Panjgur
Paroom Tehsil	3,378	31,113	9.21		Panjgur
Gichk Tehsil	8,387	33,578	4.00		Panjgur
Tump Tehsil	1,945	147,041	75.60		Tump
Mand Tehsil	1,456	56,772	38.99		Tump

== Constituencies ==
District	Provincial Assembly Constituency	National Assembly Constituency
Gwadar	PB-24 Gwadar	NA-259 Kech-cum-Gwadar
Kech	PB-25 Kech-I	NA-259 Kech-cum-Gwadar
Kech	PB-26 Kech-II	NA-259 Kech-cum-Gwadar
Kech	PB-27 Kech-III	NA-258 Panjgur-cum-Kech
Kech	PB-28 Kech-IV	NA-258 Panjgur-cum-Kech
Panjgur	PB-29 Panjgur-I	NA-258 Panjgur-cum-Kech
Panjgur	PB-30 Panjgur-II	NA-258 Panjgur-cum-Kech

== Demographics ==
=== Population ===
Historical population
Year	Pop.	±% p.a.
1951	...	—
1961	...	—
1972	...	—
1981	652,602	—
1998	832,753	+1.44%
2017	1,489,015	+3.11%
2023	1,875,872	+3.92%

According to 2023 census, Makuran division had a population of 1,875,872 roughly equal to the country of Kosovo or the US state of Idaho

=== Religion ===
Religious groups in Makuran Division (from 1911 to 2023)
Religious group	1911		1921		1931		1941		2023	
Religious group	Pop.	%	Pop.	%	Pop.	%	Pop.	%	Pop.	%
Islam	71,758	99.74%	71,625	99.67%	68,213	99.64%	86,406	99.72%	1,862,440	99.41%
Hinduism	137	0.19%	216	0.3%	233	0.34%	206	0.24%	1,541	0.08%
Christianity	40	0.06%	11	0.02%	11	0.02%	20	0.02%	6,574	0.35%
Sikhism	2	0%	8	0.01%	3	0%	17	0.02%	215	0.01%
Zoroastrianism	4	0.01%	0	0%	0	0%	1	0%	11	0%
Buddhism	1	0%	0	0%	0	0%	0	0%	0	0%
Judaism	0	0%	0	0%	2	0%	1	0%	0	0%
Jainism	0	0%	0	0%	0	0%	0	0%	0	0%
Tribal	—N/a	—N/a	—N/a	—N/a	0	0%	0	0%	0	0%
Others	0	0%	0	0%	0	0%	0	0%	2,570	0.13%
Total population	71,942	100%	71,860	100%	68,462	100%	86,651	100%	1,873,426	100%
Note: British Baluchistan era figures are for the Makuran Division of Kalat State, which roughly corresponds to present-day Makuran Division.

The population mainly consists of Siddis, Meds, and other tribes of aboriginal descent such as the Darzadis, Koras (seaman), with a significant population of Arabs.

== See also ==
- Districts of Pakistan
  - Districts of Balochistan
- Tehsils of Pakistan
  - Tehsils of Balochistan
- Divisions of Pakistan
  - Divisions of Balochistan
  - Divisions of Khyber Pakhtunkhwa
  - Divisions of Punjab
  - Divisions of Sindh
  - Divisions of Azad Kashmir
  - Divisions of Gilgit-Baltistan
- Makuran
