= Tasp =

TASP may refer to:

- Telluride Association Summer Program, American educational programme
- Treatment as prevention (TasP)
- Tasp, a fictional device in the Known Space universe
- Tasp, a town in Balochistan province
