= Ma'danid dynasty =

Medieval dynasty in South Asia (c. 10th-11th century)

Ma'adanid dynasty
- 10th century–11th century
- Makran located on the south of Ghaznavid Empire
- Status: Largely autonomous Emirate under the Saffarids, Buyids (970–?) and then Ghaznavids (?–1078)
- Capital: Kech
- Common languages: Arabic (Official)
- Religion: Islam
- Mahraj
  - Until 1025/26 CE: Ma'adan ibn Ali (First known)
  - 1031–1058 CE: Abu'l -'Askar Husayn (last)
- Historical era: Early Medieval period
  - Established: 10th century
  - Disestablished: 11th century
Preceded by	Succeeded by
Abbasid Caliphate	Sultanate of Makran
- Today part of: Pakistan

The Ma'danid dynasty was a medieval Islamic dynasty that ruled in Makran from the late 9th or early 10th century until around the 11th century.

== History ==
Makran had been one of the easternmost provinces of the caliphate after its conquest by the Muslims in 644. In the 9th century, especially after the Abbasid dynasty's hold on the frontier provinces of the caliphate began to weaken, Makran had been overrun by Kharijites. According to the historian al-Mas’ūdī the Kharijites were still a significant force in Makran by the time the Ma'danids took control there.

By the early 10th century, the Banu Ma'dan had risen to power in Makran. Ibn Haukal does not mention their origins. Ma'danids used the Sanskrit title of Mahraj. They established their capital at Kiz or Kij, and although seldom playing a major role in regional affairs, Ma'danids were able to maintain their authority in Makran for at least a century and a half. At some point the Ma'danids became tributary to the Saffarid dynasty of Sistan. In 907/908 the Saffarid prince Al-Laith invaded Makran after 'Isa had gone into arrears on the required payments, and was able to compel the Ma'danid to give three years' worth of tribute.

Payments to the Saffarids lasted until the mid-10th century at the latest. In 971 the Buyid amir 'Adud al-Daula, who had recently conquered the bordering province of Kerman from the Banu Ilyas, compelled the Ma'danids to recognize Buyid suzerainty. Soon after this, however, the Ma'danids switched their loyalties to the Turkish ruler of Ghazni, Sabuktigin, beginning nearly a century of allegiance to the Ghaznavid dynasty.

In the early 11th century the ruler of Makran was Ma'dan. After Ma'dan's death in 1025/1026 a succession dispute broke out among his two sons, 'Isa and Abu'l-'Askar Husayn. The Ghaznavid sultan Mahmud (r. 998–1030) negotiated a settlement between the brothers, but it broke down when 'Isa rebelled against the Ghaznavids in 1029. Two years later Mahmud's son Mas'ud sent an army which killed 'Isa and installed Abu'l-'Askar Husayn in his place. The latter ruled Makran until after 1058 and was known as a man of learning. Makran remained vassal under the Ghaznavids until 1078. The power of the Ma'danids came to an end, presumably in the late 11th or 12th century.

== See also ==
- History of Balochistan
- List of Sunni Muslim dynasties
