= Paroom =

Pakistani town

Paroom پاروم
- Town
- Location within Balochistan, Pakistan Location within Pakistan
- Coordinates: 26°34′17″N 63°23′6″E
- Country: Pakistan
- Province: Balochistan
- District: Panjgur
- Tehsil: Paroom

Population
  - City: ~50,000
- Time zone: UTC+5 (PST)
- Number of Union councils: 1

Paroom (also spelled Parome) is a town and administrative headquarters of the Paroom Tehsil in Panjgur District, located in the western Makran region of Balochistan, Pakistan. It serves as a local administrative and agricultural centre within a largely arid landscape. The population of Paroom is estimated at around 50,000 people.

== Etymology ==
The word paroom (or parom) is derived from the Balochi language word for "growth", reflecting the area's comparatively fertile soil and its capacity to sustain multiple crop cycles annually, which is unusual for the region. According to local tradition, the settlement was also was also historically known as Gulshan, a Persian language term meaning "rose garden", a reference to the valley's former lushness along historic Makran trade routes.

== Climate ==
Paroom has a dry, arid climate shaped by its elevation within the Panjgur District. In contrast to much of Makran, where temperatures frequently exceed 40°C, Paroom experiences comparatively mild and more pleasant summers, while winters can be cool to cold. Rainfall is limited and occurs mainly between February and April, as well as during the early monsoon months of June and July, supporting local agriculture.
