= Makrani =

Makrani may refer to:

- Makrani dialect, a variety of Balochi spoken on the Makran coast of Pakistan and Iran
- Makrani, a subgroup of the Baloch people in India (in Gujarat), originally from Makran
  - Kadu Makrani (1811-1887), Indian rebel against British rule
- A person from Makran Region of balochistan

== See also ==
- Makran (disambiguation)
