= Rakshan River =

River in Pakistan

Coordinates: 27.1667°N 63.45°E

The Rakshan River (Urdu: دریائے رخشن) rises at the Nidoki pass, south-west of Shireza, district Washuk, Balochistan, Pakistan.

== Geography ==
At its origin, it is known as Nag river and runs south-westward. It unites with the lop stream at a point to west of Nag-e-Kalat. It then flows west-south-west through the centre of the long valley which in its centre contains Panjgur city, Makran. Parallel with the river also run the Siahan Range in the north and the Zangi Lak hills in the south. At its start, the Rakshan possesses little or no water, however, in Panjgur it expands into a series of bright clear pools (kor joh) connected with each other by small water channels running over a pebbly bed. The banks here are bordered with numerous date palms and most of the water is used for irrigation. To the west of Kallag, the last village in Panjgur is Dabbag, where there are more pools and many long grass, tamarisk and kahur trees in which wild pigs were to be found in the early 20th century.

== Tributaries ==
The only considerable tributaries joining the river west of Panjgur are the Mazan Dashtuk from the west, the Askani from the east, and the Gwargo from the south. After traversing Panjgur, the main stream turns northward and joins the Mashkel River from Kuhak on the Iranian side just south of the point where it bursts through the Koh-e-Sabz range by the Tank-e-Grawag or Grawag defile.

The Mashkel River crosses the Siahan Range at Tank-e-Zurrati and runs along the western side of Kharan to the Hamun-i-Mashkel, the total length from the source of the Rakshan being 258 miles.

== Physical features ==
Through a considerable water course, the banks of the Rakshan are low, shelving and irregular, consisting of hard clay known as kork in the Balochi language. The river carries high floods, but owing to its breadth they never do much harm. The bed contains a little tamarisk or grass to relieve the monotony of the barren region which it traverses. Though the river is easy to cross, dangerous quicksands exist in some places.

== Sixteenth-century dam ==
Close to Bonistan village, there are remains of a 16th-century dam which is known as Band-e-Gillar. However, little research or historic evidence is available to determine how the dam was built and how the water was used downstream.
