= Kashap =

'Kashap' (کاشاپ) is a small valley nestled within the Makran Division of Balochistan, Pakistan. Situated west of Dasht Kech in the Dasht Tehsil of Kech District, Kashap boasts a unique location south of Mand and cradled by the majestic Sohor Munkh mountains to the west. The valley's fame stems from its picturesque geography, characterized by both rugged mountains and the life-giving Gwargi Kohr river. Originating in neighboring Iran, the river flows through Mand and Kashap before emptying its waters into the Arabian Sea.

People and Culture: The inhabitants of Kashap are predominantly Sunni Muslims, with the Askani and Rind tribes forming the main social fabric. The 2022-23 census recorded a population of roughly 5200. However, a significant portion of the community has sought opportunities abroad, migrating to the United Arab Emirates, Bahrain, and Qatar.

History and Legacy: Local tradition suggests the name Kashap translates to "leaf water," hinting at the area's natural abundance. The founding of the village is attributed to lashkari Askani, with his descendants, including his grandson, still residing in the valley.............Kashap is the name of a village. This village was settled three hundred years ago. The people of this village migrated from Iranian Balochistan Saravan And Sarbaaz settled here. The people here belong to the Askani and Rind tribes. Kashap. is located 110 km west From Turbat District Kech .and 47 km north is Mand. And 55 km west is the border of Iran. And 90 km south is Gwadar. The founder of Kashap, Mir Lashkari Jalab and his relatives, settled here. The Kashap consists of three villages, Kashap, Kalsar, and Jamak. The people here are related.

Sources of income are farming and hard labor.
