= Zahoor Ahmed Buledi =

Pakistani politician

Provincial Minister of the Balochistan for Finance
- In office 30 August 2018 – 12 August 2023

Member of the Provincial Assembly of the Balochistan
- In office 13 August 2018 – 12 August 2023
- Constituency: PB-45 (Kech-I)
- Incumbent
- Assumed office 28 February 2024
- Constituency: PB-25 (Kech-I)

Personal details
- Party: PPP (2023-present)
- Other political affiliations: BAP (2018-2023)

Zahoor Ahmed Buledi is a Pakistani politician who was the Provincial Minister of the Balochistan for Finance, in office from 30 August 2018 till 12 August 2023. He had been a member of Provincial Assembly of the Balochistan from August 2018 to August 2023. He is from Buleda, a tehsil of Kech District, and a graduate from Forman Christian College Lahore. He was elected as a member of the Provincial Assembly in 2008 for the first time. He was elected as member provincial assembly of Balochistan and served as a Provincial Minister for Gwadar and Coastal Development until 2013. He served as the Finance Minister of Balochistan.

== Political career ==
He was elected to the Provincial Assembly of the Balochistan as a candidate of Balochistan Awami Party (BAP) from Constituency PB-45 (Kech-I) in the 2018 Pakistani general election.

On 27 August 2018, he was inducted into the provincial Balochistan cabinet of Chief Minister of Jam Kamal Khan. On 30 August, he was appointed as Provincial Minister of Balochistan for information.
