= Tasp, Pakistan =

Pakistani town

Tasp Urdu: ٹیسپ
- Town
- Location of Tasp Tasp (Pakistan)
- Coordinates: 26°58′59″N 64°03′20″E
- Country: Pakistan
- Province: Balochistan
- District: Panjgur
- Tehsil: Panjgur

Population (2023)
  - Total: 66,030
- Time zone: UTC+5 (PST)

Tasp (Urdu: ٹیسپ) is a town in Panjgur Tehsil, Panjgur District, in southwestern Balochistan, Pakistan.

== Demographics ==
=== Population ===
Historical population
Year	Pop.	±% p.a.
2017	35,798	—
2023	66,030	+10.74%

According to the 2023 Pakistani census Tasp had a population of 66,030, up from 35,798 at the 2017 census.

=== Languages ===
Languages of Tasp

Languages of Tasp city (2023 Census)
1. Balochi (99.6%)
2. Kashmiri (0.20%)
3. Urdu (0.10%)
4. Others (0.10%)

Balochi is spoken as a mother tongue by more than 99% of the population, consistent with the broader pattern across Panjgur District.
