= Dasht Shahbaz =

Historical place in Balochistan, Pakistan

Coordinates: 26°41′32″N 63°57′58″E

Dasht Shahbaz or Shahbaz Kalat is a historical place in tehsil Gwargo of Panjgur District in the Balochistan province of Pakistan. It is located at 26°41'32N 63°57'58E at an altitude of 884 metres (2903 feet).
