= Gowargo Tehsil =

Pakistani administrative area

Gowargo Balochi: تحصیل گوارگو
- Tehsil of Panjgur District
- Location within Balochistan, Pakistan Location within Pakistan
- Coordinates: 26°47′N 64°16′E
- Country: Pakistan
- Province: Balochistan
- District: Panjgur District

Area
  - Tehsil of Panjgur District: 1,471 km^{2} (568 sq mi)

Population (2023)
  - Tehsil of Panjgur District: 31,718
  - Density: 21.56/km^{2} (55.8/sq mi)
  - Urban: 0 (0%)
  - Rural: 31,718 (100%)

Literacy
  - Literacy rate: Total: (27.57%); Male: (31.66%); Female: (22.55%)
- Time zone: UTC+5 (PST)
- Main languages: 31,657 Balochi, 30 Kashmiri, 21 Urdu

Gowargo Tehsil is an administrative subdivision (tehsil) of Panjgur District in southwestern Balochistan, Pakistan. It covers an area of 1,471 square kilometres (568 sq mi). As per the 2023 Pakistani census, the tehsil's population stood at 31,718. The town of Gowargo serves as the tehsil headquarters.

== Geography ==
Gowargo Tehsil lies in the south of Panjgur District. It is bordered by Paroom Tehsil to the west, Gichk Tehsil to the north and east, Hoshab Tehsil of Kech District to the south, and Awaran Tehsil to the southeast. The landscape is arid and rocky, consistent with the surrounding region, located in the dry tropical thorn and scrub vegetation zone characteristic of Makran. It is largely uninhabited, hilly, and with elevations averaging around 1,000 metres (3,300 ft). The terrain is arid, featuring ephemeral rivers and drought-resistant xerophytic vegetation.

== Population ==
As per the 2023 national census, Gowargo Tehsil has a population of 31,718, all of whom reside in rural areas. The town of Gowargo serves as the tehsil headquarters. There are 9,059 households, all in rural settings.

The overall literacy rate is 27.57%, including 31.66% among males and 22.55% among females, pointing to persistent educational disparities, particularly for women.

Languages of Gowargo tehsil (2023)
1. Balochi (99.8%)
2. Others (0.19%)

=== Languages ===
Balochi is the overwhelmingly dominant language in Gowargo Tehsil, accounting for approximately 99.81% of the population. Other languages reported include Kashmiri (30 speakers, ~0.09%) and Urdu (21 speakers, ~0.07%).
