= Buleda, Pakistan =

Buleda بُلیده
- City
- Location within Pakistan
- Coordinates: 26.18°N 63.8°E
- Country: Pakistan
- Province: Balochistan
- District: Kech
- Tehsil: Buleda sub-division
- Elevation: 661 m (2,169 ft)

Population (2023)
  - Total: 68,752
- Time zone: UTC+5 (PST)
- Historical ruling claim: Buladai were the last ruling tribe of Balochistan before the British Raj and they are the descendants of Bealaida the son of Belus the Babylon King.

Buleda (Balochi and Urdu: بُلیدہ), is a city of Kech District in Balochistan province of Pakistan. It is a part of Makran Division situated in the north of Kech. It is located at an altitude of 503 meters (1653 feet) within the two arms of the central Makran range the Buledai or Kech band being on the south and the Zamuran Hills on the north.

It is a valley with the Gishkaur running through it, expanding here and there into large pools from which water for irrigation is taken in artificial channels, one of which the jawan mardan resembles a small canal. It is known for the abundance of its pasturage, and possesses a fairly extensive irrigated area and many date groves.

Buleda is said to have been the home of Buledai dynasty, there are many Dambis or cairns of the banks of a hill called the Dambani Kaur. There are two main dam which includes : 1 suloi dam. 2 jantari dam The number of permanent Union councils is seven, the principal among which are: Koshk, Sulo, Chib, Bit, Mainaz, Allandoor, and Gilli. The inhabitants are Sunni Muslims.

== Overview ==
The town is located in southwest of the Balochistan province in Pakistan it is situated north of Turbat close to Iranian border. Buleda was a major city of Baloch tribe and it was named Buledi after the city. The sardars when came for taking taxes from Zamuran so they were defeated by Shambezai, Yalanzai, Durrazai Lahbarzai and other Zamurani tribes jointly and they went back. Zamuran is the most rural populated and least developed area in Tehsil Buleda main tribes in Zamuran are Shambezai, Mohmad zai, Buledai, Duraazai, Lahbarzai, Askani, Kohda, shay and Raseey tribes. Also, Mir Kohda Gamani kalat is present at Soorag Zamuran.

== Demographics ==
=== Population ===
Historical population
Year	Pop.	±% p.a.
2017	39,813	—
2023	68,752	+9.53%

According to 2023 census, Buleda had a population of 68,752.

== Notable people ==
- Dr Yarjan Abdul Samad, First Pakistani space scientist to work at University of Cambridge.
- Sardar Ayub Buledi, Former Member Provincial Assembly of Balochistan, and Minister in Government of Balochistan, Pakistan and was chief of Buledi tribe
- Sardar Zahoor Ahmed Buledi, is the nephew of Sardar Ayub Buledi and Political and tribal successor of him. Currently he is Member Provincial Assembly of Balochistan and it his third tenure and Minister of Planning and development in Government of Balochistan, Pakistan, And Former Finance, Gwd Minister. And Chief of Buledi tribe after the death of Sardar Azeem Buledi who was son of Ayub Buledi.

== See also ==
- Turbat
- Bijarani
- Kashap
- Kech
