= Bonistan =

Village in Balochistan, Pakistan

Bonistan is a village and a Union Council in Panjgur District, Makran Division, Balochistan, Pakistan.

Close to the village lie the remains of a 16th-century dam, known as Band-e-Gillar. However, little research or historic evidence is available to determine how the dam was built and how the water was used downstream.

== Demographics ==
The population according to the 2023 census is approximately 58,007. Major tribes include Raees, Barr and Kashani.
