= Panjgur District =

District in Balochistan, Pakistan

Coordinates: 26°40′N 64°15′E

Panjgur District ضلع پنجگور پنجگور دمگ
- District of Balochistan
- Panjgur District
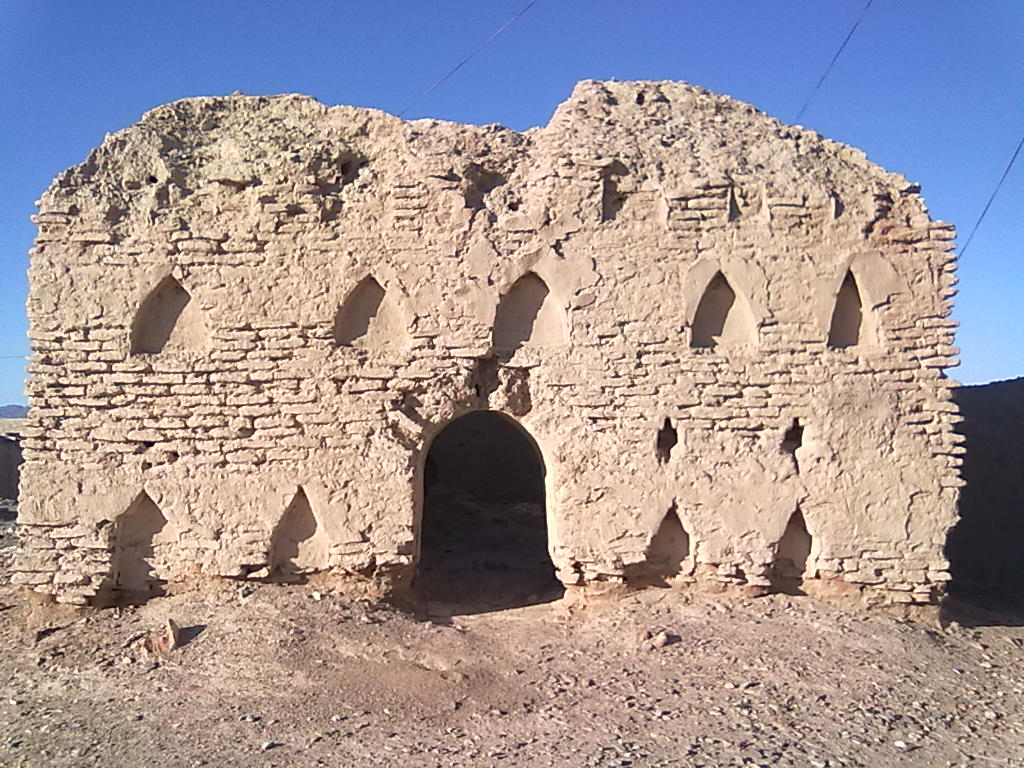
- Tomb of Allang Essai, Panjgur

- Map of Balochistan with Panjgur District highlighted
- Country: Pakistan
- Province: Balochistan
- Division: Makran
- Established: 1 July 1977
- Headquarters: Chitkan

Government
  - Type: District Administration

Area
  - District of Balochistan: 16,891 km^{2} (6,522 sq mi)
- Elevation: 980 m (3,220 ft)

Population (2023)
  - District of Balochistan: 509,781
  - Density: 30.181/km^{2} (78.167/sq mi)
  - Urban: 157,693 (30.93%)
  - Rural: 352,088 (69.07%)

Literacy
  - Literacy rate: Total: (42.07%); Male: (45.80%); Female: (37.80%)
- Time zone: UTC+5 (PST)
- Postal code: 93000
- Dialing code: 0855
- Number of Tehsils: 5
- Website: panjgur.balochistan.gov.pk

Panjgur District (Balochi: پنجگور دمگ; Urdu: ضلع پنجگور) is a district in the western part of Balochistan province, Pakistan, covering an area of 16,891 square kilometres (6,522 sq mi) with a population of 509,781 as of the 2023 census. It borders Iran to the west along the Iran–Pakistan border and lies within the broader Makran region. Chitkan serves as the principal urban centre and district headquarters.

Panjgur was one of three tehsils of the former Makran District until 1 July 1977, when Makran Division was created and Panjgur constituted as a separate district alongside Kech (Turbat) and Gwadar. The district is best known as one of Pakistan's principal producers of Muzati (Mazafati) dates and as the only highland agricultural zone in the Makran region.

== Etymology ==
The name Panjgur is most commonly interpreted as a compound of the Balochi words panj (five) and goran (highland), meaning "land of five highlands". Some scholars link goran to the Avestan word gairi (mountain), a derivation supported by nearby place names such as Chokgoran ("small highland") and Mazangoran ("big highland"). A second derivation combines panj with goor (grave), yielding "five graves", in reference to five venerated local tombs. A third interpretation reads the name as a compound of panj and kor (stream), meaning "five streams", which is said to have shifted over time to "Panjgur". None of these etymologies has been conclusively established.

== Geography ==
Panjgur District covers an area of 16,891 square kilometres (6,522 sq mi) in western Balochistan, sharing an international border with Sistan and Baluchestan province of Iran to the west. This boundary, known as the Goldsmid Line, was formalised as the Perso-Baloch frontier in the nineteenth century and continues to shape the economic and social life of the district's western tehsils. The district sits within a highland basin at an elevation of approximately 980 metres (3,220 ft) around Chitkan, ringed by arid mountain ranges that distinguish it from the lower-lying Makran coast. The Siahan Range forms the principal mountain barrier to the north. In the western and southwestern parts of the district, around Paroom Tehsil, elevations generally exceed 900 metres (3,000 ft) with peaks surpassing 1,300 metres (4,300 ft).

The Rakhshan River is the principal waterway, flowing through the centre of the district and dividing it broadly into northern and southern zones. Most human settlements are concentrated along its banks. The Gichk valley, in the southeastern part of the district, is a historically significant sub-region and the ancestral seat of the Gichki ruling dynasty of Makran. The River Tank, the district's second principal waterway, flows through the southeastern parts of the district, with the Gichki and Raghai streams among its tributaries.

Agriculture is the principal economic activity along the river corridor; irrigation depends mainly on karez underground channels fed by the subsurface flow of the Rakhshan River and kaurjos, small water channels drawn from pits dug into the perennial river flow and directed to fields. The remainder of the district is sparsely populated and characterised by arid and rocky terrain with xerophytic vegetation typical of the Makran region.

== History ==
The town of Panjgur is among the oldest documented settlements in the Makran region. Al-Muqaddasī, writing in 985 AD, recorded it, then known in Arabic as Bannajbur, as the capital of Makran and noted that it was inhabited by a people called Balūṣh, constituting the earliest known Arabic reference to the Baloch people. In 643 AD, Islamic forces under Abdullah conquered Makran and the region subsequently came under successive Arab rulers; Arab geographers of the era described it as largely desert. Over subsequent centuries the area passed through the hands of various conquerors, including the Deilamis, Seljuks, Ghaznavids, Ghurids, and Mongols, though local rulers such as the Hots, Rinds, Maliks, Buledais, and Gichkis maintained practical authority, as outside powers had no intention of permanent settlement.

The Buledais rose to prominence in the region through their association with the Zikri sect and maintained links with the rulers of Muscat; they held power for over a century before converting to mainstream Islam in their later years. The Gichki tribe, initially settled in the Gichk valley of Panjgur, subsequently rose to become the ruling class of the state of Makran from approximately 1740 until 1955. Their origins are debated; the most widely cited account describes them as Rajput migrants who arrived in Makran between the fifteenth and seventeenth centuries, gradually converting to Islam and establishing themselves through diplomacy and strategic alliances with local ruling families. The Gichkis were also initially associated with the Zikri sect, which brought them into conflict with the Khan of Kalat, Mir Nasir Khan I, who conducted several expeditions against Panjgur in the late eighteenth century with the aim of suppressing the Zikri faith. These campaigns resulted in revenue-sharing agreements between the Khan and the Gichkis rather than their outright subjugation.

Major Frederic John Goldsmid visited the Panjgur region in 1861 as part of British efforts to demarcate western Balochistan. By 1863 an Assistant Political Agent had been appointed in Gwadar with oversight over the broader district. In 1882, internal feuds led to the killing of Mir Gajian, Sardar of Panjgur and the Khan's representative, by Mir Nauroz Khan Nausherwani, Chief of Kharan. In 1903, a dedicated Assistant Political Agent was posted in Panjgur itself, also serving as Commandant of the Makran Levy Corps. Panjgur remained under the nominal suzerainty of the Khan of Kalat throughout the colonial period. The Goldsmid Line, formalised as the Perso-Baloch boundary, bisected several historical communities in the western parts of the district, separating populations with shared tribal, linguistic, and kinship ties across what became an international frontier.

Following the Partition of British India in 1947, the Makran region joined the Balochistan States Union in early 1949. In October 1955, Makran attained the status of a district within West Pakistan, and on 1 July 1970, following the dissolution of the One Unit scheme, it became one of eight districts of the new Balochistan province. Panjgur was formally designated as a separate district on 1 July 1977.

=== Post-independence ===
In its post-independence history, Panjgur faced two significant natural disasters. In 1958–59, heavy rains and subsequent flooding caused extensive damage to date trees and crops across the district. In 1960, cholera outbreaks occurred in the villages of Bonistan and Isai, resulting in a serious loss of lives; these villages have continued to experience sporadic cholera cases owing to a lack of clean drinking water.

== Places of interest ==
The district contains several sites of historical and archaeological significance. Kuhna Kalat, constructed with large baked red bricks, is among the notable ancient structures. The tomb of Malik Asa and the ancient dam known as Band-e-Gillar are further points of historical interest. In the village of Khudabadan, remnants of the fort of Nawab Habibullah Khan of Kharan survive. The district also houses numerous old shrines, including those of Shah Qalandar and Pir Umar, which feature distinctive architectural elements such as baked tiles adorned with figures of humans and animals. The tomb of Allang Essai in Panjgur is a well-known local monument. Vestiges of the old settlement of Isai also survive within the district.

The Paroom area in the southwest of the district served historically as a principal junction for trade routes connecting Afghanistan, Nushki, and Kharan with the coastal ports of Gwadar, Jiwani, and Iranian Chabahar, making control of the region a source of considerable local power. The fort at Diz, whose name itself means "fort" in Balochi, was the main historical stronghold of the area.

== Administrative divisions ==
The district is administratively subdivided into five tehsils.

Tehsil	Area (km²)	Population (2023)	Density (per km²)	Literacy rate (2023)
Panjgur Tehsil	2,945	392,277	133.20	46.19%
Paroom Tehsil	3,378	31,113	9.21	38.64%
Kallag Tehsil	710	21,095	29.71	38.40%
Gowargo Tehsil	1,471	31,718	21.56	27.57%
Gichk Tehsil	8,387	33,578	4.00	20.15%
Total	16,891	509,781	30.18	

Panjgur Tehsil is by far the most populous, accounting for over three-quarters of the district's total population and containing the city of Panjgur and the district headquarters at Chitkan. Gichk Tehsil is the largest by area but the most sparsely settled, at 4 persons per km². Paroom Tehsil lies along the Iranian border in the southwest of the district.

== Economy ==
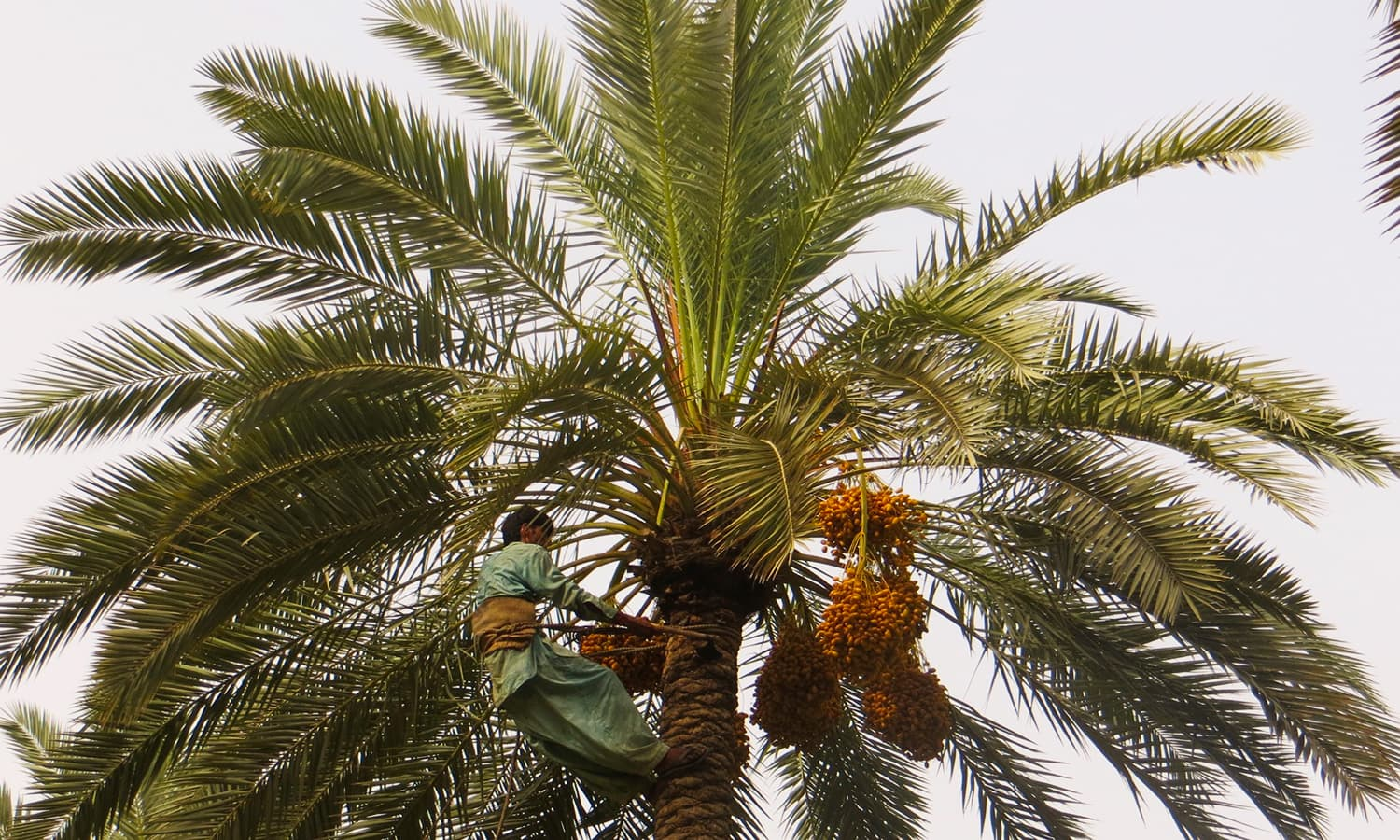
Panjgoor's dates

Agriculture forms the backbone of the district's economy, employing approximately 67% of the total workforce, with around 6% of land under cultivation, mostly in small landholdings. The district is one of Pakistan's foremost producers of Muzati (Mazafati) dates, a high-quality table variety, with production estimated to account for approximately 10% of total district revenue.

Panjgur's dates are widely consumed domestically and exported internationally; demand has grown on account of their recognised health benefits and their use as an ingredient in processed food products. The global market for dates was projected to grow at a compound annual growth rate of 3.6% between 2020 and 2025, and Panjgur's dates are noted for their favourable taste and texture.

Irrigated land, supplied through traditional karez underground channels fed by the subsurface flow of the Rakhshan River, is mainly used for fruit cultivation. Rain-fed and flood-irrigated land supports wheat, jowar, barley, and rice. To protect the karez system, the development of tubewells and dugwells has been banned across the district, with communal karez ownership having developed as a collective norm over time. Livestock rearing remains a significant component of rural livelihoods throughout the district.

Cross-border trade with Iran is an important feature of the economy in the western tehsils, particularly Paroom Tehsil, where goods including fuel, tiles, and daily-use commodities flow across the border.

== Demographics ==
=== Population ===
Historical population
Year	Pop.	±% p.a.
1951	29,560	—
1961	27,228	−0.82%
1972	56,820	+6.92%
1981	160,750	+12.25%
1998	234,051	+2.23%
2017	315,353	+1.58%
2023	509,781	+8.33%

As of the 2023 census, Panjgur District has 117,089 households and a population of 509,781. The district has a sex ratio of 112.09 males to 100 females. 155,552 persons (30.51%) are under 10 years of age, and 157,693 (30.93%) live in urban areas. The overall literacy rate is 42.07%: 45.80% for males and 37.80% for females.

=== Religion ===
Religions in Panjgur district (2023)
Religion	Percent
Islam	99.20%
Christianity	0.44%
Other or not stated	0.36%

In the 2023 census, 4,079 (0.8%) people in the district were from religious minorities, mainly Christians.

=== Language ===
Languages of Panjgur District (2023 Census)
1. Balochi (99.6%)
2. Kashmiri (0.15%)
3. Urdu (0.09%)
4. Others (0.13%)

Balochi is the overwhelmingly predominant language, spoken as a mother tongue by 99.63% of the population. Kashmiri (approximately 0.15%), Urdu (approximately 0.09%), and other languages account for the remainder.

== Security ==
Panjgur District lies within an area affected by the Baloch insurgency, which has intensified across the province since the early 2000s. The Balochistan Liberation Army (BLA), designated a terrorist organisation by Pakistan, the United States, and the European Union, has carried out attacks on security forces and infrastructure across the Makran region. The insurgency is not confined to the district headquarters area; the more remote and sparsely policed tehsils of Gichk and Paroom are also affected, with the latter's position along the Iranian border adding a further dimension to security challenges. In February 2022, the BLA's Majeed Brigade launched simultaneous assaults on military camps in Panjgur and Nushki, described by analysts as a tactical shift towards temporarily seizing and holding territory.

== Transport ==
Panjgur Airport (IATA: PJG, ICAO: OPPG) is a domestic airport serving the district. The district is connected to Quetta via the N-85 National Highway; long-distance bus services along this route are the primary mode of travel for most residents travelling to larger cities. In the western tehsils, informal cross-border movement with Iran via the Paroom area is a longstanding feature of local life, though no formal border crossing point is currently operational in the district.

== See also ==
- List of tehsils of Balochistan
- Districts of Balochistan, Pakistan
