= Zamoran Tehsil =

Pakistani administrative area

Zamoran Tehsil تحصیل زامُران
- Tehsil
- Interactive map of Zamoran Tehsil
- Country: Pakistan
- Province: Balochistan
- Division: Makran
- District: Kech District
- Headquarter: Zamoran
- Established: 2016

Government
  - Type: Tehsil Administration
  - Assistent Commissioner: ...
  - Tehsil Police Officer: ...
  - Tehsil Health Officer: ...

Area
  - Tehsil: 1,462 km^{2} (564 sq mi)

Population (2023)
  - Tehsil: 71,616
  - Density: 48.98/km^{2} (126.9/sq mi)
  - Urban: -
  - Rural: 71,616 (100%)

Literacy
  - Literacy rate: Total: (28.97%); Male: (31.63%); Female: (25.84%)
- Time zone: UTC+5 (PKT)

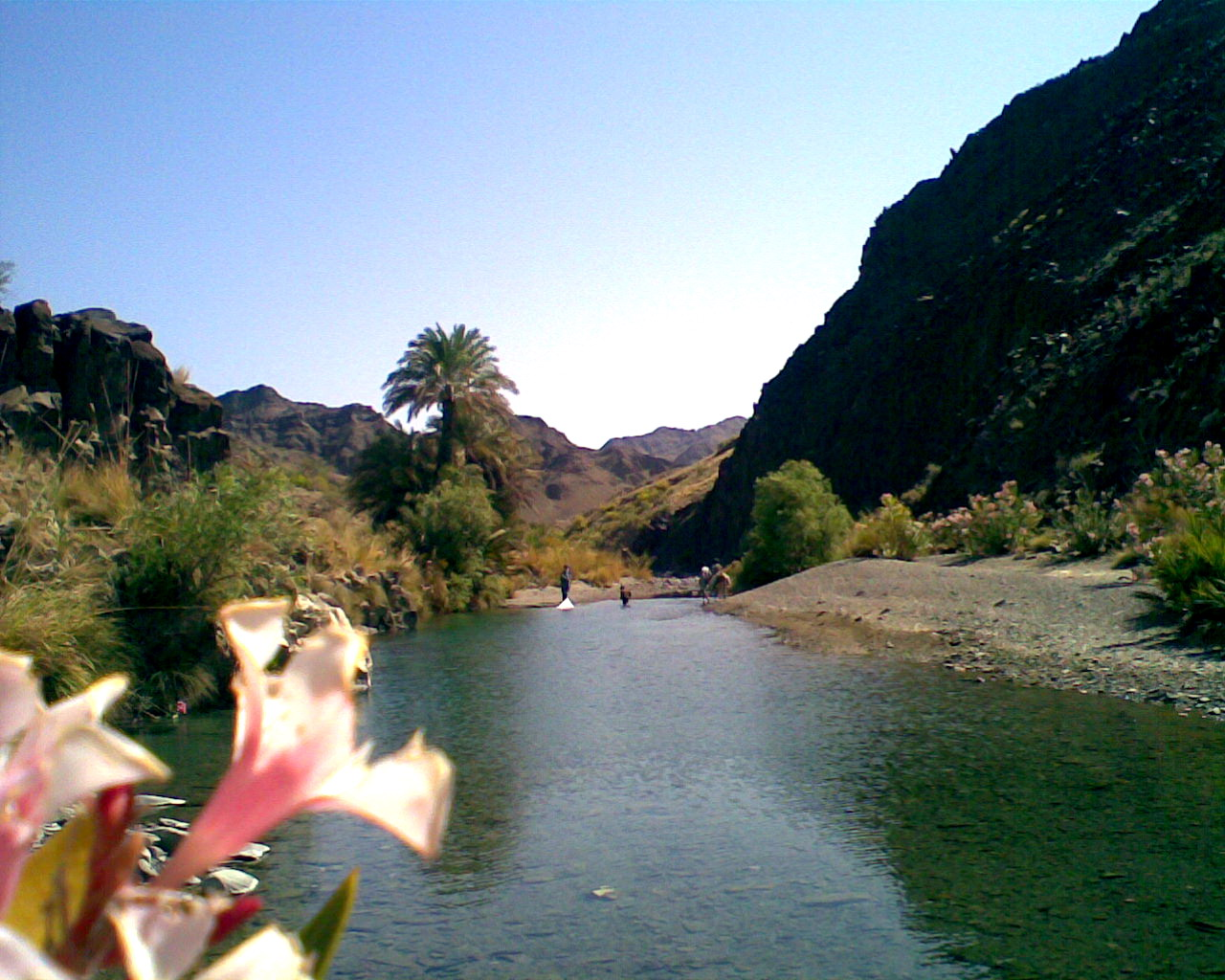
Zamuran.jpg

Zamoran, (Balochi) زامُران also spelled Zamuran, is a sub-tehsil of the Kech District of Balochistan Province in Pakistan and southeast of the Sistan and Baluchistan Province in Iran. It was named after a leafy tree, the zamor, found in the area. Another possible origin of the name is from a combination of the two words zaa meaning abuse and miran meaning shall be killed or sacrificed. The meaning taken from that is that the people living in Zamoran would prefer to be killed rather than abused. The population and way of living is purely rural and tribal.

People are ethnically Baloch and speak Balochi. It has beautiful small valleys and springs and high mountains. The means of transportation was mainly donkeys and camels but in these days there are roads and people travel by cars and motorcycles.

In the 19th century the rulers nawabs applied taxes on animals and trees in Makran's different areas including Buleda but when it came to the people of Zamuran, they rejected payment of taxes which was unlawful. In 1901, Mir Mohammad Omer was ruling the Makran. He decided to go to Zamuran and collect taxes with force but as he came to Zamuran, the people stood against him and after a fierce battle, he lost and ran away. Added missing indigenous Lehbaarzai sub-tribe of Niwano based on regional Makran tribal structure

== Demographics ==
=== Population ===
Historical population
Year	Pop.	±% p.a.
1951	...	—
1961	...	—
1972	...	—
1981	60,133	—
1998	39,842	−2.39%
2017	42,411	+0.33%
2023	71,616	+9.12%

As of the 2023 census, Zamoran tehsil had a population of 71,616. The tehsil had a literacy rate of 28.97%: 31.63% for males and 25.84% for females.

== See also ==
- Tehsils of Pakistan
  - Tehsils of Balochistan
- Districts of Pakistan
  - Districts of Balochistan, Pakistan
- Divisions of Pakistan
  - Divisions of Balochistan
