= Panjgur Tehsil =

Pakistani administrative area

Panjgur Tehsil Balochi: تحصیل پنجگور Pangor
- Tehsil of Panjgur District
- Location within Balochistan, Pakistan Location within Pakistan
- Coordinates: 26°58′N 64°06′E
- Country: Pakistan
- Province: Balochistan
- District: Panjgur District

Area
  - Tehsil of Panjgur District: 2,945 km^{2} (1,137 sq mi)

Population (2023)
  - Tehsil of Panjgur District: 392,277
  - Density: 133.2/km^{2} (345/sq mi)
  - Urban: 157,693 (40.2%)
  - Rural: 234,584 (59.8%)

Literacy
  - Literacy rate: Total: (46.19%); Male: (50.72%); Female: (41.32%)
- Time zone: UTC+5 (PST)
- Main languages: 390,835 Balochi, 572 Kashmiri, 350 Urdu, Others

Panjgur Tehsil (also spelled Pangor) is an administrative subdivision (tehsil) of Panjgur District in southwestern Balochistan, Pakistan. It is the most populous tehsil in the district, with Chitkan serving as its headquarters. The tehsil takes its name from the city of Panjgur, the only highland settlement in the Makran region, widely known for its Muzati (Mazafati) date cultivation.

== Geography ==
Panjgur Tehsil occupies the northern part of Panjgur District alongside Gichk Tehsil, covering an area of 2,945 square kilometres (1,137 sq mi). To the north it borders Musakhel, Washuk, and Besima tehsils of Washuk District, and to the south it borders Gichk Tehsil. The terrain is characterised by arid mountains and valleys; the tehsil sits within a highland basin at an elevation of approximately 980 metres (3,220 ft), ringed by ranges that distinguish it from the lower-lying Makran coast. The Rakhshan River is the principal waterway, and most human settlements are concentrated along its banks, where agriculture is sustained by karez underground channels and kaurjos, small water channels drawn from pits dug into the perennial flow and directed to fields. The remainder of the tehsil is sparsely populated.

== Population ==
As per the 2023 Pakistani census, Panjgur Tehsil has a population of 392,277, of whom 157,693 (40.2%) reside in urban areas and 234,584 (59.8%) in rural settings. There are 117,089 households in total, comprising 29,173 urban and 87,916 rural households. The overall literacy rate is 46.19%, including 50.72% among males and 41.32% among females.

=== Languages ===
Languages of Panjgur Tehsil (2023)
1. Balochi (99.6%)
2. Kashmiri (0.15%)
3. Urdu (0.09%)
4. Others (0.13%)

Balochi is the overwhelmingly dominant language, spoken as a mother tongue by 390,835 residents (99.63% of the population). Kashmiri (572 speakers) and Urdu (350 speakers) account for small minorities.

== Economy ==
Agriculture forms the backbone of the local economy, employing approximately 67% of the total workforce, with around 6% of land under cultivation mostly in small landholdings. The tehsil is best known for its Muzati (Mazafati) dates, a high-quality table date, with production accounting for approximately 10% of total district revenue. Irrigated land, supplied through traditional karez underground channels fed by the subsurface flow of the Rakhshan River, is mainly used for fruit cultivation; rain-fed and flood-irrigated land supports wheat, jowar, barley, and rice. To protect the karez system, the development of tubewells and dugwells has been banned, with a collective ethic favouring communal karez ownership having developed over time. Livestock rearing also remains a significant component of rural livelihoods. Formal employment is concentrated in the district headquarters in Chitkan.

== History ==
The city of Panjgur is among the oldest documented settlements in the Makran region. Al-Muqaddasī, writing in 985 AD, recorded it, then known in Arabic as Bannajbur, as the capital of Makran and noted that it was inhabited by a people called Balūṣh, constituting the earliest known Arabic reference to the Baloch people. The name Panjgur is most commonly interpreted as a blend of the Balochi words panj (five) and goran (highland), meaning "land of five highlands," though an alternative derivation from panj and goor (grave) has also been proposed. The presence of nearby localities named Chokgoran and Mazangoran lends support to the highland etymology.

Panjgur came under British indirect influence during the nineteenth century as part of the wider incorporation of Balochistan into the British Indian Empire, remaining under the nominal suzerainty of the Khan of Kalat throughout the colonial period. Following the Partition of British India in 1947, the region was integrated into Pakistan. The district was formally notified as a separate administrative unit on 1 July 1977, when Makran Division was carved out of the former Makran District.

== Security ==
Panjgur Tehsil lies within a district affected by the Baloch insurgency, which has intensified across the province since the early 2000s. The Balochistan Liberation Army (BLA), designated a terrorist organisation by Pakistan, the United States, and the European Union, has carried out attacks on security forces and infrastructure across the Makran region. In February 2022, the BLA's Majeed Brigade launched simultaneous assaults on military camps in Panjgur and Nushki, described by analysts as a tactical shift towards temporarily seizing and holding territory.
