= Makran (princely state) =

Princely state of British India and Pakistan

Makran state
- c.1740s–1955
- Flag

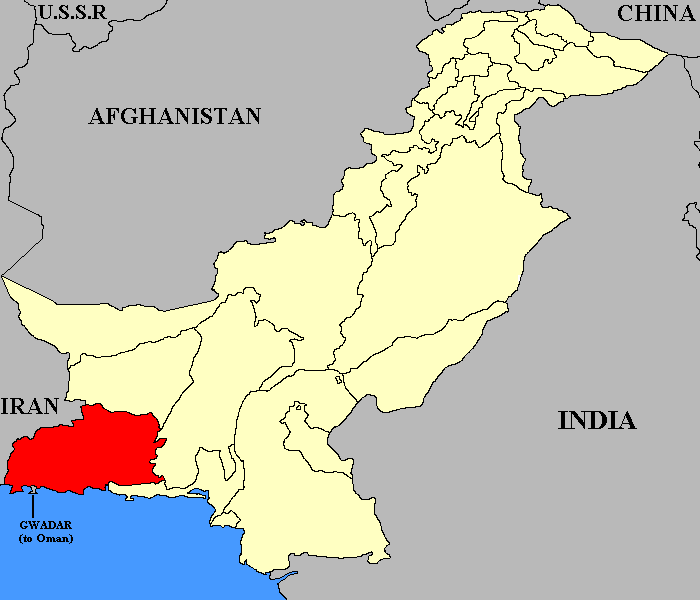
- Makran state in Pakistan 1955 (in red)
- Status: independent kingdom (1740s–1839) princely state under British Raj (1839–1947) princely state of Pakistan (1947–1955)
- Capital: Kech (Main); Panjgur (Cadet branch); Tump (Cadet branch)
- Common languages: Balochi; Brahui
- Religion: Islam
- Demonym: Makrani
- Government: Absolute monarchy
- Nawab
  - 1898-1917: Sardar Mir Mehrullah Khan (first known)
  - 1948-1955: Nawab Mir Bai Khan Gichki (last)
- History
  - Mulla Murad Gichki conquers Kech valley: c.1740s
  - Disestablished under One Unit Scheme: 1955

Area
  - Total: 23,196 sq mi (60,080 km^{2})

Population
  - 1951 census: 138,691
Preceded by	Succeeded by
Mughal Empire	Dominion of Pakistan
- Today part of: Pakistan

Makran (Urdu: ریاستِ مکران) was an autonomous princely state in a subsidiary alliance with British Indian Empire until 1947, before acceding as an autonomous princely state of Pakistan. It ceased to exist in 1955. It was located in the extreme southwest of present-day Pakistan; the areas it covered are now parts of the districts of Gwadar, Kech and Panjgur. The state did not include the enclave of Omani Gwadar, which was under Omani rule until 1958. At the time of first Pakistani census in 1951, it covered an area of 23,196 sq mi (60,080 km^{2}) and had a population of 138,691 people.

== History ==
Makran state was ruled by Gichki Nawabs, who were of Rajput origins. Their ancestor, Jagat Singh, had migrated from Rajputana in the 17th century and converted to Islam. The political turmoil in Makran during the 17th and 18th centuries attracted several bands of raiders from the neighbouring regions; among them were Buledi, Gichki, and Nausherwanis, the latter of whom were said to have originated in northeast Iran, who later established their state in Kharan.

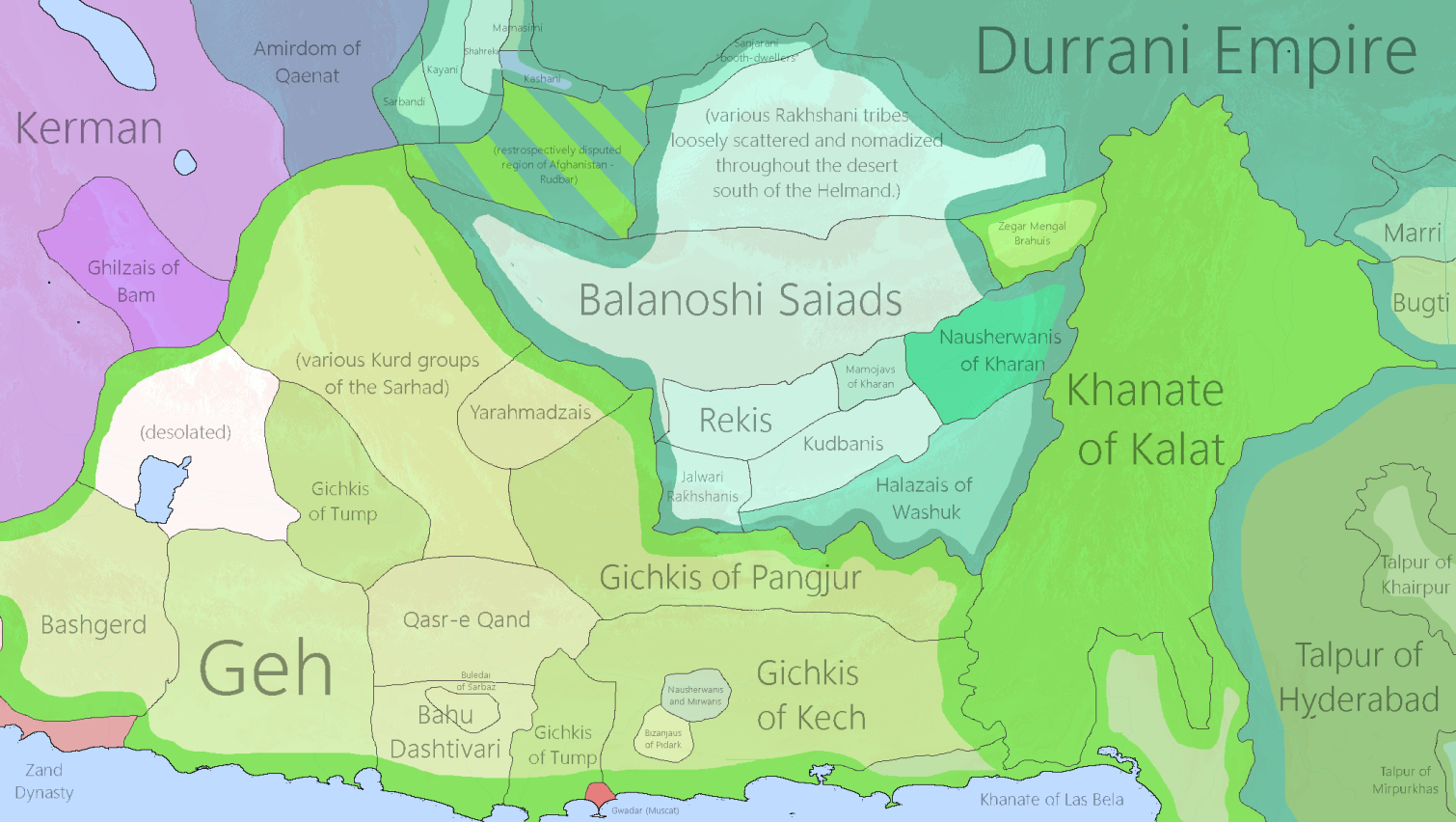
Gichki domains of Kech, Panjgur and Tump under the Khanate of Kalat in 1789

According to a locally well-known tradition from Makran, the ancestors of Gichki were forty Rajput horsemen from north; in an alliance with Buledi, Gichki killed the then ruler of Kech, a certain Malik Mirza. Soon conflict broke out between the two tribes and Gichki ousted Buledi as well, hence gaining complete control over Makran. Fabietti considers the factuality of some of the details mentioned in this account uncertain, although he believes that the migration of Gichki Rajputs and the struggle between them and Buledi probably had a historical basis. The Gichki now identify as Baloch.

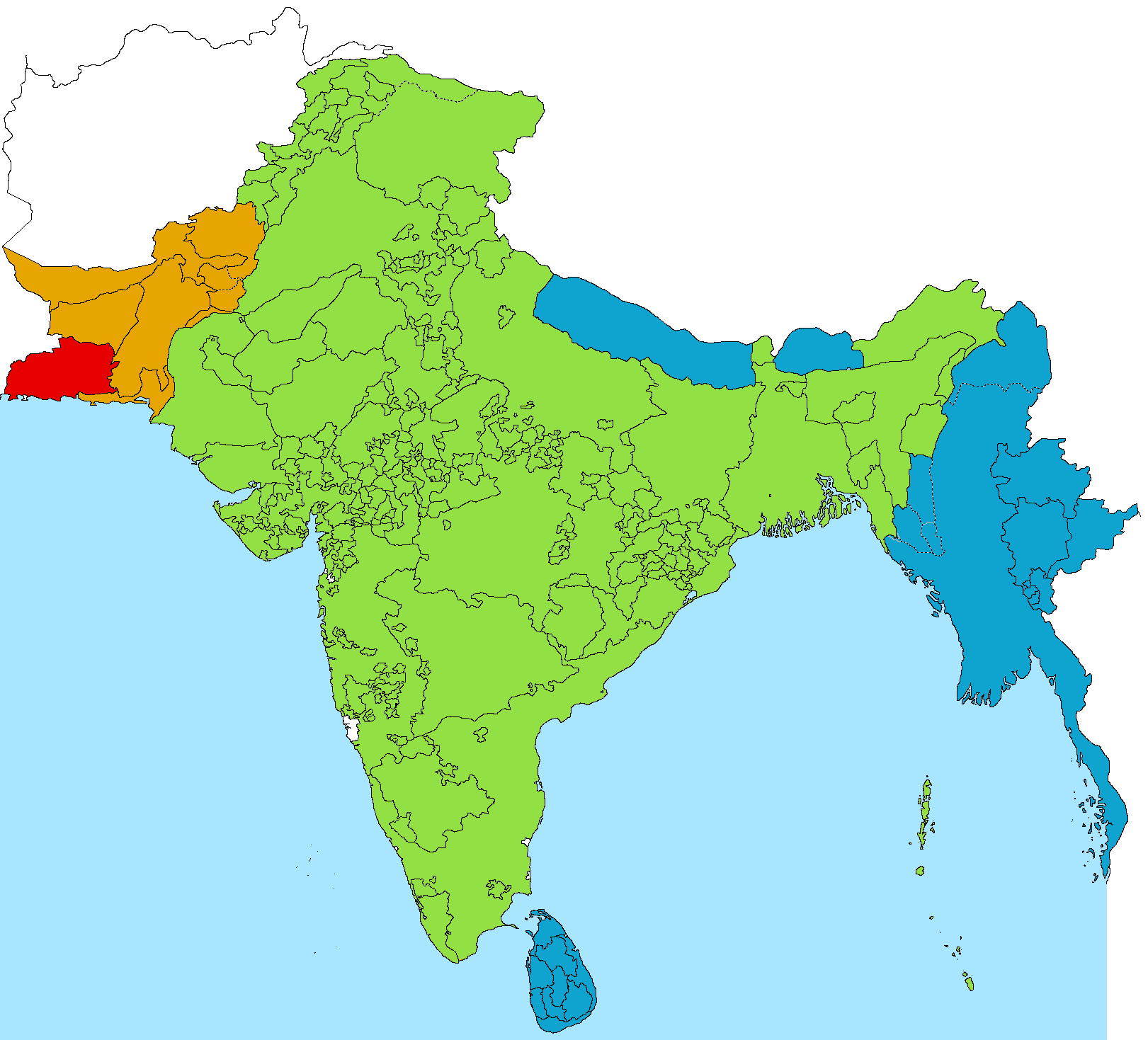
Makran in British India 1940 (in red)

Historically, Gichki appeared in Makran in the 16th century. They drove out Buledi after 1740 under their chief, Mulla Murad. Gichki were Zikris like Buledi, and Mulla Murad Gichki is considered one of the major Zikri figures. He organised Zikrism as a faith and chose Koh-e-Murad as its central pilgrimage site. During the rule of Murad's son Malik Dinar Gichki, Makran was invaded nine times by the Khan of Kalat, Nasir Khan Brahui and Gichki were forced to pay half of their revenue to him. The advent of British rule weakened the influence of Kalat, allowing Gichki Nawabs to assert their internal independence again.

=== Accession to Pakistan ===
On 21 March 1948, after the partition of India, the rulers of Makran, Kharan, and Las Bela all announced that they were ceding their states to the Dominion of Pakistan. Their rulers signed the official documents. The last Nawab, Mir Baian Gichki acceded to Pakistan in 1947.

== Society and Administration ==
The administration of the realm was subdivided between various branches. Two major branches of the Gichkis, Isazai and Dinarzai ruled Panjgur and Kech respectively. Gichki castles in Kech were surveyed by Fiorani Piacentini et al. between 1987 and 1991, who described their architecture as a blend of Rajput heritage of Gichki Nawabs and the Persian culture followed by them.

== Demographics ==
Religious groups in the Makran Division of Kalat State (British Baluchistan era)
Religious group	1911		1921		1931		1941	
Religious group	Pop.	%	Pop.	%	Pop.	%	Pop.	%
Islam	71,758	99.74%	71,625	99.67%	68,213	99.64%	86,406	99.72%
Hinduism	137	0.19%	216	0.3%	233	0.34%	206	0.24%
Christianity	40	0.06%	11	0.02%	11	0.02%	20	0.02%
Sikhism	2	0%	8	0.01%	3	0%	17	0.02%
Zoroastrianism	4	0.01%	0	0%	0	0%	1	0%
Buddhism	1	0%	0	0%	0	0%	0	0%
Judaism	0	0%	0	0%	2	0%	1	0%
Jainism	0	0%	0	0%	0	0%	0	0%
Tribal	—N/a	—N/a	—N/a	—N/a	0	0%	0	0%
Others	0	0%	0	0%	0	0%	0	0%
Total population	71,942	100%	71,860	100%	68,462	100%	86,651	100%

== See also ==
- Khanate of Kalat
- Baluchistan States Union
- Kadu Makrani, 19th century revolutionary.

== Bibliography ==
- Fiorani Piacentini, Valeria; Redaelli, Riccardo, eds. (2016) [2003]. Baluchistan: Terra Incognita. Studies in the Archaeology and History of Baluchistan. Vol. I. Oxford, England: BAR Publishing. doi:10.30861/9781841715131. ISBN 978-1-84171-513-1.
- Fabietti, Ugo (2011). Ethnography at the Frontier: Space, Memory and Society in Southern Balochistan. Peter Lang. doi:10.3726/978-3-0352-0104-8. ISBN 978-3-0352-0104-8.
- Pastner, Stephen (1978). "Conservatism and Change in a Desert Feudalism: The Case of Southern Baluchistan". In Weissleder, Wolfgang (ed.). The Nomadic Alternative: Modes and Models of Interaction in the African-Asian Deserts and Steppes. De Gruyter Mouton. pp. 247–260. doi:10.1515/9783110810233.247. ISBN 978-3-11-081023-3.
- Spooner, Brian J. (1988). "Baluchistan i. Geography, History and Ethnography". In Yarshater, Ehsan (ed.). Encyclopædia Iranica. Vol. III/6: Baḵtīārī tribe II–Banān. London and New York: Routledge & Kegan Paul. pp. 598–632. ISBN 978-0-71009-118-5.
