= Chitkan, Pakistan =

Chitkan
- Town
- Location within Balochistan, Pakistan
- Coordinates: 26.972074°N 64.088058°E
- Country: Pakistan
- Province: Balochistan
- Division: Makran
- District: Panjgur

Population (2023)
  - Total: 47,034
- Time zone: UTC+5 (PST)

Chitkan is a town of Panjgur District in the Balochistan province of Pakistan. The town is part of the Panjgur Tehsil. It’s best known as the center of key government offices, such as the Deputy Commissioner’s office, and vital contemporary and legacy educational institutions such as the Government Degree College Panjgur and the Government Model High School. The town is also home to the biggest shopping area known as Chitkan Bazaar where people from all small towns of Panjgur go for grocery shopping.

== Demographics ==
=== Population ===
The population of the city in 1998 was 21,297. According to the 2023 Census of Pakistan, the population had risen to 47,034.

Historical population
Year	Pop.	±% p.a.
1951	754	—
1961	5,670	+22.35%
1972	9,879	+5.18%
1981	9,495	−0.44%
1998	21,297	+4.87%
2017	44,613	+3.97%
2023	47,034	+0.88%

=== Languages ===
More than 99% of the population speaks Balochi.
