= Panjgur =

Pakistani town

Panjgur پنجگور (Balochi)
- City
- Location within Balochistan, Pakistan Location within Pakistan
- Coordinates: 26°58′6″N 64°6′5″E
- Country: Pakistan
- Province: Balochistan
- District: Panjgur
- Tehsil: Panjgur

Government
  - Type: Municipal Corporation
  - Mayor: Seat Vacant
  - Deputy Mayor: Seat Vacant
- Elevation: 980 m (3,220 ft)

Population (2023)
  - City: 157,693
  - Rank: 69th in Pakistan
- Time zone: UTC+5 (PST)

Panjgur (also spelled Pangor; Balochi and Urdu: پنجگور), transliterated in medieval Arabic sources as Bannajbur or Fannazbur, is a city in the eponymous tehsil and district in southwestern Balochistan, Pakistan. It is situated at an elevation of 980 metres above sea level along the Rakshan River.

== Name ==
The name is commonly explained as a compound of two Balochi words: panj (five) and goran (highland), understood as "land of five highlands". Some scholars link goran to the Avestan word gairi (mountain), a connection suggested by nearby place names such as Chokgoran ("small highland") and Mazangoran ("big highland"). An alternative derivation combines panj with goor (grave), yielding "five graves". Neither etymology has been conclusively established.

== History ==
The geographer Al-Muqaddasī, writing in 985 AD, documented Bannajbur as the capital of Makran and noted that it was inhabited by people called Balūṣh, the earliest known Arabic reference to the Baloch people.

== Settlement geography ==
Panjgur as a town comprises at least twelve villages situated in close proximity to one another on both banks of the Rakhshan River. Among the largest are Isai, Bonistan, Tasp, Chitkan, Gramkan, Khudabadan (Sarwan), Washbood, and Sordo, with Chitkan serving as a central node. The villages of Kalag, Duznap, and Erap lie approximately ten kilometres from Chitkan.

Most settlements are situated along the river, as agriculture is the principal economic activity; irrigation depends mainly on kaurjos (small channels drawing from pits dug into perennial water flows) and karezes (underground aqueducts). The remainder of the district is sparsely populated.

According to the 1981 census, the Panjgur area comprised 45 inhabited mauzas plus 3 uninhabited ones; 12 had populations exceeding 5,000, and 11 had populations between 2,000 and 4,999. The three principal modern subdivisions are Gramkān, Qila Khudābadān, and Tasp. Historically, the town was said to consist of twelve subdivisions, reflected in the designation Dwazdah Shahr-e-Panjgur ("Twelve Towns of Panjgur").

== Economy ==
Panjgur District is one of Pakistan's foremost producers of Mazafati (Muzati) dates, a premium table variety. The district has approximately 27,000 acres under Mazafati cultivation, with estimates suggesting that date production accounts for around 10% of total district revenue.

== Climate ==
Panjgur has a hot arid climate (Köppen BWh), though milder and cooler than much of the surrounding Makran region. Summers are hot and winters cool and dry. Precipitation occurs in two distinct periods: mid-winter to early spring (late December to March) and during the monsoon (June to July).

Climate data for Panjgur
| Month | Jan | Feb | Mar | Apr | May | Jun | Jul | Aug | Sep | Oct | Nov | Dec | Year |
|---|---|---|---|---|---|---|---|---|---|---|---|---|---|
| Record high °C (°F) | 26.7 (80.1) | 29.4 (84.9) | 34.5 (94.1) | 40.4 (104.7) | 44.4 (111.9) | 45.0 (113.0) | 45.0 (113.0) | 43.3 (109.9) | 41.5 (106.7) | 38.0 (100.4) | 34.0 (93.2) | 29.0 (84.2) | 45.0 (113.0) |
| Mean daily maximum °C (°F) | 18.4 (65.1) | 21.1 (70.0) | 26.4 (79.5) | 32.7 (90.9) | 37.6 (99.7) | 39.9 (103.8) | 39.6 (103.3) | 38.4 (101.1) | 35.9 (96.6) | 31.4 (88.5) | 25.4 (77.7) | 19.8 (67.6) | 30.6 (87.1) |
| Daily mean °C (°F) | 11.4 (52.5) | 14.3 (57.7) | 18.9 (66.0) | 24.9 (76.8) | 29.8 (85.6) | 32.3 (90.1) | 32.5 (90.5) | 31.0 (87.8) | 28.1 (82.6) | 23.3 (73.9) | 17.5 (63.5) | 12.7 (54.9) | 23.1 (73.6) |
| Mean daily minimum °C (°F) | 4.0 (39.2) | 6.6 (43.9) | 11.5 (52.7) | 17.2 (63.0) | 22.1 (71.8) | 24.7 (76.5) | 25.4 (77.7) | 23.6 (74.5) | 20.3 (68.5) | 15.2 (59.4) | 9.6 (49.3) | 4.8 (40.6) | 15.4 (59.7) |
| Record low °C (°F) | −6.7 (19.9) | −4.4 (24.1) | 0.0 (32.0) | 5.0 (41.0) | 5.5 (41.9) | 13.5 (56.3) | 13.9 (57.0) | 13.9 (57.0) | 8.9 (48.0) | 3.0 (37.4) | −3.3 (26.1) | −7.8 (18.0) | −7.8 (18.0) |
| Average rainfall mm (inches) | 13.6 (0.54) | 12.9 (0.51) | 15.6 (0.61) | 8.0 (0.31) | 3.5 (0.14) | 6.2 (0.24) | 6.2 (0.24) | 6.0 (0.24) | 1.4 (0.06) | 2.4 (0.09) | 3.0 (0.12) | 8.2 (0.32) | 87.0 (3.43) |
| Average rainy days (≥ 1.0 mm) | 1.6 | 1.3 | 2.5 | 0.9 | 0.6 | 0.7 | 1.2 | 0.8 | 0.2 | 0.3 | 0.3 | 0.9 | 11.3 |
| Average relative humidity (%) | 56 | 52 | 50 | 40 | 40 | 37 | 44 | 45 | 41 | 39 | 43 | 51 | 45 |
Source: NOAA (extremes 1961–1990), Deutscher Wetterdienst (humidity 1961–1995), Ogimet

== Demographics ==
Population

Historical population
| Year | Pop. | ±% p.a. |
|---|---|---|
| 1961 | 5,670 | — |
| 1972 | 9,879 | +5.18% |
| 1981 | 9,495 | −0.44% |
| 1998 | 21,297 | +4.87% |
| 2017 | 80,411 | +7.24% |
| 2023 | 157,693 | +11.88% |

According to the 2023 Pakistani census, Panjgur had a population of 157,693.

=== Languages ===
Languages of Panjgur (2023 Census)
1. Balochi (99.6%)

=== Religion ===
Religious groups in Panjgur City (1941 & 2017)
| Religious group | 1941 | | 2017 | |
| Religious group | Pop. | % | Pop. | % |
|---|---|---|---|---|
| Islam | 416 | 87.95% | 80,273 | 99.83% |
| Hinduism | 45 | 9.51% | 96 | 0.12% |
| Sikhism | 9 | 1.9% | —N/a | —N/a |
| Christianity | 3 | 0.63% | 42 | 0.05% |
| Total population | 473 | 100% | 80,411 | 100% |

== See also ==
- Panjgur Airport
- Date palm farming in Pakistan
