= Gichki =

Tribe in Pakistan and Iran

Gichki or Gitchki is a tribe living in the Makran region of Pakistan and Iran. The tribe, initially settled in the Gichk valley of Panjgur and now mostly Balochi-speaking, formed ruling class of the state of Makran from 1740 until 1955.

== Origins ==
The Gichki claimed their ancestors to be Rajputs, who appear to have arrived between the fifteenth–seventeenth centuries in Makran. Jaipur, Jodhpur, Marwar in Rajasthan, Jamnagar in Gujarat, Lahore in Punjab, and Sindh are suggested as their probable places of origin. They reportedly converted to Islam three generations after their arrival. Ethnically they are not of Baloch stock. Since they were not pastoralists unlike the Baloch or as numerous as the already settled population of Makran, some scholars consider it likely that Gichki migrated as a group of mercenaries, and conquered Makran through diplomacy and by establishing alliances with the ruling families. The historian Fiorani Piacentini believes that the close association of Gichkis with Zikrism, a local heterodox sect, also played an important role in their rise to power.

== History ==
The political turmoil in Makran during the 17th and 18th centuries attracted several bands of raiders from the neighbouring regions; among them were Buledi, Gichki, and Nausherwanis, the latter of whom were said to have originated in northeast Iran, who later established their state in Kharan. According to a locally well-known tradition from Makran, the ancestors of Gichki were forty Rajput horsemen from north; in an alliance with Buledi, Gichki killed the then ruler of Kech, a certain Malik Mirza. Soon conflict broke out between the two tribes and Gichki ousted Buledi as well, hence gaining complete control over Makran. Fabietti considers the factuality of some of the details mentioned in this account uncertain, although he believes that the migration of Gichki Rajputs and the struggle between them and Buledi probably had a historical basis.

Historically, Gichki appeared in Makran in the 16th century. They drove out Buledi after 1740 under their chief, Mulla Murad. Gichki were Zikris like Buledi, and Mulla Murad Gichki is considered one of the major Zikri figures. He organised Zikrism as a faith and chose Koh-e-Murad as its central pilgrimage site. During the rule of Murad's son Malik Dinar Gichki, Makran was invaded nine times by the Khan of Kalat, Nasir Khan Brahui and Gichki were forced to pay half of their revenue to him. The advent of British rule weakened the influence of Kalat, allowing Gichki Nawabs to assert their internal independence again. The last Nawab, Mir Baian Gichki acceded to Pakistan in 1947.

== Social organization ==
Despite their origins, Gichki are considered members of the Baloch society and speak Balochi, a trait they share with other ethnic groups of non-Baloch origins such as Jats, Lasi, Dihvar and Brahuis. Gichki are divided into two major branches, Isazai and Dinarzai, which previously ruled Panjgur and Kech respectively. They were initially Zikris, and only gradually converted to Sunni Islam after Mir Nasir Khan of Kalat undertook military campaigns against them. Gichki castles in Kech were surveyed by Fiorani Piacentini et al. between 1987 and 1991, who described their architecture as a blend of Rajput heritage of Gichki Nawabs and the Persian culture followed by them.

== Bibliography ==
- Dudoignon, Stéphane A. (2017). "History and Memory". The Baluch, Sunnism and the State in Iran: from Tribal to Global. Vol. 1. New York: Oxford University Press. pp. 33–78. doi:10.1093/oso/9780190655914.003.0002. ISBN 978-0-19-065591-4.
- Fabietti, Ugo (1992). "Power Relations in Southern Baluchistan: A Comparison of Three Ethnographic Cases". Ethnology. 31 (1). University of Pittsburgh: 89–102. doi:10.2307/3773444. ISSN 0014-1828. JSTOR 3773444.
- Fiorani Piacentini, Valeria; Redaelli, Riccardo, eds. (2016) [2003]. Baluchistan: Terra Incognita. Studies in the Archaeology and History of Baluchistan. Vol. I. Oxford, England: BAR Publishing. doi:10.30861/9781841715131. ISBN 978-1-84171-513-1.
- Fabietti, Ugo (2011). Ethnography at the Frontier: Space, Memory and Society in Southern Balochistan. Peter Lang. doi:10.3726/978-3-0352-0104-8. ISBN 978-3-0352-0104-8.
- Martin, Axmann (2019). "Baluchistan and the Baluch people". In Fleet, Kate; Krämer, Gudrun; Matringe, Denis; Nawas, John; Rowson, Everett (eds.). Encyclopaedia of Islam (3rd ed.). Brill Online. doi:10.1163/1573-3912_ei3_COM_25188. ISSN 1873-9830.
- Pastner, Stephen (1978). "Conservatism and Change in a Desert Feudalism: The Case of Southern Baluchistan". In Weissleder, Wolfgang (ed.). The Nomadic Alternative: Modes and Models of Interaction in the African-Asian Deserts and Steppes. De Gruyter Mouton. pp. 247–260. doi:10.1515/9783110810233.247. ISBN 978-3-11-081023-3.
- Spooner, Brian J. (1988). "Baluchistan i. Geography, History and Ethnography". In Yarshater, Ehsan (ed.). Encyclopædia Iranica. Vol. III/6: Baḵtīārī tribe II–Banān. London and New York: Routledge & Kegan Paul. pp. 598–632. ISBN 978-0-71009-118-5.
- Vogelsang, W. J. (1 January 1992). "The Lands of Eastern Iran". The Rise and Organisation of the Achaemenid Empire. Brill: 19–93. doi:10.1163/9789004671331_007. ISBN 978-90-04-67133-1.
- Field, Henry (1959). "An Anthropological Reconnaissance in West Pakistan, 1955". Peabody Museum of Archaeology & Ethnology. 52. Cambridge: Harvard University: 50.
- Scholz, Fred (2002). Nomadism and colonialism: a hundred years of Baluchistan; 1872 - 1972. Oxford New York: Oxford University Press. p. 27. ISBN 9780195796384.
