= Siahan Range =

Mountain range in Pakistan

Coordinates: 27°25′N 64°30′E

The Siahan Range is a mountain range in the central part of Balochistan Province of southwestern Pakistan. The Siahan Range is primarily made up of limestone and sandstone and was formed when the north western Indian Plate collided with the Eurasian Plate.

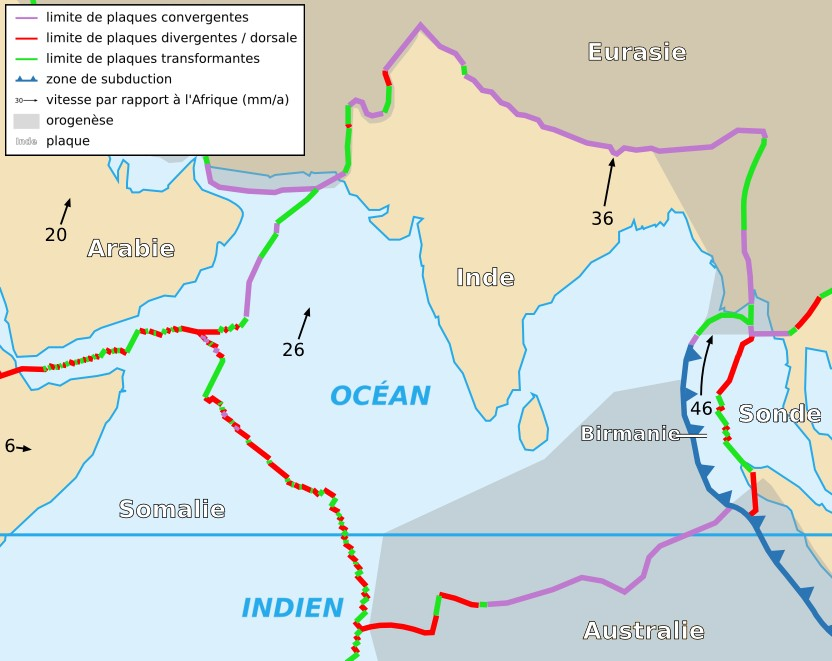
A map depicting the Indian Plate.

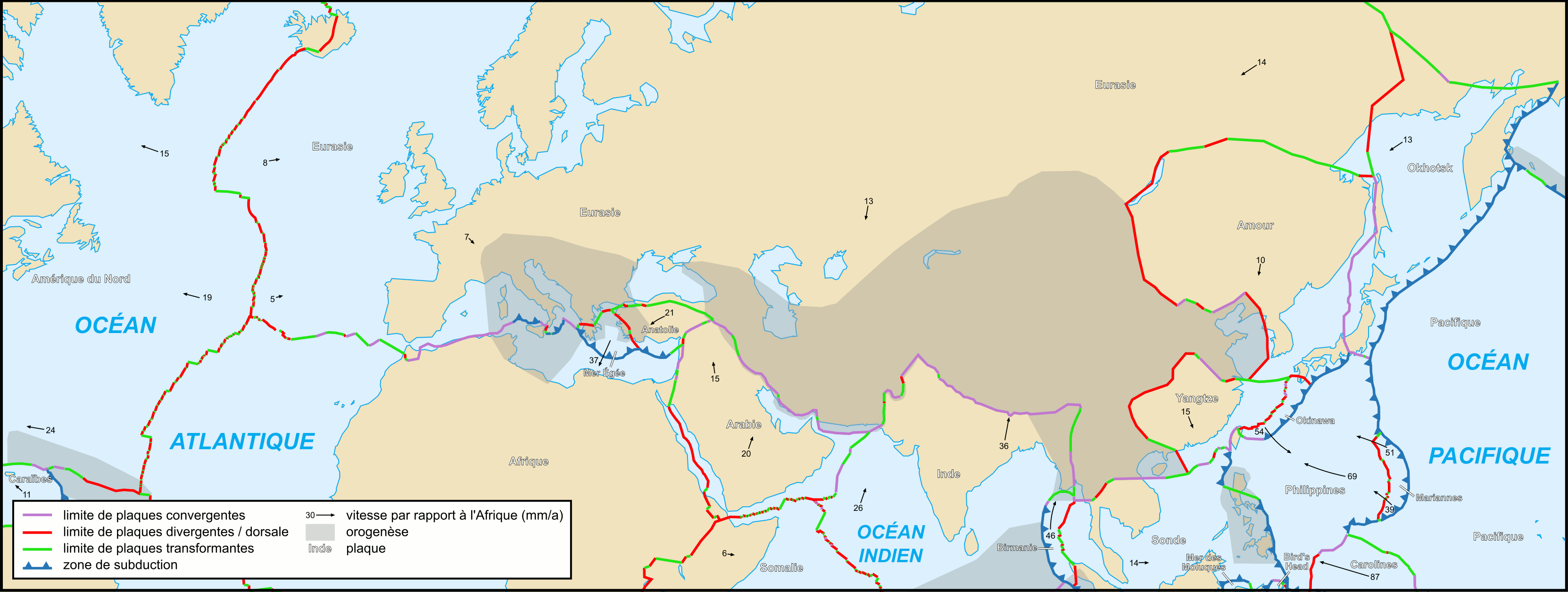
The Asian Plate, highlighted in gray.

== Geography ==
The total length of the Siahan Range from Shireza to the western frontier is about 176 miles (283 km). The highest point of the range, Razak (6,758 ft), is on the east: other peaks are Mughal Pabb (5,979 ft) and Choto-e-Jik (5,874 ft); westward the range decreases in height to about 5,000 ft.

=== Sub-ranges and ridges ===
The Siahan Range, from the term applied to the western extremity of the range, is the name which may be given to the long ridge which separate Kharan from the valley of the Rakshan River and eventually fades westward into the hills of Iranian Balochistan.

The range has never been thoroughly explored. It consists of two ridges:

- the southern one runs west-south-west from a point near Shireza
- on the north a parallel one starts from the desert east of Washuk in Kharan District and tends westward toward Dizzak in Iran, where it is known as the Siahan or the Siahan koh.

It is from this range that the name for the whole mass has been taken. It forms the main ridge at the western extremity of the mass, but at the eastern end, a more southerly range predominates.

The eastern end of the range is variously known merely as Band, or as the Kharan-Rakshan Lath, while on the west and north of Panjgur it is known as the Koh-e-Sabz. The Koh-e-Sabz is only well defined to the west of the Korkian Pass, from which place it gradually rises to a height of nearly 5400 ft before it is crossed by the defile known as the Tank-e-Grawag. On the other hand, the Kharan-Rakshan Lath descends gradually toward Jang-ja-e-gajiun in Panjgur, and forms the hilly country between the latter place and the Koh-e-Sabz. It follows, therefore, that a traveler to the Kharan plain on the north, from the part of the Rakshan basin which lies to the east of the Korkian Pass, must cross two main ridges, while immediately north of Panjgur he must traverse three, viz. the hilly country consisting of the extremity of the eastern main range and lying between Panjgur and the Koh-e-Sabz; the Koh-e-Sabz and the Siahan or Siahan Koh proper.

The northern ridge between Washuk and the valley of Palantak torrent is known as the Cher Dem in the Washuk Niabat of the Kharan District. Its height is about 5000 ft. at its western end a well known peak Hetai, which lies to the west of the Tank-e-zurrati through which the Mashkel River breaks northward to the Hamun Mashkel.

== Geology ==
Geologically, the Siahan Range has never been fully studied but its general aspect is abrupt, rugged and broken. The Koh-e-Sabz portion is composed of shale and volcanic rock, contorted in many places into fantastic shapes with synclinal and anticlinal curves.

The shale which lies throughout in perpendicular parallel layers or at a slight angle to its base, gives the hill a very sharp and jagged appearance, but though difficult they are not unscalable, very steep and precipitous escarpments being rare and generally limited to the sides. The range being on consolidated upheaval, there are no valleys ascents and descents from one ridge to another being made by following the rivulets.

== Drainage ==
The Rakshan tributary of the Mashkel River carries off all the drainage from the southern slopes. On the north a number of hill torrents descend, either to lose themselves in the Kharan Plain or to join the Mashkel River. Some of the more important are the Gujjar, the Regintak, the Gresha Kaur, the Palantak, the Pillin, the Bibi Lohri and the Barshonki.

Of the two gorges already mentioned the Tank-e-Grawag lies in the Koh-e-Sabz and the Tank-e-Zurrati in the northern ridge of the Siahan Koh. The former is so termed from the reeds called Grawag which grow here in great abundance. There is also a small patch of cultivation where a few date palms grow at the point where it makes its first turn. It is six miles in length and is easily passable when the river is low, but is subject to great and violent floods. The latter is just over eight miles long and of medium width, being nowhere less than 80 yards and generally nearly 150. The perpendicular cliffs which enclose it are about 200 feet in height. Quicksands exist at some of the fords and there is perennial water in both defiles.

== People ==
The range possesses no permanent inhabitants; among the nomads who pasture their flocks on it are the Muhammad Hasnis, Nasrois, Bullozais, Sopaks and Hajizais of the Rakshan valley and a few people from Kuhak called Siahani. Some nomads from Kharan Plain also visit it, chiefly Rikis and Kuchai Siahpad and Taghapi Rakshanis.

=== Footpaths and trails ===
The range is crossed by numerous footpaths and trails, which are used by local tribes, including the Simmij, Sabzap, Kasag, Miani, Sorani, and Sechi.

Commencing from the east the passes chiefly used by people are the Zard, to the northwest of Shireza; the Paliaz north of Nag-e-Kalat; and the Sagar-e-Kandag and Korkian passes on the road from Panjgur to Washuk. The Hetai is an important pass north of Tank-e-Grawag, on the road from Panjgur to Dehgwar in Kharan.

== Flora ==
The range is predominantly desert habitats. Many of the seasonally torrential river channels contain Tamarix, and some Asafoetida. The date palm (Phoenix dactylifera) flourishes in oasis and irrigated locations.
