= Frederic John Goldsmid =

Sir Frederic John Goldsmid
- Frederic John Goldsmid in 1878
- Born: 19 May 1818; Milan, Kingdom of Lombardy–Venetia, Austria
- Died: 12 January 1908 (aged 89); Brook Green, Hammersmith, London, England
- Military career
- Allegiance: United Kingdom
- Branch: British Indian Army
- Rank: Major General
- Conflicts: First Opium War; Crimean War
- Awards: Knight Commander of the Order of the Star of India; Companion of the Order of the Bath

Major-General Sir Frederic John Goldsmid KCSI, CB (19 May 1818 – 12 January 1908) was an officer in British Army and East India Company, who also served the British government in various roles through the Middle East.

== Life and career ==
Goldsmid was born in Milan, Italy (but at that time and until 1859, Milan was an Austrian city) in May 1818, the only son of Eliza Frances (née Campbell) and Lionel Prager Goldsmid, an officer in the 19th Dragoons, and a scion of the well-known London family of that name. His maternal grandmother's father was Revolutionary War aide-de-camp David Franks. Sir Frederic, after completing his education in Paris, King's College School, and King's College London, entered the Madras army in the year 1839, when the first Afghan war was in progress, but he was not among those who fought in that campaign. Before he had been twelve months at Madras his regiment was ordered to proceed to China, and he took part in the actions at Canton and along the coast which preceded the Treaty of Nanking, receiving the Chinese war medal. While this campaign was in progress he was appointed the adjutant of his regiment; and it was then that he turned is attention to the study of Asiatic languages, in which he afterwards became so proficient.

In 1845 Goldsmid was appointed interpreter for Hindustani, the lingua franca of the native army of India; but in the following year ill-health compelled his return to England on medical certificate. He did not remain idle, however, and during the two years of his home residence he served as orderly officer at Addiscombe Military Seminary. In 1848 he returned to India, and, having passed high examinations in those subjects, was appointed in 1849 interpreter for Persian and in 1851 for Arabic, an unusual combination. During this period he obtained his company, and was Assistant Adjutant-General of the Nagpur Province subsidiary force. In Scinde he formed one of the fine band of officers gathered round him by that remarkable soldier and administrator, General John Jacob, who was the true founder of the "forward" school among Indian frontier politicians. In 1855 he had again to leave India on medical certificate; but his holiday was brief, as, recruited by the voyage, he requested to be employed on active service in the Crimea, and was at once attached as A.A.G. to Sir Robert Vivian's force, consisting of Turks in the pay of the British. He passed an examination in Turkish, and was made President of the Local Examining Committee at Kertch, received the Turkish war medal, 4th class Medjidie, and Brevet rank of Major in the Army.

In 1856 he returned to India and took up judicial work at Shikarpur, subsequently resuming the inquiry into alienated lands, and was attached to the staff of Sir Bartle Frere, then Chief Commissioner of Scinde. In this capacity he showed much tact and energy, and when it was decided to establish overland telegraphic communication from Europe through Persia and Baluchistan to India, Colonel Goldsmid was at once selected as the man best fitted to superintend the task.

From 1865 to 1870 he held the post of Government director of the Indo-European Telegraph Company, and during those six years he personally superintended the erection of the poles and the carrying of the wires across the whole extent of the Shah's kingdom. Of that arduous work he gave an interesting and modest account in his volume entitled "Telegraph and Travel," rendering full justice to the efforts of his assistants and saying little or nothing of his own. In 1866, on the completion of the first stage of his work, he received a Companionship of the Bath and the thanks of the Government of India, and in 1871, when the work was all done, a Knight Commandership of the Star of India. In 1871 he acted as British Commissioner for the delimitation of the Baluch frontier with Persia, and in the following year he was entrusted with the more difficult task of arranging the Selstan frontier between Afghanistan and Persia. It was difficult to satisfy both sides, and Sir Frederic Goldsmid's award did not satisfy the Shah, while he gave undoubted umbrage to the Ammer Shere Ali. The Selstan business was afterwards alleged to be the first cause of that Afghan ruler's taking umbrage at our policy; but its effect was probably exaggerated, although Yakub Khan, in his summary of his father's policy, makes it the starting-point of his alienation from the side of England. Sir Frederic returned to England after his Persian mission and devoted himself to the preparation of his voluminous report on Eastern Persia and to other literary work. From his knowledge of Persia and of the events that led up to the Mutiny, which has been first predicted by his old chief, John Jacob, Sir Frederic Goldsmid was entrusted with the execution of the Life of Sir James Outram, the Bayard of India, a work that met with considerable success.

In 1877 he was appointed British representative of an international commission to inquire into the whole matter of coolie emigration, and again received the acknowledgments of the Government of India, in which the Secretary of State "entirely concurred." In 1880 Sir Frederic was appointed British Controller of the Daira Sanya, and held the post for three years. During this period occurred the Arabi rebellion, and during the war Sir Frederic organised a local intelligence department at Alexandria, which rendered useful service until the surrender of Arabi after Tel-el-Kebir. In 1883 he left Egypt and accepted a mission from the King of the Belgians to the Congo that would have led to a permanent command in that region but for the complete breakdown of his health, which compelled him to return to England. The special object of this mission was to test the validity of about 300 treaties concluded with chief of the Congo Basin. The may be termed his last appearance in a public capacity, and he devoted his attention during the last years of his life to literary work, much of which consisted of anonymous contributions to newspapers, reviews and work of reference like the Encyclopædia Britannica. In this sphere he gained the reputation of being a laborious and conscientious writer, and his natural temperament was that of a literary and scientific student rather than of a soldier and man of action. He was for many years a most interested member of the committee of the Gordon Boys' Home, and until the last had taken a keen interest in the Archbishop's Mission to Assyrian Christians, of which was one of the original promoters.

He married, in 1849, Mary, eldest daughter of Lieutenant-General Mackenzie Steuart, who died in 1900, and by whom he had two sons and four daughters.

== See also ==
- Goldsmid family
