= Buledi =

The Buledi or Buleidi (Balochi: بلیدی) is a Baloch tribe in the Pakistani provinces of Sindh and Balochistan. The tribe derives its name from the Buleda valley in Kech. the Bulediare listed among the major tribes of the Kacchi region.

== History ==
Buledi descend from a certain Bu Said or Buledi, whom they claim to have come in the 18th century from Oman in the southern Arabian Peninsula. However, according to the Italian anthropologist Ugo Fabietti it is possible that in reality the Buledi tribe came from the Helmand region of Afghanistan. For a time, Buledi ruled Kech with the support of Nader Shah of Persia. However, they lost Kech to the Gichkis after a power struggle in the 18th century, and whole eastern Makran came under control of the Gichkis.
