= Makran =

Semi-desert coastal region in Iran and Pakistan

Coordinates: 25.30541°N 60.64108°E

Makran (Balochi, Persian and Urdu: مکران), also written as Mecran and Mokrān, is a semi-desert coastal strip in Pakistan and in Iran, along the coast of the Gulf of Oman. It is the southern coastal region of Balochistan, and extends westwards, from the Sonmiani Bay in Balochistan province of Pakistan to the northwest of Karachi in the east, to the fringes of the region of Bashkardia or Bāšgerd in the southern part of the Sistan and Baluchestan province of Iran. Makrān is thus bisected by the modern political boundary between Pakistan and Iran.

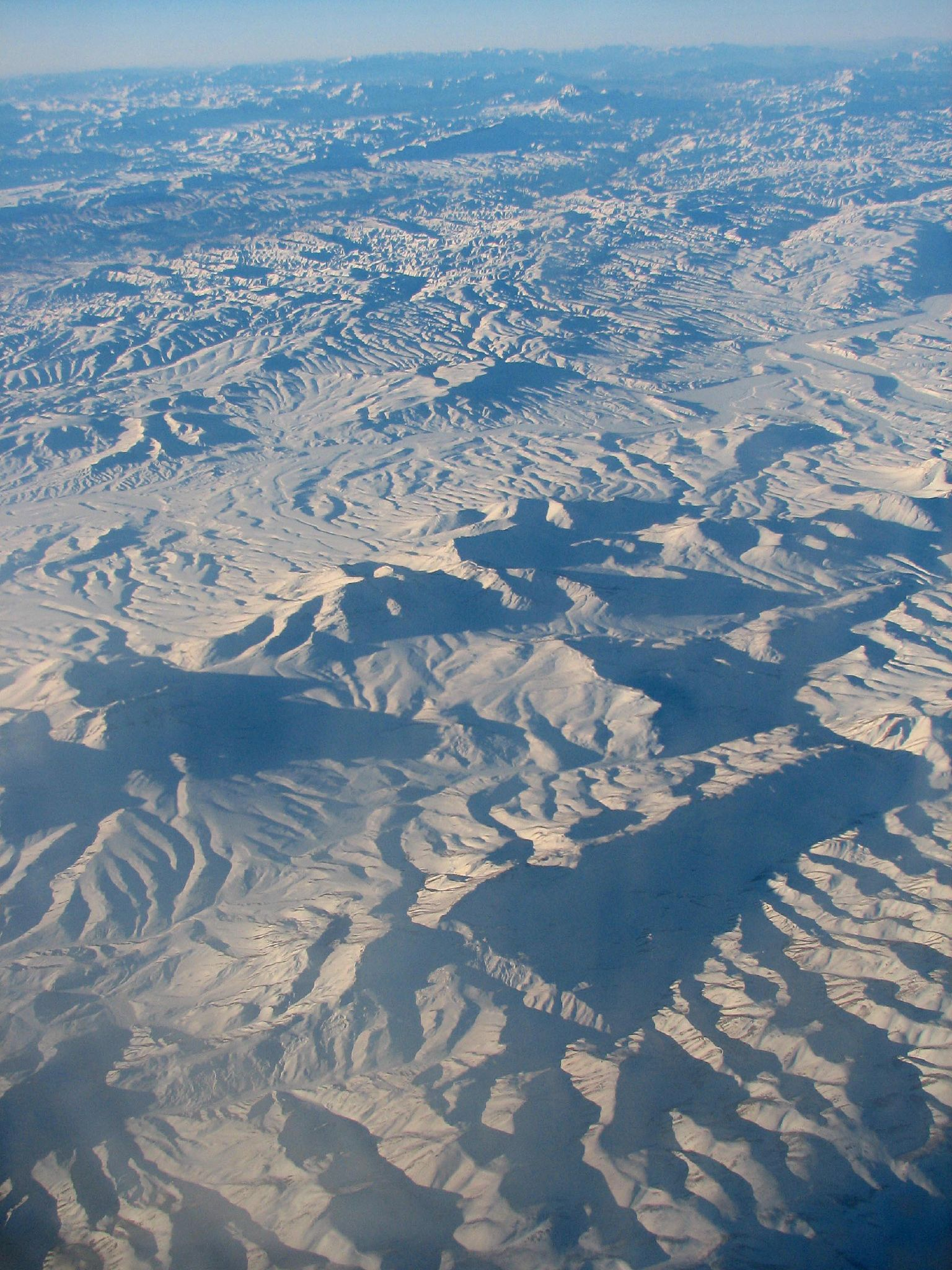
The Central Makran Range in Pakistan and Iran

== Etymology ==
The southern part of Balochistan is called Kech Makran on the Pakistani side and Makran on the Iranian side, which is also the name of a former Iranian province. The location corresponds to that of the Maka satrapy in Achaemenid times. The Sumerian trading partners of Magan are identified with Makran. In Varahamihira's Brihat Samhita, there is a mention of a tribe called Makara (Sanskrit: मकर, romanized: makara, lit. 'fish') inhabiting the lands west of India. Arrian used the term Ichthyophagoi (Ancient Greek: Ἰχθυοφάγοι, romanized: Ĭkhthŭophắgoi, lit. 'fish-eaters, piscivores') for inhabitants of coastal areas (which has led to a suggestion to derive Makran from the term in Modern Persian: مَاهِی خورَان, romanized: māhī xōrān, lit. 'fish-eaters, piscivores').

== History ==
=== Earliest settlements ===
The Kech-Makran region in southwestern Pakistan, along Kech River, was inhabited as early as the 5th millennium BCE. The site of Miri Qalat was investigated by Pakistani and French archaeologists from 1987 to 2007. Later, the site of Shahi-Tump, near Turbat, was also studied.

Large and massive quadrangular stone building were constructed already before 4000 BCE. Flints, worked stones, and bone tools used by the inhabitants were found by archaeologists, but no ceramics were yet used. In this Period I the inhabitants of the Kech River Valley already cultivated wheat and barley, as well as lentils. They had domesticated cattle, goats, and sheep. They also caught fish from the Oman Sea. During Period II, the building of massive architectural structures continued, and a quadrangular stone complex was built. Later, mud brick constructions also appear on top of some of these stone buildings.

At Miri Qalat, some links with Uruk culture ceramics were also found. The related site of Balakot, Makran, going back to 3500 BCE, was also studied by archaeologists.

Between 2500 BCE and 1700 BCE, a maritime trade route existed in the Indian Ocean and the Persian Gulf connecting three primary regions as described in ancient Sumerian inscriptions found in Iraq: Meluhha, Magan, and Dilmun.

=== Ancient ===
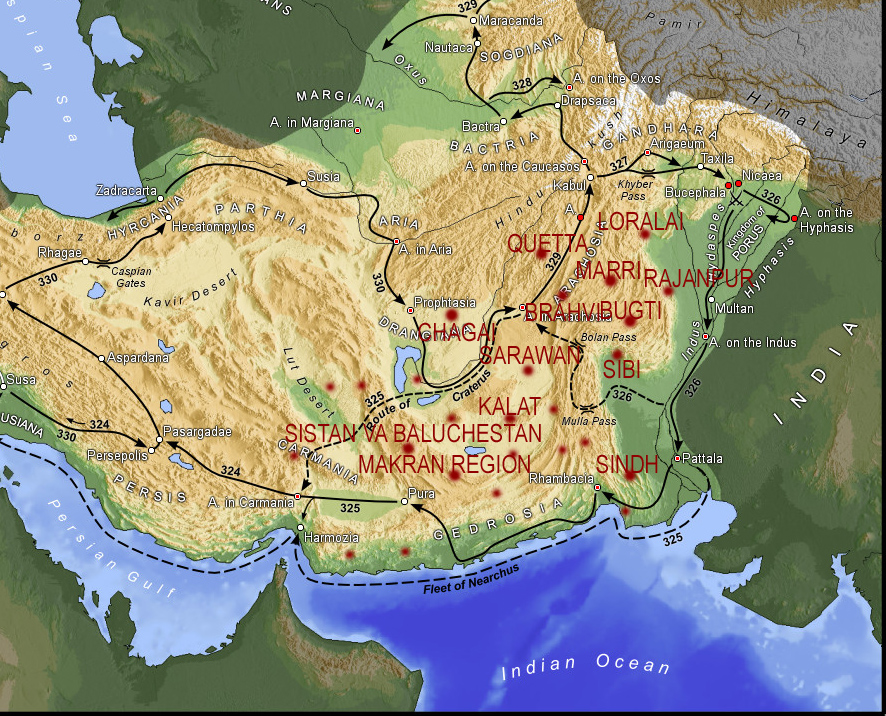
Paths that Alexander the Great took

Under the Achaemenid Empire, the region was known to Greeks as Gedrosia and was probably organised as the satrapy of Maka. According to Arrian, Cyrus the Great lost most of his army during the Gedrosian campaign, and later Alexander the Great too returned from his campaigns in Punjab through Gedrosia. After the victory of the Mauryan Empire against the Greeks in the Seleucid–Mauryan War, Makran came under the rule of Chandragupta Maurya. Chandragupta and Seleucus I Nicator made a peace settlement in 304 BCE. Seleucus ceded the satrapies, including Gedrosia, to the Mauryans. The alliance was solidified with a marriage alliance. The outcome of the arrangement proved to be mutually beneficial. The border between the Seleucid and Mauryan empires remained stable in subsequent generations, and friendly diplomatic relations are reflected by the ambassador Megasthenes, and by the envoys sent westward by Chandragupta's grandson Ashoka.

==== Sasanian Empire ====
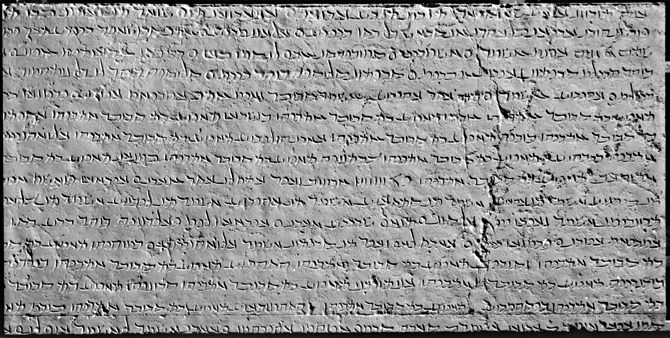
Parthian version of the Shapur I inscription at Ka'ba-ye Zartosht.

Shapur I's trilingual inscription at the Ka'ba-ye Zartosht in Naqsh-i-Rustam, dated to 262 CE, notes "Makuran"/"Makran" to be one of the many provinces of the Sasanian Empire:

And I (Shapur I) possess the lands: Fars [Persis], Pahlav [Parthia] ... and all of Abarshahr (all the upper (eastern, Parthian) provinces), Kerman, Sakastan, Turgistan, Makuran, Pardan [Paradene], Hind [Sind] and Kushanshahr all the way to Pashkibur [Peshawar?] and to the borders of Kashgaria, Sogdia and Chach [Tashkent] and of that sea-coast Mazonshahr [Oman].

— Shapur I's inscription at the Ka'ba-ye Zartosht (262 CE), translation by Josef Wiesehöfer (1996).

=== Medieval ===
Approximate location of the Sasanian Province of Makran and contemporary South Asian polities, circa 350 CE.

Abū Rayḥān Muḥammad ibn Aḥmad al-Bīrūnī states in his book Kitab al-Hind that the coast of India begins with Tiz, the capital of Makran.

According to historian André Wink:

Further evidence in the Chachnama makes perfectly clear that many areas of Makran had a largely Buddhist population. When Chach marched to Armabil, this town is described as having been in the hands of a Buddhist Samani (Samani Budda), a descendant of the agents of Rai Sahiras who had been elevated for their loyalty and devotion, but who later made themselves independent. The Buddhist chief offered his allegiance to Chach when the latter was on his way to Kirman in 631. The same chiefdom of Armadil is referred to by Hiuen Tsang O-tien-p-o-chi-lo, located at the high road running through Makran, and he also describes it as predominantly Buddhist, thinly populated though it was, it had no less than 80 Buddhist convents with about 5000 monks. In effect at eighteen km northwest of Las Bela at Gandakahar, near the ruins of an ancient town are the caves of Gondrani, and as their constructions show these caves were undoubtedly Buddhist. Traveling through the Kij valley further west (then under the government of Persia) Hiuen Tsang saw some 100 Buddhist monasteries and 6000 priests. He also saw several hundred Deva temples in this part of Makran, and in the town of Su-nu li-chi-shi-fa-lo – which is probably Qasrqand – he saw a temple of Maheshvara Deva, richly adorned and sculptured. There is thus very wide extension of Indian cultural forms in Makran in the seventh century, even in the period when it fell under Persian sovereignty. By comparison in more recent times the last place of Hindu pilgrimage in Makran was Hinglaj, 256 km west of present-day Karachi in Las Bela.

Wink has recorded Hiuen Tsang's notes on the language and script in use in easternmost Makran (eastern parts of Pakistani Balochistan):

Hiuen Tsang considered the script which was in use in Makran to be "much the same as India", but the spoken language "differed a little from that of India".

The Hindu Sewa dynasty ruled much of Baluchistan up until the 7th century CE. The Sibi Division derives its name from Rani Sewi, the queen of the Sewa dynasty. Makran was under the Chach dynasty of Sindh until the 7th-century CE. Jats, known to Arabs as Zuṭṭ, had a significant population in Makran at the time.

==== Islamic conquest ====
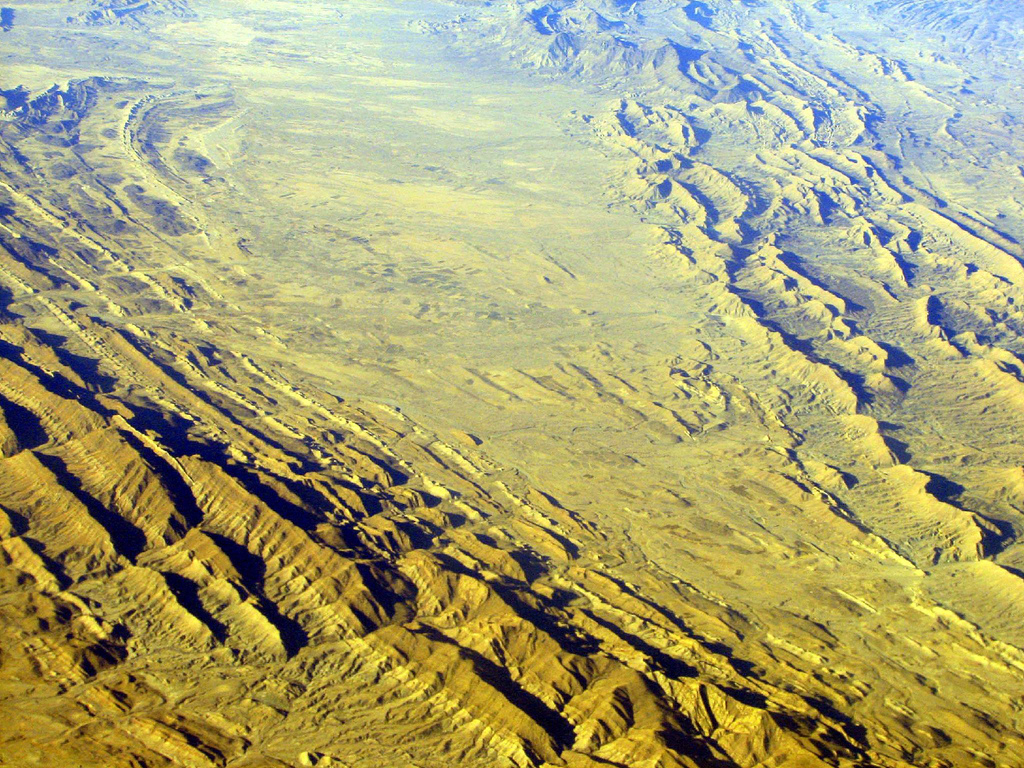
Central Makran range

The first Islamic conquest of Makran took place during the Rashidun Caliphate in the year 643 CE. Caliph Umar's governor of Bahrain, Uthman ibn Abi al-As, who was on a campaign to conquer the southern coastal areas beyond Sassanids, sent his brother Hakam ibn Abu al-Aas to raid and reconnoitre the Makran region.

In late 644 CE Caliph Umar dispatched an army under the command of Hakam ibn Amr for the wholesale invasion of Makran. He was joined by reinforcements from Kufa under the command of Shahab ibn Makharaq, and by Abdullah ibn Utban, the commander of a campaign in Kerman. They encountered no strong resistance in Makran until the army of the King of Sind, along with contingents from Makran and Sind, stopped them near the Indus River. In mid-644 the Battle of Makran was fought between the forces of the Rashidun Caliphate and the Rai of Sind; the Raja's forces were defeated and forced to retreat to the eastern bank of the Indus. The Raja's army had included war elephants, but these had posed little problem for the Muslim invaders, who had dealt with them during the conquest of Persia. In accordance with the orders of Caliph Umar, the captured war elephants were sold in Islamic Persia, with the proceeds distributed among the soldiers as share in booty. In response to Caliph Umar's questions about the Makran region, the messenger from Makran who brought the news of the victory told him:

O Commander of the faithful!
It's a land where the plains are stony;
Where water is scanty;
Where the fruits are unsavory;
Where men are known for treachery;
Where plenty is unknown;
Where virtue is held of little account;
And where evil is dominant.
A large army is less for there;
And a less army is use less there;
The land beyond it, is even worse

Umar looked at the messenger and said: "Are you a messenger or a poet?" He replied, "Messenger". Thereupon Caliph Umar instructed Hakim bin Amr al-Taghlabi that for the time being Makran should be the easternmost frontier of the Islamic empire, and that no further attempt should be made to extend the conquests.

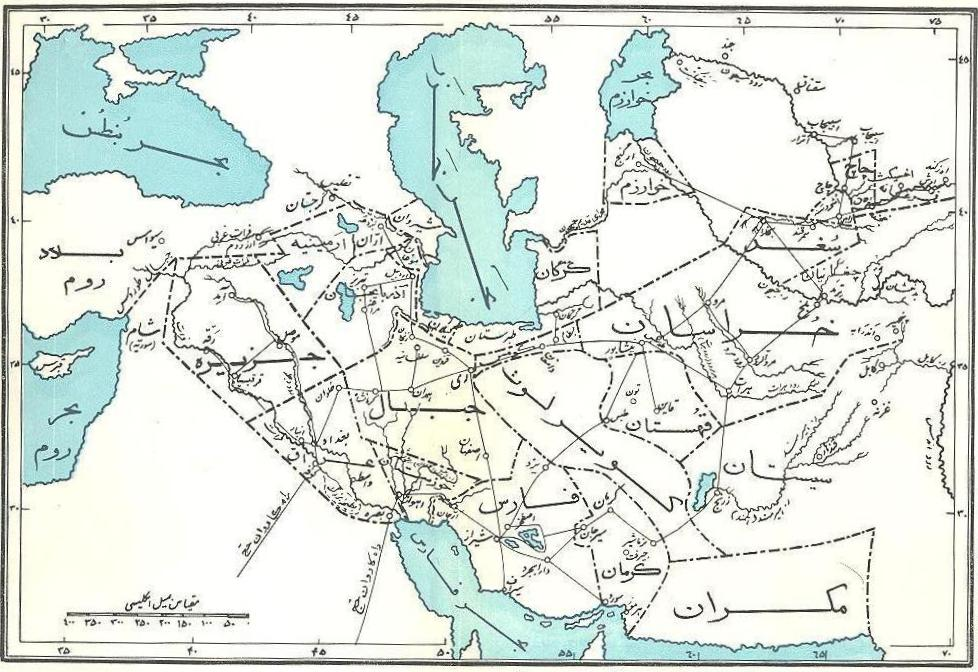
Map showing Makran's location during the time of the Abbasid Caliphate, from the book of historical geography of the lands of the Eastern Caliphate. ^{cite?} For non-readers of Arabic, the region is the large quadrilateral near the bottom right of the image

Before 971 CE, the Persian Makran was effectively governed by local Baloch and Kufeci tribal chieftains. In that year, the Buyid military commander Abed ibn ali captured the coastal town of Tis and adjacent areas.

==== Ma'danid dynasty ====
The Ma'danid dynasty was a medieval Islamic dynasty that ruled Makran from the late 9th or early 10th century until around the 11th century.

=== Modern ===
Mahmud of Ghazni, and later Ghurids, undertook campaigns in Makran region, but after the death of Muhammad of Ghur in 1206, the Sultanate of Makran became independent. Makran, with its capital at Kech, became a prosperous region, with its maritime trade reaching as far as modern Indonesia. Marco Polo in the 13th and the Ottoman admiral Seydi Ali Reis in the 16th century referred to Kech-Makran as an independent kingdom. The Malik dynasty survived until early 17th century, when it was overthrown by Buledi and Gichki tribes. Zikrism started to become dominant sect in Makran during this period.

==== Princely state of Makran ====
Makran (Urdu: ریاست مکران) was an autonomous princely state in a subsidiary alliance with British Raj until 1947, before acceding to Pakistan as a princely state of Pakistan. It was ruled by Gichki Nawabs, who were of Rajput origin. Their ancestor, Jagat Singh had migrated from Rajputana in the 17th century and converted to Islam. It ceased to exist in 1955. It was located in the extreme southwest of present-day Pakistan, an area now parts of the districts of Gwadar, Kech and Panjgur. The state did not include the enclave of Omani Gwadar, which was under Omani rule until 1958. On the independence of Pakistan, Makran became a district within the province of Balochistan, with the exception of an area of 800 km^{2} (310 sq mi) around Gwadar. In 1958 the Gwadar enclave was transferred to Pakistani control as part of the district of Makran. The entire region has been subdivided into new smaller districts of Makran Division over the years.

In January 2025, a government spokesperson informed that Iran is investigating the possibility of moving its capital to the Makran region.

== Geography ==
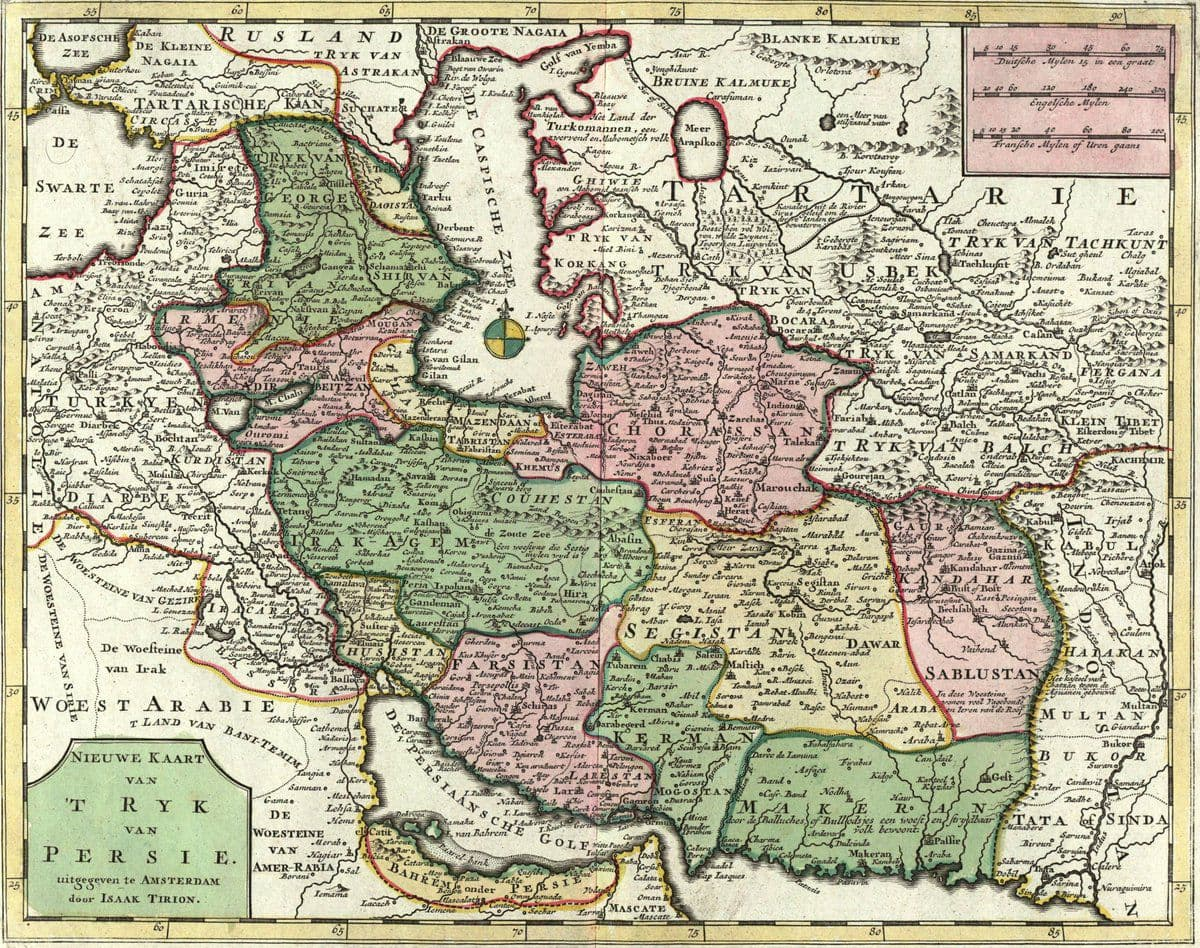
Makran in a 1744 map created in Amsterdam

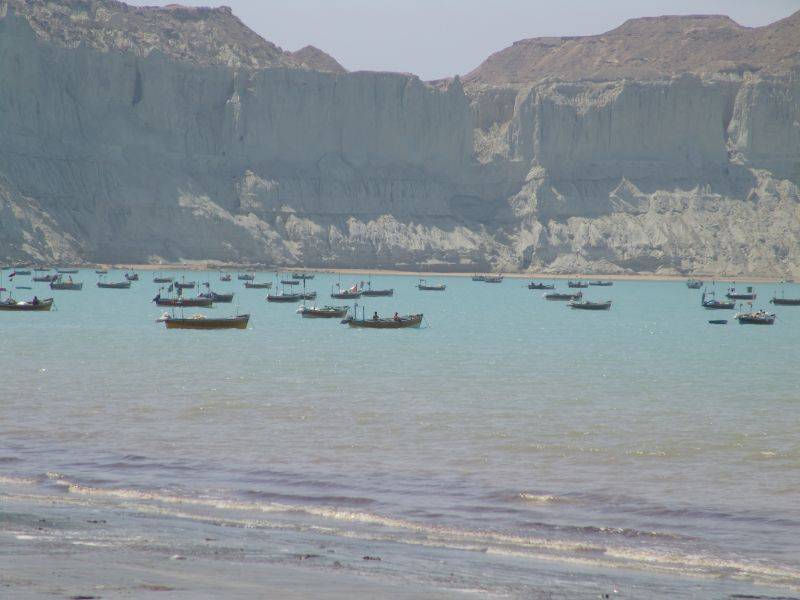
The coast of Gwadar in Makran region

The narrow coastal plain rises rapidly into several mountain ranges. Of the 1,000 km (620 mi) coastline, around 750 km (470 mi) are in Pakistan. The climate is dry with little rainfall. Makran is very sparsely inhabited, with much of the population concentrated in a string of small ports including Chabahar, Gwatar, Jiwani, Jask, Sirik, Gwadar (not to be confused with Gwatar), Pasni, Ormara and many smaller fishing villages.

The Makran Division in Pakistan.

There is only one island off the coast of Makran, Astola Island, near Pasni, although there are several small islets. The coastline has a number of lagoons and bays. The main lagoons are Miani Hor, Khor Kalmat, and the Jiwani Coastal Wetland. The main bays are from east to west: Ormara East Bay, Ormara West Bay, Pasni Bay, Surbandar Bay, Gwadar East Bay, Gwadar West Bay and Gwatar Bay (which includes Jiwani Bay). This latter bay shelters a large mangrove forest and the nesting grounds of endangered turtle species. The Mirani Dam provides irrigation, flood prevention and water supply to Gwadar city.

== Demographics ==
Religious groups in the Makran Division of Kalat State (British Baluchistan era)
Religious group	1911		1921		1931		1941	
Religious group	Pop.	%	Pop.	%	Pop.	%	Pop.	%
Islam	71,758	99.74%	71,625	99.67%	68,213	99.64%	86,406	99.72%
Hinduism	137	0.19%	216	0.3%	233	0.34%	206	0.24%
Christianity	40	0.06%	11	0.02%	11	0.02%	20	0.02%
Sikhism	2	0%	8	0.01%	3	0%	17	0.02%
Others	5 (Note: Including 4 Parsis (Zoroastrians) and 1 Buddhist.)	0.01%	0	0%	2 (Note: Including 2 Jews.)	0%	2 (Note: Including 1 Parsi (Zoroastrian) and 1 Jew.)	0%
Total population	71,942	100%	71,860	100%	68,462	100%	86,651	100%

== See also ==
- Chabahar
- Gwadar
- Khor Kalmat
- Lyari Town
- Makran Coastal Highway
- Makran Coastal Range
- Makran Division
- N'aschi
- Sokhta Koh
- State of Makran
- Makrana City of Makrana, India, Famous for Makrana Marble named after Makran region
- Wildlife of Pakistan § Western highlands, plains and deserts
- 1945 Balochistan earthquake
