= Rudi, Iran =

Rudi (Persian: رودي or رودي) in Iran may refer to:

- Rudi, Kerman (رودي)
- Rudi, Sistan and Baluchestan (رودي)
- Rudi, Chabahar (رودي), Sistan and Baluchestan Province
- Rudi-ye Bala, Sistan and Baluchestan Province

== See also ==
- Rudy, Iran
