= Rudik =

Rudik (Persian: روديک or روديك), also rendered as Rudig, may refer to:

- Rudik-e Karim Bakhsh
- Rudik-e Mahmud-e Pain
- Rudik-e Molladad
- Rudik-e Sahebdad
- Vroutek (German: Rudig) a town in the Czech Republic
