= Kostenko =

Kostenko (Ukrainian: Костенко) is a Ukrainian surname. It is a surname of patronymic derivation, based on the name of Kost (Кость), Kostyantyn (Костянтин) or 'Constantine (name)' and literally meaning "child of Kost". It may refer to the following notable people:

- Aleksei Kostenko (born 1984), Russian footballer
- Andrzej Kostenko (born 1936), Polish filmmaker
- Ekaterina Kostenko (born 1984), Ukrainian pair skater
- Elena Kostenko (1926–2019), Soviet Russian painter
- Fyodor Kostenko (1896–1942), Soviet WWII army commander
- Ihor Kostenko (1991–2014), Ukrainian journalist and student
- Konstantin Kostenko (1939–2004), Soviet sprint canoeist
- Kyrylo Kostenko (born 1998), Ukrainian footballer
- Lina Kostenko (born 1930), Ukrainian poet and writer
- Natalya Kostenko (born 1980), Russian politician
- Olga Kostenko (born 1984), Russian sprint canoeist
- Petr Kostenko (born 1976), Kazakhstani chess Grandmaster
- Vladimir Kostenko (1903–1967), Ukrainian-American ballet dancer
- Yan Kostenko (born 2003), Ukrainian footballer
- Yurii V. Kostenko (born 1945), Ukrainian diplomat
- Yuriy Kostenko (born 1951), Ukrainian politician

== See also ==
- Kostenik
- Kostenki
- Kostenko mine disaster
