= Rudi =

Rudi may refer to:

== People and fictional characters ==
- Rudi (name), a given name, nickname and surname; includes a list of people and fictional characters with the name
- Rudi (spiritual teacher) (1928–1973), American spiritual teacher
- Rudi (footballer), Indonesian footballer

== Places ==
- Rudi (Tanzanian ward)
- Rudi, Iran (disambiguation)
- Rudi, Soroca, a commune in Soroca district, Moldova
- Rudi (river), a tributary of the Pârâul Galben in Gorj County, Romania

== Other uses ==
- Rudi (band), a punk rock band
- SS Rudi, a Hansa A Type cargo ship
- Revision using distal inflow (RUDI)

== See also ==
- Rudy (disambiguation)
- Rüedi
- Ruedi (disambiguation)
