= Rüedi =

Rüedi is a surname. Notable people with the surname include:

- Andreas Rüedi (1931–2008), Swiss skier
- Beat Rüedi (1920–2009), Swiss ice hockey player
- Carl Rüedi (1848–1901), Swiss pulmonologist
- Lisa Rüedi (born 2000), Swiss ice hockey player
- Lucius Rüedi (died 1870), Swiss pulmonologist
- Luzius Rüedi (1900–1993), Swiss ice hockey player
- Marcel Rüedi (1938-1986), Swiss mountaineer
- Yves Rüedi (born 1976), Swiss judge

== See also ==
- Rudi (disambiguation)
- Ruedi (disambiguation)
- Rudy (disambiguation)
