= Rudy (disambiguation) =

Rudy is a masculine given name, a nickname and a surname.

Rudy may also refer to:

== Places ==
=== Poland ===
- Rudy, Silesian Voivodeship, a village
- Rudy Landscape Park, Silesian Voivodeship
- Rudy, Lublin Voivodeship, a village
- Rudy, Krotoszyn County, Greater Poland Voivodeship, a village
- Rudy, Słupca County, Greater Poland Voivodeship, a village

=== Elsewhere ===
- Rudy, Iran, a village
- Rudy, Arkansas, United States, a town
- Rural Municipality of Rudy No. 284, Saskatchewan, Canada

== Arts and entertainment ==
- Rudy (film), a 1993 sports drama
- Rudy: The Rudy Giuliani Story, a 2003 biopic
- Rudy, a comic strip by William Overgard
- Rudy, a tank in the Polish TV series Czterej pancerni i pies
- "Rudy" (Cher song), by Cher from I Paralyze, 1982
- "Rudy", a song from the album Crime of the Century by Supertramp

== Other uses ==
- Rudy (footballer), Angolan footballer Carlos Wilson Cachicote da Rocha (born 1989)
- Rudy Mas'ud (born 1981), an Indonesian businessman and politician who served as Governor of East Kalimantan for the 2025–2030 period.
- Rudy Choirudin (born 1964), an Indonesian chef
- Rude boy, also known as rudie, rudi or rudy, a subculture originating in Jamaica
- R-U-Dead-Yet? (RUDY), a technique in internet denial-of-service attacks

== See also ==
- Rudi (disambiguation)
- Rüedi
- Ruedi (disambiguation)
- Rudolph (disambiguation)
