= Pârâul Galben =

Pârâul Galben Galbenu
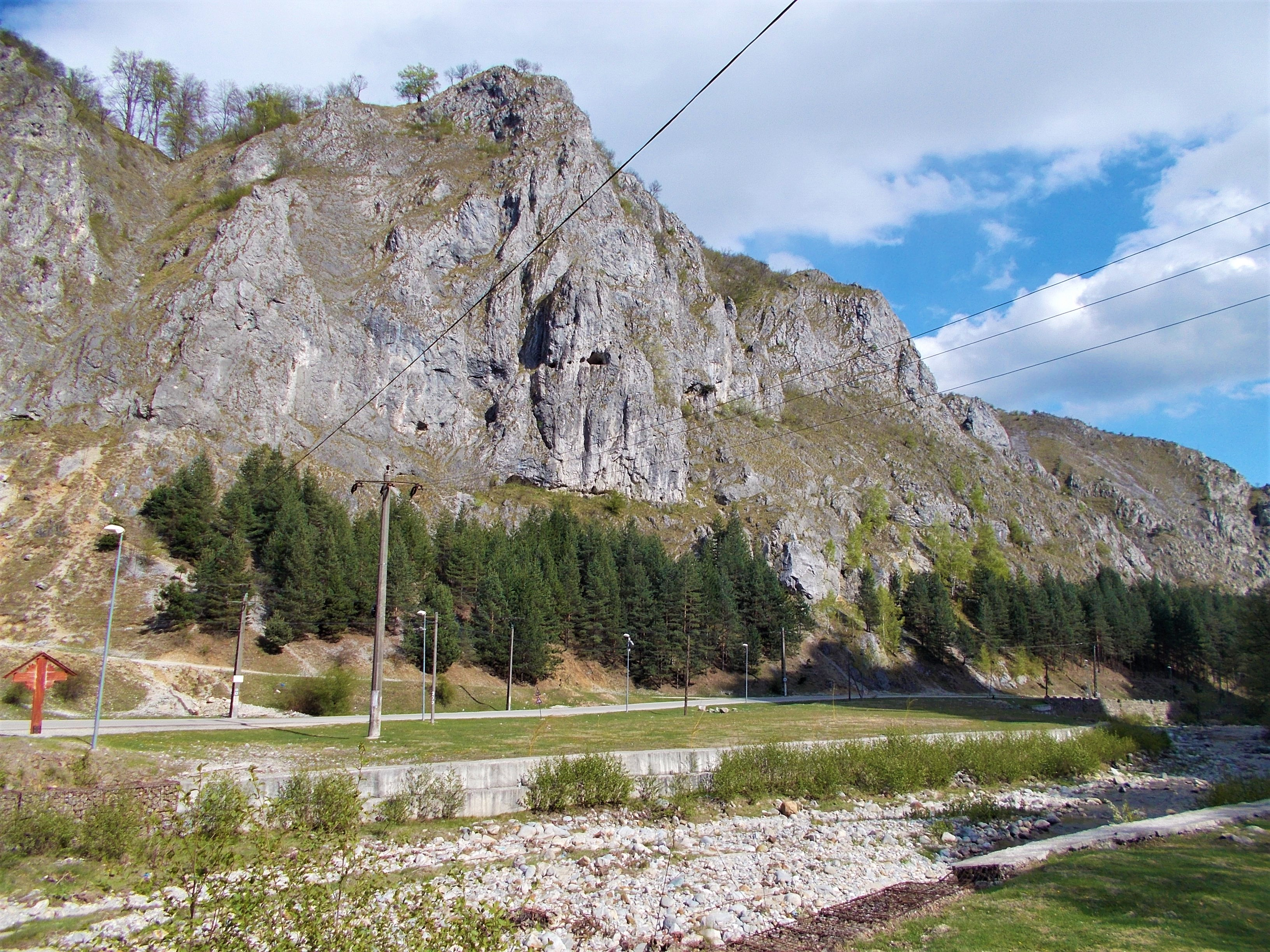

- Location within Romania

Location
- Country: Romania
- Counties: Gorj County
- Villages: Baia de Fier, Bumbești-Pițic

Physical characteristics
- Mouth: Gilort
  - location: Bălcești
  - coordinates: 45.1025°N 23.6382°E
- Length: 32 km (20 mi)
- Basin size: 112 km^{2} (43 sq mi)

Basin features
- Progression: Gilort→ Jiu→ Danube→ Black Sea

The Pârâul Galben (also: Galbenu) is a left tributary of the river Gilort in Romania. It discharges into the Gilort in Bălcești. Its length is 32 km (20 mi) and its basin size is 112 km^{2} (43 sq mi).

== Tributaries ==
The following rivers are tributaries to the Pârâul Galben (from source to mouth):

- Left: Zănoaga, Băița
- Right: Mușet, Florile Albe, Bâzgele, Zmeura, Rudi
