= Kostenki =

Kostenki or Kostyonki (Russian: Костёнки) may refer to:

- Kostenki, Kirov Oblast, a village in Murashinsky District of Kirov Oblast
- Kostenki, Smolensk Oblast, a village in Safonovsky District of Smolensk Oblast
- Kostyonki, Voronezh Oblast, a selo in Khokholsky District of Voronezh Oblast
  - Kostyonki (palaeolithic site)
