= Rudyk =

Rudyk (Ukrainian: Ру́дик) is a gender-neutral Ukrainian and Polish surname that may refer to the following notable people:

- Bartosz Rudyk (born 1998), Polish racing cyclist
- Dmytro Rudyk (born 1992), Ukrainian football goalkeeper
- Kira Rudyk (born 1985), Ukrainian politician
- Mateusz Rudyk (born 1995), Polish track cyclist, brother of Bartosz
- Serhii Rudyk (born 1970), Ukrainian politician
- Yuri Rudyk (born 1991), Ukrainian figure skater

== See also ==
- Rudik (disambiguation)
