= Prehistory of Southeast Europe =

Prehistorical period of Southeastern Europe

Physical map of Southeast Europe

The prehistory of Southeast Europe, defined roughly as the territory of the wider Southeast Europe (including the territories of the modern countries of Albania, Bosnia and Herzegovina, Bulgaria, Croatia, Cyprus, Greece, Kosovo, Moldova, Montenegro, North Macedonia, Romania, Serbia, Slovenia, and European Turkey) covers the period from the Upper Paleolithic, beginning with the presence of Homo sapiens in the area some 44,000 years ago, until the appearance of the first written records in Classical Antiquity, in Greece.

The first written script of Greece was Linear A, an undeciphered script used for writing the Minoan language of Crete, as is the later Cypriot syllabary, which also recorded Greek. After Linear A came Linear B, a syllabic script used for writing Mycenaean Greek, the earliest attested form of the Greek language. The script predates the Greek alphabet by several centuries. The oldest Mycenaean writing dates to about 1400 BC. Linear B, found mainly in the palace archives at Knossos, Kydonia, Pylos, Thebes and Mycenae, but disappeared with the fall of the Mycenaean civilisation in the Late Bronze Age collapse.

Human prehistory in Southeast Europe is conventionally divided into periods including the Upper Paleolithic, Holocene Mesolithic/Epipaleolithic, Neolithic Revolution, expansion of Proto-Indo-Europeans, and a period of Protohistory. The changes between these are gradual. For example, depending on interpretation, protohistory may or may not include Bronze Age Greece (c. 3000–1200 BC), Minoan, Mycenaean, Thracian and Venetic cultures. By one interpretation of the historiography criterion, Southeast Europe enters protohistory only with Homer (See also Historicity of the Iliad, and Geography of the Odyssey). Nevertheless, prehistory ends before Herodotus in the 5th century BC.

== Palaeolithic ==
(2,600,000 – 13,000 BP)

=== Regional Transition to the Upper Paleolithic ===
(2,600,000 – 50,000 BP)

The earliest evidence of human occupation discovered in the region, in Kozarnika cave (Bulgaria), date from at least 1.5 million years ago.

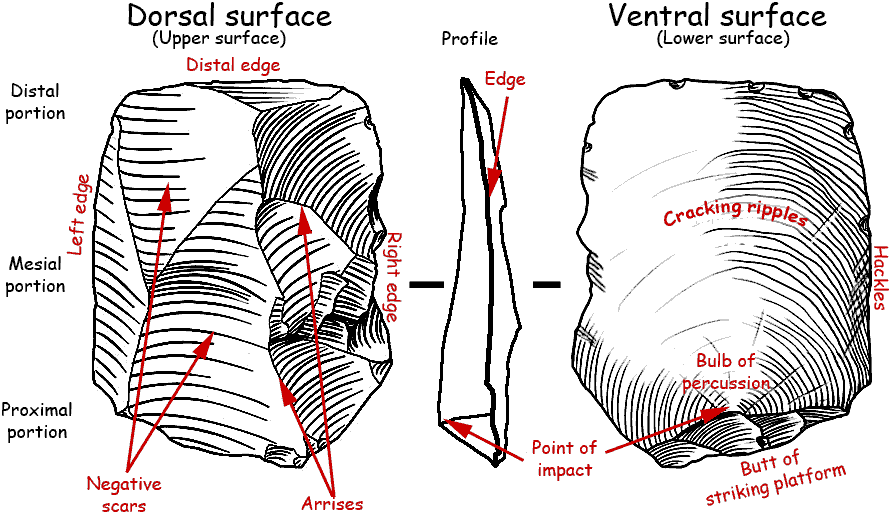
Fundamental elements for the technic description of a lithic flake

There is evidence of human presence in the Southeastern Europe from the Lower Paleolithic onwards, but the number of sites is limited. According to Douglass W. Bailey:

it is important to recognize that the Southeastern Europe Upper Palaeolithic was a long period containing little significant internal change. Thus, regional transition was not as dramatic as in other European regions. Crucial changes that define the earliest emergence of Homo sapiens sapiens are presented at Bacho Kiro at 44,000 BC. The Bulgarian key Palaeolithic caves named Bacho Kiro and Temnata Dupka with early Upper Palaeolithic material correlate that the transition was gradual.

The Palaeolithic period, literally the “Old Stone Age”, was a human cultural development characterized by the use of unpolished chipped stone tools. The transition from Middle to Upper Palaeolithic is directly related to the development of behavioural modernity by hominids around 40,000 years BP. To denote the great significance and degree of change, this dramatic shift from Middle to Upper Palaeolithic is sometimes called the Upper Palaeolithic Revolution.

In the late Pleistocene, various components of the transition–material culture and environmental features (climate, flora, and fauna) indicate continual change, differing from contemporary points in other parts of Europe. The aforementioned aspects leave some doubt that the term Upper Palaeolithic Revolution is appropriate to the Balkans.

In general, continual evolutionary changes are the first crucial characteristic of the transition to the Upper Palaeolithic in the region. The notion of the Upper Palaeolithic Revolution that has been developed for core European regions is not applicable to the region. What is the reason? This particularly significant moment and its origins are defined and enlightened by other characteristics of the transition to upper Old Stone Age. The environment, climate, flora and fauna corroborate the implications.

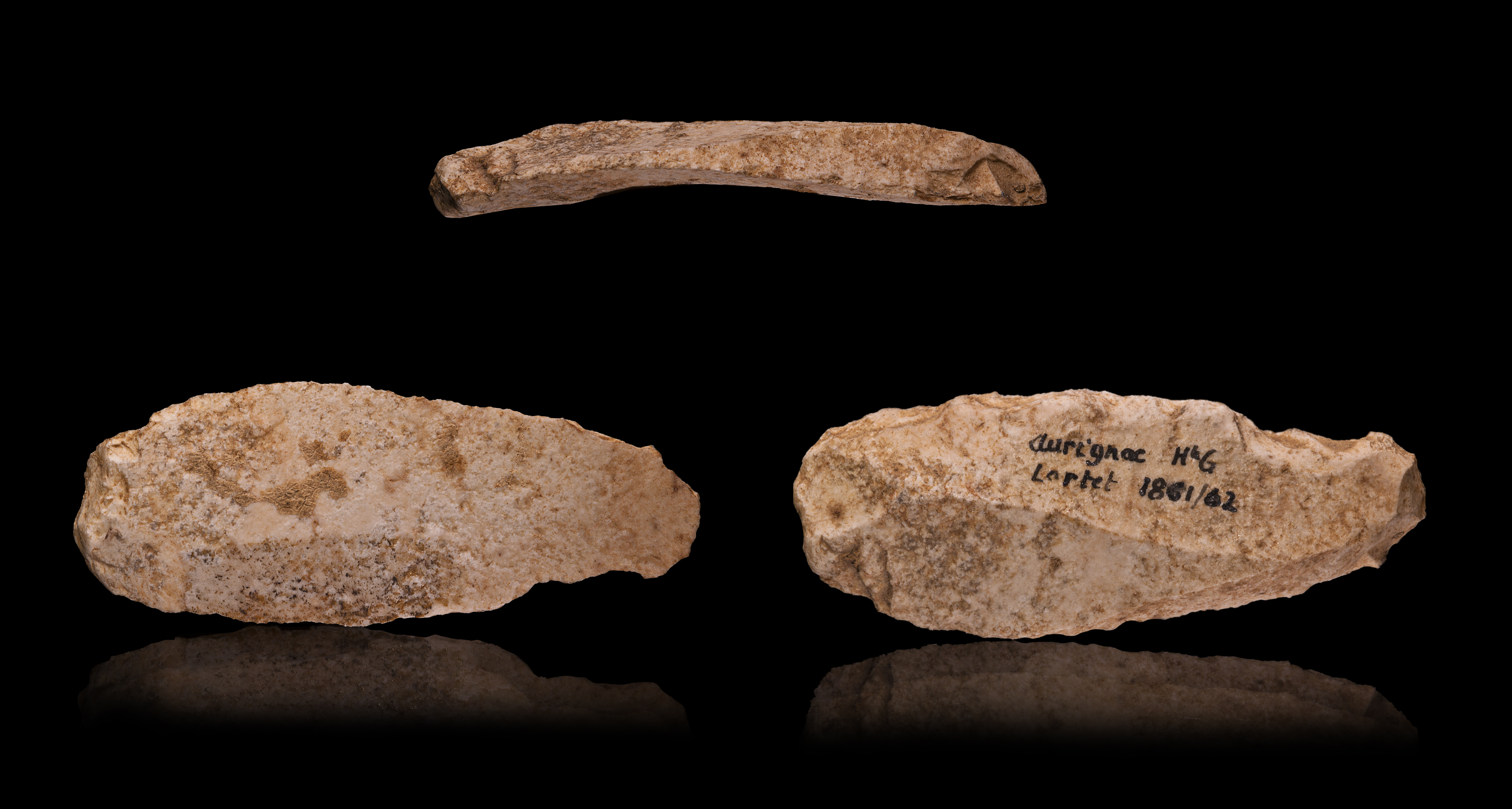
Aurignacian double edged scraper on blade - 3 views of the same object.

During the last interglacial period and the most recent glaciation of the Pleistocene (from 131,000 till 12,000 BP), Europe was very different from the regional glaciation. The glaciations did not affect southeastern Europe to the extent that they did in the northern and central regions. The evidence of forest and steppe indicate the influence was not so drastic; some species of flora and fauna survived only in this part of Europe. The region today still abounds in species endemic only to this part of Europe.

The notion of gradual transition (or evolution) best defines southeastern Europe from about 50,000 BP. In this sense, the material culture and natural environment of the region of the late Pleistocene and the early Holocene were distinct from other parts of Europe. Douglass W. Bailey writes in Balkan Prehistory: Exclusion, Incorporation and Identity: “Less dramatic changes to climate, flora and fauna resulted in less dramatic adaptive, or reactive, developments in material culture.”

Thus, in speaking about southeastern Europe, many classic conceptions and systematizations of human development during the Palaeolithic (and then by implication the Mesolithic) should not be considered correct in all cases. In this regard, the absence of Upper Palaeolithic cave art in the region does not seem to be surprising. Civilisations develop new and distinctive characteristics as they respond to new challenges in their environment.

=== Upper Palaeolithic ===
(50,000 – 20,000 BP)

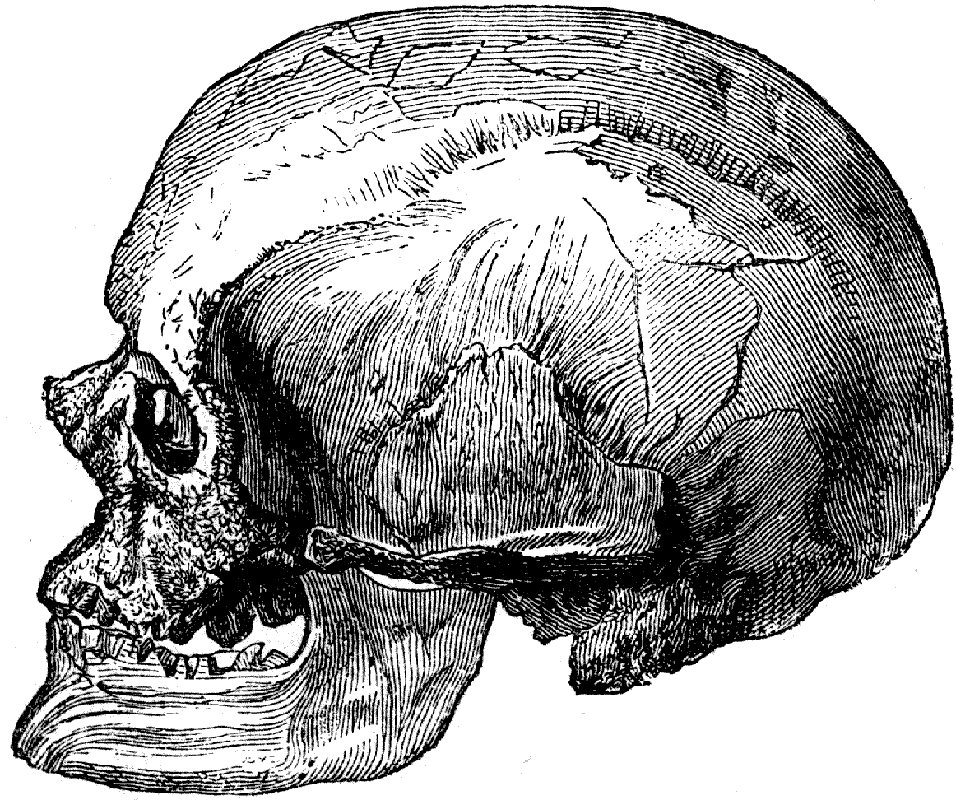
Male Cro-Magnon skull

In 2002, some of the oldest modern human (Homo sapiens sapiens) remains in Europe were discovered in the "Cave With Bones" (Peștera cu Oase), near Anina, Romania. Nicknamed "John of Anina" (Ion din Anina), the mandible is approximately 37,800 years old.

These are some of Europe's oldest remains of Homo sapiens, so they are likely to represent the first such people to have entered the continent. According to some researchers, the particular interest of the discovery resides in the fact that it presents a mixture of archaic, early modern human and Neanderthal morphological features, indicating considerable Neanderthal/modern human admixture, which in turn suggests that, upon their arrival in Europe, modern humans met and interbred with Neanderthals. Recent reanalysis of some of these fossils has challenged the view that these remains represent evidence of interbreeding. A second expedition by Erik Trinkaus and Ricardo Rodrigo, discovered further fragments (for example, a skull dated ~36,000, nicknamed "Vasile").

Two human fossil remains found in the Muierii (Peştera Muierilor) and the Cioclovina caves in Romania have been radiocarbon dated using the technique of the accelerator mass spectrometry to the age of ~ 30,000 years BP (see Human fossil bones from the Muierii Cave and the Cioclovina Cave, Romania).

The first skull, scapula, and tibia remains were found in 1952 in Baia de Fier, in the Muierii Cave, Gorj County in the Oltenia province, by Constantin Nicolaescu-Plopşor.

In 1941 another skull was found at the Cioclovina Cave near Commune Bosorod, Hunedoara County, in Transylvania. Anthropologist Francisc Rainer and geologist Ion Th. Simionescu published a study of this skull.

The physical analysis of these fossils was begun in the summer of the year 2000 by Emilian Alexandrescu, archaeologist at the Vasile Pârvan Institute of Archaeology in Bucharest, and Agata Olariu, physicist at the Institute of Physics and Nuclear Engineering-Horia Hulubei, Bucharest, where samples were taken. One sample of bone was taken from the skull from Cioclovina; samples were also taken from the scapula and tibia remains from Muierii Cave. The work continued at the University of Lund, AMS group, by Göran Skog, Kristina Stenström and Ragnar Hellborg. The samples of bones were dated by radiocarbon method applied at the AMS system of the Lund University.

The human fossil remains from Muierii Cave, Baia de Fier, have been dated to 30,150 ± 800 years BP, and the skull from the Cioclovina Cave has been dated to 29,000 ± 700 years BP.

== Mesolithic ==
(13,000 – 5,000 BP)

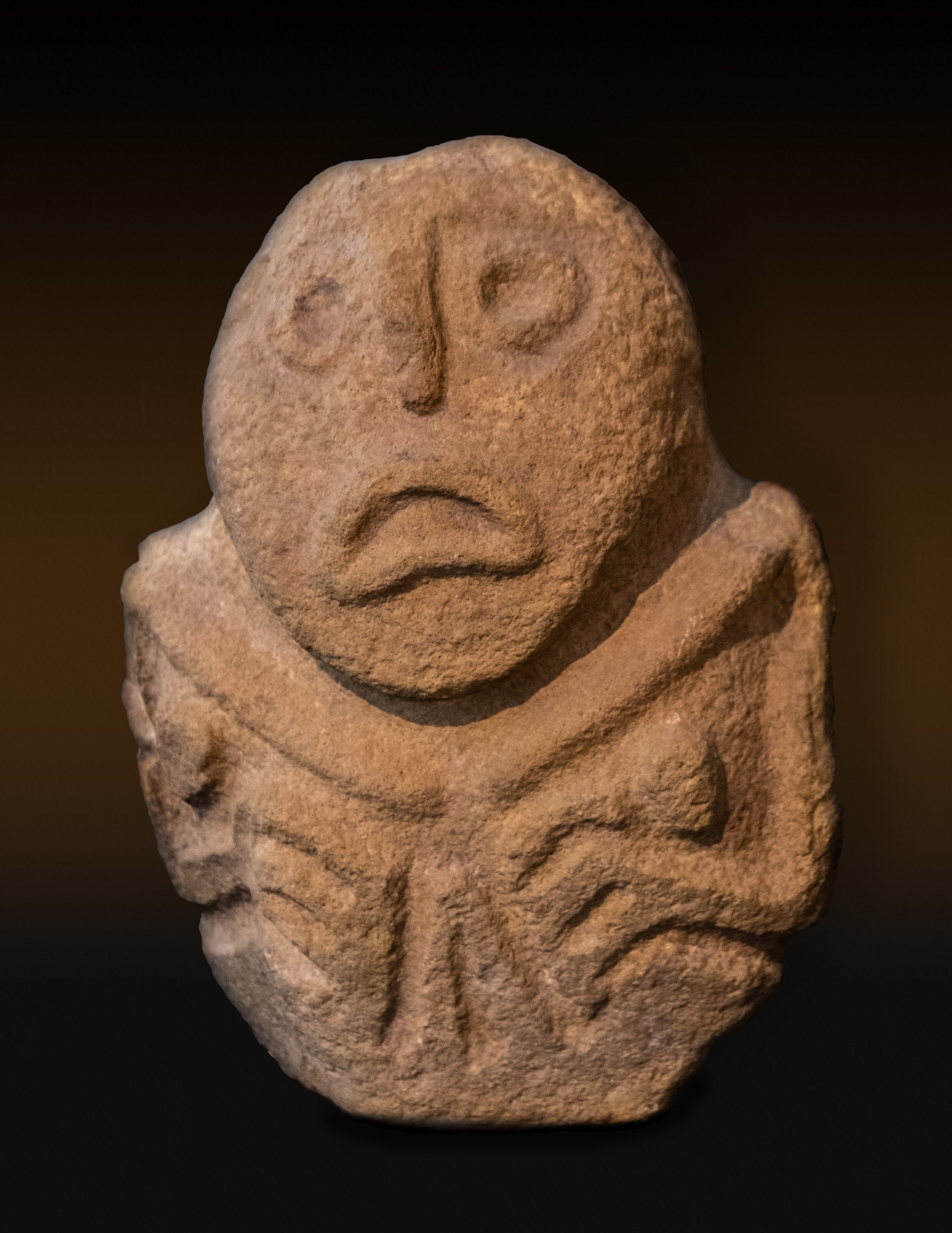
Sculpture found at the archaeological site of Lepenski Vir

The Mesolithic period began at the end of the Pleistocene epoch (10th millennium BC) and ended with the Neolithic introduction of farming, the date of which varied in each geographical region. According to Douglass W. Bailey:

It is equally important to recognize that the Balkan upper Palaeolithic was a long period containing little significant internal change. The Mesolithic may not have existed in the Balkans for the same reasons that cave art and mobiliary art never appeared: the changes in climate and flora and fauna were gradual and not drastic. (…) Furthermore, one of the reasons that we do not distinguish separate industries in the Balkans as Mesolithic is because the lithic industries of the early Holocene were very firmly of a gradually developing late Palaeolithic tradition

The Mesolithic is the transitional period between the Upper Palaeolithic hunter-gathering existence and the development of farming and pottery production during the Postglacial Neolithic. The duration of the classical Palaeolithic, which lasted until about 10,000 years ago, is applicable to Southeastern Europe. It ended with the Mesolithic (duration is two to four millennia) or, where an early Neolithisation was peculiar to, with the Epipalaeolithic.

In regions with limited glacial impact (e.g. Southeastern Europe), the term Epipalaeolithic is preferable. Regions that experienced less environmental impact during the last ice age have a much less apparent and straightforward change, and occasionally are marked by an absence of sites from the Mesolithic era.

There is lithic evidence of the Iron Gates mesolithic culture, which is notable for its early urbanization, at Lepenski Vir. Iron Gates mesolithic sites are found in modern Serbia, south-west Romania and Montenegro. At Ostrovul Banului, the Cuina Turcului rock shelter in the Danube gorges and in the nearby caves of Climente, there are finds that people of that time made relatively advanced bone and lithic tools (i.e. end-scrapers, blade lets, and flakes).

The single site with materials related to the Mesolithic era in Bulgaria is Pobíti Kámǎni. There has been no other lithic evidence of this period found in Bulgaria. There is a 4,000-year gap between the latest Upper Palaeolithic material (13,600 BP at Témnata Dupka) and the earliest Neolithic evidence presented at Gǎlǎbnik (the beginning of the 7th millennium BC).

At Odmut in Montenegro there is evidence of human activity in the Mesolithic period. The research on the period has been supplemented with Greek Mesolithic finds, well represented by sites such as Frachthi Cave. Other sites are Theopetra Cave and Sesklo in Thessaly that represent the Middle and Upper Palaeolithic as well as the early Neolithic period. Yet southern and coastal sites in Greece, which contained materials from the Mesolithic, are less known.

Activities began to be concentrated around individual sites where people displayed personal and group identities using various decorations: wearing ornaments and painting their bodies with ochre and hematite. As regards personal identity D. Bailey writes, “Flint-cutting tools as well as time and effort needed to produce such tools testify to the expressions of identity and more flexible combinations of materials, which began to be used in the late Upper Palaeolithic and Mesolithic.”

The aforementioned allows us to speculate whether or not there was a period which could be described as Mesolithic in Southeastern Europe, rather than an extended Upper Palaeolithic. On the other hand, lack of research in a number of regions, and the fact that many of the sites were close to seashores (It is evident that the current sea level is 100 m higher, and a number of sites were covered by water.) means that the Mesolithic Southeastern Europe could be referred to as the Epipalaeolithic Southeastern Europe, which might describe better its gradual changes and poorly defined development.

The relative climatic stability in Southeastern Europe, compared to northern and western Europe, enabled continuous settlement in Southeastern Europe. Southeastern Europe therefore may have effectively functioned as an ice-age refuge from which much of Europe, especially eastern Europe, was re-populated.

== Neolithic ==
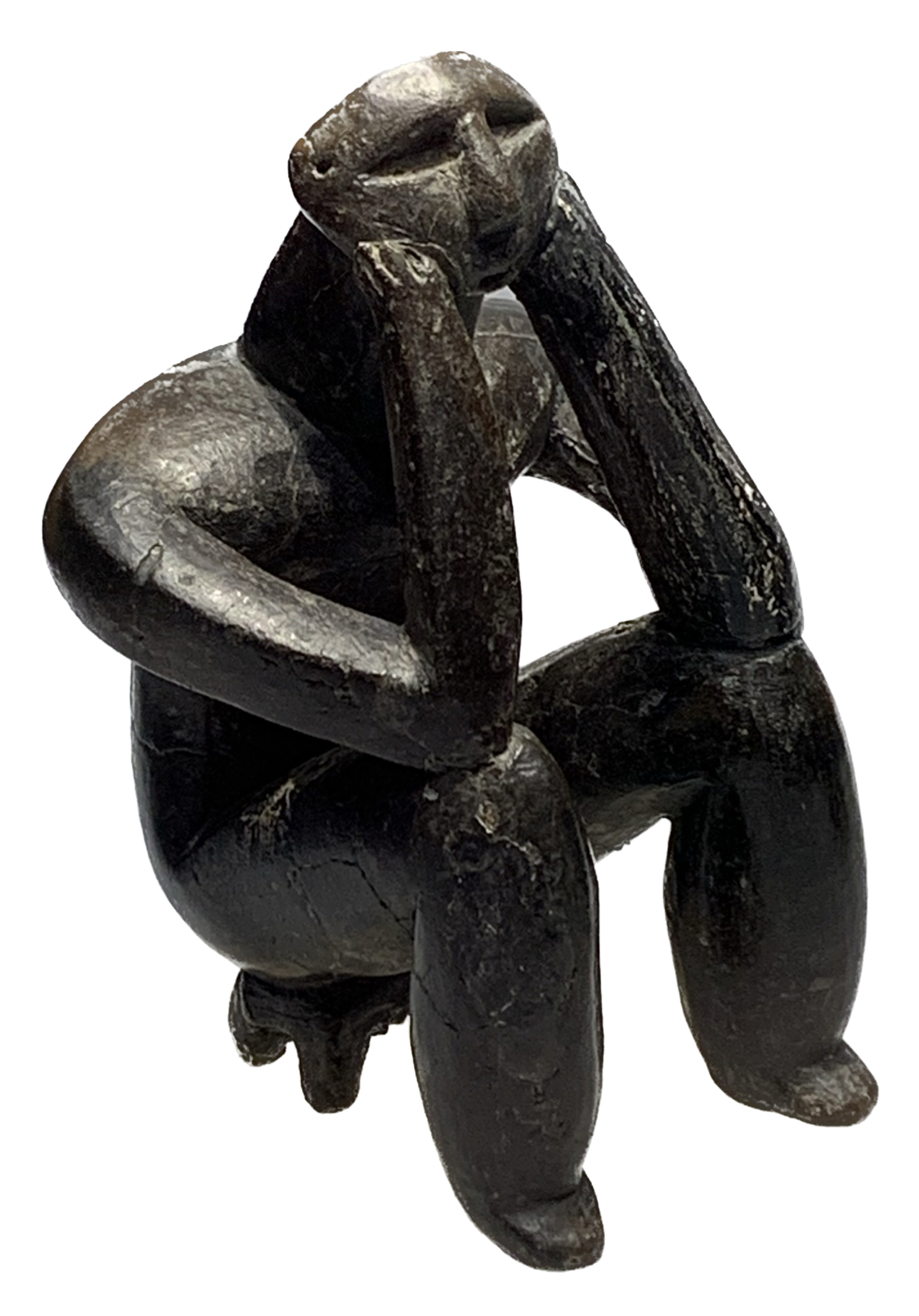
The Thinker of Hamangia, Neolithic Hamangia culture (c. 5250-4550 BC)

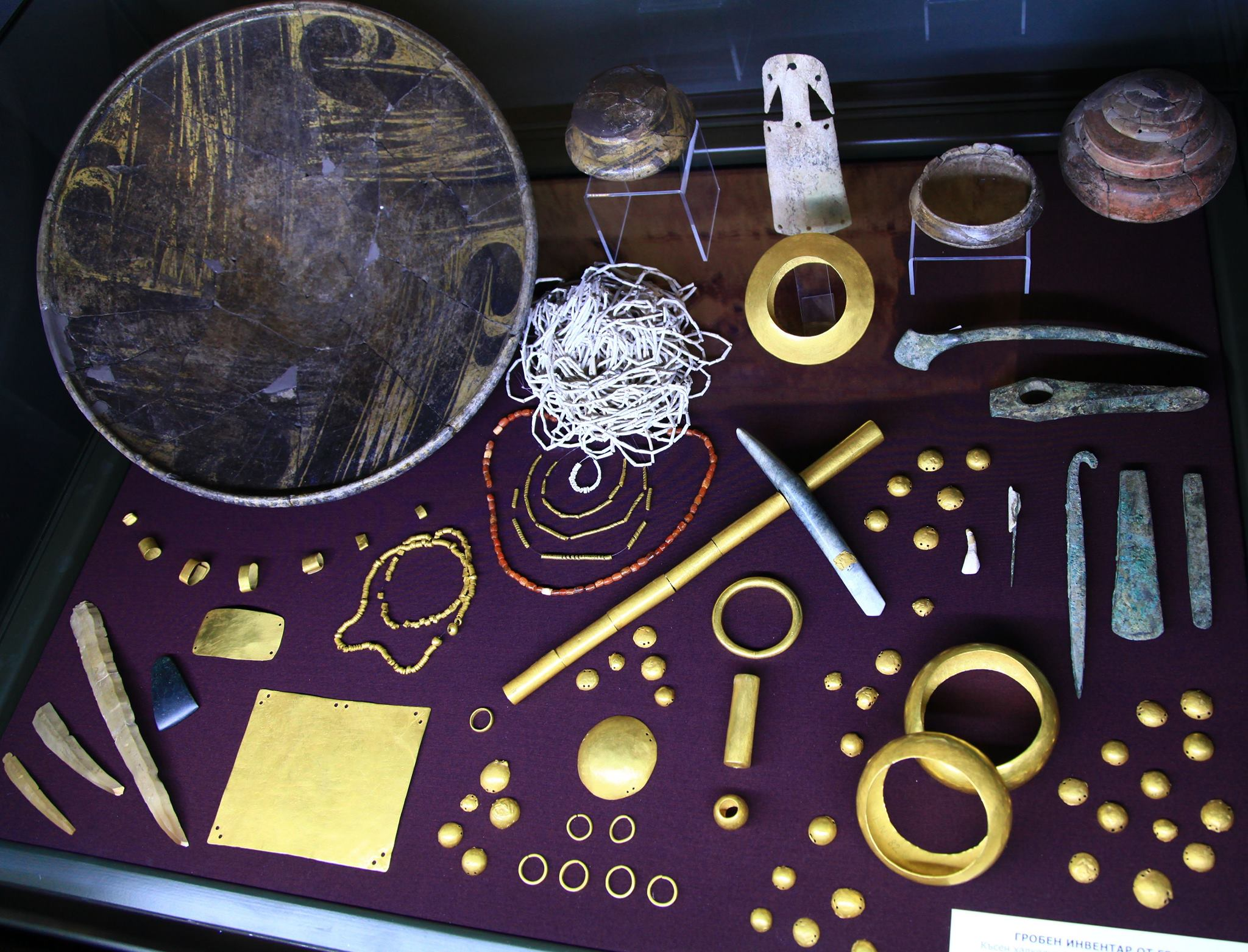
Artefacts from the Varna necropolis, Bulgaria

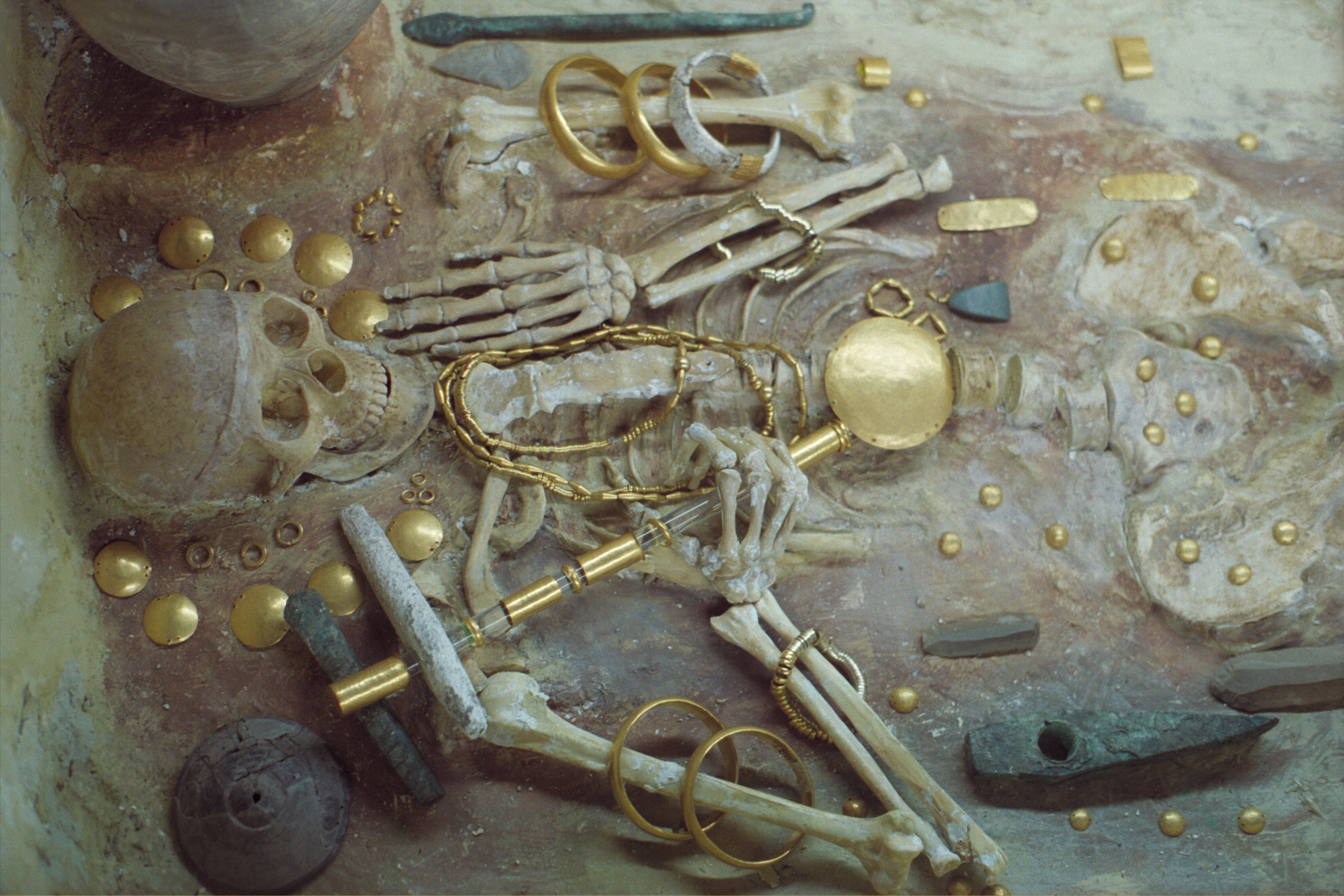
Elite burial at the Varna necropolis, original find photo (detail)

Southeastern Europe was the site of major Neolithic cultures, including Butmir, Vinča, Varna, Karanovo, Hamangia and Sesklo.

The Vinča culture was an early culture of Southeastern Europe (between the 6th and the 3rd millennium BC), stretching around the course of the Danube in Serbia, Croatia, northern parts of Bosnia and Herzegovina and Montenegro, Romania, Bulgaria, and the Republic of North Macedonia, although traces of it can be found all around the Southeastern Europe, parts of Central Europe and in Asia Minor.

The Varna Necropolis, Bulgaria, is a burial site in the western industrial zone of Varna (approximately 4 km from the city centre), internationally considered one of the key archaeological sites in world prehistory. The oldest gold treasure in the world, dating from 4,600 BC to 4,200 BC, was discovered at the site. The gold piece dating from 4,500 BC, recently founded in Durankulak, near Varna is another important example.

"Kurganization" of the eastern Southeastern Europe (and the Cucuteni-Trypillian culture adjacent to the north) during the Eneolithic is associated with an early expansion of Indo-Europeans.

Neolithic settlements are also spotted in modern day Greece, trading routes that are based in the late Mesolithic period exist all over the Aegean sea. Some major settlements of Neolithic Greece are Sesklo, Dimini, Early Knossos and Nea Nikomedeia close to Krya Vrysi.

- Butmir culture
- Starčevo-Criş culture
- Dudeşti culture
- Cucuteni-Trypillian culture
- Hamangia culture
- Vinča culture
- Varna culture
- Tărtăria tablets
- Kurgan hypothesis

== Bronze Age ==
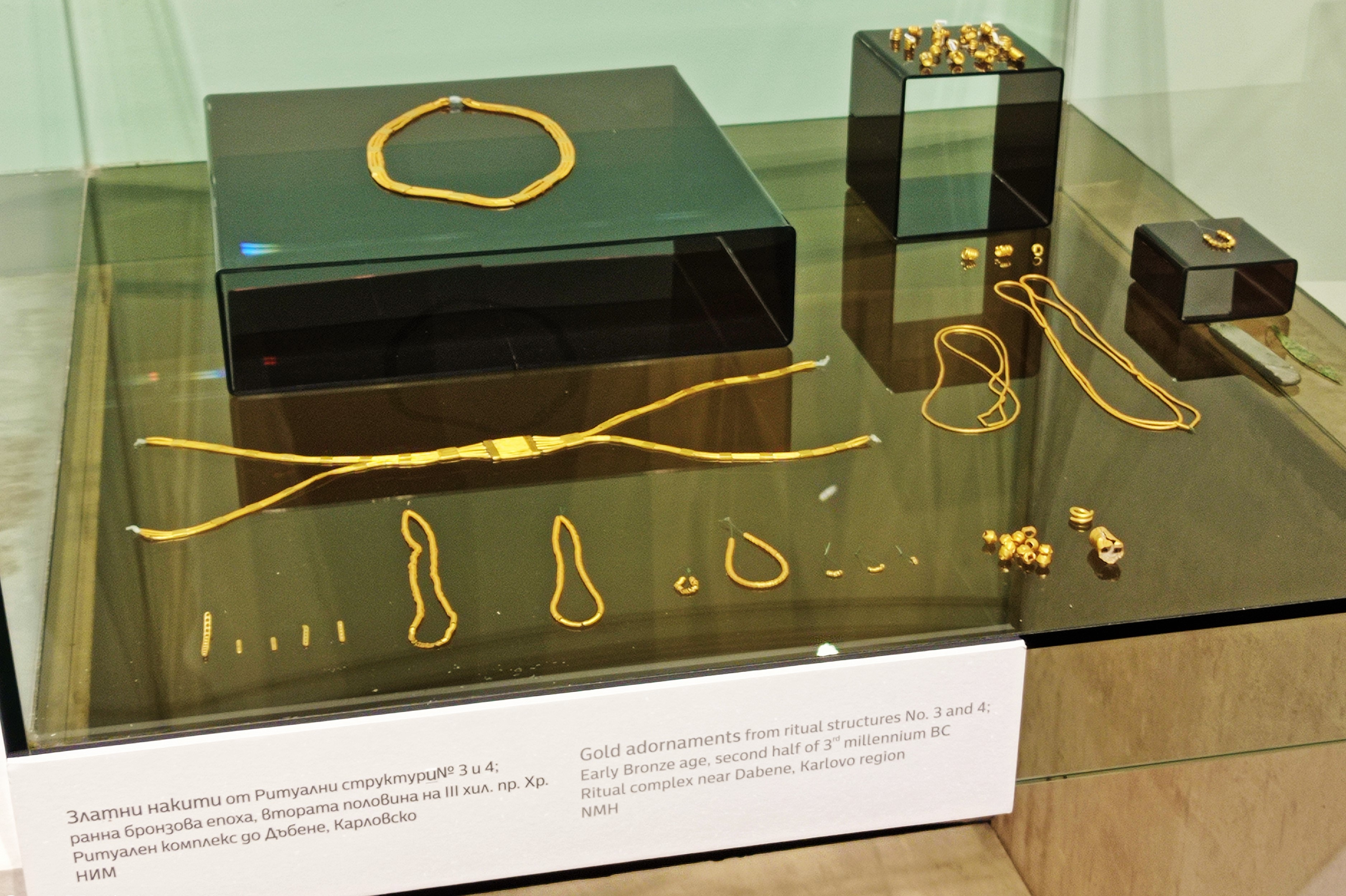
Part of the Dabene Treasure, c. 2450-2100 BC

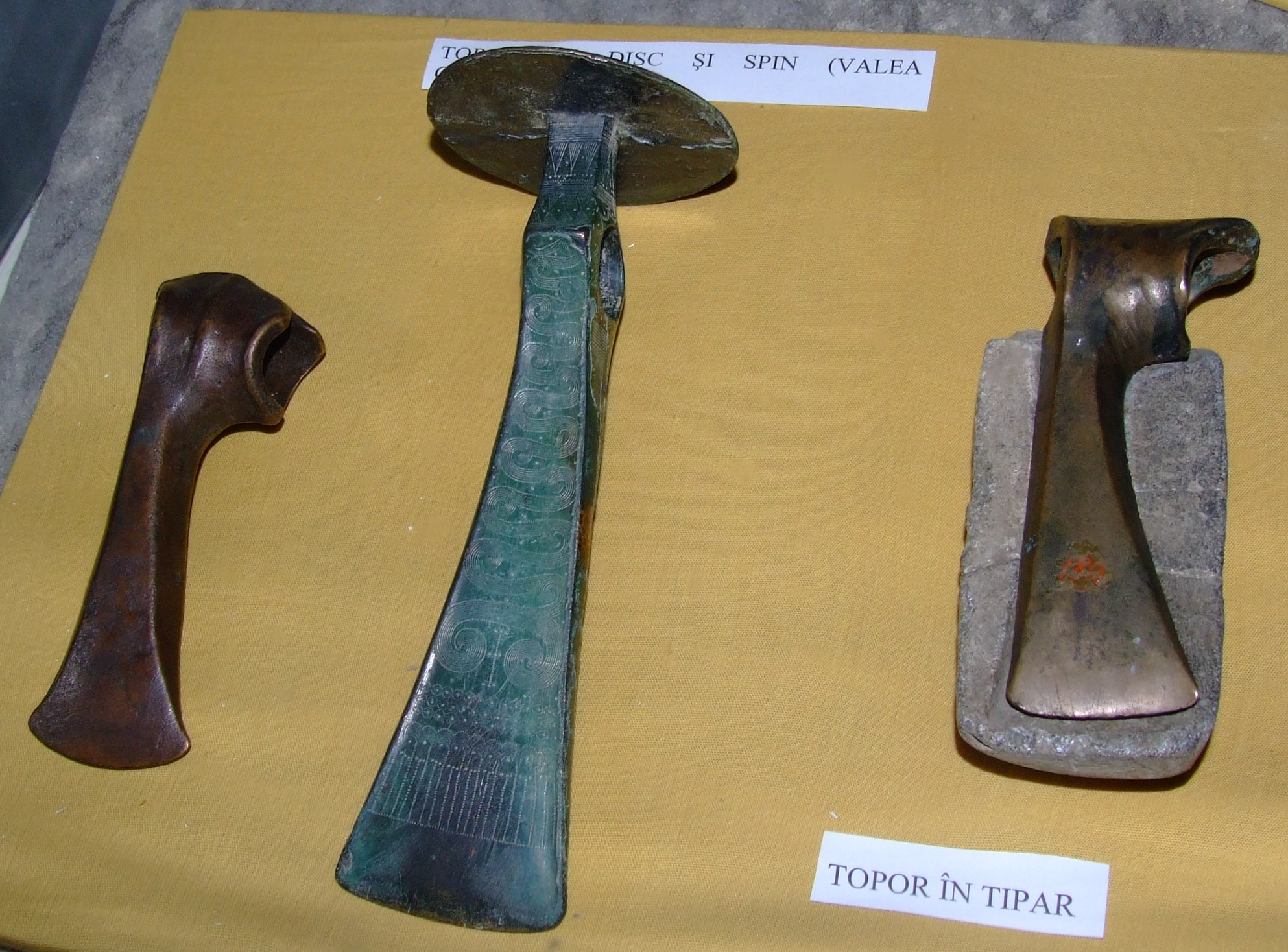
Wietenberg culture battle axes, Valea Chioarului, Maramureș County, Romania.

(3,500 – 1,100 BCE)

The Bronze Age in Southeastern Europe is divided as follows (Boardman p. 166):

- Early Bronze Age: 20th to 16th centuries BCE
- Middle Bronze Age: 16th to 14th centuries BCE
- Late Bronze Age: 14th to 13th centuries BCE

The Bronze Age in the central and eastern part of Southeastern Europe begins late, around 1800 BCE. The transition to the Iron Age gradually sets in over the 13th century BCE.

The "East Balkan Complex" (Karanovo VII, Ezero culture) covers all of Thrace (modern Bulgaria). The Bronze Age cultures of the central and western Southeastern Europe are less clearly delineated and stretch to Pannonia, the Carpathians and into Hungary.

The Minoan civilization based on the Greek island of Crete becomes Europe's first actual civilization.

The culture of Mycenaean Greece (1600-1100 BC) offers the first written evidence of the Greek language. Several Mycenaean attributes and achievements were borrowed or held in high regard in later periods. while their religion already included several deities that can also be found in the Olympic Pantheon. Mycenaean Greece was dominated by a warrior elite society and consisted of a network of palace states. It was followed by the Greek Dark Ages and the introduction of iron.

== Iron Age ==
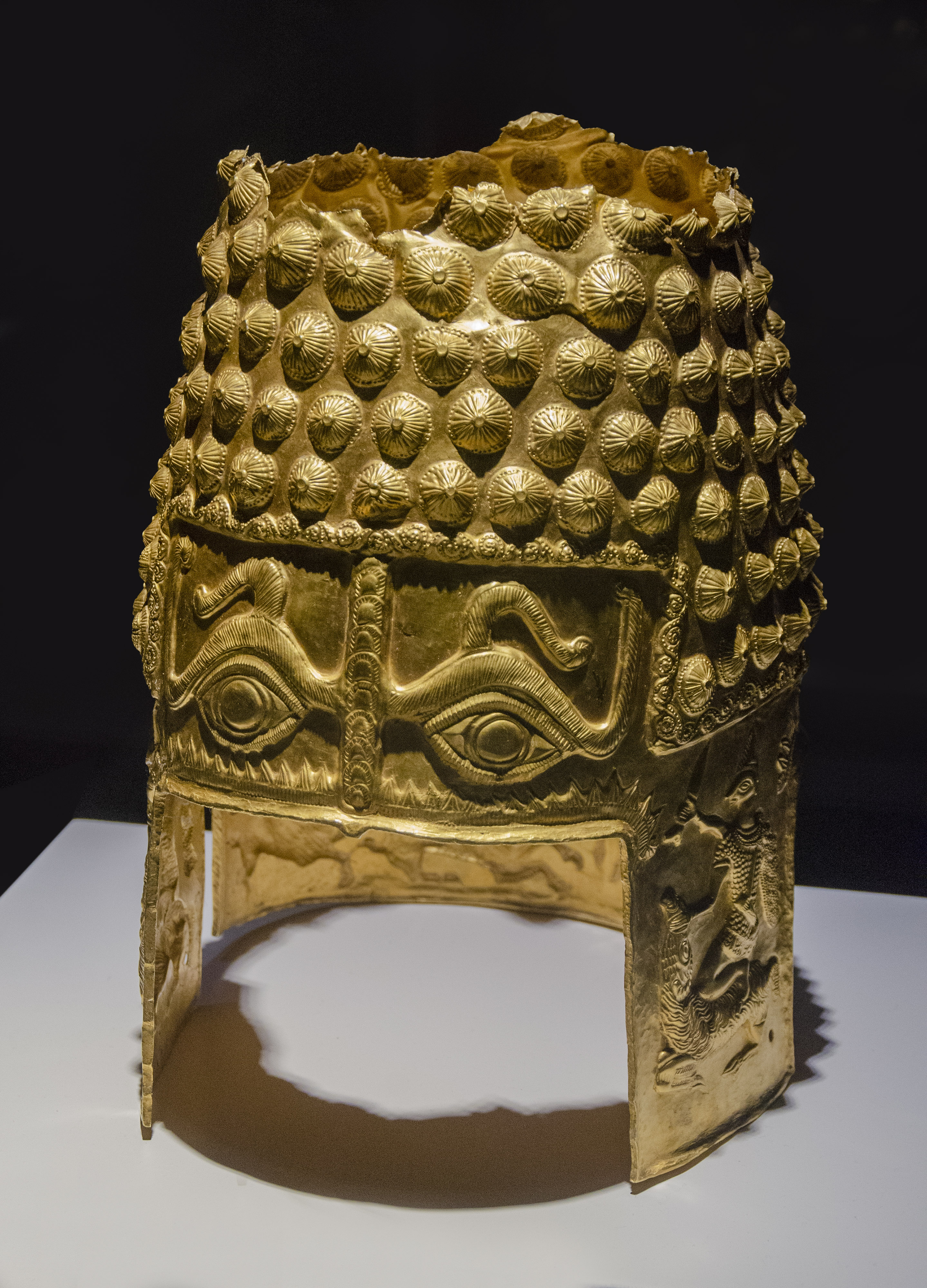
The Helmet of Coţofeneşti - a full gold Geto-Dacian helmet dating from the first half of the 4th century BC, exhibited at the National Museum of Romanian History before being stolen, now whereabouts unknown

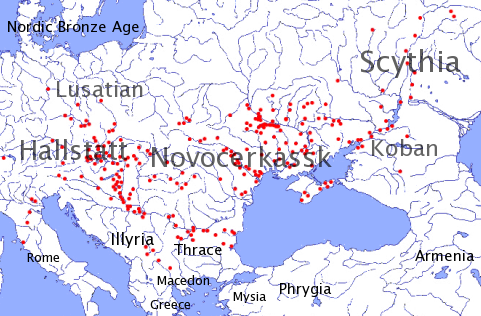
Distribution of "Thraco-Cimmerian" finds

(1,100 BCE – 150 CE)

After the period that followed the arrival of the Dorians, known as the Greek Dark Ages or Submycenaean Period, the classical Greek culture began to develop in Southeastern Europe, the Aegean islands and the western Asia Minor Greek colonies starting around the 9–8th century (the Geometric Period) and peaking with the 5th century BC Athens democracy. The Greeks were the first to establish a system of trade routes in Southeastern Europe and, in order to facilitate trade with the natives between 700 BC and 300 BC, they founded several colonies on the Black Sea (Pontus Euxinus) coast, Asia Minor, Dalmatia etc.

Other notable groups of peoples and tribes of Southeast Europe organised themselves in large tribal unions such as the Thracian Odrysian kingdom in the east of Southeastern Europe in the 5th century BC. By the 6th century BC the first written sources dealing with the territory north of the Danube appear in Greek sources. By this time the Getae (and later the Daci) had branched out from the Thracian-speaking populations.

The Illyrian kingdom in the west of Southeastern Europe from the early 4th century was organised by the Illyrian tribes situated in the area corresponding to today's Montenegro and Albania. The name Illyrii was originally used to refer to a people occupying an area centered on Lake Skadar, situated between Albania and Montenegro (see List of ancient tribes in Illyria). The term Illyria was subsequently used by the Greeks and Romans as a generic name to refer to different peoples within a well defined but much greater area.

Other tribal unions existed in Dacia at least as early as the beginning of the 2nd century BC under King Oroles. In the beginning of 1st century BC under Burebista's rule, Dacia expanded its territory from Central Europe to the Southern Europe.

Hellenistic culture spread throughout the Macedonian Empire created by Alexander the Great from the later 4th century BC. By the end of the 4th century BC Greek language and culture were dominant not only in Southeastern Europe but also around the whole Eastern Mediterranean.

== See also ==
- Aegean civilization
- History of Eurasia
- History of Europe
- Lists of ancient tribes in the Balkans
- Old European culture
- Paleo-Balkan languages
- Paleolithic Europe
- Bronze Age in Romania
- Prehistoric Croatia
- Prehistoric Europe
- History of Albania
- Prehistory
- Proto-Indo-Europeans
- Timeline of glaciation
- Slavic migrations to the Balkans
