= Patient relocation =

Patient relocation may refer to:

- Care transition, between health care practitioners
- Climatotherapy, relocation to another climate
