= Rudi River =

Rudi River may refer to:

- Rudi River (Nepal), a left tributary of the Madi River in Nepal
- Rudi (river), a right tributary of the Pârâul Galben in Romania
