= Carl Rüedi =

Swiss pulmonologist (1848–1901)

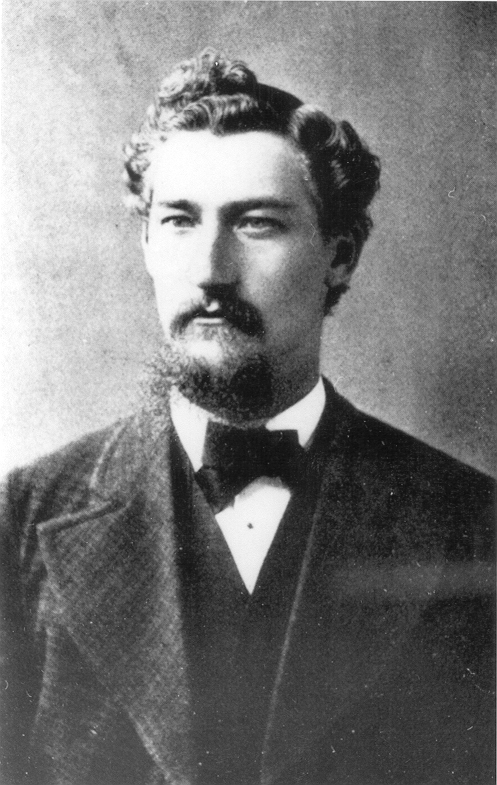
- Born: April 21, 1848 (or 23?); Davos, canton of Graubünden, Switzerland
- Died: June 17, 1901 (aged 53); Arosa, canton of Graubünden, Switzerland
- Occupation: pulmonologist
- Known for: treating Robert Louis Stevenson

Carl Rüedi (April 21 (or 23?), 1848 – June 17, 1901) was a Swiss pulmonologist and at his lifetime one of the best-known physicians in Graubünden.

Rüedi rose to fame around the world after having treated the Scottish author Robert Louis Stevenson in the winters of 1880-81 and 1881-82. Stevenson praised Rüedi in the dedication of his poetry collection Underwoods (1887) as "the good genius of the English in his frosty mountains".

== Life ==
=== Descent and childhood (1848-66) ===
Carl Rüedi was the youngest of eight children of the Graubünden district doctor and pioneer of climatotherapy Lucius Rüedi and his wife Rahel (née Conrad).

Yet in early childhood Carl Rüedi excelled himself by physical fitness, liveliness and intelligence. At the age of four Carl hiked with his father in midsummer from Alvaneu (the family's residence) to Davos (Carl's birthplace) 23 kilometers (14 mi) away. When Carl was nine of age, he and two of his brothers who attended the cantonal school at Chur, hiked 55 kilometers (34 mi) from Chur to Davos on one day.

=== Years of study and first sojourn in the USA (1866-74) ===
In 1866 Carl Rüedi enrolled at the University of Tübingen to study Protestant theology. In the summer of 1867, Rüedi continued his study at the University of Zurich.

Carl's elder brother Wilhelm had been living as a physician in the United States for 12 years. In 1867, Wilhelm came for a visit to his home village Zizers (Graubünden) and suggested his brothers Carl and Paul to follow him to America. Both agreed, and on 17 December 1867 they set out for Philadelphia (Pennsylvania). Paul, a trained physician, opened a doctor's office there and did not visit his homeland before 1882. (Paul (born 19 November 1844) had studied medicine at the University of Würzburg (winter of 1863-64), the University of Zurich (summer of 1864), the Ludwig-Maximilians-Universität München (summer of 1865 – winter of 1865-66) and the University of Tübingen (summer of 1866).) Impressed by his two brothers Carl also got interested in medicine.

After his father's death (1870) Carl returned to Zizers and took up a study of medicine at the University of Bern in April 1870. In the summer of 1871 he changed to the University of Würzburg.

In the winter of 1871-72 and the summer of 1872 Carl Rüedi continued his study of medicine at the Ludwig-Maximilians-Universität München. In the winter of 1872-73 he returned to the University of Bern and prepared himself for the final exams. In the spring of 1874, he received an M.D. (Doctor of Medicine) and opened a doctor's office in the village of Seewis im Prättigau (Graubünden).

=== Early working years: Davos (1874-91) ===
On 24 December 1874 Carl Rüedi received a call as a district doctor at Davos, Europe's leading winter health resort (beside St. Moritz) in those days. Thus, Rüedi held the same post as his father previously. Rüedi doctor's office was in the Rhätia hotel.

At Davos Rüedi erected a private residence called Villa Richmond. It was named after the county in the state of New York where he had spent some time between 1867-70.

On 26 February 1875 Carl Rüedi, together with two other representatives of the Rhätia hotel, was elected into the managing committee of the newly founded health resort club. On 30 or 31 July 1875, he was additionally elected its treasurer. In 1876, Rüedi was admitted to the Graubünden Society of Physicians (Bündner Ärzteverein) seated in Chur.

By the growing number of tuberculosis patients coming to Davos Carl Rüedi was well off. Within few years Rüedi gained an excellent reputation among his clientele. By the end of 1878 Rüedi resigned his post of a district doctor and concentrated on his activities as a private doctor.

Rüedi's therapeutic successes were attributed to his medical expertise and the high-Alpine climate of Davos, situated at an altitude of 1,560 m (5,118 ft), where the air is generally cool, clean, and dry. He was recognized for his precise diagnoses, a particularly sensitive ear during auscultation of the respiratory tract, and extensive knowledge of lung diseases and their various stages.

The major portion of Rüedi's clientele came from the Anglo-American countries. Thanks to his excellent command of English Rüedi gained a factual monopoly of this clientele within few years.

Carl Rüedi's popularity among the English-speaking patients was supported by his Scottish wife (née Mackenzie). On 25 June 1879 the couple had a son who was christened John (sic!).

=== Intermediate working years: Denver (1891-96) ===
Rüedi was so much in demand that he came to the limit of his capacity. To let his competence take effect under less exhaustive conditions he emigrated to the US by the end of April 1891 and opened a doctor's office at Denver (Colorado). Rüedi had chosen the town at the foot of the Rocky Mountains for her approximately same altitude (1,609 m / 5,279 ft) as Davos. There could be no talk, however, of similar climatic conditions, Rüedi confessed later.

In those years, American pulmonologists sent well-off clients for a high-altitude therapy to sanatoriums in the Swiss Alps (Davos, St. Moritz), the Giant Mountains (Görbersdorf) or the Adirondack Mountains (Saranac Lake, New York). In the Rocky Mountains, however, there was hardly any medical infrastructure for tuberculosis patients. Apart from a sanatorium in the hamlet of Hygiene (Boulder County, Colorado) (altitude 1,553 m / 5,095 ft) which Rüedi visited in October 1891 there only existed primitive camps of covered wagons and tents or isolated pensions and hotels.

Yet in the year of his arrival in America, Carl Rüedi was elected a fellow of the American Clinical and Climatological Association (ACCA). This professional organization had been founded by physicians and scientists in 1884 to improve the medical training, research and practice in the USA. In its early years the ACCA mainly aimed at treating tuberculosis patients by sojourns in a suitable climate. As a pioneer of the practical climatotherapy Rüedi was one of the main authorities for the concern of the ACCA. In 1895 Carl Rüedi held two lectures before the ACCA.

In his first lecture (A Comparison of the Winter Healthresorts in the Alps with some Places in the Rocky Mountains of Colorado), Rüedi argued that,

due to its climate, Colorado is "entitled to compete with any of the health-resorts of the world" and has the best climatic conditions to gradually become "The Sanatorium of the United States".

Rüedi presented the vision of a climatic health resort cluster in the Rocky Mountains. Each resort would be situated at a different altitude, thus allowing pulmonologists to choose where to send their clients, depending on the stage of illness and physical constitution: From Denver and surroundings to either Colorado Springs at 6,000 ft (1,829 m), Estes Park at 7,000 ft (2.134 m) or a location at 8,000 ft (2.439 m) still to be identified by Rüedi. "This would be a health-resort (sic!) not known before".

In his second lecture (A Peep into the Future, with Respect of pathological-anatomical Researches) Rüedi criticized the one-sided sympathy of his medical colleagues for the cytopathology. Rüedi pleaded for exploring not only the cells and tissues but also the liquid components of the human body outside the cells, in particular the blood serum, the lymph and the tissue fluid. Rüedi was convinced that analysing the blood serum would provide physicians a valuable means to forecast the „degenerations” in the cells of the respective person which are to be expected in the near future.

"We must get so far that in a few drops of blood we can ascertain the state of the blood-serum (...). If as much labor had been spent on the micro-chemistry of the blood as on the microscope we would be a great deal further on in our science."

Rüedi's expectations regarding the New World, however, did not materialize. (Perhaps the medical infrastructure developed too slowly in his eyes.) For that reason Rüedi returned to Switzerland after only five years (1896).

=== Last working years: Arosa (1896-1901) ===
In his absence, however, the working conditions for physicians at Davos had changed dramatically. By the introduction of a limited number of licenses to local physicians the exercise of the medical profession had become so regulated that even a capacity like Rüedi had no chance of opening a doctor's office there.

Instead of Davos Rüedi settled in the small health resort of Arosa (altitude 1,775 m / 5,823 ft), 13 kilometres (8.1 mi) west of Davos. In the winter of 1896-97, Rüedi started to practice as a private doctor at the Grand Hotel Arosa (nowadays Robinson Club).

Regarding its development, however, the village of Arosa lay decades behind Davos. The high-altitude therapy of tuberculosis had not been introduced there before 1880 when the first hotel (Seehof) was opened. And it was not before 1888 when the first sanatorium had opened. (At this time Arosa had not more than 88 residents.)

The number of Rüedi's clients remained disappointingly low. Rüedi seriously worried about his financial income and started to commit himself in raising the attractiveness of Arosa as a health resort. On 4 October 1896, Rüedi was unanimously elected a member of the local health resort club. He regularly participated in the meetings and made numerous proposals, e.g. the erection of an artificial toboggan run. On 22 June 1897, Rüedi suggested to introduce a street lighting. In November 1900, Rüedi and four of his medical colleagues suggested to establish a scientific club. Every two weeks three academics should discuss a subject of general interest (except religion and politics) in front of a public audience.

In his spare time Rüedi was active in organizing and timekeeping the wintertime sledge races which were first and foremost arranged for the entertainment of tourists.

Arosa's most serious impediment in development, however, was the lack of convenient transportation facilities to and from the village. In those years it took visitors several hours by stagecoach to travel the 18 kilometres (11 mi) from Chur. Carl Rüedi's greatest concern, therefore, was the improvement of the traffic connections from the Graubünden capital to Arosa.

On 14 September 1897, Rüedi and some other residents of Arosa established a commission with the objective of broadening the narrow road from Chur to Arosa. In 1900 (or shortly before) Carl Rüedi and the Graubünden Landammann (governor) Hans Brunold of Peist (1861 – 1941) submitted petitions to the Great Council (the parliament of Graubünden) and the Federal Assembly of Switzerland for the erection of an electric railway between Chur and Arosa.

Carl Rüedi, however, was not granted to witness the arrival of the first train at Arosa (December 1914). On 17 June 1901 Rüedi died unexpectedly at Arosa at the early age of 53.

== See also ==
- Tuberculosis management
- Tuberculosis treatment in Colorado Springs
