= Lucius Rüedi =

Swiss pulmonologist and climatotherapist

Lucius Rüedi (born at Igis (Graubünden, Switzerland) – 1870 at Alvaneu (Graubünden)) was a Swiss pulmonologist and pioneer of climatotherapy.

== Significance ==
Lucius Rüedi was the first physician to discover the healing effect of the high-Alpine climate on tuberculosis. In May 1844 he reported in a letter to the Zürich health spa physician Conrad Meyer-Ahrens that children suffering from tuberculosis at various levels of severity were sent home cured with nothing but scars in the lung after having treated by him.

Rüedi's discovery shattered the prejudice about the so-called "mountain disease" prevalent among alleged experts at that time. The thin, cold air at high altitudes, they argued, would excessively stimulate and ruin the lung, thus soon causing a general decay of the body. For the therapy of lung diseases physicians preferred to send well-off patients to warm regions on the Mediterranean Sea, like the Italian Riviera, the French Riviera or Egypt.

== Professional life ==
In the periods 1828-30 and 1835-48 Lucius Rüedi was a district doctor at Davos (Graubünden), from the summer of 1848 at Alvaneu (Graubünden).

== Private Life and Family ==
Lucius Rüedi was married to Rahel Conrad. The couple had eight children, among them six boys. Wilhelm was the eldest, Carl the youngest.

Like their father, several sons became physicians. Wilhelm, Paul (born 1844) and Carl (1848–1901) practiced some time in the United States. The best-known was Carl who treated the Scottish author Robert Louis Stevenson in the winters of 1880-81 and 1881-82.
