= Rudi (river) =

- Location within Romania

Location
- Country: Romania
- Counties: Gorj County
- Villages: Cernădia

Physical characteristics
- Mouth: Pârâul Galben
  - coordinates: 45.1433°N 23.7053°E
- Length: 10 km (6.2 mi)
- Basin size: 25 km^{2} (9.7 sq mi)

Basin features
- Progression: Pârâul Galben→ Gilort→ Jiu→ Danube→ Black Sea
- Tributaries
  - left: Cernăzioara
- River code: VII.1.34.5.2

The Rudi is a right tributary of the Pârâul Galben in Romania. It flows into the Pârâul Galben in Bumbești-Pițic. Its length is 10 km (6.2 mi) and its basin size is 25 km^{2} (9.7 sq mi).
