= Ruedi =

Ruedi may refer to:

- Ruedi (given name), German given name
- Ruedi Reservoir, on the Western Slope of the Continental Divide on the Fryingpan River, Colorado, United States of America
- Ruedi–Allgower classification, system of categorizing pilon fractures of the distal tibia

== See also ==
- Rüedi
- Rudi (disambiguation)
- Rudy (disambiguation)
