= Peștera Muierilor =

Cave and archaeological site in Romania

- Peștera Muierii
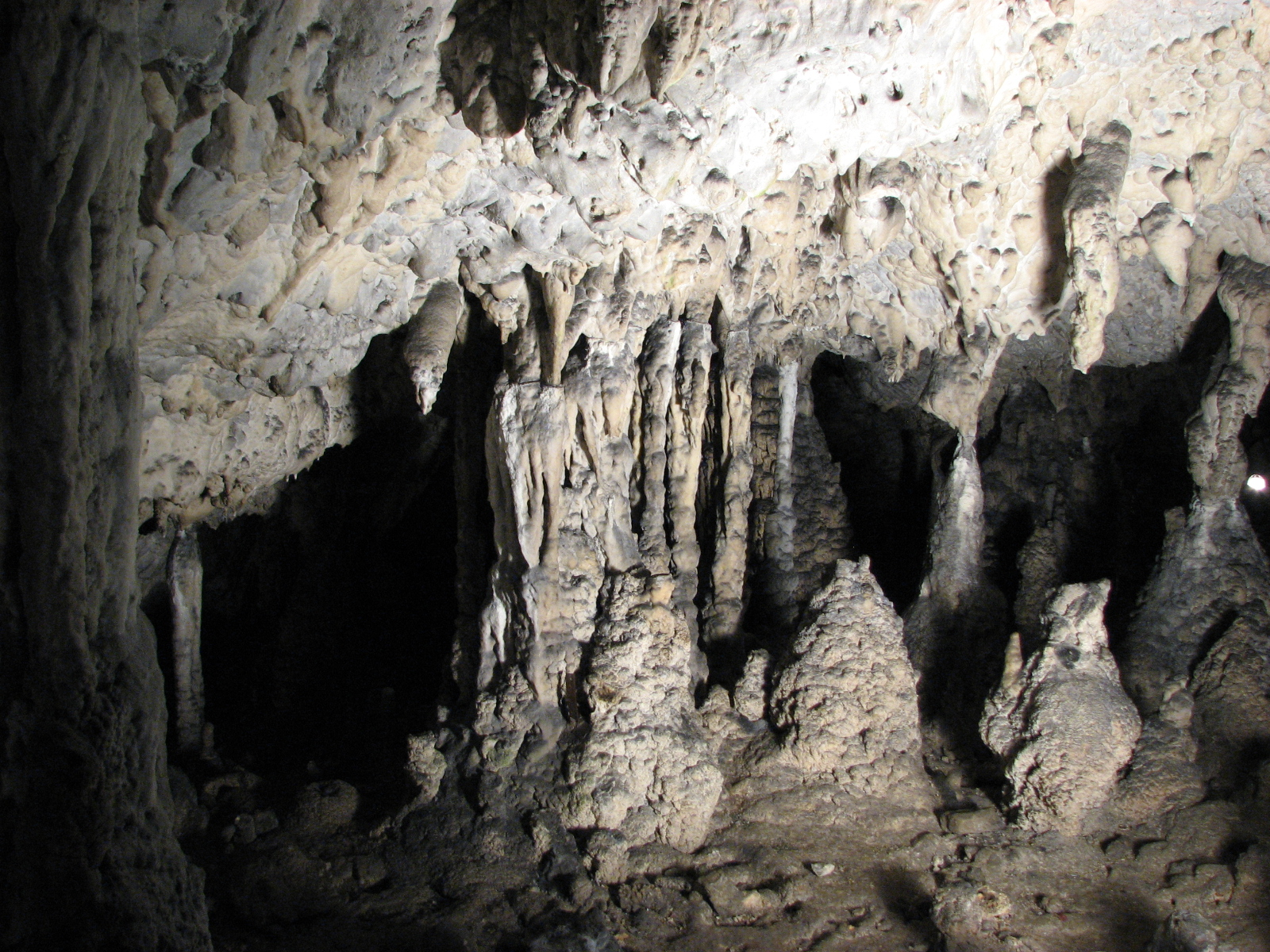
- Speleothems in the cave

- location in Romania
- 45°11′31″N 23°45′13″E
- Type: multi-chambered karstic cave
- Periods: Paleolithic
- Location: Baia de Fier, Gorj County, Romania

Site notes
- Excavation dates: 1951–1953, 1955
- Archaeologists: Constantin S. Nicolăescu-Plopșor

Peștera Muierilor, or Peștera Muierii (Romanian for "The Women's Cave", or "The Woman's Cave"), is an elaborate cave system located in the Baia de Fier commune, Gorj County, Romania. It contains abundant cave bear remains, as well as a human skull. The skull is radiocarbon dated to 30,150 ± 800, indication an absolute age between 40,000 and 30,000 BP. It was uncovered in 1952. Alongside similar remains found in Cioclovina Cave (from c. 29,000 BP), they are among the most ancient early modern humans in Romanian prehistory.

The human skull is that of a woman with obvious anatomically modern human traits, including a high forehead, small jaw, and small supraorbital ridges. Despite the tall cranial vault, the occipital bone forms a distinct dome, a trait normally associated with Neanderthals. The largely intact facial bones indicate a woman with "rugged traits". This mosaic of features mirrors those seen in the Lagar Velho 1 and Peștera cu Oase finds, indicating possible Neanderthal admixture or generally robust (archaic) traits (or both). The early date makes the find referable to the early Cro-Magnon group of finds.

On the basis of radiocarbon dating and also the analysis of the archaeological context, some researchers advanced the hypothesis of the association of these bones with Cro-Magnons and the Aurignacian archaeological culture. Others mention the possibility that these findings could belong to a certain regional culture from the Southern Carpathians, from the period of the Final Middle Paleolithic and Early Upper Paleolithic.

== DNA analysis ==
The remains of three individuals were found at the site. In a 2016 study, researchers extracted DNA from two upper molars from one of the three individuals, Peștera Muierii 1 (35,000 BP), and confirmed that the individual was a fully modern human; mtDNA analysis shows that Peștera Muierii 1 comes from a previously unknown basal mtDNA Haplogroup U6* lineage. As Haplogroup U6 is today common in North Africa, researchers believe that the U6 lineage in North Africa was the result of migration from Western Asian back into North Africa. Researchers also extracted DNA from the temporal bone of Peștera Muierii 2 (33,000 BP). This individual also comes from basal mtDNA Haplogroup U6 and was confirmed as being a female.

A full genome study conducted on the remains in 2021 revealed that the Peștera Muierii woman is related to modern Europeans, but not a direct ancestor. The woman also displays close genetic affinities to other Paleolithic Europeans, such as Kostenki-14. It was also found that the Paleolithic European hunter-gatherers displayed higher genetic diversity than expected, "demonstrating that the severe loss of diversity occurred during and after the Last Glacial Maximum (LGM) rather than just during the out-of-Africa migration". In contrast, Post-LGM hunter-gatherers in Europe displayed the lowest "ever observed" genetic diversity. The woman is estimated to be around 34,000 years old and unrelated to the earlier 40,000 year old Peștera cu Oase individuals.

== See also ==
- Peștera cu Oase
- Prehistoric Romania
- Prehistoric Transylvania
- Prehistoric Southeastern Europe
- Prehistoric Europe
