= Kostyonki–Borshchyovo =

Archaeological site in Russia

- Location of Kostyonki–Borshchyovo (red circle), and contemporary cultures c. 40,000-30,000 BP
- Interactive map of Kostyonki–Borshchyovo
- 51°23′09″N 39°03′06″E
- Periods: Paleolithic

History
- Built: c. 40,000 BP

The Kostyonki–Borshchyovo archaeological complex is an area where numerous Upper Paleolithic archaeological sites have been found, located around the villages of Kostyonki (also Kostenki) and Borshchyovo (also Borshchevo). The area is found on the western (right) bank of the Don River in Khokholsky District, Voronezh Oblast, Russia, some 25 km south of the city of Voronezh. The 26 Paleolithic sites of the area are numbered Kostenki 1–21 and Borshchevo 1–5.

It is known for its high concentration of cultural remains of anatomically modern humans from the beginning of the Upper Paleolithic era, before 40,000 years ago. Finds are on exhibit in situ, at the State Archaeological Museum–Reserve Kostyonki built atop the mammoth bone circle Kostenki 11. Kostyonki is considered as belonging to the Aurignacian culture.

== History ==
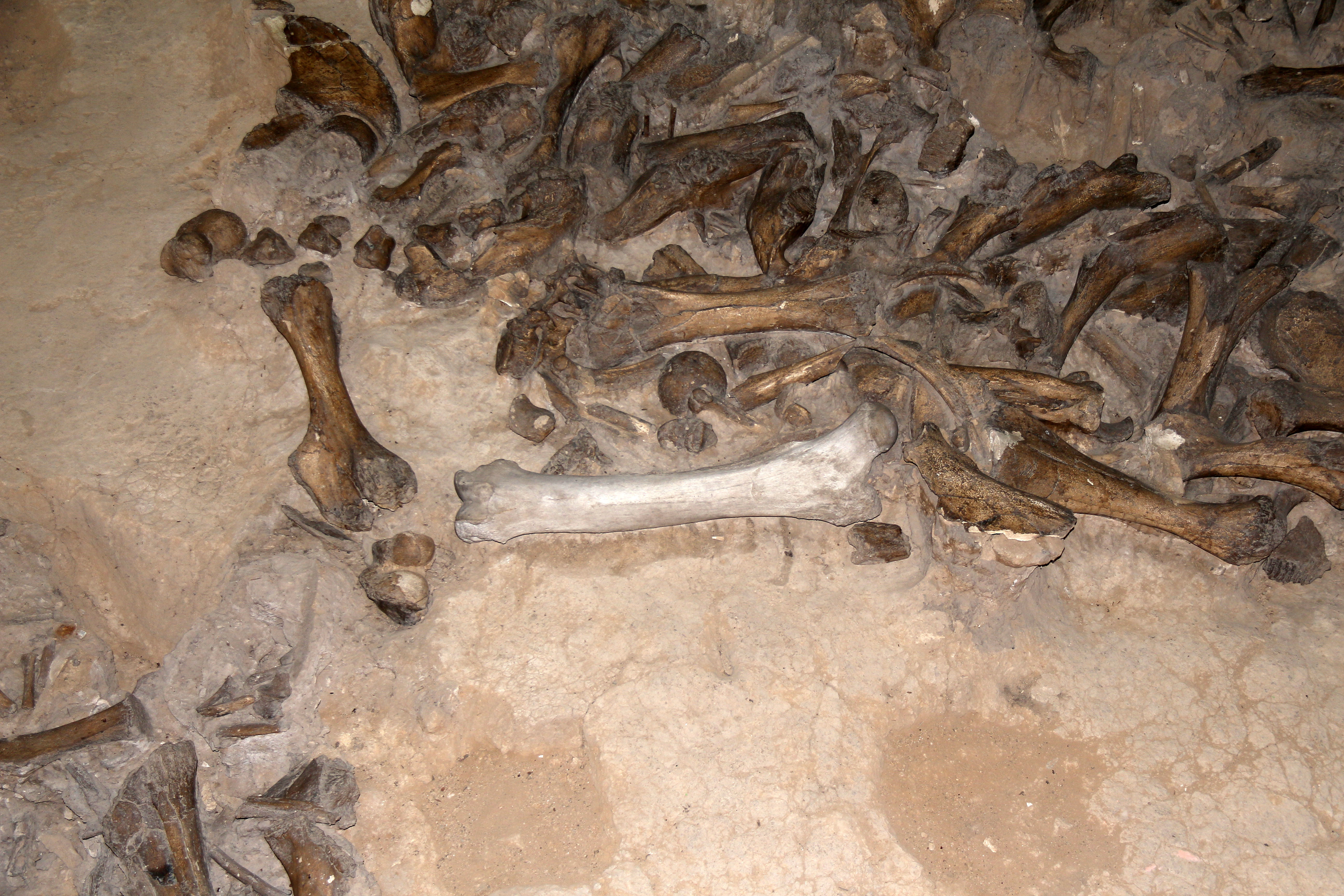
Mammoth bones on exhibit in Kostyonki museum

Mammoth teeth were found at the site from an early time. Cornelis de Bruijn wrote in 1703:

"In the locality in which we were, to our great surprise, we found many elephant teeth, of which I kept one myself, for the sake of curiosity, but I can not understand how these teeth could get here. True, the Emperor [Peter I] told us that Alexander the Great, passing this river, as some historians assure, reached the small town of Kostenka, about eight versts from here, and that it could very well be that at that time several elephants had fallen, the remains of which are still here today."

The site is also mentioned by Samuel Gottlieb Gmelin in 1768. The settlement name Kostyonki itself is a derivation from кость "bone".

Kostenki-1 was excavated by I. S. Polyakov (1845–1887) in 1879. Further excavations during 1881–1915 were mostly searches for stone tools. Systematic excavations were performed from the 1920s, most notably those led by P.P. Efimenko during 1923–1938.

In the second half of the 20th century it was recognized that there were other sites in the neighbourhood, now labelled Kostenki-1 to Kostenki-21 and Borshchevo-1 to Borshchevo-5. The most famous of these are Kostenki-12 (Volkovska) and Kostenki-14 (Markina Gora).

A 25,000-year-old bone circle structure of at least 60 mammoths, measuring over 12.5 metres (41 ft) in diameter, was discovered at Kostenki in 2020.

== Sites ==
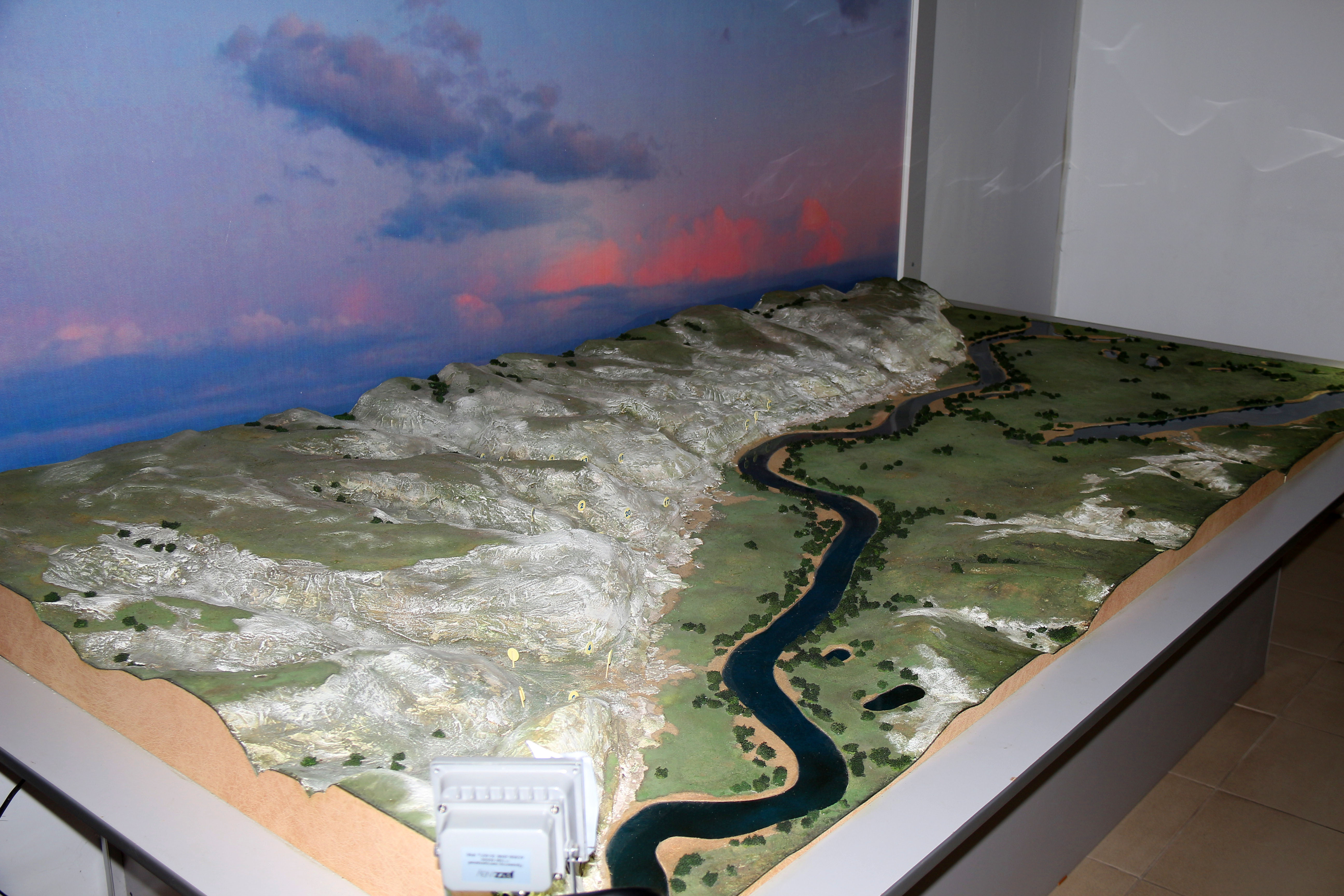
Kostyonki terrain model

Kostenki-1/2 (site Kostenki-1, layer 2), Kostenki-1/3, Kostenki-6 (Streletskaya), Kostenki-11 and Kostenki 12/3 below the volcanic CI tephra layer are associated to the nontransitional local "Strelets culture", analogous to early Upper Paleolithic cultures from central and western Europe such as the Szeletian culture. This initial cultural development might be attributable to local Neanderthals. Ornaments predating the volcanic eruption, found at Kostenki 17/2 ("Spitsyn culture", 38–32 ka), were apparently perforated by a hand-operated rotary drill or drills; these may suggest that the population was technologically capable of preparing for a volcanic winter. Just above the ash layer sewing needles were found .

Kostenki 1/1, Kostenki 4/2, Kostyonki 8/2 and Kostenki 21/3 belong to the eastern Gravettian (24 to 22 ka). Kostenki 2, Kostenki 3, Kostenki 11-1a and Kostenki-19 belong to the Zamyatino culture (22 to 17 ka). Kostenki 8/2 (Telmanskaya) is eponymous of "Telman culture".

Map of the Kostenki prehistoric sites

As of 2016, archaeological work is done at Kostenki-14 (Markina Gora), Kostenki-6 (Streletskaya), Kostenki-15 (Gorodtsovskaya), Kostenki-16 (Ugljanka), Kostenki-17 (Spitsynskaya) and Kostenki-21 (Gmelinskaya).

== Human remains ==
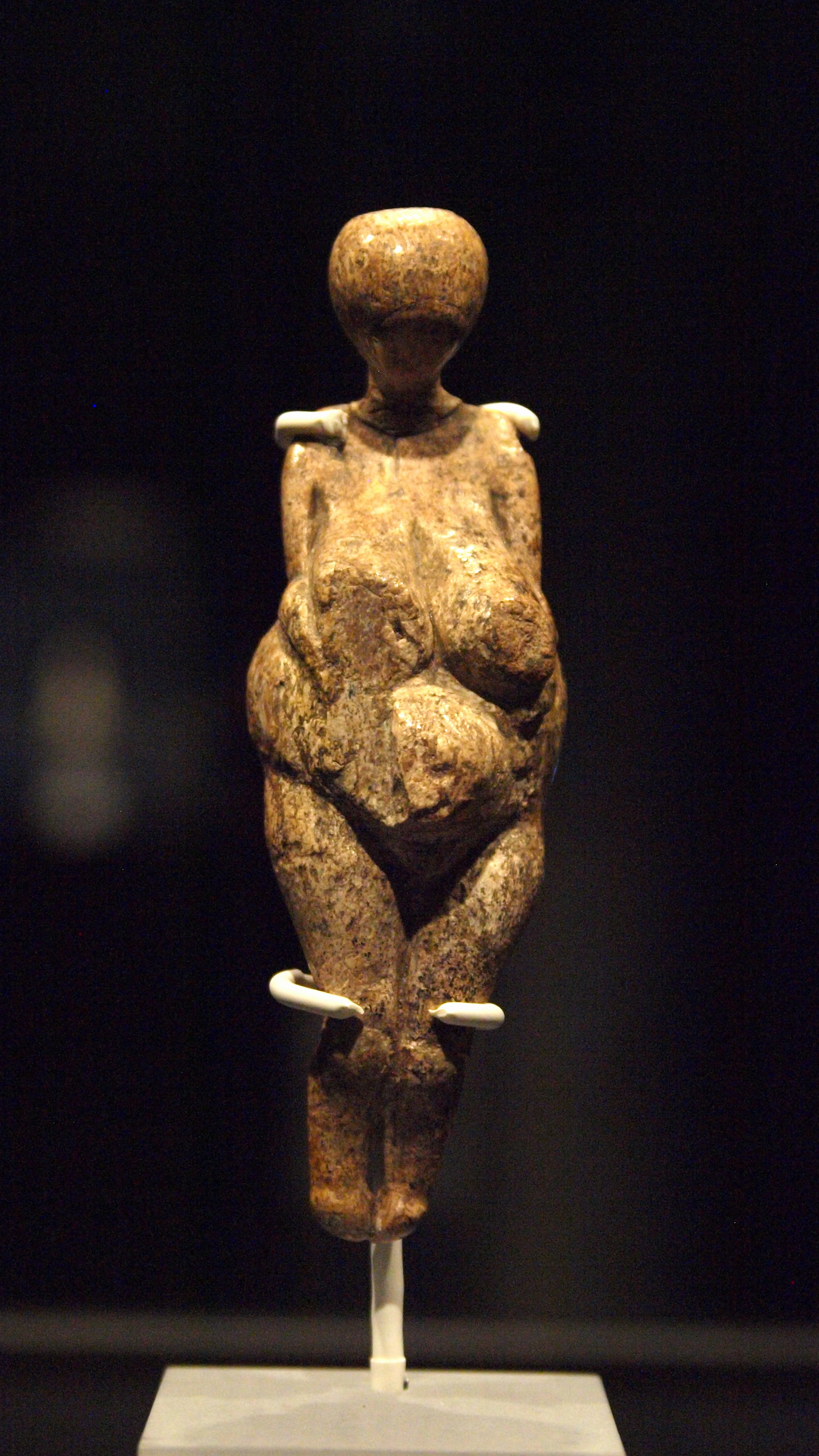
Venus figurine of Kostyonki, Gravettian, ca. 25.000 BP

Some of the earliest directly dated human remains from this site are dated to 32,600 ± 1,100 14C years and consist of a tibia and a fibula, with traits classifying the bones as European early modern humans.

In 2009, DNA was extracted from the remains of a male hunter-gatherer from Kostenki-12 who lived circa 30,000 BP and died aged 20–25. His maternal lineage was found to be mtDNA haplogroup U2. He was buried in an oval pit in a crouched position and covered with red ochre. Kostenki 12 was later found to belong to the patrilineal Y-DNA haplogroup C1* (C-F3393).

=== Kostenki-14 ===
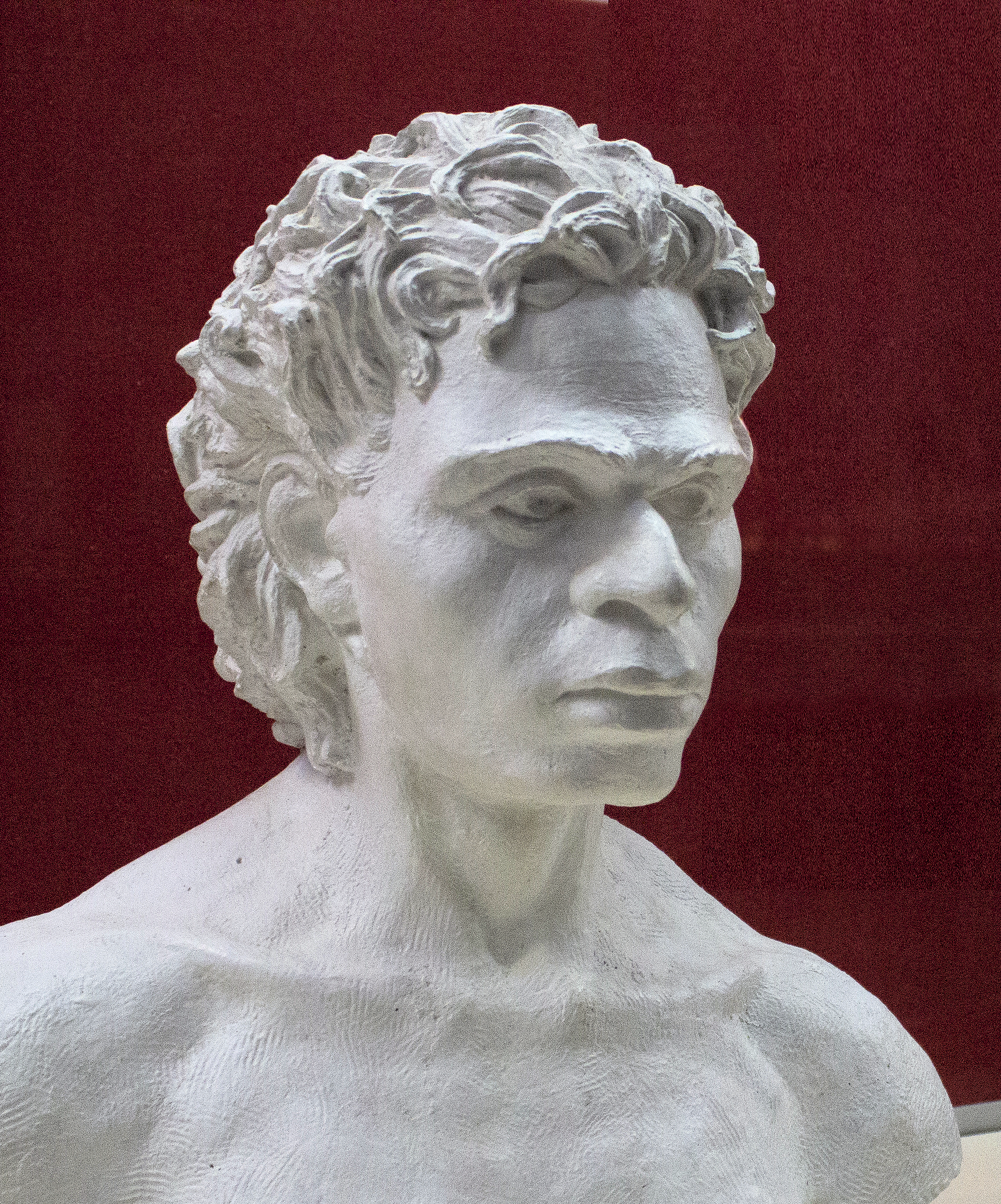
Reconstruction of Homo Sapien from the Kostenki 14 site, by M.M. Gerasimov. State Archaeological Museum-Reserve Kostenki

A male from Kostenki-14 (Markina Gora), who lived approximately 38,700–36,200 years ago, was also found to belong to mtDNA haplogroup U2. His Y-DNA haplogroup was C1b* (F1370).

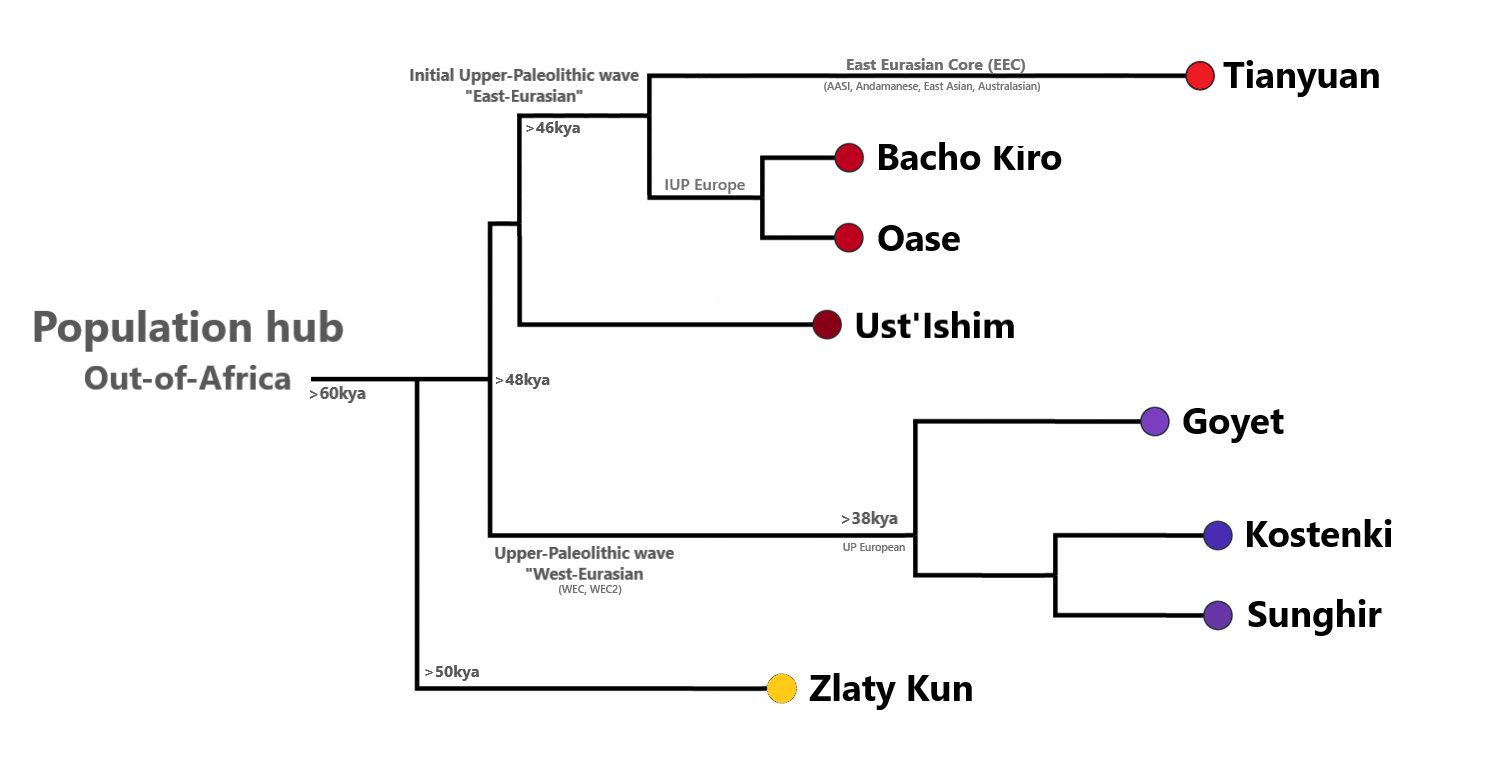
Phylogenetic position of ancient Upper Paleolithic Eurasian specimens.

The Kostenki-14 genome represents early evidence for the separation of Europeans and East Asian lineages. He was found to have a close relationship to both Paleolithic European and Siberian hunter-gatherers, such as the Sungir specimens from western Russia, the Peștera Muierii woman (34 kya) in Romania, or the "Mal'ta boy" (24 kya) of south-east Siberia (Ancient North Eurasian) and to the later Mesolithic hunter-gatherers of Europe (Western Hunter-Gatherer) and western Siberia, as well as with a basal population ancestral to Early European Farmers, but not to East Asians. Kostenki-14 showed that the main ancestral components of contemporary Europeans were likely already genetically differentiated and related at least 36,200 years ago, with the modern European genomic structure dating back to the Upper Paleolithic. Kostenki-14 had some level of ancient Neanderthal admixture, which has been dated as going back to circa 54,000 BP.

== Volcanic ash ==
A layer of Campanian volcanic ash, earlier dated to about 45,000 years ago, has been found above some of the finds, showing that humans inhabited the site before this.

Currently, the Campanian Ignimbrite eruption of the Phlegraean Fields volcano is dated to about 39 kya. The explosion of 500 cubic kilometers (120 cu mi) ignimbrite was the largest in the last 200,000 years of European history.
