= Weather pains =

Pain allegedly caused by weather changes

Weather pains, weather-related pain, or meteoropathy is a phenomenon that occurs when people with conditions such as arthritis or limb injuries claim to feel pain, particularly with changes in barometric pressure, humidity or other weather phenomena. Scientific evidence, however, does not support a connection between weather and pain, and concludes that it is largely or entirely due to perceptual errors such as confirmation bias, with the possible exception being headaches and migraines.

== Historic beliefs ==
A hypothetical relationship between changes in weather and pain has been documented since the classical Roman age, with Hippocrates in about 400 B.C. perhaps being the first to claim a connection. Anecdotal evidence provided by people such as Monica Seles and widely used expressions such as "aches and pain, coming rains", "feeling under the weather", and "ill health due to evil winds" reinforce the popular opinion that this effect is real, despite the lack of scientific evidence supporting this contention.

== Scientific evaluation ==
The first publication to document a change in pain perception associated with the weather was the American Journal of the Medical Sciences in 1887. This involved a single case report describing a person with phantom limb pain, and it concluded that "approaching storms, dropping barometric pressure and rain were associated with increased pain complaint."

Most investigations examining the relationship between weather and pain have studied people diagnosed with arthritis. After reviewing many case reports, Rentshler reported in the Journal of the American Medical Association in 1929 that there was strong evidence that "warm weather is beneficial and barometric pressure changes are detrimental to patients with arthritis."

Countering the 1929 barometric pressure claim, in a 2016 article entitled "Do Your Aches, Pains Predict Rain?" professor of atmospheric sciences Dennis Driscoll is reported as stating: "People need to realize that the pressure changes associated with storms are rather small." Driscoll observes that the changes associated with a storm are about equivalent to what a person experiences in going up an elevator in a tall building. So far, there have not been many reports of people with arthritis hobbled by elevator rides in the medical literature.

A study published in the British Medical Journal in 2017 examined reports of joint or back pain from millions of doctor visits between 2008 and 2012 as recorded by Medicare, the U.S. health system for the elderly. It compared these to rain data as recorded by the National Oceanic and Atmospheric Administration, but found no correlation at all. The study concluded:

Data on millions of outpatient visits of older Americans linked to data on daily rainfall showed no relation between rainfall and outpatient visits for joint or back pain... This was the case both among the older overall population and among patients with rheumatoid arthritis in particular.

According to the Mayo Clinic, migraines may be triggered by certain changes in the weather. The NHS says "...weather changes are thought to trigger chemical and electrical changes in the brain. This irritates nerves, leading to a headache." A 2023 study published in the journal of the American Headache Society found that "low barometric pressure, barometric pressure changes, higher humidity, and rainfall were associated with an increased number of headache occurrences".

== See also ==
- Climatotherapy
- Thunderstorm asthma
