= Rudin, Koshkuiyeh =

Rudin رودين
- Village
- Location within Iran
- Coordinates: 30°21′56″N 55°23′24″E
- Country: Iran
- Province: Kerman
- County: Rafsanjan
- Bakhsh: Koshkuiyeh
- Rural District: Raviz

Population (2006)
  - Total: 161
- Time zone: UTC+3:30 (IRST)
  - Summer (DST): UTC+4:30 (IRDT)

Rudin (Persian: رودين, also Romanized as Rūdīn; also known as Rūdī) is a village in Raviz Rural District, Koshkuiyeh District, Rafsanjan County, Kerman Province, Iran. At the 2006 census, its population was 161, in 56 families.
