= Borshchyovo =

Borshchyovo Борщёво
- Selo
- Location within Voronezh Oblast Location within Russia
- Coordinates: 51°41′N 40°29′E
- Country: Russia
- Region: Voronezh Oblast
- District: Paninsky District
- Time zone: UTC+3:00

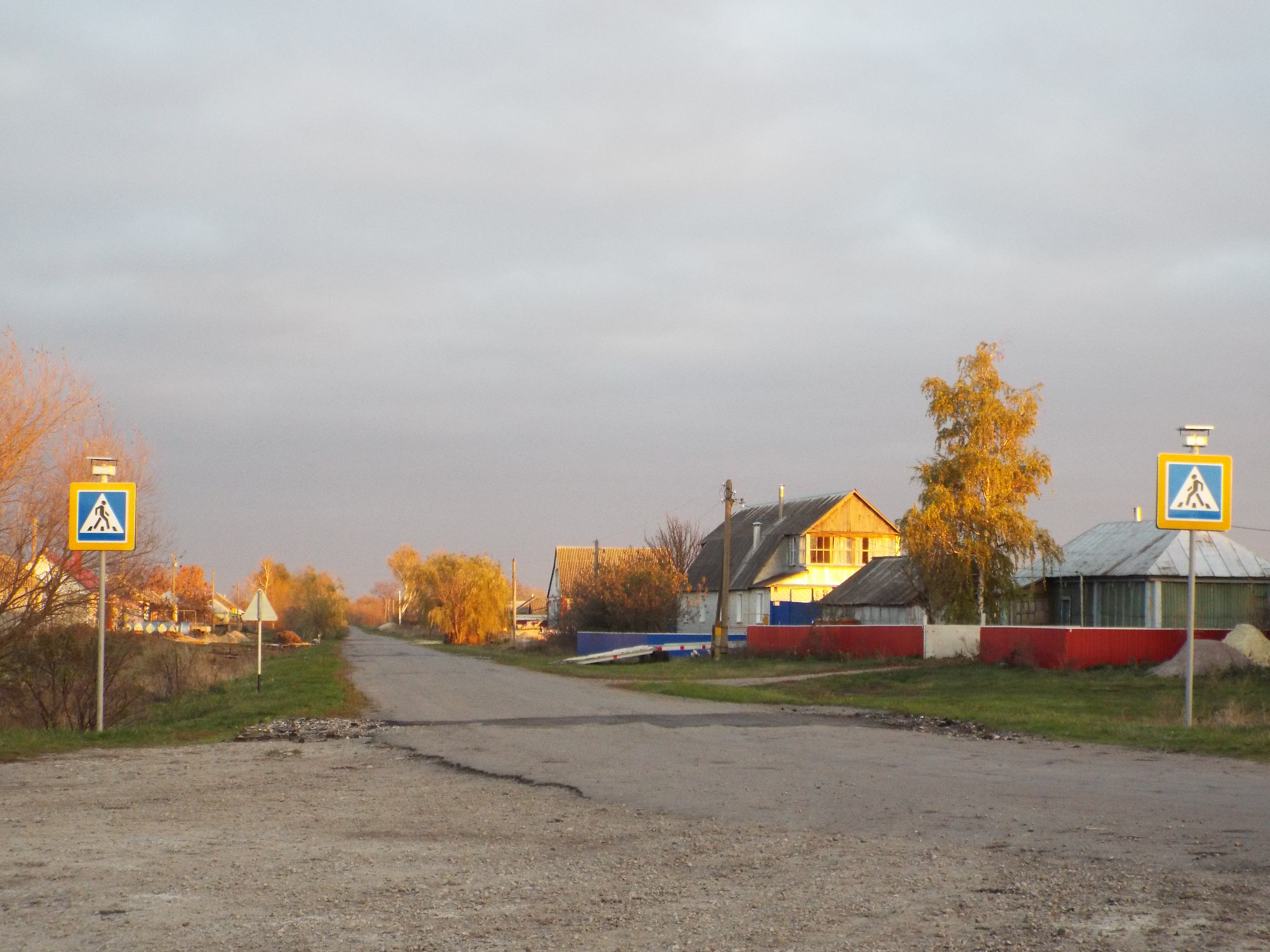
Tereshkovoi Street in Borshchyovo.

Borshchyovo (Russian: Борщёво) is a rural locality (a selo) in Progressovskoye Rural Settlement, Paninsky District, Voronezh Oblast, Russia. The population was 357 as of 2010. There are 8 streets.

== Geography ==
Borshchyovo is located on the right bank of the Bityug River, 33 km northeast of Panino (the district's administrative centre) by road. Borshchevskiye Peski is the nearest rural locality.
