= Rudik-e Sahebdad =

Rudik-e Sahebdad روديك صاحبداد
- Village
- Location within Iran
- Coordinates: 25°15′22″N 61°07′04″E
- Country: Iran
- Province: Sistan and Baluchestan
- County: Chabahar
- Bakhsh: Dashtiari
- Rural District: Negur

Population (2006)
  - Total: 38
- Time zone: UTC+3:30 (IRST)
  - Summer (DST): UTC+4:30 (IRDT)

Rudik-e Sahebdad (Persian: روديك صاحبداد, also Romanized as Rūdīk-e Şāḩebdād; also known as Rūdīg-e Şāḩebdād and Rūdīk-e Pā’īn) is a village in Negur Rural District, Dashtiari District, Chabahar County, Sistan and Baluchestan Province, Iran. At the 2006 census, its population was 38, in 6 families.
