= Vladimir Kostenko =

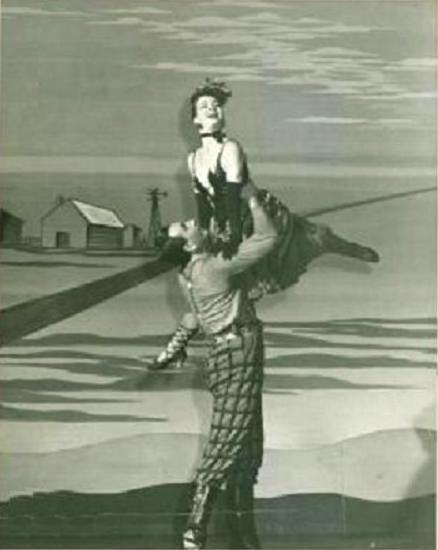
- NYPD Digital Collection
- Born: June 11, 1903; Kiev, Ukraine, Russian Empire
- Died: November 7, 1967 (aged 64); San Francisco, California, U.S.A.
- Occupations: Ballet Dancer and Teacher
- Writing career
- Years active: 1938 - 1967

Vladimir Kostenko (Ukrainian, Володимир Костенко, Russian, Владимир Костенко) (June 11, 1903 – November 7, 1967) was a Ukrainian-born American ballet dancer primarily remembered for his long association with the Rodgers and Hammerstein musical Oklahoma!.

== Life and career ==
Kostenko was born on June 11, 1903, near the city of Kiev, Russian Empire (an area that is today part of Ukraine). He emigrated to the U.S. in 1938.

Soon after his arrival, he began performing with the Ballet Russe de Monte Carlo under the directorship of Léonide Massine. In February 1940, Kostenko married ballerina Maria Nikolaevna Korjinska (1916–1994), a native Muscovite, while the Ballet Russe de Monte Carlo was touring the American West Coast.

Kostenko took over the role of Dream Jud on June 1, 1943, after George Church left the cast of Oklahoma! just two months into the musical's long run. Church had let the show’s producers know, months earlier, that he wanted to leave, but he was persuaded to stay past the show’s Broadway premier. Kostenko continued to play the part of Dream Jud on Broadway for the following six years before reprising the role in London and later in touring productions across America. During the musical’s long run Kostenko also filled in to play the part of Jess and as supervisor of ballet. His wife Maria also joined the cast of Oklahoma for its entire Broadway run and later as one of the postcard dancers.

In the early 1950s, Kostenko became the director of the San Francisco Studio of Ballet Art, located in the city’s Castro district, where he influenced a number of future performers. Kostenko spent the rest of his life living in the San Francisco Bay Area, becoming an American citizen in 1952 and performing demonstration ballet shows at a various civic functions.

== Death ==
He died on November 7, 1967, in San Francisco at the age of sixty-four.
