= Kostyonki, Voronezh Oblast =

Kostyonki Костёнки
- Selo
- Interactive map of Kostyonki
- Location of Kostyonki Kostyonki (Voronezh Oblast)
- Coordinates: 51°24′N 39°02′E
- Country: Russia
- Federal subject: Voronezh Oblast
- Administrative district: Khokholsky District

Population (2010 Census)
  - Total: 1,438
  - Estimate (2010): 1,438 (0%)
- Time zone: UTC+3 (MSK)
- Postal code: 3940xx
- Dialing code: +7 47371
- OKTMO ID: 20656424101

Kostyonki (Russian: Костёнки, lit. "small bones"), also spelled Kostenki, is a rural locality (a selo) in Khokholsky District of Voronezh Oblast, Russia, located on western middle bank of the Don River.

It is known for its archaeological sites with a high concentration of cultural remains of anatomically modern humans from the beginning of the Upper Paleolithic era.
