= Rudik-e Mahmud-e Pain =

Rudik-e Mahmud-e Pain روديك محمودپائين
- Village
- Location within Iran
- Coordinates: 25°15′32″N 61°07′36″E
- Country: Iran
- Province: Sistan and Baluchestan
- County: Chabahar
- Bakhsh: Dashtiari
- Rural District: Negur

Population (2006)
  - Total: 226
- Time zone: UTC+3:30 (IRST)
  - Summer (DST): UTC+4:30 (IRDT)

Rudik-e Mahmud-e Pain (Persian: روديك محمودپائين, also Romanized as Rūdīk-e Maḩmūd-e Pā’īn; also known as Rūdīg-e Mollā Maḩmūd) is a village in Negur Rural District, Dashtiari District, Chabahar County, Sistan and Baluchestan Province, Iran. At the 2006 census, its population was 226, in 29 families.
