= Natalya Kostenko =

Russian politician

- Наталья Костенко
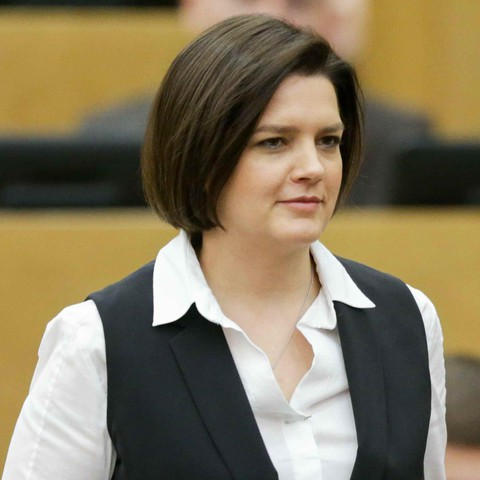

Deputy of the 8th State Duma
- Incumbent
- Assumed office 12 October 2021

Deputy of the 7th State Duma
- In office 5 October 2016 – 12 October 2021

Personal details
- Born: 9 August 1980 (age 46) Malotenginskaya, Krasnodar Krai, Russia, USSR
- Party: United Russia
- Education: Kuban State University

Natalya Kostenko (Russian: Наталья Васильевна Костенко; born 9 August 1980, Malotenginskaya, Krasnodar Krai) is a Russian political figure and deputy of the 7th and 8th State Dumas.

== Career ==
In 2005, Kostenko moved to Moscow, where she started working as a political commentator for the Nezavisimaya Gazeta. From 2008 to 2013, Kostenko served as a Kremlin correspondent for the Vedomosti newspaper. In 2013, she started working at the Institute of Socio-Economic and Political Studies, where, as a deputy director, she interacted with the Federal Coordinating Committee of the All-Russia People's Front. Since 2013, she has been part of the central headquarters of the All-Russia People's Front. On 18 September 2016 she was elected deputy of the 7th State Duma from the Krasnodar Krai constituency. In 2021, she was re-elected for the 8th State Duma.

== Legislative Activities ==
From 2016 to 2019, during her tenure as a deputy of the State Duma of the 7th convocation, she co-authored 34 legislative initiatives and amendments to draft federal laws.

=== Sanctions ===
She was sanctioned by Canada under the Special Economic Measures Act (S.C. 1992, c. 17) in relation to the Russian invasion of Ukraine for Grave Breach of International Peace and Security, and by the UK government in 2022 in relation to Russo-Ukrainian War.

On 24 March 2022, the United States Treasury sanctioned her in response to the 2022 Russian invasion of Ukraine.
