= Rudik-e Karim Bakhsh =

Rudik-e Karim Bakhsh روديک کريم بخش
- Village
- Location within Iran
- Coordinates: 25°16′19″N 61°08′25″E
- Country: Iran
- Province: Sistan and Baluchestan
- County: Chabahar
- Bakhsh: Dashtiari
- Rural District: Negur

Population (2006)
  - Total: 452
- Time zone: UTC+3:30 (IRST)
  - Summer (DST): UTC+4:30 (IRDT)

Rudik-e Karim Bakhsh (Persian: روديک کريم بخش, also Romanized as Rūdīk-e Karīm Bakhsh and Rūdīk Karīm Bakhsh; also known as Rūdīg, Rūdīg-e Karīm Bakhsh, Rūdīk-e Bālā, Rūdī-ye Bālā, and Rūdi-ye Şaḩebdār) is a village in Negur Rural District, Dashtiari District, Chabahar County, Sistan and Baluchestan Province, Iran. At the 2006 census, its population was 452, in 76 families.
