= Baia de Fier =

- Commune
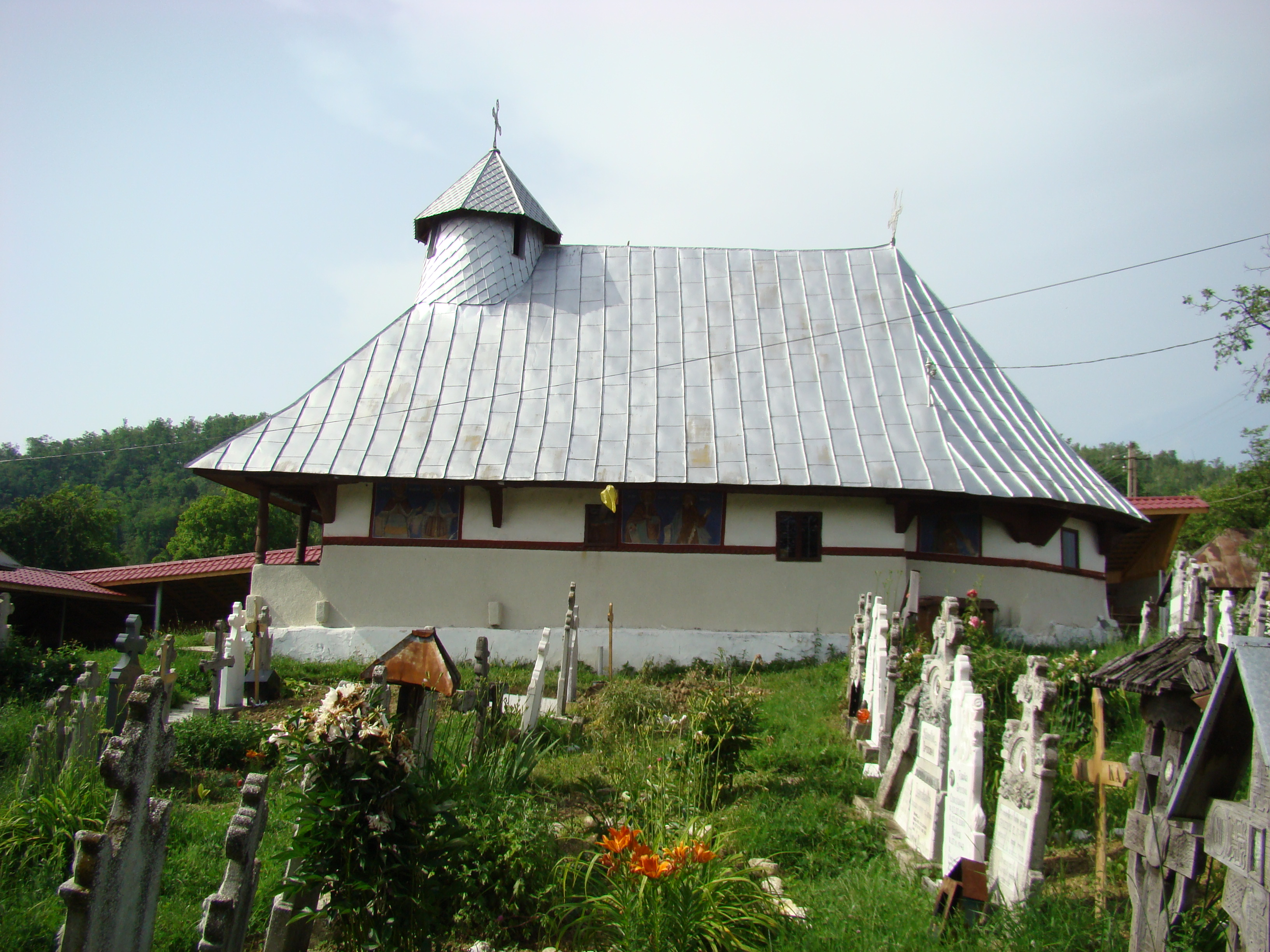
- Church in Cernădia

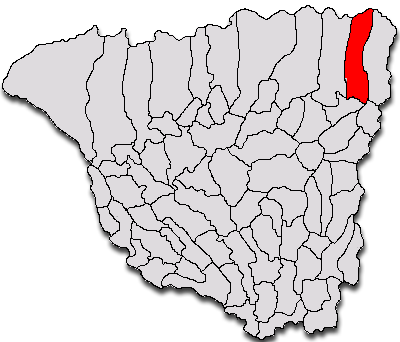
- Location in Gorj County

- Location in Romania
- Coordinates: 45°10′N 23°46′E
- Country: Romania
- County: Gorj
- Subdivisions: Baia de Fier, Cernădia

Government
  - Mayor (2020–2024): Dumitru Turbăceanu (PSD)
- Area: 120.25 km^{2} (46.43 sq mi)
- Elevation: 568 m (1,864 ft)
- Population (2021-12-01): 3,832
  - Density: 31.87/km^{2} (82.54/sq mi)
- Time zone: UTC+02:00 (EET)
  - Summer (DST): UTC+03:00 (EEST)
- Postal code: 217130
- Area code: +(40) x53
- Vehicle reg.: GJ
- Website: www.pbf.ro

Baia de Fier is a commune in Gorj County, Oltenia, Romania. It is composed of two villages, Baia de Fier and Cernădia. It is traversed by the river Pârâul Galben; to the east flows the river Olteț. Peștera Muierilor (women's cave) is located here.

The first (and only) graphite mine in Romania opened in Baia de Fier in 1945; by the 1980s, several hundred miners worked there, but the mine was closed in 1999, following devastating floods. As of 2025, exploitation of this graphite deposit (the largest of its kind in Europe) is set to resume, thanks to nearly €200 million in funding from the European Commission. Graphite extraction at Baia de Fier will be prioritized for its applications in electric vehicle batteries, energy storage, electronics, and machine manufacturing.

Baia de Fier is a sister city to Boccioleto, Italy since 2007.
