= Rudy =

Rudy or Rudi is a masculine given name, sometimes short for Rudolf, Rudolph, Rawad, Rudra, Ruairidh, or variations thereof, a nickname and a surname which may refer to:

== People ==
=== Given name or nickname ===
- Rudy Adrian (born 1965), New Zealand ambient musician
- Rudy Andeweg (born 1952), Dutch political scientist
- Rudi Assauer (1944–2019), German football manager and player
- Rudy Ballieux (1930–2020), Dutch immunologist
- Rudy Bowman (1890–1972), American actor
- Rudi Čajavec (1911–1942), Yugoslav Partisan pilot and National Hero
- Rudi Carrell (1934–2006), Dutch television entertainer
- Rudy Clavel (born 1996), Salvadoran footballer
- Rudy D'Amico (born 1940), American National Basketball Association scout, and former college and professional basketball coach
- Rudy Demotte (born 1963), Belgian politician
- Rudi Dil, birth name of Ruud Gullit (born 1962), Dutch retired football manager and player
- Rudi Dolezal (born 1958), Austrian film director and film producer
- Rudi Dornbusch (1942–2002), German economist
- Rudi Dutschke (1940–1979), the most prominent spokesperson of the 1960s German student movement
- Rudy Florio (born 1950), Canadian football player
- Rudy Ford (born 1994), American football player
- Rudy Galindo (born 1969), American retired figure skater
- Rudi Garcia (born 1964), French football manager and former player
- Rudy Gay (born 1986), American basketball player
- Rudi Gernreich (1922–1985), Austrian-born American fashion designer
- Rudy Giuliani (born 1944), former US Associate Attorney General and former Mayor of New York City
- Rudy Gobert (born 1992), French basketball player
- Rudy Haddad (born 1985), French-Israeli football player
- Rudy Horn (1933–2018), German juggler
- Rudy Kennedy (1927–2008), British rocket scientist and Holocaust survivor and activist
- Rudy LaRusso (1937–2004), American basketball player
- Rudy Linka (born 1960), Czech-American jazz guitarist
- Rudy Pankow (born 1998), American actor
- Rudy Ruettiger (born 1948), American football player, motivational speaker, and inspiration for the film Rudy
- Rudy Sikich (1921–1998), American National Football League player
- Rudi Skácel (born 1979), Czech footballer
- Rudi Spring (1962–2025), German composer, pianist and academic
- Rudi Tröger (1929–2025), German painter and academic
- Rudy Trouvé (born 1967), Belgian musician
- Rudy Turk (1927–2007), American museum director, curator, painter
- Rudy Vallée (1901–1986), American singer, actor and bandleader, one of the first modern pop stars
- Rudi Vis (1941–2010), Dutch-born British politician and Member of Parliament
- Rudi Völler (born 1960), German retired football manager and player
- Rudolf Vrba (1924–2006), Slovak-Jewish biochemist, Auschwitz concentration camp escapee who co-wrote a report of the mass murders being committed there
- Rudi Weissenstein (1910–1992), Israeli photographer
- Rudi Widodo (born 1983), Indonesian footballer
- Rudy Wiedoeft (1893–1940), American saxophonist
- Rudi Ying (born 1998), Chinese ice hockey player
- Rudy York (1913–1970), American Major League Baseball player

=== Alias or stage name ===
- Jan Bytnar, nom de guerre Rudy (1921–1943), Polish resistance fighter
- Rudi Carrell, Dutch entertainer born Rudolf Wijbrand Kesselaar (1934–2006)
- Rudy de Mérode, real name Frédéric Martin (1905–?), French collaborator in the Second World War
- Rudy Grayzell, stage name of American rockabilly musician Rudolph Paiz Jimenez (1933–2019)
- Rudi (spiritual teacher), American entrepreneur and Hindu spiritual teacher Albert Rudolph (1928–1973)

=== Surname ===
- Andrzej Rudy (born 1965), Polish footballer
- Florian Rudy (born 1989), German footballer
- Gherasim Rudi (1907–1982), Prime Minister of the Moldovan SSR
- Henry Rudi (1889–1970), Norwegian huntsman and polar bear hunter
- Joe Rudi (born 1946), American former Major League Baseball player
- Kathy Rudy (born 1956), American women's studies scholar and theologian
- Michał Radziwiłł Rudy (1870–1950), German-Polish diplomat and nobleman
- Mikhail Rudy (born 1953), Russian-French pianist
- Rajiv Pratap Rudy (born 1962), Indian politician
- Ruth Rudy (born 1938), American politician
- Sebastian Rudy (born 1990), German footballer
- Steven Rudy (born 1978), American politician and businessman

== Fictional characters ==
- Rudy Cooper, aka Brian Moser in the Dexter television series
- Rudi van DiSarzio, a psychedelic monk in The Mighty Boosh
- Rudi Gunn, in the Dirk Pitt adventure novels by Clive Cussler
- Rudeus Greyrat, the main character of the Japanese light novel Mushoku Tensei
- Rudolph "Rudy" Holiday, from the videogame Deltarune
- Rudy Huxtable, in the American sitcom The Cosby Show
- Rudy Jones, the best-known incarnation of the Parasite (character), a DC Comics villain
- Rudy Pipilo, a gangster in the American drama series The Deuce
- Rudy Steiner, from The Book Thief
- Rudy Tabootie, in the animated series ChalkZone
- Rudy Wade, in the British science fiction TV series Misfits
- Rudy Wells, a scientist in the American TV series The Six Million Dollar Man
- Rudy, Abby's stepbrother on Sesame Street
- Rudy, in season two of the Pokémon anime series
- Rudy, in the 2009 animated film Ice Age: Dawn of the Dinosaurs
- R.U.D.I, George Jetson's work computer in the animated TV series The Jetsons
- Baron Rudi, in Austrian humor
- Regular-Sized Rudy (born Rudolph Stieblitz), a supporting character in the animated series Bob's Burgers
- Rudy, a Frankfurt body, who plays a street barrel-organ in the Heidi television series

== See also ==
- Rudolph (name)
