= Rudik-e Molladad =

Rudik-e Molladad روديك ملاداد
- Village
- Location within Iran
- Coordinates: 25°15′21″N 61°07′46″E
- Country: Iran
- Province: Sistan and Baluchestan
- County: Chabahar
- Bakhsh: Dashtiari
- Rural District: Negur

Population (2006)
  - Total: 556
- Time zone: UTC+3:30 (IRST)
  - Summer (DST): UTC+4:30 (IRDT)

Rudik-e Molladad (Persian: روديك ملاداد, also Romanized as Rūdīk-e Mollādād; also known as Rūdi, Rūdīg, Rūdīg-e Shīrān, Rūdīg Shīrān, Rūdīk, and Rūdīk-e Shīrān) is a village in Negur Rural District, Dashtiari District, Chabahar County, Sistan and Baluchestan Province, Iran. At the 2006 census, its population was 556, in 88 families.
