= Bumbești-Pițic =

- Commune
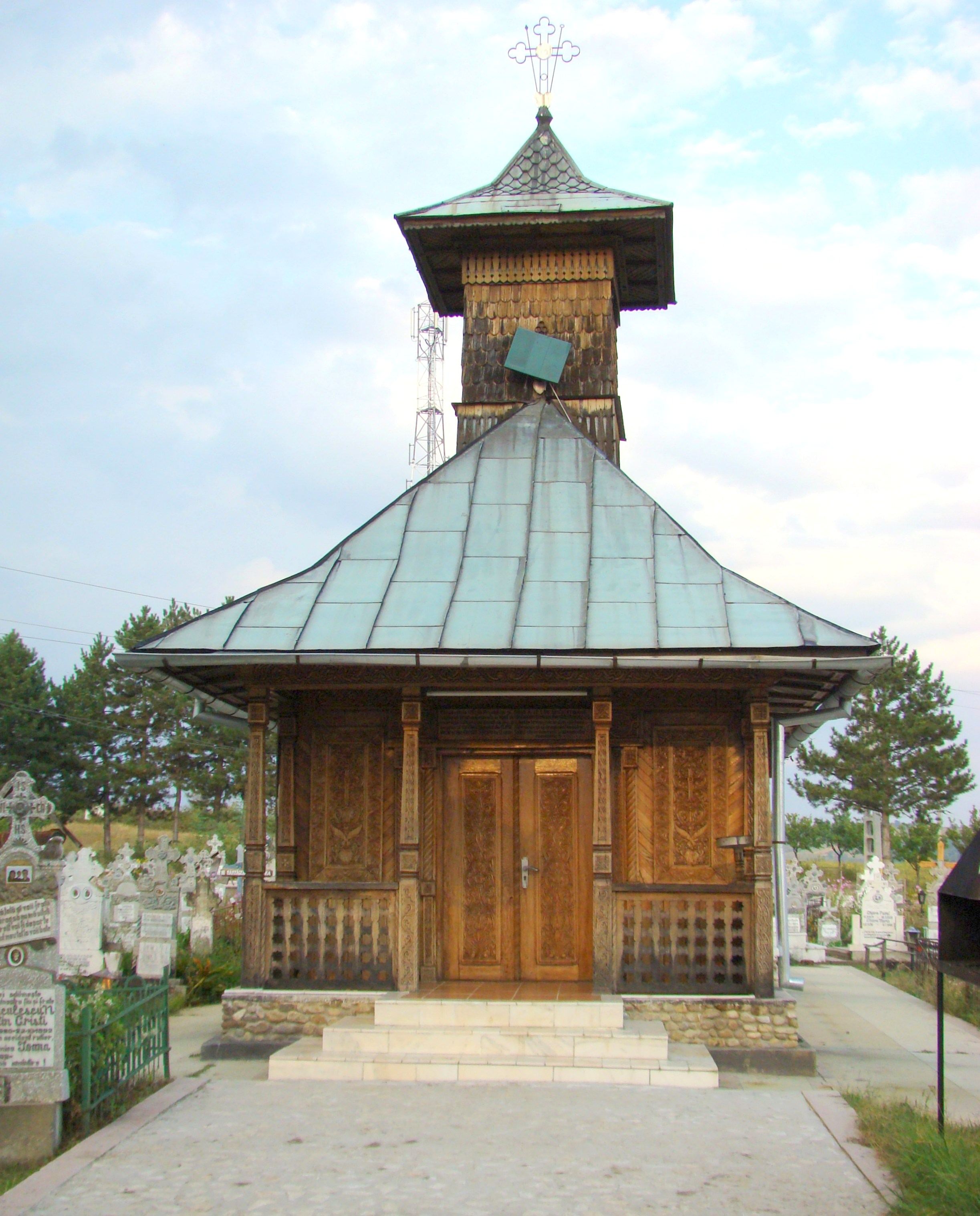
- Wooden church in Bumbești-Pițic

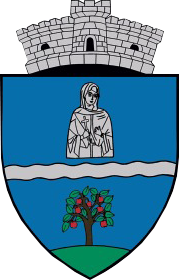
- Coat of arms

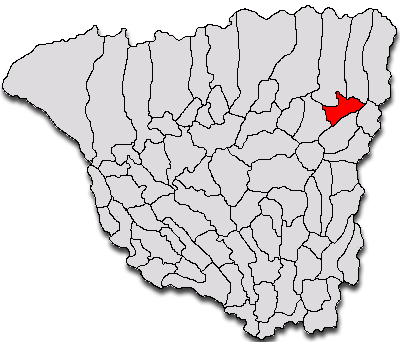
- Location in Gorj County

- Location in Romania
- Coordinates: 45°07′N 23°40′E
- Country: Romania
- County: Gorj
- Subdivisions: Bumbești-Pițic, Cârligei, Poienari

Government
  - Mayor (2021–2024): Irina Cojocaru (PNL)
- Area: 36.79 km^{2} (14.20 sq mi)
- Elevation: 425 m (1,394 ft)
- Highest elevation: 500 m (1,600 ft)
- Lowest elevation: 242 m (794 ft)
- Population (2021-12-01): 2,028
  - Density: 55.12/km^{2} (142.8/sq mi)
- Time zone: UTC+02:00 (EET)
  - Summer (DST): UTC+03:00 (EEST)
- Postal code: 21711X
- Area code: +(40) x53
- Vehicle reg.: GJ
- Website: comunabumbestipitic.ro

Bumbești-Pițic is a commune in Gorj County, Oltenia, Romania. It is composed of three villages: Bumbești-Pițic, Cârligei, and Poienari.
