= Climatotherapy =

- MeSH: D013790

Climatotherapy refers to temporary or permanent relocation of a patient to a region with a climate more favourable to recovery from or management of a condition. Examples include:

- The partial pressure of oxygen is lower at high altitude, so a person with sickle cell disease might move to a lower altitude to reduce the number of sickle crises.
- Several sites around the world are advertised or studied as possibly of therapeutic benefit to patients with psoriasis, most notably the Dead Sea region.

== See also ==
- Weather pains
- Meteoropathy
- Thalassotherapy
