= Tejaban =

Pakistani village

- Village
- Location within Pakistan
- Coordinates: 26°0′15″N 63°3′38″E
- Country: Pakistan
- Province: Balochistan
- District: Kech District
- Tehsil: Turbat Tehsil

Area
  - Total: 75 km^{2} (29 sq mi)
- Elevation: 129 m (423 ft)

Population
  - Total: 3,500
  - Density: 10/km^{2} (26/sq mi)
- Time zone: UTC+5 (PST)
- Calling code: 0852

Tejaban is a village located in Balochistan, Pakistan. It lies 70 km from Turbat, near the Kuss river. The river provides a primary source of water for agricultural in the area comes from GUDAN enabling local farming activities. The absence of adequate flood-control infrastructure has made Tejaban vulnerable to seasonal flooding. The name Tejaban is derived from a local term meaning "abundance of water."

The village is situated between the settlements of Hironk and Hoshab and is surrounded by mountainous terrain and river systems.

== Agricultural activities ==
Agriculture is the main output of Tejaban. Water for agriculture is allocated through the Karez System. Some of the agricultural lands are owner-cultivated while others are given to 2nd parties on shared basis. The share of owner is 2/3 while the share of cultivator remains 1/3.

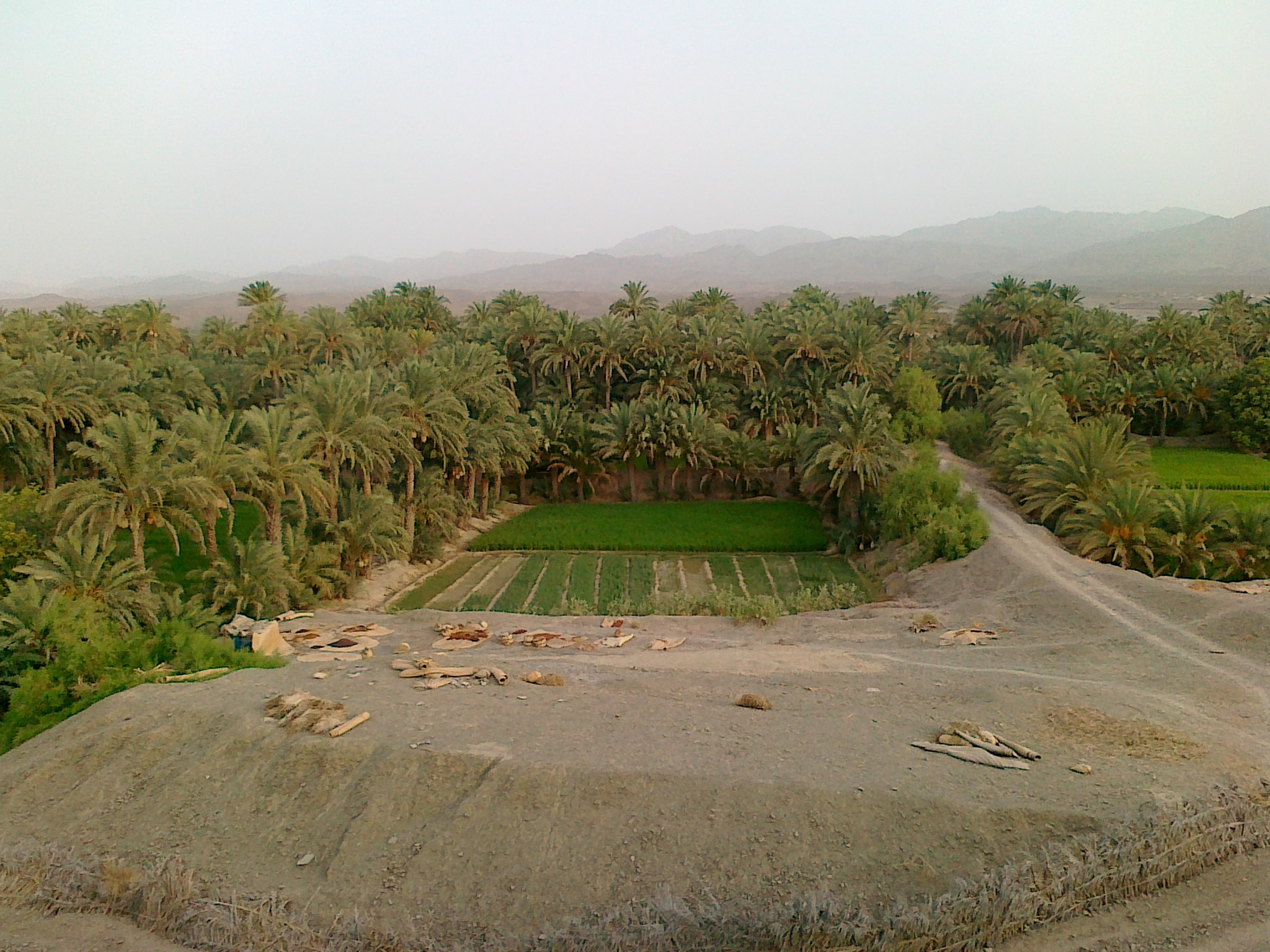

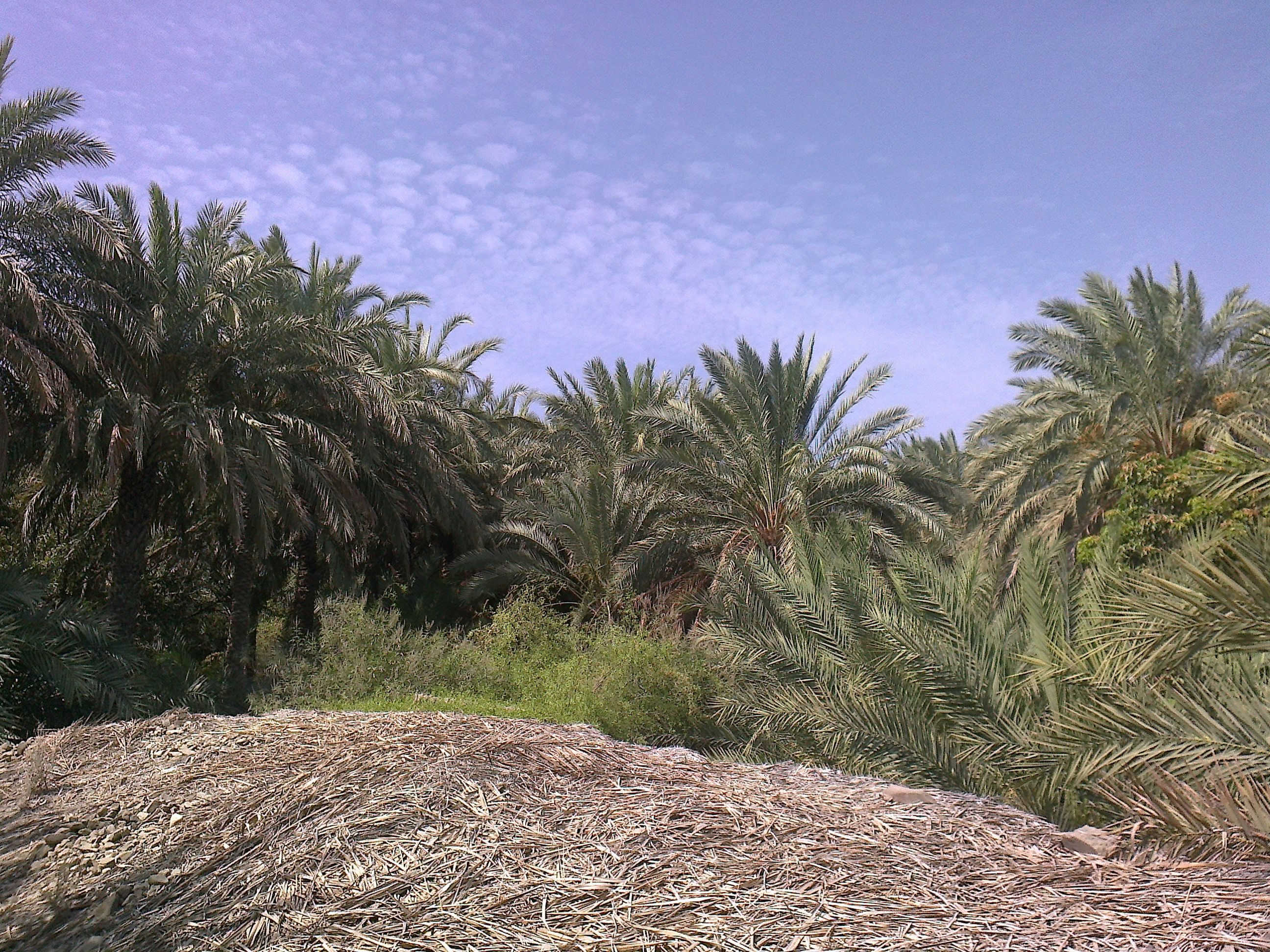

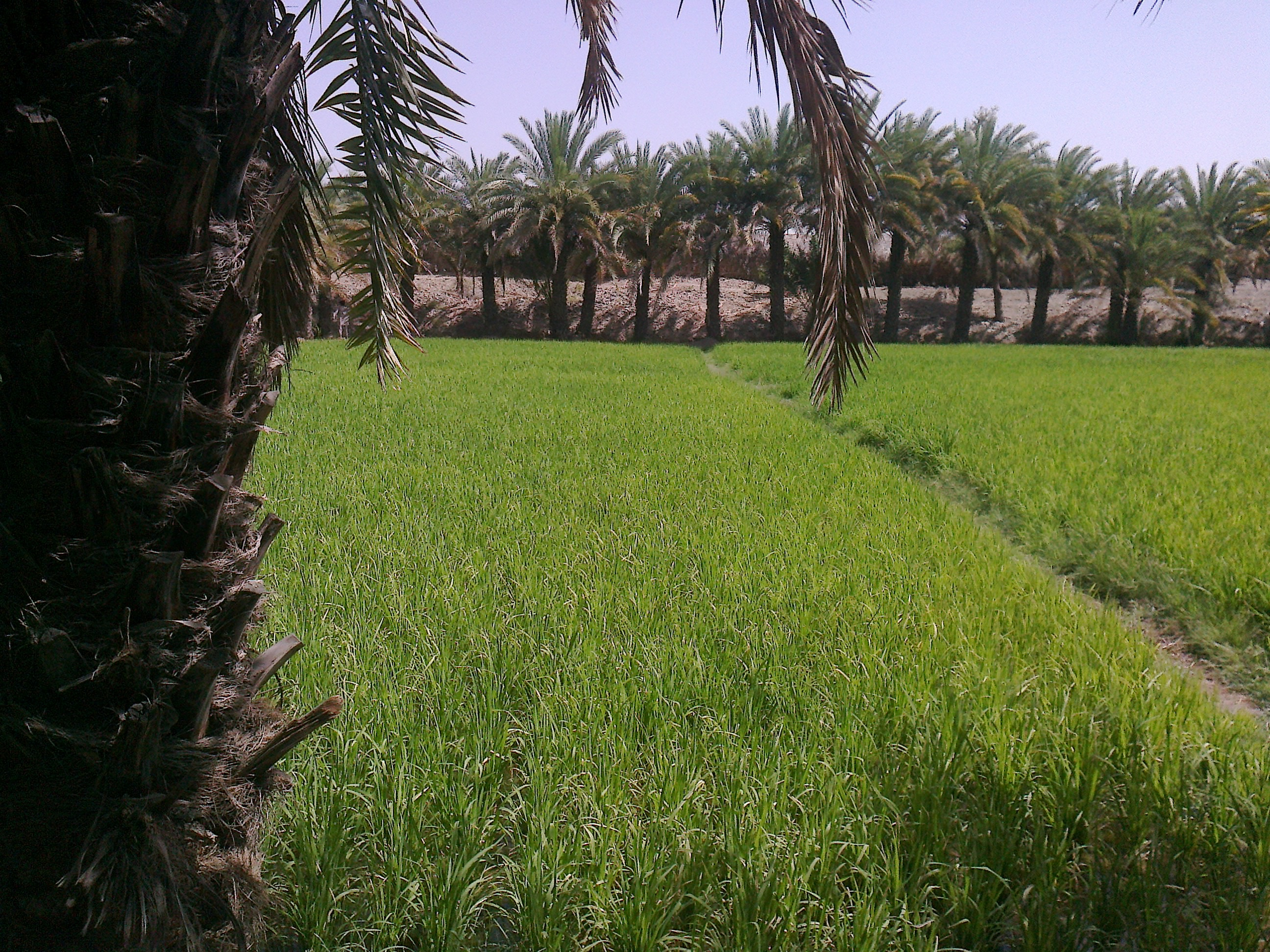

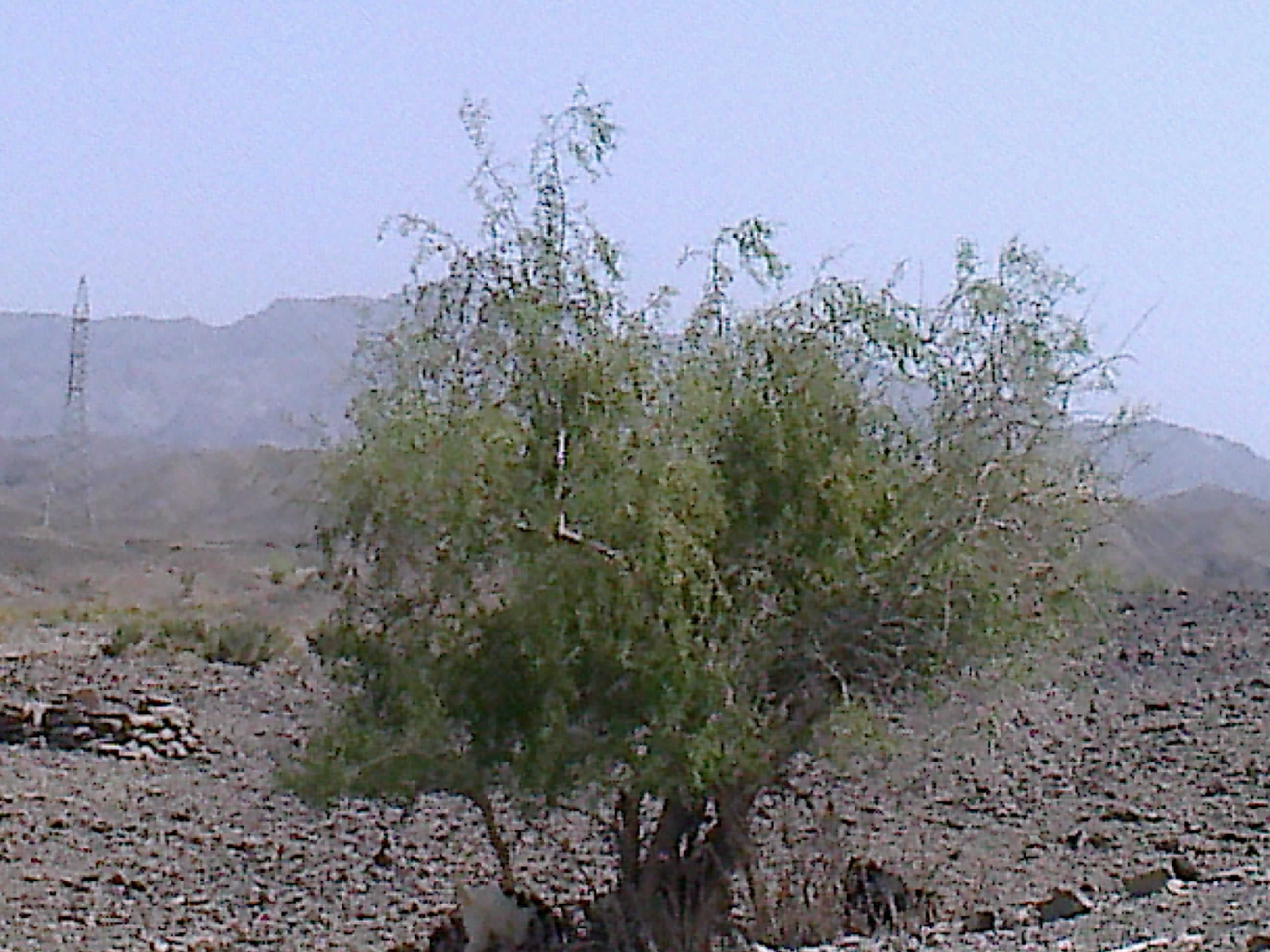

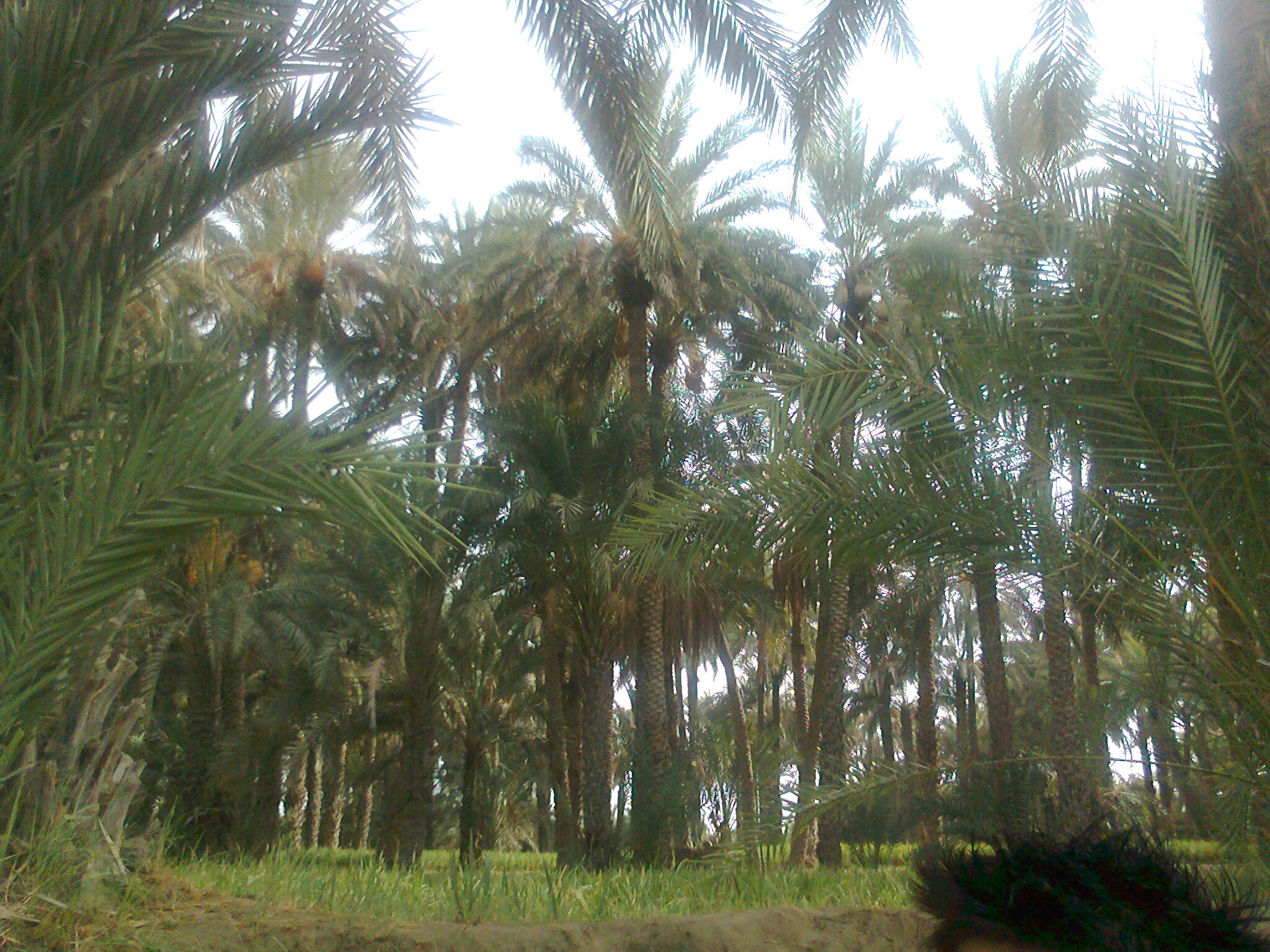

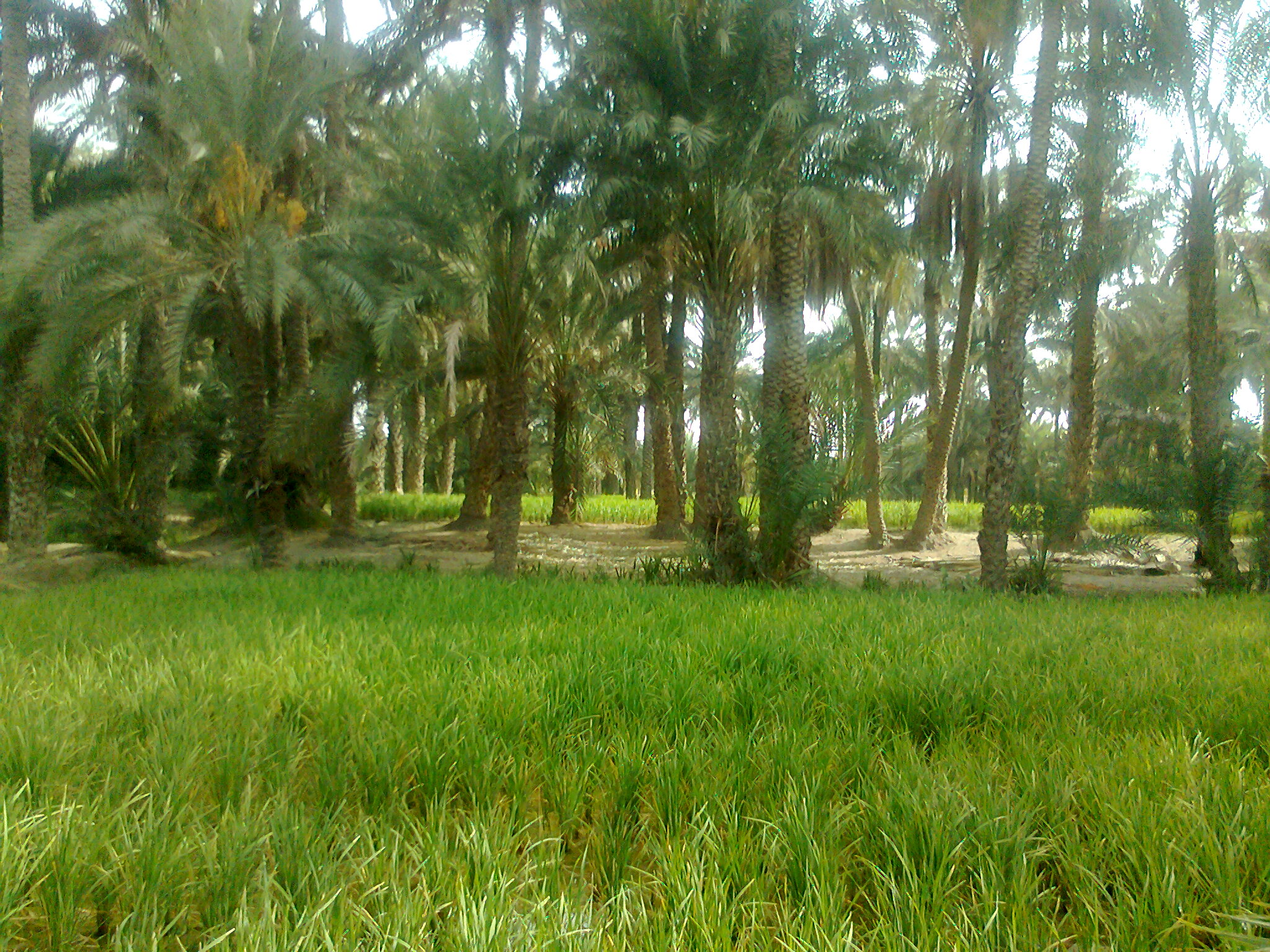

=== Kinds of crops collected ===
Various crops are cultivated in Tejaban. The list of crops being cultivated is long but some popular crops are rice, date, bakla, wheat, and onion. All these crops are produced in bulk quantities but the specialty of Tejaban are dates. The cultivation of wheat is totally dependent on rains as it is cultivated in bands (Bands are agricultural lands which are not connected to Karez system and watering of these lands is done directly from river). In the absence of rains, the level of the water becomes very low and sometimes is zero. Due to this, much of the time the farmers are unable to cultivate wheat.

=== Processing of dates ===
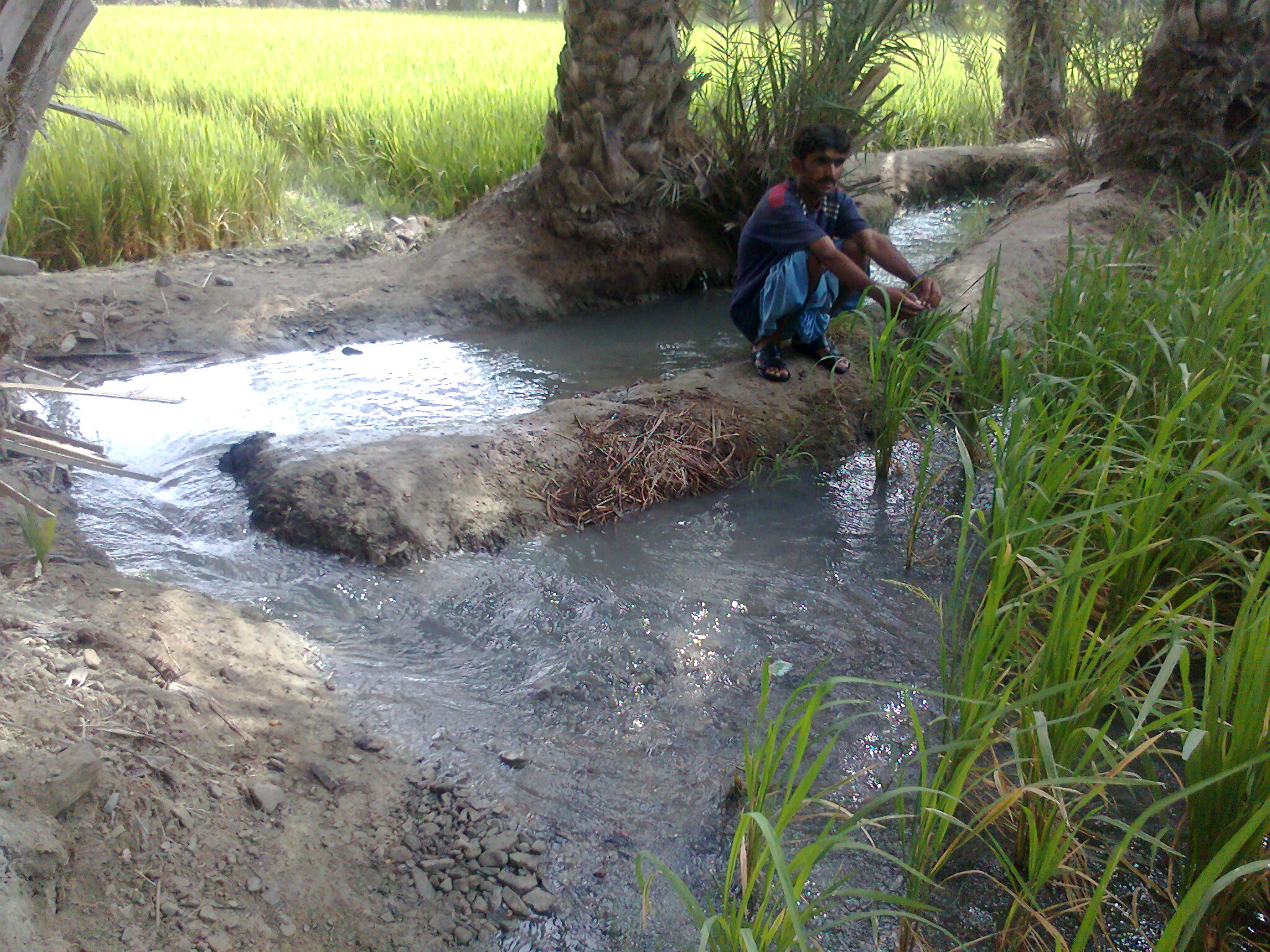
Water channels for date cultivation

Date season (from May to August) is very much enjoyed, especially by the children as it is their vocations. People from many areas come to Tejaban for Aamin (the process of collecting dates is called Aamin). They live in temporary camps and return to their homelands as soon as date season comes to an end. They welcome people coming from various areas for Aamin (date season).

Many kinds of dates are produced including Begam-jangi, Haleeni, Mozzati, Rogheni, Peeshna, Shakari, Gog-na, Aap e dandan, Kongo, and Chapshok. These dates are sold in big markets. Main markets are Karachi and Quetta.

Types of Dates	1. Begam-Jangi	2. Haleeni	3. Mozzati	4. Rogheni	5. Peeshna	6. Shakari	7. Gog-na	8. Aap a Dandan	9. Kongo	10. Chapshok	11. Shakarok	12. Konzen-bad

=== Karez System ===
In Tejaban agricultural water is accomplished through the Karez System. Karez is a local system in which a large number of wells are interconnected to collect and share water. Water flows in the form of channels, which is then used for farming. This system is energy-efficient. No fuel is used for collecting water, unlike tube-wells.

The main Karez (Kahn) are Peerin Kahn, Gul Mohd e Kahn, Chammagan, Jumma kahn, Peer Mohd Kahn, Sabzal e Kahn and Meer e Khan. The oldest one is Peerin kahn. At one time the water was divided among the former on the basis of Taas (a type of bowl having a hole in the bottom). Taas was put into water and the time for one getting water changed as the Taas filled up. But now watches replaced that system.

List of Karezes	1. Peerin Kahn	2. Gul Mohd Kahn	3. Chamagan a Kahn	4. Peer Mohd Kahn	5. Sabzal e Kahn	6. Meer a Kahn

== Culture ==
100% of the population speaks the Balochi language and their religion is Islam. Most of the people and especially the older ones have chador on their shoulders and pag on their heads. These are the symbol of Balochi culture of the Baloch people. The younger ones wear long salwar and small kameez. Some even have chador on shoulders as well. They wear full Balochi dresses. These dresses may be full of embroidery.

== Education and health ==
There are three Primary schools (two for boys and one for girls) and one High school. There are no hospitals. A rest house was provided to Tejaban but with no facilities.

== Hunting ==
Hunting is a popular sport in Tejaban. Some of Hunting Points are Tejaban a mulk, Seheen Kahoor, Kalgalo, Rongan e Aap, Gwapi e Aap, Sore Aap and Karki Jangle. The best hunting period is August to October. It is the period when Rice, date and Wheat crops become ready. The birds are hunted when they come to eat these crops. Tejaban a mulk, Seheen Kahor and Kalgalo are the points where birds come to eat crops. Other points are the one where the birds come to quench their thrust. Rongan a aap, Gwapi a aap and Sor a aap are the points where birds come to drink water.

== Sub-areas of Tejaban ==
Main areas of Tejaban are Syed-Aabad, Meer Karim Bakhash Bazar, Faqeer Mohammad Bazar, Sing-Aabad and Karki. Some of small areas are Majboor Bazar, Gwarkopi Bazar, Dil Ganok and Aaptari. Tejaban is surrounded by a long range of mountains. The highest mountain ranges are Janzat and Mok e sar.

Sub areas of Tejaban	1.Mir Faqeer Mohd Bazar	2. Kareem Bakhsh Bazar	3. Mullah Bazar	4. Sing-abad	5. Karki	6. Majboor Bazar	7. Meer dilawar Bazar	8. Gwarkopi Bazar	9. Aaptari
