= Sassi Punnu Fort =

Historic fortification and archaeological site in Balochistan

Coordinates: 26.034°N 63.013°E

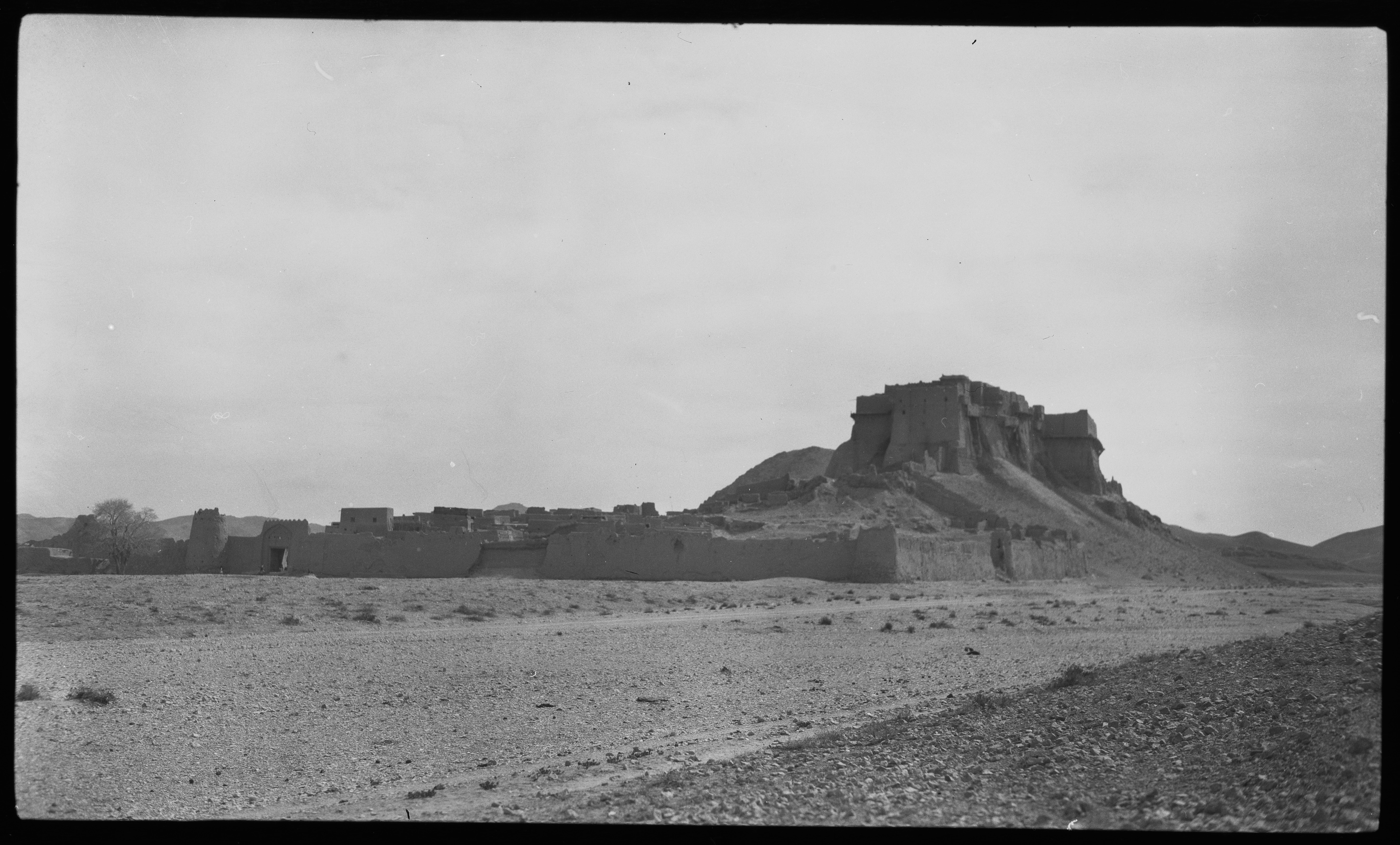
The site of Miri Qalat with the Islamic fortress.

Sassui Punnhu Fort (Sindhi: سسئي پنهون قلعو, Balochi: ساسی پینو قلعہ, pronounced [səˈsiː ˈpənʊ̃ː ˈqɪləʔ]), also known as Miri Kalat, is a historical fortification located near Turbat in Turbat Tehsil, Kech District, Balochistan, Pakistan. The site closely associated with the legendary love story of Sassui and Punnhu, a prominent tale in Sindhi and Balochi folklore.

Adjacent to the fort lies an ancient burial site, where several open graves containing human skeletons have been discovered, adding archaeological significance to the area. The fort and its surroundings are currently in a deteriorated state, with structural remnants at risk of complete disappearance if preservation measures are not taken.

The nearby Miri Qalat archaeological site, believed to be part of the broader historical complex, dates back to the 3rd millennium BCE. The name "Miri Kalat" translates to "Prince's Fortress," derived from Mir (a title of nobility with Arabic roots meaning "prince") and Qalat (from Arabic and Persian, meaning "fortress"). The site reflects both cultural heritage and early settlement patterns in the Makran region.

Situated in the larger region of Kech-Makran in the southwestern part of the Pakistani province of Balochistan, Miri Qalat is often regarded as "the most important archaeological site of the Kech Valley," although it represents only a small part of the entire region.

Archaeological excavation of the site of Miri Qalat took place during the late 20th century, initially revealing signs of settlement which consisted of mud-brick and stone structures. Through various dating methods, archaeologists dated the site to the beginnings of the Indus Valley Civilization (2500-1900 BCE), placing it in the second half of the 3rd millennium BC.

Led by archaeologist Roland Besenval, the excavation was aimed at understanding the site's strata along with its paleo-economical and paleo-environmental context. These findings are crucial for understanding the Chalcolithic and Bronze Age periods in South Asia, and provide insight on the region's first urban civilization.

The archaeological trench excavation not only led to a greater historical understanding of local tradition and its connection to Iranian culture, but also shed light on trade interactions within the region and with the Oman Peninsula.

== Location ==
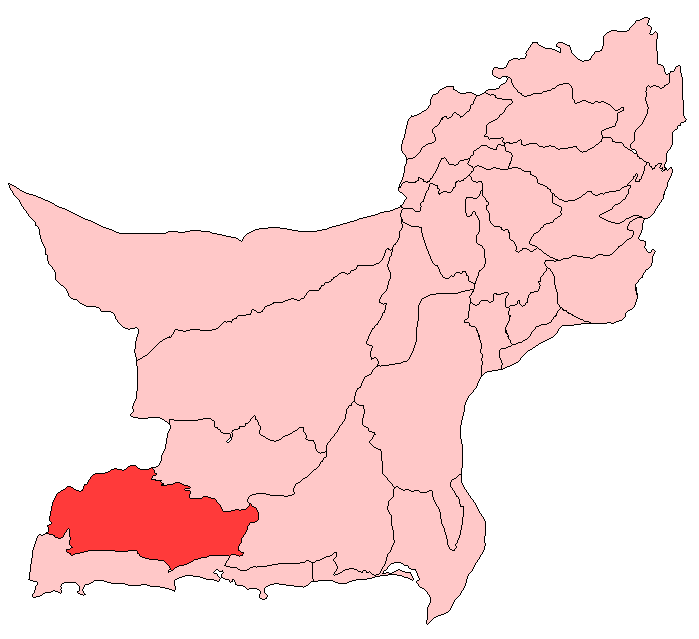
Map of Balochistan with the Kech region highlighted in a brighter red color.

The Sassui Punnhu fort (fortress town of Miri Qalat) is located at longitude 63°0' E and latitude 26°2'N, approximately 6 km northwest of the present day town of Turbat, in the Makran region of Pakistan's southwestern most province of Balochistan. It is on the bank of the Kech River.

== Geography, climate, topography ==
Topographically, the region comprises a series of low-lying yet rugged mountain ranges that are situated in an east-west direction, which geographically isolate a series of alluvial valleys. As in the past, even today, this geographical barrier is responsible for limiting human access and settlement within these valleys, despite the presence of fertile and arable soils and plentiful access to water sources.

The Kech Valley, one of these isolated regions, is a narrow, grove-like area where both summer and winter crops are grown and thrive, using the Balochi irrigating technique known as karez

Although geographically isolated, historically the Kech Valley has been home to human civilization. This is evidenced by the structural presence of the fortress town of Miri Qalat and the discovery of various man-made objects within this archaeological site.

The climate of the area, serves as an agricultural challenge as it is difficult to maintain crops in this hot and harsh valley climate surrounded by mountains. Moreover, the climate of Makran is particularly hot and arid. The average annual rainfall of this region, which is reflective of that of southern and western Pakistan as a whole - the country's most dry regions, is roughly 150 mm, making it one of the driest regions in Pakistan.

In Miri Qalat, the average yearly rainfall ranges from 100–130 mm, with a majority occurring during winter and spring, from December to April. As compared to the rest of Pakistan, the summer monsoon of July and August is less pronounced and thus adequate irrigation is absolutely necessary for the viability of agricultural products. Furthermore, rainfall within the region is quite sporadic with long periods of drought followed by heavy rains in addition to thunderstorms, with the majority of the whole year's rainfall occurring within the span of a few days.

Overall, the climate is also quite arid and hot, with winters averaging around 68 °F and summers averaging around 95 °F. Thus, vegetation is quite limited due to the rigidity of the climate and the harsh conditions of mountainous ridges.

== Excavation of the site ==
The archaeological site of Miri Qalat, located in the kech Valley in the Kech Valley in the Kech-Makran district of Balochistan, Pakistan, has been a significant focus of excavation and analysis.

Initially discovered and explored in 1927 by Hungarian-British archaeologist Aurel Stein, the site of Miri Qalat saw a series of excavations between the span of 7 years from 1990 to 1997, led by the French Archaeological Mission. This project was led by the French Archaeologist Roland Besenval, director and founder of Makran's French Archaeological mission from 1986 - 2012,. The excavation and research was all in collaboration with the Government of Pakistan's Department of Archaeology and Museums. While preliminary exploration was conducted by Stein, Besenval and his team later laid down eleven trenches during the seventh season of excavations in order to gather stratified data and identify the specific cultural phases from history present at the site of Miri Qalat.

During this archaeological mission, 228 site excavations, extensive surveys, and explorations were carried out throughout the entire region. Surface potsherds played a crucial role in dating the excavation sites, providing valuable insights into the region's history despite the challenges posted by the rigidity of the region's climate and topography.

Miri Qalat quickly emerged as the most important of these archaeological sites for historical understanding in this region. An extensive project was carried out in order to better understand its strata, along with its paleo-economical and paleo-environmental context. Dating of the surface potsherds found at the site indicated occupation during the protohistoric period, particularly in the Dasht plain, dating back to the 3rd millennium BC (2800 - 2500 BC).

Excavations at Miri Qalat were significant due to the signs of settlement found at the site. The decision to excavate Miri Qalat was based on its long occupation sequence, as evidenced by the surface materials found at the site. Although it has not yet been entirely excavated, five field-campaigns were conducted on six main trenches (I-IV, VII-X). These excavations, along with the discovery of the above mentioned potsherds among other artifacts, provided the first chrono-cultural sequence and dating for the region of Kech-Makran.

== Excavation findings ==
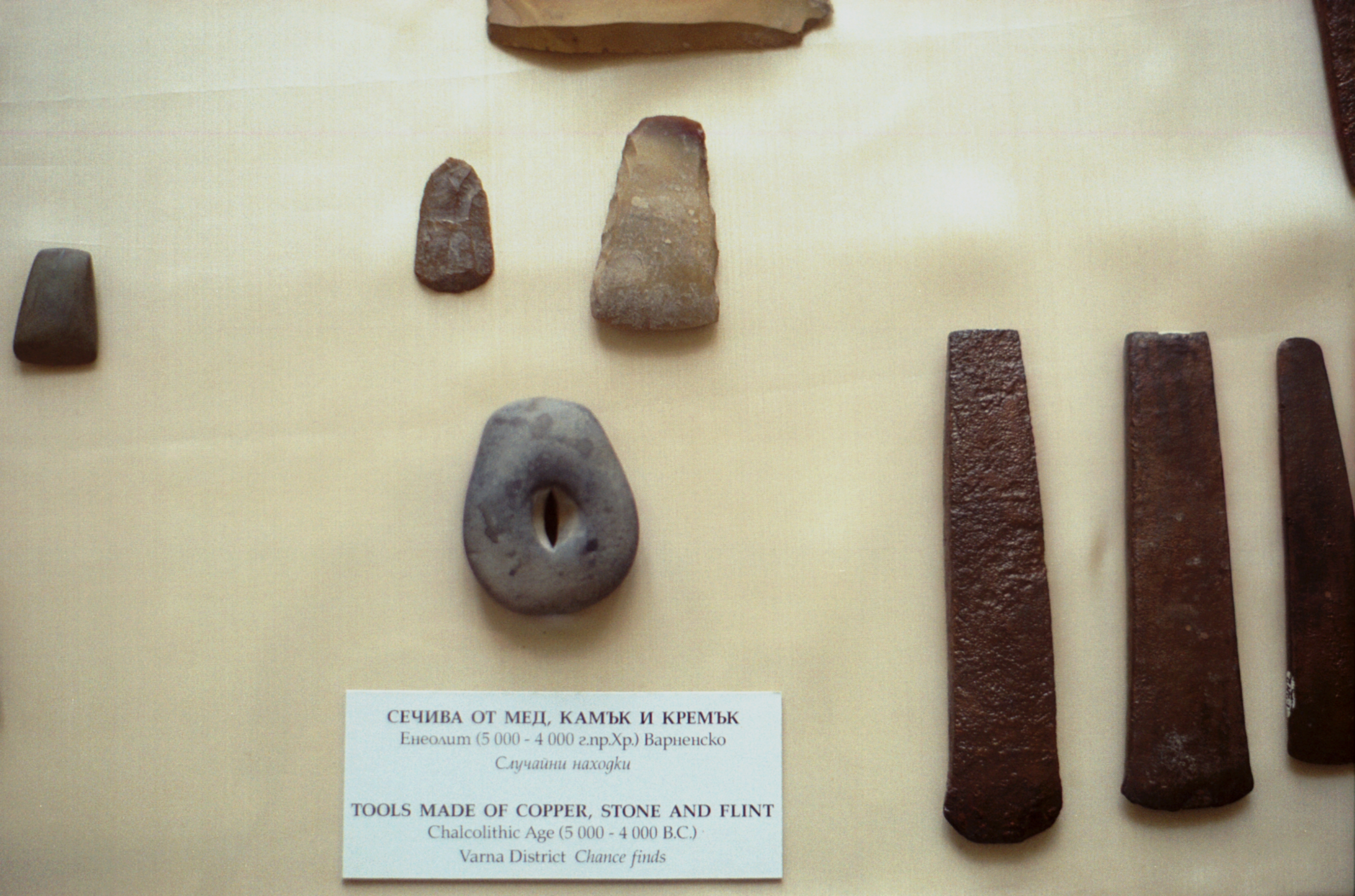
Chalcolithic period artifacts, specifically stone and copper tools.

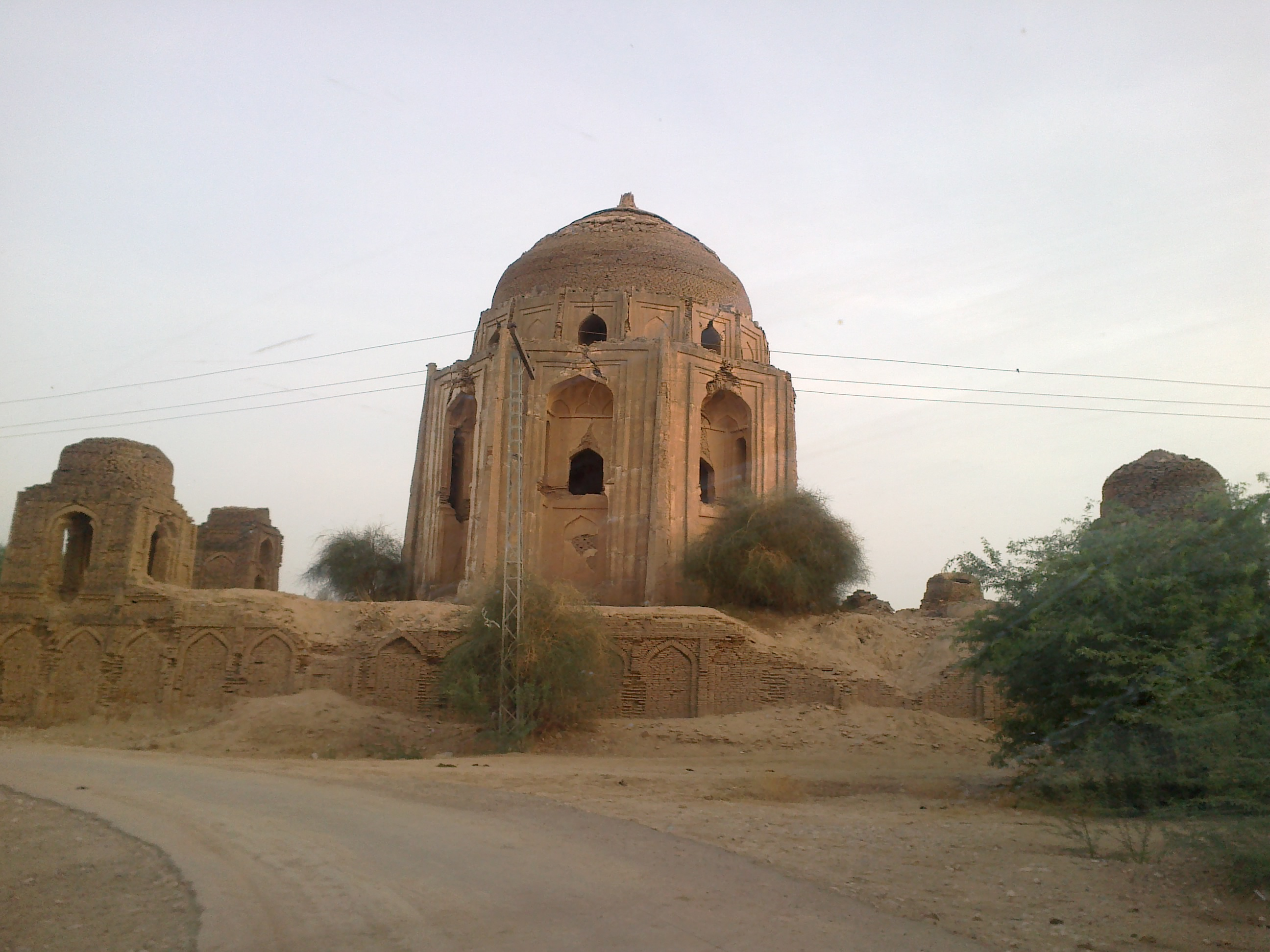
Ruins of the town of Turbat.

Besenval's decision to excavate the site of Miri Qalat was a rather remarkable one, as it provided crucial data in establishing a chrono-cultural sequence for the region of Kech-Makran.

Situated approximately 6 km north-west of the present-day city of Turbat, Balochistan, Miri Qalat is topped with an Islamic fortress and is located in the close proximity to the right bank of the Kech River, making it an important site of agricultural promise and civilization.

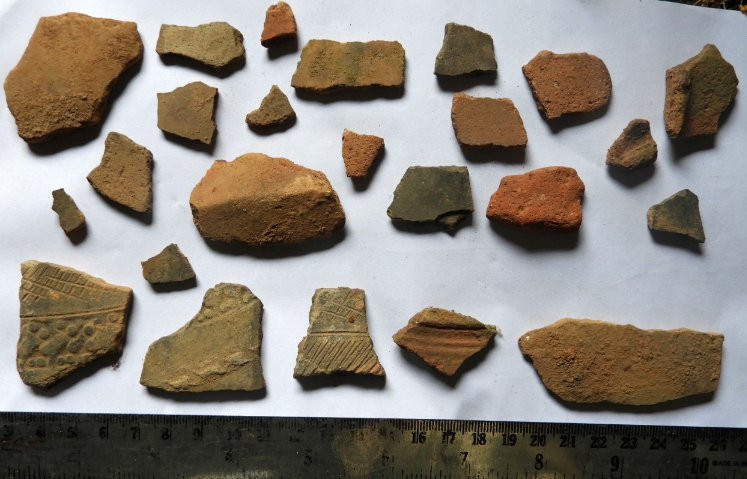
Example of Potsherds, these were found in Dharapalem Cave near Adavivaram.

Of the five field-campaigns conducted to excavate Miri Qalat, the oldest settlement found was dated to the 5th millennium BC. Findings from this settlement evidenced occupation from the Chalcolithic Period, the Early Bronze Age, and the Indus Valley Civilization. However, there was a gap in occupation during the 2nd millennium BC. after which the site was reoccupied from the first centuries BC to AD, continuing into the late Islamic period.

Some of the noticeable findings from the excavations include:

- Architectural remains from Trench IV.
- Chalcolithic period (Period IIa) grave from Trench IX.
- Funerary material such as pottery and stone vessel dating to the end of 4th millennium or beginning of 3rd millennium BC (period IIIa).
- Indus Civilization artifacts, including ivory comb, steatite stamp seal, and painted pottery dating to 2500-2300 BC (Period IV).

Based on the dating of these artifacts, Miri Qalat was found to have played a major role in the Indus Valley Civilization. Excavations in Trench I revealed that it was one of the westernmost sites of the civilization and played an important role in regional exchanges and trade. As was in close proximity to Sutkagen-dor and Sotka-Koh, two major maritime trading posts in coastal Kech-Makran, the site was a major stakeholder in maritime trade exchanges with the region and the Oman Peninsula.

Furthermore, archaeo-botanical and archaeo-zoological analysis of the coast bordering Miri Qalat provided important data on the ancient environment and food economy of Kech-Makran as a whole. Dating and contextualization were aided by resources such as ethnographic observations of fishery activities from the region. Archaeologists, including Cecile Buquet, Jean Desse, Nathalie Desse-Berset, Aurore Didier, Vincent Marcon, Benjamin Mutin, and Margareta Tengberg, conducted a paleo-geographical reconstruction of the ancient terrain, land, rivers, and coastline to better understand past resource use.

One of the main structural features discovered at the archaeological site of Miri Qalat was the presence of an irrigation system known as karez in Balochi. This system consists of an array of underground galleries that gather and store water from the ground at the foot of the lower lying mountains surrounding the valley. The presence of this rather complicated and advanced irrigation system is evidence of advanced human civilization and functionality as this was likely used to tend to agricultural practices in the area.

Connections with the Uruk civilization have been discovered, such as the presence of the typical Beveled rim bowls.

== Significance of excavation ==
Analysing archaeological sites and excavations in South Asia is notable because it remains largely neglected. In Pakistan, infrastructure remains notably poor, even in urban areas. Thus, this and other developing nations often lack the resources to excavate and preserve archaeological sites such as Miri Qalat. However, excavating and preserving such sites can offer both cultural and historical insights about the region, and enrich the understanding of South Asian civilization.

Excavation of the site of Miri Qalat has the potential to provide immense insight into human evolution and civilization. As it is one of the oldest accounts of urban civilization in South Asia, with its ties to the Indus Valley Civilization. Furthermore, this excavation has the potential to boost the nation's trade and economy, as the site predates even the pyramids of Egypt, representing some of the oldest and earliest human settlements in history.

== Legend ==
It is locally believed that the fort was built between 6000 and 8000 BC. It had been ruled over and possessed by uncountable kings from ancient times including Mughal, Macedonians, Arabs, Mongols, or Ghaznivids. According to other accounts it is called Miri-Kalat and is related to prince Punnhu a character in the love tale Sassui Punhun, narrated by many poets including Shah Abdul Latif Bhitai of Sindh. Punnhu was the son of Jam Aari or Aali and his forefathers were rulers of this area during the 12th century.

== Sources ==
- Baloch, Abdul Hameed, et al. "Historical Study of Makran: From the view point of the Modern Archeologists." Journal of Development and Social Sciences, vol. 3, no. 3, summer 2022.
- Bauer, E. L., & Østmo, M. A. (4 December 2017). 5 excavations and surveys 1985-2012. De Gruyter.
- Didier, Aurore, et al. "Explorations in Kech-Makran and Excavations at Miri Qalat." Lost and Found. Prehistoric Pottery Treasures from Baluchistan, 3 November 2020, pp. 297–333.
- Didier, Aurore, et al. "The Kech-Makran Region in Protohistoric Times." HAL Open Science. ost and Found, 28 October 2020.
- Government of Balochistan. (n.d.) Explore – The Official Web Gateway to Balochistan - Government of Balochistan.
- Government of Pakistan. (n.d.) Explainatory Notes. Government of Pakistan.
- Luqman, I. (4 February 2023). Meri Kalat: A cradle of civilization. Balochistan Point.
- Naseer, Shakir, and Zakirullah Jan. "Explorations and Excavations in Balochistan: An Overview of Archaeological Investigations in the Post-Independence Period." Pakistan Heritage, Research Journal of the Department of Archaeology Hazara University Mansehra-Pakistan, 2018.
- Tengberg, M. (1999). Crop husbandry at Miri Qalat, Makran, SW Pakistan (4000-2000 B.C.). Vegetation History and Archaeobotany, 8(1/2), 3–12.
- The President and Fellows of Harvard College. (2024). The site of Miri Qalat and the kech-makran (Balochistan, Pakistan) during the second half of the 3rd millennium BC. The Shelby White and Leon Levy Program for Archaeological Publications.
- UNESCO World Heritage Convention, & Government of Pakistan, Directorate General of Archaeology. (12 April 2016). Karez System Cultural Landscape. UNESCO World Heritage Centre.
