= M-8 motorway (Pakistan) =

Motorway in Pakistan

M-8 motorway
- ایم ٨ موٹروے
- Ratodero-Gwadar Motorway
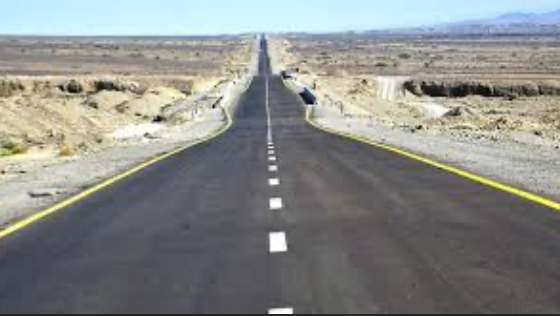
- M8 Motorway on the Gwadar to Hoshab section

Route information
- Maintained by National Highway Authority & Frontier Works Organisation
- Length: 892 km (554 mi)

Major junctions
- East end: Ratodero
- Hoshab Khuzdar
- West end: Gwadar

Location
- Country: Pakistan
- Major cities: Khuzdar Karkh Awaran; Hoshab; Turbat; Shahdadkot

Highway system
- Roads in Pakistan
← M-6	→ M-9

The M-8 (Urdu: موٹروے 8) or the Ratodero–Gwadar Motorway is an east–west motorway in Pakistan, connecting Sukkur- Larkana to Gwadar. The motorway is partly currently under-construction, while the 193 kilometre stretch between Gwadar and Hoshab was inaugurated in February 2016. A timeline for the completion of the motorway is not available due to the difficult terrain in which the motorway is being constructed.

== Route ==
The Ratodero Gwadar Motorway (M-8) will start from Ratodero in Sindh Province and enter Balochistan Province passing near the towns of Khuzdar, Awaran, Hoshab, Turbat before joining the Makran Coastal Highway just east of the port city of Gwadar. The M8 will cross the Dasht River and pass near the Mirani Dam in Balochistan Province. The M8 will have 4-lanes and a total length of 892 km. Initially, 2-lanes will be constructed after the completion of which another 2-lanes will be added, thus making a total of 4-lanes. It is the only operational motorway in Pakistan that is not equipped with M-Tag. The Hoshab-Gwadar section of the motorway is untolled, thus making it the only untolled part of a motorway in Pakistan.

== Construction ==
The M8 is being constructed by Pakistan's National Highway Authority. Construction of the M8 commenced on 15 October 2004. According to a newspaper report of 23 July 2015, the construction arm of Pakistan Army, Frontier Works Organisation (FWO) has completed 502 of 870 kilometres of this road. The work started simultaneously from the junction with the Makran Coastal Highway (MCH) and from Ratodero in Sindh. As of January 2015 the road is completed except for some bridges from MCH to a point near Hoshab where it joins N85 (Hoshab-Panjgur-Besima Highway) and Hoshab-Bela Road. The M8 Motorway will be following the alignment of N85. From the Ratodero end M8 to Khuzdar is completed and operational except for a difficult section going over the peaks of northern Kirthar range about 70 km east of Khuzdar.

== CPEC ==
M8 motorway is part of CPEC central route. Half of the motorway from Gwadar to Hoshab is operational with two lanes. The other two lanes will be added after M8 is fully operational. The motorway is operated by NHA & FWO. On 16 July 2020, ECNEC awarded Rs26bn for 146 km Hoshab-Awaran-Khuzdar Section.

== Junctions ==
M8 Motorway
Southbound exits	Junction	Northbound exits
Makran Coastal Highway (N–10)		Start of Motorway. Exit for Gwadar.
Turbat		Turbat
Hoshab		Hoshab
Awaran		Awaran
Khuzdar		Khuzdar, N85
Shahdadkot		Shahdadkot
Ratodero		Start of Motorway

== See also ==
- China-Pakistan Economic Corridor
- Motorways of Pakistan
- National Highways of Pakistan
- Transport in Pakistan
- National Highway Authority
