= Malik Abad =

Town in Balochistan, Pakistan

Coordinates: 26°00′N 63°03′E

Malik Abad is a village in Tehsil Tump, Kech District, Balochistan, Pakistan. The founder of the town was Malik Bahdhur, and the town was named after him.
