= Karakh =

Karakh may refer to:

- Karkh, a historical region in Baghdad
- Karakh Tehsil, a administrative area in Balochistan, Pakistan
- Karkh, Pakistan, a town in Pakistan
- Çaraq, a village in Azerbaijan

== See also ==
- Al-Karkh SC, an Iraqi football club
