= Hapdrok River =

River in Pakistan

Hapdrok River is a small river in Turbat, Balochistan, Pakistan. The name is Balochi in origin, with the meaning "seven ways of water".
