= Makran Medical College =

College in Balochistan, Pakistan

Mekran Medical College مکران طبی کالج
- Type: Public Government institute
- Established: 2017
- Founder: Dr Naimatullah Gichki
- Affiliations: Bolan University of Medical & Health Sciences; Pakistan Medical and Dental Council; College of Physicians and Surgeons Pakistan; Pakistan Nursing Council; Higher Education Commission (Pakistan)
- Principal: Dr. Afzal Khaliq Baloch
- Faculty: Anatomy, Bio-chemistry, physiology, pathology, pharmacology, Forensic Medicine and Toxicology, community medicines
- Students: 50 Students per year
- Undergraduates: Around 300
- Location: Turbat-92600, Balochistan, Pakistan; 34°12′17″N 73°14′00″E
- Campus: 200 acres (81 ha)

Mekran Medical College Turbat MMC Turbat
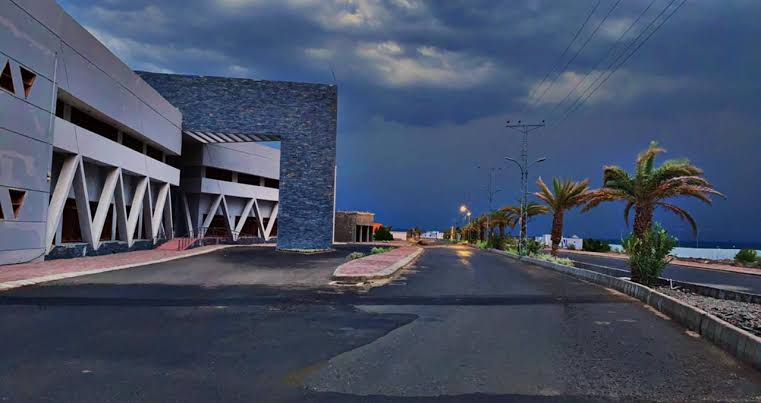

Geography
- Location: Mekran Medical College Turbat, Turbat(kech), Balochistan, Pakistan

Organisation
- Care system: Federal Ministry of Health; Balochistan Department of Health
- Type: Teaching
- Affiliated university: Bolan University of medical and health sciences Quetta

Services
- Standards: ISO 9001:2000; WHO

Links
- Lists: Hospitals in Pakistan

Mekran Medical College (MMC) (Urdu: مکران طبی کالج, romanized: Makarāna Tibbī College, Balochi: مکران طبی کالج) is a public medical institute located in Turbat, Balochistan, Pakistan.

Mekran Medical College (MMC) Turbat is a public sector medical college located in Turbat, a major city in the Makran region of Balochistan, Pakistan. The college is dedicated to providing medical education and training to students from Balochistan and other parts of the country.

It is one of several medical colleges affiliated to the Bolan University of Medical and Health Sciences Quetta and was recently recognized by the Pakistan Medical and Dental Council. MMC is home to 500 students in the MBBS program, with clinical rotations occurring at Teaching Hospital located a District Headquarters Hospital, Turbat city, Balochistan.

== History ==
In 2010, both the federal government and provincial government decided that more medical colleges were needed in the province to improve medical education, research and healthcare in Balochistan. Dr. Abdul Malik Baloch, former Chief Minister of Balochistan, led the way to construction of 3 medical colleges outside of the Quetta region in Turbat, Khuzdar and Loralai.

== Recognition ==
Makran Medical College is recognized by the Pakistan Medical and Dental Council (PMDC) which also goes by its new name Pakistan Medical Commission.

== Gallery ==
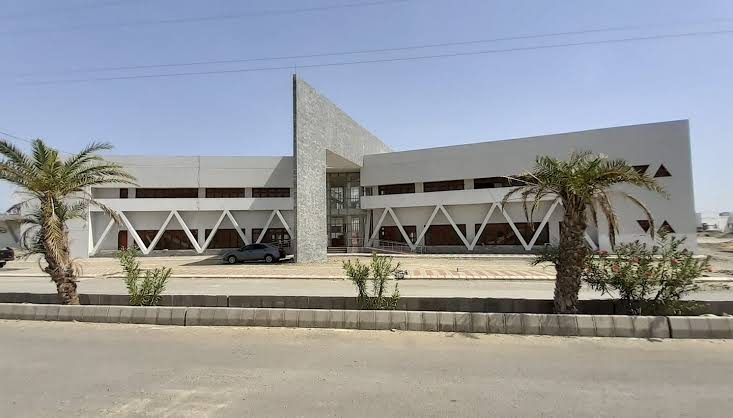
Mekran Medical College

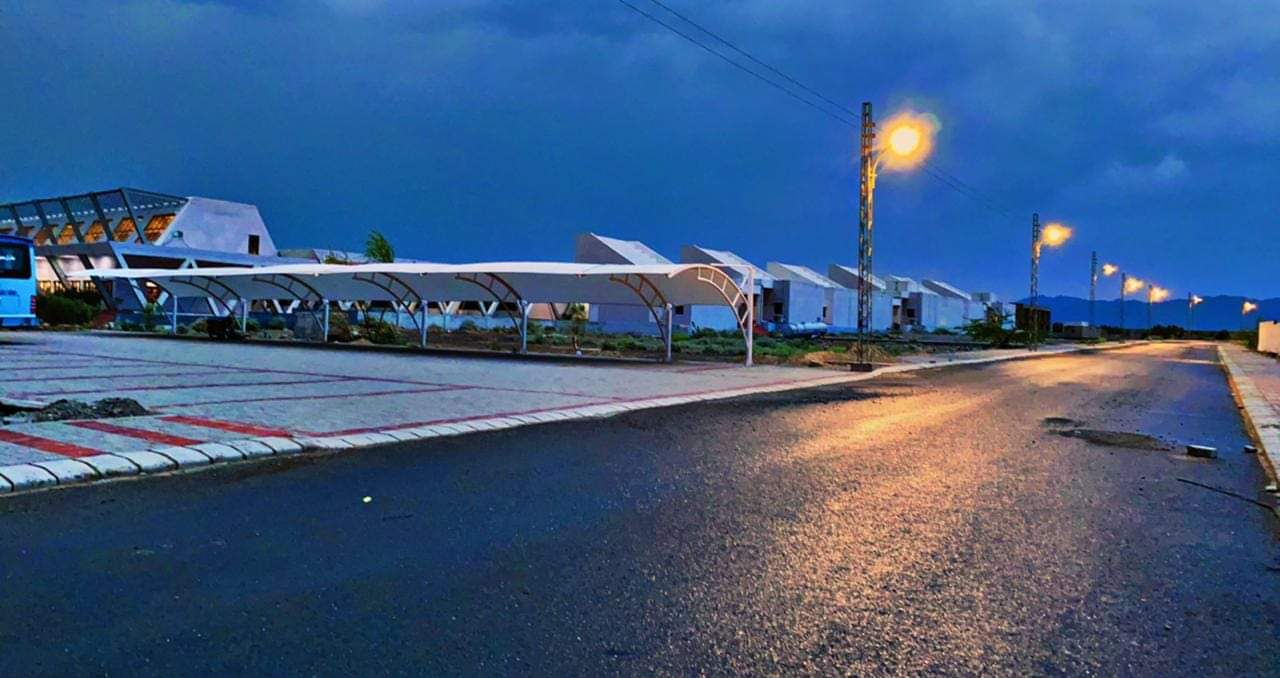
Mekran Medical College parking

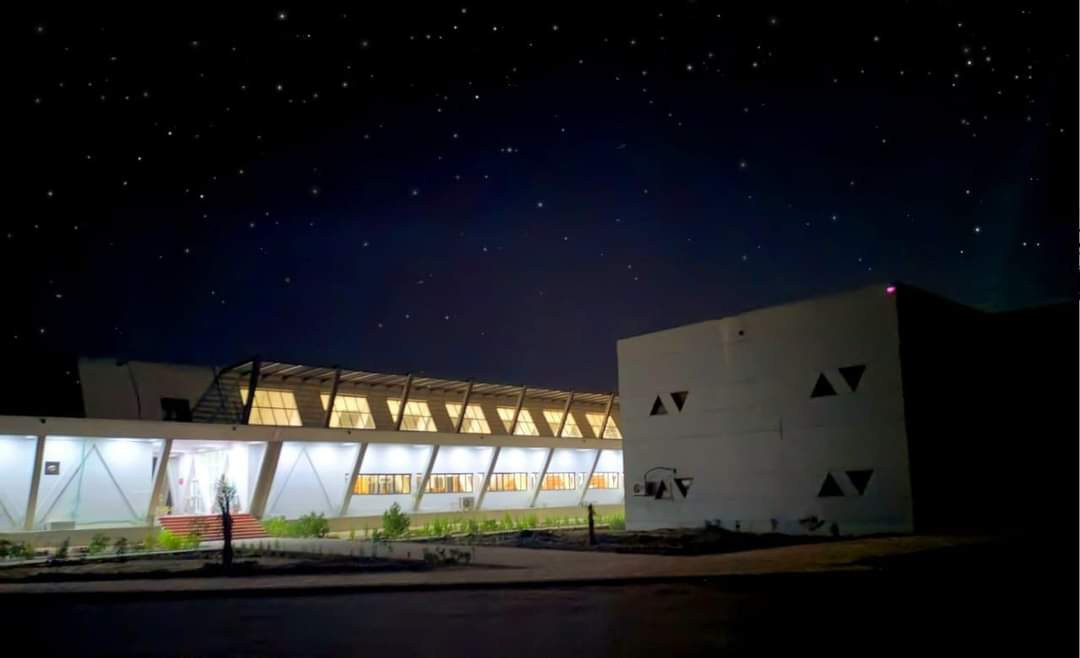
Mekran Medical College Library

== See also ==
- Bolan Medical College
