= Kuldan =

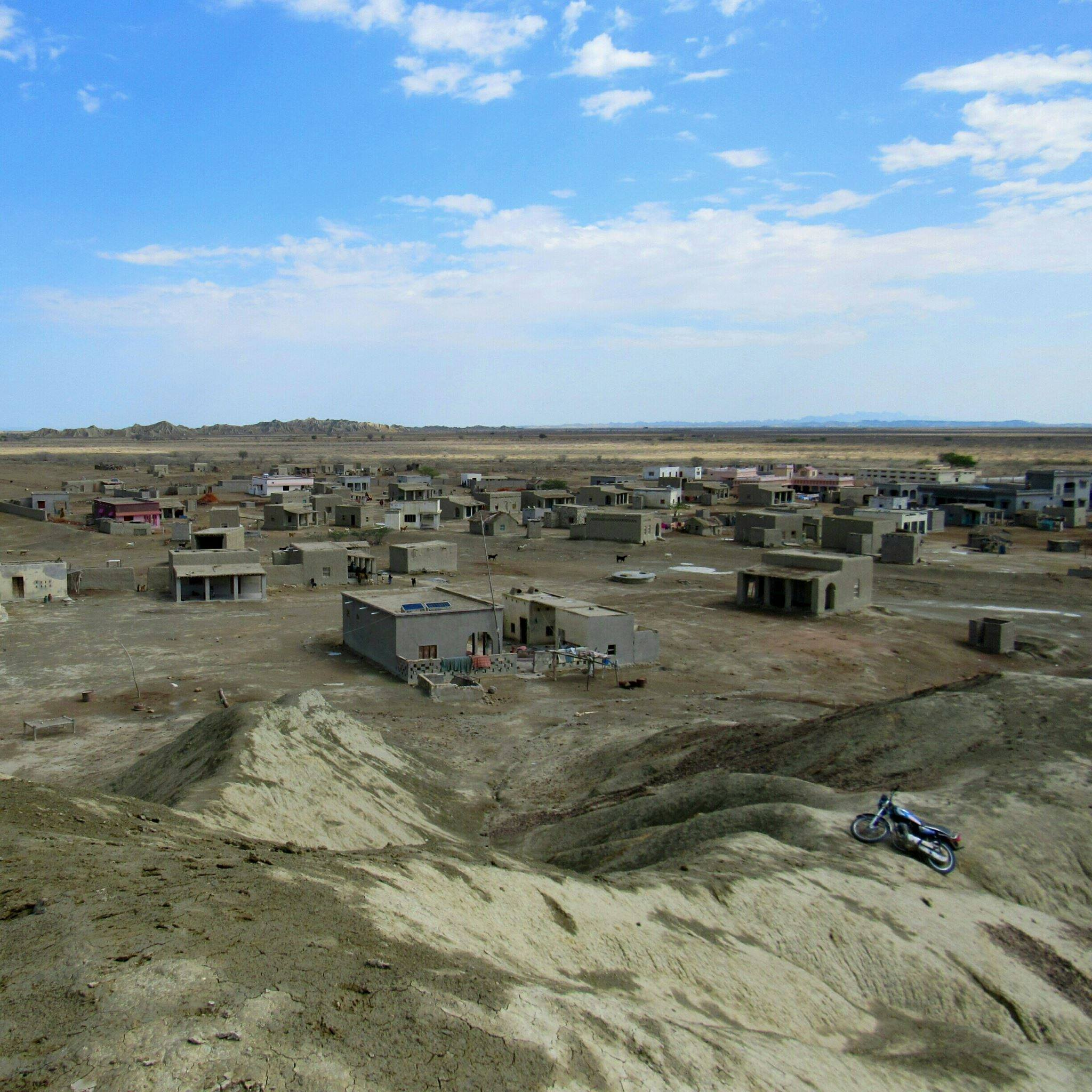
Kuldan Balochistan. 2016

Kuldan also known as Kuldān, is a village located in the Gwadar district of Balochistan, Pakistan.

Kuldan is located at 25° 20' 30" N, 61° 46' 30" E on the Makran Coastal Highway where it crosses the Dasht River Kuldan is a small village with a population of approximately 1000 people, and two mosques.

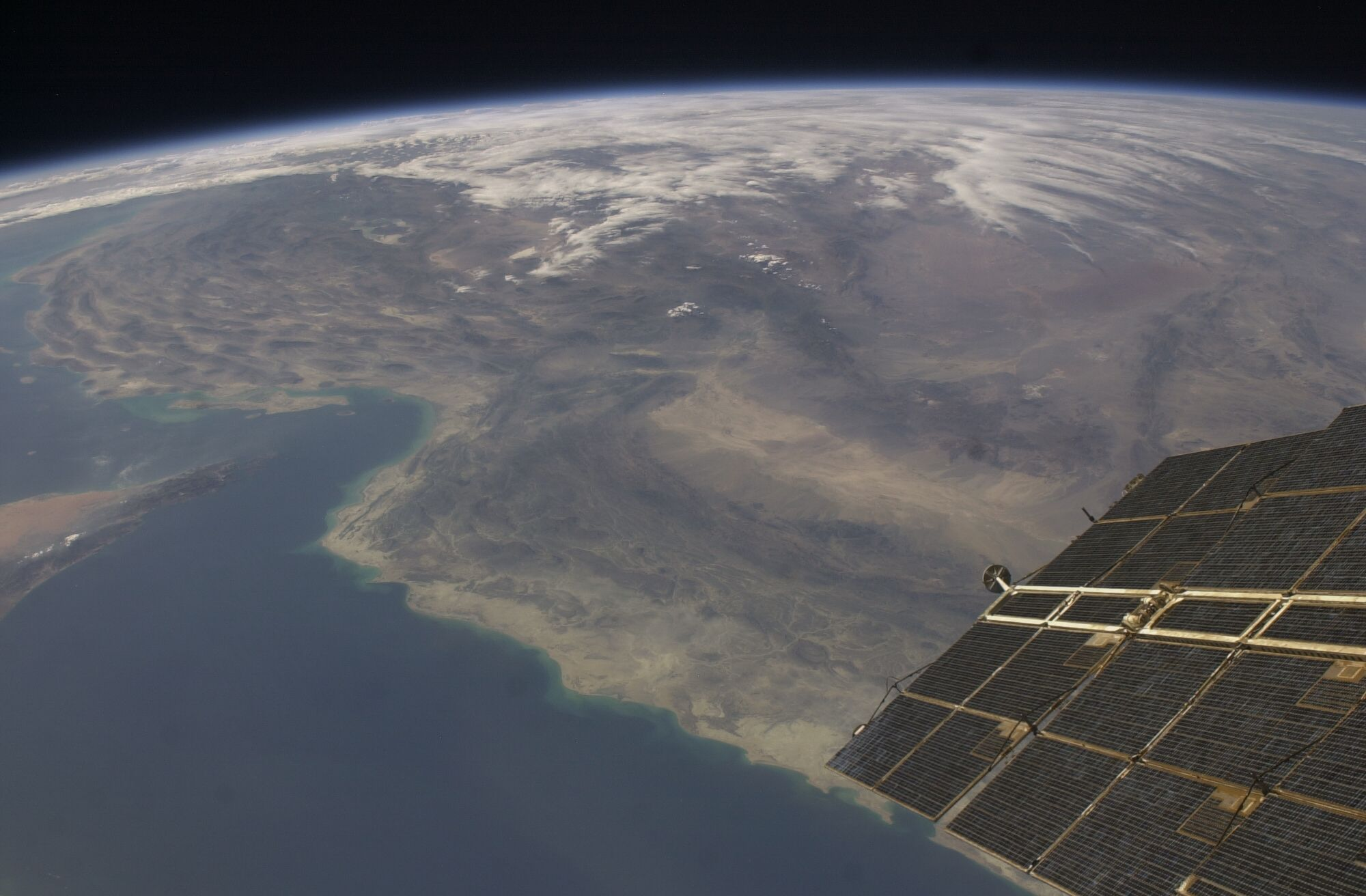
Kuldan and the rest of Southern Pakistan from space

The village is 15 kilometers east of the border with Iran and is the last Pakistani town before the crossing.
