= Mirani Dam =

Dam in Balochistan, Pakistan

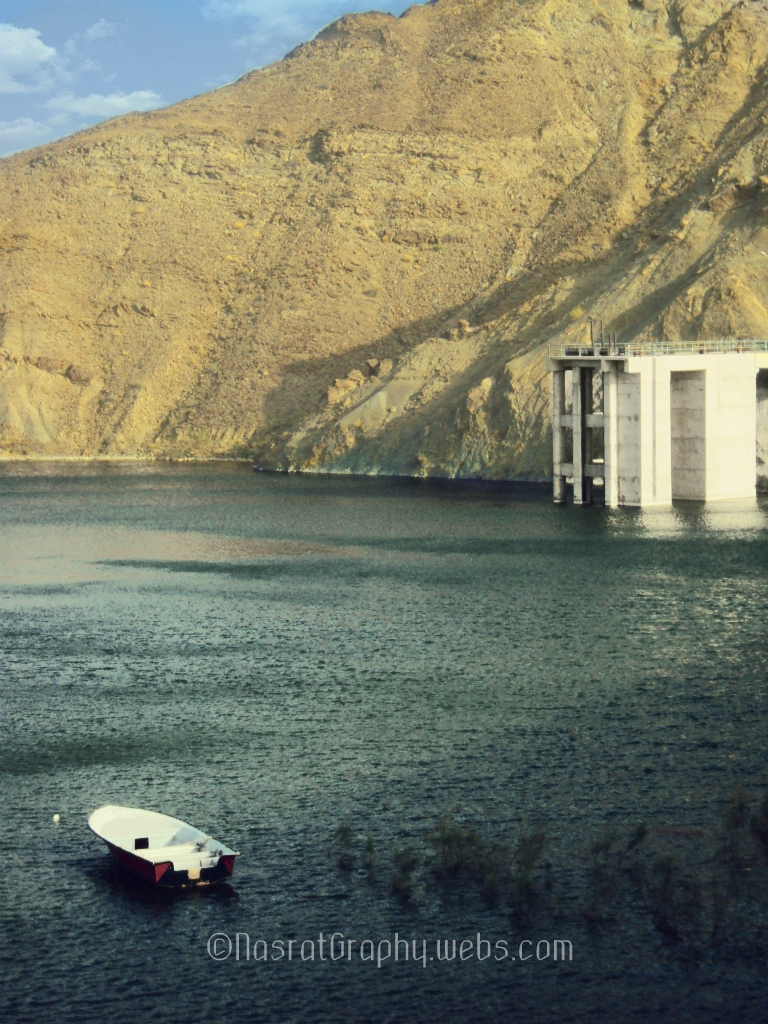
- Mirani Dam

- Location of Mirani Dam in Balochistan, Pakistan Mirani Dam (Pakistan)
- Official name: میرانی ڈیم
- Country: Pakistan
- Location: Kech District, Balochistan
- Coordinates: 25°56′28″N 62°41′36″E
- Status: In use
- Construction began: 8 July 2002
- Opening date: October 2006
- Owner: Government of Pakistan
- Operator: WAPDA

Dam and spillways
- Type of dam: Concrete-faced rock-filled
- Impounds: Dasht River
- Height: 127 ft (39 m)
- Length: 3,350 ft (1,020 m)
- Width (base): 35 ft (11 m)

Reservoir
- Creates: Mirani Reservoir
- Total capacity: (302,000 acre⋅ft (373,000,000 m^{3})
- Inactive capacity: (150,000 acre⋅ft (190,000,000 m^{3})
- Catchment area: 134 Sq.kilometre Power generation capacity=117 MW
- Normal elevation: 244 feet (74 metres) Above Mean Sea Level

Mirani Dam (Urdu: بند میرانی) is on the Dasht River, south of the Central Makran Range in Kech District in Balochistan province of Pakistan. The dam's 373,000,000 cubic metres (302,000 acre⋅ft) reservoir is fed by the Kech and the Nihing rivers, which join at Mirani Dam to form the Dasht River. Mirani Dam was completed in July 2006 and began impounding the Dasht River in August 2006.

== History and construction ==
The feasibility report of the Mirani dam project was first completed in 1956. However, practical steps towards constructing the dam were not taken until 45 years later in the wake of Gwadar Port development. Mirani Dam was commissioned by Pakistan's Water and Power Development Authority (WAPDA) in 2001 to provide water for Gwadar city. The ceremonial ground breaking was performed by then President of Pakistan, General Pervez Musharraf, in August 2001. The project was done on EPC basis by Descon Engineering Limited.

Commencement of work began in June 2002 and the project was completed in June 2007. Impounding of reservoir started in July 2006 and was inaugurated by then President of Pakistan Gen. Pervez Musharraf on 16 November 2006.

Construction of t-hours and, at its peak, 1,550 people were employed for its construction, mostly from Kech and Gwadar districts. 19,038 acres (7,704 ha) of land was acquired for the project.

During Cyclone Yemyin in June 2007, backflowing water from Mirani Dam in the Nihing and Kech rivers resulted in a large-scale disaster, affected several thousand households in the upstream areas of Nasirabad, Kallatuk, and Nodiz.

== Geography and hydrology ==
Mirani Dam is located on Dasht River, approximately 30 miles (48 km) west of Turbat and 380 miles (610 km) south west of Quetta, in Makran Division of Balochistan. The Central Makran Range are located to the north of the dam site. The dam is located 7 kilometres (4.3 miles) downstream of the confluence of the two tributaries of Dasht; Kech River and Nihing River at Kaur-e-Awaran. Both Kech and Nihing are seasonal streams which flow during summer from rainfall.

== Structure and purpose ==
Kech Valley consists of cultivable soil upon which agriculture activity could be carried out if a constant water supply is ensured. The primary purpose of Mirani Dam was to store water from the three rivers during the summer season and during floods so that water could be available for irrigation purposes throughout the year in order to bring 33,200 acres (13,400 ha) of hitherto uncultivated land in Kech Valley under cultivation. The secondary purpose of Mirani Dam is to ensure a constant supply of clean drinking water to the towns of Turbat and Gwadar throughout the year.

Reservoir:

- Gross Storage: 302,000 acre⋅ft (373,000,000 m^{3}).
- Live Storage: 52,000 acre⋅ft (64,000,000 m^{3}).
- Average Annual Releases: 114,000 acre⋅ft (141,000,000 m^{3}).

Dam:

- Type: Concrete-faced rock-filled
- Height: 127 ft (39 m)
- Length at Crest: 3,350 ft (1,020 m)
- Top Width: 35 ft (11 m)

Spillway:

- Type: Overflow
- Clear Waterway: 344 ft (105 m)
- Designed Capacity: 205,800 cu ft/s (5,830 m^{3}/s)
- Maximum Capacity: 384,300 cu ft/s (10,880 m^{3}/s)

Outlet:

- Tunnel Diameter: 8 ft (2.4 m)
- Capacity: 377 cu ft/s (10.7 m^{3}/s)

Irrigation System Command Area & Capacity:

- Irrigation System: Gravity, Lined Channels
- Right Bank Canal: 20,800 acres (84 km^{2}) & 36 cu ft/s (1.0 m^{3}/s)
- Left Bank Canal: 12,400 acres (50 km^{2}) & 141 cu ft/s (4.0 m^{3}/s)
- Total: 33,200 acres (134 km^{2}) & 377 cu ft/s (10.7 m^{3}/s)

== Gallery ==
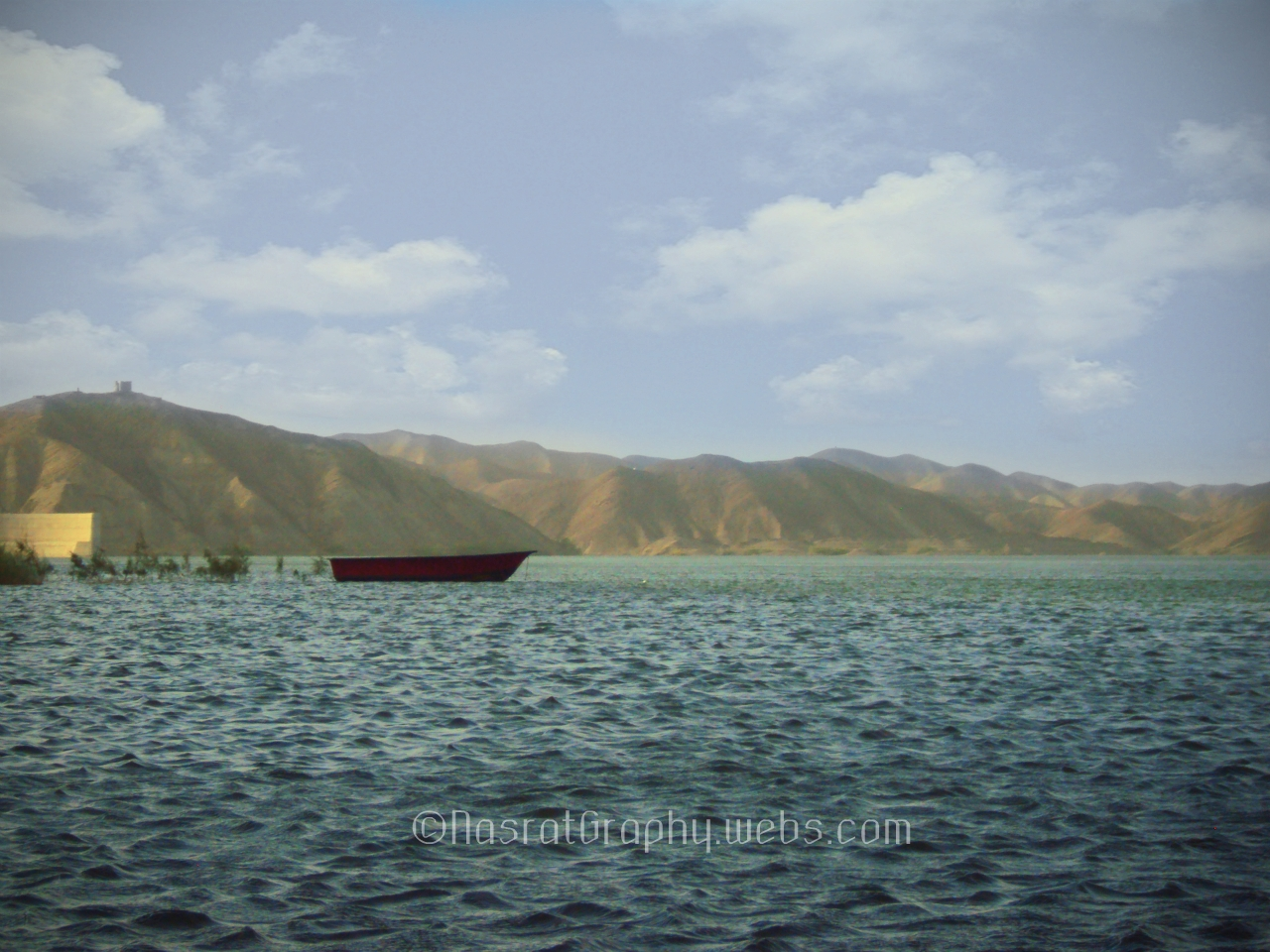
Meerani Dam

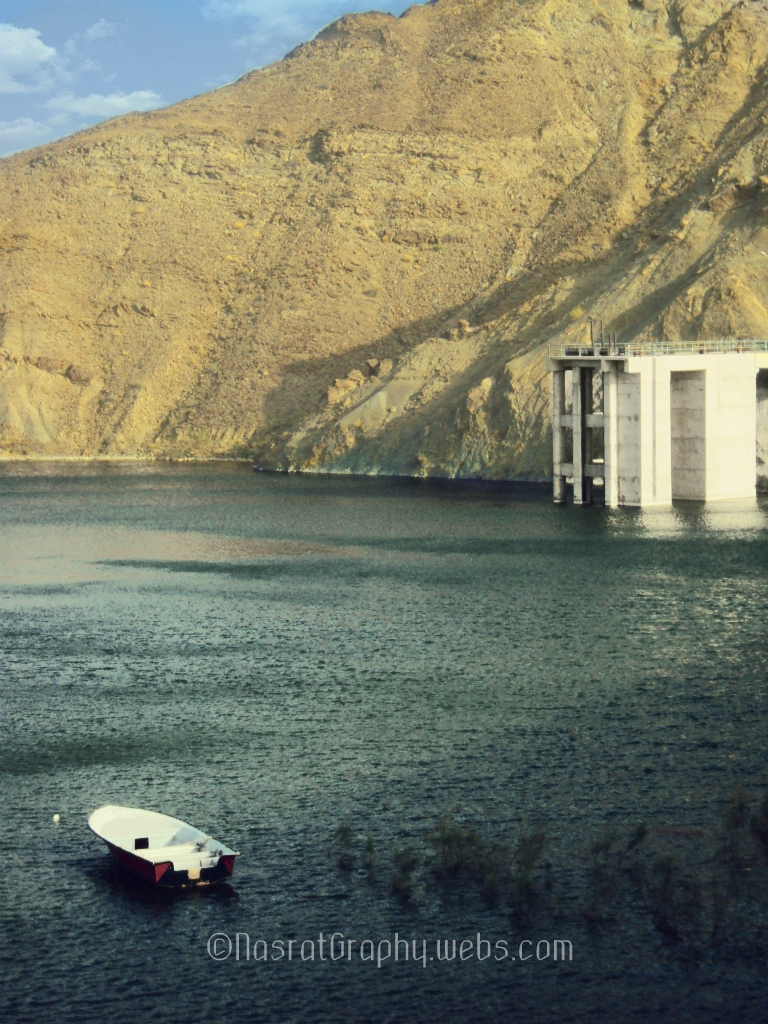
Meerani Dam

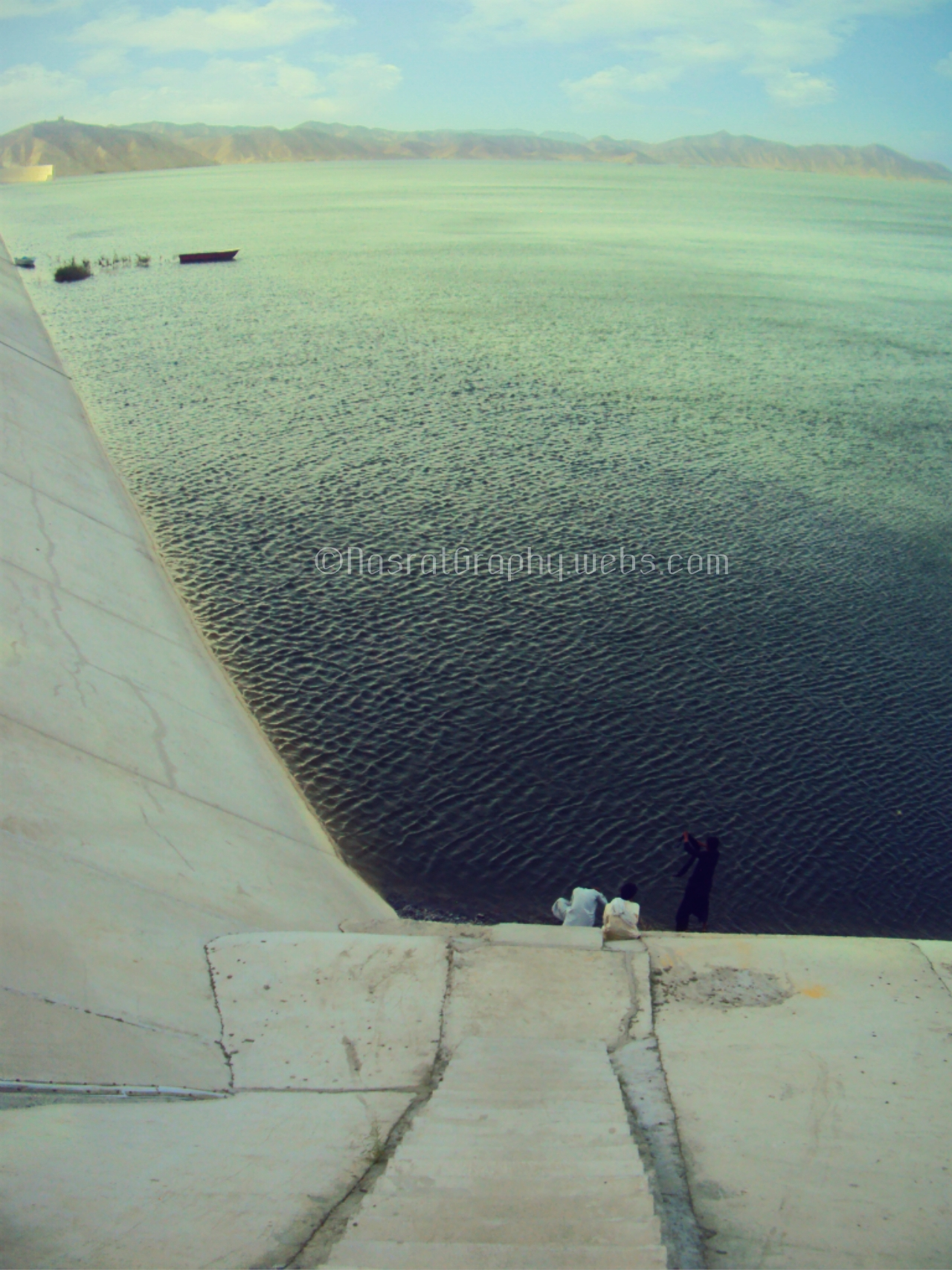
Meerani Dam

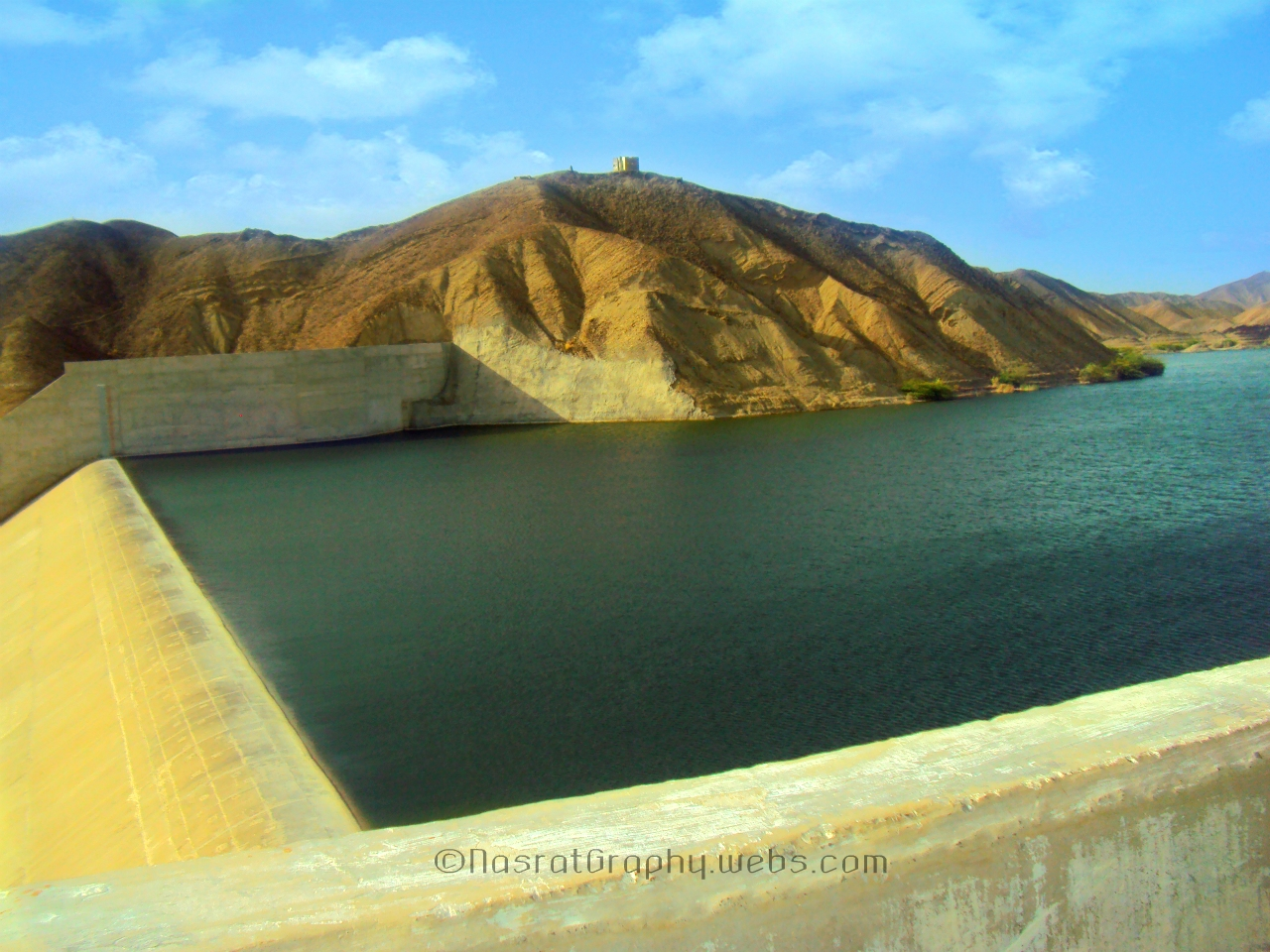
Meerani Dam

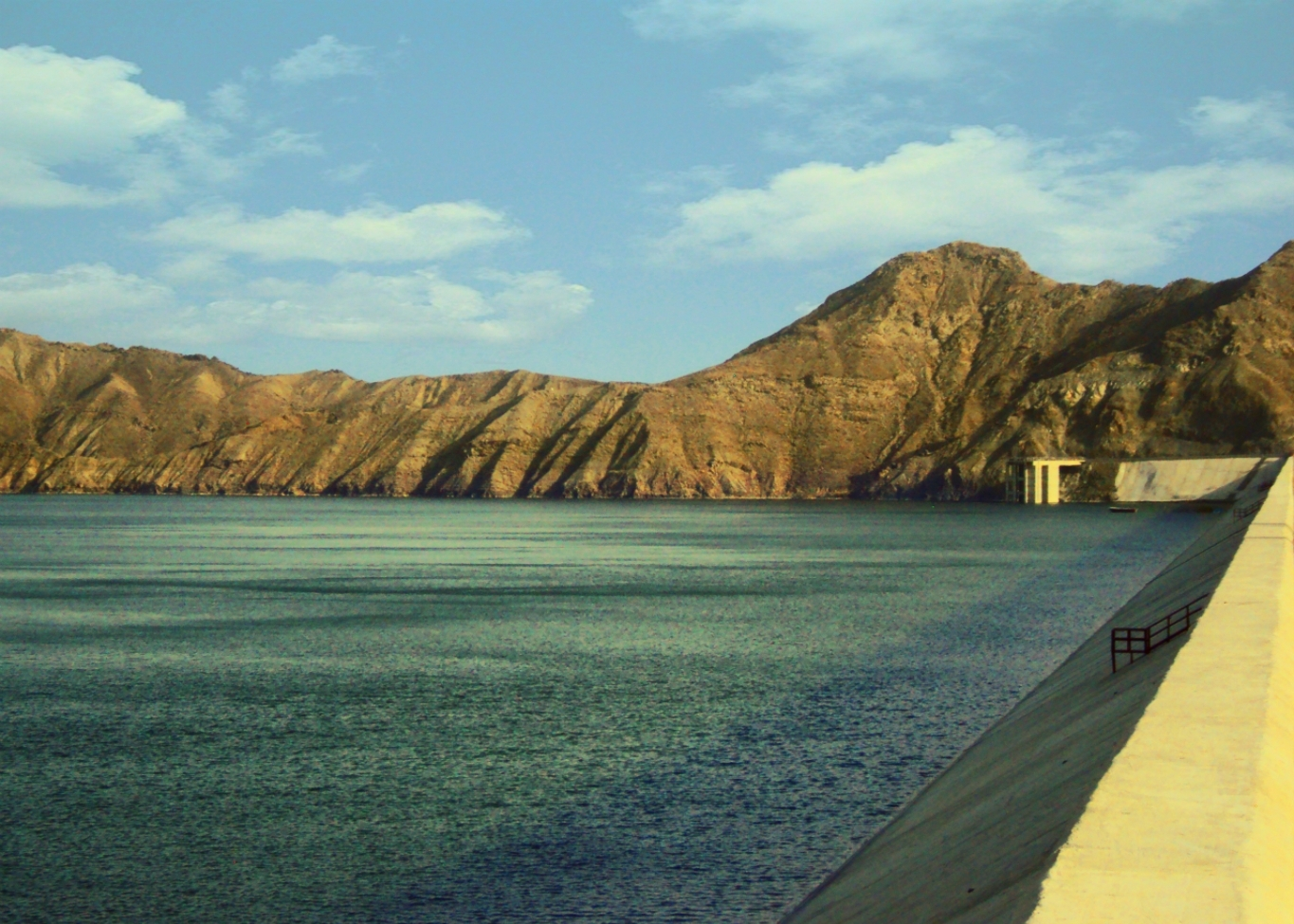
MeeraniDam

== Issues ==
While the dam is supposed to irrigate up to 33,200 acres (134 km^{2}) of land according to official plans, only a fraction of this land is irrigated and developed. The local communities have staged protests, hunger-strikes, and people's tribunal to demand compensation in lieu of damages from the government authorities.

== Mirani Dam Flooding ==
On the night between June 26 & 27, 2007 the backflow water from Mirani dam inundated upstream areas of Nasirabad, Nodez, and Kallatuk destroying several thousand houses, date trees, and indigenous underground irrigation channels. The damage was so extensive that the current Chief Minister of Baluchistan province, Dr. Abdul Malik Baloch who was a Senator at the time, termed the Dam as a "mega-disaster" and calling into question all the government assessments and forecasts about its utility. Local activists have been since then demanding the relevant authorities including WAPDA, the Planning Commission of Pakistan, and the Provincial government to pay compensation for their losses. Their specific demands include compensation of damages to houses and date trees for up to 271.2 Average Mean Sea Level (AMSL),. While the government has acknowledged the claim by local communities 8 years after the disaster, the compensation is yet to be paid.

== See also ==
- List of dams and reservoirs in Pakistan
