= Turbat =

City in Balochistan, Pakistan

Turbat تربت
- City
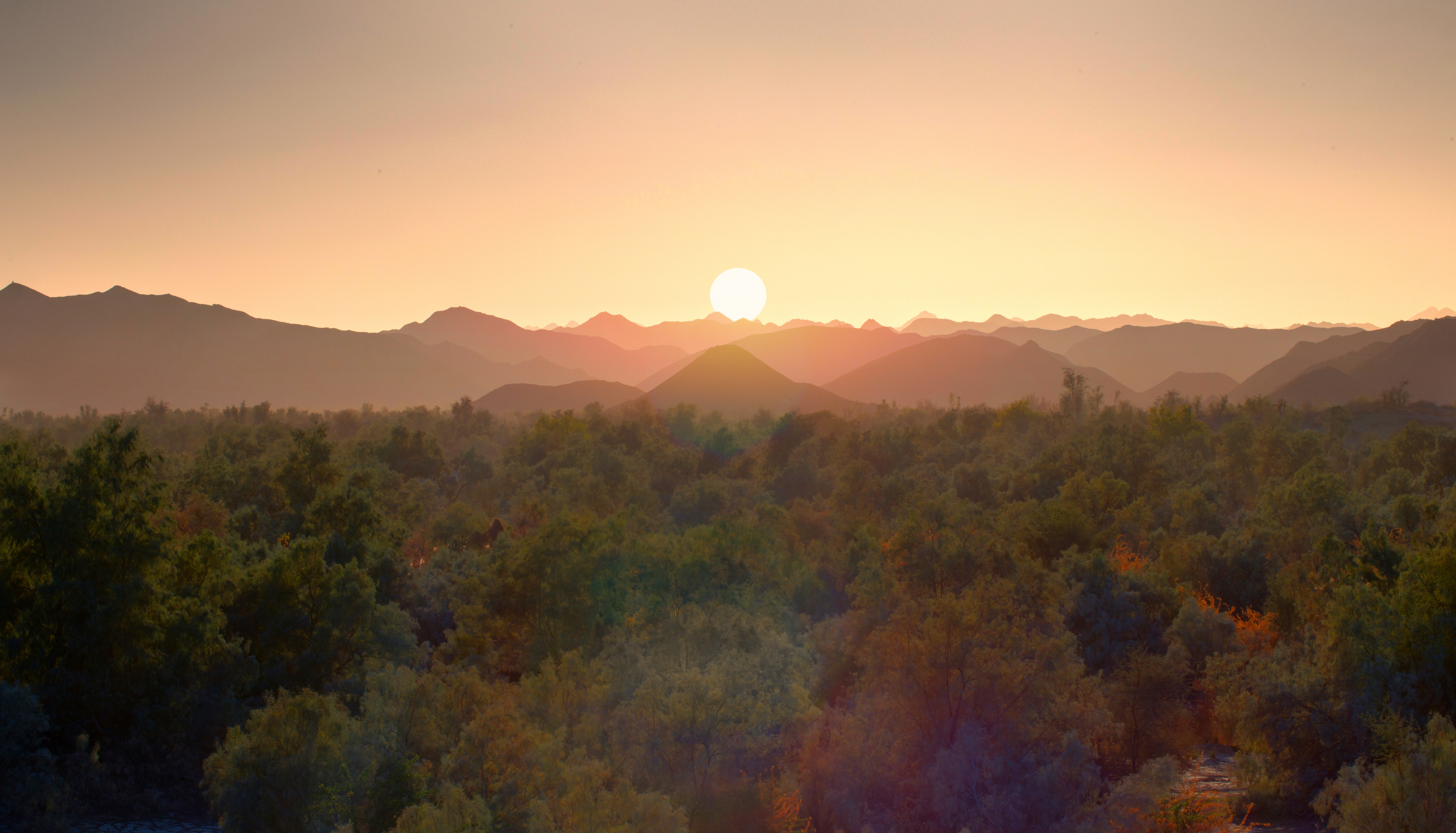
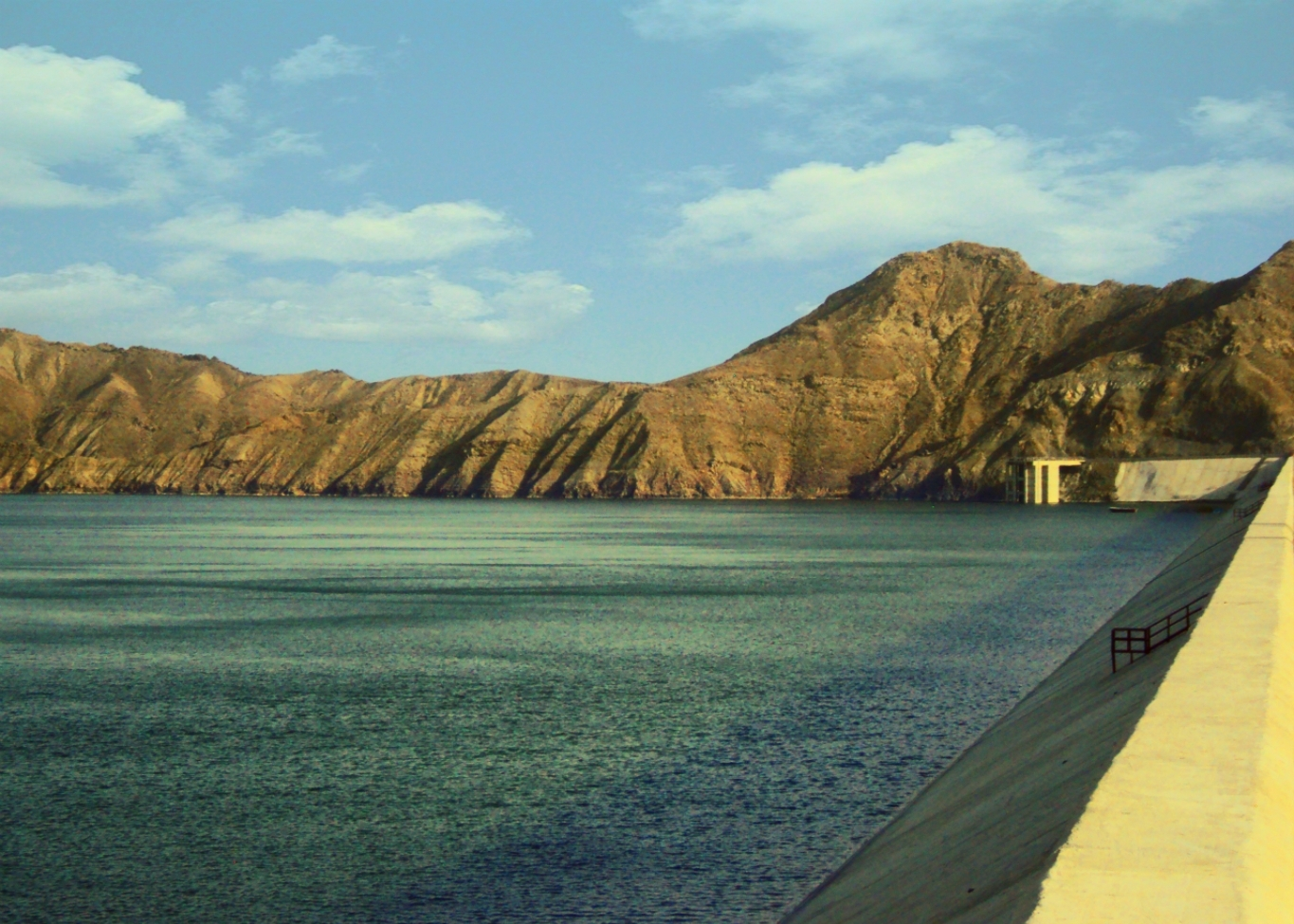
- From top: A sunset in the mountains of Turbat, Mirani Dam

- Location within Balochistan, Pakistan Location within Pakistan
- Coordinates: 26°0′15″N 63°3′38″E
- Country: Pakistan
- Province: Balochistan
- District: Kech District
- Tehsil: Turbat Tehsil

Government
  - Type: Municipal Corporation
  - Mayor: Balach Sher Qazi
  - Deputy Mayor: Vacant

Area
  - City: 420 km^{2} (160 sq mi)
- Elevation: 129 m (423 ft)

Population (2023)
  - City: 268,625
  - Rank: 35th in Pakistan; 2nd in Balochistan
  - Density: 640/km^{2} (1,700/sq mi)
- Time zone: UTC+5 (PST)
- Number of Union councils: 1

Turbat (Urdu and Balochi: تربت) is a city in the southern region of the Balochistan province of Pakistan. It is the administrative centre of Kech District. Turbat is the second-largest city in Balochistan after Quetta and the 35th largest city in the country by population. Situated on the left bank of the Kech River, Turbat was the historical capital of the princely state of Makran in British India. It is the largest city in the southern part of the province. The Gwadar Port lies 180 kilometres (110 mi) southwest of Turbat.

== History ==
In the 12th century, Turbat and its surrounding areas, along with Iranian Makran, were ruled by Prince Punnu (Mir Dosthein) and his father and his uncle Prince Aali Khan and Prince Khosag Khan. Later, Turbat was ruled by the Gichki tribes of Makran and the Buledi tribe about 400 years ago. It was then the headquarters of the Makran State and the Nawab of Makran resided in Shahi Tump near Turbat. When Makran State was dissolved, Turbat city remained the Division Headquarters. Turbat means "place or land of lovers".

== Overview ==
The town is located in the southern portion of the Balochistan province, just on the left bank of the Kech River, a tributary to the Dasht River. To its north and east, it is surrounded by the Makran Range which descends to the coastal plains in the south. The town is known for its dates production grown in its neighborhoods and has a date-processing factory. The area also produces jowar, barley, wheat, and rice.

The town has a special place in Baloch folklore and literature as it is the home of Punnu, the hero of the romance of Sassi Punnun. The remains of Punnu's fort can still be seen in Turbat.

The city is one of the most significant cities of Balochistan as the important Gwadar port is 180 km away from the town. Gwadar is linked by the highway recently developed and improved under the CPEC project. Turbat has an international airport that has many flights to the Gulf states of Oman, the UAE and Qatar. Although the city is not coastal but still has a newly built Pakistan Navy base camp which is being expanded to become a major air base in the future supporting Karachi. Turbat on its extreme south links with another coastal city of Pasni that comes administratively under district Gwadar.

The city hosts educational institutes including University of Turbat, Makran Medical College and Balochistan University of Engineering & Technology, Turbat Campus.

== Demographics ==
Population

Historical population

Year	Pop.	±% p.a.
1951	3,549	—
1961	4,578	+2.58%
1972	27,671	+17.77%
1981	52,337	+7.34%

Year	Pop.	±% p.a.
1998	68,603	+1.60%
2017	213,557	+6.16%
2023	268,625	+3.90%

According to the 2023 census, Turbat had a population of 268,625.

Languages

Languages of Turbat (2023 Census)
1. Balochi (98.8%)
2. Urdu (0.41%)
3. Kashmiri (0.08%)
4. Others (0.71%)

== Climate ==
Turbat is one of the hottest cities in South Asia, and is counted as the world's fourth hottest place, having recorded temperatures as high as 53.5 degrees Celsius. On May 28, 2017, temperatures hit 128.7 degrees Fahrenheit (53.7 Celsius, plus or minus 0.4 degrees uncertainty), placing it among the four hottest temperatures recorded on earth, according to the WMO.

== Transport ==
Turbat has an international airport which offers direct flights to Gwadar, Karachi, and Sharjah, UAE. The road network links Turbat with Kalat and Quetta to the northeast, Gwadar and Pasni to the south, Chabahar and Iranshahr to the west, and Karachi to the east.

As part of the China-Pakistan Economic Corridor (CPEC) the M-8 motorway is under construction but so far now links Turbat to Gwadar, a major port city, and Hoshab. In the future Turbat will be linked to northern Sindh by highway, which will allow economic development in the region by increased connectivity with the national transportation system. In November 2023, the Pakistan Civil Aviation Authority (CAA) upgraded the Turbat International Airport into a hub airport authorized to allow Airbus A320 and Boeing 737 transport. Before the upgrade, only small aircraft and the ATR 72 were allowed to land. This is a big step in the infrastructure of Turbat, as this will allow direct flights by carriers from Turbat to cities across Pakistan and around the world. International sources speculate that flight operation from carriers would begin shortly after this upgrade.

Since 2016, there is a VLF transmission facility of the Pakistani Navy near Turbat for sending messages to submerged submarines.

== See also ==
- Turbat International Airport
- Gwadar
- Gwadar International Airport
