= Dasht River =

River in southwestern Pakistani province of Baluchistan

Dasht River Dasht Kaur
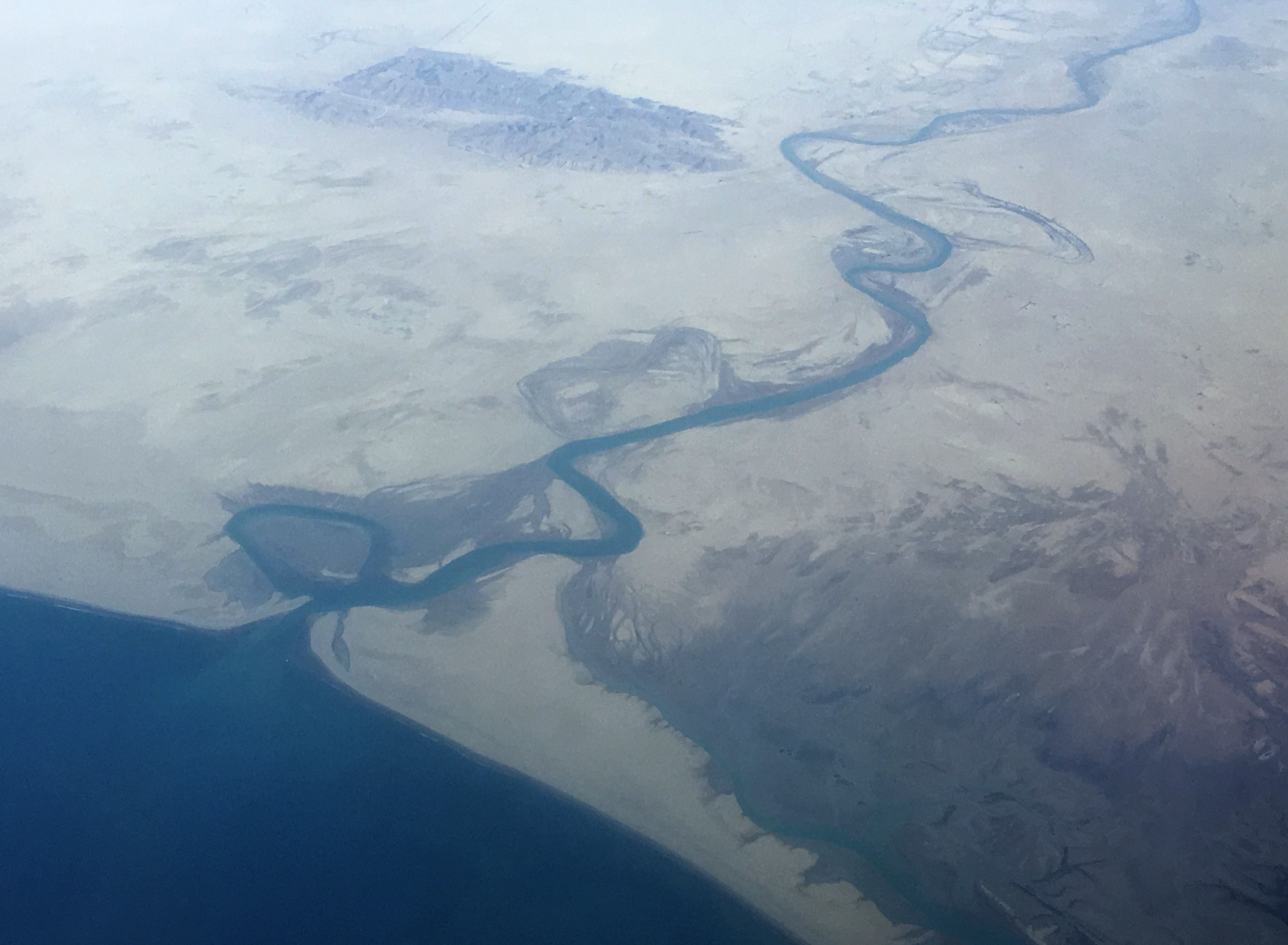
- Dasht river running into the Jiwani Bay near the border with Iran
- Native name: دریائے دشت (Urdu)

Location
- Countries: Pakistan
- Provinces: Balochistan
- Districts: Kech, Gwadar
- Settlements: Kuldan, Sutkagan Dor

Physical characteristics
- Source: Mirani Dam
- Mouth
  - location: Gwadar District, Balochistan, Pakistan
  - coordinates: 25°10′46″N 61°40′39″E
  - elevation: 0 m (0 ft)
- Length: 430 km (270 mi)
- Basin size: 31,058.3 km^{2} (11,991.7 sq mi)
- Discharge
  - location: Near mouth
  - average: (Period: 1971–2000)41.8 m^{3}/s (1,480 cu ft/s)

Basin features
- Progression: Arabian Sea
- River system: Dasht River
- Tributaries
  - left: Kech
  - right: Nihing
- Type: Intermittent river

The Dasht River (Urdu: دریائے دشت) is located in the Makran region and Gwadar District, in the southwestern section of Balochistan Province, Pakistan which drains near Jiwani.

== Tributaries ==
The Kech River which flows through Kech valley is the eastern tributary of the Dasht River while its western tributary the Nihing River flows east from the Iran–Pakistan border before joining the Kech River at Mirani Dam to form the Dasht River.

== Mirani Dam ==
The 373,000,000 m^{3} Mirani Dam is located across the Dasht River in the Central Makran Range. The dam was built to supply agricultural irrigation water for the surrounding areas, flood control in the downstream region, and to provide drinking water for the city of Gwadar.
