= Karkh, Pakistan =

Town in Balochistan, Pakistan

Karkh Brahui: کارخ
- City Pakistan
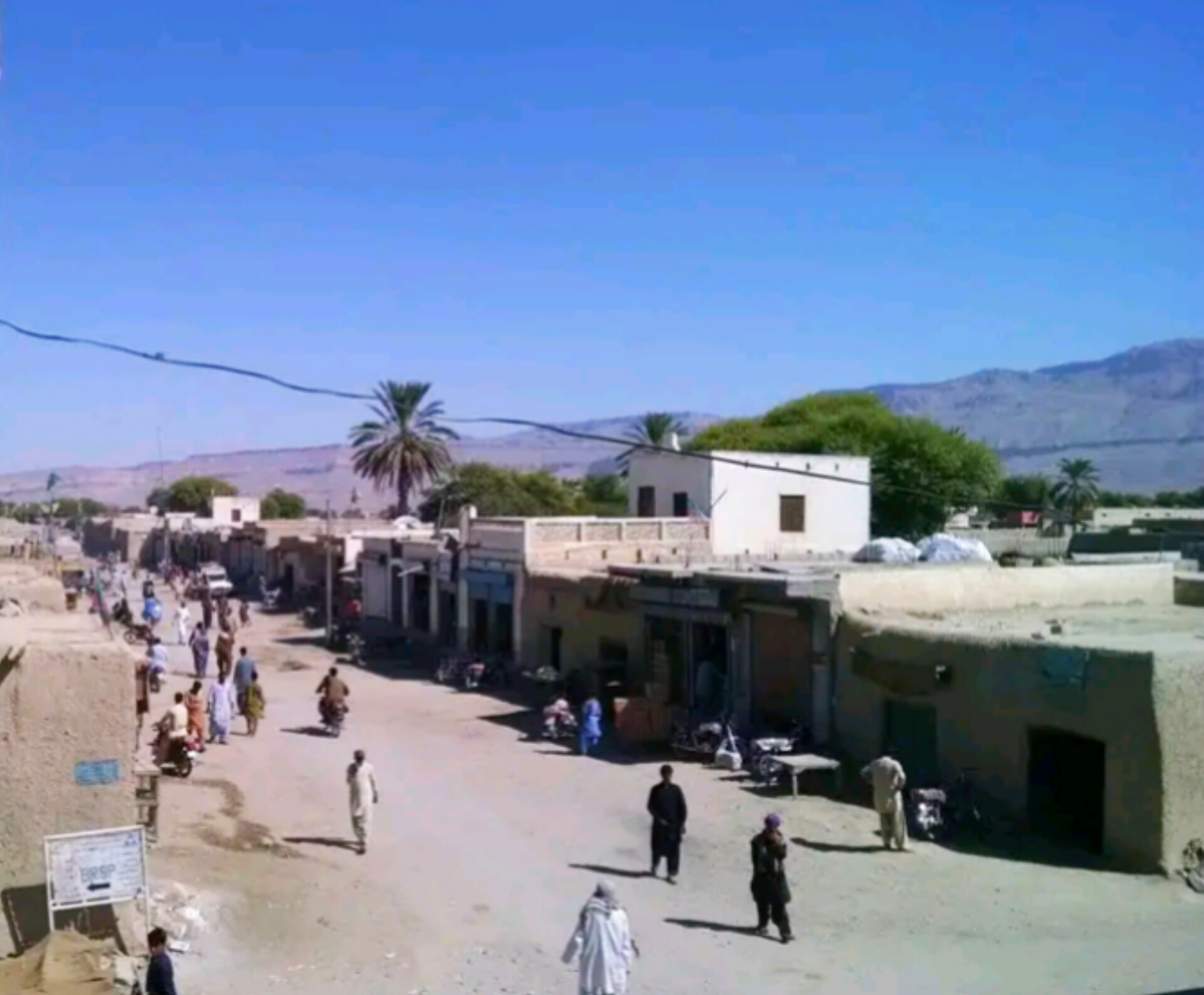
- Main road of Karkh

- Location in Pakistan Karkh (Pakistan)
- Coordinates: 27°44′25″N 67°10′30″E
- Country: Pakistan
- Province: Balochistan
- District: Khuzdar District
- Tehsil: Karakh
- Time zone: UTC+5 (PST)

Karkh is a remote area of Khuzdar District, Balochistan, Pakistan. It serves as the administrative headquarters of Karakh Tehsil and is situated approximately 80 kilometres of Khuzdar, lying just off the M-8 Motorway. It has a police station.
