= Kech (Turbat) Tehsil =

Turbat
- Tehsil
- Location within Balochistan, Pakistan Location within Pakistan Location within Asia Location within Earth
- Coordinates: 26°0′15″N 63°3′38″E
- Country: Pakistan
- Province: Balochistan
- District: Kech
- Headquarter: Turbat

Area
  - Tehsil: 9,742 km^{2} (3,761 sq mi)

Population (2023)
  - Tehsil: 470,605
  - Density: 48.31/km^{2} (125.1/sq mi)
  - Urban: 268,625 (57.08%)
  - Rural: 201,980 (42.92%)

Literacy (2023)
  - Literacy rate: 63.65%
- Time zone: UTC+5 (PST)
- Number of Union Councils: 17

Turbat Tehsil is an administrative subdivision (tehsil) of Kech District in the Balochistan province of Pakistan. The tehsil is administratively subdivided into seventeen Union Councils and is headquartered in the city of Turbat.

== Demographics ==
=== Population ===
Historical population
Year	Pop.	±% p.a.
1951	...	—
1961	41,900	—
1972	91,982	+7.41%
1981	147,920	+5.42%
1998	157,142	+0.36%
2017	416,608	+5.27%
2023	470,605	+2.05%
Sources: Pakistan Bureau of Statistics:

According to 2023 census, Tehsils had a population of 470,605 living in 100,774 households, including 42,826 in rural and 57,948 in urban areas.

The overall literacy rate stands at 63.65%, with a marked urban-rural divide: 67.66% in urban areas compared to only 58.25% in rural areas of the tehsil. A significant gender gap is also evident, with male literacy at 70.14% and females literacy at just 56.82%. These figures highlight persistent challenges in educational access, particularly for women and girls.

== See also ==
- Tehsils in Pakistan
  - Tehsils of Balochistan
- Districts of Pakistan
  - Districts of Balochistan, Pakistan
- Divisions of Pakistan
  - Divisions of Balochistan
