= Kech River =

River in Pakistan

Coordinates: 25°59′N 62°44′E

The Kech River (Balochi: كݔچ كؤر) flows in the Makran region of southeastern Iran and the southwestern area of Balochistan Province in southwestern Pakistan.

== Geography ==
The seasonal intermittent river is a tributary of the Dasht River. The Dasht flows southeast into the Central Makran Range in the Gwadar District of Balochistan, and to its mouth at the Gulf of Oman of the Arabian Sea.

Uses

The city of Turbat is located on the Kech River. The river's water is used to irrigate orchards and for vegetable farming in surrounding areas.

== Fauna ==
According to WWF-Pakistan, the Kech is one of Balochistan's four coastal rivers, the others being the Hingol, Hub and Basol rivers, that support a healthy population of Pakistan's marsh crocodiles. The conservation organisation noted that the four rivers rely on rainwater, which leaves behind small and big ponds that serve as habitats for the crocodiles. It did however note that these ponds were drying up much quicker due to climate change-related warming temperatures and less rain.

=== Flooding ===
The area is prone to flooding by the Kech River. In June 2007 the flood waters entered the city of Turbat after the river burst it banks, and thousands were affected. The downstream Mirani Dam on the Dasht River was endangered.

== Archaeology ==
Kech-Makran culture flourished in the Kech River Valley in protohistoric times as early as the fifth millennium BC. There were numerous settlements in this area, including Kot Bala.

== See also ==
- Geography of Balochistan, Pakistan
- Makran
