= Kech District =

District in Balochistan, Pakistan

Coordinates: 26°00′N 63°00′E

Kech District ضلع کیچ کیچ دمگ Turbat District
- District
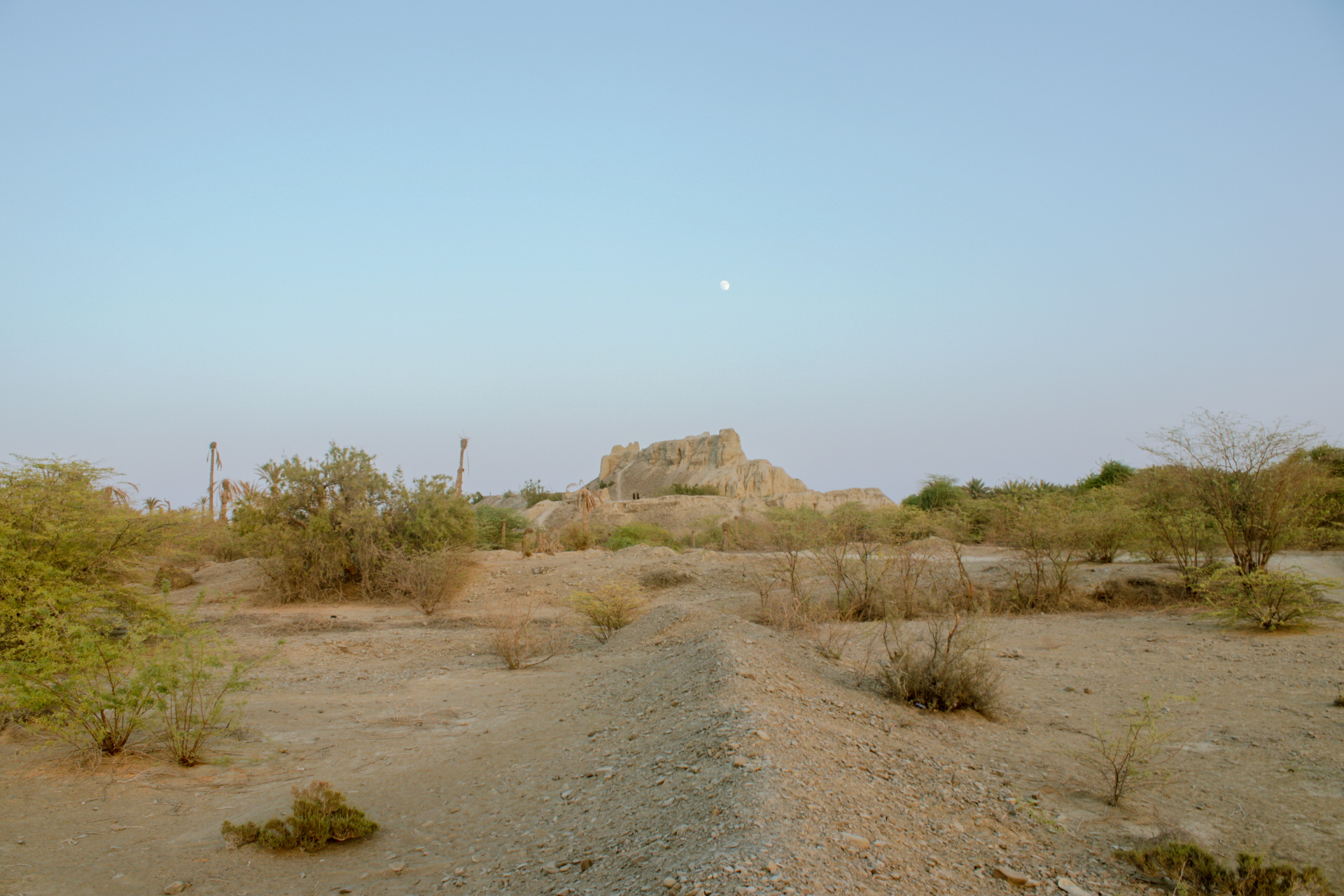
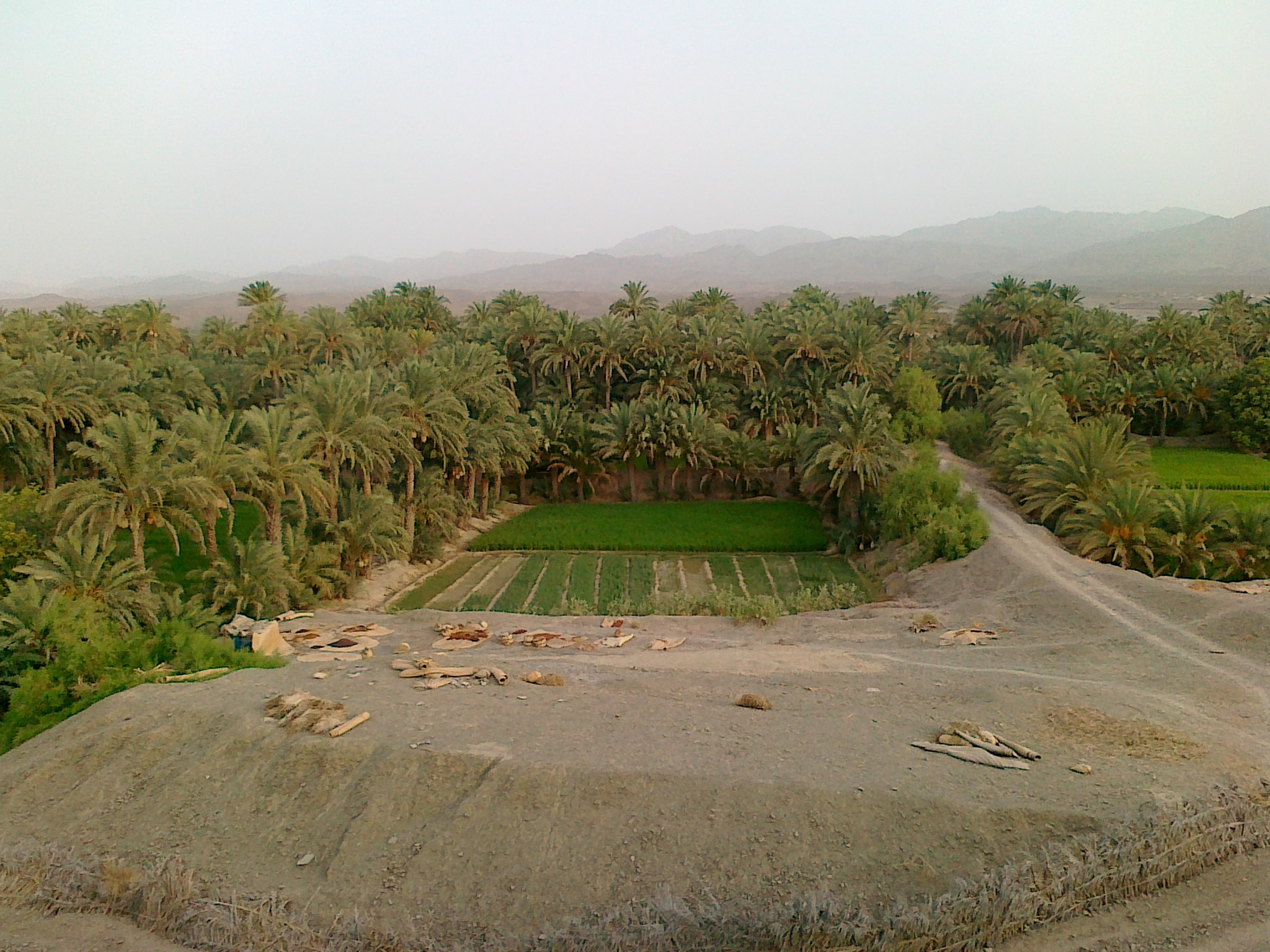
- Katak Fort; Bottom: Fields in Tejaban

- Map of Balochistan with Kech District highlighted in maroon
- Country: Pakistan
- Province: Balochistan
- Division: Makran
- Headquarter: Turbat

Government
  - Type: District Administration
  - Deputy Commissioner: N/A
  - District Police Officer: N/A
  - District Health Officer: N/A

Area
  - Total: 22,539 km^{2} (8,702 sq mi)

Population (2023)
  - Total: 1,060,931
  - Density: 47.1/km^{2} (122/sq mi)

Literacy
  - Literacy rate: Total: (49.65%); Male: (55.23%); Female: (43.46%)
- Time zone: UTC+5 (PST)
- Number of Tehsils: 5

Kech District (Balochi: ضلع کیچ) is a district in the Balochistan province of Pakistan. This district's old name was Turbat District which was changed to its even older name Kech District in 1994–1995.

On 24 February 2026, The Tump tehsil upgraded to district status after the bifurcation of Kech district.

== Administration ==
The district of Kech is administratively subdivided into the following tehsils, each of which contains several villages:

Tehsil	Area (km^{2})	Pop. (2023)	Density (ppl/km^{2}) (2023)	Literacy rate (2023)	Union Councils
Turbat Tehsil	9,742	470,605	48.31	63.65%	...
Balnigor Tehsil	1,238	50,404	40.71	38.77%	...
Buleda Tehsil	1,997	107,847	54.00	35.36%	...
Dasht Tehsil	2,486	90,080	36.23	37.25%	...
Hoshab Tehsil	2,213	66,566	30.08	30.71%	...

== Demographics ==
=== Population ===
Historical population
Year	Pop.	±% p.a.
1951	83,631	—
1961	70,326	−1.72%
1972	147,978	+7.00%
1981	379,467	+11.03%
1998	413,204	+0.50%
2017	907,182	+4.23%
2023	1,060,931	+2.64%

As of the 2023 census, Kech district has 253,475 households and a population of 1,060,931. The district has a sex ratio of 109.82 males to 100 females and a literacy rate of 49.65%: 55.23% for males and 43.46% for females. 328,574 (30.97% of the surveyed population) are under 10 years of age. 386,646 (36.44%) live in urban areas.

=== Language ===
Balochi was the predominant language, spoken by 98.9% of the population, with very small minorities of Urdu, Kashmiri, and Brahui, and speakers.

Languages of Kech District (2023 Census)
1. Balochi (98.9%)
2. Urdu (0.26%)
3. Kashmiri (0.10%)
4. Brahui (0.03%)
5. Others (0.71%)

=== Religion ===
In the 2023 census, 0.41% (4,331) of the population was from religious minorities, mainly Christians.

== See also ==
- Tehsils in Pakistan
  - Tehsils of Balochistan
  - Tehsils of Punjab, Pakistan
  - Tehsils of Khyber Pakhtunkhwa
  - Tehsils of Sindh, Pakistan
  - Tehsils of Azad Kashmir
  - Tehsils of Gilgit-Baltistan
- Districts of Pakistan
  - Districts of Khyber Pakhtunkhwa
  - Districts of Punjab, Pakistan
  - Districts of Balochistan, Pakistan
  - Districts of Sindh, Pakistan
  - Districts of Azad Kashmir
  - Districts of Gilgit-Baltistan
- Divisions of Pakistan
  - Divisions of Balochistan
  - Divisions of Khyber Pakhtunkhwa
  - Divisions of Punjab, Pakistan
  - Divisions of Sindh
  - Divisions of Azad Kashmir
  - Divisions of Gilgit-Baltistan
