= Kach (disambiguation) =

Kach is a banned far-right political party in Israel

Kach may also refer to:

== Places ==
In Iran:

- Kach, Hamadan
- Kach, Khuzestan
- Koch, Chabahar, Sistan and Baluchestan Province
- Koch, Dashtiari, Chabahar County, Sistan and Baluchestan Province
- Koch-e Garg, Chabahar County, Sistan and Baluchestan Province
- Koch Gowrow, Chabahar County, Sistan and Baluchestan Province
- Koch-e Yusof, Chabahar County, Sistan and Baluchestan Province
- Kach Kurin, Iranshahr County, Sistan and Baluchestan Province
- Kach Kush, Iranshahr County, Sistan and Baluchestan Province
- Kach, Qasr-e Qand, Sistan and Baluchestan Province

Other places:

- Kach, Pakistan, a town in Pakistan
- Kach Banda, a town in Hangu District, Pakistan
- Kach Gandava, a region of Balochistan, Pakistan
- Pa Gach-e Lahbari, a village in Iran also known as Kach

== Other ==
- Arnold Käch (1914–1998), Swiss military officer and skier
- Tanya Nicole Kach (born 1981), American formerly missing person
- Wade Kach, American politician
