= Sand-e =

Sand or Send (Persian: سند) in Iran may refer to:

== Gilan Province ==
- Send-e Bala
- Send-e Pain

== Sistan and Baluchestan Province ==
- Sand-e Bahram
- Sand-e Hamzeh
- Sand-e Mir Suiyan
- Send-e Morad
- Sand-e Nur Mohammad
- Sand-e Mir Suiyan Rural District
