= Ripak =

Ripak (Persian: ريپك) may refer to:

- Ripak-e Abdok
- Ripak-e Lal Mohammad
- Ripak-e Pirandad
- Ripak-e Saleh
- Ripak-e Shiran
