= Karam Bal =

Karam Bal or Karambel (Persian: كرمبل), also rendered as Karim Bal, may refer to:

- Karam Bal-e Bakhshi
- Karam Bal-e Faqir
- Karam Bal-e Khodadad
- Karam Bal-e Ramazan
