= Sitar, Iran (disambiguation) =

Sitar, Iran is a village in Sistan and Baluchestan Province, Iran.

Sitar (Persian: سيتار) in Iran may also refer to:

- Sitar-e Abdol Rahim, Sistan and Baluchestan Province
- Sitar-e Ali, Sistan and Baluchestan Province
- Sitar-e Mahmud, Sistan and Baluchestan Province

== See also ==
- Sitar (disambiguation)
