= Sammach =

Sammach (Persian: سماچ) may refer to:

- Sammach-e Korg
- Sammach-e Mahmud
- Sammach-e Miru
