= Dempak Bazar =

Village in Sistan and Baluchestan province, Iran

Dempak Bazar Persian: دمپك بازار
- Village
- Location within Iran
- Coordinates: 25°42′26″N 61°21′57″E
- Country: Iran
- Province: Sistan and Baluchestan
- County: Dashtiari
- District: Bahu Kalat
- Rural District: Bahu Kalat

Population (2016)
  - Total: 2,234
- Time zone: UTC+3:30 (IRST)

Dempak Bazar (Persian: دمپك بازار) (Note: Also romanized as Dempak Bāzār; also known as Dempag and Dempak) is a village in, and the capital of, Bahu Kalat Rural District of Bahu Kalat District, Dashtiari County, Sistan and Baluchestan province, Iran. The previous capital of the rural district was the village of Bahu Kalat.

== Demographics ==
=== Population ===
At the time of the 2006 National Census, the village's population was 1,599 in 315 households, when it was in the former Dashtiari District of Chabahar County. The following census in 2011 counted 1,676 people in 387 households. The 2016 census measured the population of the village as 2,234 people in 572 households.

In 2018, the district was separated from the county in the establishment of Dashtiari County, and the rural district was transferred to the new Bahu Kalat District.
