= Darkas =

Village in Sistan and Baluchestan province, Iran

Darkas Persian: دركس
- Village
- Location within Iran
- Coordinates: 25°50′42″N 61°30′19″E
- Country: Iran
- Province: Sistan and Baluchestan
- County: Dashtiari
- District: Bahu Kalat
- Rural District: Darkas

Population (2016)
  - Total: 3,959
- Time zone: UTC+3:30 (IRST)

Darkas (Persian: دركس) (Note: Also known as Dargas and Dargaz) is a village in, and the capital of, Darkas Rural District of Bahu Kalat District, Dashtiari County, Sistan and Baluchestan province, Iran.

== Demographics ==
=== Population ===
At the time of the 2006 National Census, the village's population was 2,159 in 459 households, when it was in Bahu Kalat Rural District of the former Dashtiari District of Chabahar County. The following census in 2011 counted 1,863 people in 386 households. The 2016 census measured the population of the village as 3,959 people in 882 households. It was the most populous village in Bahu Kalat Rural District.

In 2018, the district was separated from the county in the establishment of Dashtiari County, and the rural district was transferred to the new Bahu Kalat District. Darkas was transferred to Darkas Rural District created in the district.
