= Delegan =

Delegan or Dalgan (Persian: دلگان) may refer to:

- Delegan-e Madrasah
- Delegan-e Mazan Far
- Delegan-e Molla Faqir
- Delegan-e Sheykh Cheragh
- Dalgan County
