= Nakuch =

Nakuch نكوچ
- Village
- Location within Iran
- Coordinates: 25°26′33″N 61°15′53″E
- Country: Iran
- Province: Sistan and Baluchestan
- County: Chabahar
- Bakhsh: Dashtiari
- Rural District: Negur

Population (2006)
  - Total: 169
- Time zone: UTC+3:30 (IRST)
  - Summer (DST): UTC+4:30 (IRDT)

Nakuch (Persian: نكوچ, also Romanized as Nakūch; also known as Nowguch) is a village in Negur Rural District, Dashtiari District, Chabahar County, Sistan and Baluchestan Province, Iran. At the 2006 census, its population was 169, in 27 families.
