= Sand-e Mir Suiyan =

Village in Sistan and Baluchestan province, Iran

Sand-e Mir Suiyan Persian: سند ميرثويان
- Village
- Location within Iran
- Coordinates: 25°22′56″N 61°16′15″E
- Country: Iran
- Province: Sistan and Baluchestan
- County: Dashtiari
- District: Central
- Rural District: Sand-e Mir Suiyan

Population (2016)
  - Total: 956
- Time zone: UTC+3:30 (IRST)

Sand-e Mir Suiyan (Persian: سند ميرثويان) (Note: Also romanized as Sand-e Mīr S̄ūīyān; also known as Sand Mīr Sha‘bān, Sand Mīr Sūbān, Sand-e Mīrsha‘bān, Sand-e Mīrsūbān, and Sand-e Mīrs̄ūbān) is a village in, and the capital of, Sand-e Mir Suiyan Rural District of the Central District of Dashtiari County, Sistan and Baluchestan province, Iran.

== Demographics ==
=== Population ===
At the time of the 2006 National Census, the village's population was 1,087 in 207 households, when it was in the former Dashtiari District of Chabahar County. The following census in 2011 counted 989 people in 214 households. The 2016 census measured the population of the village as 956 people in 223 households.

In 2018, the district was separated from the county in the establishment of Dashtiari County, and the rural district was transferred to the new Central District.
