= Dehgandar =

Dehgandar ده گندر
- Village
- Location within Iran
- Coordinates: 25°40′00″N 61°29′00″E
- Country: Iran
- Province: Sistan and Baluchestan
- County: Chabahar
- Bakhsh: Dashtiari
- Rural District: Bahu Kalat

Population (2006)
  - Total: 95
- Time zone: UTC+3:30 (IRST)
  - Summer (DST): UTC+4:30 (IRDT)

Dehgandar (Persian: ده گندر ; also known as Dehqāndar) is a village in Bahu Kalat Rural District, Dashtiari District, Chabahar County, Sistan and Baluchestan Province, Iran. At the 2006 census, its population was 95, in 19 families.
