= Rimdan =

Rimdan (Persian: ريمدان) may refer to:

- Rimdan-e Avval
- Rimdan-e Bankul
- Rimdan Kamal
- Rimdan-e Shah Vali Mohammad
