= Ball-e Dad Rahman =

Ball-e Dad Rahman بل دادرحمان
- Village
- Location within Iran
- Coordinates: 25°40′29″N 61°17′33″E
- Country: Iran
- Province: Sistan and Baluchestan
- County: Chabahar
- Bakhsh: Dashtiari
- Rural District: Bahu Kalat

Population (2006)
  - Total: 120
- Time zone: UTC+3:30 (IRST)
  - Summer (DST): UTC+4:30 (IRDT)

Ball-e Dad Rahman (Persian: بل دادرحمان, also Romanized as Ball-e Dād Raḩmān and Bal-e Dād Raḩmān) is a village in Bahu Kalat Rural District, Dashtiari District, Chabahar County, Sistan and Baluchestan Province, Iran. At the 2006 census, its population was 120, in 21 families.
