= Karagi-ye Pain =

Karagi-ye Pain كرگي پائين
- Village
- Location within Iran
- Coordinates: 25°27′54″N 61°08′31″E
- Country: Iran
- Province: Sistan and Baluchestan
- County: Chabahar
- Bakhsh: Dashtiari
- Rural District: Bahu Kalat

Population (2006)
  - Total: 140
- Time zone: UTC+3:30 (IRST)
  - Summer (DST): UTC+4:30 (IRDT)

Karagi-ye Pain (Persian: كرگي پائين, also Romanized as Karagī-ye Pā’īn; also known as Karag) is a village in Bahu Kalat Rural District, Dashtiari District, Chabahar County, Sistan and Baluchestan Province, Iran. At the 2006 census, its population was 140, in 24 families.
