= Chil Sar =

Chil Sar (Persian: چيلسر) may refer to:

- Chil Sar, Dashtiari
- Chil Sar, Polan
