= Laku Kach =

Laku Kach لكوكچ
- Village
- Location within Iran
- Coordinates: 25°23′51″N 61°16′10″E
- Country: Iran
- Province: Sistan and Baluchestan
- County: Chabahar
- Bakhsh: Dashtiari
- Rural District: Sand-e Mir Suiyan

Population (2006)
  - Total: 229
- Time zone: UTC+3:30 (IRST)
  - Summer (DST): UTC+4:30 (IRDT)

Laku Kach (Persian: لكوكچ, also Romanized as Lakū Kach; also known as Lakū Kaj) is a village in Sand-e Mir Suiyan Rural District, Dashtiari District, Chabahar County, Sistan and Baluchestan Province, Iran. At the 2006 census, its population was 229, in 46 families.
