= Kahnanikash =

Kahnanikash كهناني كش
- Village
- Location within Iran
- Coordinates: 25°54′39″N 61°31′53″E
- Country: Iran
- Province: Sistan and Baluchestan
- County: Chabahar
- Bakhsh: Dashtiari
- Rural District: Bahu Kalat

Population (2006)
  - Total: 339
- Time zone: UTC+3:30 (IRST)
  - Summer (DST): UTC+4:30 (IRDT)

Kahnanikash (Persian: كهناني كش, also Romanized as Kahnānīkash; also known as Kahan Kāsh, Kahnān Kash, and Kapānāl Kash) is a village in Bahu Kalat Rural District, Dashtiari District, Chabahar County, Sistan and Baluchestan Province, Iran. At the 2006 census, its population was 339, in 67 families.
