= Nowris =

Nowris نوريس
- Village
- Location within Iran
- Coordinates: 25°29′18″N 61°09′56″E
- Country: Iran
- Province: Sistan and Baluchestan
- County: Chabahar
- Bakhsh: Dashtiari
- Rural District: Negur

Population (2006)
  - Total: 380
- Time zone: UTC+3:30 (IRST)
  - Summer (DST): UTC+4:30 (IRDT)

Nowris (Persian: نوريس, also Romanized as Nowrīs) is a village in Negur Rural District, Dashtiari District, Chabahar County, Sistan and Baluchestan Province, Iran. At the 2006 census, its population was 380, in 82 families.
