= Kahir-e Borz =

Kahir-e Borz (Persian: كهيربرز) may refer to:

- Kahir-e Borz-e Bala
- Kahir-e Borz-e Pain
