= Gabolani =

Gabolani گبولاني
- Village
- Location within Iran
- Coordinates: 25°46′00″N 61°26′00″E
- Country: Iran
- Province: Sistan and Baluchestan
- County: Chabahar
- Bakhsh: Dashtiari
- Rural District: Bahu Kalat

Population (2006)
  - Total: 369
- Time zone: UTC+3:30 (IRST)
  - Summer (DST): UTC+4:30 (IRDT)

Gabolani (also misspelled as Gabulani or Gabul) (Persian: گبولاني, also Romanized as Gabolānī; also known as Ayūb Bāzār) is a village in Bahu Kalat Rural District, Dashtiari District, Chabahar County, Sistan and Baluchestan Province, Iran. At the 2006 census, its population was 369, in 55 families.
