= Bahu Kalat =

Village in Sistan and Baluchestan province, Iran

Bahu Kalat Persian: باهوكلات
- Village
- Location within Iran
- Coordinates: 25°42′55″N 61°25′06″E
- Country: Iran
- Province: Sistan and Baluchestan
- County: Dashtiari
- District: Bahu Kalat
- Rural District: Bahu Kalat

Population (2016)
  - Total: 1,055
- Time zone: UTC+3:30 (IRST)

Bahu Kalat (Persian: باهوكلات) (Note: Also romanized as Bāhū Kalāt) is a village in, and the former capital of, Bahu Kalat Rural District of Bahu Kalat District, Dashtiari County, Sistan and Baluchestan province, Iran, serving as capital of the district. The capital of the rural district has been transferred to the village of Dempak Bazar.

== Demographics ==
=== Population ===
At the time of the 2006 National Census, the village's population was 1,016 in 198 households, when it was in the former Dashtiari District of Chabahar County. The following census in 2011 counted 1,294 people in 264 households. The 2016 census measured the population of the village as 1,055 people in 221 households.

In 2018, the district was separated from the county in the establishment of Dashtiari County, and the rural district was transferred to the new Bahu Kalat District.
