= Dust Mohammad Bazar =

Dust Mohammad Bazar دوست محمدبازار
- Village
- Country: Iran
- Province: Sistan and Baluchestan
- County: Chabahar
- Bakhsh: Dashtiari
- Rural District: Negur

Population (2006)
  - Total: 208
- Time zone: UTC+3:30 (IRST)
  - Summer (DST): UTC+4:30 (IRDT)

Dust Mohammad Bazar (Persian: دوست محمدبازار, also Romanized as Dūst Moḩammad Bāzār) is a village in Negur Rural District, Dashtiari District, Chabahar County, Sistan and Baluchestan Province, Iran. At the 2006 census, its population was 208, in 37 families.
