= Sitar (disambiguation) =

A sitar (Sanskrit: सितार; Punjabi: ਸਿਤਾਰ) is a South-Asian musical instrument.

Sitar may also refer to:

== Places ==
- Sitar, Iran (disambiguation), (Persian: سيتار in Iran)
  - Sitar, Iran, in Sand-e Mir Suiyan Rural District, Dashtiari District, Chabahar County, Sistan and Baluchestan Province; a village
  - Sitar-e Abdol Rahim, also called "Sītār", in Sand-e Mir Suiyan Rural District, Dashtiari District, Chabahar County, Sistan and Baluchestan Province, Iran; a village

== People with the name ==
- Jeff Sitar, a world champion safecracker
- Lord Sitar, the stage name of the musician Big Jim Sullivan (1941-2012) and the title of his 1968 sitar music album

== Brands and enterprises ==
- SITAR, a French aircraft company which manufactured the SITAR GY-110 Sher Khan
- Swedish Indian IT Resources AB (or SITAR), a division of Tata Consultancy Services

== See also ==
- Satar (disambiguation)
- Setar (disambiguation)
