= Chagherbit =

Chagherbit (Persian: چغربيت), also rendered as Joghrbit and Jowgharbit, may refer to:

- Chagherbit-e Bala
- Chagherbit-e Pain
