= Rimlan =

Rimlan (Persian: ريملان) may refer to:

- Rimlan-e Kamal
- Rimlan-e Pain
- Rimlan-e Vosta
