= Garm Bit =

Garm Bit (Persian: گرم بيت) may refer to:

- Garm Bit-e Bala
- Garm Bit-e Pain
