= Yaqub Bazar =

Yaqub Bazar يعقوب بازار
- Village
- Location within Iran
- Coordinates: 25°41′00″N 61°24′00″E
- Country: Iran
- Province: Sistan and Baluchestan
- County: Chabahar
- Bakhsh: Dashtiari
- Rural District: Bahu Kalat

Population (2006)
  - Total: 240
- Time zone: UTC+3:30 (IRST)
  - Summer (DST): UTC+4:30 (IRDT)

Yaqub Bazar (Persian: يعقوب بازار, also Romanized as Ya‘qūb Bāzār) is a village in Bahu Kalat Rural District, Dashtiari District, Chabahar County, Sistan and Baluchestan Province, Iran. It had 240 residents in 47 families as of the 2006 Census.
