= Gorudal =

Gorudal گرودل
- Village
- Location within Iran
- Coordinates: 25°57′01″N 61°33′12″E
- Country: Iran
- Province: Sistan and Baluchestan
- County: Chabahar
- Bakhsh: Dashtiari
- Rural District: Bahu Kalat

Population (2006)
  - Total: 176
- Time zone: UTC+3:30 (IRST)
  - Summer (DST): UTC+4:30 (IRDT)

Gorudal (Persian: گرودل, also Romanized as Gorūdal) is a village in Bahu Kalat Rural District, Dashtiari District, Chabahar County, Sistan and Baluchestan Province, Iran. At the 2006 census, its population was 176, in 50 families.
