= Abdollah Bazar =

Abdollah Bazar عبداله بازار
- Village
- Location within Iran
- Coordinates: 25°29′57″N 61°14′32″E
- Country: Iran
- Province: Sistan and Baluchestan
- County: Chabahar
- Bakhsh: Dashtiari
- Rural District: Negur

Population (2006)
  - Total: 172
- Time zone: UTC+3:30 (IRST)
  - Summer (DST): UTC+4:30 (IRDT)

Abdollah Bazar (Persian: عبداله بازار, also Romanized as ‘Abdollāh Bāzār) is a village in Negur Rural District, Dashtiari District, Chabahar County, Sistan and Baluchestan Province, Iran. At the 2006 census, its population was 172, in 35 families.
