= Nowbandian =

Nowbandian (Persian: نوبنديان) may refer to:

- Nowbandian-e Baluchi
- Nowbandian-e Pain
