= Rostam Bazar Nalant =

Rostam Bazar Nalant رستم بازار نلنت
- Village
- Country: Iran
- Province: Sistan and Baluchestan
- County: Chabahar
- Bakhsh: Dashtiari
- Rural District: Bahu Kalat

Population (2006)
  - Total: 131
- Time zone: UTC+3:30 (IRST)
  - Summer (DST): UTC+4:30 (IRDT)

Rostam Bazar Nalant (Persian: رستم بازار نلنت, also Romanized as Rostam Bāzār Nalant) is a village in Bahu Kalat Rural District, Dashtiari District, Chabahar County, Sistan and Baluchestan Province, Iran. At the 2006 census, its population was 131, in 44 families.
