= Ruhgam =

Ruhgam (Persian: روهگام), also rendered as Rohgam, may refer to:

- Ruhgam-e Bala
- Ruhgam-e Pain
