= Gorgich =

Gorgich گرگيچ
- Village
- Location within Iran
- Coordinates: 25°32′37″N 61°13′08″E
- Country: Iran
- Province: Sistan and Baluchestan
- County: Chabahar
- Bakhsh: Dashtiari
- Rural District: Negur

Population (2006)
  - Total: 479
- Time zone: UTC+3:30 (IRST)
  - Summer (DST): UTC+4:30 (IRDT)

Gorgich (Persian: گرگيچ, also Romanized as Gorgīch; also known as Gorgej Umār, Gorg-e Ūmār, Gorgīj, Gūrgīj, and Korakī Jān) is a village in Negur Rural District, Dashtiari District, Chabahar County, Sistan and Baluchestan Province, Iran. At the 2006 census, its population was 479, in 80 families.
