= Hut Gat Jahli =

Hut Gat Jahli هوت گت جهلي
- Village
- Location within Iran
- Coordinates: 25°47′21″N 61°29′27″E
- Country: Iran
- Province: Sistan and Baluchestan
- County: Chabahar
- Bakhsh: Dashtiari
- Rural District: Bahu Kalat

Population (2006)
  - Total: 702
- Time zone: UTC+3:30 (IRST)
  - Summer (DST): UTC+4:30 (IRDT)

Hut Gat Jahli (Persian: هوت گت جهلي, also Romanized as Hūt Gat Jahlī; also known as Hūt Gat and Hūtgat-e Pā’īn) is a village in Bahu Kalat Rural District, Dashtiari District, Chabahar County, Sistan and Baluchestan Province, Iran. At the 2006 census, its population was 702, in 123 families.
