= Juyik =

Juyik جوئيک
- Village
- Location within Iran
- Coordinates: 25°44′00″N 61°27′00″E
- Country: Iran
- Province: Sistan and Baluchestan
- County: Chabahar
- Bakhsh: Dashtiari
- Rural District: Bahu Kalat

Population (2006)
  - Total: 273
- Time zone: UTC+3:30 (IRST)
  - Summer (DST): UTC+4:30 (IRDT)

Juyik (Persian: جوئيک, also Romanized as Jūyīk; also known as Jūyīg) is a village in Bahu Kalat Rural District, Dashtiari District, Chabahar County, Sistan and Baluchestan Province, Iran. At the 2006 census, its population was 273, in 46 families.
