= Shir Govaz =

Shir Govaz شيرگواز
- Village
- Location within Iran
- Coordinates: 25°45′05″N 61°27′44″E
- Country: Iran
- Province: Sistan and Baluchestan
- County: Chabahar
- Bakhsh: Dashtiari
- Rural District: Bahu Kalat

Population (2006)
  - Total: 553
- Time zone: UTC+3:30 (IRST)
  - Summer (DST): UTC+4:30 (IRDT)

Shir Govaz (Persian: شيرگواز, also Romanized as Shīr Govāz and Shīr Gavāz) is a village in Bahu Kalat Rural District, Dashtiari District, Chabahar County, Sistan and Baluchestan Province, Iran. At the 2006 census, its population was 553, in 126 families.
