= Dakk-e Bahu =

Dakk-e Bahu دك باهو
- Village
- Location within Iran
- Coordinates: 25°35′45″N 61°17′40″E
- Country: Iran
- Province: Sistan and Baluchestan
- County: Chabahar
- Bakhsh: Dashtiari
- Rural District: Bahu Kalat

Population (2006)
  - Total: 565
- Time zone: UTC+3:30 (IRST)
  - Summer (DST): UTC+4:30 (IRDT)

Dakk-e Bahu (Persian: دك باهو, also Romanized as Dakk-e Bāhū and Dak-e Bāhū) is a village in Bahu Kalat Rural District, Dashtiari District, Chabahar County, Sistan and Baluchestan Province, Iran. At the 2006 census, its population was 565, in 130 families.
