= Esmail Bazar Mahrek Jamik =

Esmail Bazar Mahrek Jamik اسماعيل بازار مهرك جميك
- Village
- Country: Iran
- Province: Sistan and Baluchestan
- County: Chabahar
- Bakhsh: Dashtiari
- Rural District: Bahu Kalat

Population (2006)
  - Total: 123
- Time zone: UTC+3:30 (IRST)
  - Summer (DST): UTC+4:30 (IRDT)

Esmail Bazar Mahrek Jamik (Persian: اسماعيل بازار مهرك جميك, also Romanized as Esmāʿīl Bāzār Mahrek Jamīk) is a village in Bahu Kalat Rural District, Dashtiari District, Chabahar County, Sistan and Baluchestan Province, Iran. At the 2006 census, its population was 123, in 27 families.
