= Kalber =

Village in Sistan and Baluchestan province, Iran

Kalber Persian: کالبر
- Village
- Location within Iran
- Coordinates: 25°17′49″N 61°09′01″E
- Country: Iran
- Province: Sistan and Baluchestan
- County: Dashtiari
- District: Central
- Rural District: Negur

Population (2016)
  - Total: 1,280
- Time zone: UTC+3:30 (IRST)

Kalber (Persian: کالبر) (Note: Also romanized as Kālbar and Kālber; also known as Kālber-e Bālā) is a village in Negur Rural District of the Central District of Dashtiari County, Sistan and Baluchestan province, Iran.

== Demographics ==
=== Population ===
At the time of the 2006 National Census, the village's population was 1,085 in 197 households, when it was in the former Dashtiari District of Chabahar County. The following census in 2011 counted 1,369 people in 250 households. The 2016 census measured the population of the village as 1,280 people in 270 households. It was the most populous village in its rural district.

In 2018, the district was separated from the county in the establishment of Dashtiari County, and the rural district was transferred to the new Central District.
