= Hajji Nur Mohammad Bazar =

Hajji Nur Mohammad Bazar حاجي نور محمد بازار
- Village
- Country: Iran
- Province: Sistan and Baluchestan
- County: Chabahar
- Bakhsh: Dashtiari
- Rural District: Negur

Population (2006)
  - Total: 464
- Time zone: UTC+3:30 (IRST)
  - Summer (DST): UTC+4:30 (IRDT)

Hajji Nur Mohammad Bazar (Persian: حاجي نور محمد بازار, also Romanized as Ḩājjī Nūr Moḩammad Bāzār) is a village in Negur Rural District, Dashtiari District, Chabahar County, Sistan and Baluchestan Province, Iran. At the 2006 census, its population was 464, in 74 families.
