= Hajji Qaderdad Bazar =

Hajji Qaderdad Bazar حاجي قادرداد بازار
- Village
- Location within Iran
- Coordinates: 25°29′57″N 61°14′28″E
- Country: Iran
- Province: Sistan and Baluchestan
- County: Chabahar
- Bakhsh: Dashtiari
- Rural District: Negur

Population (2006)
  - Total: 211
- Time zone: UTC+3:30 (IRST)
  - Summer (DST): UTC+4:30 (IRDT)

Hajji Qaderdad Bazar (Persian: حاجي قادرداد بازار, also Romanized as Ḩājjī Qāderdād Bāzār; also known as Ḩājīqāder Bāzār) is a village in Negur Rural District, Dashtiari District, Chabahar County, Sistan and Baluchestan Province, Iran. At the 2006 census, its population was 211, in 37 families.
