= Nowbandian-e Pain =

Village in Sistan and Baluchestan province, Iran

Nowbandian-e Pain Persian: نوبنديان پائين
- Village
- Location within Iran
- Coordinates: 25°29′46″N 61°10′39″E
- Country: Iran
- Province: Sistan and Baluchestan
- County: Dashtiari
- District: Central
- Rural District: Negur

Population (2016)
  - Total: 1,271
- Time zone: UTC+3:30 (IRST)

Nowbandian-e Pain (Persian: نوبنديان پائين) (Note: Also romanized as Nowbandīān-e Pā’īn; also known as Nowbandīān-e Kāfeh) is a village in, and the capital of, Negur Rural District of the Central District of Dashtiari County, Sistan and Baluchestan province, Iran.

== Demographics ==
=== Population ===
At the time of the 2006 National Census, the village's population was 1,044 in 204 households, when it was in the former Dashtiari District of Chabahar County. The census in 2011 counted 1,151 people in 262 households. The 2016 census measured the population of the village as 1,271 people in 353 households.

In 2018, the district was separated from the county in the establishment of Dashtiari County, and the rural district was transferred to the new Central District.
