= Sital =

Sital (Persian: سيتل) may refer to:

- Sital (25°27′ N 61°15′ E), Chabahar
- Sital (25°29′ N 61°10′ E), Chabahar
