= Sari Gat Hut Gat Bala =

Sari Gat Hut Gat Bala سري گت هوت گت بالا
- Village
- Country: Iran
- Province: Sistan and Baluchestan
- County: Chabahar
- Bakhsh: Dashtiari
- Rural District: Bahu Kalat

Population (2006)
  - Total: 283
- Time zone: UTC+3:30 (IRST)
  - Summer (DST): UTC+4:30 (IRDT)

Sari Gat Hut Gat Bala (Persian: سري گت هوت گت بالا, also Romanized as Sarī Gat Hūt Gat Bālā) is a village in Bahu Kalat Rural District, Dashtiari District, Chabahar County, Sistan and Baluchestan Province, Iran. At the 2006 census, its population was 283, in 54 families.
