= Halgodari =

Halgodari (Persian: هلگدارئ), also known as Khalaqdari, may refer to:

- Halgodari-ye Ashraf
- Halgodari-ye Osman
