= Kolarai =

Kolarai کلرائي
- Village
- Location within Iran
- Coordinates: 25°28′49″N 61°17′24″E
- Country: Iran
- Province: Sistan and Baluchestan
- County: Chabahar
- Bakhsh: Dashtiari
- Rural District: Sand-e Mir Suiyan

Population (2006)
  - Total: 275
- Time zone: UTC+3:30 (IRST)
  - Summer (DST): UTC+4:30 (IRDT)

Kolarai (Persian: کلرائي, also Romanized as Kolarā’ī; also known as Kalleh Rāhī) is a village in Sand-e Mir Suiyan Rural District, Dashtiari District, Chabahar County, Sistan and Baluchestan Province, Iran. At the 2006 census, its population was 275, with 62 families.
