= Panjshanbeh Bazar =

Panjshanbeh Bazar (Persian: پنجشنبه بازار) may refer to:

- Panjshanbeh Bazar, Chabahar
- Panjshanbeh Bazar, Dashtiari, Chabahar County
