= Densar Mowladad =

Densar Mowladad دنسر مولاداد
- Village
- Location within Iran
- Coordinates: 25°42′27″N 61°23′28″E
- Country: Iran
- Province: Sistan and Baluchestan
- County: Chabahar
- Bakhsh: Dashtiari
- Rural District: Bahu Kalat

Population (2006)
  - Total: 47
- Time zone: UTC+3:30 (IRST)
  - Summer (DST): UTC+4:30 (IRDT)

Densar Mowladad (Persian: دنسر مولاداد, also Romanized as Densar Mowlādād; also known as Densar Mowldād) is a village in Bahu Kalat Rural District, Dashtiari District, Chabahar County, Sistan and Baluchestan Province, Iran. At the 2006 census, its population was 47, in 9 families.
