= Satar (disambiguation) =

Satar may refer to:

== Places ==
- Satar, Iran (Persian: سطر), a municipality in Kolyai District, Sonqor County, Kermanshah Province
- Satar Rural District (Persian: دهستان سطر), Kolyai District, Sonqor County, Kermanshah Province, Iran
- Satar, Deoghar, Deoghar District, Jharkhand State, India; a village

== People ==
Given name

- Sattar also spelled "Satar" (Arabic: ستار), a male Muslim given name

Surname

- Alif Satar (born 1990) Malaysian actor-singer
- Aziz Satar (1925–2014) Malaysian actor-singer-comedian
- Mostafa Abdel Satar (born 1990) Egyptian soccer player
- Yakup Satar (1898–2008) last surviving Ottoman Turkish veteran of WWI

== Other uses ==
- Za'atar also spelled "satar" (Arabic: زَعْتَر; Hebrew: זעתר), a family of herbs, that includes basil, thyme, savory, oregano.
- Sataer also spelled "satar" Uyghur: ساتار), a type of Uyghur lute
- SATAR, former name of the USAF experimental satellite series called "Orbiting Vehicle"

== See also ==
- Abdul Satar, a given name
- Sattar
- Sitar (disambiguation)
- Setar (disambiguation)
