= Dalgan =

Dalgan may refer to:

- Dalgan County, an administrative subdivision of Iran
- Dalgan Park, a seminary of the Missionary Society of St. Columban located initially at Dalgan Park in Shrule, County Mayo, and later at Dalgan Park in Navan, County Meath, both in Ireland
- Delegan (disambiguation)
- Dezocine, trade name Dalgan, a pharmaceutical
