= Ruhgam-e Pain =

Ruhgam-e Pain روهگام پائين
- Village
- Location within Iran
- Coordinates: 25°35′31″N 61°29′28″E
- Country: Iran
- Province: Sistan and Baluchestan
- County: Chabahar
- Bakhsh: Dashtiari
- Rural District: Bahu Kalat

Population (2006)
  - Total: 118
- Time zone: UTC+3:30 (IRST)
  - Summer (DST): UTC+4:30 (IRDT)

Ruhgam-e Pain (Persian: روهگام پائين, also Romanized as Rūhgām-e Pā’īn; also known as Rohgām-e Pā’īn) is a village in Bahu Kalat Rural District, Dashtiari District, Chabahar County, Sistan and Baluchestan Province, Iran. At the 2006 census, its population was 118, in 24 families.
