= Karam Bal-e Bakhshi =

Karam Bal-e Bakhshi كرمبل بخشي
- Village
- Location within Iran
- Coordinates: 25°24′01″N 61°08′12″E
- Country: Iran
- Province: Sistan and Baluchestan
- County: Chabahar
- Bakhsh: Dashtiari
- Rural District: Negur

Population (2006)
  - Total: 339
- Time zone: UTC+3:30 (IRST)
  - Summer (DST): UTC+4:30 (IRDT)

Karam Bal-e Bakhshi (Persian: كرمبل بخشي, also Romanized as Karam Bal-e Bakhshī; also known as Karīm Bāl) is a village in Negur Rural District, Dashtiari District, Chabahar County, Sistan and Baluchestan Province, Iran. At the 2006 census, its population was 339, in 65 families.
