= Ripak-e Pirandad =

Ripak-e Pirandad ريپك پيرانداد
- Village
- Location within Iran
- Coordinates: 25°32′00″N 61°10′13″E
- Country: Iran
- Province: Sistan and Baluchestan
- County: Chabahar
- Bakhsh: Dashtiari
- Rural District: Negur

Population (2006)
  - Total: 109
- Time zone: UTC+3:30 (IRST)
  - Summer (DST): UTC+4:30 (IRDT)

Ripak-e Pirandad (Persian: ريپك پيرانداد, also Romanized as Rīpak-e Pīrāndād; also known as Pīrāndād Bāzār) is a village in Negur Rural District, Dashtiari District, Chabahar County, Sistan and Baluchestan Province, Iran. At the 2006 census, its population was 109, in 23 families.
