= Delegan-e Sheykh Cheragh =

Delegan-e Sheykh Cheragh دلگان شيخ چراغ
- Village
- Location within Iran
- Coordinates: 25°27′52″N 61°15′17″E
- Country: Iran
- Province: Sistan and Baluchestan
- County: Chabahar
- Bakhsh: Dashtiari
- Rural District: Negur

Population (2006)
  - Total: 466
- Time zone: UTC+3:30 (IRST)
  - Summer (DST): UTC+4:30 (IRDT)

Delegan-e Sheykh Cheragh (Persian: دلگان شيخ چراغ, also Romanized as Delegān-e Sheykh Cherāgh; also known as Dalgān-e Pā’īn and Delegān-e Pā’īn) is a village in Negur Rural District, Dashtiari District, Chabahar County, Sistan and Baluchestan Province, Iran. At the 2006 census, its population was 466, in 92 families.
