= Chil Sar, Dashtiari =

Chil Sar چيلسر
- Village
- Location within Iran
- Coordinates: 25°25′29″N 61°18′42″E
- Country: Iran
- Province: Sistan and Baluchestan
- County: Chabahar
- Bakhsh: Dashtiari
- Rural District: Sand-e Mir Suiyan

Population (2006)
  - Total: 209
- Time zone: UTC+3:30 (IRST)
  - Summer (DST): UTC+4:30 (IRDT)

Chil Sar (Persian: چيلسر, also Romanized as Chīl Sar; also known as Chīleh Sar, Nīlag, and Tembū’ī) is a village in Sand-e Mir Suiyan Rural District, Dashtiari District, Chabahar County, Sistan and Baluchestan Province, Iran. At the 2006 census, its population was 209, in 44 families.
