= Beris, Sistan and Baluchestan =

City in Sistan and Baluchestan province, Iran

Beris Persian: بريس
- City
- Location within Iran
- Coordinates: 25°08′08″N 61°11′26″E
- Country: Iran
- Province: Sistan and Baluchestan
- County: Dashtiari
- District: Central

Population (2016)
  - Total: 4,488
- Time zone: UTC+3:30 (IRST)

Beris (Persian: بريس) (Note: Also romanized as Berīs; also known as Berīs-e Bālā) is a city in the Central District of Dashtiari County, Sistan and Baluchestan province, Iran.

== Demographics ==
=== Population ===
At the time of the 2006 National Census, Beris's population was 2,356 in 477 households, when it was a village in Sand-e Mir Suiyan Rural District of the former Dashtiari District of Chabahar County. The following census in 2011 counted 4,428 people in 800 households. The 2016 census measured the population of the village as 4,488 people in 863 households. It was the most populous village in its rural district.

After the census, Beris was elevated to the status of a city. In 2018, the district was separated from the county in the establishment of Dashtiari County. The city and the rural district were transferred to the new Central District.
