= Sand-e Nur Mohammad =

Sand-e Nur Mohammad سندنورمحمد
- Village
- Location within Iran
- Coordinates: 25°30′56″N 61°16′25″E
- Country: Iran
- Province: Sistan and Baluchestan
- County: Chabahar
- Bakhsh: Dashtiari
- Rural District: Bahu Kalat

Population (2006)
  - Total: 637
- Time zone: UTC+3:30 (IRST)
  - Summer (DST): UTC+4:30 (IRDT)

Sand-e Nur Mohammad (Persian: سندنورمحمد, also Romanized as Sand-e Nūr Moḩammad; also known as Sand, Sand Bāhū, Sand-e Bāhū, and Sīşad) is a village in Bahu Kalat Rural District, Dashtiari District, Chabahar County, Sistan and Baluchestan Province, Iran. At the 2006 census, its population was 637, in 103 families.
