= Panjshanbeh Bazar, Dashtiari =

Panjshanbeh Bazar پنجشنبه بازار
- Village
- Location within Iran
- Coordinates: 25°52′12″N 61°29′50″E
- Country: Iran
- Province: Sistan and Baluchestan
- County: Chabahar
- Bakhsh: Dashtiari
- Rural District: Bahu Kalat

Population (2006)
  - Total: 172
- Time zone: UTC+3:30 (IRST)
  - Summer (DST): UTC+4:30 (IRDT)

Panjshanbeh Bazar (Persian: پنجشنبه بازار, also Romanized as Panjshanbeh Bāzār; also known as Panjshanbeh) is a village in Bahu Kalat Rural District, Dashtiari District, Chabahar County, Sistan and Baluchestan Province, Iran. At the 2006 census, its population was 172, in 38 families.
