= Kahiri, Chabahar =

Kahiri كهيري
- Village
- Location within Iran
- Coordinates: 25°46′00″N 61°24′00″E
- Country: Iran
- Province: Sistan and Baluchestan
- County: Chabahar
- Bakhsh: Dashtiari
- Rural District: Bahu Kalat

Population (2006)
  - Total: 278
- Time zone: UTC+3:30 (IRST)
  - Summer (DST): UTC+4:30 (IRDT)

Kahiri (Persian: كهيري, also Romanized as Kahīrī; also known as Kāhīr and Koch Gowrow) is a village in Bahu Kalat Rural District, Dashtiari District, Chabahar County, Sistan and Baluchestan, Iran. At the 2006 census, its population was 278, in 50 families.
