= Karam Bal-e Ramazan =

Karam Bal-e Ramazan كرمبل رمضان
- Village
- Location within Iran
- Coordinates: 25°26′15″N 61°08′37″E
- Country: Iran
- Province: Sistan and Baluchestan
- County: Chabahar
- Bakhsh: Dashtiari
- Rural District: Negur

Population (2006)
  - Total: 224
- Time zone: UTC+3:30 (IRST)
  - Summer (DST): UTC+4:30 (IRDT)

Karam Bal-e Ramazan (Persian: كرمبل رمضان, also Romanized as Karam Bal-e Ramaẕān; also known as Karīm Bāl) is a village in Negur Rural District, Dashtiari District, Chabahar County, Sistan and Baluchestan Province, Iran. At the 2006 census, its population was 224, in 54 families.
