= Send-e Morad =

Send-e Morad سندمراد
- Village
- Location within Iran
- Coordinates: 25°24′01″N 61°15′16″E
- Country: Iran
- Province: Sistan and Baluchestan
- County: Chabahar
- Bakhsh: Dashtiari
- Rural District: Sand-e Mir Suiyan

Population (2006)
  - Total: 538
- Time zone: UTC+3:30 (IRST)
  - Summer (DST): UTC+4:30 (IRDT)

Send-e Morad (Persian: سندمراد, also Romanized as Send-e Morād) is a village in Sand-e Mir Suiyan Rural District, Dashtiari District, Chabahar County, Sistan and Baluchestan Province, Iran. At the 2006 census, its population was 538, in 98 families.
