= Ruhgam-e Bala =

Ruhgam-e Bala روهگام بالا
- Village
- Location within Iran
- Coordinates: 25°35′00″N 61°31′00″E
- Country: Iran
- Province: Sistan and Baluchestan
- County: Chabahar
- Bakhsh: Dashtiari
- Rural District: Bahu Kalat

Population (2006)
  - Total: 345
- Time zone: UTC+3:30 (IRST)
  - Summer (DST): UTC+4:30 (IRDT)

Ruhgam-e Bala (Persian: روهگام بالا, also Romanized as Rūhgām-e Bālā; also known as Rohgām-e Bālā) is a village in Bahu Kalat Rural District, Dashtiari District, Chabahar County, Sistan and Baluchestan Province, Iran. At the 2006 census, its population was 345, in 71 families.
