= Koch-e Garg =

Koch-e Garg كچ گرگ
- Village
- Location within Iran
- Coordinates: 25°27′53″N 61°08′29″E
- Country: Iran
- Province: Sistan and Baluchestan
- County: Chabahar
- Bakhsh: Dashtiari
- Rural District: Negur

Population (2006)
  - Total: 223
- Time zone: UTC+3:30 (IRST)
  - Summer (DST): UTC+4:30 (IRDT)

Koch-e Garg (Persian: كچ گرگ; also known as Koch-e Karg) is a village in Negur Rural District, Dashtiari District, Chabahar County, Sistan and Baluchestan Province, Iran. At the 2006 census, its population was 223, in 42 families.
