= Halgodari-ye Ashraf =

Halgodari-ye Ashraf هلگدارئ اشرف
- Village
- Location within Iran
- Coordinates: 25°27′47″N 61°12′15″E
- Country: Iran
- Province: Sistan and Baluchestan
- County: Chabahar
- Bakhsh: Dashtiari
- Rural District: Negur

Population (2006)
  - Total: 243
- Time zone: UTC+3:30 (IRST)
  - Summer (DST): UTC+4:30 (IRDT)

Halgodari-ye Ashraf (Persian: هلگدارئ اشرف, also Romanized as Halgodāri Āshraf; also known as Khalaqdāri-ye Āshraf) is a village in Negur Rural District, Dashtiari District, Chabahar County, Sistan and Baluchestan Province, Iran. At the 2006 census, its population was 243, in 42 families.
