= Sent (disambiguation) =

Sent refers to a thing that his been conveyed volitionally.

Sent may also refer to:

- Sent, Switzerland, former municipality in the district of Inn
- SENT (protocol), point-to-point scheme for transmitting signal values
- Sent (novel), 2009 young-adult novel by Margaret Peterson Haddix
- Esther-Mirjam Sent (born 1967), Dutch economist, academic, and politician
- Sent, 1/100th of an Estonian kroon

== See also ==
- Sent M'Ahesa (1883–1970), Swedish dancer, translator and journalist
- Cent (disambiguation)
- Scent
- Send (disambiguation)
- Sint (disambiguation)
