= Darkas Rural District =

Rural district in Sistan and Baluchestan province, Iran

Darkas Rural District Persian: دهستان درگس
- Rural District
- Location within Iran
- Coordinates: 25°53′13″N 61°29′56″E
- Country: Iran
- Province: Sistan and Baluchestan
- County: Dashtiari
- District: Bahu Kalat
- Capital: Darkas
- Time zone: UTC+3:30 (IRST)

Darkas Rural District (Persian: دهستان درگس) is in Bahu Kalat District of Dashtiari County, Sistan and Baluchestan province, Iran. Its capital is the village of Darkas, whose population at the time of the 2016 National Census was 3,959 in 882 households.

== History ==
In 2018, Dashtiari District was separated from Chabahar County in the establishment of Dashtiari County, and Darkas Rural District was created in the new Bahu Kalat District.
