= Chagherbit-e Pain =

Chagherbit-e Pain چغربيت پائين
- Village
- Location within Iran
- Coordinates: 25°50′38″N 61°31′20″E
- Country: Iran
- Province: Sistan and Baluchestan
- County: Chabahar
- Bakhsh: Dashtiari
- Rural District: Bahu Kalat

Population (2006)
  - Total: 138
- Time zone: UTC+3:30 (IRST)
  - Summer (DST): UTC+4:30 (IRDT)

Chagherbit-e Pain (Persian: چغربيت پائين, also Romanized as Chagherbīt-e Pā’īn; also known as Jowgharbīt and Joghrbīt) is a village in Bahu Kalat Rural District, Dashtiari District, Chabahar County, Sistan and Baluchestan Province, Iran. At the 2006 census, its population was 138, in 30 families.
