= Sitar-e Mahmud =

Sitar-e Mahmud سيتارمحمود
- Village
- Location within Iran
- Coordinates: 25°25′00″N 61°14′00″E
- Country: Iran
- Province: Sistan and Baluchestan
- County: Chabahar
- Bakhsh: Dashtiari
- Rural District: Sand-e Mir Suiyan

Population (2006)
  - Total: 495
- Time zone: UTC+3:30 (IRST)
  - Summer (DST): UTC+4:30 (IRDT)

Sitar-e Mahmud (Persian: سيتارمحمود, also Romanized as Sītār-e Maḩmūd) is a village in Sand-e Mir Suiyan Rural District, Dashtiari District, Chabahar County, Sistan and Baluchestan Province, Iran. At the 2006 census, its population was 495, in 111 families.
