= Rimdan-e Bankul =

Rimdan-e Bankul ريمدان بنکول
- village
- Location within Iran
- Coordinates: 25°23′59″N 61°27′02″E
- Country: Iran
- Province: Sistan and Baluchestan
- County: Chabahar
- Bakhsh: Dashtiari
- Rural District: Sand-e Mir Suiyan

Population (2006)
  - Total: 623
- Time zone: UTC+3:30 (IRST)
  - Summer (DST): UTC+4:30 (IRDT)

Rimdan-e Bankul (Persian: ريمدان بنکول, also Romanized as Rīmdān-e Bankūl; also known as Rīmdān-e Bangūl) is a village in Sand-e Mir Suiyan Rural District, Dashtiari District, Chabahar County, Sistan and Baluchestan Province, Iran. At the 2006 census, its population was 623, in 147 families.
