= Delegan-e Molla Faqir =

Delegan-e Molla Faqir دلگان ملا فقير
- Village
- Country: Iran
- Province: Sistan and Baluchestan
- County: Chabahar
- Bakhsh: Dashtiari
- Rural District: Negur

Population (2006)
  - Total: 258
- Time zone: UTC+3:30 (IRST)
  - Summer (DST): UTC+4:30 (IRDT)

Delegan-e Molla Faqir (Persian: دلگان ملا فقير, also Romanized as Delegān-e Mollā Faqīr) is a village in Negur Rural District, Dashtiari District, Chabahar County, Sistan and Baluchestan Province, Iran. At the 2006 census, its population was 258, in 47 families.
