= Kalbar =

Kalbar may refer to:

- West Kalimantan, known in Indonesian as Kalimantan Barat and abbreviated to Kalbar
- Kalbar, Iran, a village in Sistan and Baluchestan Province, Iran
- Kalbar, Queensland, a small town near Boonah, in southeastern Queensland, Australia
- South Kolan, Queensland, in the Bundaberg Region, Australia, which historically contains a neighbourhood called Kalbar
