= Sand-e Bahram =

Sand-e Bahram سندبهرام
- Village
- Location within Iran
- Coordinates: 25°20′03″N 61°18′15″E
- Country: Iran
- Province: Sistan and Baluchestan
- County: Chabahar
- Bakhsh: Dashtiari
- Rural District: Sand-e Mir Suiyan

Population (2006)
  - Total: 400
- Time zone: UTC+3:30 (IRST)
  - Summer (DST): UTC+4:30 (IRDT)

Sand-e Bahram (Persian: سندبهرام, also Romanized as Sand-e Bahrām) is a village in Sand-e Mir Suiyan Rural District, Dashtiari District, Chabahar County, Sistan and Baluchestan Province, Iran. At the 2006 census, its population was 400, in 57 families.
