= Sital (25°27′ N 61°15′ E), Chabahar =

Sital سيتل
- Village
- Location within Iran
- Coordinates: 25°27′02″N 61°15′18″E
- Country: Iran
- Province: Sistan and Baluchestan
- County: Chabahar
- Bakhsh: Dashtiari
- Rural District: Negur

Population (2006)
  - Total: 366
- Time zone: UTC+3:30 (IRST)
  - Summer (DST): UTC+4:30 (IRDT)

Sital (Persian: سيتل, also Romanized as Sītal) is a village in Negur Rural District, Dashtiari District, Chabahar County, Sistan and Baluchestan Province, Iran. At the 2006 census, its population was 366, in 68 families.
