= Garm Bit-e Pain =

Garm Bit-e Pain گرم بيت پائين
- Village
- Location within Iran
- Coordinates: 25°52′09″N 61°31′02″E
- Country: Iran
- Province: Sistan and Baluchestan
- County: Chabahar
- Bakhsh: Dashtiari
- Rural District: Bahu Kalat

Population (2006)
  - Total: 532
- Time zone: UTC+3:30 (IRST)
  - Summer (DST): UTC+4:30 (IRDT)

Garm Bit-e Pain (Persian: گرم بيت پائين, also Romanized as Garm Bīt-e Pāīn) is a village in Bahu Kalat Rural District, Dashtiari District, Chabahar County, Sistan and Baluchestan Province, Iran. At the 2006 census, its population was 532, in 108 families.
