= Nowbandian-e Baluchi =

Nowbandian-e Baluchi نوبنديان بلوچي
- Village
- Location within Iran
- Coordinates: 25°28′26″N 61°09′56″E
- Country: Iran
- Province: Sistan and Baluchestan
- County: Chabahar
- Bakhsh: Dashtiari
- Rural District: Negur

Population (2006)
  - Total: 457
- Time zone: UTC+3:30 (IRST)
  - Summer (DST): UTC+4:30 (IRDT)

Nowbandian-e Baluchi (Persian: نوبنديان بلوچي, also Romanized as Nowbandīān-e Balūchī; also known as Balūchī) is a village in Negur Rural District, Dashtiari District, Chabahar County, Sistan and Baluchestan Province, Iran. At the 2006 census, its population was 457, in 90 families.
