= Karam Bal-e Faqir =

Karam Bal-e Faqir كرمبل فقير
- Village
- Location within Iran
- Coordinates: 25°25′14″N 61°08′20″E
- Country: Iran
- Province: Sistan and Baluchestan
- County: Chabahar
- Bakhsh: Dashtiari
- Rural District: Negur

Population (2006)
  - Total: 477
- Time zone: UTC+3:30 (IRST)
  - Summer (DST): UTC+4:30 (IRDT)

Karam Bal-e Faqir (Persian: كرمبل فقير, also Romanized as Karam Bal-e Faqīr; also known as Karambel and Karīm Bāl) is a village in Negur Rural District, Dashtiari District, Chabahar County, Sistan and Baluchestan Province, Iran. At the 2006 census, its population was 477, in 92 families.
