= Ripak-e Shiran =

Ripak-e Shiran ريپك شيران
- Village
- Location within Iran
- Coordinates: 25°31′52″N 61°09′59″E
- Country: Iran
- Province: Sistan and Baluchestan
- County: Chabahar
- Bakhsh: Dashtiari
- Rural District: Negur

Population (2006)
  - Total: 216
- Time zone: UTC+3:30 (IRST)
  - Summer (DST): UTC+4:30 (IRDT)

Ripak-e Shiran (Persian: ريپك شيران, also Romanized as Rīpak-e Shīrān; also known as Shīrān Bāzār) is a village in Negur Rural District, Dashtiari District, Chabahar County, Sistan and Baluchestan Province, Iran. At the 2006 census, its population was 216, in 41 families.
