= Ripak-e Lal Mohammad =

Ripak-e Lal Mohammad ريپك لال محمد
- Village
- Country: Iran
- Province: Sistan and Baluchestan
- County: Chabahar
- Bakhsh: Dashtiari
- Rural District: Negur

Population (2006)
  - Total: 129
- Time zone: UTC+3:30 (IRST)
  - Summer (DST): UTC+4:30 (IRDT)

Ripak-e Lal Mohammad (Persian: ريپك لال محمد, also Romanized as Rīpak-e Lāl Moḩammad) is a village in Negur Rural District, Dashtiari District, Chabahar County, Sistan and Baluchestan Province, Iran. At the 2006 census, its population was 129, in 21 families.
