= Koch-e Yusof =

Koch-e Yusof كچ يوسف
- Village
- Location within Iran
- Coordinates: 25°27′06″N 61°08′35″E
- Country: Iran
- Province: Sistan and Baluchestan
- County: Chabahar
- Bakhsh: Dashtiari
- Rural District: Negur

Population (2006)
  - Total: 645
- Time zone: UTC+3:30 (IRST)
  - Summer (DST): UTC+4:30 (IRDT)

Koch-e Yusof (Persian: كچ يوسف, also Romanized as Koch-e Yūsof; also known as Koch) is a village in Negur Rural District, Dashtiari District, Chabahar County, Sistan and Baluchestan Province, Iran. At the 2006 census, its population was 645, in 120 families.
