= Potshot =

Potshot may refer to:

- Potshot (band), a former J-ska music group from Japan
- Potshot (novel), a Spenser novel by Robert B. Parker
- Potshot Lake, Minnesota, an unorganized territory
- Potshot, the codename for a WWII base that is now Exmouth, Western Australia
- Pot-shots, a form of literary art attributed to epigrammist Ashleigh Brilliant

== See also ==
- Poshot, a village in Sistan and Baluchestan Province, Iran
