= Garm Bit-e Bala =

Garm Bit-e Bala گرم بيت بالا
- Village
- Location within Iran
- Coordinates: 25°53′26″N 61°31′01″E
- Country: Iran
- Province: Sistan and Baluchestan
- County: Chabahar
- Bakhsh: Dashtiari
- Rural District: Bahu Kalat

Population (2006)
  - Total: 828
- Time zone: UTC+3:30 (IRST)
  - Summer (DST): UTC+4:30 (IRDT)

Garm Bit-e Bala (Persian: گرم بيت بالا, also Romanized as Garm Bīt-e Bālā) is a village in Bahu Kalat Rural District, Dashtiari District, Chabahar County, Sistan and Baluchestan Province, Iran. At the 2006 census, its population was 828, in 176 families.
