= Send (disambiguation) =

To send something is to convey it volitionally.

Send or SEND may also refer to:

== Send ==
- Send (album), a 2003 album by the rock band Wire
- The Send, an American alternative rock band
- Send, Surrey, a village in England
  - Send (HM Prison), a women's prison in Send, Surrey
- Send, Iran (disambiguation), places in Iran
- Aux-send, an output from an audio mixer which is usually designed to carry a given channel to an effects or monitor device
- Send! (magazine), a Christian missionary magazine by Gospel for Asia

== SEND ==
- Secure Neighbor Discovery, a security extension of the Neighbor Discovery Protocol
- Satellite Emergency Notification Device
- Standard for Exchange of Non-clinical Data
- Special educational needs and disability, an acronym used in the UK

== See also ==
- Send It (disambiguation)
- Sent (disambiguation)
