= Delegan-e Madrasah =

Delegan-e Madrasah دلگان مدرسه
- Village
- Country: Iran
- Province: Sistan and Baluchestan
- County: Chabahar
- Bakhsh: Dashtiari
- Rural District: Negur

Population (2006)
  - Total: 154
- Time zone: UTC+3:30 (IRST)
  - Summer (DST): UTC+4:30 (IRDT)

Delegan-e Madrasah (Persian: دلگان مدرسه, also Romanized as Delegān-e Madrasah) is a village in Negur Rural District, Dashtiari District, Chabahar County, Sistan and Baluchestan Province, Iran. At the 2006 census, its population was 154, in 41 families.
