= Karam Bal-e Khodadad =

Karam Bal-e Khodadad كرمبل خداداد
- Village
- Location within Iran
- Coordinates: 25°25′16″N 61°08′36″E
- Country: Iran
- Province: Sistan and Baluchestan
- County: Chabahar
- Bakhsh: Dashtiari
- Rural District: Negur

Population (2006)
  - Total: 270
- Time zone: UTC+3:30 (IRST)
  - Summer (DST): UTC+4:30 (IRDT)

Karam Bal-e Khodadad (Persian: كرمبل خداداد, also Romanized as Karam Bal-e Khodādād; also known as Karīm Bāl) is a village in Negur Rural District, Dashtiari District, Chabahar County, Sistan and Baluchestan Province, Iran. At the 2006 census, its population was 270, in 59 families.
