= Ripak-e Saleh =

Ripak-e Saleh ريپك صالح
- Village
- Location within Iran
- Coordinates: 25°31′02″N 61°10′46″E
- Country: Iran
- Province: Sistan and Baluchestan
- County: Chabahar
- Bakhsh: Dashtiari
- Rural District: Negur

Population (2006)
  - Total: 680
- Time zone: UTC+3:30 (IRST)
  - Summer (DST): UTC+4:30 (IRDT)

Ripak-e Saleh (Persian: ريپك صالح, also Romanized as Rīpak-e Şāleḩ; also known as Rīpak-e Şāleḩ Bāzār) is a village in Negur Rural District, Dashtiari District, Chabahar County, Sistan and Baluchestan Province, Iran. At the 2006 census, its population was 680, in 140 families.
