= Halgodari-ye Osman =

Halgodari-ye Osman هلگدارئ عثمان
- Village
- Location within Iran
- Coordinates: 25°28′11″N 61°12′23″E
- Country: Iran
- Province: Sistan and Baluchestan
- County: Chabahar
- Bakhsh: Dashtiari
- Rural District: Negur

Population (2006)
  - Total: 110
- Time zone: UTC+3:30 (IRST)
  - Summer (DST): UTC+4:30 (IRDT)

Halgodari-ye Osman (Persian: هلگدارئ عثمان, also Romanized as Halgodāri-ye ʿOs̄mān; also known as Khalaqdāri-ye ʿOs̄mān) is a village in Negur Rural District, Dashtiari District, Chabahar County, Sistan and Baluchestan Province, Iran. At the 2006 census, its population was 110, in 19 families.
