= Sammach-e Miru =

Sammach-e Miru سماچ ميرو
- Village
- Location within Iran
- Coordinates: 25°21′07″N 61°11′37″E
- Country: Iran
- Province: Sistan and Baluchestan
- County: Chabahar
- Bakhsh: Dashtiari
- Rural District: Negur

Population (2006)
  - Total: 420
- Time zone: UTC+3:30 (IRST)
  - Summer (DST): UTC+4:30 (IRDT)

Sammach-e Miru (Persian: سماچ ميرو, also Romanized as Sammāch-e Mīrū; also known as Sammāch) is a village in Negur Rural District, Dashtiari District, Chabahar County, Sistan and Baluchestan Province, Iran. At the 2006 census, its population was 420, in 81 families.
