= Mazan Pad =

Mazan Pad مزن پاد
- Village
- Location within Iran
- Coordinates: 25°27′30″N 61°15′20″E
- Country: Iran
- Province: Sistan and Baluchestan
- County: Chabahar
- Bakhsh: Dashtiari
- Rural District: Negur

Population (2006)
  - Total: 301
- Time zone: UTC+3:30 (IRST)
  - Summer (DST): UTC+4:30 (IRDT)

Mazan Pad (Persian: مزن پاد, also Romanized as Mazan Pād; also known as Delegān-e Mazan Far, Mazan Pādak, and Mazan Pat) is a village in Negur Rural District, Dashtiari District, Chabahar County, Sistan and Baluchestan Province, Iran. At the 2006 census, its population was 301, in 61 families.
