= Ripak-e Abdok =

Ripak-e Abdok ريپك عبدك
- Village
- Location within Iran
- Coordinates: 25°32′19″N 61°09′40″E
- Country: Iran
- Province: Sistan and Baluchestan
- County: Chabahar
- Bakhsh: Dashtiari
- Rural District: Negur

Population (2006)
  - Total: 357
- Time zone: UTC+3:30 (IRST)
  - Summer (DST): UTC+4:30 (IRDT)

Ripak-e Abdok (Persian: ريپك عبدك, also Romanized as Rīpak-e ʿAbdok) is a village in Negur Rural District, Dashtiari District, Chabahar County, Sistan and Baluchestan Province, Iran. At the 2006 census, its population was 357, in 68 families.
