= Kahir-e Borz-e Bala =

Kahir-e Borz-e Bala كهيربرزبالا
- Village
- Location within Iran
- Coordinates: 25°54′50″N 61°31′14″E
- Country: Iran
- Province: Sistan and Baluchestan
- County: Chabahar
- Bakhsh: Dashtiari
- Rural District: Bahu Kalat

Population (2006)
  - Total: 557
- Time zone: UTC+3:30 (IRST)
  - Summer (DST): UTC+4:30 (IRDT)

Kahir-e Borz-e Bala (Persian: كهيربرزبالا, also Romanized as Kahīr-e Borz-e Bālā; also known as Kahīr-e Borz) is a village in Bahu Kalat Rural District, Dashtiari District, Chabahar County, Sistan and Baluchestan Province, Iran. At the 2006 census, its population was 557, in 115 families.
