= Poshot =

Poshot پشت
- Village
- Location within Iran
- Coordinates: 25°05′37″N 61°21′24″E
- Country: Iran
- Province: Sistan and Baluchestan
- County: Chabahar
- Bakhsh: Dashtiari
- Rural District: Sand-e Mir Suiyan

Population (2006)
  - Total: 220
- Time zone: UTC+3:30 (IRST)
  - Summer (DST): UTC+4:30 (IRDT)

Poshot (Persian: پشت; also known as Ḩasan Kenār, Poshad, Poshd, Pūshāt, Pūshāt, Pūshowd, and Pūsht) is a village in Sand-e Mir Suiyan Rural District, Dashtiari District, Chabahar County, Sistan and Baluchestan Province, Iran. At the 2006 census, its population was 220, in 44 families.
