= Sammach-e Mahmud =

Sammach-e Mahmud سماچ محمود
- Village
- Location within Iran
- Coordinates: 25°19′06″N 61°11′11″E
- Country: Iran
- Province: Sistan and Baluchestan
- County: Chabahar
- Bakhsh: Dashtiari
- Rural District: Negur

Population (2006)
  - Total: 564
- Time zone: UTC+3:30 (IRST)
  - Summer (DST): UTC+4:30 (IRDT)

Sammach-e Mahmud (Persian: سماچ محمود, also Romanized as Sammāch-e Maḩmūd; also known as Samāch-e Mollāmaḩmūd) is a village in Negur Rural District, Dashtiari District, Chabahar County, Sistan and Baluchestan Province, Iran. At the 2006 census, its population was 564, in 104 families.
