= Chagherbit-e Bala =

Chagherbit-e Bala چغربيت بالا
- Village
- Location within Iran
- Coordinates: 25°50′38″N 61°31′20″E
- Country: Iran
- Province: Sistan and Baluchestan
- County: Chabahar
- Bakhsh: Dashtiari
- Rural District: Bahu Kalat

Population (2006)
  - Total: 47
- Time zone: UTC+3:30 (IRST)
  - Summer (DST): UTC+4:30 (IRDT)

Chagherbit-e Bala (Persian: چغربيت بالا, also Romanized as Chagherbīt-e Bālā; also known as Jowgharbīt and Joghrbīt) is a village in Bahu Kalat Rural District, Dashtiari District, Chabahar County, Sistan and Baluchestan Province, Iran. At the 2006 census, its population was 47, in 10 families.
