= Sand-e Hamzeh =

Sand-e Hamzeh سندحمزه
- Village
- Location within Iran
- Coordinates: 25°21′37″N 61°17′09″E
- Country: Iran
- Province: Sistan and Baluchestan
- County: Chabahar
- Bakhsh: Dashtiari
- Rural District: Sand-e Mir Suiyan

Population (2006)
  - Total: 534
- Time zone: UTC+3:30 (IRST)
  - Summer (DST): UTC+4:30 (IRDT)

Sand-e Hamzeh (Persian: سندحمزه, also Romanized as Sand-e Ḩamzeh and Sand Ḩamzeh; also known as Sand) is a village in Sand-e Mir Suiyan Rural District, Dashtiari District, Chabahar County, Sistan and Baluchestan Province, Iran. At the 2006 census, its population was 534, in 88 families.
