= Sitar-e Ali =

Sitar-e Ali سيتار علي
- Village
- Location within Iran
- Coordinates: 25°24′01″N 61°15′18″E
- Country: Iran
- Province: Sistan and Baluchestan
- County: Chabahar
- Bakhsh: Dashtiari
- Rural District: Sand-e Mir Suiyan

Population (2006)
  - Total: 135
- Time zone: UTC+3:30 (IRST)
  - Summer (DST): UTC+4:30 (IRDT)

Sitar-e Ali (Persian: سيتار علي, also Romanized as Sītār-e ‘Alī; also known as Sītār-e Morād and Sītār-e Mowlādād) is a village in Sand-e Mir Suiyan Rural District, Dashtiari District, Chabahar County, Sistan and Baluchestan Province, Iran. At the 2006 census, its population was 135, in 32 families.
