= Sammach-e Korg =

Sammach-e Korg سماچ كرگ
- Village
- Location within Iran
- Coordinates: 25°19′38″N 61°09′12″E
- Country: Iran
- Province: Sistan and Baluchestan
- County: Chabahar
- Bakhsh: Dashtiari
- Rural District: Negur

Population (2006)
  - Total: 412
- Time zone: UTC+3:30 (IRST)
  - Summer (DST): UTC+4:30 (IRDT)

Sammach-e Korg (Persian: سماچ كرگ, also Romanized as Sammāch-e Korg; also known as Sammāch-e Garag) is a village in Negur Rural District, Dashtiari District, Chabahar County, Sistan and Baluchestan Province, Iran. At the 2006 census, its population was 412, in 69 families.
