= Setar (disambiguation) =

Setar is an Iranian musical instrument.

Setar may also refer to:

- SETAR NV, a telecommunications service provider for Aruba
- SETAR (model), a statistical Self-Exciting Autoregressive model typically applied to time series data

== See also ==
- Sitar (disambiguation)
- Satar (disambiguation)
