= Sitar, Iran =

Sitar سيتار
- Village
- Location within Iran
- Coordinates: 25°25′20″N 61°14′28″E
- Country: Iran
- Province: Sistan and Baluchestan
- County: Chabahar
- Bakhsh: Dashtiari
- Rural District: Sand-e Mir Suiyan

Population (2006)
  - Total: 313
- Time zone: UTC+3:30 (IRST)
  - Summer (DST): UTC+4:30 (IRDT)

Sitar (Persian: سيتار, also Romanized as Sītār and Saitār; also known as Sītār-e ‘Olyā and Sītār-e ‘Omar) is a village in Sand-e Mir Suiyan Rural District, Dashtiari District, Chabahar County, Sistan and Baluchestan Province, Iran. At the 2006 census, its population was 313, in 66 families.
