= Sint (disambiguation) =

Sint is a 2010 Dutch horror film.

Sint may also refer to:

- The Saint (1997 film), a 1997 Simon Templar film
- Sint., taxonomic author abbreviation of Paul Sintenis

== See also ==
- The Saint (disambiguation)
- Sent (disambiguation)
