= Rimlan-e Kamal =

Rimlan-e Kamal ريملان كمال
- Village
- Location within Iran
- Coordinates: 25°25′38″N 61°26′26″E
- Country: Iran
- Province: Sistan and Baluchestan
- County: Chabahar
- Bakhsh: Dashtiari
- Rural District: Sand-e Mir Suiyan

Population (2006)
  - Total: 162
- Time zone: UTC+3:30 (IRST)
  - Summer (DST): UTC+4:30 (IRDT)

Rimlan-e Kamal (Persian: ريملان كمال, also Romanized as Rīmlān-e Kamāl; also known as Moḩammad Kamāl and Rīmdān Kamāl) is a village in Sand-e Mir Suiyan Rural District, Dashtiari District, Chabahar County, Sistan and Baluchestan Province, Iran. At the 2006 census, its population was 162, in 37 families.
