= Send It (disambiguation) =

"Send It" is a 2016 song by Austin Mahone featuring Rich Homie Quan.

Send It may also refer to:

- Send It (album), a 1977 album by Ashford & Simpson
- "Send It", a song by Bliss n Eso from their 2021 album The Sun
- "Send It", a song by Electric Light Orchestra from their 1986 album Balance of Power

== Other uses ==
- "Send It!", a 2020 song by Hooligan Hefs

== See also ==
- Send (disambiguation)
- Send It On (disambiguation)
