= Bahu Kalat District =

District in Sistan and Baluchestan province, Iran

Bahu Kalat District Persian: بخش باهوکلات
- District
- Location within Iran
- Coordinates: 25°42′38″N 61°33′16″E
- Country: Iran
- Province: Sistan and Baluchestan
- County: Dashtiari
- Capital: Bahu Kalat
- Time zone: UTC+3:30 (IRST)

Bahu Kalat District (Persian: بخش باهوکلات) is in Dashtiari County, Sistan and Baluchestan province, Iran. Its capital is the village of Bahu Kalat, whose population at the time of the 2016 census was 1,055 people in 221 households.

== History ==
In 2018, Dashtiari District was separated from Chabahar County in the establishment of Dashtiari County, which was divided into two districts of two rural districts each, with the city of Negur as its capital.

== Demographics ==
=== Administrative divisions ===
Bahu Kalat District
Administrative Divisions
Bahu Kalat RD
Darkas RD
RD = Rural District
