= Sitar-e Abdol Rahim =

Sitar-e Abdol Rahim سيتارعبدالرحيم
- village
- Location within Iran
- Coordinates: 25°24′34″N 61°15′10″E
- Country: Iran
- Province: Sistan and Baluchestan
- County: Chabahar
- Bakhsh: Dashtiari
- Rural District: Sand-e Mir Suiyan

Population (2006)
  - Total: 140
- Time zone: UTC+3:30 (IRST)
  - Summer (DST): UTC+4:30 (IRDT)

Sitar-e Abdol Rahim (Persian: سيتارعبدالرحيم, also Romanized as Sītār-e ʿAbdol Raḩīm; also known as Sītār-e Shahdād and Sītār) is a village in Sand-e Mir Suiyan Rural District, Dashtiari District, Chabahar County, Sistan and Baluchestan Province, Iran. At the 2006 census, its population was 140, in 31 families.
