= Send It On =

Send It On may refer to:

- "Send It On" (D'Angelo song), 2000
- "Send It On" (Disney song), 2009

== See also ==
- Send It (disambiguation)
