= Kach Banda =

Coordinates: 33°32′58″N 71°5′1″E

- Town and union council
- Interactive map of Kach Banda
- Country: Pakistan
- Province: Khyber-Pakhtunkhwa
- District: Hangu District
- Elevation: 785 m (2,575 ft)
- Time zone: UTC+5 (PST)

Kach Banda is a town and union council in Hangu District of Khyber-Pakhtunkhwa. It is located at 33°32'58N 71°5'10E and has an altitude of 785 metres (2578 feet).
