= Sent M'Ahesa =

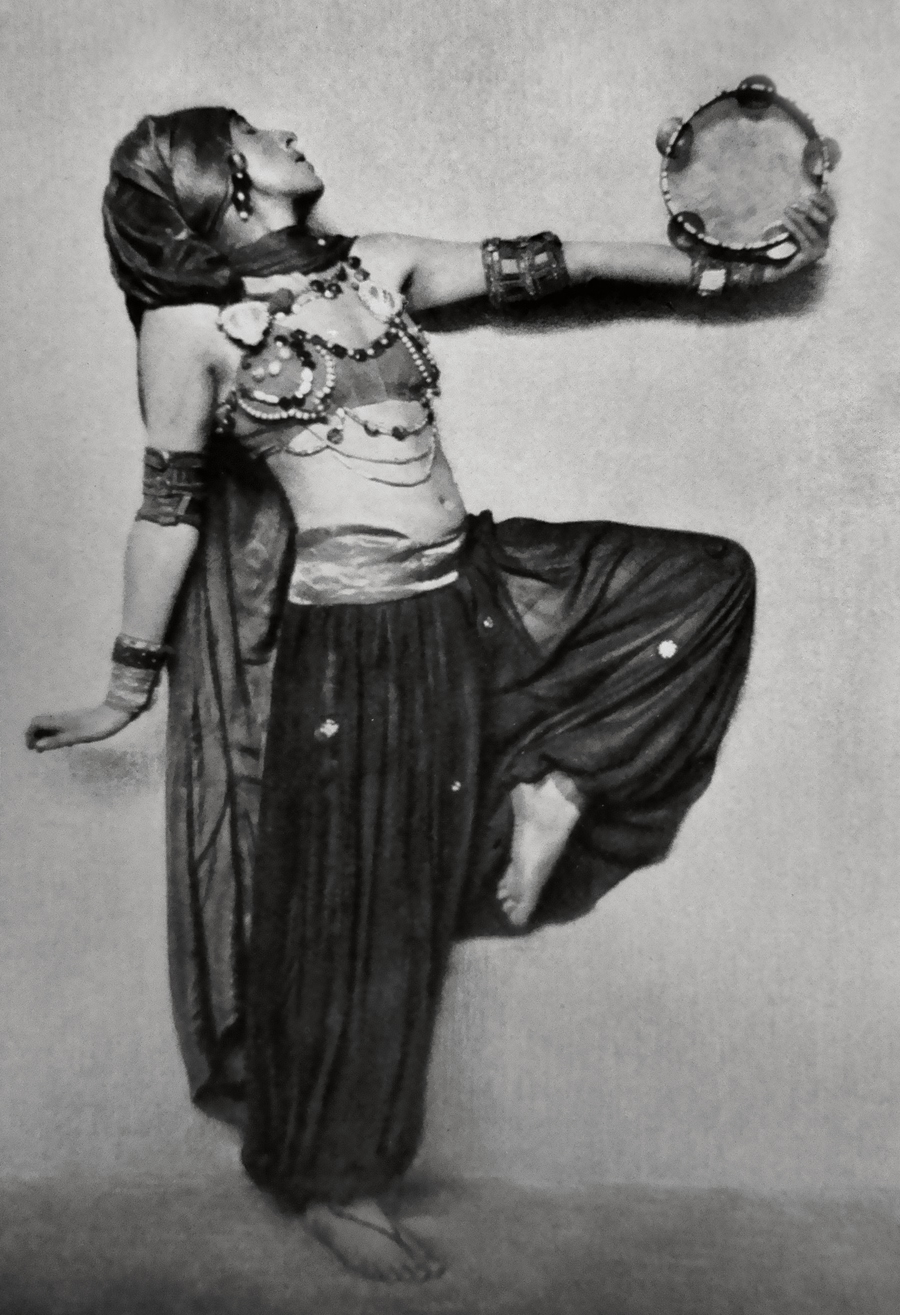
Sent M'Ahesa pictured by Hanns Holdt circa 1928

Sent M'Ahesa, pseudonym of Else von Carlberg (17 August 1883 – 19 November 1970) was a Swedish dancer, translator and journalist.

== Biography ==
Else Margaretha Luisa von Carlberg was born in Riga on August 17, 1883, the eldest child of Jutta Paling and Nikolai Walter-Carlberg, a government official and city secretary of Riga from 1890 to 1917.

In 1907 she moved to Berlin with her sister Erika, who later worked as an actress, translator and poet, to study Egyptology.

In 1909 she performed for the first time in Munich with a program of ancient Egyptian dances, in the same vein as the famous American dancer and choreographer Ruth St. Denis, who on her tour of Europe gave a show in Berlin in 1908, although it is not known whether Sent M'ahesa witnessed it. Like the American dancer, Sent M'ahesa also extended her repertoire to other Indian, Native American, and Thai dances.

The Greek writer Nikos Kazantzakis described the show he attended in Berlin in 1923ː "I think it was one of the most beautiful pleasures of my life. She danced Indian religious dances and savage funerals. In addition, an amazing religious dance with masks".

Kurt Joos, co-founder of the Folkwang School in Essen, met Sent M'Ahesa in the winter of 1920/21 in Stuttgart, and described her dance as "archaeological".

The costumes she wore were self-made; they typically consisted of loose, North African "harem" trousers, a headdress, a draped beaded bra, and a cloak-like fabric extending down her back. She also wore stacked bracelets, shiny jewels, feathers, and large earrings. Apparently belonging to eras of the past, some items of clothing were in line with the most fashionable trends. French designer Paul Poiret produced harem pants similar to those worn by Sent M'Ahesa for upper-class women.

In many dances she did not use all the possibilities offered by the available space, but reproduced two-dimensional frontal or profile poses, her head to the side, moving sideways in front of a tapestry or a monochromatic curtain, a flattened movement that seemed to be taken "from ancient sculptural reliefs seen in the Berlin museum."

She appeared on stage with an ochre color spread all over her body; to wash herself after the performance, as there were yet no showers in the theater dressing rooms, she always traveled with her rubber bathtub.

Until the mid-1920s she enjoyed considerable fame, combining "eccentricity and exoticism".

In 1932 she unexpectedly ended her career as a dancer and moved to Sweden, her family's country of origin. She embarked on a career as a translator and worked as a journalist for the Frankfurter Allgemeine Zeitung and Atlantis magazine.

She died in Stockholm on 19 November 1970.

=== Name origin ===
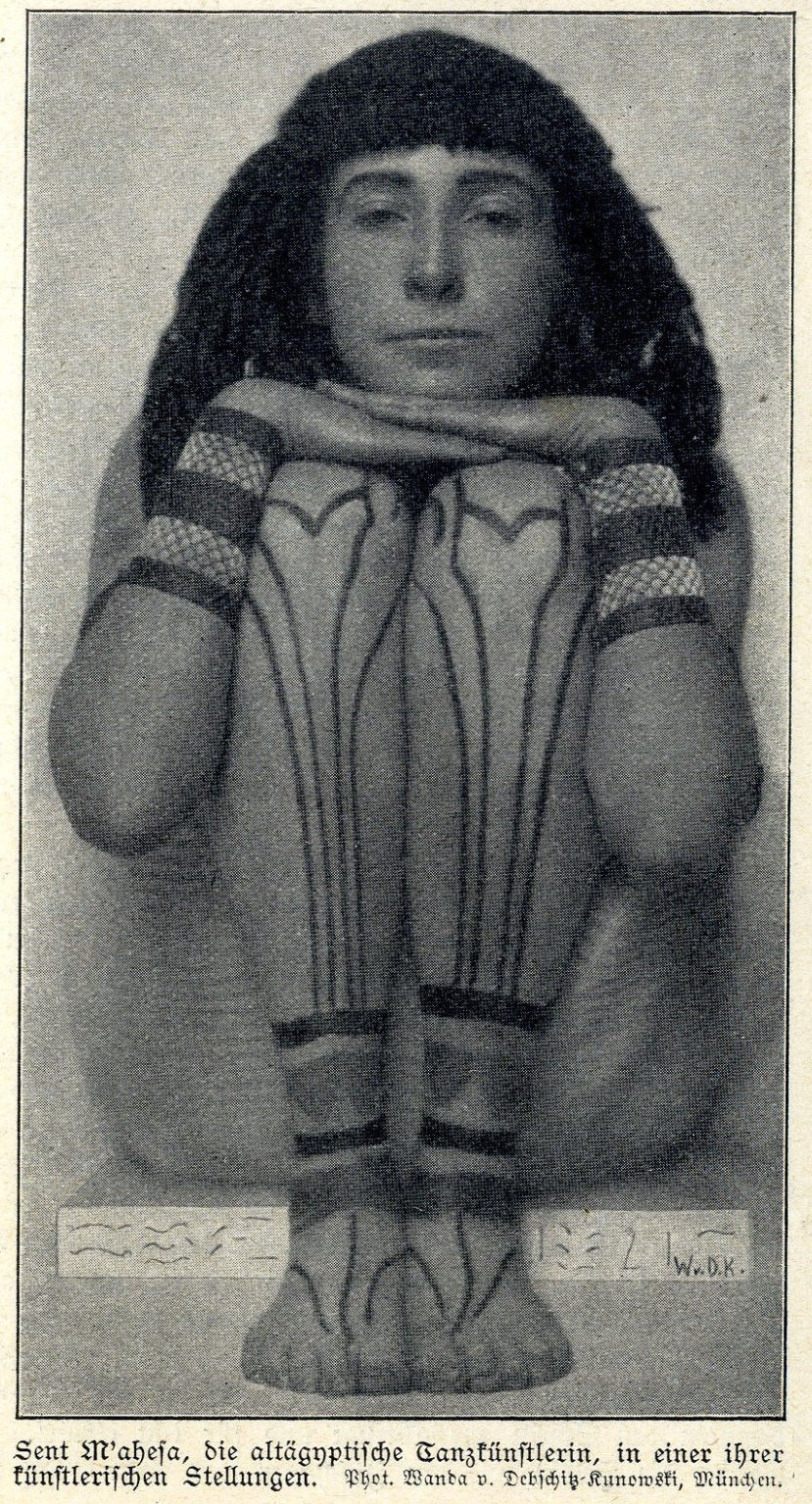

Initially it was thought that the name "Mahes" was derived from that of an Egyptian lion god, "Mahes," identified with Ra, the sun god, while "Sent" from the Egyptian "senet," meaning "sister." According to this interpretation, "Sent M'Ahesa" could be translated as "sister of the god Mahes."

Later Frank Manuel Peter of the German Dance Archive in Cologne would advance another hypothesis, based on an anecdote concerning the dancer and confirmed by an Egyptologist. The name was allegedly suggested to her, at her request, by an Egyptology professor who wanted to mock her, proposing "Sent M'Ahesa" which concealed the meaning of "stupid cow"ː "M'Ahesa" would go back to the hieroglyphic group "m hs3. t" (pronounced "em hesat") translatable as "of a cow"; "Sent" would correspond to the Germanized form of "sn.tj" (pronounced "senti"), meaning "image" or "being in the same state as," thus "image of a cow"".

=== Orientalism ===
According to Susan Funkenstein, an American scholar of art history, Sent M'ahesa represents an example of the fascination still exercised in the 1920s by the Orientalist trend, through which the Western imperialist perspective saw and treated the North African, the Middle Eastern, East and South Asia, using the tropes of exoticism and eroticism. Her dances would promote stories of colonization, both from an art history perspective, as the materials evoked by the dancer were "exhibited in museums and institutions active in the excavations of colonial lands", conveying the idea that local communities from which they had been stolen should not be considered their legitimate guardians; and because, from the point of view of the history of dance, these orientalist ballets promoted the "white dancer" as one who revived a culture, actually appropriating it and reducing it to a spectacle of otherness.

German writer Hans Brandeburg in his 1921 essay on modern dance, writing about the performances of Sent M'ahesa, noted how one could not properly speak of Egyptian dance, being in general Egyptian art "the relationship of a modern European man with this art", nor of its historical-cultural reconstruction, since there was no knowledge of Egyptian dance, and the artist was giving her own free interpretation, regardless of historical dataː Sent M'ahesa's dance represented "the relationship of Sent M'ahesa with the Egyptians", it looked more like the Egyptian sculptures, "on which this dance was made into fine art entirely in accordance with the laws of fine art." The dancer, in her opinion, had found that Egyptian costumes and masks were those that best suited her, that is, those "in which her body, gestures and face can express themselves clearly and convincingly."

== Presence in art ==
In 1917 Expressionist sculptor and painter Bernhard Hoetger dedicated to Sent M'ahesa a bronz statue similar to the bust of queen Nefertiti. She was also portrayed by Max Ernst, Max Beckmann, Bernhard Hoetger, Dietz Edzard e Adolf Munzer; some of those portraits are considered "icons of Expressionism".

Hannah Höch, in her famous photomontage, placed in the top right anti-dada quadrant the body of Sent M'Ahesa in Middle Eastern costume, juxtaposed with the head of Federal Marshal Paul von Hindenburg, the emblem of the German military effort in World War I.

== Gallery ==
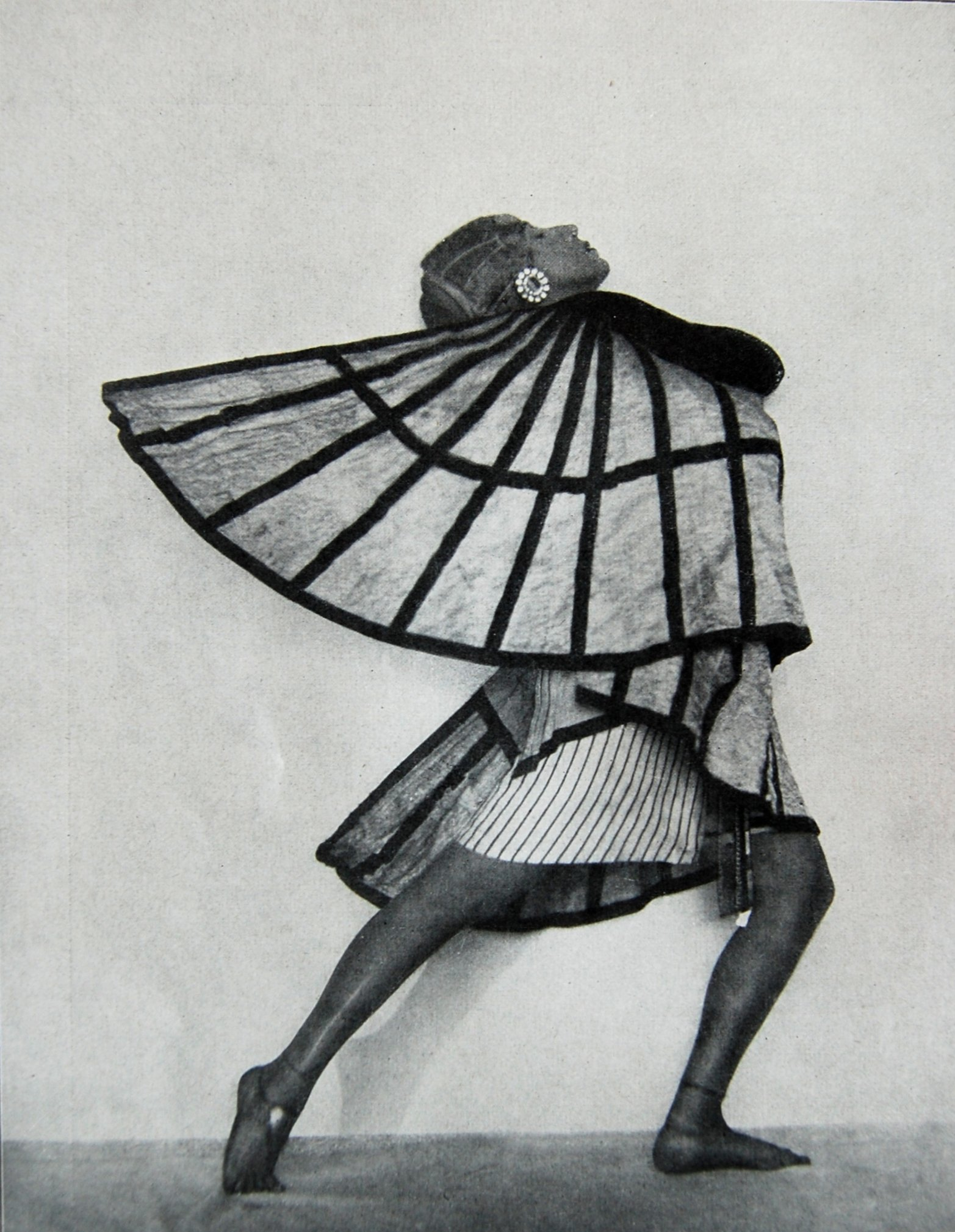
Sent M'ahesa di Hanns Holdt

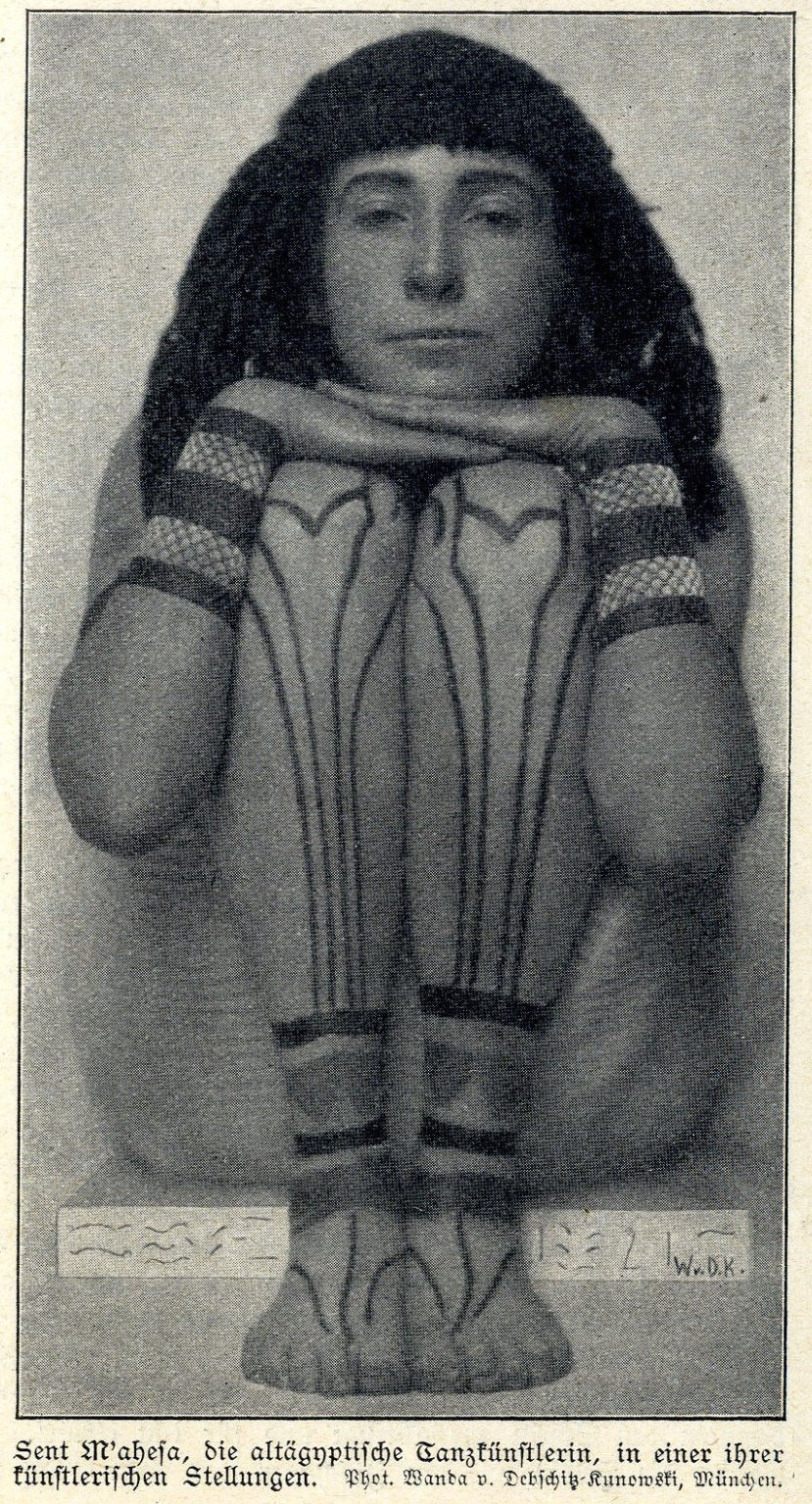
Sent M'Ahesa, Wanda von Debschitz-Kunowski, 1909

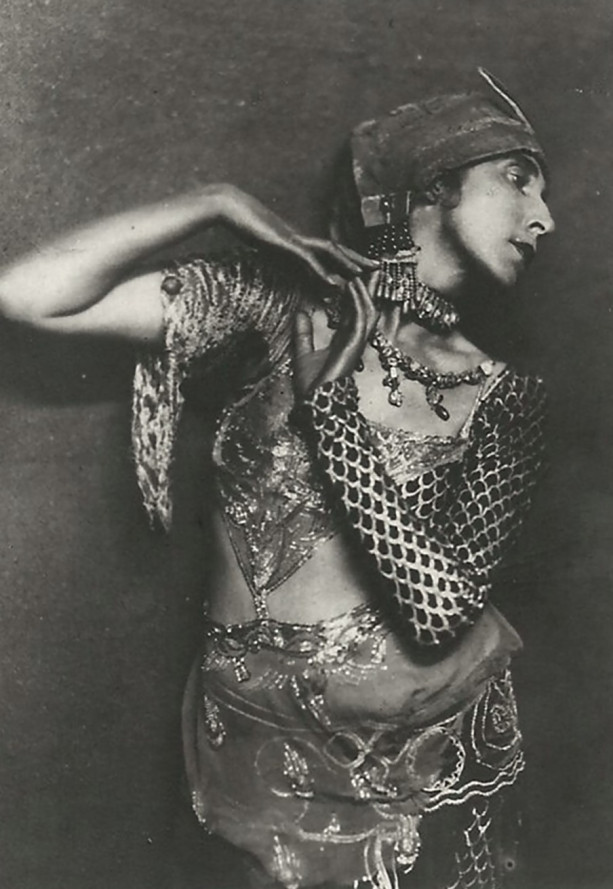
Sent M'ahesa, Hanns Holdt, 1928

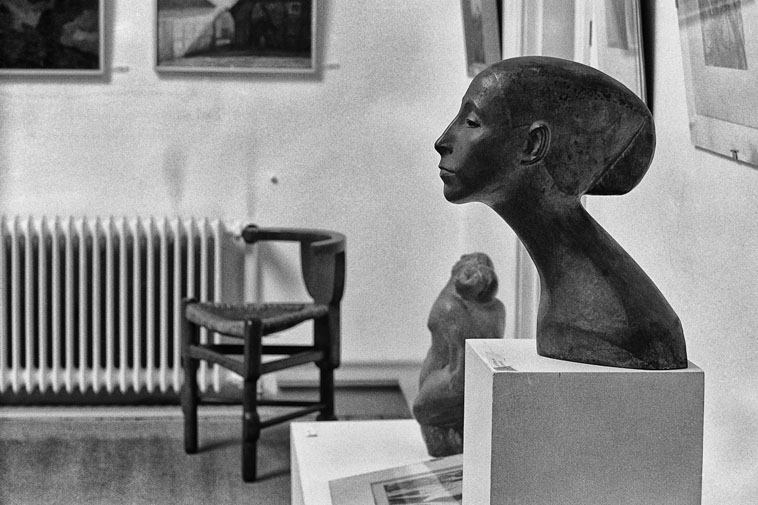
Sent M'Ahesa, Bernhard Hoetger

== Bibliography ==
- Brandenburg, Hans (1923). Der moderne Tanz (in German). München: Georg Müller. OCLC 1193383799.
- Funkenstein, Susan (2020). Marking modern movement : dance and gender in the visual imagery of the Weimar Republic. Ann Arbor: University of Michigan Press. ISBN 9780472054619.
- Lembke, Katja (2012). Hannovers Nofretete. Die Bildnisse der Sent M'Ahesa von Bernhard Hoetger (in German). Hannover: Schnell & Steiner. ISBN 978-3-7954-2627-9.
- Toepfer, Karl (1997). Empire of Ecstasy: Nudity and Movement in German Body Culture, 1910–1935. Los Angeles: University of California Press. ISBN 9780520206632.
