= Satar, Deoghar =

Satar (24.4865°N 86.6520°E) is a village in Deoghar district of Jharkhand state of India.
