= Kach Kurin =

Kach Kurin كچ كورين
- Village
- Location within Iran
- Coordinates: 27°26′51″N 60°49′00″E
- Country: Iran
- Province: Sistan and Baluchestan
- County: Iranshahr
- Bakhsh: Central
- Rural District: Damen

Population (2006)
  - Total: 106
- Time zone: UTC+3:30 (IRST)
  - Summer (DST): UTC+4:30 (IRDT)

Kach Kurin (Persian: كچ كورين, also Romanized as Kach Kūrīn; also known as Kajgūrīn and Qal‘eh-ye Tarān) is a village in Damen Rural District, in the Central District of Iranshahr County, Sistan and Baluchestan Province, Iran. At the 2006 census, its population was 106, in 23 families.
