= Kach, Pakistan =

Kach
- Location within Pakistan
- Coordinates: 30.26°N 67.19°E
- Country: Pakistan
- Province: Balochistan
- Elevation: 2,020 m (6,630 ft)
- Time zone: UTC+5 (PST)

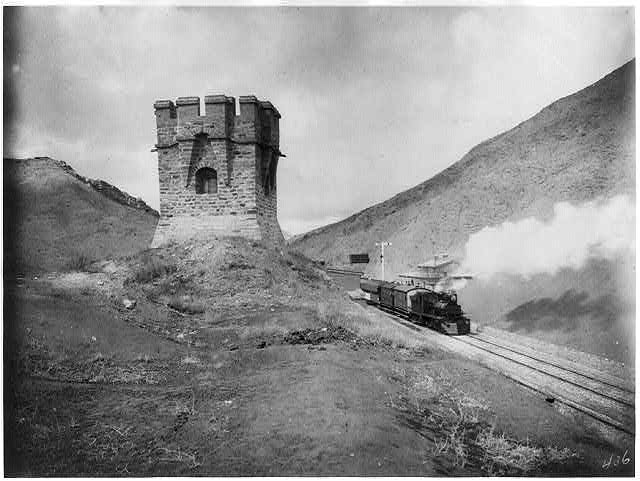
Kach Station and blockhouse near the divide between Harnai and Quetta 1895

Kach is a town and union council of the Ziarat District in the Balochistan province of Pakistan. It is located at 30°26'2N 67°19'27E and has an altitude of 2020m (6630ft).
