= Negur =

City in Sistan and Baluchestan province, Iran

Negur Persian: نگور
- City
- Location within Iran
- Coordinates: 25°23′17″N 61°08′23″E
- Country: Iran
- Province: Sistan and Baluchestan
- County: Dashtiari
- District: Central

Population (2016)
  - Total: 5,670
- Time zone: UTC+3:30 (IRST)

Negur (Persian: نگور) (Note: Also romanized as Negūr and Nīgvār; also known as Nī Kor and Nigor) is a city in the Central District of Dashtiari County, Sistan and Baluchestan province, Iran, serving as capital of both the county and the district.

== Etymology ==
Negur is a Baluchi word meaning "foothill" and is the name of many other locations in the Pakistani and Iranian parts of Baluchistan.

== Demographics ==
=== Ethnicity ===
The original inhabitants of Negur were from the Baluchi tribe of Shaikhzadah, who according to inscriptions on gravestones lived there before the invasion of the Mongolians. The existence of considerable underground water resources seems to have been the main reason for settling in Negur.

In 1969, after Negur became an independent municipality, many people including government staff migrated to the town from other parts of the country. In recent years severe drought accelerated the immigration of people from other parts of Dashtyari district, posing a serious threat to water resources. Today's population of Negur is about 8,000, mainly immigrants.

=== Population ===
At the time of the 2006 National Census, the city's population was 3,759 in 647 households, when it was capital of the former Dashtiari District of Chabahar County. The following census in 2011 counted 4,612 people in 948 households. The 2016 census measured the population of the city as 5,670 people in 1,320 households.

In 2018, the district was separated from the county in the establishment of Dashtiari County, and Negur was transferred to the new Central District as the county's capital.
