= Chil Sar, Polan =

Chil Sar چيلسر
- Village
- Location within Iran
- Coordinates: 25°39′24″N 61°04′42″E
- Country: Iran
- Province: Sistan and Baluchestan
- County: Chabahar
- Bakhsh: Polan
- Rural District: Polan

Population (2006)
  - Total: 398
- Time zone: UTC+3:30 (IRST)
  - Summer (DST): UTC+4:30 (IRDT)

Chil Sar (Persian: چيلسر, also Romanized as Chīl Sar; also known as Chehel Sar) is a village in Polan Rural District, Polan District, Chabahar County, Sistan and Baluchestan Province, Iran. At the 2006 census, its population was 398, in 52 families.
