= Pa Gach-e Lahbari =

Pa Gach-e Lahbari پاگچ لهبري
- Village
- Location within Iran
- Coordinates: 31°54′53″N 49°12′12″E
- Country: Iran
- Province: Khuzestan
- County: Masjed Soleyman
- Bakhsh: Golgir
- Rural District: Tombi Golgir

Population (2006)
  - Total: 23
- Time zone: UTC+3:30 (IRST)
  - Summer (DST): UTC+4:30 (IRDT)

Pa Gach-e Lahbari (Persian: پاگچ لهبري, also Romanized as Pā Gach-e Lahbarī; also known as Kach and Pā Gach) is a village in Tombi Golgir Rural District, Golgir District, Masjed Soleyman County, Khuzestan Province, Iran. At the 2006 census, its population was 23, in 4 families.
