= Panjshanbeh Bazar, Chabahar =

Panjshanbeh Bazar پنجشنبه بازار
- Village
- Location within Iran
- Coordinates: 25°38′57″N 60°59′16″E
- Country: Iran
- Province: Sistan and Baluchestan
- County: Chabahar
- Bakhsh: Central
- Rural District: Pir Sohrab

Population (2006)
  - Total: 213
- Time zone: UTC+3:30 (IRST)
  - Summer (DST): UTC+4:30 (IRDT)

Panjshanbeh Bazar (Persian: پنجشنبه بازار, also Romanized as Panjshanbeh Bāzār) is a village in Pir Sohrab Rural District, in the Central District of Chabahar County, Sistan and Baluchestan Province, Iran. At the 2006 census, its population was 213, in 40 families.
