= Central District (Dashtiari County) =

District in Sistan and Baluchestan province, Iran

Central District (Dashtiari County) Persian: بخش مرکزی شهرستان دشتیاری
- District
- Location within Iran
- Coordinates: 25°19′03″N 61°17′44″E
- Country: Iran
- Province: Sistan and Baluchestan
- County: Dashtiari
- Capital: Negur
- Time zone: UTC+3:30 (IRST)

The Central District of Dashtiari County (Persian: بخش مرکزی شهرستان دشتیاری) is in Sistan and Baluchestan province, Iran. Its capital is the city of Negur, whose population at the time of the 2016 National Census was 5,670 people in 1,320 households.

== History ==
After the census, the village of Beris was elevated to the status of a city. In 2018, Dashtiari District was separated from Chabahar County in the establishment of Dashtiari County, which was divided into two districts of two rural districts each, with Negur as its capital.

== Demographics ==
=== Administrative divisions ===
Central District (Dashtiari County)
Administrative Divisions
Negur RD
Sand-e Mir Suiyan RD
Beris (city) (Note: Became a city after formation of the county)
Negur (city)
RD = Rural District
