= Dashtiari County =

County in Sistan and Baluchestan province, Iran

Dashtiari County Persian: شهرستان دشتیاری
- County
- Location of Dashtiari County in Sistan and Baluchestan province (bottom right, pink)

- Location of Sistan and Baluchestan province in Iran
- Coordinates: 25°30′38″N 61°22′58″E
- Country: Iran
- Province: Sistan and Baluchestan
- Capital: Negur
- Districts: Central, Bahu Kalat

Population (2016)
  - Total: 79,911
- Time zone: UTC+3:30 (IRST)

Dashtiari County (Persian: شهرستان دشتیاری) is in Sistan and Baluchestan province, Iran. Its capital is the city of Negur, whose population at the time of the 2016 National Census was 5,670 people in 1,320 households.

== History ==
After the 2016 census, the village of Beris was elevated to the status of a city. In 2018, Dashtiari District was separated from Chabahar County in the establishment of Dashtiari County, which was divided into two districts of two rural districts each, with Negur as its capital.

== Demographics ==
=== Administrative divisions ===
Dashtiari County's administrative structure is shown in the following table.

Dashtiari County
Administrative Divisions
Central District
Negur RD
Sand-e Mir Suiyan RD
Beris (city) (Note: Became a city after formation of the county)
Negur (city)
Bahu Kalat District
Bahu Kalat RD
Darkas RD
RD = Rural District

== See also ==
Media related to Dashtiari County at Wikimedia Commons
