= Sand-e Mir Suiyan Rural District =

Rural district in Sistan and Baluchestan province, Iran

Sand-e Mir Suiyan Rural District Persian: دهستان سند میرثوبان
- Rural District
- Location within Iran
- Coordinates: 25°17′50″N 61°23′52″E
- Country: Iran
- Province: Sistan and Baluchestan
- County: Dashtiari
- District: Central
- Capital: Sand-e Mir Suiyan

Population (2016)
  - Total: 18,401
- Time zone: UTC+3:30 (IRST)

Sand-e Mir Suiyan Rural District (Persian: دهستان سند میرثوبان) is in the Central District of Dashtiari County, Sistan and Baluchestan province, Iran. Its capital is the village of Sand-e Mir Suiyan.

== Demographics ==
=== Population ===
At the time of the 2006 National Census, the rural district's population (as a part of the former Dashtiari District of Chabahar County) was 12,151 in 2,387 households. There were 17,654 inhabitants in 3,453 households at the following census of 2011. The 2016 census measured the population of the rural district as 18,401 in 3,913 households. The most populous of its 36 villages was Beris (now a city), with 4,488 people.

In 2018, the district was separated from the county in the establishment of Dashtiari County, and the rural district was transferred to the new Central District.
