= Negur Rural District =

Rural district in Sistan and Baluchestan province, Iran

Negur Rural District Persian: دهستان نگور
- Rural District
- Location within Iran
- Coordinates: 25°22′11″N 61°06′22″E
- Country: Iran
- Province: Sistan and Baluchestan
- County: Dashtiari
- District: Central
- Capital: Nowbandian-e Pain

Population (2016)
  - Total: 21,092
- Time zone: UTC+3:30 (IRST)

Negur Rural District (Persian: دهستان نگور) is in the Central District of Dashtiari County, Sistan and Baluchestan province, Iran. Its capital is the village of Nowbandian-e Pain.

== Demographics ==
=== Population ===
At the time of the 2006 National Census, the rural district's population (as a part of the former Dashtiari District of Chabahar County) was 17,425 in 3,254 households. There were 19,831 inhabitants in 4,024 households at the following census of 2011. The 2016 census measured the population of the rural district as 21,092 in 4,727 households. The most populous of its 77 villages was Kalber, with 1,280 people.

In 2018, the district was separated from the county in the establishment of Dashtiari County, and the rural district was transferred to the new Central District.
