= Bahu Kalat Rural District =

Rural district in Sistan and Baluchestan province, Iran

Bahu Kalat Rural District Persian: دهستان باهوكلات
- Rural District
- Location within Iran
- Coordinates: 25°38′22″N 61°33′16″E
- Country: Iran
- Province: Sistan and Baluchestan
- County: Dashtiari
- District: Bahu Kalat
- Capital: Dempak Bazar

Population (2016)
  - Total: 34,748
- Time zone: UTC+3:30 (IRST)

Bahu Kalat Rural District (Persian: دهستان باهوكلات) is in Bahu Kalat District of Dashtiari County, Sistan and Baluchestan province, Iran. Its capital is the village of Dempak Bazar. The previous capital of the rural district was the village of Bahu Kalat.

== Demographics ==
=== Population ===
At the time of the 2006 National Census, the rural district's population was (as a part of the former Dashtiari District of Chabahar County) was 24,478 in 4,908 households. There were 30,646 inhabitants in 6,597 households at the following census of 2011. The 2016 census measured the population of the rural district as 34,748 in 8,119 households. The most populous of its 82 villages was Darkas, with 3,959 people.

In 2018, the district was separated from the county in the establishment of Dashtiari County, and the rural district was transferred to the new Bahu Kalat District.
