= Dashtiari District =

Former district in Sistan and Baluchestan province, Iran

Dashtiari District (Chabahar County) Persian: بخش دشتیاری
- Former District
- Location within Iran
- Coordinates: 25°30′38″N 61°22′58″E
- Country: Iran
- Province: Sistan and Baluchestan
- County: Chabahar
- Capital: Negur

Population (2016)
  - Total: 79,911
- Time zone: UTC+3:30 (IRST)

Dashtiari District (Persian: بخش دشتیاری) is a former administrative division of Chabahar County, (Note: Formerly Chah Bahar County) Sistan and Baluchestan province, Iran. Its capital was the city of Negur.

== History ==
After the 2016 National Census, the district was separated from the county in the establishment of Dashtiari County.

== Demographics ==
=== Population ===
At the time of the 2006 census, the district's population was 57,813 in 11,196 households. The following census in 2011 counted 72,743 people in 15,022 households. The 2016 census measured the population of the district as 79,911 inhabitants in 18,079 households.

=== Administrative divisions ===
Dashtiari District Population
Administrative Divisions	2006	2011	2016
Bahu Kalat RD	24,478	30,646	34,748
Negur RD	17,425	19,831	21,092
Sand-e Mir Suiyan RD	12,151	17,654	18,401
Negur (city)	3,759	4,612	5,670
Total	57,813	72,743	79,911
RD = Rural District
