= NA-202 Khairpur-I =

Constituency of the National Assembly of Pakistan

- Constituency for the National Assembly of Pakistan
- Region: Khairpur and Kot Diji Tehsils of Khairpur District
- Electorate: 447,263

Current constituency
- Party: Pakistan People's Party
- Member: Nafisa Shah
- Created from: NA-215 Khairpur-I

NA-202 Khairpur-I (این اے-202، خيرپُور-1) is a constituency for the National Assembly of Pakistan, encompassing the Khairpur and Kot Diji tehsils in the Khairpur District. Historically, the seat has been a stronghold of the Pakistan People's Party (PPP).

The region has seen prominent political figures contesting the seat over the years, including Manzoor Wassan, Nawab Ali Wassan, and Nafisa Shah, all of whom have represented the PPP.

In recent elections, Nafisa Shah of the PPP has emerged as a key political figure, winning the seat in both the 2018 and 2024 general elections. Her victories signify the enduring influence of the PPP in the area, despite challenges from alliances like the Grand Democratic Alliance (GDA) and other independent candidates.

The constituency's electoral history is marked by allegations of electoral misconduct and legal challenges, as seen in the 2013 elections where Nawab Ali Wassan's victory was initially declared void due to alleged corrupt practices. However, the Supreme Court of Pakistan later reinstated Wassan.

== Assembly Segments ==
| Constituency number | Constituency | District | Current MPA | Party |
|---|---|---|---|---|
| 26 | PS-26 Khairpur-I | Khairpur District | Syed Qaim Ali Shah | PPP |
| 27 | PS-27 Khairpur-II | Khairpur District | Hallar Wassan | PPP |

== Election 2002 ==
General elections were held on 10 October 2002. Manzoor Wassan of PPP won by 62,447 votes.

General election 2002: NA-215 Khairpur-I
| Party | Candidate | Votes | % | ±% |
|---|---|---|---|---|
| PPP | Manzoor Hussain Wasan | 62,447 | 55.11 | |
| Independent | Sher Mohammad Phulpoto | 36,438 | 32.16 | |
| PML(F) | Habib Ur Rehman Shaikh | 6,319 | 5.58 | |
| MQM | Manzoor Hussain Ansari | 3,477 | 3.07 | |
| Others | Others (six candidates) | 4,638 | 4.08 | |
| Turnout | | 116,100 | 38.38 | |
| Total valid votes | | 113,319 | 97.61 | |
| Rejected ballots | | 2,781 | 2.39 | |
| Majority | | 26,009 | 22.95 | |
| Registered electors | | 302,490 | | |

== Election 2008 ==
General elections were held on 18 February 2008. Nawab Ali Wassan of PPP won by 98,782 votes.

General election 2008: NA-215 Khairpur-I
| Party | Candidate | Votes | % | ±% |
|---|---|---|---|---|
| PPP | Nawab Ali Wassan | 98,782 | 70.26 | |
| PML(F) | Syed Javed Ali Shah | 34,014 | 24.19 | |
| Others | Others (eight candidates) | 7,806 | 5.55 | |
| Turnout | | 143,729 | 38.64 | |
| Total valid votes | | 140,602 | 97.82 | |
| Rejected ballots | | 3,127 | 2.18 | |
| Majority | | 64,768 | 46.07 | |
| Registered electors | | 371,957 | | |
| PPP hold | | | | |

== Election 2013 ==
General elections were held on 11 May 2013. Nawab Ali Wassan of PPP won by 91,809 votes and became the member of National Assembly. However, this victory was declared null and void as the election Tribunal declared Wassan had used corrupt practices to secure his election and declared senior politician Ghous Ali Shah winner who had challenged electoral fraud. However, on 18 December 2014, Wassan was restored by the Supreme Court of Pakistan.

General election 2013: NA-215 Khairpur-I
| Party | Candidate | Votes | % | ±% |
|---|---|---|---|---|
| PPP | Nawab Ali Wassan | 91,809 | 53.84 | |
| PML(N) | Ghous Ali Shah | 66,481 | 38.99 | |
| Others | Others (sixteen candidates) | 12,219 | 7.17 | |
| Turnout | | 176,467 | 61.89 | |
| Total valid votes | | 170,509 | 96.62 | |
| Rejected ballots | | 5,958 | 3.38 | |
| Majority | | 25,328 | 14.85 | |
| Registered electors | | 285,128 | | |
| PPP hold | | | | |

== Election 2018 ==
General elections were held on 25 July 2018.

General election 2018: NA-208 Khairpur-I
| Party | Candidate | Votes | % | ±% |
|---|---|---|---|---|
| PPP | Nafisa Shah | 107,978 | 62.26 | |
| GDA | Ghous Ali Shah | 58,203 | 33.56 | |
| Independent | Asadullah | 4,020 | 2.32 | |
| MMA | Mir Muhammad Hanjrah | 972 | 0.56 | |
| PRHP | Qudratullah | 906 | 0.52 | |
| Independent | Syed Qaim Ali Shah | 850 | 0.49 | |
| PSP | Syed Asad Abbas Zaidi | 146 | 0.08 | |
| Independent | Veero Mal | 144 | 0.08 | |
| Independent | Syed Pervaiz Ali Shah Jeelani | 125 | 0.07 | |
| Independent | Syed Nawaz Ali Shah Alias Farukh | 84 | 0.05 | |
| Turnout | | 182,218 | 51.15 | |
| Total valid votes | | 173,428 | 95.18 | |
| Rejected ballots | | 8,790 | 4.82 | |
| Majority | | 49,775 | 28.70 | |
| Registered electors | | 356,253 | | |
| PPP hold | | | | |

== Election 2024 ==
Elections were held on 8 February 2024. Nafisa Shah won the election with 152,511 votes.

General election 2024: NA-202 Khairpur-I
| Party | Candidate | Votes | % | ±% |
|---|---|---|---|---|
| PPP | Nafisa Shah | 152,511 | 77.02 | ▲14.76 |
| GDA | Ghous Ali Shah | 30,026 | 15.16 | ▼18.40 |
| Others | Others (twelve candidates) | 15,478 | 7.82 | |
| Turnout | | 204,059 | 45.62 | ▼5.53 |
| Total valid votes | | 198,015 | 97.04 | |
| Rejected ballots | | 6,044 | 2.96 | |
| Majority | | 122,485 | 61.86 | ▲33.16 |
| Registered electors | | 447,263 | | |
| PPP hold | | | | |

== See also ==
- NA-201 Sukkur-II
- NA-203 Khairpur-II
