= Karachi Area Control Centre =

Karachi Area Control Centre (Urdu: کراچی ہوائی مرکز اختیار) is one of two Area Control Centres in Pakistan operated by the Pakistan Civil Aviation Authority and is based in Terminal 1 at Jinnah International Airport in Karachi. Karachi ACC air traffic controllers provide en route and terminal control services to aircraft in the Karachi Flight Information Region. The Karachi FIR airspace covers Pakistani airspace between the 30° North to 23° North. To the north is the Lahore FIR. To the east is the Delhi FIR. To the south is the Muscat FIR and to the west are the Tehran FIR and Kabul FIRs.

== Sectors ==
Karachi ACC if divided into 4 control sectors:

- Karachi Sector North
- Karachi Sector West
- Karachi Sector East
- Karachi Sector South (only active between 1830 and 0230 UTC)

== Services ==
Karachi ACC is equipped with Indra's Aircon 2100 radar system. and provides air traffic control services to all air traffic and its airspace. It also expedites sequencing of arrivals and departures along STARs (Standard Terminal Arrival Routes) and SIDs (Standard Instrument Departures). Certain exceptions include military airspace and lower-level airspace controlled by local airport towers and TRACONs. Karachi ACC is also part of the Bobcat Air Traffic Flow Management program, which helps to optimize traffic flow through Kabul FIR. Due to lower navigation and surveillance capabilities, and limited ATS provision capabilities, Kabul FIR often becomes very congested airspace with limited number of operating routes and flight levels. Whereas the level allocation is made by AeroThai, the primary responsibility for tactical management of level allocation rests with Karachi ACC.

== Airports ==
The Karachi ACC assumes control of the following airports:

- Controlled, IFR/IFR, IFR/VFR and VFR/VFR separation, VFR: Mode C and ATC clearance required
  - Karachi Jinnah International Airport
  - Dera Ghazi Khan International Airport
  - Quetta International Airport
  - Gwadar International Airport
  - Turbat International Airport
- Controlled, only IFR/IFR spacing
  - Hyderabad Airport
  - Jacobabad Airport
  - Moenjodaro Airport
  - Nawabshah Airport
  - Panjgur Airport
  - Sukkur Begum Nusrat Bhutto Airport
- Uncontrolled, clearances are required to enter or leave airspace.
  - Dalbandin Airport
  - Jiwani Airport
  - Kadanwari Airport
  - Khuzdar Airport
  - Ormara Airport
  - Pasni Airport
  - Sawan Airport
  - Sehwan Sharif Airport
  - Shamsi Airfield
  - Sibi Airport
  - Sindhri Airport
  - Sui Airport

== See also ==
- Lahore Area Control Center
- Airports of Pakistan
- Civil Aviation Authority
