= Pakistan Rangers Public Schools & Colleges System =

- PRPSACS
- Punjab, Sindh, Khyber Pakhtunkhwa, Balochistan, Northern Areas, Gilgit

Information
- School type: Rangers School; semi-private, preparatory
- Motto: "Read and Lead!"
- Opened: 1975
- School board: FBISE, CIE and Edexcel.
- Teaching staff: 20,974
- Years offered: 3-4 to 18-19
- Gender: Mixed with separate sections for males and females in most schools.
- Enrollment: 265,446
- Average class size: 30
- Education system: SSC, HSSC and GCE
- Classes offered: O and AS/A level, Matriculation, Intermediate
- Language: English-medium education
- Schedule: About 6 hours (7.30 am to 1.30 pm) in summer and (8.00 am to 2.00 pm) in winter
- Houses: Faith; Unity; Discipline; Tolerance
- Alumni: Rpsacian
- Regions: 18
- Branches: 217
- Website: rpsacssectt.edu.pk

Pakistan Rangers Public Schools & Colleges System (PRPSACS) is a school system operated by Pakistan Rangers. PRPSAC System operates in 18 regions across Pakistan. PRPSACS Secretariat serves as the central body, which controls the system's technical aspects. Central Punjab Region is the largest region in terms of schools and colleges. 20 PRPS&Cs (linked With PRPSACS Secretariat) are operated by Central Punjab Region.

== Branches ==
Sindh Region
| School Name | City | Districts |
|---|---|---|
| Quaid e Azam Rangers School And College, North Nazimabad | Karachi | Nazimabad District |
| Quaid e Azam Rangers School And College Toll Plaza Karachi | Karachi | Malir District |
| Quaid e Azam Rangers School And College Hyderabad | Hyderabad | Hyderabad District |
| Quaid-e-Azam Rangers School & College Sukkur | Sukkur | Sukkur District |
| Quaid-e-Azam Rangers School & College Larkana | Larkana | Larkana District |
| Quaid-e-Azam Rangers School & College, Nawabshah | Benazirabad | Shaheed Benazirabad District |
| Quaid-e-Azam Rangers School & College, Jamshoro | Jamshoro | Jamshoro District |
| Quaid-e-Azam Rangers Public School & College Choondiko | ChoondikoNara | Khairpur District |
| Quaid e Azam Rangers School & College Umerkot | Umerkot | Umerkot District |
| Quaid Azam Rangers Public school & College Khipro | Khipro | Sanghar District |
| Quaid e Azam Rangers Public School & College, Diplo | Diplo Tehsil | Tharparkar District |
| Quaid e Azam Rangers Public School Hathango | Hathango | Sanghar District |
| M. Alam Rangers Primary School Pir Ibbu | Pir Ibbu Village Nara Tehsil (near Head Jamrao) | Khairpur District |
