= Choondiko =

- city
- چونڊڪو
- Location within Sindh Location within Pakistan
- Coordinates: 27.00°N 68.86°E
- Country: Pakistan
- Province: Sindh
- District: Khairpur
- Tehsil: Nara

Government
  - DSP: DSP Nara
- Elevation: 45 m (148 ft)

Population (2023)
  - Total: 40,305
- Time zone: UTC+5 (PST)
- Calling code: 0243
- Number of union councils: 08

Choondiko City is the administrative headquarters of Nara Tehsil within the Khairpur District of Sindh province, Pakistan. Located approximately 56 kilometers from the city of Khairpur, Choondiko serves as a vital center for the surrounding rural communities.

== History and significance ==
While the exact date of Choondiko's establishment remains unclear, historical records suggest its existence predates the British Raj in the region. The city likely developed as a trading post and agricultural hub due to its strategic location along the Nara Canal. Following the creation of Nara Tehsil in the 20th century, Choondiko was designated as its administrative headquarters, solidifying its importance in the regional governance structure.
