= Austria–Pakistan relations =

- Pakistan: Austria

Bilateral relations exist between Austria and Pakistan. Pakistan maintains an embassy in Vienna, where the current Ambassador of Pakistan to Austria is Mohammad Kamran Akhtar MALIK. Austria also has an embassy in Islamabad, where the current Ambassador of Austria to Pakistan and Afghanistan is Andrea Wicke.

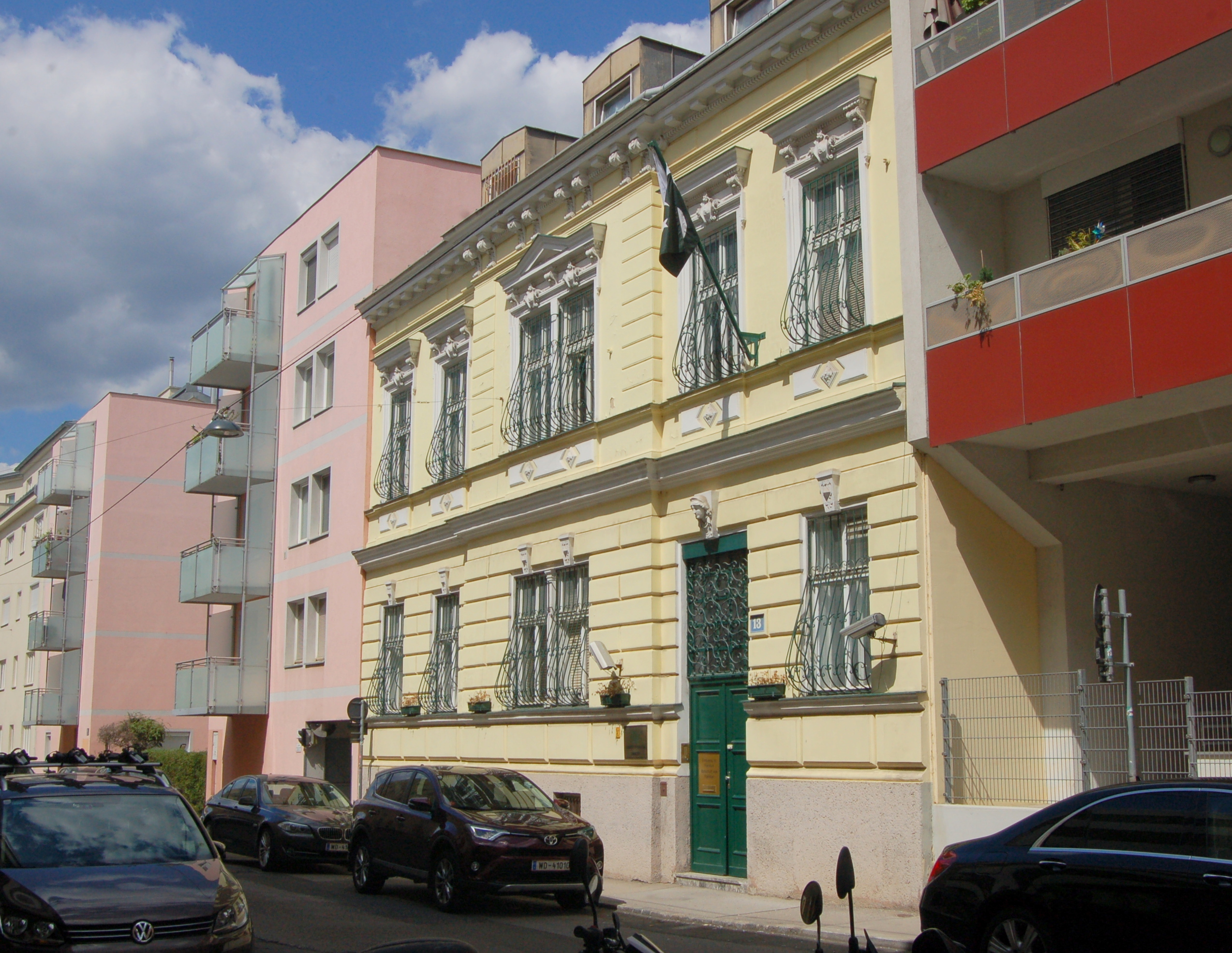
Embassy of Pakistan in Vienna

== Agreements ==
Pakistan and Austria have between them a number of agreements which include:

- Air Services Agreement (however there are currently no direct flights between the two countries)
- Extradition Treaty
- Agreement for visa abolition for diplomatic and official passport holders
- Double Tax Avoidance Agreement
- Several Memorandums of Understanding on educational cooperation

Under the aforementioned Memorandums of Understanding, the Higher Education Commission of Pakistan has sent Pakistani scholars to Austria for doctoral and/or post-doctoral level studies. A Joint Working Group on Trade and Economic Cooperation has been established in 1994 with sessions taking place alternatively in Islamabad and Vienna every three to four years.

== Economic relations ==
Pakistan's major exports to Austria have traditionally been cotton and related products, as well as leather products, carpets, clothing and sporting equipment.

Austrian companies have invested in Pakistani hydro power and alternative energy development projects. Several Austrian companies are already working in the energy sector in Pakistan.

VA Tech International has helped modernize steel production facilities in Karachi. OMV Pakistan is a joint venture of Austrian OMV and various Pakistani oil and gas companies. Together they have invested millions in the Sawan Gas Field and Kadanwari Gas Field in interior Sindh and are the largest foreign investors in the gas production and exploration sector.

== Cultural relations ==
The Austro-Pakistan Society was founded in 1976 with a view to cultivating the cultural and scientific contacts of Austria with Pakistan. The main sponsors of the society are OMV as well as Bank Austria and Emirates.

== Resident diplomatic missions ==
- Austria has an embassy in Islamabad.
- Pakistan has an embassy in Vienna.

== See also ==
- Foreign relations of Austria
- Foreign relations of Pakistan
