= Jado Wahan =

Agricultural zone in Gambat District, Khairpur Mirs, Sindh, Pakistan

Jado Wahan (Urdu: جادو واهن) (Sindhi: جادو واهڻ) is the Union Council of Taluka Gambat District, Khairpur Mirs, Sindh, Pakistan. It is an agricultural zone.

It is linked with taluka headquarter city Gambat with Gambat-Agra road and it is also connected with Larkana-Khairpur bypass with a same Gambat-Agra road. The farmland around the area is irrigated by Hameerji canal.

There are large orchard of date palms, mangoes, lemon, olive and some of cherries orchards. In domestic animals peoples keep buffalos, cows, goats, sheep, poultry and dogs. There is a government public health care center.
