= Hallar Wassan =

Member of the Provincial Assembly of Sindh from Khairpur (2024–2029)

- هالار منظور وساڻ

Member of the Provincial Assembly of Sindh
- Incumbent
- Assumed office 25 February 2024
- Constituency: PS-27 Khairpur-II

Personal details
- Party: PPP (2024-present)
- Parent: Manzoor Wassan (father)

Hallar Manzoor Wassan (Sindhi: هالار منظور وساڻ; Urdu: ھالار منظور وسان), also known as Hallar Khan Wassan, is a Pakistani politician who is member of the Provincial Assembly of Sindh.

== Early life and education ==
He was born on 12 December 1994 in Khairpur, Pakistan. He holds a L.L.B. Honours from the University of Westminster.

== Political career ==
He was elected to the 16th Provincial Assembly of Sindh as a candidate of the Pakistan People's Party (PPP) from constituency PS-27 Khairpur-II in the 2024 Pakistani general election. He received 91,131 votes while runner up Muhammad Shareef Burro of Jamiat Ulema-e-Islam (F) received 10,734 votes.
