= Pir Abdul Qadir Shah Jeelani Institute of Medical Sciences =

Pakistani hospital and medical university

Gambat Institute of Medical Sciences
- Type: Medical school
- Established: 2006
- Affiliations: Shaheed Mohtarma Benazir Bhutto Medical University
- Location: Gambat, Pakistan

Pir Abdul Qadir Shah Jeelani Institute of Medical Sciences also known as Gambat Institute of Medical Sciences, is a medical college located in Gambat, Khairpur District, Sindh, Pakistan. It was established in 2012 and is affiliated with the Shaheed Mohtarma Benazir Bhutto Medical University in Larkana, Sindh. The college offers undergraduate programs in medicine and surgery, as well as postgraduate programs in various specialties, including internal medicine, pediatrics, and obstetrics and gynecology.

GIMS successfully completed its inaugural bone marrow transplant in the 2021.
