= Faiz Ganj Tehsil =

(فیض گنج) پکاچانک
- Tehsil
- Pacca chang (Faiz Ganj)
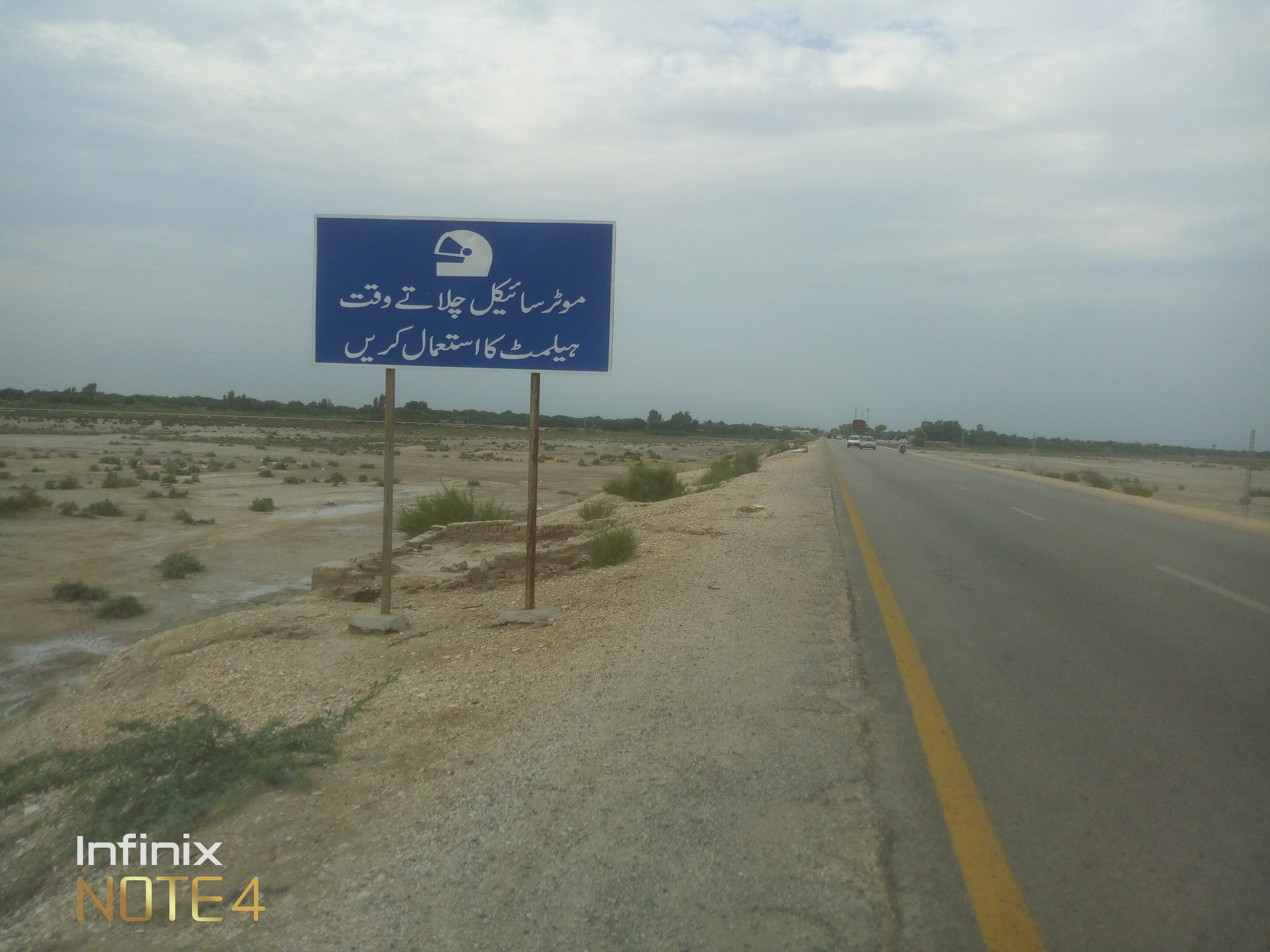
- Country: Pakistan
- Province: Sindh
- District: Khairpur District
- Headquarter: Pacca Chang

Government
  - MPA PS-29: Shiraz Shaukat rajper
  - Chairman: Syed Jiyal Shah Jeelani

Population (2023)
  - Total: 38,385
- Time zone: UTC+5 (PST)
- Number of towns: 1

Faiz Ganj Tehsil (Sindhi: فیز گنج) is an administrative subdivision (tehsil) of Khairpur District in the Sindh province of Pakistan. It is administratively subdivided into 22 Union Councils, and 2 Town Committees, One Town Committee Pacca Chang, having 9 wards and other Town Committee Karoondi, there are 3 wards in TC Karoondi, Administrative Headquarter of Tahsil Faiz Ganj is Pacca Chang.

Pacca Chang town is 74 km from Nawabshah city, the 5th largest city of Sindh, and 89 km from Khairpur city, the district capital.

Faiz Ganj Tehsil's capital Pacca Chang city, with a population of 38385, is situated on Mehran Highway, 74 km from Nawabshah city, the 5th largest city of Sindh, and 89 km from Khairpur city, the district capital.

== Town Council ==
The population development of Pacca Chang as well as related information and services (weather, Wikipedia, Google, images).

=== Further information about the population structure ===
Gender	Persons
Males	19,436
Females	18,947
Transgender	2

Gender (C 2023)
Males	19,436
Females	18,947
Transgender	2

Name	District	Population Census 1972-09-16	Population Census 1981-03-01	Population Census 1998-03-01	Population Census 2017-03-15	Population Census 2023-03-01
Pacca Chang	Khairpur	...	...	8,506	32,968	38,385
Pacca Chang 38,385 Population [2023] – Census 2.6% Annual Population Change [2017 → 2023]

Source: Pakistan Bureau of Statistics.
