= PS-27 Khairpur-II =

Constituency of the Provincial Assembly of Sindh, Pakistan

- Constituency for the Provincial Assembly of Sindh
- Region: Khairpur Tehsil (partly) and Kot Diji Taluka (partly) including Kot Diji city of Khairpur District
- Electorate: 226,434

Current constituency
- Member: Vacant
- Created from: PS-32 Khairpur-IV

PS-27 Khairpur-II (پی ایس-27، خیرپور-2) is a constituency of the Provincial Assembly of Sindh.

== General elections 2024 ==
Provincial election 2024: PS-27 Khairpur-II
Party	Candidate	Votes	%	±%
PPP	Hallar Wassan	93,337	87.20	
JUI (F)	Muhammad Sharif Buriro	10,734	10.03	
Others	Others (nine candidates)	2,972	2.77	
Turnout		109,443	48.33	
Total valid votes		107,043	97.81	
Rejected ballots		2,400	2.19	
Majority		82,603	77.17	
Registered electors		226,434		

== General elections 2018 ==
Contesting candidates	Party affiliation	Votes polled

== General elections 2013 ==
Contesting candidates	Party affiliation	Votes polled

== General elections 2008 ==
Contesting candidates	Party affiliation	Votes polled

== See also ==
- PS-26 Khairpur-I
- PS-28 Khairpur-III
