= Fareedabad =

Village in Sindh, Pakistan

Coordinates: 27°27′29.23″N 68°13′47.74″E

Fareedabad (فريدآباد) also spelt Faridabad, is a village located in the Khairpur District in the Sindh province of Pakistan.
