= Nawab Ali Wassan =

Pakistani politician

Member of the National Assembly of Pakistan
- In office 2008 – 31 May 2018
- Constituency: NA-215 (Khairpur-I)

Personal details
- Born: 1 August 1974 (age 51) Khairpur, Pakistan
- Party: Pakistan Peoples Party

Nawab Ali Wassan (Urdu: نواب علی وسان; born 1 August 1974) is a Pakistani politician who had been a member of the National Assembly of Pakistan, from 2008 to May 2018.

== Early life ==
He was born on 1 August 1974 in Khairpur, Pakistan.

== Political career ==
He was elected to the National Assembly of Pakistan as a candidate of Pakistan Peoples Party (PPP) from Constituency NA-215 (Khairpur-I) in the 2008 Pakistani general election. He received 98,782 votes and defeated Syed Javed Ali Shah Jillani, a candidate of Pakistan Muslim League (F) (PML-F).

He was re-elected to the National Assembly as a candidate of PPP from Constituency NA-215 (Khairpur-I) in the 2013 Pakistani general election. He received 91,809 votes and defeated Ghous Ali Shah.
