= PS-26 Khairpur-I =

Constituency of the Provincial Assembly of Sindh, Pakistan

- Constituency for the Provincial Assembly of Sindh
- Region: Khairpur Tehsil (partly) including Khairpur city of Khairpur District
- Electorate: 220,829

Current constituency
- Member: Syed Qaim Ali Shah
- Created from: PS-29 Khairpur-I

PS-26 Khairpur-I (پی ایس-26، خیرپور-1) is a constituency of the Provincial Assembly of Sindh.

== General elections 2024 ==
Provincial election 2024: PS-26 Khairpur-I
Party	Candidate	Votes	%	±%
PPP	Syed Qaim Ali Shah	63,686	68.06	
GDA	Imam Bux Phulpoto	19,041	20.35	
PTI	Noor Hussain Sakhani (Note: Filed nomination papers as PTI candidate but ECP allowed him to run as an Independent)	3,581	3.83	
Independent	Shahnaz Shaikh	2,546	2.72	
PRHP	Altaf Hussain Solangi	1,787	1.91	
Others	Others (seventeen candidates)	2,930	3.13	
Turnout		97,053	43.95	
Total valid votes		93,571	96.41	
Rejected ballots		3,482	3.59	
Majority		44,645	47.71	
Registered electors		220,829		

== General elections 2018 ==
Contesting candidates	Party affiliation	Votes polled

== General elections 2013 ==
Contesting candidates	Party affiliation	Votes polled

== General elections 2008 ==
Contesting candidates	Party affiliation	Votes polled

== See also ==
- PS-25 Sukkur-IV
- PS-27 Khairpur-II
