= Jalaluddin Shar =

Village in Pakistan

Jalaluddin Shar is a small village located in Taluka Faiz Ganj of Khairpur district, Sindh province, Pakistan. It is located near the town Bhangu Behan.
