= United Energy Pakistan =

Oil and gas company in Pakistan

- Formerly: Union Texas Pakistan (1977–2000); BP Pakistan (2000–2011)
- Type: Subsidiary
- Industry: Oil and gas
- Headquarters: Karachi, Pakistan
- Area served: Pakistan
- Key people: Zaheer Alam (President)
- Products: Natural gas Crude oil Liquefied petroleum gas
- Parent: United Energy Group
- Subsidiaries: Asia Resources Oil Limited; BowEnergy Resources (Pakistan) SRL; United Energy Pakistan Holdings Limited; United Energy Pakistan Limited
- Website: uep.com.pk

United Energy Pakistan Limited (UEP), formerly known as BP Pakistan, and Union Texas Pakistan, is a Pakistani oil and gas company based in Karachi. It is a subsidiary of Chinese United Energy Group in Pakistan with a footprint in Sindh province of Pakistan, around 100 km to the east of Karachi.

== History ==
=== 1977–2000: Union Texas Pakistan ===
On April 20, 1977, the government of Pakistan granted Union Texas Petroleum, then a division of Allied Chemical, a concession of about 6,900 square miles (17,900 km^{2}) for oil and gas exploration in the Hyderabad, Tharparkar, and Thatta districts of Sindh. Union Texas operated the Badin concession for a group that included Cities Service and the state-owned Oil and Gas Development Corporation (OGDC). The group's Khaskeli-1 well reached its total depth on June 16, 1981, making the first oil discovery in the Lower Indus Basin, and the Khaskeli field began production in February 1982.

Union Texas went on to discover the Laghari oil field at the end of 1983, the Golarchi gas field in January 1984 and the Tajedi oil field in May 1984. In Laghari, the government held 40 percent, and Union Texas and Cities Service held 30 percent each. A fourth oil discovery, at Dabhi, was announced in October 1984. By 1985, Occidental Petroleum and Union Texas each held 30 percent of the Badin block, with OGDC holding the rest. In February 1988, the start of production at South Mazari, the fifth producing field, raised Badin's output to 18,500 barrels per day. That December, a cargo of Badin crude shipped to Singapore became Pakistan's first oil export. Gas sales to Sui Southern Gas Company began in March 1989.

In 1992, the government awarded the Union Texas group the adjoining Badin II concession of about 2,631 square miles (6,810 km^{2}). By early 1993, the group had made 29 oil and gas discoveries, and 11 producing fields were yielding about 18,000 barrels of oil and 137 million cubic feet of gas a day. Union Texas had also spent about Rs 24 million on social projects in Badin, such as schools and hospitals, and employed more than 400 local residents. By April 1997, the group had drilled 104 exploratory wells on the Badin block and made 47 discoveries. It was producing from 42 fields, much of it from sandstones of the Lower Goru Formation, and in 1996 Badin supplied about 24,000 of Pakistan's 58,216 barrels per day of oil. On November 12, 1997, four American employees of Union Texas and their Pakistani driver were shot dead in Karachi.

Union Texas Petroleum traced its origins to Union Texas Natural Gas, which was formed through a merger in 1960 and acquired by Allied Chemical in 1962. Allied sold a majority stake in a 1985 leveraged buyout, making Union Texas an independent company. In June 1998, the Atlantic Richfield Company (ARCO) bought Union Texas for about US$2.5 billion, gaining its interests in three Badin concessions. BP Amoco completed its takeover of ARCO in April 2000, and by November 2000 Union Texas Pakistan was a BP Amoco subsidiary.

=== 2000–2011: BP Pakistan ===
Under BP, Union Texas Pakistan became BP Pakistan. In November 2000, a group that included the company and Occidental was awarded the onshore Mehran block. In 2001, BP acquired an interest in the Mirpur Khas and Khipro blocks, which had been awarded to Orient Petroleum in 1999 and began producing in 2003. In July 2006, BP Pakistan, which then produced 22 percent of Pakistan's oil and 6 percent of its gas, was awarded three offshore exploration blocks covering 21,000 km^{2}. In 2007, BP took over Occidental's Pakistani interests, including a 42 percent interest in Badin, in exchange for its West Texas pipeline system and other US assets.

After the Deepwater Horizon oil spill, BP announced in July 2010 that it would sell its Pakistani upstream assets as part of a worldwide asset sale to help pay for the spill. On December 14, 2010, BP agreed to sell all of its Pakistani exploration and production business to United Energy Group for US$775 million in cash. The deal comprised nine onshore blocks in Sindh, both producing and exploratory, and four offshore exploration blocks in the Arabian Sea, held by BP Pakistan Exploration and Production, BP Pakistan (Badin) and BP Exploration Alpha. BP Pakistan's net production was then about 35,000 barrels of oil equivalent per day. Federal Board of Revenue asked for the payment to be made in Pakistan because of tax liabilities. United Energy Group financed the purchase with a US$640 million loan facility from China Development Bank and completed it in September 2011, renaming the business United Energy Pakistan.

=== 2011–present: United Energy Pakistan ===
In 2012, UEP secured a credit line of $5 billion from China Development Bank for its Pakistani operations and other potential acquisitions.

In March 2018, UEP acquired OMV's gas fields in Pakistan for US$192 million. Previously, OMV had acquired Petronas' gas fields in Pakistan when it decided to exit Pakistan in 2010.

In 2019, United Energy Pakistan was the largest foreign oil and gas exploration and production company in Pakistan, and remained 9th on the list with exports worth $227 million.

== Gas fields ==
UEP gas fields cover Badin, Tando Muhammad Khan, Tando Allahyar, Thatta, Hyderabad (rural), Matiari, Sanghar, Mirpur Khas and Khairpur of the Sindh province. Currently, there are active production and exploration blocks in Sindh province and four offshore exploration blocks in the Arabian Sea. The company also won bids for two new exploration blocks, Digri and Sanghar South, which lie adjacent to UEP's Mirpur Khas Khipro concession areas.
