= Minister of Defence (Pakistan) =

List of Defence Ministers of Pakistan

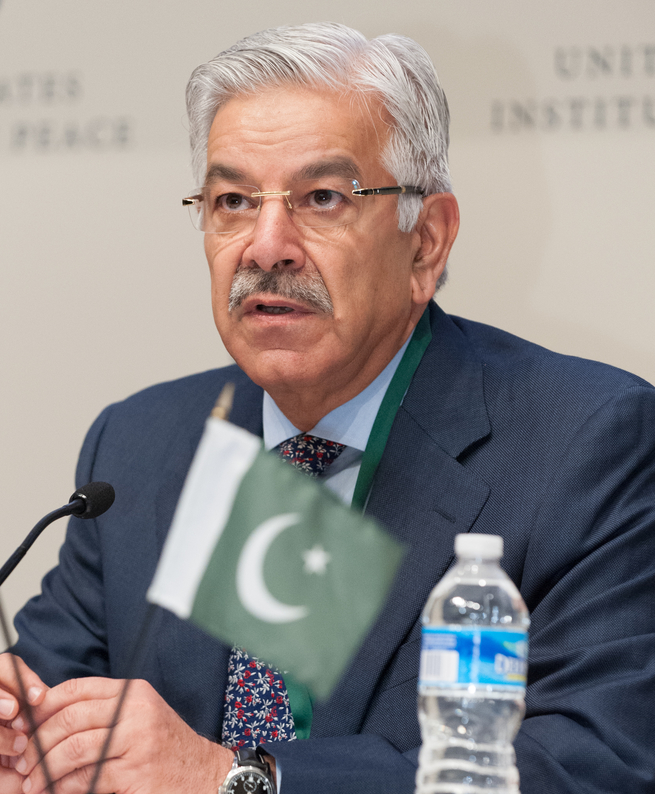
- Incumbent; Khawaja Asif since 11 March 2024
- Ministry of Defence
- Member of: Cabinet
- Reports to: Prime Minister of Pakistan; Parliament of Pakistan
- Seat: Calcutta House, Murree Road Rawalpindi, Punjab, Pakistan. 46000
- Nominator: Prime minister of Pakistan
- Appointer: President of Pakistan
- First holder: Liaquat Ali Khan
- Website: mod.gov.pk

The Minister of Defence (Urdu: 'وزیرِ دفاع') heads the federal Ministry of Defence in Pakistan. The minister serves in the cabinet of the Prime Minister and is required to be a member of Parliament.

In the history of the country, the defence portfolio has often been headed by the head of the government, including the President or Prime Minister of the country. The country's first defence minister was Liaquat Ali Khan.

== List of ministers ==
Legend

- Caretaker minister
- ^{†} Died in office

Portrait	Name (Born–Died)	Tenure			Party	Government	Head of Government
Portrait	Name (Born–Died)	From	To	Length	Party	Government	Head of Government
Federal Minister of Defence
	Liaquat Ali Khan (1947–1951); MCA for East Bengal (Prime Minister)	15 August 1947	16 October 1951^{[†]}	4 years, 62 days	Muslim League	Liaquat	Self
	Sir Khawaja Nazimuddin (1894–1964); MCA for East Bengal (Prime Minister)	24 October 1951	17 April 1953	1 year, 175 days	Muslim League	Nazimuddin	Self
	Mohammad Ali Bogra (1909–1963); MCA for East Bengal (Prime Minister)	18 April 1953	24 October 1954	1 year, 189 days	Muslim League	Bogra	Mohammad Ali Bogra
	General; Ayub Khan (1907–1974); Commander-in-Chief, Pakistan Army	24 October 1954	11 August 1955	291 days	Muslim League	Bogra	Mohammad Ali Bogra
	Chaudhry Muhammad Ali (1905–1982)	12 August 1955	12 September 1956	1 year, 31 days	Muslim League	Muhammad Ali	Self
	Huseyn Shaheed Suhrawardy (1892–1963)	13 September 1956	18 October 1957	1 year, 35 days	Awami League	Suhrawardy	Self
	Mumtaz Daultana (1916–1965)	19 October 1957	18 December 1957	60 days	Muslim League	Chundrigar	I. I. Chundrigar
Federal Minister		19 December 1957	8 April 1958	110 days	Republican Party	Noon	Sir Feroz Khan Noon
	Sir Feroz Khan Noon (1893–1970); MCA for Punjab (Prime Minister)	19 December 1957	8 April 1958	110 days	Republican Party	Noon	Sir Feroz Khan Noon
Minister of State		19 December 1957	8 April 1958	110 days	Republican Party	Noon	Sir Feroz Khan Noon
	Akbar Bugti (1926–2006)	19 December 1957	8 April 1958	110 days	Republican Party	Noon	Sir Feroz Khan Noon
Federal Minister of Defence
	Muhammad Ayub Khuhro (1901–1980)	9 April 1958	7 October 1958	181 days	Muslim League	Noon	Sir Feroz Khan Noon
	Field Marshal; Ayub Khan (1907–1974) (President)	28 October 1958	21 October 1966	7 years, 358 days	Muslim League	Ayub	Ayub Khan (President)
	Field Marshal; Ayub Khan (1907–1974) (President)	28 October 1958	21 October 1966	7 years, 358 days	Convention Muslim League	Ayub	Ayub Khan (President)
	Vice Admiral; A. R. Khan (1921–1983)	12 October 1966	5 April 1969	2 years, 175 days	Military (Non-partisan)	Ayub	Ayub Khan (President)
	General; Yahya Khan (1917–1980) (Chief Martial Law Administrator)	25 March 1969	20 December 1971	2 years, 270 days	Military (Non-partisan)	Yahya	Self (President)
	Zulfikar Ali Bhutto (1928–1979)	20 December 1971	5 July 1977	5 years, 197 days	Pakistan People's Party	Bhutto	Self (Note: Served as President from 1971 to 1973 and Prime Minister from 1973 to 1977)
	General; Zia-ul-Haq (1924–1988)	5 July 1977	27 Aug 1978	1 year, 53 days	Military (Non-partisan)	Haq	Zia-ul-Haq (President)
	Ali Ahmad Talpur (1915–1987)	27 August 1978	25 February 1985	6 years, 182 days	Independent	Haq	Zia-ul-Haq (President)
	General; Zia-ul-Haq (1924–1988)	27 February 1985	24 March 1985	25 days	Military (Non-partisan)	Haq	Zia-ul-Haq (President)
	Muhammad Junejo (1932–1993) (Prime Minister)	25 March 1985	29 May 1988	3 years, 65 days	Independent	Haq	Zia-ul-Haq (President)
	Mahmoud Haroon (1920–2008)	9 June 1988	17 August 1988	176 days	Independent	Haq	Zia-ul-Haq (President)
	Mahmoud Haroon (1920–2008)	17 August 1988	2 December 1988	176 days	Independent	Ishaq Khan	Ghulam Ishaq Khan (Acting President)
	Benazir Bhutto (1953–2007)	4 December 1988	6 August 1990	1 year, 245 days	Pakistan People's Party	Bhutto I	Self
Caretaker ministry served during this interval
	Nawaz Sharif (born 1949)	6 November 1990	10 September 1991	308 days	Muslim League (IJI)	Nawaz I	Self
	Ghous Ali Shah (born 1934)	10 September 1991	18 April 1993	1 year, 220 days	Muslim League (IJI)	Nawaz I	Self
	Hazar Khan Bijarani (1946–2018) (Caretaker)	18 April 1993	26 May 1993	38 days	Independent (Caretaker)	Mazari	Balakh Sher Mazari (Caretaker)
	Ghous Ali Shah (born 1934)	26 May 1993	18 July 1993	53 days	Pakistan Muslim League (N) (IJI)	Nawaz I	Nawaz Sharif
	Lieutenant General (Retd); Rehm Dil Bhatti (Caretaker)	23 July 1993	19 October 1993	88 days	Independent (Caretaker)	Qureshi	Moeenuddin Ahmad Qureshi (Caretaker)
	Aftab Shaban Mirani (1940–2025)	19 October 1993	5 November 1996	3 years, 17 days	Pakistan People's Party	Bhutto II	Benazir Bhutto
	Shahid Hamid (Caretaker)	11 November 1996	17 February 1997	98 days	Independent (Caretaker)	Khalid	Malik Meraj Khalid (Caretaker)
	Nawaz Sharif (born 1949)	17 February 1997	12 October 1999	2 years, 237 days	Pakistan Muslim League (N)	Nawaz II	Self
	General; Pervez Musharraf (1943–2023) (Chief Executive)	12 October 1999	23 November 2002	3 years, 42 days	Military (Non-partisan)	Musharraf	Self (Chief Executive)
	Rao Sikandar Iqbal (1943–2010)	23 November 2002	15 November 2007	4 years, 357 days	Pakistan Peoples Party Parliamentarians	Jamali	Zafarullah Khan Jamali
	Rao Sikandar Iqbal (1943–2010)	23 November 2002	15 November 2007	4 years, 357 days	Pakistan Peoples Party Parliamentarians	Hussain	Shujaat Hussain
	Rao Sikandar Iqbal (1943–2010)	23 November 2002	15 November 2007	4 years, 357 days	Pakistan Peoples Party Parliamentarians	Aziz	Shaukat Aziz
	Salim Abbas Jilani (Caretaker)	15 November 2007	24 March 2008	130 days	Independent (Caretaker)	Soomro	Muhammad Mian Soomro (Caretaker)
	Ahmad Mukhtar (1946–2020)	31 March 2008	3 June 2012	4 years, 64 days	Pakistan People's Party	Gillani	Yousaf Raza Gillani
	Naveed Qamar (born 1955)	4 June 2012	16 March 2013	285 days	Pakistan People's Party	Ashraf	Raja Pervaiz Ashraf
	Mir Hazar Khan Khosa (1929–2021)	4 April 2013	4 June 2013	61 days	Independent (Caretaker)	Khoso	Self (Caretaker)
	Nawaz Sharif (born 1949)	7 June 2013	26 November 2013	172 days	Pakistan Muslim League (N)	Nawaz III	Nawaz Sharif
	Khawaja Asif (born 1949)	27 November 2013	28 July 2017	3 years, 243 days	Pakistan Muslim League (N)	Nawaz III	Nawaz Sharif
	Khurram Dastgir (born 1970)	4 August 2017	31 May 2018	300 days	Pakistan Muslim League (N)	Abbasi	Shahid Khaqan Abbasi
	Abdullah Hussain Haroon (born 1950) (Caretaker)	5 June 2018	18 August 2018	74 days	Independent (Caretaker)	Mulk	Nasirul Mulk (Caretaker)
	Imran Khan (born 1952)	18 August 2018	20 August 2018	3 days	Pakistan Tehreek-e-Insaf	Imran Khan government	Self
	Pervez Khattak (born 1950)	20 August 2018	10 April 2022	3 years, 233 days	Pakistan Tehreek-e-Insaf	Imran	Imran Khan
	Khawaja Asif (born 1949)	19 April 2022	10 August 2023	1 year, 113 days	Pakistan Muslim League (N)	Shehbaz I	Shehbaz Sharif
	Lieutenant General (Retd); Anwar Ali Hyder (Caretaker)	17 August 2023	4 March 2024	200 days	Independent (Caretaker)	Kakar	Anwaar ul Haq Kakar (Caretaker)
	Khawaja Asif (born 1949)	11 March 2024	Incumbent	2 years, 233 days	Pakistan Muslim League (N)	Shehbaz II	Shehbaz Sharif

== See also ==
- Constitution of Pakistan
- President of Pakistan
- Prime Minister of Pakistan
- Ministry of Defence Pakistan
- Foreign Minister of Pakistan
- Finance Minister of Pakistan
- Interior Minister of Pakistan
- Ministry of Defence Production
