= Sobho Dero =

Sobhodero
- سوبھوڈیرو/سوڀوديرو
- Location within Sindh
- Coordinates: 27.39°N 68.50°E
- Country: Pakistan
- Province: Sindh
- Elevation: 14 m (46 ft)
- Time zone: UTC+5 (PST)
- Number of towns: 1
- Populations: 353562

Sobho Dero is a town in the Khairpur District of Sindh province, Pakistan. It is located at 27°18'0N 68°24'0E with an altitude of 46 metres (154 feet). It is a Tehsil Headquarter.
