= Chief Minister of Sindh =

Head of government of Sindh

- Seal of Chief Minister of Sindh

- Provincial Flag of Sindh
- Government of Sindh
- Style: His Excellency
- Member of: Provincial Assembly of Sindh; Cabinet of Sindh
- Reports to: Governor of Sindh; Provincial Assembly of Sindh
- Residence: Chief Minister House, Karachi
- Seat: Karachi
- Appointer: Provincial Assembly of Sindh
- Term length: Five years
- Constituting instrument: Constitution of Pakistan
- Inaugural holder: Muhammad Ayub Khuhro
- Formation: 23 August 1947; 79 years ago
- Website: cm.sindh.gov.pk

The chief minister of Sindh (Sindhi: وزيراعلي, Urdu: وزیر اعلىٰ—Wazīr-e Aʿlá) is the elected head of government of Sindh and serves alongside the Chief Secretary.

The chief minister is the head of the provincial government alongside the Chief Secretary. The Chief Minister of Sindh is elected by the Provincial Assembly of Sindh and is the leader of the provincial Legislature. The office of the Chief Minister is located in Karachi, the capital of the Sindh province and is known as the CM Secretariat.

== Eligibility ==
The Constitution of Pakistan sets the principle of qualifications for which one must meet to be eligible to the office of the Chief Minister. A Chief Minister must be:

- a citizen of Pakistan
- should be a member of the provincial legislature.

The Chief Minister is elected by a majority in the provincial legislative assembly. This is procedurally established by the vote of confidence in the legislative assembly, as suggested by the majority party who is the appointing authority.

== List of premiers (1937–1947) ==
| No. | Name of Premier (pre-partition) | Entered office | Left office | Political party/Notes |
|---|---|---|---|---|
| 1 | Ghulam Hussain Hidayat Ullah | 28 April 1937 | 23 March 1938 | Muslim People's Party |
| 2 | Allah Bux Soomro | 23 March 1938 | 18 April 1940 | Sind Ittehad Party |
| 3 | Mir Bandeh Ali Khan Talpur | 18 April 1940 | 7 March 1941 | All-India Muslim League |
| (2) | Allah Bux Soomro | 7 March 1941 | 14 October 1942 | Sind Ittehad Party |
| (1) | Ghulam Hussain Hidayat Ullah | 14 October 1942 | 14 August 1947 | Muslim People's Party |

== List of chief ministers of Sindh ==
Pakistan Muslim League Pakistan Peoples Party Islami Jamhoori Ittehad Pakistan Muslim League (Q) Caretaker Governor's rule, martial law or office abolished

| Tenure no. | Chief minister | | Party | Term of office | | | Ref. |
| Tenure no. | Portrait | Name | Party | Took office | Left office | Time in office | Ref. |
|---|---|---|---|---|---|---|---|
| 1 | Portrait of Ayub Khuhro | Muhammad Ayub Khuhro (first tenure) | Pakistan Muslim League | August 16, 1947 | April 28, 1948 | 256 days | |
| 2 | Portrait of Pir Ilahi Bux | Pir Ilahi Bux | Pakistan Muslim League | May 3, 1948 | February 4, 1949 | 277 days | |
| 3 | | Yusuf Haroon | Pakistan Muslim League | February 18, 1949 | May 7, 1950 | 1 year, 78 days | |
| 4 | | Qazi Fazlullah Ubaidullah | Pakistan Muslim League | May 8, 1950 | March 24, 1951 | 320 days | |
| 5 | Portrait of Ayub Khuhro | Muhammad Ayub Khuhro (second tenure) | Pakistan Muslim League | March 25, 1951 | December 29, 1951 | 279 days | |
| – | Governor's rule | | | December 29, 1951 | May 22, 1953 | 1 year, 144 days | |
| 6 | | Pirzada Abdul Sattar | Pakistan Muslim League | May 22, 1953 | November 8, 1954 | 1 year, 170 days | |
| 7 | Portrait of Ayub Khuhro | Muhammad Ayub Khuhro (third tenure) | Pakistan Muslim League | November 9, 1954 | October 13, 1955 | 338 days | |
| – | Office abolished Sindh formed part of West Pakistan | | | October 13, 1955 | June 30, 1970 | 14 years, 260 days | |
| – | Martial law administration | | | July 1, 1970 | May 1, 1972 | 1 year, 305 days | |
| 8 | | Mumtaz Bhutto | PPP | May 1, 1972 | December 20, 1973 | 1 year, 233 days | |
| 9 | | Ghulam Mustafa Jatoi | PPP | December 25, 1973 | July 5, 1977 | 3 years, 192 days | |
| – | Martial law administration | | | July 5, 1977 | April 6, 1985 | 7 years, 275 days | |
| 10 | | Ghous Ali Shah | Pakistan Muslim League | April 6, 1985 | April 6, 1988 | 3 years, 0 days | |
| 11 | | Akhtar Ali Ghulam Qazi (first tenure) | IJI | April 11, 1988 | June 24, 1988 | 74 days | |
| – | Governor's rule | | | June 24, 1988 | August 31, 1988 | 68 days | |
| 12 | | Akhtar Ali Ghulam Qazi (second tenure) | IJI | August 31, 1988 | December 2, 1988 | 93 days | |
| 13 | Portrait of Qaim Ali Shah | Qaim Ali Shah (first tenure) | PPP | December 2, 1988 | February 25, 1990 | 1 year, 85 days | |
| 14 | | Aftab Shaban Mirani | PPP | February 25, 1990 | August 6, 1990 | 162 days | |
| 15 | Portrait of Jam Sadiq Ali | Jam Sadiq Ali | IJI | August 6, 1990 | March 5, 1992 | 1 year, 212 days | |
| 16 | | Muzaffar Hussain Shah | IJI | March 6, 1992 | July 19, 1993 | 1 year, 135 days | |
| – | | Syed Ali Madad Shah (caretaker) | Caretaker | July 19, 1993 | October 21, 1993 | 94 days | |
| 17 | | Syed Abdullah Ali Shah | PPP | October 21, 1993 | November 6, 1996 | 3 years, 16 days | |
| – | | Mumtaz Bhutto (caretaker) | Caretaker (SNF) | November 7, 1996 | February 22, 1997 | 107 days | |
| 18 | | Liaquat Ali Jatoi | PML(N) | February 22, 1997 | October 30, 1998 | 1 year, 250 days | |
| – | No chief minister Governor-led and military administration | | | October 30, 1998 | December 17, 2002 | 4 years, 48 days | |
| 19 | | Ali Mohammad Mahar | PML(Q) | December 17, 2002 | June 9, 2004 | 1 year, 175 days | |
| 20 | | Arbab Ghulam Rahim | PML(Q) | June 9, 2004 | November 19, 2007 | 3 years, 163 days | |
| – | | Abdul Qadir Halepota (caretaker) | Caretaker | November 19, 2007 | April 8, 2008 | 141 days | |
| 21 | Portrait of Qaim Ali Shah | Qaim Ali Shah (second tenure) | PPP | April 8, 2008 | March 21, 2013 | 4 years, 347 days | |
| – | | Zahid Qurban Alvi (caretaker) | Caretaker | March 21, 2013 | May 30, 2013 | 70 days | |
| 22 | Portrait of Qaim Ali Shah | Qaim Ali Shah (third tenure) | PPP | May 30, 2013 | July 25, 2016 | 3 years, 56 days | |
| 23 | Portrait of Murad Ali Shah | Murad Ali Shah (first tenure) | PPP | July 29, 2016 | May 28, 2018 | 1 year, 303 days | |
| – | | Fazal-ur-Rehman (caretaker) | Caretaker | June 2, 2018 | August 17, 2018 | 76 days | |
| 24 | Portrait of Murad Ali Shah | Murad Ali Shah (second tenure) | PPP | August 18, 2018 | August 17, 2023 | 4 years, 364 days | |
| – | | Maqbool Baqar (caretaker) | Caretaker | August 17, 2023 | February 27, 2024 | 194 days | |
| 25 | Portrait of Murad Ali Shah | Murad Ali Shah (third tenure) | PPP | February 27, 2024 | Incumbent | 2 years, 247 days | |

== See also ==
- Chief Secretary Sindh
- Provincial Assembly of Sindh
- Chief Minister (Pakistan)
- Government of Sindh
- Governor of Sindh
- Chief Minister of Khyber Pakhtunkhwa
- Chief Minister of Punjab
- Chief Minister of Balochistan
