= A. K. Brohi =

Pakistani politician (1915–1987)

Allah Bukhsh Karim Bukhsh Brohi
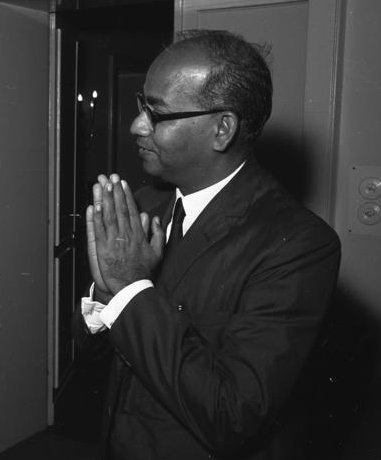
- Born: 1915; Shikharpur, Sindh, British India
- Died: 1987 (aged 71–72); London, England
- Other names: A K Brohi
- Spouse: Khulsoom Brohi
- Children: 3
- Relatives: Syed Qaim Ali Shah (brother-in-law)

Allah Bukhsh Karim Bukhsh Brohi (Urdu: الله بخش کریم بخش بروہی; Sindhi: الھ بخش ڪريم بخش بروھي; (1915 – 1987) known as A.K. Brohi) was a Pakistani politician and lawyer. He originated from Shikarpur in Sindh. He was the first partner, and mentor of famous Indian lawyer Ram Jethmalani as acknowledged in his authorized biography.

He also served as the High Commissioner of Pakistan to India from 1 February 1960 to 31 March 1961.

== Career ==
As a notable attorney in Pakistan's early years, Brohi worked on high-profile cases like a lawsuit from Pakistan's first female editor and publisher, Zaib-un-Nissa Hamidullah, challenging a government ban on her magazine, The Mirror. Brohi won the case for Hamidullah at Pakistan's Supreme Court, setting an important legal precedent for the freedom of the press in the country.

A.K. Brohi was later close to military ruler Zia-ul-Haq and his brand of politics and he has been called "the intellectual behind the General".

He was a scholar and author affiliated with the Traditionalist School of metaphysics (more precisely René Guénon, Frithjof Schuon and Martin Lings).

Brohi served briefly as Attorney-General for Pakistan besides Sharifuddin Pirzada who served as Attorney General during most of General Zia-ul-Haq's regime (1977–1988).

A.K. Brohi also served for a while as Minister of Law and Justice in General Zia-ul-Haq's regime in the late 1970s.

Brohi wrote a long preface for the book of Brigadier General S. K. Malik (i. e. Malik ul-Khan) The Quranic Concept of War (1979), a manual of the brigadier's impression of military tactics from early Islamic times, which has been reprinted in Pakistan and India.

== Family ==
His younger brother, Ali Ahmad Brohi, who died in 2003, was also a writer and scholar, more particularly on Sindhi culture.

His sister Husn Afroze was married to veteran politician Qaim Ali Shah, but died of breast cancer in 1977.

== Publications ==
=== Books ===
- Islam in the Modern World
- The Fundamental Law of Pakistan (1958)
- A Faith to Live By
- Testament of faith
- Adventures in Self-Expression

=== Booklets ===
- The Qurʼān and its impact on human history
- The poetry of Shah Abdul Latif
- Religious way of life

=== Articles ===
- Iqbal and the concept of Islamic socialism in Al-'Ilm, v40 n11 (Sep 1991):38-47

== Awards and recognition ==
- One of the founding members of the Pakistan Academy of Letters. He was nominated in recognition of his services to Pakistani languages and literature (especially philosophy).
