= S. K. Malik =

Pakistani general

S. K. Malik (born 1930) was a soldier and officer of the Pakistan Army (Brigadier General, later Major General). He was a protege of General Muhammed Zia-ul-Haq (1924-1988), the chief of staff of the Pakistan Army, who ruled Pakistan between 1977 and 1988. S. K. Malik wrote works such as The Quranic Concept of Power and The Quranic Concept of War. For the latter work, Zia-ul-Haq wrote the Foreword and Allah Buksh K. Brohi wrote the preface.

== Works ==
- The Quranic Concept of Power
- The Quranic Concept of War
- Khalid bin Walid: the general of Islam; a study in Khalid's generalship
