= Muhammad Rafique (politician, born 1960) =

Pakistani politician

Member of the Provincial Assembly of Sindh
- In office 13 August 2018 – 11 August 2023
- Constituency: PS-29 Khairpur-IV
- In office 29 May 2013 – 28 May 2018

Personal details
- Born: 1 May 1960 (age 65) Khairpur District
- Party: Grand Democratic Alliance (2018-present)

Muhammad Rafique Banbhan is a Pakistani politician who was a Member of the Provincial Assembly of Sindh, from August 2018 to August 2023 and from May 2013 to May 2018.

== Early life ==
He was born on 1 May 1960 in Khairpur District.

== Political career ==
He was elected to the Provincial Assembly of Sindh as a candidate of the Pakistan Muslim League (F) from Constituency PS-31 (Khairpur-III) in the 2013 Pakistani general election.

He was re-elected to Provincial Assembly of Sindh as a candidate of the Grand Democratic Alliance (GDA) from Constituency PS-29 (Khairpur-IV) in the 2018 Pakistani general election.
