= Kadanwari gas field =

Gas field in Khairpur District, Pakistan

- Location within Sindh Location within Pakistan
- Country: Pakistan
- Region: Sindh
- Location: Khairpur District
- Offshore/onshore: Onshore
- Coordinates: 27°7′46″N 69°13′36″E
- Operator: ENI Pakistan
- Partners: OMV Pakistan (22.88%); PPL (15.16%); ENI Pakistan (23.68%); Government Holdings Private Limited (22.50%); Kuwait Foreign Petroleum Exploration Company (15.789%)

Field history
- Discovery: 1989
- Start of development: July 1994
- Start of production: September 1995

Production
- Current production of gas: 75×10^{6} cu ft/d (2.1×10^{6} m^{3}/d)
- Estimated oil in place: 0.26 million barrels (~35,000 t)
- Estimated gas in place: 490×10^{9} cu ft (14×10^{9} m^{3})

Kadanwari gas field (Urdu: قادن واری گیس فیلڈ) is a major gas field located in the Middle Indus Basin of Pakistan.

It was discovered by LASMO in 1989.

United Energy Pakistan took over the operator-ship of the Kadanwari Gas Processing Plant on 1 January 2003 from Lasmo, currently ENI. Kadanwari plant gas processing capacity has been enhanced to 6.6 million cubic metres (232 million cubic feet) per day at standard conditions.

Sui Southern Gas Company buys 990 to 1,220 thousand m^{3} (35 to 43 million ft^{3}) per day of gas from this gas field, while it has the capacity of supplying 1,700 thousand cubic metres (60 million cubic feet) per day of gas.

It has an air link to Karachi via Kadanwari Airport, with flights operated on charter basis.

== See also ==
- Energy law
- Sawan Gas Field
