= Abdullah Ali Shah =

Chief Minister of Sindh and Member Of Pakistan Peoples Party

Syed Abdullah Ali Shah Lakyari

Chief Minister of Sindh
- In office 21 October 1993 – 6 November 1996
- Governor: Hakeem Muhammad Saeed; Mahmoud Haroon; Kamaluddin Azfar
- Preceded by: Syed Ali Madad Shah
- Succeeded by: Mumtaz Bhutto

Personal details
- Born: 11 December 1934 Dadu District, Sindh, Pakistan
- Died: 14 April 2007 (aged 72)
- Citizenship: Pakistan
- Party: Pakistan People's Party
- Children: Murad Ali Shah

Syed Abdullah Ali Shah (Urdu: سید عبد الله على لکیاری شاہ, 11 December 1934 – 14 April 2007) was a Pakistani politician and lawyer who served as chief minister of the Sindh province of Pakistan from 1993 to 1996.

== Life ==
Syed Abdullah Ali Shah was born on 11 December 1934 in Wahur village in Dadu District of Sindh province. He was educated in Karachi and graduated as a lawyer. He was married and had five daughters and two sons. His son Syed Murad Ali Shah is the current chief minister of Sindh. Abdullah Shah joined the Pakistan Peoples Party (PPP) in 1970 and was provincial minister during the tenure of former Chief Minister Mumtaz Bhutto. Syed Abdullah Shah held the position of Speaker of Sindh Assembly from December 1988 to August 1990 and the Chief Minister of Sindh from 21 October 1993 to 6 November 1996. Abdullah Shah was a close confidant of Prime Minister Bhutto. Ms. Bhutto has said, "Shah Sahib was the son of the soil of Sindh and Pakistan. A brave man, he lived and died for his country and for the love and prosperity of the most impoverished."

== See also ==
- Chief Minister of Sindh
- Provincial Assembly of Sindh
- Government of Sindh
- Syed Murad Ali Shah

Political offices Chief Minister of Sindh
Preceded by Syed Ali Madad Shah	1st term 21 October 1992	Succeeded by Mumtaz Bhutto
