= Murad Ali Shah =

Chief Minister Of Sindh and Member Of Pakistan Peoples Party

Syed Murad Ali Shah Lakyari
- سید مراد على شاه لکیاری
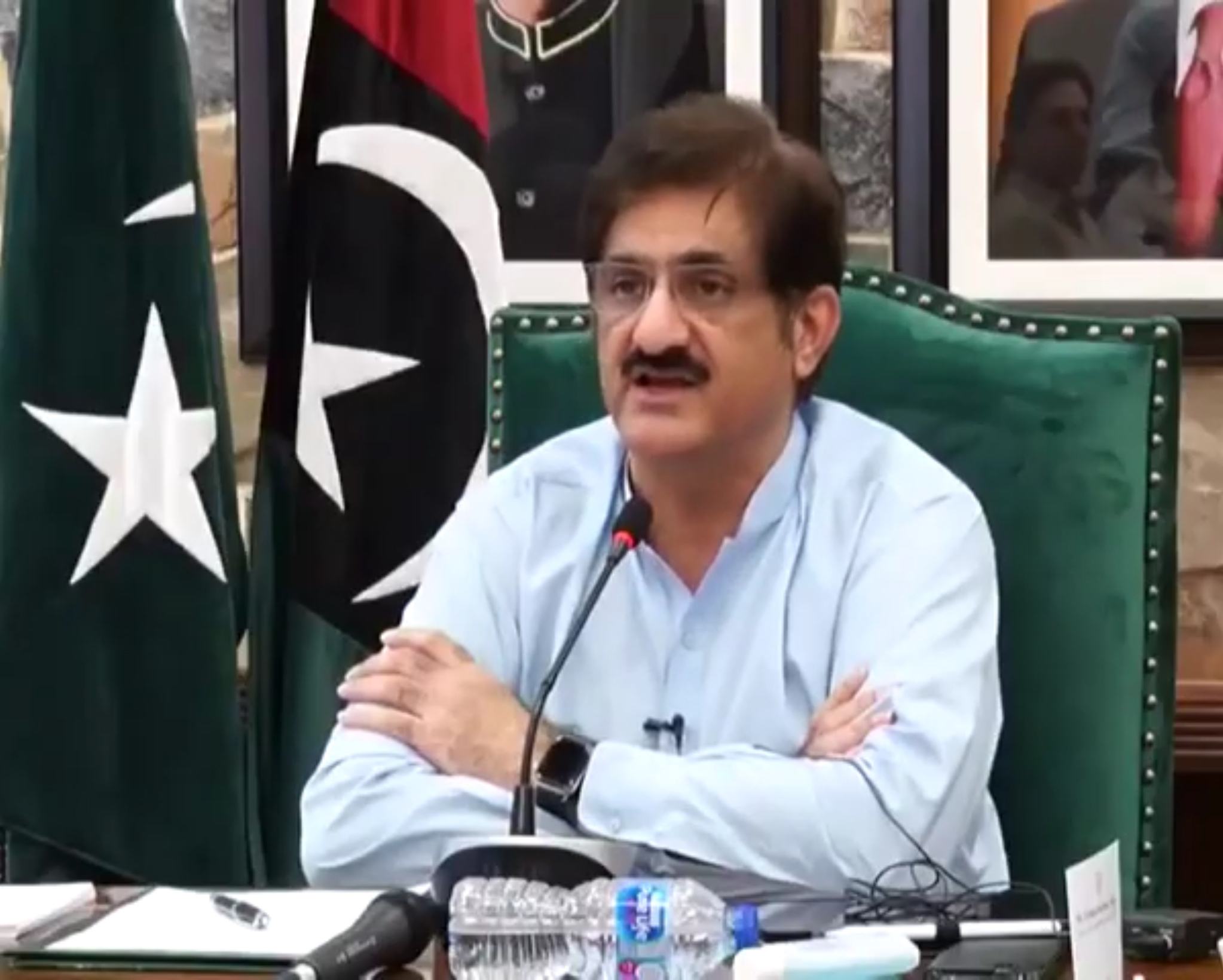

29th Chief Minister of Sindh
- Incumbent
- Assumed office 27 February 2024
- Governor: Kamran Tessori; Nehal Hashmi
- Preceded by: Maqbool Baqar (caretaker)
- In office 18 August 2018 – 17 August 2023
- Governor: Agha Siraj Durrani (acting); Imran Ismail; Kamran Tessori
- Preceded by: Fazal-ur-Rehman (caretaker)
- Succeeded by: Maqbool Baqar (caretaker)
- In office 29 July 2016 – 28 May 2018
- Governor: Ishratul Ibad; Saeeduzzaman Siddiqui; Muhammad Zubair
- Preceded by: Qaim Ali Shah
- Succeeded by: Fazal-ur-Rehman (caretaker)

Provincial Minister of Sindh for Finance
- In office 2013–2016

Provincial Minister of Sindh for Irrigation
- In office 2008–2013

Member of the Provincial Assembly of Sindh
- Incumbent
- Assumed office 25 February 2024
- Constituency: PS-77 Jamshoro-I
- In office 13 August 2018 – 11 August 2023
- Constituency: PS-80 Jamshoro-I
- In office 29 May 2013 – 28 May 2018
- Constituency: PS-73 Jamshoro-cum-Dadu
- In office 2008–2013
- Constituency: PS-73 Jamshoro-cum-Dadu
- In office 2002–2007
- Constituency: PS-73 Jamshoro-cum-Dadu

Personal details
- Born: 8 November 1962 (age 63) Karachi, Sindh, Pakistan
- Citizenship: Pakistani
- Party: PPP (2007–present)
- Parent: Syed Abdullah Ali Shah Lakyari (father)
- Education: NED University of Engineering and Technology; Stanford University

Syed Murad Ali Shah Lakyari (Urdu: سید مراد على شاه لکیاری; Sindhi: سيد مراد علي شاھ لڪياري; born 8 November 1962) is a Pakistani politician and structural engineer who is currently serving as the Chief Minister of Sindh, a province of Pakistan. He is also a member of the Sindh Assembly. He is currently serving a third term as Chief Minister. Shah earlier held portfolios such as Minister of Irrigation of Sindh and Finance Minister of Sindh.

== Early life and education ==
Shah was born in Karachi, West Pakistan, to a Sindhi Muslim Lakyari Syed family. His father, Syed Abdullah Ali Shah also served as the chief minister of Sindh. Murad Ali Shah is the descendent of Sufi saint of Shah Sadaruddin Lakyari (Lakhi Shah Sadar) near Sehwan Sharif. Shah matriculated from Saint Patrick's High School, did intermediate studies at D. J. Sindh Government Science College in Karachi, and was admitted to the engineering programme at the NED University of Engineering and Technology. He graduated with a B.E. in civil engineering and was a silver medalist on his graduation from the NED. After earning the Quaid-e-Azam scholarship, he went to the United States and attended Stanford University in California where he completed his M.Sc. in structural engineering. He completed a second master's from Stanford University two years later in economic systems where again he was on an international scholarship.

From 1986 to 1990, Shah pursued his engineering career with the Government of Sindh as a water engineer at the Water and Power Development Authority in Lahore. He later went to join the Port Qasim Authority in Karachi. He was also a city engineer for Hyderabad's Development Authority. He was an engineer at Wapda, Port Qasim Authority and the Hyderabad Development Authority, before joining Citibank. Shah worked for Citibank in Sindh and in London. He also worked at the Gulf Investment Corporation in Kuwait.

== Political career ==
He became a member of the Provincial Assembly of Sindh in 2002 for the first time representing PS-73 (Dadu III). He was elected to the Sindh Assembly in 2008 as a member of the Pakistan Peoples Party and was the provincial Minister for Irrigation in Syed Qaim Ali Shah's cabinet. In 2013, he was made the provincial finance minister. In July 2016, Shah was elected to the chief minister's office.

He was minister for irrigation (Sindh) and finance minister of Sindh before his elevation to chief minister of Sindh in 2016. Shah was barred from contesting in 2013 despite giving up his Canadian citizenship. After proving to the courts that he did not hold Canadian nationality, Shah was able to run in the election. He was elected to the Sindh Assembly for a third consecutive time. He was subsequently assigned the finance ministry in the provincial cabinet.

== Chief Minister of Sindh (2016-present) ==
Murad Ali Shah became Chief Minister of Sindh on 29 July 2016 after the ruling Pakistan Peoples Party (PPP) made the decision to replace Chief Minister Syed Qaim Ali Shah with Murad. Murad Ali Shah would become Sindh's first and only Chief Minister to serve 3 consecutive times in a row. He served as Chief Minister from 2016 until the 2018 Sindh provincial election, in which he was elected for the second time as Chief Minister as a PPP candidate. He would serve as Chief Minister for a relative full term until the 2024 Sindh provincial election in which he was elected for the third time on a PPP ticket. Opposition to Murad, primarily the Grand Democratic Alliance, Jamaat-e-Islami and Pakistan Tehreek-e-Insaf have protested against electoral manipulation by the PPP in provincial elections several times, primarily in 2024, where Murad's first few months in office were amid widespread protests against PPP rigging, giving insight on problems regarding the sanctity of democracy in Pakistan.

=== Policies and criticism ===
Murad Ali Shah was originally appointed for the slot of Chief Minister by PPP due to his skill in distributing water and financial resources during his time in the federal government as well as his closeness to Benazir Bhutto according to PPP. However, critics and opposition to Murad accuse him and the PPP provincial government of bad governance, poor infrastructure, "ghost" schools, lack of government action, poor distribution of medicine and needs, bad management of government departments and an overall lack of development.

According to some opposition politicians, the province has seen little to no government development or action with some suggesting that Sindh's infrastructural and medical systems have worsened since Murad took office.

Political offices Chief Minister of Sindh
| Preceded by Qaim Ali Shah | 1st term 2016-2018 | Succeeded by Fazlur Rehman (caretaker) |
| Preceded by Fazlur Rehman (caretaker) | 2nd term 2018-Incumbent | Succeeded by Incumbent |
