= Nafisa Shah =

Pakistani politician (born 1968)

Syeda Nafisa Shah Jilani

Member of the National Assembly of Pakistan
- Incumbent
- Assumed office 29 February 2024
- Constituency: NA-202 Khairpur-I
- In office 13 August 2018 – 10 August 2023
- Constituency: NA-208 (Khairpur-I)
- In office 17 March 2008 – 31 May 2018
- Constituency: Reserved seat for women

District Nazim of Khairpur
- In office 2001–2007

Personal details
- Born: 20 January 1968 (age 58) Khairpur, Sindh, Pakistan
- Citizenship: Pakistani
- Party: PPP (2008-present)
- Parent: Qaim Ali Shah (father)

Syeda Nafisa Shah Jilani (Urdu: نفيسہ شاہ; born 20 January 1968) is a Pakistani politician who has been a member of the National Assembly of Pakistan since February 2024, having previously served in this position from August 2018 till August 2023 and from March 2008 to May 2018.

== Early life and education ==
Jilani was born on 20 January 1968 in Khairpur, Sindh to Qaim Ali Shah.

She has a doctorate in Social and Cultural Anthropology from the University of Oxford.

== Political career ==
Jilani served as Nazim of District Khairpur from 2001 to 2007.

She was elected to the National Assembly of Pakistan on a reserved seat for women as a candidate of Pakistan Peoples Party (PPP) from Sindh in the 2008 Pakistani general election. She served as chair of the National Commission for Human Development and general secretary of the Women's Parliamentary Caucus between 2008 and 2013.

She has been vice president of the Commonwealth Parliamentary Association. She also headed the National Commission for Human Development. In 2011, she was awarded a Ph.D degree by the University of Oxford for her study on honour killing in Sindh.

She was re-elected to the National Assembly as a candidate of PPP on a seat reserved for women from Sindh in the 2013 Pakistani general election for the second time.

She was re-elected to the National Assembly as a candidate of PPP from NA-208 (Khairpur-I) in the 2018 Pakistani general election. She received 107,978 votes and defeated Syed Ghous Ali Shah, a candidate of the Grand Democratic Alliance (GDA).

She was re-elected to the National Assembly as a candidate of PPP from NA-202 Khairpur-I in the 2024 Pakistani general election. She received 152,511 votes and defeated Syed Ghous Ali Shah, a candidate of the GDA.

== books ==
- Honour Unmasked: Gender Violence, Law, and Power in Pakistan – 2016
- Honour and Violence: Gender, Power and Law in Southern Pakistan. 2017
