= Aftab Shaban Mirani =

Pakistani politician (1940–2025)

Aftab Shahban Mirani
- آفتاب شعبان ميراڻي

19th Minister of Defense
- In office 19 October 1993 – 5 November 1996
- Prime Minister: Benazir Bhutto
- Preceded by: Ghous Ali Shah
- Succeeded by: Shahid Hamid (caretaker)

Chief Minister of Sindh
- In office 25 February 1990 – 6 August 1990
- Governor: Fakhruddin G. Ebrahim
- Preceded by: Qaim Ali Shah
- Succeeded by: Jam Sadiq Ali

Member of the National Assembly of Pakistan
- In office 13 August 2018 – 10 August 2023
- Constituency: NA-202 (Qambar Shahdadkot-I)
- In office March 2008 – May 2018
- Constituency: NA-202 (Shikarpur-I)

Personal details
- Born: 1940 Shikarpur, Sind Province, British India (now Pakistan)
- Died: 1 November 2025 (aged 84–85) Karachi, Pakistan
- Party: Pakistan People's Party

Aftab Shaban Mirani (Sindhi: آفتاب شعبان ميراڻي; Urdu: آفتاب شعبان ميرانی; 1940 – 1 November 2025) was a Pakistani politician who was a member of the National Assembly of Pakistan from August 2018 until August 2023. Previously, he was a member of the National Assembly from May 2014 to May 2018. He briefly served as Chief Minister of Sindh in 1990.

== Early life ==
Aftab Shaban Mirani was born in Shikarpur, Sind Province, British India in 1940. He graduated from the University of Sindh and later attended a training course in agriculture in the United States.

Politics was deeply rooted in his family. His father, Ghulam Qadir Shaban, was elected as a Member of the Central Legislative Assembly in 1937. His mother, Begum Sharaf-un-Nisa Shaban, was an active participant in the Pakistan Movement and served as General Secretary of the Women’s Wing of the Sindh Muslim League. She was also the first elected Muslim woman member of the Sindh Assembly. In recognition of her social services, she received the title of “Kaiser-i-Hind” from the Viceroy of India—the only woman from Sindh to receive this distinction. However, she later returned the award on the instructions of Quaid-e-Azam Muhammad Ali Jinnah.

Aftab Shaban’s maternal uncle, Ali Bakhsh Muhammad Hussain, was an elected member of the India Council of State in 1920. Another uncle, Nabi Bakhsh Muhammad Hussain, served as the Prime Minister of the State of Bahawalpur for 13 consecutive years, while a third uncle, Abdul Qadir Muhammad Hussain, also served as the Prime Minister of the State of Junagadh for a considerable period.

== Political career ==
Mirani served as Chief Minister of Sindh in 1990.

He served as Defence Minister of Pakistan in Benazir Bhutto's government from October 1993 to November 1996.

Mirani was elected to the National Assembly of Pakistan from the Constituency NA-202 (Shikarpur-I) in the 2008 Pakistani general election.

Mirani was re-elected to the National Assembly from the Constituency NA-202 (Shikarpur-I) in the 2013 Pakistani general election.

He was re-elected to the National Assembly as a candidate of Pakistan Peoples Party (PPP) from Constituency NA-202 (Qambar Shahdadkot-I) in the 2018 Pakistani general election.

== Death ==
Mirani died in Karachi on 1 November 2025.

Political offices
Preceded by Qaim Ali Shah	Chief Minister of Sindh; 1990	Succeeded by Jam Sadiq Ali
Preceded by Ghous Ali Shah	Defence Minister of Pakistan; 1993–1996	Succeeded by Shahid Hamid (Caretaker)
