= Sawan gas field =

Gasfield in Sindh, Pakistan

- Location within Sindh Location within Pakistan
- Country: Pakistan
- Region: Sindh
- Location: Kathore village UC Ahsaanabad Nara Taluka Khairpur District
- Offshore/onshore: Onshore
- Coordinates: 26.9837298°N 68.905031°E
- Operator: OMV Pakistan
- Partners: OMV Pakistan (19.74%); PPL (26.18%); ENI Pakistan (23.68%); Government Holdings Private Limited (22.50%) OGDCL; Moravske naftove doly (7.90%)

Field history
- Discovery: 1998
- Start of production: October 22, 2003

Production
- Current production of gas: 310×10^{6} cu ft/d (8.8×10^{6} m^{3}/d)

Sawan Gas Field is located in Nara Taluka, Sindh, Pakistan. It is a joint venture of OMV Pakistan, ENI Pakistan, PPL, Moravské naftové doly and Government Holdings (Private) Limited. Production peaked in 2007 and by late 2023, the field's operator had recovered 97% of the recoverable reserves. Sawan was and still is one of the largest discoveries of gas reserves in Pakistan.

The operator of the field is OMV Pakistan. It has commercially usable reserves of more than 45 billion cubic metres and OMV Pakistan share of the production is around 13,000 barrels (2,100 cubic metres) per day of oil equivalent.

Sawan Gas Plant has its own airfield for transportation of staff due to its remote location. The airfield is known as Sawan Airport.

ENI announced in June 2020, amidst the COVID-19 pandemic, that it was putting its Pakistan assets up for sale.

== See also ==
- Kadanwari Gas Field
