= Akhtar Ali G. Kazi =

Pakistani politician

Akhtar Ali Ghulam Kazi

16th Chief Minister of Sindh
- In office 11 April 1988 – 24 June 1988
- Preceded by: Ghous Ali Shah
- Succeeded by: Governor's Rule

18th Chief Minister of Sindh
- In office 31 August 1988 – 2 December 1988
- Preceded by: Governor's Rule
- Succeeded by: Qaim Ali Shah

Personal details
- Born: September 17, 1944 Paat town, Dadu district, Sindh, Pakistan
- Died: October 14, 2010 (aged 66) Karachi, Pakistan
- Party: Islami Jamhoori Ittehad

Akhtar Ali G. Kazi (17 September 1944 – 14 October 2010) was a Pakistani politician who served as 16th Chief Minister of Sindh from 11 April 1988 to 24 June 1988 and then as 18th Chief Minister of Sindh in his 2nd term from 31 August 1988 to 2 December 1988.

== Early life and education ==
Kazi was born on 17 September 1944 in Paat, a town in the Dadu District of Sindh. His father, Ghulam Mustafa Kazi, was a government officer who served in various capacities, including Collector, Deputy Commissioner, Secretary, and Commissioner.

He completed his matriculation at N.J.V. School, Karachi, and obtained a law degree from S.M. Arts College, Karachi. He later earned a Master of Arts in Economics from the University of Karachi.

== Career ==
Following his education, he began his legal practice in Larkana, Sindh. He was an active member and office-bearer of the Larkana Bar Association and the Sindh Bar Council. He also served as the founding principal of Larkana Law College and established an arts and commerce college in Larkana. In addition, he held the position of Dean, Faculty of Law, at the University of Sindh.

He served as chief minister of Sindh in 1988.

== Death ==
Akhtar Ali G. Kazi died on Thursday, October 14, 2010, in Karachi and was laid to rest at the Mewa Shah Graveyard in Karachi.

Political offices
Preceded by Ghous Ali Shah	Chief Minister of Sindh; 11 April 1988 – 24 June 1988	Succeeded by Governor's Rule
Preceded by Governor's Rule	2nd Term; 31 August 1988 – 2 December 1988	Succeeded by Qaim Ali Shah
