= Nara Tehsil =

Administrative area in Sindh, Pakistan

Nara Taluka نارا (Urdu) نارو (Sindhi)
- Town
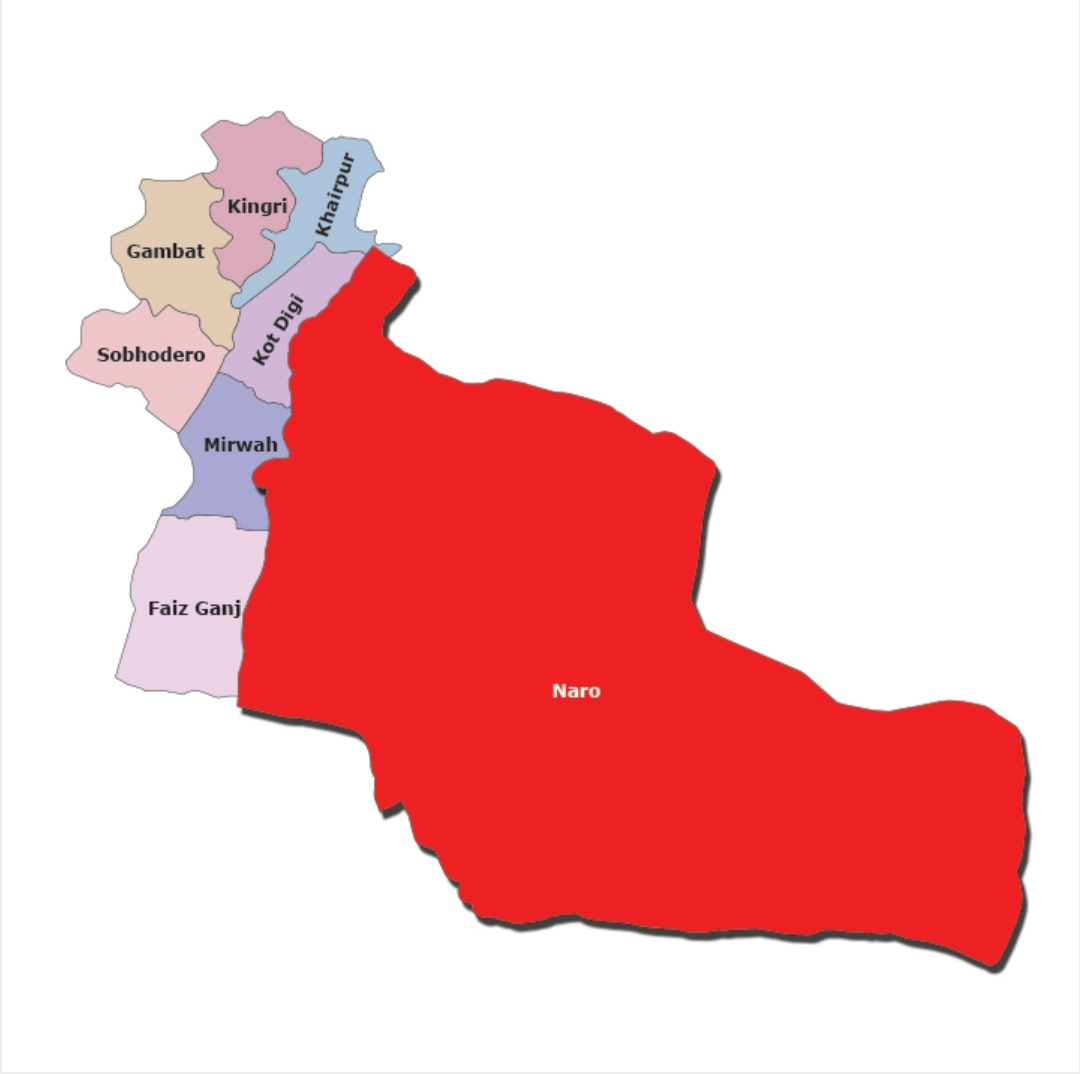
- Nara Taluka Map

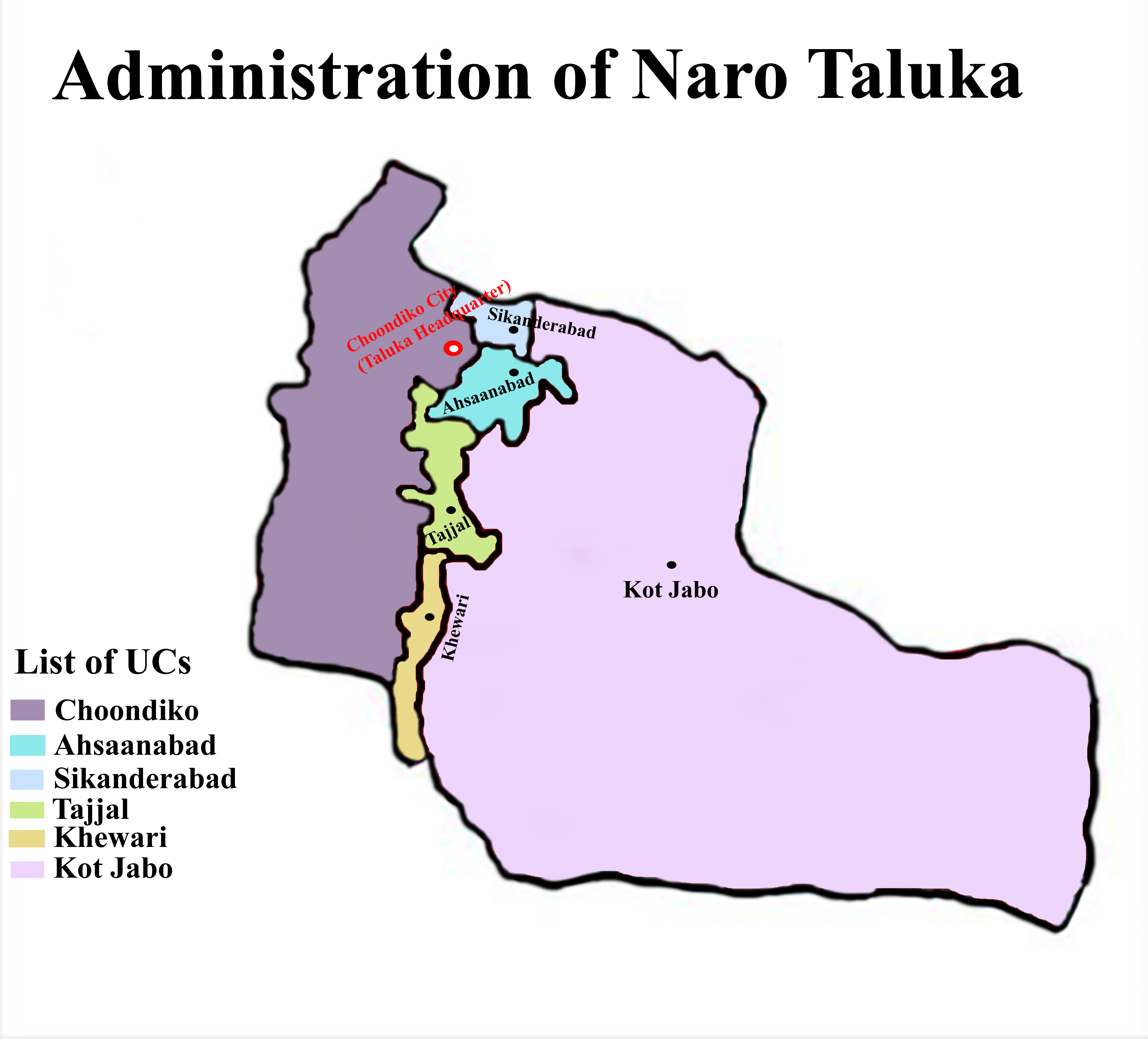

- Location within Sindh Location within Pakistan
- Coordinates: 27°00′N 68°59′E
- Country: Pakistan
- Province: Sindh
- Division: Sukkur
- District: Khairpur District
- Capital: Choondiko
- Union Councils: Seven (07): Choondiko; Ahsaanabad; (Dodo Faqeer Aradin): Kot Jabo; village Imam Bux Shar (Matahri); Khenwari; Tajjal Sharif; Sikandarabad
- Tehsil Status: N/A

Government
  - Taluka chairman: N/A
- Elevation: 13 m (43 ft)

Population (2017 Census of Pakistan)
  - Tehsil: 160,985
- Time zone: UTC+5 (PST)
- Calling code: N/A

Nara (Urdu: نارا, Sindhi: نارو) is a taluka (tehsil subdivision) of the Khairpur District in the Sindh province of Pakistan, about 56 kilometers from the old Khairpur city. Choondiko city is the headquarter of the taluka.
