= Fazalur Rehman (civil servant) =

Pakistani politician

Fazal-ur-Rehman

Chief Minister of Sindh (caretaker)
- In office 2 June 2018 – 18 August 2018
- Governor: Agha Siraj Durrani (Acting); Muhammad Zubair Umar
- Preceded by: Syed Murad Ali Shah
- Succeeded by: Syed Murad Ali Shah

Fazal-ur-Rehman (Urdu: فضل الرحمان) is a retired Pakistani bureaucrat, who belonged to Pakistan Audit and Accounts Service and served in BPS-22 grade as Maritime Secretary of Pakistan, Chief Secretary Sindh and Chairman Trading Corporation of Pakistan. Fazal also served as the Chief Minister of Sindh from June 2018 to August 2018 in a caretaker capacity.

Fazal remained a prominent civil servant in Sindh, having served as the provincial administrative boss twice. He retired from the civil service in 2010. Fazal was appointed to be the caretaker chief minister of Sindh ahead of the 2018 general elections and was sworn into office on 2 June 2018.

Political offices Chief Minister of Sindh
Preceded by Syed Murad Ali Shah	Caretaker; 2018	Succeeded by Syed Murad Ali Shah
