= Zahid Qurban Alvi =

Pakistani politician

Zahid Qurban Alavi

Caretaker Chief Minister of Sindh
- In office 21 March 2013 – 30 May 2013
- President: Asif Ali Zardari
- Prime Minister: Raja Pervez Ashraf
- Governor: Dr. Ishrat-ul-Ibad Khan
- Preceded by: Qaim Ali Shah
- Succeeded by: Qaim Ali Shah

Personal details
- Citizenship: Pakistani

Zahid Qurban Alavi (Urdu: زاہد قربان علوی), commonly spelled as Zahid Qurban Alvi, was the interim caretaker Chief Minister of Sindh, Pakistan in 2013. He was nominated by the preceding Chief Minister Qaim Ali Shah and Opposition leader in the Sindh Assembly Syed Sardar Ahmed.

Political offices
| Preceded by Qaim Ali Shah | Chief Minister of Sindh; 20 March 2013 - 30 May 2013 | Succeeded by Qaim Ali Shah |
