= Piryaloi =

Piryaloi پريالوءِ

- Location within Sindh
- Coordinates: 27°38′50.529″N 68°43′1.156″E
- Country: Pakistan
- Province: Sindh
- District: Khairpur
- Time zone: UTC+5 (PST)
- Postal code: 66000
- Calling code: 0243

Piryaloi (Sindhi: پريالوءِ) is a small town of Khairpur District in Sindh province, Pakistan. The town is located on the left bank of the Indus River near Sukkur Barrage. The main access to the town is through Sukkur–Pir Jo Goth road at Piryaloi Pul bus stop.

== History ==
Piryaloi, formerly called Piryanloi, means "land of the beloved" in Sindhi. The town came to be called so after Syed Saleh Shah Bukhari Naqvi, a 17th-century dervish inhabited this place and the people of the surrounding area, out of love for this pious man, called his abode Piryan (beloved) + Loi (place).

Piryaloi is a predominantly agrarian town, where the main source of income is based on agricultural products. Date palms and mangoes are among the major products of the region.

== See also ==
- Khairpur (princely state)
