= Syed Qaim Ali Shah =

Pakistani politician (born 1924)

MPA Syed Qaim Ali Shah
- سید قائم علی شاہ
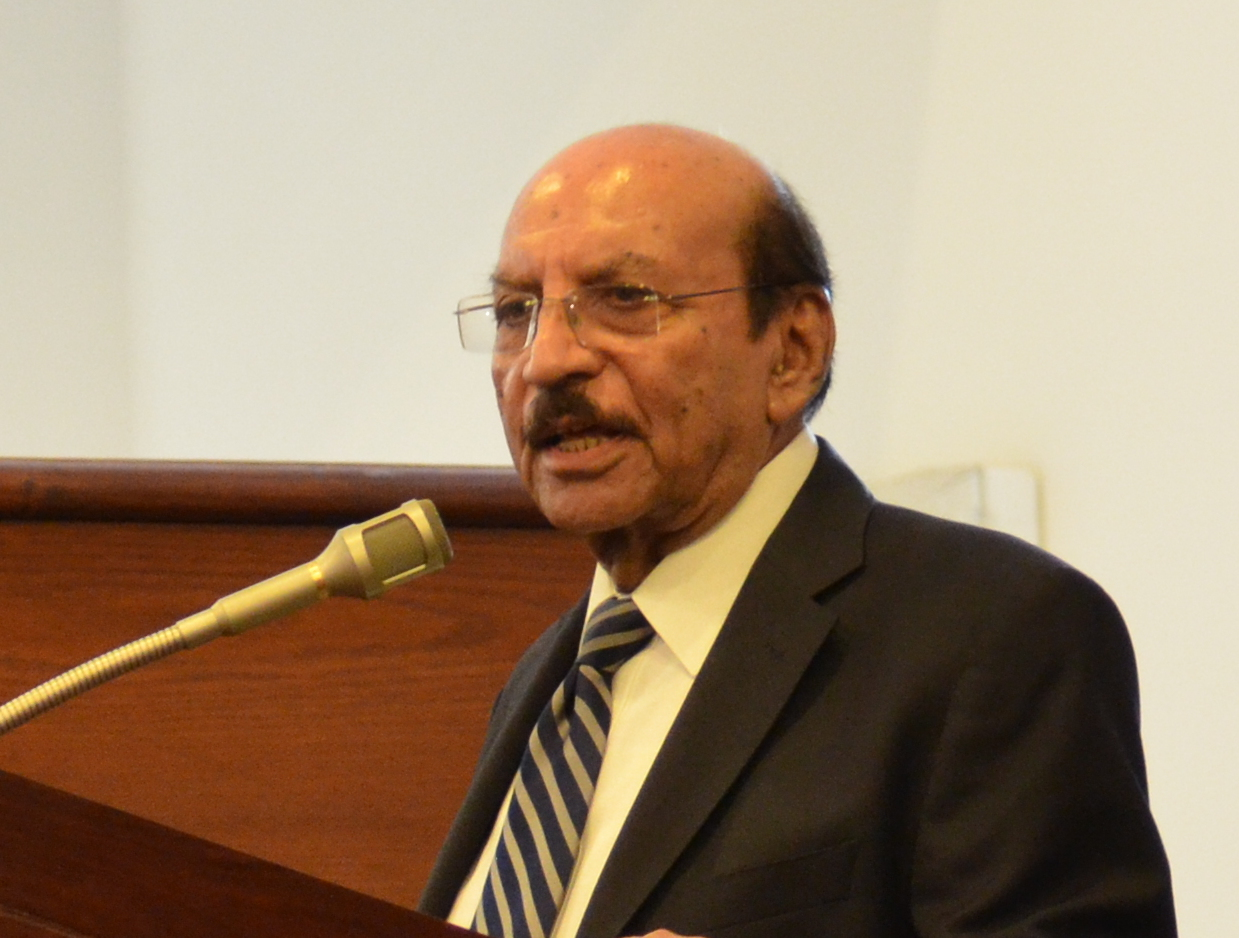

170th Chief Minister of Sindh
- In office 30 May 2013 – 25 July 2016
- President: Mamnoon Hussain
- Prime Minister: Nawaz Sharif
- Governor: Ishrat-ul-Ibad Khan
- Preceded by: Zahid Qurban Alvi
- Succeeded by: Syed Murad Ali Shah
- In office 6 April 2008 – 20 March 2013
- President: Asif Ali Zardari
- Prime Minister: Yusuf Raza Gillani; Raja Parvez Ashraf; Mir Hazar Khan Khoso
- Governor: Ishrat-ul-Ibad Khan
- Preceded by: Abdul Qadir Halepota
- Succeeded by: Zahid Qurban Alvi
- In office 2 December 1988 – 25 February 1990
- President: Ghulam Ishaq Khan
- Prime Minister: Benazir Bhutto
- Governor: Qadeeruddin Ahmed; Fakhruddin G. Ebrahim
- Preceded by: Akhtar Ali Ghulam Qazi
- Succeeded by: Aftab Shaban Mirani

Member of the Provincial Assembly of Sindh
- Incumbent
- Assumed office 25 February 2024
- Constituency: PS-26 Khairpur-I
- In office 13 August 2018 – 11 August 2023
- Constituency: PS-26 Khairpur-I
- In office 2013–2018
- Constituency: PS-29 (Khairpur-I)
- In office 2008–2013
- Constituency: PS-29 (Khairpur-I)

Personal details
- Born: 13 September 1928 (age 97) Khairpur, British India
- Party: PPP (1967-present)
- Children: Nafisa Shah (daughter)

Syed Qaim Ali Shah (Sindhi: سيد قائم علي شاه ,Urdu: سید قائم علی شاہ) is a Pakistani politician who served as the elected Chief Minister of Sindh for three terms. His last two terms combined, a total of eight years, make him the longest serving Chief Minister of Sindh. He is Sindh President of the Pakistan Peoples Party (PPP) and has been serving as an elected Member of Provincial Assembly (MPA) from PS-26 (Khairpur-1) since February 2024.

== Education ==
Syed Qaim Ali Shah was born on 13 September 1928 to Syed Ramzan Ali Shah Jillani in Khairpur Mirs. Shah's household was counted amongst Khayrpur state's more influential and educated families. After completing his early education at Naz High School, Shah's family married young Shah to a relative. Shah then proceeded to Karachi for higher education.

In Karachi, Shah enrolled at Karachi University and received a Bachelor of Arts. Later, he received a Bachelor of Laws from S. M. Law College.

During the course of his studies at Sindh Muslim Law College, Shah benefited from the company and guidance of his then professor, Zulfikar Ali Bhutto, building a bond that would last for the duration of his professor's life.

== Political career ==
Shah entered politics on being elected the Chairman of Khairpur's district council under Field Marshal Ayub Khan’s system of Basic Democracy in the 1960s. His close association with Bhutto led to his joining Zulfikar Ali Bhutto’s PPP shortly after PPP’s creation in 1967.

He contested general elections of 1970 with a PPP-ticket from Khairpur Mirs and defeated his opponents, Comrade Syed Baqir Ali Shah (provincial president of National Awami Party (Wali) and Council Member of Communist Party of Pakistan) and Syed Ghous Ali Shah. Recognizing young Shah's capability, Prime Minister Zulfikar Ali Bhutto appointed Qaim Ali Shah to his small cabinet as the Federal Minister for Industries and Kashmir Affairs.

After General Zia-ul-Haq's coup d'état in July 1977, Shah was arrested along with Bhutto and other cabinet ministers. Unlike other PPP bigwigs such as Ghulam Mustafa Jatoi, Ghulam Mustafa Khar, Makhdoom Khaliq-uz-Zaman, Mir Hazar Khan Bijarani, who either left the party or became inactive, Qaim Ali Shah remained loyal to the party. During the eleven years of Gen. Zia-ul-Haq’s rule, Shah, and members of his family suffered imprisonment, torture, virtual poverty (as accounts and lands were seized), and constant fear. Most notably, Shah’s politically active nephew, Syed Pervez Ali Shah attained ‘Prisoner of Conscience’ status in Amnesty International's 1985 report for enduring six years of torture in General Zia's torture cells. Benazir Bhutto's autobiography, Daughter of the East, records Parvez's ordeal in greater detail.

With General Zia's death and Benazir Bhutto’s return to the country, Shah was appointed the president of PPP-Sindh in recognition of his services to the Movement for Restoration of Democracy (MRD) and PPP. His landslide victory in the 1988 elections from his constituency, Khairpur Mirs, paved way for his appointment as the 17th Chief Minister of Sindh on 2 December 1988.

Subsequently, Shah was elected as a Member of Provincial Assembly (MPA), Sindh in 1990, 1993, 2002 and 2008. He lost the only election of his career in 1997 when the PPP was nearly routed from parliament. Later, he made a bid for a senate seat, and won his first and only senate term in late 1997.

He won seven out of eight general elections he contested, becoming a MPA six times, and Member of National Assembly (MNA) and senator once. Shah completed his 2nd term as Chief Minister of Sindh on 21 March 2013.

He was once again, for the third time, elected to the office of Chief Minister of Sindh after the 2013 general elections. In July 2016, the PPP leadership decided to replace Shah with Syed Murad Ali Shah as CM Sindh. He remained the member of Sindh assembly until the end of his term.

== Personal life ==
Shah has had three wives. His first marriage was arranged by his family during his teenage years to a cousin. After Shah completed his education in Karachi, his family, in accordance with the customs of the day, arranged his second marriage to Husn Afroze Brohi, sister of A. K. Brohi. Neither of his wives outlived him. Husn Afroze suffered from breast cancer and died in the late 1970s and Shah's first wife died from terminal illness a few years later. After several years as a widower, Shah contracted his marriage to his current wife according to the wishes of his family and friends.

Syed Qaim Ali Shah has four sons and seven daughters. Politician Nafisa Shah is his daughter from his marriage to Husn Afroze.

== See also ==
- Chief Minister of Sindh
- List of Pakistanis by net worth

Political offices Chief Minister of Sindh
| Preceded by Akhtar Ali Kazi | 1st term 2 December 1988 – 25 February 1990 | Succeeded by Aftab Shaban Mirani |
| Preceded by Abdul Qadir Halepoto | 2nd term 6 April 2008 – 20 March 2013 | Succeeded by Zahid Qurban Alvi |
| Preceded by Zahid Qurban Alvi | 3rd term 30 May 2013 | Succeeded by Syed Murad Ali Shah |
