= Manzoor Wassan =

Pakistani politician

Manzoor Hussain Wassan

Member of the Provincial Assembly of Sindh
- In office 31 May 2013 – 28 May 2018

Personal details
- Born: 15 July 1957 (age 68) Khairpur, Sindh, Pakistan
- Party: Pakistan Peoples Party
- Children: Munawar Ali Wassan (son-in-law)

Manzoor Wassan (Urdu: منظور وسان, Sindhi: منظور وسان; born 15 July 1957) is a Pakistani politician affiliated with the Pakistan Peoples Party (Parliamentarians) who was served as the Minister for Home Affairs of the province of Sindh, but currently he has been disqualified by The Supreme Court of Pakistan. Wassan is a lawyer by profession and hails from the city of Khairpur.

He has been a member of the Provincial Assembly of Sindh four times (1988–90; 90–93; 1997–99; 2008–present) and has previously also been a member of the National Assembly of Pakistan two times (1993–96 and 2002–2007).
