= United Energy Group =

Chinese oil and gas company

- Industry: Oil & gas
- Number of locations: China, Pakistan, Iraq, Egypt, Dubai
- Website: uegl.com.hk

The United Energy Group (UEG) (SEHK: 467) is a Chinese oil & gas exploration and production company. The company pursues projects in Pakistan and Indonesia and is looking into further investment options in South East Asia and the Americas.

== Corporate affairs ==
UEG is a Hong Kong listed company but controlled by Zhang Hongwei, a majority shareholder in mainland China, who owns 71.7% of the company.

== China ==
The company undertook a joint venture with the China National Petroleum Company to develop the Liaohe EOR Project in Liaoning, China until it announced termination of the project in 2016.

== Pakistan ==
In 2012, UEP secured a credit line of $5 billion from China Development Bank for its Pakistani operations and other potential acquisitions.

In March 2018, UEP acquired OMV Pakistan assets for US$192 million.

In FY2019, United Energy Pakistan was the largest foreign oil and gas exploration and production company in Pakistan.
