= Abdul Qadir Halepota =

Pakistani politician

Abdul Qadir Halepota (Sindhi: عبدالقادر هاليپوٽرو) is a former judge of the High Court of Sindh and a member of the Law and Justice Commission of Pakistan. He was caretaker Chief Minister of Sindh province for the 2008 general elections.
