= Gambat =

Pakistani town

Gambat Sindhi: گمبٽ Urdu: گمبٹ
- City
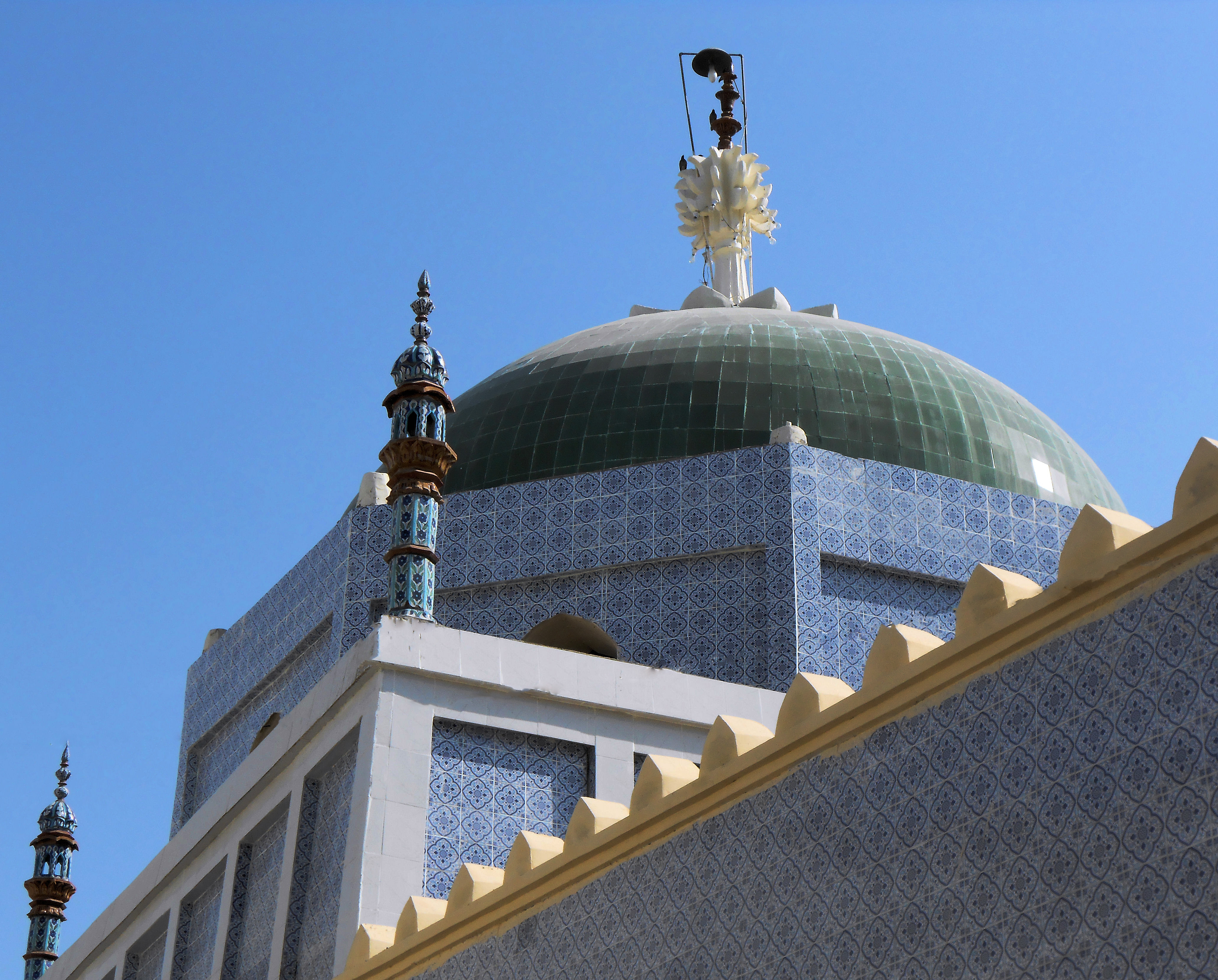
- Tomb of Muhammad Shah Jillani Baghdadi

- Location of Gambat Gambat (Pakistan) Gambat (South Asia) Gambat (Asia)
- Coordinates: 27.21°N 68.31°E
- Country: Pakistan
- Province: Sindh
- Division: Sukkur
- District: Khairpur

Government
  - Type: Municipal Committee
  - Administrator: Samad Ali Khan
- Elevation: 52 m (171 ft)

Population (2023)
  - Total: 59,790
- Time zone: UTC+5 (PST)

Gambat (Sindhi: گمبٽ, Urdu: گمبٹ) is a city and capital of Gambat Tehsil, an administrative subdivision of Khairpur District, located in Sindh province of Pakistan. The city population in 2023 census was 59,790.

The town was significantly affected by the 2022 floods, resulting in the loss of many lives and substantial economic hardship for both the town and the district. The floods also disrupted the railway line, further impacting the region.

A Hindu temple in Gambat serves as a historical site with over a century of cultural and spiritual heritage. It holds significance for the Hindu community, reflecting their longstanding traditions. The temple was renovated in 2024.

The Pir Abdul Qadir Shah Jeelani Institute of Medical Sciences Gambat is a hospital equipped with advanced machinery for transplants and the treatment of various diseases, making it a prominent healthcare facility in the area.

== Demographics ==
Population

Historical population
Year	Pop.	±%
1972	13,962	—
1981	17,455	+25.0%
1998	28,311	+62.2%
2017	52,617	+85.9%
2023	59,790	+13.6%

According to the 2023 Pakistani census, Gambat city had a population of 59,790.

Languages

Languages of Gambat City (2023 Census)
1. Sindhi (97.8%)
2. Punjabi (1.30%)
3. Urdu (0.20%)
4. Others (0.70%)

== See also ==
- Gambat Institute of Medical Sciences
- Gambat Liver Transplant Center
