= Khairpur Tehsil =

خيرپور
- Tehsil
- Khairpur
- Country: Pakistan
- Province: Sindh
- District: Khairpur District

Area
  - Tehsil: 585 km^{2} (226 sq mi)

Population (2023)
  - Tehsil: 465,233
  - Density: 795/km^{2} (2,060/sq mi)
  - Urban: ...
  - Rural: ...

Literacy (2023)
  - Literacy rate: 59.37%
- Time zone: UTC+5 (PST)
- Number of towns: 1
- Number of Union Councils: 24

Khairpur Tehsil (Sindhi: خيرپور) is an administrative subdivision (tehsil) of Khairpur District in the Sindh province of Pakistan. It is administratively subdivided into 24 Union Councils, one of which forms the capital of Khairpur.

Piryaloi town is 20 km from Khairpur city.
