= Ghous Ali Shah =

Pakistani politician

Syed Ghous Ali Shah

Minister of Education
- In office 25 February 1997 – 18 June 1999
- Prime Minister: Nawaz Sharif
- Preceded by: Abida Hussain (caretaker)

18th Minister of Defence
- In office 10 September 1991 – 17 July 1993
- Prime Minister: Nawaz Sharif
- Preceded by: Benazir Bhutto
- Succeeded by: Aftab Shaban Mirani

Chief Minister of Sindh
- In office 6 April 1985 – 6 April 1988
- Preceded by: Ghulam Mustafa Jatoi
- Succeeded by: Akhtar Ali Ghulam Kazi

Provincial Minister of Sindh for Law, Local Bodies & Rural Development
- In office 7 April 1984 – 5 April 1985

Provincial Minister of Sindh for Education, Culture, Sports and Law
- In office 1981–1984

Justice of Sindh High Court
- In office 18 July 1979 – 5 April 1985

Personal details
- Born: 1 January 1934 (age 92) Khairpur, Khairpur State, British India

Syed Ghous Ali Shah (Urdu: سید غوث علی شاہ. Born 1 January 1934) is a Pakistani politician and jurist. He was Chief Minister of Sindh, Pakistan from 1985 to 1988.

He has also remained the Defence Minister of Pakistan from 1991 to 1993 and the Education Minister of Pakistan from 1997 to 1999. He has been elected a Member of National Assembly of Pakistan from his native Constituency NA-215 Khairpur as a result of the 2013 Pakistani general election.

== Education ==
Ghous Ali Shah was born in 1934. He received his secondary education in Naz High School, Khairpur. In the 1950s the School had qualified teachers from all over the country and was one of the most reputed institutions of Sindh. His name is engraved on a plaque and hung up on the "Distinguished Students" board. He graduated from the Sindh Muslim College of the University of Karachi, Pakistan. He did his LLB from the Sindh Muslim Law College of the University of Karachi in 1957.

== Career ==
Shah practiced law until 1979, becoming one of the best criminal law lawyers in the country. He was elected President of the District Bar Association Khairpur for record tenures of six years continuously. He was elected to the highest elected office of the Advocates of Pakistan as the Vice Chairman of the Pakistan Bar Council for two terms in 1975 and 1979, when he was elevated to the bench as Judge of the Sindh High Court at Karachi.

From 1981 to 1984 he was the provincial Minister for Education, Culture, Sports and Law, Government of Sindh. Then he was Minister for Law, Local Bodies and Rural Development from 1984 to 1985. He retired from the Sindh High Court & re-entered politics. He was elected as member of the Provincial Assembly of Sindh and became leader of the house and Chief Minister of Sindh, Pakistan, from 1985 to 1988.

During this period, he helped raise the status of the university for Shah Abdul Latif Bhitai University in Khairpur Sindh which was previously a sub-campus of the University of Sindh. This provided a lot of employment opportunities and he succeeded in providing a network of roads in the Province as well in his electoral area Khairpur.

He was elected to the Parliament National Assembly of Pakistan in 1991 and became Defence Minister of Pakistan until 1993. He was again elected to the Provincial Assembly of Sindh as well as National Assembly of Pakistan in 1997 winning both the seats of the two houses. He resigned his Provincial Assembly seat and became the Minister for Education (Pakistan) until 1999. He was appointed Advisor to the Prime Minister of Pakistan for affairs of the province of Sindh with powers of the Chief Minister and Status of a Federal Minister in June 1999. He continued in this position until October 1999 when General Pervez Musharraf took over in the 1999 Pakistani coup d'état on 12 October 1999, overthrowing the constitutionally elected government.

Syed Ghous Ali Shah is the Provincial head of the PML-N Sindh and has been elected for another 3-year term from 2006 to 2009 as Party President of the Sindh Province. He has been elected in this position on numerous occasions since 1986.

It has been reported that Syed Ghous Ali Shah was one of the candidates considered by Pakistan Muslim League (N) for the position of President of Pakistan after the resignation of Pervez Musharraf in 2008.

In 2011, Ghous Ali Shah was living in Karachi and working with the PML (N) members to improve the party's condition in Sindh, while also touring the province heavily to see where he can build up the same power he had back in 1997 when the PMLN had formed the provincial government.

== Scouting ==
In 1993, he was awarded the Bronze Wolf, the highest distinction of the World Organization of the Scout Movement, by the World Scout Committee for exceptional services to world Scouting.

From 1988 to 1994 and 1998 to 2000, he was Chief Commissioner of the Pakistan Boy Scouts Association.

In 1992 he was elected as a member of the Asia-Pacific Scout Region committee until 1998.

He was also awarded the highest Scouting award, the Silver Tiger Award of Bangladesh Scouts, given to any world personality from Bangladesh in 1994. He was also awarded the highest Scouting award, the Silver Elephant of The Bharat Scouts and Guides of India, in 1998.

== Awards and recognition ==
In 1987, he wrote the 'Iqbal: Meeting Point of the East & West' lecture on Allama Iqbal which he delivered at the University of Heidelberg, Germany. He had received the Allama Iqbal Centenary Gold Medal for his works and articles about Allama Iqbal in 1979.

== Personal life ==
Syed Ghous Ali Shah went to London in October 2001 for medical treatment. He returned to Pakistan on 17 August 2008. His wife had died in 2007.

Syed Ghous Ali Shah has six children: Shabbir Hyder Shah, Ali Hyder Shah, Amir Hyder Shah (Late) & Syed Mohammad Safdar Hyder Shah alias Farhan Shah. He also has 2 married daughters.

Political offices
Preceded by Ghulam Mustafa Jatoi	Chief Minister of Sindh; 1985–1988	Succeeded by Akhtar Ali Kazi
Preceded by Benazir Bhutto	Defence Minister of Pakistan; 1991–1993	Succeeded by Aftab Shaban Mirani
