= Khairpur =

Khairpur خيرپور
- City
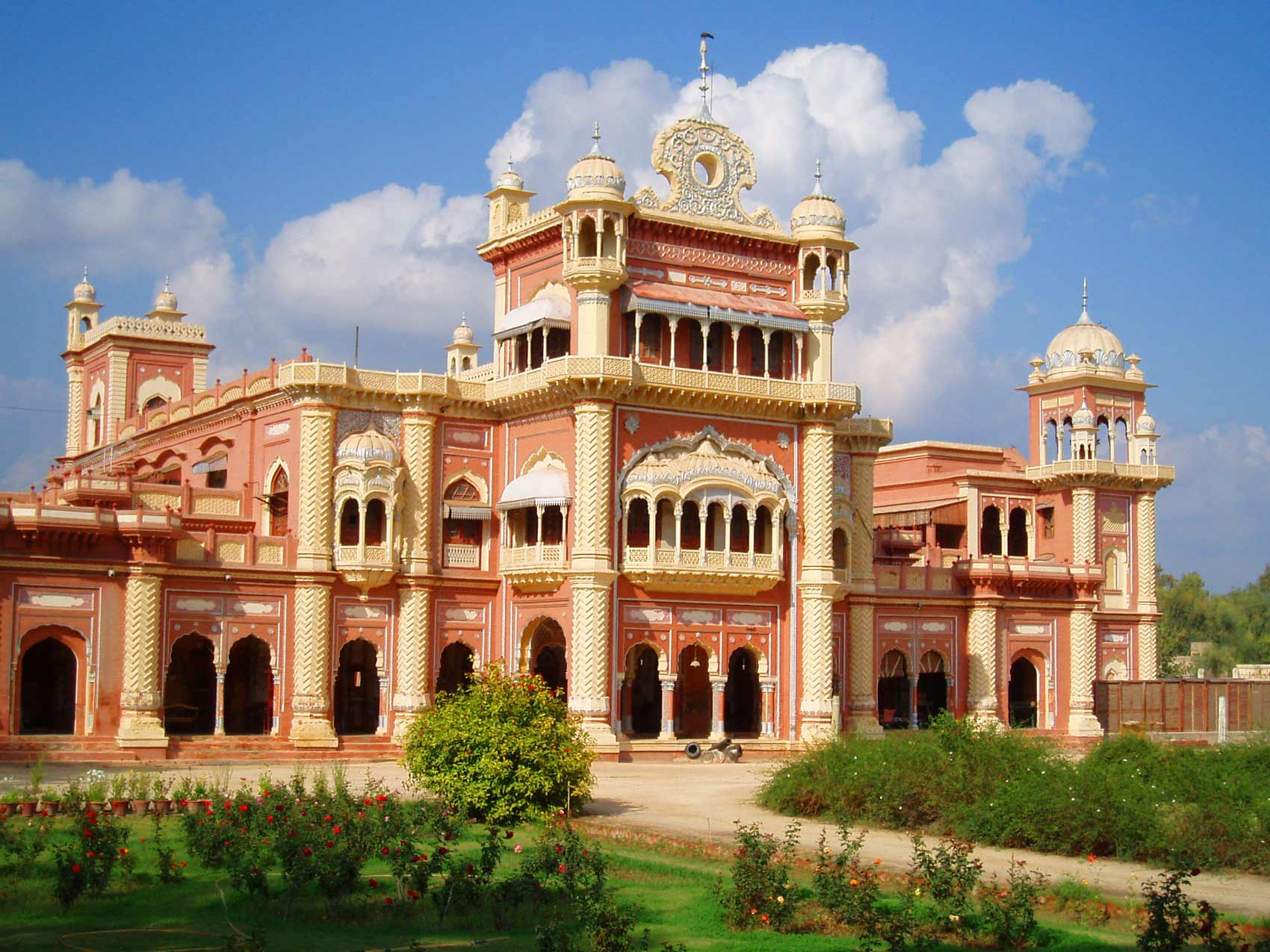
- Khairpur's Faiz Mahal

- Location within Sindh Location within Pakistan
- Coordinates: 27°32′N 68°46′E
- Country: Pakistan
- Province: Sindh
- Division: Sukkur
- District: Khairpur
- Established: 24 October 1955

Government
  - Type: Municipal Corporation
  - Mayor: Shiraz Shaukat Rajpar, (PPP)
  - Deputy Commissioner: Altaf Ahmed Chachar (BPS-19 PAS)
  - District Police Officer (DPO): Capt (R) Ameer Saud Magsi (BPS-19 PSP)

Population (2023)
  - City: 191,044
  - Rank: 56th, Pakistan
- Time zone: UTC+5 (PST)

Khairpur (Urdu: خيرپور, Sindhi: خيرپور) is a city and the capital of the Khairpur Mirs District of Pakistan's Sindh province.

== History ==
The Talpur dynasty was established in 1783 by Mir Fateh Ali Khan, who declared himself the first Rais, or ruler of Sindh, after defeating the Kalhoras at the Battle of Halani.

The death of Mir Sohrab Khan Talpur, founder of the Khairpur branch abdicated power to his eldest son Mir Rustam Ali Khan, in 1811.

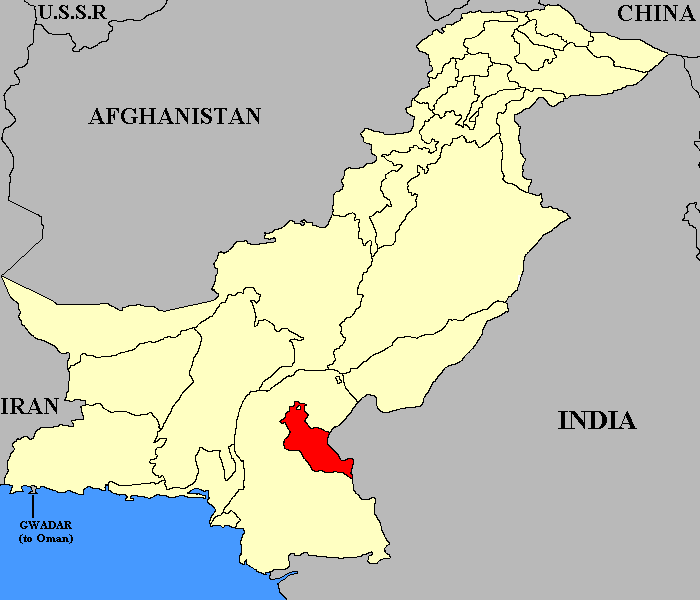
Khairpur State (marked in red) joined Pakistan as a princely state in 1947

Rustam ruled until 1842, when he abdicated in favor of his youngest brother Mir Ali Murad. Ali Murad helped the British in 1845-7 during the Turki campaign, but was later accused of plotting against the British in 1851–2, and so was stripped of his lands in upper Sindh by the British East India Company. As a result, the remaining land under his control consisted mostly of Khairpur city, and its immediate environs. During the 1857 Sepoy Mutiny, Ali Murad sided with the British, and prevented rebels from seizing the Shikarpur jail and treasury. He regained the favour of the British, and in 1866, the British promised to recognize any future successors as rightful rulers of Khairpur.

Ali Murad's eldest son had predeceased him, and so he was succeeded by his second son, Mir Faiz Muhammad Khan, who ruled until his death 1909. He was in turn succeeded by his son, Mir Imam Bakhsh Khan Talpur, who aided the British war effort during World War I, and was thus awarded the honorary title Lieutenant Colonel in 1918. He died in 1921, and was succeeded by Mir Ali Nawaz Khan. Under his rule, the feudal Cherr system of forced labour was abolished, while new canals were laid for irrigation.

== Geography ==
Khairpur district is located in north-eastern Sindh and is bounded on the north by Shikarpur and Sukkur, on the east by India, on the south by Sanghar district and Shaheed Benzeerabad and on the west by Larkana and Noshero Feroz. The district lies from 680 10’ to 700 10’ east longitude and 260 9’ to 270 42’ north Latitude.

== Politics ==
Politically, the city of Khairpur have been dominated by the Pakistan People's Party (PPP) since the era of 1970s. Excluding the exceptional occasions, where other parties had also left mark of their victory now or then but more or less the city have been represented by the MNAs belonging PPP in the Provincial and National Assembly.

=== The National Assembly ===
The city is represented by the 1 MNA in the federal legislature since the remapping of the constituencies during 2023 Elections.

Member of National Assembly (MNAs)	Constituency	Year	Party
Nafeesa Shah	NA-208 Khairpur-I	2023	PPP

=== The Provincial Assembly ===
Member of Provincial Assembly (MPA)	Constituency	Year	Party
Syed Qaim Ali Shah	PS-26 Khairpur-I	2023	PPP

== Climate ==
Khairpur has a hot arid climate (Köppen BWh), characterised by extremely hot and hazy summers with warm winters. Khairpur is known for its extremely hot summers, and was described as the hottest city in British India. Wind speed is low throughout the year, and sunshine is abundant. Summer temperatures regularly surpass 50 °C (122 °F). Dry heat is experienced starting from April to early June until the monsoon starts to arrive. The monsoon in Khairpur produces rain only infrequently, but brings high dew points, resulting in high heat indices. The monsoon recedes by September, but it is not until late October that the short lived autumn season is experienced before the onset of the region's cool winters. The average annual rainfall of Khairpur is 87.6 millimetres or 3.4 inches and mainly occurs in the monsoon season. The highest annual rainfall ever is 375 millimetres or 14.8 inches, recorded in 1978 and the lowest annual rainfall ever is none at all in 1941.

Climate data for Khairpur
Month	Jan	Feb	Mar	Apr	May	Jun	Jul	Aug	Sep	Oct	Nov	Dec	Year
Record high °C (°F)	31.0 (87.8)	38.0 (100.4)	45.0 (113.0)	49.0 (120.2)	50.5 (122.9)	50.5 (122.9)	46.5 (115.7)	44.5 (112.1)	43.5 (110.3)	41.6 (106.9)	37.2 (99.0)	31.0 (87.8)	50.5 (122.9)
Mean daily maximum °C (°F)	24.8 (76.6)	26.2 (79.2)	32.4 (90.3)	39.2 (102.6)	43.3 (109.9)	43.2 (109.8)	41.0 (105.8)	39.1 (102.4)	37.9 (100.2)	35.6 (96.1)	30.3 (86.5)	24.8 (76.6)	34.8 (94.7)
Daily mean °C (°F)	16.5 (61.7)	18.2 (64.8)	23.9 (75.0)	30.1 (86.2)	34.6 (94.3)	35.7 (96.3)	34.7 (94.5)	33.2 (91.8)	31.4 (88.5)	27.8 (82.0)	21.7 (71.1)	16.5 (61.7)	27.0 (80.7)
Mean daily minimum °C (°F)	8.3 (46.9)	10.2 (50.4)	15.4 (59.7)	21.1 (70.0)	25.9 (78.6)	28.3 (82.9)	28.4 (83.1)	27.3 (81.1)	24.9 (76.8)	20.0 (68.0)	13.2 (55.8)	8.3 (46.9)	19.3 (66.7)
Record low °C (°F)	1.0 (33.8)	0.5 (32.9)	3.0 (37.4)	9.5 (49.1)	16.5 (61.7)	19.5 (67.1)	20.8 (69.4)	17.5 (63.5)	19.5 (67.1)	12.4 (54.3)	5.0 (41.0)	−1.5 (29.3)	−1.5 (29.3)
Average rainfall mm (inches)	3.5 (0.14)	7.0 (0.28)	6.8 (0.27)	5.7 (0.22)	5.0 (0.20)	4.5 (0.18)	20.8 (0.82)	20.4 (0.80)	0.9 (0.04)	3.0 (0.12)	0.6 (0.02)	9.4 (0.37)	87.6 (3.46)
Average rainy days	0.3	0.6	0.8	0.4	0.4	0.5	2.0	0.6	0.1	0.1	0.1	0.3	6.2
Average relative humidity (%)	52	48	39	28	29	38	49	56	52	46	47	52	45
Mean monthly sunshine hours	276	294	318	345	363	372	357	336	321	309	288	276	3,855
Source 1: PMD (1991–2020)
Source 2: climate-data

== Demographics ==
Population

Historical population
Year	Pop.	±% p.a.
1951	18,184	—
1961	34,144	+6.50%
1972	48,299	+3.20%
1981	61,447	+2.71%
1998	105,637	+3.24%
2017	183,181	+2.94%
2023	191,044	+0.70%

According to 2023 census, Khairpur had a population of 191,044. At the 1998 census, the population of the city of Khairpur was 102,188 having increased from 61,447 at the 1981 census. The city had an estimated population of 127,857 in 2006.

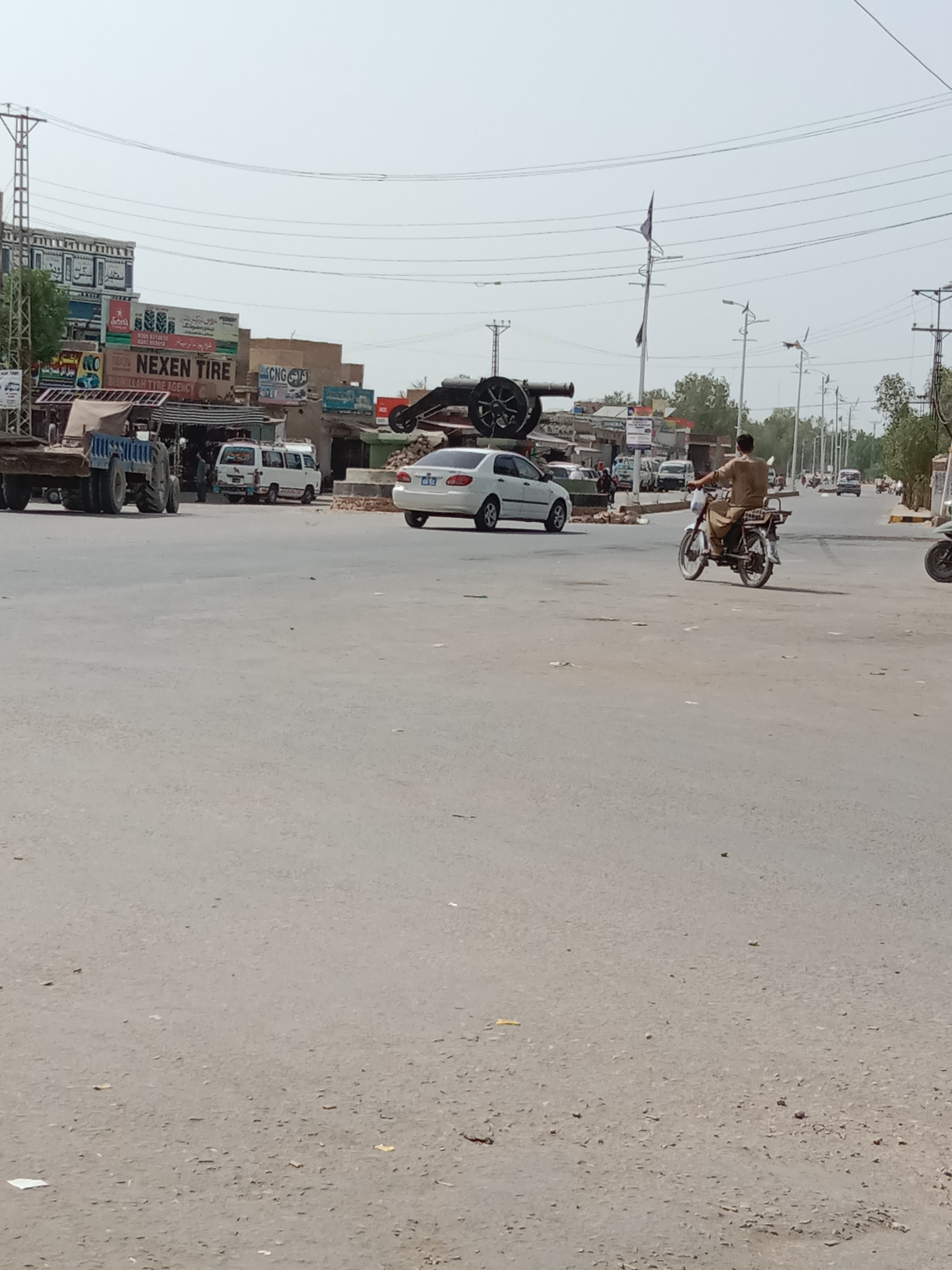
مريم توب چوڪ خيرپور

== Languages ==
Urban Population of Khairpur Taluka (2023)
1. Sindhi (95.2%)
2. Urdu (2.62%)
3. Others (2.17%)

According to 2023 Pakistani census around 95.21%of the population spoke Sindhi, 2.62% Urdu, an additional 2.17% percent spoke a multitude of languages (mostly Punjabi, Balochi and Saraiki). (Note: Language Data taken from the Urban Population of Khairpur Taluka, it corresponds with Khairpur MC and Therhi TC borders and population)

== Education ==
There are following Colleges and Universities in Khairpur

- Khairpur Medical College KMC, Khairpur Mirs
- Pir Abdul Qadir Shah Jeelani Institute of Medical Sciences, Khairpur Mirs
- Shah Abdul Latif University, Khairpur Mirs
- IBA-Institute of Emerging Technologies, SIBAU Campus Khairpur
- Mehran University College Of Engineering And Technology SZAB Campus Khairpur,
- The Benazir Bhutto Shaheed University of Technology & Skill Development, Khairpur Mirs,
- Khairpur College of Agricultural Engineering and Technology (KCAET) at Khairpur,
- Pak-Turk Maarif International Schools and Colleges Khairpur Campus ,
- IBA Community College Khairpur ,
- Superior Science College Khairpur Mirs ,
- Khairpur Women College Khairpur ,

Government Comprehensive Higher Secondary School Khairpur ,

== See also ==
- Khairpur District
- Khairpur (princely state)
- Sindh
- Gambat
- Thari Mirwah
- Rasoolabad
- Piryaloi
- Kingri
