= Khairpur District =

District in Sindh, Pakistan

Khairpur District: خيرپور ضلعو; ضلع خیرپور
- District of Sindh
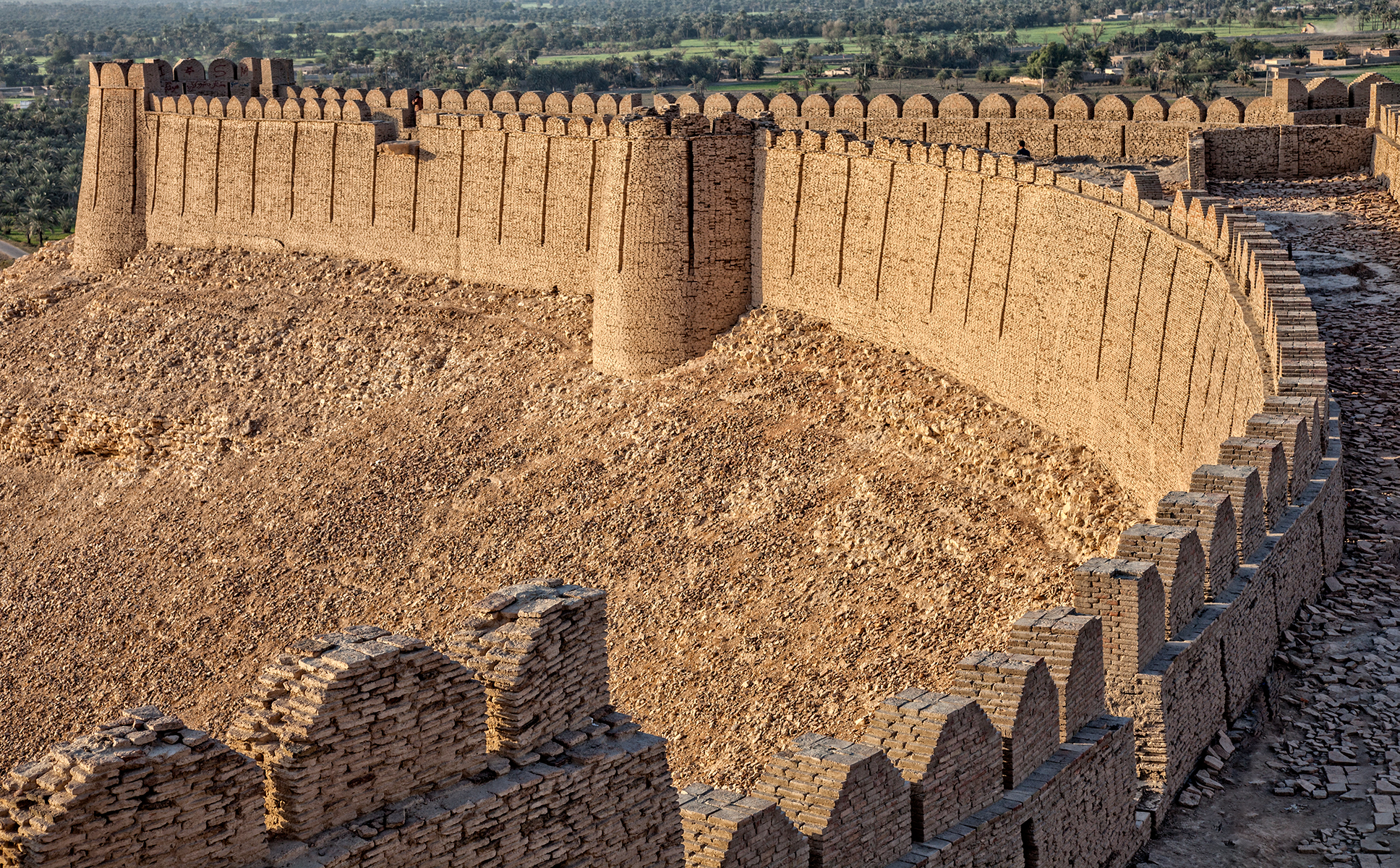
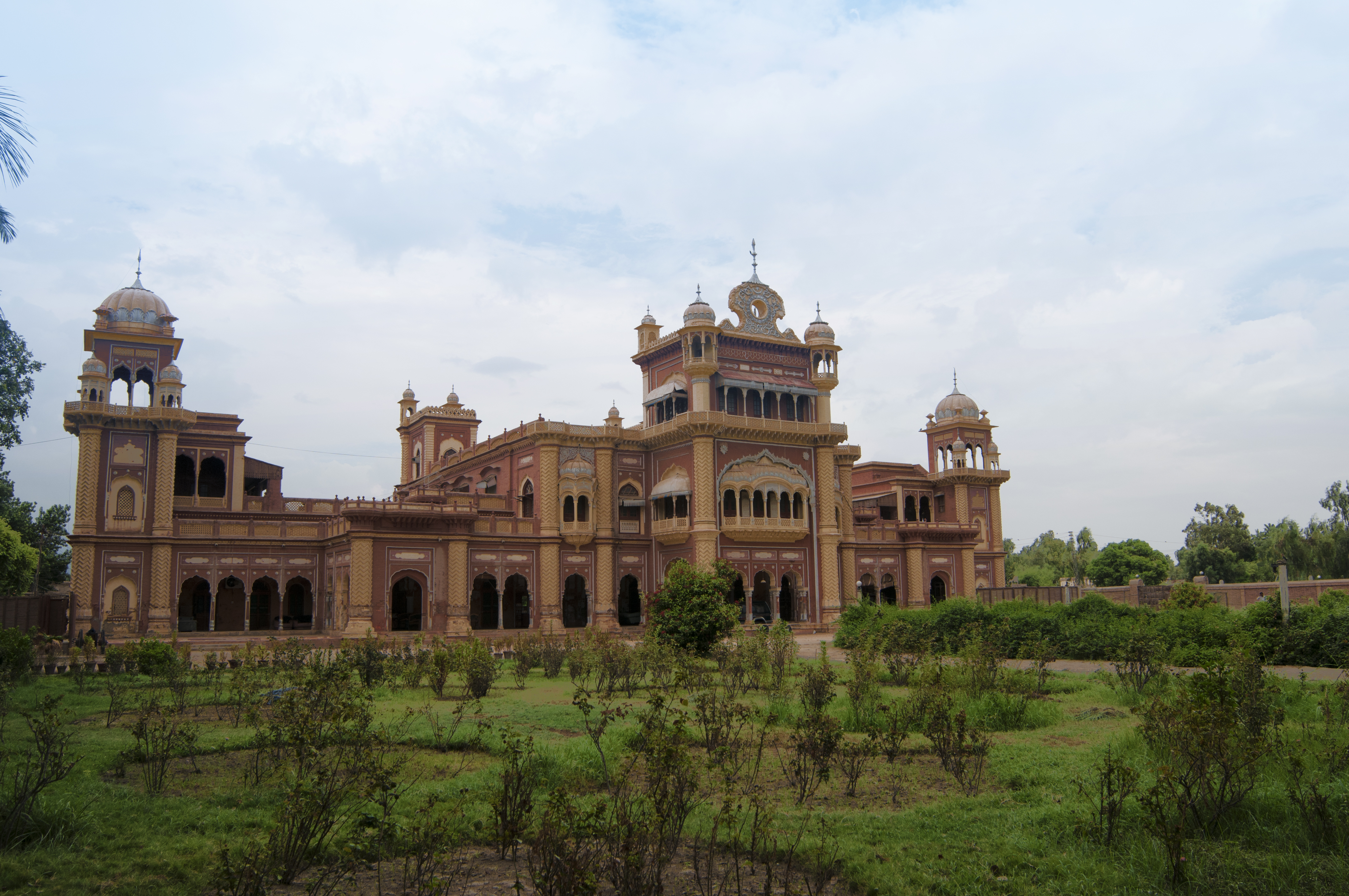
- Top: Kot Diji Fort; Bottom: Faiz Mahal

- Coordinates: 27°32′N 68°46′E
- Country: Pakistan
- Province: Sindh
- Division: Sukkur
- Established: 15 October 1955
- Headquarters: Khairpur

Government
  - Type: District Administration
  - Deputy Commissioner: Altaf Ahmed Chachar (BPS-19 PAS)
  - District Police Officer: Capt (R) Ameer Saud Magsi (BPS-19 PSP)
  - District Health Officer: N/A

Area
  - District of Sindh: 15,910 km^{2} (6,140 sq mi)

Population (2023 Pakistani census)
  - District of Sindh: 2,597,535
  - Rank: 5th:Sindh
  - Density: 163.3/km^{2} (423/sq mi)
  - Urban: 844,263 (32.49%)
  - Rural: 1,753,272 (67.51%)
- Demonym: Khairpuri

Literacy
  - Literacy rate: Total: 50.14%; Male: 61.84%; Female: 38.10%
- Time zone: UTC+5 (PKT)
  - Summer (DST): UTC+5
- Calling code: 0243
- Number of Tehsils: 8
- Number of Union Councils: 89

Khairpur District (Sindhi: خيرپور ضلعو, Urdu: ضلع خیرپور) is a district in the Pakistani province of Sindh in Sukkur Division.

At the 2017 census, it was the fifth most populated district in the province after four districts of Karachi city, with 2.4 million inhabitants. The headquarters of the district is the city of Khairpur. The district is further divided into eight sub-districts: Khairpur Tehsil, Mirwah Tehsil, Kot Diji Tehsil, Kingri Tehsil, Sobho Dero Tehsil, Gambat Tehsil, Faiz Ganj Tehsil and Nara Tehsil.

== Location ==
Khairpur district is located between middle and northern Sindh. It is bounded on the north by Shikarpur District and Sukkur District, on the east by India, on the south by Sanghar District and Nawabshah District, and on the west by Larkana District, Naushahro Feroze District and Indus River. The revised area of the district is 15,910 km^{2}.

== Demographics ==
Historical population
Year	Pop.	±% p.a.
1951	347,068	—
1961	500,258	+3.72%
1972	724,935	+3.43%
1981	981,190	+3.42%
1998	1,546,587	+2.71%
2017	2,405,190	+2.35%
2023	2,597,535	+1.29%

Religions in Khairpur district (2023)
Religion	Percent
Islam	96.78%
Hinduism	2.90%
Other or not stated	0.32%

As of the 2023 census, Khairpur district has 452,250 households and a population of 2,597,535. The district has a sex ratio of 102.69 males to 100 females and a literacy rate of 50.14%: 61.84% for males and 38.10% for females. 891,260 (34.31% of the surveyed population) are under 10 years of age. 844,263 (32.50%) live in urban areas.

Religion in present-day Khairpur district
Religion	1941 (Note: 1941 figures are for Khairpur State, which roughly correspond to the present district.)		2017		2023	
Religion	Pop.	%	Pop.	%	Pop.	%
Islam	253,690	82.96%	2,336,821	97.16%	2,513,753	96.78%
Hinduism	49,604	16.22%	66,489	2.76%	75,407	2.90%
Sikhism	1,616	0.53%	—N/a	—N/a	28	~0%
Others (Note: Including Jainism, Christianity, Buddhism, Zoroastrianism, Judaism, Ad-Dharmis, or not stated)	877	0.29%	1,880	0.08%	7,951	0.32%
Total Population	305,787	100%	2,405,190	100%	2,597,448	100%

The majority religion is Islam, as indicated by 96.78% of the population. Hinduism is practiced by 2.90% of the population, including those from Scheduled Castes.

Sindhi was the predominant language, spoken by 97.73% of the population as their first language.

== Politics ==
=== The National Assembly. ===
The District of Khairpur is mapped into three constituencies at the national level. The constituencies include NA-208 Khairpur-I, NA-209 Khairpur-II, and NA-210 Khairpur-III.

Following is the list of the Member National Assemblies(MNAs) representing district in the National Assembly of Pakistan.

Member of National Assembly	Constituency	Party	Election Year
Syed Nafisa Shah	NA-208 Khairpur-I	PPP	2018
Syed Javed Shah	NA-209 Khairpur-II	PPP	2018
Syed Fazal Shah	NA-210 Khairpur-III	PPP	2018

=== The Provincial Assembly ===
The District of Khairpur is represented by the seven constituencies in the Provincial Assembly of Sindh.

Member of Provincial Assembly	Constituency	Party	Year
Syed Qaim Ali Shah	PS-26 Khairpur-I	PPP	2018
Munawar Wassan	PS-27 Khairpur-II	PPP	2018
Sajid Banbhan	PS-28 Khairpur-III	PPP	2018
Muhammad Rafique Banbhan	PS-29 Khairpur-IV	GDA	2018
Syed Fazal Ali Shah	PS-30 Khairpur-V	PPP	2018
Naeem Ahmed Kharal	PS-31 Khairpur-VI	PPP	2018
Syed Rashid Shah Rashidi	PS-32 Khairpur-VII	GDA	2018

== Administration ==
It has 8 tehsils, 76 Union councils, 11 towns, 6800 Villages and total population 1,546,587 (Male 810,448 and Female Population 736,139) according to (Census) 1998.

The eight tehsils of the district are:

- Faiz Ganj Tehsil
- Gambat Tehsil
- Khairpur Tehsil
- Kingri Tehsil
- Kot Diji Tehsil
- Nara Tehsil
- Sobho Dero Tehsil
- Thari Mirwah Tehsil

== People from Khairpur District ==
- Pir Pagaro – President of Pakistan Muslim League (F)
- Sachal Sarmast – eighteenth-Century Sufi Poet
- Qaim Ali Shah – former Chief Minister of Sindh Province
- Ghous Ali Shah – former Defense Minister of Pakistan and Former Chief Minister of Sindh province
- Mir Ali Murad Talpur – former ruler of the princely state of Khairpur

== See also ==
- Divisions of Pakistan
  - Divisions of Balochistan
  - Divisions of Khyber Pakhtunkhwa
  - Divisions of Punjab
  - Divisions of Sindh
  - Divisions of Azad Kashmir
  - Divisions of Gilgit-Baltistan
- Tehsils of Pakistan
  - Tehsils of Punjab, Pakistan
  - Tehsils of Khyber Pakhtunkhwa, Pakistan
  - Tehsils of Balochistan, Pakistan
  - Tehsils of Sindh, Pakistan
  - Tehsils of Azad Kashmir
  - Tehsils of Gilgit-Baltistan
- Districts of Pakistan
  - Districts of Khyber Pakhtunkhwa, Pakistan
  - Districts of Punjab, Pakistan
  - Districts of Balochistan, Pakistan
  - Districts of Sindh, Pakistan
  - Districts of Azad Kashmir
  - Districts of Gilgit-Baltistan

== Sources ==
- 1998 District census report of Khairpur. Census publication. Vol. 86. Islamabad: Population Census Organization, Statistics Division, Government of Pakistan. 2000.
