= Second Murad Ali Shah ministry =

Incumbent Government of Sindh

Second Murad Ali Shah Ministry
- 52nd Cabinet of Sindh

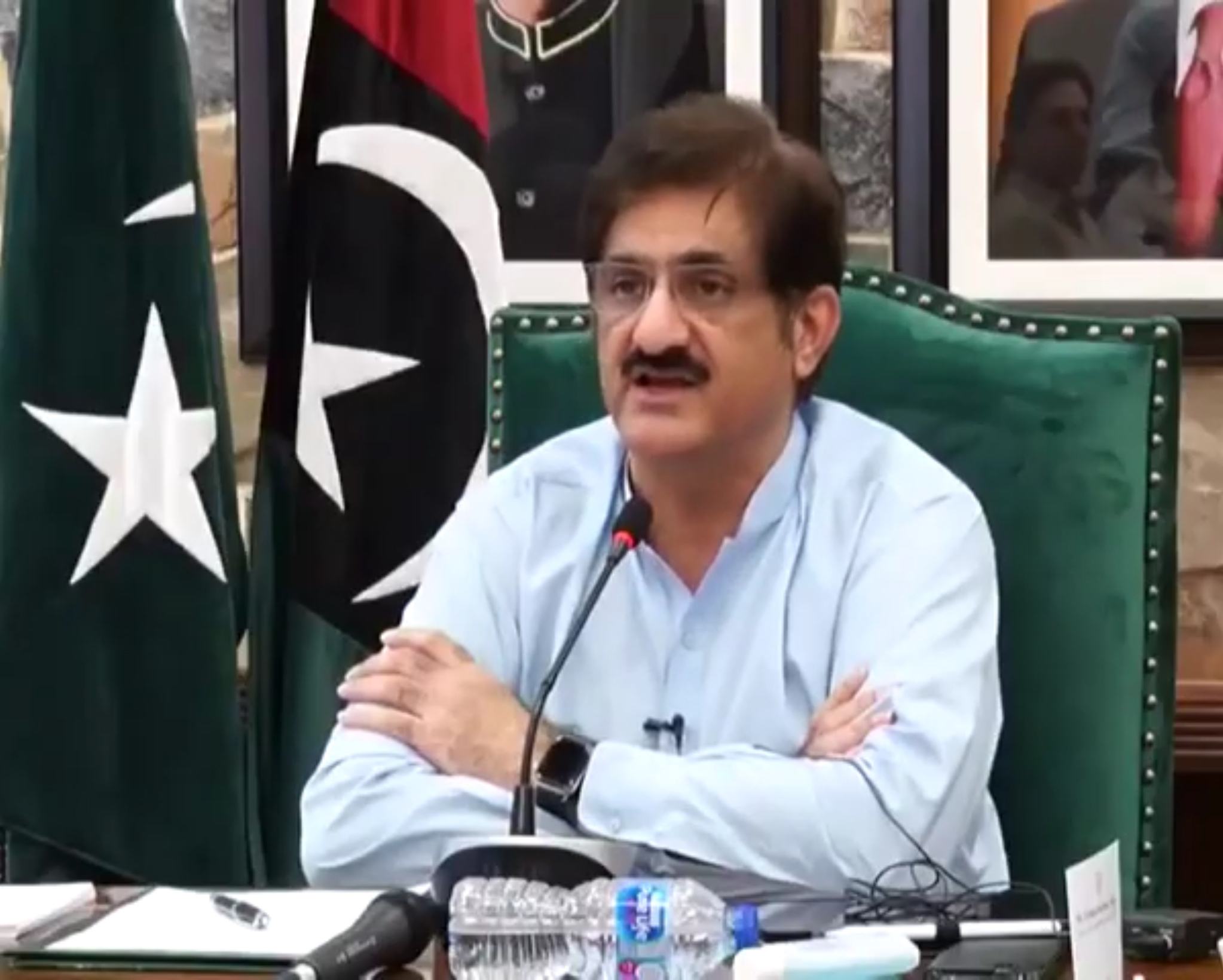
- Date formed: 12 March 2024

People and organisations
- Governor: Nehal Hashmi
- Chief Minister: Murad Ali Shah
- Member party: PPP; MQM-P; MQM-L; PMLN; IPP; ANP; JUP-N PTI-P; BAP; PML(Q); PML(Z); NP; IND; PSP ITP BPP PART
- Status in legislature: 118 / 168
- Opposition party: SIC; JIP; GDA; TLP; STP; MWM; PRHP; PTI; AP; SUP; JUI (F); MQM-H; ST
- Opposition leader: Saeed Ahmad Afridi

History
- Election: 2024 Sindh provincial election
- Predecessor: First Murad Ali Shah Ministry

The Second Murad Ali Shah Ministry is the current provincial government of Sindh, Pakistan, led by Chief Minister Murad Ali Shah.

== Formation ==
The Chief Minister position was established after Syed Murad Ali Shah was elected as the Provincial Chief Minister of Sindh for the third consecutive time with an overwhelming majority in the 2024 Sindh provincial election. PPP's ally, the MQM-P opted to stay in the opposition and not join the government. The majority was contested by PTI, JI, JUI-F and GDA who alleged the ruling PPP had rigged the elections in Karachi and other areas of Sindh to gain a false majority. Subsequently, protest broke out in Sindh against the Second Murad Ali Shah ministry alleging it had rigged the election.

== Members ==
The cabinet took oath in a phased manner. In the first phase, the 12-member Sindh Cabinet took oath.

Sindh Cabinet under Syed Murad Ali Shah
Sr. No.	Name	Portfolio	Assumed office	Party
Chief Minister
1	Murad Ali Shah	Government of Sindh	27 February 2024	PPP
Ministers
2	Sharjeel Memon	1. Department of Excise, Taxation and Narcotics; 2. Department of Transport and Mass Transit	12 March 2024	PPP
3	Azra Fazal Pechuho	Sindh Health Department	12 March 2024	PPP
4	Nasir Hussain Shah	1. Planning and Development; 2. Department of Energy	12 March 2024	PPP
5	Syed Sardar Ali Shah	1. Department of College Education; 2. Sindh Education and Literacy Department; 3. Department of Mines and Minerals Development	12 March 2024	PPP
6	Saeed Ghani	1. Public Health Engineering and Rural Development; 2. Local Government and Housing Town Planning Department.	12 March 2024	PPP
7	Jam Khan Shoro	Irrigation and Food Department	12 March 2024	PPP
8	Zia Ul Hassan Lanjar	Parliamentary Affairs, Interior and Law, and Criminal Prosecution	12 March 2024	PPP
9	Sardar Muhammad Bakhsh Khan Mahar	Supply and Prize, Agriculture, Sports and Youth Affairs, Inquiries, and Anti-Corruption Establishment	12 March 2024	PPP
10	Ali Hassan Zardari	Prisons	12 March 2024	PPP
