= Coastal Development Authority =

Coastal Development Authority could refer to:

- Karnataka Coastal Development Authority
- Balochistan Coastal Development Authority
- Sindh Coastal Development Authority
