= 2025 Herat road crash =

Road accident in Afghanistan

- Location of Herat Province within Afghanistan

Details
- Date: 19 August 2025 c. 8:30 p.m. AFT (UTC+04:30)
- Location: Guzara District, Herat Province, Afghanistan
- Coordinates: 34°10′21″N 62°04′57″E
- Incident type: Head-on and multi-vehicle collision (bus, motorcycle and truck)
- Cause: Under investigation; excessive speed of the overcrowded bus (according to police)

Statistics
- Bus: Type "580"
- Vehicles: 3
- Passengers: Unknown (deported Afghans from Iran)
- Deaths: At least 79
- Injured: 2

On 19 August 2025, a passenger bus carrying deported migrants from Iran caught fire after it collided with a motorcycle and a fuel truck and veered off a road in Guzara District, Herat Province, Afghanistan, killing at least 79 people, including 19 children, and injuring two others. It was one of the country's deadliest road crashes of the decade.

== Background ==
=== Road transport in Afghanistan ===
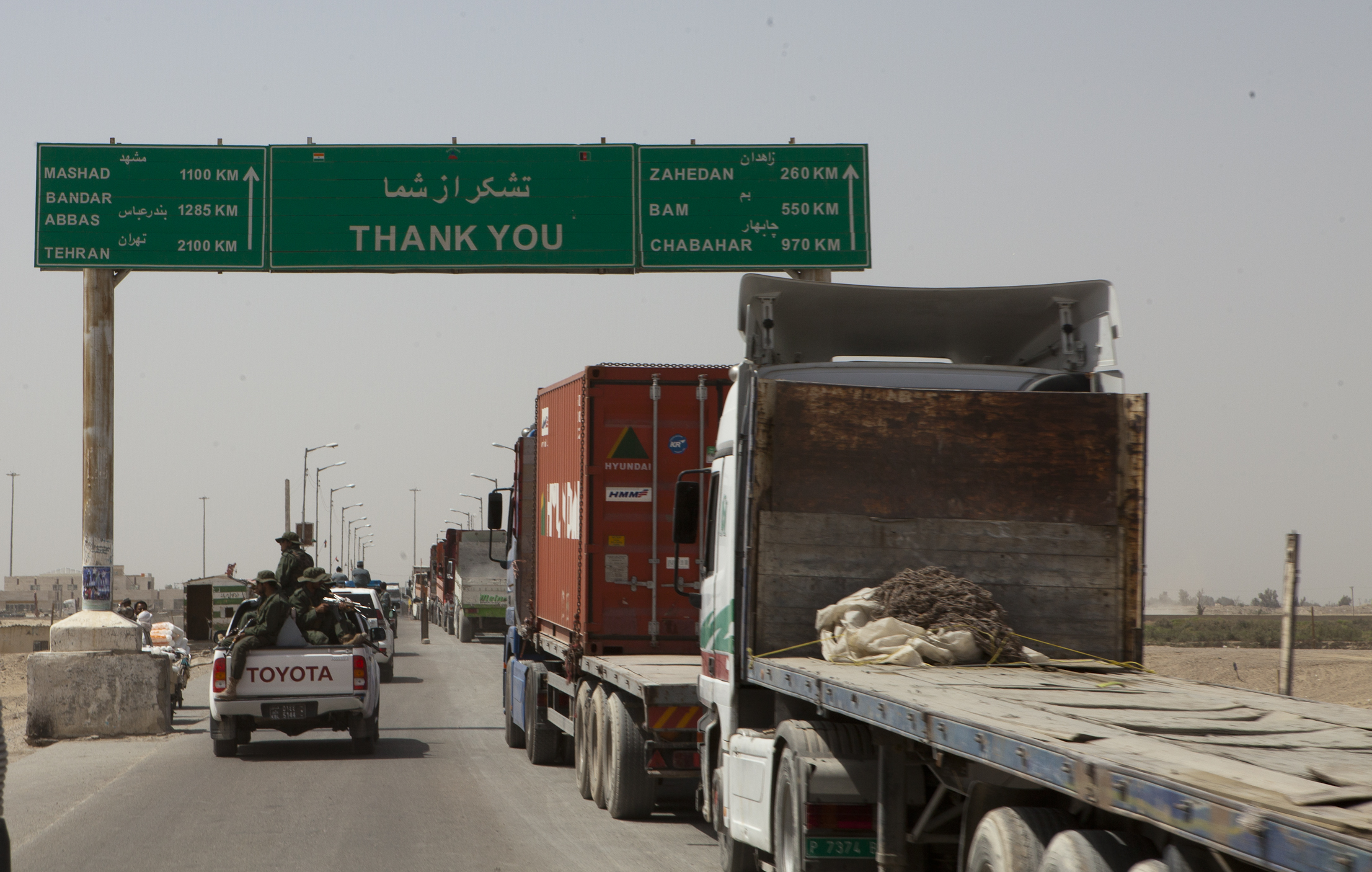
Highway connecting Iran with Afghanistan

Traffic accidents are common in Afghanistan, primarily due to poor road conditions after decades of ongoing internal conflict, driver carelessness, and lack of regulation. In late 2022, a tanker caught fire after overturning in the Salang Pass, causing 31 fatalities; in December 2023, two separate bus collisions involving tankers killed 52 people; in March 2024, another 20 died in a crash in Helmand Province; in December 2024, two highway accidents in the southeast of the country killed a total of 50 people and injured 76. In addition, the Herat–Islam Qala highway, an extension of the Afghanistan Ring Road where the collision happened, is considered one of the country's most dangerous routes.

On 27 August, eight days later, a passenger bus overturned in Arghandi, Kabul, causing 25 fatalities and injuring 27 others.

On 1 September, almost two weeks later, an overcrowded car also overturned in Aqcha District, Jowzjan Province, killing eight people and injuring four others.

=== Mass deportation of Afghans from Iran ===
About 1.8 million Afghans have been forcibly expelled from Iran in 2025, with an additional 184,459 deported from Pakistan and over 5,000 from Turkey since the start of the year. Around 10,000 Afghan prisoners, mostly from Pakistan, have also been repatriated. The bus was traveling to the capital Kabul as part of a large-scale operation to remove Afghans from Iran initiated after the Twelve-Day War in June. The crash took place a day after Iranian Minister of Interior Eskandar Momeni announced that 800,000 more people would have to leave the country by next March.

A United Nations report issued in July related that some returnees face "serious human rights violations", including "torture, ill-treatment, arbitrary arrest and detention, and threats to personal security." The Taliban, which has ruled the country since seizing power in August 2021, denied the allegations.

== Crash ==
At approximately 8:30 p.m. AFT, an overloaded passenger bus veered after bumping into a motorbike and collided head-on with a Mazda truck that was possibly carrying fuel barrels. The bus veered off the road and caused an extensive fire. Eyewitness accounts stated bystanders tried using soil to extinguish flames from the bus's engine before firefighters arrived. Seventy-seven people died at the scene, with two others succumbing to their injuries, bringing the death toll to 79. Several bodies were burned beyond recognition. Haji Mohammad Janan Moqadas, the chief physician at the al-Farooq Army Corps hospital, said the only way to identify the bodies was through the list of passengers provided by the Department of Migrants. Another witness saw three people escape the bus with their clothes burnt. Most of the fatalities occurred among passengers on the bus, although two individuals in the truck and two others on the motorcycle were also killed.

Local police stated that the accident was due to the "high speed and negligence" of the bus and that all the passengers embarked in Islam Qala, an Afghan town near the Afghanistan–Iran border.

== Aftermath ==
Firefighters and cleanup crews worked in the early hours of the following day to extinguish the flames and clear the charred wreckage of the vehicles.

The Taliban-controlled government of Afghanistan ordered an investigation. Deputy Minister of Public and Strategic Relations and head of Herat's Information and Culture Department Ahmadullah Muttaqi said in a post on X that authorities are committed to a "thorough inquiry" into the crash and planned to transfer the bodies of the victims, residents of Kabul, Kapisa, Baghlan, Kunduz, Parwan, Maidan Wardak, Ghazni and Bamyan provinces, to Kabul's central hospital for identification and handover to their families. On 20 August, the Taliban said it had arrested the head of the transportation business involved in the collision.

== See also ==
- List of traffic collisions (2000–present)
- Afghanistan–Iran relations
