= Nasir Hussain Shah =

Pakistani politician

Syed Nasir Hussain Shah
- سيد ناصر حسين شاھ

Provincial Minister of Sindh for Energy
- Incumbent
- Assumed office 12 March 2024
- Governor: Kamran Tessori; Nehal Hashmi
- Chief Minister: Murad Ali Shah

Provincial Minister of Sindh for Planning and Development
- Incumbent
- Assumed office 12 March 2024
- Governor: Kamran Tessori; Nehal Hashmi
- Chief Minister: Murad Ali Shah

Provincial Minister of Sindh for Local Governments
- In office 5 August 2019 – 11 August 2023
- Governor: Imran Ismail; Kamran Tessori
- Chief Minister: Murad Ali Shah

Provincial Minister of Sindh for Forests and Wildlife
- In office 5 August 2019 – 11 August 2023
- Governor: Imran Ismail; Kamran Tessori
- Chief Minister: Murad Ali Shah

Provincial Minister of Sindh for Religious Affairs
- In office 5 August 2019 – 11 August 2023
- Governor: Imran Ismail; Kamran Tessori
- Chief Minister: Murad Ali Shah

Provincial Minister of Sindh for Housing and Town Planning
- In office 5 September 2018 – 11 August 2023
- Governor: Imran Ismail; Kamran Tessori
- Chief Minister: Murad Ali Shah

Provincial Minister of Sindh for Information and Archives
- In office 3 February 2020 – 5 August 2021
- Governor: Imran Ismail; Kamran Tessori
- Chief Minister: Murad Ali Shah
- Preceded by: Saeed Ghani
- Succeeded by: Saeed Ghani

Member of the Provincial Assembly of Sindh
- In office 13 August 2018 – 11 August 2023
- Constituency: PS-25 (Sukkur-IV)
- In office 29 May 2013 – 28 May 2018
- Constituency: PS-2 (Sukkur-II)
- In office 2008–2013
- Constituency: (Sukkur)
- In office 1997–1999
- Constituency: (Sukkur)

District Nazim Sukkur (Mayor)
- In office 2005–2008
- In office 2001–2005
- Constituency: Sukkur

Personal details
- Party: PPP (1997-present)

Syed Nasir Hussain Shah (Sindhi: سيد ناصر حسين شاھ) is a Pakistani politician who held the office of Provincial Minister at the Government of Sindh for Local Government, Forests and Religious Affairs. He had previously been Sindh's Provincial Minister for Works and Services from 5 September 2018 to August 2019. He was also a Member of the Provincial Assembly of Sindh from May 2013 to May 2018.

== Early life and education ==
He was born on 10 November 1961.

He received a degree of Master of Arts in political science from Shah Abdul Latif University.

== Political career ==
He was elected to the Provincial Assembly of Sindh as a candidate of Pakistan Peoples Party (PPP) from Constituency PS-2 (Sukkur-II) in the 2013 Pakistani general election.

In May 2018, a petition was filed against him in the Sindh High Court to disqualify him from holding any public office and to bar him from contesting the 2018 Pakistani general election on the grounds that he holds work permit of the UAE.

He was re-elected to Provincial Assembly of Sindh as a candidate of PPP from Constituency PS-25 (Sukkur-IV) in the 2018 general election.

On 5 September 2018, he was inducted into the provincial Sindh cabinet of Chief Minister Syed Murad Ali Shah and was appointed as Provincial Minister of Sindh for works and services.

On 5 August 2019, he was appointed Provincial Minister of Sindh for Local Government, Forests and Religious Affairs.

On 12 March 2024 he was appointed as the Minister for Energy and Planning and Development for Sindh.
