= Sindh Premier League =

Twenty20 Cricket League based in Sindh

- Countries: Pakistan: Sindh
- Format: T20
- First edition: 2024
- Number of teams: 6
- Website: www.spl20.com
- 2024 Sindh Premier League

Sindh Premier League (Sindhi: سنڌ پريميئر ليگ; Urdu: سندھ پریمیئر لیگ; abbreviated as SPL) is a professional Twenty20 cricket league contested by six teams representing six cities of Sindh province in Pakistan. It was launched in 2023.

== History ==
=== Establishment ===
In June 2022, Syed Nasir Hussain Shah, the provincial minister of local government in an effort to promote and develop cricket in Sindh, announced that there would be a domestic cricket team for Sindh soon inspired by the Kashmiri counterpart. In March of the next year, a launching ceremony for the team was held in the auditorium of Sindh Assembly and the guests included Shahid Afridi and Abdul Razzaq. The first season of the league will be played in Karachi. In the same month of March the league was officially launched and finalized. The launch ceremony was inaugurated by the Chief Minister of Sindh in Karachi and attended by dignitaries including the provincial ministers Sharjeel Memon and Saeed Ghani, Advisor Law Barrister Murtaza Wahab, and former captain of Pakistan cricket team Sarfraz Ahmed. Former Pakistani cricketer Shahid Afridi announced to be the league's first brand ambassador.

The league is said to commence from September 19, 2023.

== Teams ==
There were originally seven teams consisting the league.

Team	City	Founded
Karachi Ghazis	Karachi	2023
Hyderabad Bahadurs	Hyderabad	2023
Sukkur Patriots	Sukkur	2023
Larkana Challengers	Larkana	2023
Benazirabad Lals	Benazirabad	2023
Mirpurkhaas Tigers	Mirpurkhas	2023
Khairpur Royals_{(squad not announced)}	Khairpur	2023

== Broadcasting ==
The league is set to be broadcast on its official YouTube channel.

== Criticism ==
The league came under severe criticism for not having sufficient presence of Sindhi players. Several journalists noted that the league was intended to promote Sindhi players but majority of the team squads did not have any Sindhi players. A journalist also pointed out that Mirpurkhaas Tigers did not have a single player that belonged to the city of Mirpurkhaas.
