= 2025 Kunar earthquake =

Earthquake in Kunar Province, Afghanistan

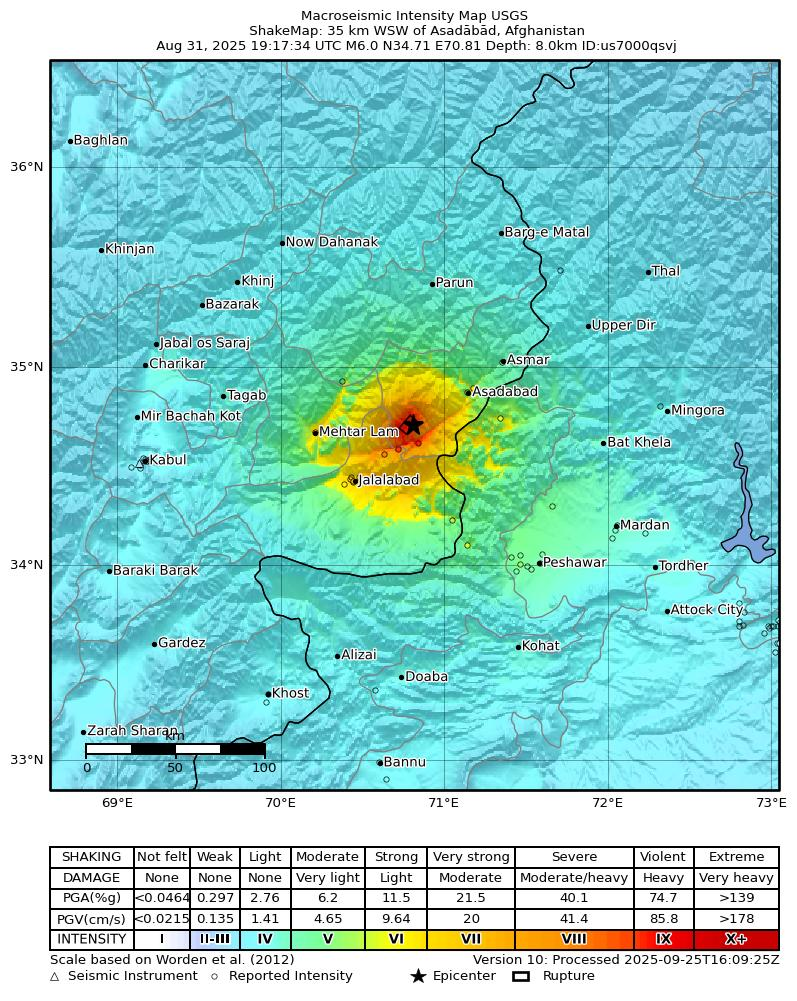
- USGS Shakemap intensity

- Location within Afghanistan
- UTC time: 2025-08-31 19:17:34
- ISC event: 643933543554
- USGS-ANSS: ComCat
- Local date: 31 August 2025
- Local time: 23:47:34 AFT (UTC+4:30)
- Magnitude: M_{w} 6.0
- Depth: 8 km (5 mi)
- Epicenter: 34.706°N 70.793°E
- Type: Thrust
- Areas affected: Kunar, Nangarhar, Laghman, Nuristan and Panjshir Provinces, Afghanistan
- Total damage: US$183 million
- Max. intensity: MMI IX (Violent)
- Aftershocks: 39+ ≥M_{w}4.0; M_{w} 5.6 on 4 September 2025 (strongest)
- Casualties: 2,217 deaths, 4,000+ injuries

On 31 August 2025, at 23:47 AFT (19:17 UTC), an earthquake with a magnitude of 6.0 on the moment magnitude scale (M_{w}) struck eastern Afghanistan, near the border with Pakistan. The epicenter of the quake was located in Nurgal District, Kunar Province. It had a hypocenter 8 kilometres (5 miles) beneath the surface, and the shaking had a maximum Modified Mercalli intensity of IX (Violent) in Nurgal. Several geological and structural factors led to a heavy impact from the earthquake's relatively moderate size, with at least 2,200 deaths, 4,000 injuries and 8,000 collapsed homes. Almost all of the casualties and destruction occurred in five districts of Kunar Province, where most buildings were damaged or destroyed, with nearby provinces also suffering damage and casualties. It was the deadliest earthquake to affect Afghanistan since 1998.

== Tectonic setting ==
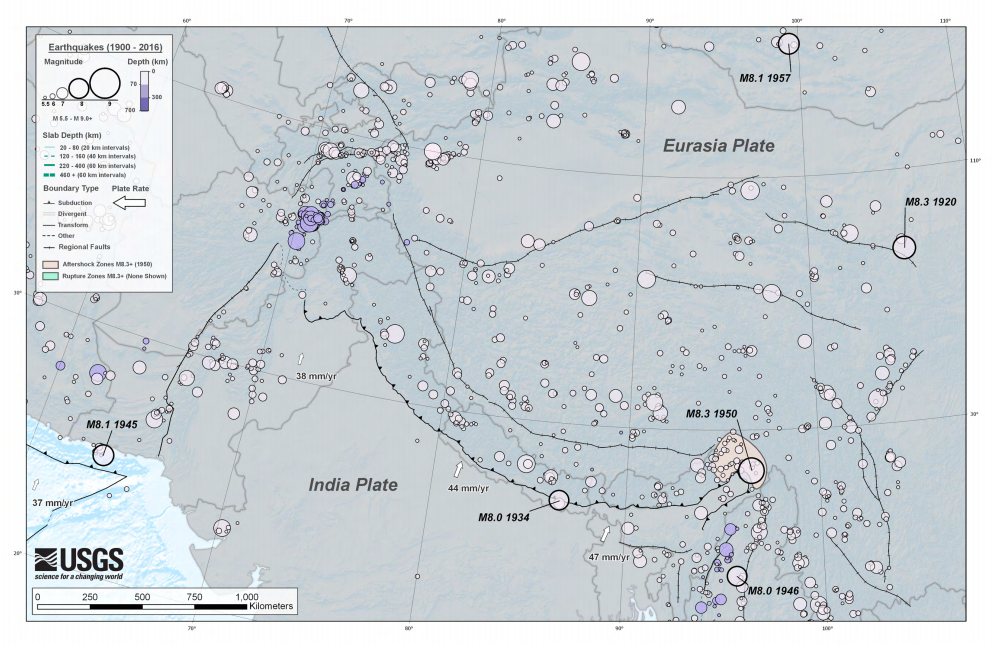
Tectonic plate boundary map of the South Asian region

Much of Afghanistan is situated in a broad zone of continental deformation within the Eurasian plate. Seismic activity in Afghanistan is influenced by the subduction of the Arabian plate to the west and the oblique subduction of the Indian plate in the east. The subduction rate of the Indian plate along the continental convergent boundary is estimated to be 39 mm/yr or higher. Transpression due to the plates interacting is associated with high seismicity within the shallow crust. Seismicity is detectable to a depth of 300 km (190 mi) beneath Afghanistan due to plate subduction.

These earthquakes beneath the Hindu Kush are the result of movement on faults accommodating detachment of the subducted crust. Within the shallow crust, the Chaman Fault represents a major transform fault associated with large shallow earthquakes that forms the transpressional boundary between the Eurasian and Indian plates. This zone consists of seismically active thrust and strike-slip faults that have accommodated crustal deformation since the beginning of the formation of the Himalayan orogeny. These earthquakes tend to display strike-slip faulting due to its abundance and high deformation rate.

== Earthquake ==
ECDM earthquake map

The earthquake occurred as a result of thrust faulting on a shallow fault. This fault was either a northeast–southwest striking fault dipping northwest or west-northwest–south-southeast striking fault dipping south–southeast. Its epicenter was located in Nurgal District in Kunar Province, 37 km (23 mi) west-southwest of the city of Asadabad and 27 km (17 mi) west of the border with Khyber Pakhtunkhwa province in Pakistan. It had a hypocenter 8 km (5.0 mi) beneath the surface.

A maximum Modified Mercalli intensity of IX (Violent) was estimated by the United States Geological Survey (USGS). According to the USGS' Prompt Assessment of Global Earthquakes for Response service, approximately 18,000 people were within the zone of intensity IX, and 107,000 people were exposed to VIII (Severe) shaking. The MMI of the earthquake was estimated to have reached IX at Nurgal District, VIII at Chawkay and Kuz Kunar Districts, VII (Very strong) at Jalalabad, and IV (Light) at Kabul and the Pakistani cities of Peshawar and Islamabad. Tremors were also felt in Lahore, and in parts of India, including Delhi.

At least 17 aftershocks were reportedly felt by 1 September. The largest aftershock measured M_{w} 5.6, and struck about 1 km (0.62 mi) northeast of the mainshock at 21:26 AFT on 4 September with a maximum Modified Mercalli intensity of VIII.

== Impact ==
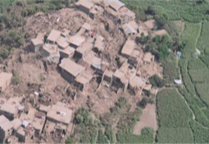
A destroyed village in Kunar Province

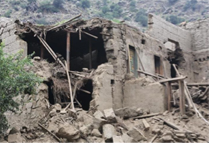
Homes destroyed in the Kunar Province

A Taliban spokesperson said that the earthquake killed 2,217 people, while the World Health Organisation (WHO) said nearly 3,000 people died and 4,000 were injured. At least 8,000 homes were also destroyed, while 441 villages were affected. In addition, 16 health centers were damaged. UNICEF said around half the number of dead, equivalent to at least 1,182 people, were children. At least 391 students and three teachers were among those killed, with 53 schools destroyed and 253 others affected. Several schools were unable to open on schedule on 6 September, affecting up to 157,074 students. Around 306 schoolbuildings were either destroyed or damaged. The USGS estimated between 1,000 and 10,000 deaths were possible, with nearly 890,000 people exposed to very strong to violent shaking. Most of the affected homes were made of mud and stone, the majority of which were built on steep valleys. This scared some families into camping on high ground or flat land to avoid aftershocks. Doshisha University professor Tsutsumi Hiroyuki said the destruction and high death toll were attributed to the earthquake's shallow depth, low quality building materials, and the ground beneath the epicentral area comprising soft sediments, which significantly amplified ground motions. The World Bank estimated the cost of physical damage caused by the quake at $183 million, with 97% of losses occurring in Nangarhar and Kunar Provinces and 35% accounting for damage to residential buildings.

Heavy rains in the days before the earthquake also exacerbated the destruction and put the area at risk of landslides. Many affected residents were among four million illegal migrants who had been deported from Iran and Pakistan. Filippo Grandi, the United Nations High Commissioner for Refugees, estimated that more than 500,000 people were affected, with many others being displaced. Save the Children estimated that 260,000 children were among those affected, with 280 being orphaned due to the earthquake. It added that around 37,000 children under the age of five and nearly 10,000 pregnant and breastfeeding mothers in the affected areas were at risk for malnutrition. The United Nations Population Fund said nearly 120,000 women of reproductive age, including 11,670 pregnant women, were in need of urgent assistance. A day after the earthquake, the full scale of the damage had yet to be known, with many affected villages still unreachable. The United Nations Development Programme also said that more than 1.3 million animals were affected in Nangarhar and Kunar provinces, while the Norwegian Refugee Council said more than 7,000 livestock were killed while seven irrigation systems were destroyed.

People in a destroyed village in Kunar Province

At least 2,205 people were killed, 3,640 others were injured, 5,400 homes and up to 65% of buildings collapsed and 98% of structures were damaged in Kunar Province, with five districts there particularly affected. Hundreds of casualties were feared in Nurgal District alone, and the villages of Wadir, Shomash, Masud, and Areet were reportedly destroyed, with many others being substantially damaged. Up to 90% of residents were feared dead or injured in Wadir. In the village of Mazar-e-Dara, where a resident said 95% of homes were destroyed, dozens of fatalities and nearly a hundred injuries were reported, while 79 villagers died in Andarlachak. An additional 200 deaths and 500 injuries were reported in Chawkay District, where the main hospital was severely damaged. Roads in Kunar, including the one connecting the province with Jalalabad, were blocked by landslides caused by the earthquake, aftershocks, and heavy rains, preventing many areas from being accessed quickly. In Nangarhar Province, 12 people were killed and 255 others were injured in Darai Nur District.

Eighty people were injured in Laghman Province, six of them seriously. Fifty-eight of the injuries in the province occurred in Alingar District. At least 14 homes collapsed in the province. Four people were injured in Nurgram District, Nuristan Province, and in neighboring Panjshir Province, five houses were destroyed in Abshar.

On 2 September, a magnitude 5.2 aftershock caused additional damage, some injuries, and landslides that blocked roads and slowed rescue efforts in the worst-hit areas.

A series of five aftershocks, the largest measuring M_{w} 5.6, struck on the evening of 4–5 September, causing two additional deaths, including one due to a house collapse in Sirkanay District. It also injured 51 people (22 in Nangarhar, 20 in Kunar, and 9 in Laghman), and destroyed 330 homes in Kunar, Laghman, and Nangarhar Provinces. Fourteen of the injured were students who jumped from windows at Syed Jamaluddin Afghan University in panic, and another was a volunteer injured by a rockfall. Further landslides blocked key roads connecting Kunar and Nangarhar.

On 23 September, a magnitude 4.9 aftershock injured 15 people, damaged several houses and triggered rockslides in Darai Nur District.

== Response ==
Hours after the earthquake, Taliban spokesman Zabihullah Mujahid said that local officials and volunteers had conducted rescue operations and provided aid to affected areas. The affected area also saw flash flooding over the weekend that killed at least five people and destroyed bridges and other infrastructure. The Taliban government mobilized its defence forces and allocated 100 million Afghan afghanis (US$1.5 million) in response to the disaster, while Prime Minister Hasan Akhund established a special committee led by the minister of rural rehabilitation and development, Mohammad Younus Akhundzada. Taliban authorities established a camp in Kunar to organize supplies and emergency aid. More than 5,000 tents were set up in the province to house displaced residents, while 72 temporary classrooms were also established. The Taliban were also reported to have carried out compulsory relief drives targeting students and teachers in Bamyan, Maidan Wardak and Ghazni Provinces. On 12 September, the Taliban's deputy prime minister, Abdul Ghani Baradar, visited Kunar province, during which he called for the lifting of sanctions against Afghanistan. The Taliban's foreign minister, Amir Khan Muttaqi, said the sanctions had prevented Afghans overseas from sending aid. He also called for the return of Afghan aircraft held in other countries Taliban takeover in 2021 to be used in humanitarian operations.

Due to having limited resources, the Taliban also requested relief from international aid organisations. Many volunteers in Nangarhar Province visited hospitals to donate blood to injured victims. Four helicopters carrying medical staff arrived at Nurgal District. Several victims were airlifted to Nangarhar Regional Hospital. The Afghan Air Force carried out at least 441 flights to transport at least 2,060 injured people and deliver at least 23,100 kg (50,900 lb) of aid. The Afghan Ministry of Defence transported 30 doctors and 800 kg (1,800 lb) of medical supplies into Kunar Province by air. The Afghan Red Crescent Society sent personnel to provide emergency assistance in affected areas. The Bayat Foundation and Afghan Wireless also sent aid and personnel, with the latter saying that it would activate a new telecommunications site in Nurgal District to help in the response. It also provided free SIM cards. An unidentified Afghan businessman based in Russia also sent 42.5 tons of food supplies to Afghanistan. One person died in Jalalabad due to suspected low blood pressure while donating blood for the victims at a hospital.

In Kunar, reports emerged of the absence of female medical staff severely hampering care for women patients amid restrictions placed by the Taliban on women's rights. The Taliban’s Justice Directorate in Nangarhar province also warned humanitarian workers and organizations against taking photographs of women while distributing aid, calling it "against Islamic and Afghan values". The Taliban’s police commander in Kunar was also reported to have threatened journalists against publishing stories with a "negative" image of the authorities’ response to the earthquake, including accounts from residents who said they lacked basic necessities.

The United Nations sent 20 emergency assessment teams to the affected areas and allocated $5 million in assistance. The World Health Organization (WHO) also warned that relief efforts had been hampered by cuts in funding that led to the closure of 44 clinics in the area and the suspension of the World Food Programme's (WFP) humanitarian air service earlier in the year, while more than 25 km^{2} (9.7 sq mi) of land in the affected areas was contaminated by mines and explosive ordnance due to years of conflict. The WHO said it needed $4 million in support, adding that overcrowding and unsanitary conditions are increasing the risk of disease. It also urged the Taliban to allow the entry of female medical workers. The WHO subsequently airlifted up to 80 tons of humanitarian aid from its hub in Dubai. The UN's special rapporteur on human rights in Afghanistan, Richard Bennett, called on Pakistan to suspend its deportation of Afghan migrants in light of the disaster. This was rejected by the Pakistani government on 5 September. On 9 September, the UN launched an emergency appeal to raise $139.6 million in funds for a four-month response plan.

The European Union sent 130 tonnes of aid through a chartered humanitarian flight and pledged one million euros ($1.2 million) in assistance, with Ireland also pledging another one million euros. Save the Children sent medical teams to Kunar, while Médecins Sans Frontières deployed teams to hospitals in Nangarhar and Laghman provinces.

Iran offered humanitarian aid, including medical supplies, and delivered a total of 220 tons of material. India sent 1,000 tents, 15 tons of food and 21 tonnes of relief material to Afghanistan. The United Kingdom said it would provide an initial £1 million ($1.3 million) in humanitarian assistance through "experienced partners", the United Nations Population Fund and the International Red Cross. It later pledged another £3 million. The Chinese government and private companies operating in Afghanistan provided at least $200,000 and two truckloads of material aid, with the Chinese government pledging an additional 50 million yuan ($7 million). Both Switzerland and the United Arab Emirates (UAE) also pledged humanitarian aid, with the UAE sending food, medical supplies, tents and a search and rescue team to Afghanistan. Turkey sent aid packages for 1,000 affected families, while the provincial government of Khyber Pakhtunkhwa in Pakistan sent 35 truckloads of relief goods through the Torkham border crossing. Pakistan's federal government also sent 105 tonnes of humanitarian aid through Torkham. Bangladesh sent an aircraft carrying humanitarian aid to Kabul.

Both South Korea and Australia pledged $1 million each in aid. South Korea said it would deliver the amount through the United Nations while the Australian government said that it would work with established partners to ensure its support helped those in need rather than the Taliban government. Turkmenistan sent an aircraft carrying humanitarian aid to Afghanistan. The Qatari Air Force launched an air bridge operation to transport aid to Afghanistan, with four of its aircraft landing in Kabul with emergency relief supplies, including two field hospitals, food, medical aid and shelter materials for approximately 11,000 people. The initiative was overseen in Kabul by Qatari minister of state for international cooperation Mariam bint Ali bin Nasser Al Misnad, who became the first female minister to visit Afghanistan on a humanitarian mission since the Taliban takeover in 2021. Russia also sent at least 20 metric tons of food to Afghanistan by plane following orders from president Vladimir Putin. Japan also sent emergency aid to Kabul which was then transferred to the International Federation of Red Cross and Red Crescent Societies (IFRC) and the Afghan Red Crescent Society. It also allocated $1 million to the WFP and the IFRC. Tajikistan sent at least 3,000 tons of humanitarian aid.

== See also ==
- List of earthquakes in 2025
- List of earthquakes in Afghanistan
- 2025 Balkh earthquake
- April 2009 Afghanistan earthquake
- 2013 Laghman earthquake
- June 2022 Afghanistan earthquake
- September 2022 Afghanistan earthquake
