= Enquiries & Anti-Corruption Establishment (Sindh) =

Pakistani Government position

The Enquiries & Anti-Corruption Establishment is a specialised department of the Government of Sindh.

Its Chairman E&ACE commands over the Anti-Corruption Police, which is a specialised force that conducts raids and traps. The Anti-Corruption Police is also used for the protection of higher-ups in the Anti-Corruption Department.
