= 2024 Guzara attack =

Terrorist attack in Afghanistan

- Part of the Afghan conflict and terrorism in Afghanistan
- Location: Imam Zaman Mosque, Guzara, Herat Province, Afghanistan
- Date: April 29, 2024; 21:00
- Target: Shia Muslims
- Attack type: Mass shooting
- Weapon: AK-47
- Deaths: 6
- Injuries: 1
- Perpetrator: Islamic State – Khorasan Province
- Motive: Anti-Shi'ism

The 2024 Guzara Attack was a terrorist attack against Shia Muslims in Guzara, Herat Province, Afghanistan on April 29, 2024, by the Islamic State – Khorasan Province.

== Background ==
The Islamic State as a whole has made its ideology of Islamic Statism to Sunni supremacy and Takfirism against Shia Muslims with attacks like the Camp Speicher massacre, unlike the group it split from, Al-Qaeda, which attempts to maintain positive Shia–Sunni relations.

== Attack ==
On the night of 29 April 2024 at 9 PM, an attacker stormed into the Imam Zaman mosque and opened fired on worshippers inside. The attacker sprayed bullets randomly at worshippers, killing six, including a 3-year-old child and the Imam who was leading the prayers, and injuring one. The attacker used an AK-47 to shoot at the worshippers before he fled the scene.

== Aftermath ==
Though no one immediately took responsibility for the attack, a day later the Islamic State – Khorasan Province claimed responsibility through their telegram channel. Many organizations and people condemning the attack including the former president of Afghanistan, Hamid Karzai, said on a post on X: "I strongly condemn the attack on the Imam Zaman Mosque, I consider this terrorist act against all religious and human standards.", the United Nations Assistance Mission in Afghanistan, the Iranian embassy in Kabul, and the Taliban with them denouncing and accusing the Islamic State even before they claimed responsibility for the attack.
