= BCDA =

BCDA can refer to:

- Bases Conversion and Development Authority, a Philippine government agency
- Balochistan Coastal Development Authority, a provincial agency of Government of Pakistan
