= Muttaqi =

Muttaqi is a surname. Notable people with the surname include:

- al-Muttaqi (908–968), Abbasid Caliph in Baghdad
- Al-Muttaqi al-Hindi (1472–1567), Sunni Islamic scholar
- Ahmadullah Muttaqi (fl. 2020), Afghan Taliban politician
- Amir Khan Muttaqi (born 1971), Afghan Taliban politician
- Khan Muttaqi Nadeem (1940–2006), Pakistani advocate lawyer, poet and author
