= Deportation of Afghan immigrants from the United States =

Deportation of Afghan immigrants from the United States typically refers to the forced repatriation of Afghans who are convicted of crimes in the United States and are not American citizens.

== History ==
The earliest Afghan immigrant in deportation proceedings has been reported in 1945. The immigration officials suspended (cancelled) his deportation, which allowed him to remain in the United States with his American family. Another Afghan immigrant was placed in deportation proceedings in the early 1950s.

=== Afghans escaping from totalitarianism and genocide ===
Afghanistan began to experience a great turmoil in the 1970s, which resulted in a mass exodus of its citizens. These people were first admitted to neighboring Pakistan and Iran as refugees escaping from: (1) totalitarianism and genocide orchestrated by the communist People's Democratic Party of Afghanistan (PDPA); and (2) political repression of the mujahideen, who were engaged in a guerrilla warfare with the PDPA. Pakistan and Iran do not provide citizenship or permanent residency to Afghan refugees. In 1980, Congress and the Carter administration enacted the Refugee Act, which approved 50,000 international refugees to be firmly resettled in the United States each year.

=== Resettlement of Afghan immigrants in the United States ===
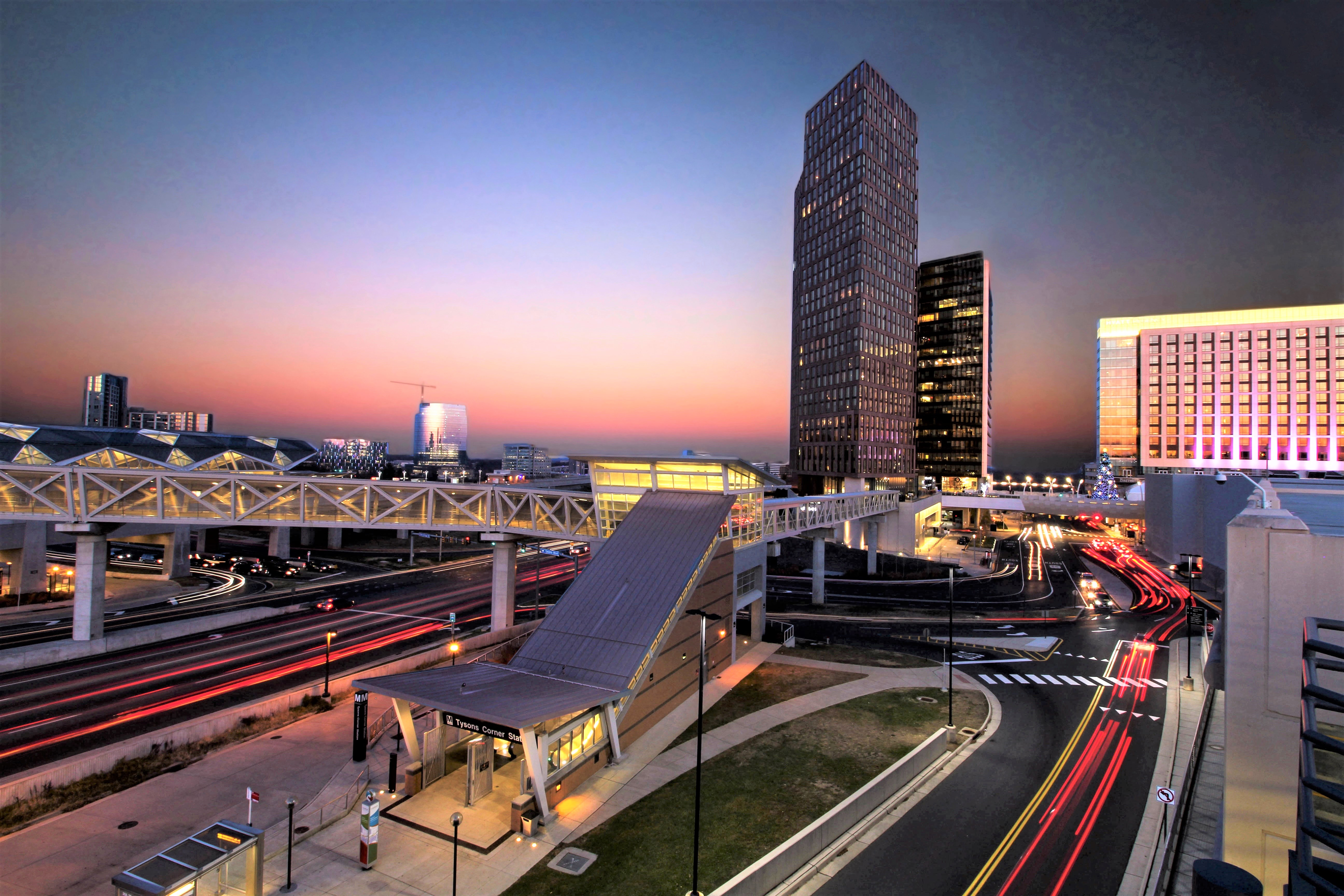
Northern Virginia is one of three places in the United States where large number of Afghan refugees were firmly resettled since around 1980.

Each year (from 1980 onward) groups of Afghan refugee families lawfully entered the United States. These families were issued by the U.S. Department of State special travel documents. At least one such family entered with fraudulent documents and applied for asylum in the United States. These immigrant families were firmly resettled all across the United States but mainly in and around New York City followed by in California, Virginia, Texas, Georgia, Pennsylvania, Florida and elsewhere.

== Reasons for forceful deportation from the United States to Afghanistan ==
About Afghan-Americans, Cato Institute stated:

Afghan immigrants aged 18–54 in the United States were incarcerated at a rate of 127 per 100,000 Afghan immigrants in 2017. By comparison, native‐born Americans in the same age range were incarcerated at a rate of 1,477 per 100,000 native‐born Americans. In other words, native‐born Americans were about 11.6 times as likely to be incarcerated as Afghan immigrants. Afghans don’t pose much of a serious criminal threat in the United States.

— Alex Nowrasteh, August 2021

Although Afghanistan and the United States have no repatriation agreement, approximately 378 people from the United States have been expelled, returned or extradited to Afghanistan between November 2002 and January 2016. At least 225 had no criminal conviction.

According to Fox News, "ICE deported more than 200 people from the U.S. to Afghanistan" in the last decade. These people were Afghan refugees and asylum seekers, including Afghan-Americans who have been convicted of a common crime in the United States. Some may have been wrongfully deported. "Recent data suggests that in 2010 well over 4,000 U.S. citizens were detained or deported as aliens[.]"

== See also ==
- Anti-Afghan sentiment
- Non-refoulement
- United Nations High Commissioner for Refugees (UNHCR)
- Deportation of undocumented Afghans from Pakistan
- Deportation of Indian nationals under Donald Trump
- 2025 Afghan deportation from Iran
