= PS-36 Shaheed Benazirabad-I =

Constituency of the Provincial Assembly of Sindh, Pakistan

- Constituency for the Provincial Assembly of Sindh
- Region: Daur Taluka (partly) including Daur Town of Shaheed Benazirabad District
- Electorate: 237,564

Current constituency
- Member: Vacant
- Created from: PS-25 Nawabshah-II & PS-24 Nawabshah-I (2002-2018); PS-37 Nawabshah-I (2018-2023)

PS-36 Shaheed Benazirabad-I (پی ایس-36، شہید بینظیر آباد-1) is a constituency of the Provincial Assembly of Sindh.

== General elections 2024 ==
Provincial election 2024: PS-36 Shaheed Benazirabad-I
Party	Candidate	Votes	%	±%
PPP	Azra Fazal Pechuho	75,485	73.89	
PTI	Mir Bahawal Khan Rind (Note: Filed nomination papers as PTI candidate but ECP allowed him to run as an Independent)	16,659	16.31	
JUI (F)	Abdul Razzaque Shar	4,411	4.32	
TLP	Irian Ali	3,128	3.06	
Others	Others (nine candidates)	2,478	2.42	
Turnout		105,962	44.60	
Total valid votes		102,161	96.41	
Rejected ballots		3,801	3.59	
Majority		58,826	57.58	
Registered electors		237,564		
PPP hold				

== General elections 2018 ==
Provincial election 2018: PS-37 Shaheed Benazirabad-I
Party	Candidate	Votes	%	±%
PPP	Dr. Azra Fazal Pecheho	55,525	59.79	
GDA	Syed Bagh Ali Shah	24,640	26.53	
PML(N)	Abdul Hafeez	2,952	3.18	
Independent	Ameer Ali Brohi	2,288	2.46	
MMA	Mehmood Ahmed Korai	2,192	2.36	
TLP	Ali Akbar Umrani	1,580	1.70	
PTI	Imran Ayoub	1,199	1.29	
Independent	Saleem Raza	542	0.58	
Independent	Sardar Sher Muhammad Rind	507	0.55	
Independent	Abdul Hameed Rind	299	0.32	
Independent	Muhammad Rahim	211	0.23	
Independent	Muhammad Arif Samoon	210	0.23	
PSP	Shabana	169	0.18	
Independent	Ali Akbar Jamali	168	0.18	
Independent	Khair Ud Din	118	0.13	
Independent	Ameer Ali Jamali	102	0.11	
SUP	Mujahid Ali	89	0.10	
Independent	Aijaz Ali	69	0.07	
Majority		30,885	33.26	
Valid ballots		92,860		
Rejected ballots		4,455		
Turnout		97,315		
Registered electors		195,498		
hold				

== General elections 2013 ==
Contesting candidates	Party affiliation	Votes polled

== General elections 2008 ==
Contesting candidates	Party affiliation	Votes polled

== See also ==
- PS-35 Naushahro Feroze-IV
- PS-37 Nawabshah-II
