= Punjab Health Department =

The Punjab Health Department is a government agency of Punjab, Pakistan that delivers preventive healthcare, as well as curative care health care services from the primary health care level to the tertiary care level.

== Statistics ==
The Department runs:

- 2,502 basic health units
- 316 rural health centers
- 88 Tehsil headquarter hospitals
- 36 district headquarter hospitals
- 46 Teaching hospitals/tertiary care hospitals
- Pakistan is number 8 out of the 22 most disease burdened countries in the world.
- TB is most common in Pakistan.

== Departments ==
=== Directorate General Health Services Punjab ===
The Directorate is responsible for overseeing the provision of primary and secondary health care services throughout the province.

=== Directorate General of Nursing ===
The functions of the Directorate General of Nursing are:

- Nursing services
- Nursing education

== List of Director Generals ==
Rank and Name	Start of Term	End of Term
Dr. Riaz Mustafa Syed	Jan 1992	May 1992
Dr. Abdul Qadir Khan	May 1992	May 1994
Dr. Habib Ullah	Jun 1994	Feb 1995
Dr. Khalid Saifullah	Feb 1995	Mar 1997
Dr. Muhammad Anwar Khan	Mar 1997	May 1997
Dr. Muhammad Afzal Hashmi	May 1997	Dec 1998
Dr. Karam Hussain Sheikh	Jan 1999	Jun 1999
Dr. Tahir Pervaiz Meer	Jun 1999	Dec 1999
Dr. Khursheed Ahmad	Jan 2000	Jun 2000
Dr. Saeed Ahmad Qureshi	Aug 2000	May 2001
Dr. Muhammad Yaqoob Jaffar	Jun 2001	Jun 2002
Dr. Sabeeha Khursheed	Jun 2002	Jun 2003
Dr. Khalid Mehmood Tikka	Jun 2003	Sep 2005
Dr. Muhammad Aslam Chaudhary	Oct 2005	Jan 2012
Dr. Nisar Ahmed Cheema	Feb 2012	Mar 2013
Dr. Tanvir Ahmed	Apr 2013	Oct 2013
Dr. Zafar Ikram	Oct 2013	Dec 2013
Dr. Zahid Pervaiz	Dec 2013	Dec 2015
Dr. Mukhtar Hussain Syed	Jan 2016	Feb 2017
Dr. Faisal Zahoor	Feb 2017	Nov 2017
Dr. Akhter Rasheed	Nov 2017	Mar 2018
Dr. Munir Ahmed	Mar 2018	April 2019
Dr. Haroon Jahangir Khan	May 2019	November 2022
Dr. Muhammad Ilyas Gondal	November 2022	present

=== Punjab Health Foundation ===
The Foundation assists and promotes the private sector in providing better grassroots health care.

== Attached Institutions ==
=== Punjab Pharmacy Council ===
The Punjab Pharmacy Council regulates the practice of pharmacy.

=== Provincial Quality Control Board ===
The Provincial Quality Control Board was established under the Drugs Act of 1976, to ensure the availability of quality drugs for the general public.

== Autonomous Institutions ==
Under the Punjab Medical and Health Institutions Act of 2003, the medical colleges and teaching hospitals have been declared autonomous bodies.

== See also ==
- Ministry of National Health Services Regulation and Coordination
- Health care in Pakistan
- Ministry of Public Health (Sindh)
- Ministry of Health Balochistan
