= Deportation of undocumented Afghans from Pakistan =

Mass exodus of Afghan nationals in 2023

In October 2023, the government of Pakistan announced a plan to deport foreign nationals who either did not have valid visas or had overstayed their visa for more than one year. The mass deportations primarily affected those Afghans who had no legal documents to be in Pakistan. There were an estimated 3.8 million Afghans in Pakistan at the time the deportation order was announced, according to the United Nations, while Pakistani authorities believed the number to be as high as 4.4 million. Afghans accounted for 98% of the foreign nationals in Pakistan. According to UN figures, around 2.713 million Afghans have returned to Afghanistan from Pakistan, since 2023.

The government cited increasing crime and violence, including suicide attacks, as the motivation for the mass deportations. However, outside observers noted there were likely also political reasons for the sudden deportations, for example that Pakistan hoped to pressure the Taliban interim government to crackdown on TTP (Pakistani Taliban) safe havens in Afghanistan.

== Background ==
Afghan migration to Pakistan dates back to the Soviet invasion of Afghanistan in 1979, which led to over three million Afghans seeking refuge in Pakistan. Significant waves of Afghan refugees also came to Pakistan after the U.S. invasion of Afghanistan in 2001 and in 2021 when the Taliban returned to power following the US troop withdrawal from Afghanistan. While some have returned home, around 4.4 million Afghan nationals, both documented and undocumented, remained in Pakistan in October 2023 according to government figures. Many were born and raised in Pakistan and have never been to Afghanistan. The government claimed around 1.7 million were without visas.

The government stated the deportations were a response to an increase in terrorist attacks in Pakistan. Pakistani officials said there have been 24 suicide bombings since January, 14 of which were carried out by Afghan nationals. Eight of the 11 militants who recently attacked two Pakistani military installations in southwestern Balochistan province were Afghans. The Pakistani government attributes this surge in violence to the Afghan Taliban providing safe harbor to the Tehreek-e-Taliban Pakistan (TTP), Balochistan Liberation Army (BLA), and Balochistan Liberation Front (BLF) which have organised several of these attacks.

On 3 October 2023, in a high committee meeting of the National Action Plan (NAP) chaired by Caretaker Prime Minister Anwarul Haq Kakar, the Pakistani government declared that all foreign nationals residing illegally in the country have to voluntarily leave the country or face deportation by 31 October. During this time, 100,000–165,000 Afghans voluntarily left Pakistan. Sarfraz Bugti, the interim Interior Minister, disclosed that a significant portion of suicide bombings in Pakistan that year were orchestrated by Afghan citizens.

== Logistics ==
On 1 November, the Ministry of Interior issued instructions to all provinces to deport illegal aliens under the Foreigners Act, 1946. The government deployed law enforcement officials across the country. It also launched a phone hotline for people to inform on undocumented immigrants.

The Ministry of Interior has established 49 holding areas throughout the country to detain undocumented immigrants. These holding centers have been set up in all 36 districts of Punjab, three in Khyber Pakhtunkhwa: Peshawar, Haripur and Khyber districts, two in Sindh: Kemari and Malir districts and three in Balochistan: Quetta, Chagai and Pishin districts. One holding center has also been established in the federal capital Islamabad and Gilgit.

Caretaker Interior Minister Sarfaraz Bugti directed authorities and agencies to treat undocumented migrants with respect while they are detained, but also threatened anyone involved in aiding, harboring, or renting a home to an undocumented immigrant with prosecution. He urged Pakistani citizens to inform the government about illegal immigrants and their residences.

== Deportation ==
There have been numerous reports of both undocumented Afghans and Afghans who have refugee status being targeted by police amidst the campaign: and around US$4 billion in Afghan-owned properties and other assets have reportedly been seized by Pakistan's government.

In an effort to regulate illegal immigration, Pakistan is implementing the "One Document Regime" (ODR). This policy mandates all foreign nationals, including Afghans, to possess a valid visa for travel to the country. The ODR, already operational at the Torkham border crossing, is a significant step in controlling the movement of people and goods across the border.

As of 5 November 2023, according to Pakistani border officials, 174,358 Afghan nationals in total left for Afghanistan since 17 September 2023.

=== Balochistan ===
To accelerate the deportation process, additional crossing points have been established in Qila Saifullah, Qameruddin Karez, and Baracha Noor Wahab in the Chagai district by the authorities in Balochistan. These steps are designed to aid Afghan and Iranian Baloch immigrants in adhering to the 31 October deadline.

=== Islamabad ===
The Islamabad police has finished the process of marking the locations of Afghan individuals residing in various areas of the federal capital. Additionally, a survey regarding the properties owned by Afghan nationals is currently in progress.

Afghans who failed to leave the country were detained in nationwide sweeps and had their illegal mud-brick houses on the outskirts of the capital Islamabad demolished.

On 7 March 2025, Pakistan's interior ministry ordered all undocumented foreigners and Afghan Citizen Card holders to leave by 31 March or face deportation from April onwards.

=== Punjab ===
After the deadline expired, a deportation operation for illegal foreign nationals, including Afghans, was launched across Punjab. The plan, finalized by Punjab's Inspector General of Police, Dr. Usman Anwar, began its phased evacuation of illegal immigrants on 3 November. The operation spans multiple divisions within Punjab, such as Rawalpindi, Gujranwala, Sargodha, Sheikhupura, Faisalabad, Lahore, Sahiwal, Bahawalpur, Multan, and Dera Ghazi Khan. Small number of Pakistani citizens have also been wrongfully arrested and detained as Afghan citizens.

=== Sindh ===
The Caretaker Cabinet of Sindh has decided to allocate 4.5 billion rupees for the repatriation of illegal immigrants. This amount was required for the repatriation of illegal aliens from Karachi, Sukkur, Hyderabad, Shaheed Benazirabad, Larkana and Mirpurkhas divisions. The cabinet approved funds beyond the budget allocation.

== Criticism ==
In November 2023, Pakistan imposed an $830 (£660) exit fee on Afghans who lacked an unexpired visa. The reportedly unprecedented action targeted refugees who were waiting to leave Pakistan for Western nations as part of resettlement programs. The United Nations and Western diplomats have denounced as "shocking and frustrating" Pakistan's move to charge hundreds of dollars in exit fees to each Afghan refugee who fled the Taliban's persecution.

The BBC was informed by the UNHCR that it is working to "resolve the issue" and that "[they] are advocating for the authorities to exempt refugees from these requirements."

The Pakistani Ministry of Foreign Affairs stated that "Pakistani laws, like the immigration laws in other countries including the United Kingdom, have fines and punishments for individuals who overstay their visas or are in violation of immigration laws."

== Reactions ==
=== Taliban interim government ===
The Taliban-led government has expressed strong disapproval of Pakistan's move to deport Afghans residing in the country without permission, urging the Pakistani government to reconsider its decision.

=== International organizations ===
The ongoing mass deportation has been condemned by the United Nations and Human Rights Watch, with the latter calling on Pakistan to halt the deportations while also calling on Western countries to immediately expediate the immigration process for those Afghans in Pakistan who are deemed to be "particularly at risk" if they are sent to Afghanistan.

Amnesty International urged the reversal of the decision and condemned Pakistan's authorities for "arbitrarily arresting and harassing" Afghans living in the country. The expulsions have further inflamed bilateral tensions with the Taliban government, which has criticized Pakistan's actions and urged the Pakistani government to "give more time" to Afghans leaving the country.

The United Nations and international human rights organizations have raised alarms about Pakistan's intentions to remove Afghan individuals who entered the country illegally. They emphasize that a significant number, including those who fled Afghanistan after the Taliban's takeover in August 2021, are at risk of being deported.

Following the 2025 Kunar earthquake, the UN's special rapporteur on human rights in Afghanistan, Richard Bennett, called on Pakistan to suspend its deportation of Afghan migrants in light of the disaster.

=== Pakistani government ===
Pakistan's caretaker government has stated that there will be no extension of the deadline for illegal immigrants to leave the country, and claimed that the deportation is in line with international law.

Caretaker Prime Minister Anwarul Haq Kakar said that the government's repatriation policy is not exclusive to Afghan nationals, but applies to all illegal immigrants in Pakistan. He stated that despite not being a signatory to the Geneva Convention, Pakistan has hosted over 4 million Afghan refugees for the past 40 years. He said that while not all Afghans are involved in illegal activities, significant groups contribute to the problem.

Foreign Office spokesperson Mumtaz Zahra Baloch stated that the operation is not aimed at any particular nationality and the repatriation process adheres to international norms and principles, and will not affect foreign nationals who are legally residing or registered in Pakistan. She said that the government "takes its commitments towards protection and safety needs of those in vulnerable situations with utmost seriousness", and that the repatriation of illegals will continue without revision.

Interim Home Minister Sarfraz Bugti stated that the government's deportation drive is aimed at including all people living illegally in the country, not just Afghans. He said that the government's message regarding action against illegal residents was misunderstood. The statement was made at a time when the government's deadline for illegal residents to leave the country was approaching.

Defence Minister Khawaja Asif accused Afghan refugees of harboring terrorists, saying Pakistan was suffering for "60 years of hospitality to 60 million refugees" and called for their return.

== See also ==
- Deportation of Afghan immigrants from the United States
- Anti-Afghan sentiment
- 2025 Afghan deportation from Iran
- 2025 hunger crisis in Afghanistan
