= Health care in Karachi =

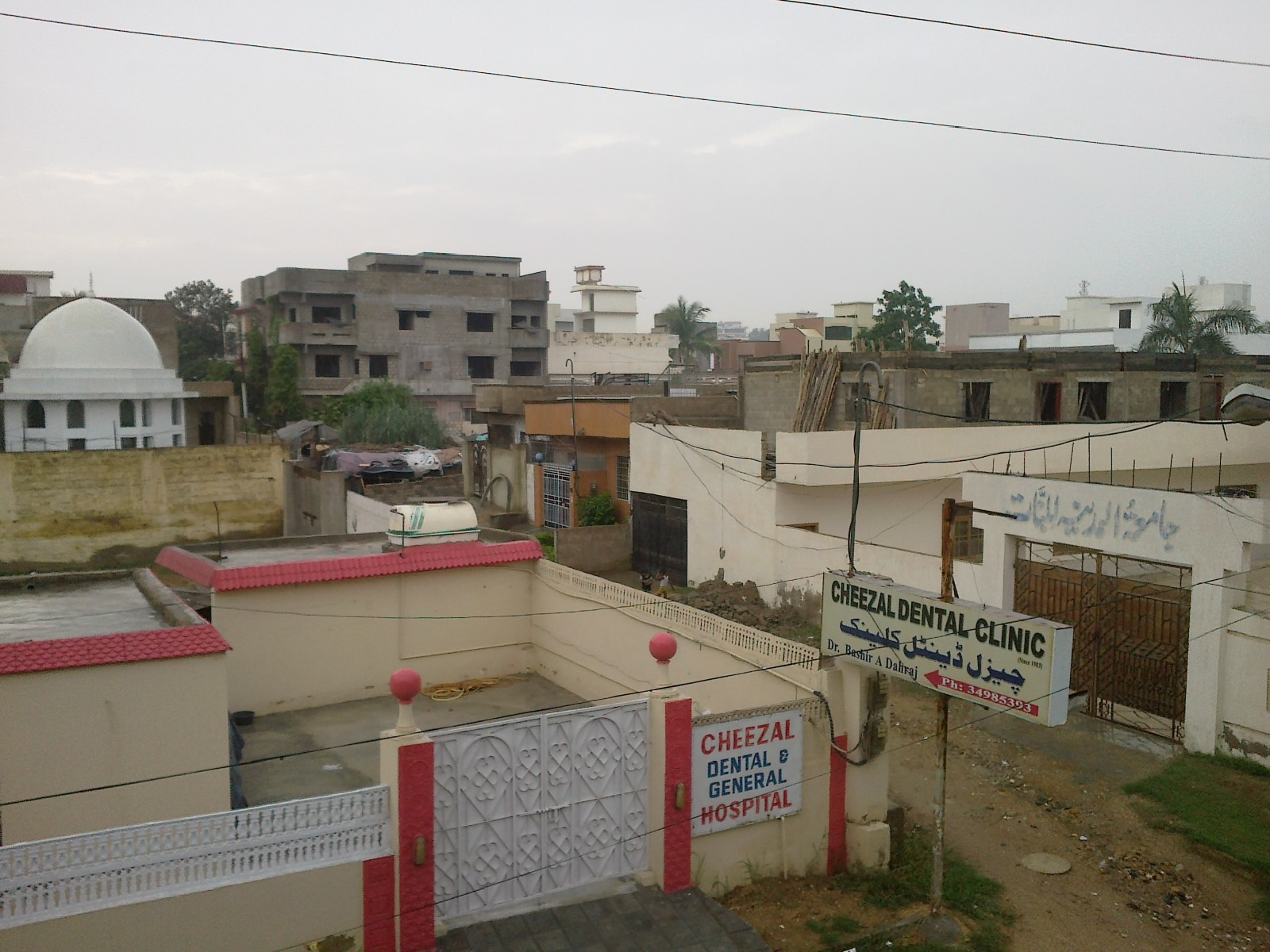
Dental clinic in Karachi

Health care in Karachi, Sindh, Pakistan is administered by both private and public health care providers. Health care is the diagnosis, treatment, and prevention of disease, illness, injury, and other physical and mental impairments in human beings. Health care is delivered by practitioners in allied health, dentistry, midwifery (obstetrics), medicine, nursing, optometry, pharmacy, psychology and other health professions. It refers to the work done in providing primary care, secondary care, and tertiary care, as well as in public health.

Under the Constitution, every province is charged with managing public health. The Sindh Ministry of Health is responsible for public health in the province. All the medical colleges in the province are also under the jurisdiction of the Sindh Ministry of Health. The private sector accounts for about 80% of all outpatient visits in Pakistan.

== Public health care ==
Health care in Pakistan is mostly private where the government provides a small amount of the total health expenditures, with the remainder being entirely private, out-of-pocket expenses. Health care delivery in Pakistan on the other hand, is the worst of both worlds; not only the health care delivery is predominantly private there are no watchdog bodies, agencies or audit commissions to monitor quality. The result is a thriving private practice; which is unregulated and unmonitored. The majority of clinicians in the city of Karachi are practising without any accountability and are not answerable to any higher authority. More than often complex procedures are undertaken in clinics and smaller hospitals, which are unequipped to deal with complications. Health and safety regulations simply do not exist.

== Digital health initiatives ==
Access to healthcare in Karachi's semiurban and peri-urban settlements, such as those in Gadap, remains constrained by shortages of healthcare infrastructure and personnel. A 2025 qualitative study led by researchers at the Aga Khan University examined the feasibility of digital healthcare delivery in three semiurban villages in Gadap, surveying 152 stakeholders including community members, healthcare providers, and digital health experts. The study found digital healthcare to be broadly acceptable and practically feasible among both demand-side (patients and community members) and supply-side (providers) stakeholders, and recommended a "hub and spoke" model combining in-person and remote digital consultations to expand access in underserved areas of the city. The researchers noted that implementation would require tailoring digital health tools to local needs through collaborative design involving all relevant stakeholders.

== See also ==
- Health care in Pakistan
- Ministry of Public Health
- List of hospitals in Karachi
