= Saeed Ghani =

Pakistani politician

Provincial Minister of Sindh for Labour & Human Resources, Social Protection
- Incumbent
- Assumed office 12 March 2024

Provincial Minister of Sindh for Labour
- In office 5 August 2019 – 11 August 2023

Provincial Minister of Sindh for Information
- In office 5 August 2021 – 11 August 2023
- Preceded by: Nasir Hussain Shah
- In office 5 August 2019 – 3 February 2020
- Succeeded by: Nasir Hussain Shah

Provincial Minister of Sindh for Human Resources
- In office 3 February 2020 – 11 August 2023

Provincial Minister of Sindh for Education and Literacy
- In office 3 February 2020 – 5 August 2021
- Preceded by: Syed Sardar Ali Shah
- Succeeded by: Syed Sardar Ali Shah

Member of the Provincial Assembly of Sindh
- In office 13 August 2018 – 11 August 2023
- Constituency: PS-104 Karachi East-VI
- In office July 2017 – 28 May 2018

Member of the Senate of Pakistan
- In office 12 March 2012 – 20 July 2017

Personal details
- Born: 8 November 1972 (age 54) Karachi, Sindh, Pakistan
- Party: PPP (2012-present)

Saeed Ghani Khaskheli (Sindhi: سعيد غني خاصخيلي; Urdu: سعید غنی خاصخیلی; born 8 November 1972) is a Pakistani politician who served as the Provincial Minister of Sindh for Labour and Information and Human Resources. He had been a member of the Provincial Assembly of Sindh from August 2018 to August 2023. Previously, he was a member of Provincial Assembly of Sindh from July 2017 to May 2018 and a member of the Senate of Pakistan. He is currently serving as a member of the Provincial Assembly of Sindh for PS-105 Karachi East-IX and as the Provincial Minister for Local Government.He is the member of Ministry of State Stability

== Political career ==
He was elected to the Senate of Pakistan as a candidate of the Pakistan Peoples Party (PPP) in the 2012 Pakistani Senate election. In July 2017, he resigned from the Senate to run for a seat in the Provincial Assembly of Sindh.

He was elected to the Provincial Assembly of Sindh as candidate of PPP from Constituency PS-114 (Karachi-XXVI) in by-polls held in July 2017.

He was re-elected to the Provincial Assembly of Sindh as a candidate of PPP from Constituency PS-104 (Karachi East-VI) in the 2018 Pakistani general election.

On 19 August, he was inducted into the provincial Sindh cabinet of Chief Minister Syed Murad Ali Shah and was made Provincial Minister of Sindh for Local Government with the additional ministerial portfolios of Public Health Engineering and Rural Development, and Katchi Abadies.

On 5 August 2019, he was appointed as Provincial Minister of Sindh for Labour, Information and Archive.

He was appointed as Provincial Minister of Sindh for Education and Literacy and Human Resources succeeding Syed Sardar Ali Shah as Minister of Education as Chief Minister Murad Ali Shah reshuffled the Cabinet of Sindh on 3 February 2020.

On 5 August 2021, he was re-appointed Minister of Information Sindh and was later succeeded by Syed Sardar Ali Shah as Minister of Education. He Belongs to Khashkheli family of Sindh.
