= Constituency PS-24 (Nawabshah-I) =

Former constituency of the Provincial Assembly of Sindh, Pakistan

PS-24 Nawabshah-I
- Former constituency for the Provincial Assembly of Sindh

Former constituency
- Abolished: 2018
- Replaced by: PS-37 Nawabshah-I

PS-24 Nawabshah-I was a constituency of the Provincial Assembly of Sindh. It was abolished after 2018 Delimitations as Nawabshah District lost 1 seat in 2017 Census.

== See also ==
- Sindh
