= Sindh Coastal Development Authority =

Agency overview
- Jurisdiction: Government of Sindh
- Headquarters: Karachi, Pakistan
- Website: Official website

Sindh Coastal Development Authority is responsible for development projects on coastal areas of Sindh, Pakistan.

== See also ==
- Balochistan Coastal Development Authority
- Government of Sindh
- Sindh Information Department
