= Sindh Health Department =

Government ministry in Sindh, Pakistan

Health Department of Sindh
- Emblem of Government of Sindh

- Flag of Government of Sindh
- Incumbent; Azra Fazal Pechuho
- Reports to: Chief Minister of Sindh
- Residence: Karachi
- Seat: Sindh
- Appointer: Chief Minister of Sindh; with Provincial Assembly of Sindh advice and consent
- Term length: 5 years
- Website: Official Website

The Sindh Health Department is the provincial department that oversees healthcare for the Pakistani province of Sindh. Several are held responsible for running the department including a cabinet minister and health secretary which are members of the Government of Sindh.

== Leadership ==
The department's executive leadership consists of political, secretarial, and technical administrative officers:

- Minister for Health and Population Welfare: Azra Fazal Pechuho
- Secretary Health: Tahir Hussain Sangi
- Director General Health Services: Dr. Parvez Ahmed Shaikh

== Functions ==
The districts are looked after By DHOs (District Health Officers) that are of BPS-20 who they report to the Director (BPS-20) of the city. The hospitals are run by Medical Superintendents (MS) of BPS-20. All of them report to the DG Health Sindh BPS-20 (Director-General Health Sindh BPS-20) who is the highest and the most powerful officer after the Secretary Health.

=== Additional posts ===
1.Additional District Health Officers (BPS-19) [Preventive, Curative and Planning and Development].They are 3 officers for each district and assist the DHO in running the District.

2. Additional Medical Superintendents (BPS-19). They assist the MS in running the hospital.

3. Additional Directors. They assist the Director to run the Health-related affairs of the city. They are of (BPS-19) and (BPS-20).

4. Director NICVD (BPS-20).

5. EPI Project Director (BPS-20).

6. Secretary Sindh Blood Transfusion Authority (BPS-20).

7. Focal Persons on Smoking, Polio and various others programs (BPS-19) or (BPS-20).

8. Heads of the Departments in a hospital (BPS-19) to (BPS-20).

9. Physiotherapists (BPS-17 to BPS-20).They become Chief Physiotherapists when they come in (BPS-20).

10. Radiologists (X-Ray Men)

11. Nursing Superintendents and Director Nursing.

The Health Officials, DHO and MS and the Director are in 24 hours contact with the Deputy Commissioner of their respective districts and the Commissioner of their city. They discuss with the commissioner all the health-related matters of their districts or cities.

=== Major Hospitals of Sindh ===
1. Civil Hospital (Medical Superintendent Dr.Khalid Bukhari)
2. Sindh Government Qatar Hospital (Medical Superintendent Dr.Rashid Khanzada)
3. Sindh Government Lyari Hospital (Medical Superintendent Dr.Muhammad Jameel Mughal)
4. Sindh Government Hospital Korangi No.5 (Medical Superintendent Dr.Zafar Abbas)
5. Sindh Government Hospital Liaquatabad (Dr.Atique Qureshi)

== See also ==
- Ministry of National Health Services Regulation and Coordination
- Health care in Pakistan
- Health care in Karachi
- Punjab Health Department
- Ministry of Health Balochistan
- Pharmacy Council of Sindh
