= PS-105 Karachi East-IX =

Constituency of the Provincial Assembly of Sindh, Pakistan

- Constituency for the Provincial Assembly of Sindh
- Region: Ferozabad town (partly) of Karachi East District in Karachi
- Electorate: 162,582

Current constituency
- Member: Vacant
- Created from: PS-114 Karachi-XXVI (2002-2018); PS-104 Karachi East-VI (2018-2023) PS-105 Karachi East-IX (2023-

PS-105 Karachi East-IX (پی ایس-105، کراچی مشرقی-9) is a constituency of the Provincial Assembly of Sindh.

== General elections 2024 ==
Provincial election 2024: PS-105 Karachi East-IX
Party	Candidate	Votes	%	±%
PPP	Saeed Ghani	26,168	39.87	
GDA	Irfanullah Khan Marwat	20,111	30.64	
Independent	Hanif Khan (Note: Filed nomination papers as PTI candidate but ECP allowed him to run as an independent)	11,277	17.18	
TLP	Khalid Mahmood	3,227	4.92	
PML(N)	Shamim Begum	2,076	3.16	
Independent	Muhammad Mohsin	923	1.41	
Others	Others (twenty six candidates)	1,856	2.82	
Turnout		67,201	41.33	
Total valid votes		65,638	97.67	
Rejected ballots		1,563	2.33	
Majority		6,057	9.23	
Registered electors		162,582		
PPP hold				

== General elections 2018 ==
Provincial election 2018: PS-104 Karachi East-VI
Party	Candidate	Votes	%	±%
PPP	Saeed Ghani	27,635	37.53	
GDA	Irfanullah Khan Marwat	11,213	15.23	
PTI	Mansoor Ahmed Shaikh	10,208	13.86	
MQM-P	Khurram Shehzad	9,636	13.09	
TLP	Zahid Rasheed	5,399	7.33	
MMA	Zahoor Ul Haq	4,996	6.78	
Independent	Jamal Ud Din	1,215	1.65	
PSP	Shoukat Zaman Khan	912	1.24	
Independent	Shahid Saeed Bhatti	709	0.96	
Independent	Muhammad Zahid Jawed	361	0.49	
Independent	Saleem Murad	356	0.48	
Independent	Abdul Saeed	198	0.27	
Independent	Muhammad Kamran Khan	160	0.22	
MQM-H	Shaheen Adnan	137	0.19	
Independent	Shaista Qaiser	128	0.17	
PRHP	Taj Muhammad Hanfi	82	0.11	
Independent	Qamar Ahmed Khan	59	0.08	
Independent	Muhammad Javeed	48	0.07	
Independent	Farhan Ghani	45	0.06	
Independent	Jahangir Khan	35	0.05	
Independent	Farrukh Ahmed	29	0.04	
Independent	Muhammad Aslam	28	0.04	
Independent	Choudhary Muhammad Nawaz Olakh	27	0.04	
Move On Pakistan	Bashir Ahmed Mangnejo	19	0.03	
Majority		16,422	22.30	
Valid ballots		73,635		
Rejected ballots		1,175		
Turnout		74,810		
Registered electors		173,943		
hold				

== General elections 2013 ==
General election 2013: PS-114 Karachi-XXVI
Party	Candidate	Votes	%	±%
PML(N)	Irfanullah Khan Marwat	37,130		
MQM	Rauf Siddiqui	30305		
PTI	Israr Ahmed Abbasi	13807		
PPP	Sajjad Ahmed Pappi	3827		
PML(F)	Sardar Abdul Raheem	815		
PPP(SB)	Javeed Somro	453		
Independent	Farhan Ghani	237		
Independent	Ishtiaq Ali	77		
Independent	Asif Khan Marwat	75		
Independent	Tahir Ashraf Hashmi	68		
Independent	Zulfiqar Ali Qaim Khani	65		
Independent	Maqbool Masih	51		
Independent	Imtiaz Khan	29		
MQM-H	Shaheen Adnan	29		
Independent	Abdul Aziz Bindya Rana	27		
Independent	Tabish Hussain	25		
APML	Syed Farhan Ahmed	24		
PFP	Muhammad Hanif	23		
Independent	Zulfiqar Ali	12		
Independent	Khalid Mehmood	11		
Independent	Faiz Muhammad Shah	10		
Independent	Muhamamd Ibrahim	8		
TSH	Ejaz Ali	8		
Independent	Muhammad Javed Khan	5		
Independent	Muhammad Idress Gujjar Baba	0		
Total valid votes		87122	47.91	
Rejected ballots		2103		
Registered electors		186,203		

== See also ==
- PS-104 Karachi East-VIII
- PS-106 Karachi South-I
