= Balochistan Health Department =

Department of Government of Balochistan, Pakistan

Agency overview
- Jurisdiction: Balochistan, Pakistan
- Headquarters: Quetta, Balochistan
- Minister responsible: Faisal Jamali, Minister for Specialized Healthcare and Medical Education and Primary and Secondary Healthcare
- Parent agency: Government of Balochistan
- Website: Official website

Department of Health is a department of Government of Balochistan, Pakistan. The department is a standard body for providing public health, medical education, training and employment in the Balochistan.

It is headed by the Health Minister of Balochistan on democratic level, while controlled by the Secretary Health as well as the Director General Health Services Balochistan on bureaucratic level.

== See also ==
- Ministry of National Health Services Regulation and Coordination
- Health care in Pakistan
- Ministry of Public Health (Sindh)
- Punjab Health Department
