= Guzara District =

Guzara ولسوالی گذره
- District
- Location within Afghanistan
- Coordinates: 34°11′20″N 62°13′21″E
- Country: Afghanistan
- Province: Herat Province

Area
  - Total: 2,000 km^{2} (770 sq mi)

Population (2012)
  - Total: 142,700

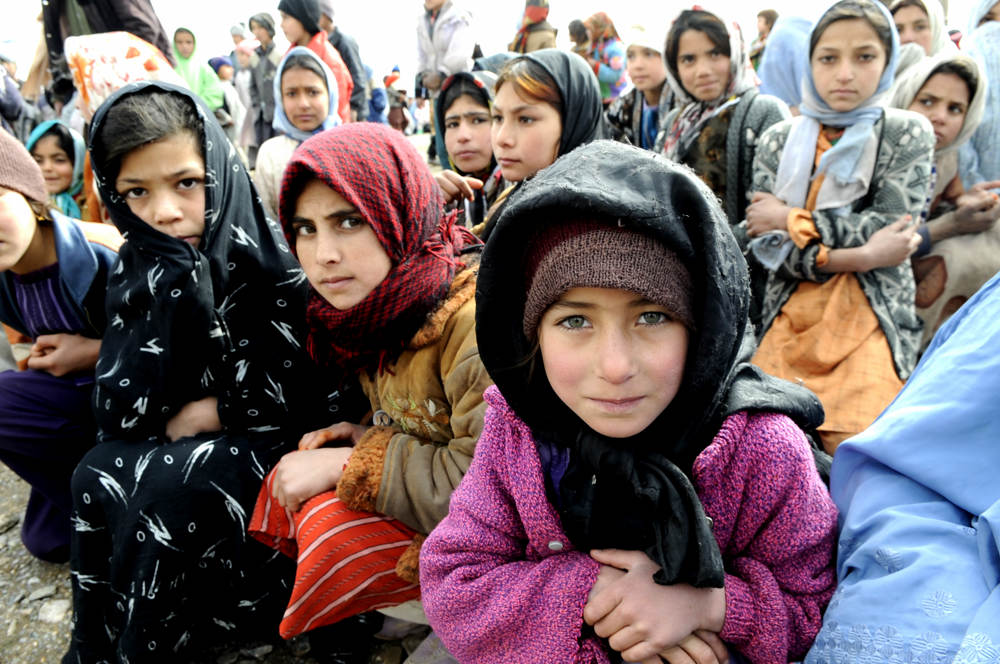
Children of Guzara District in 2009

Guzara (Gozareh) District (Persian: ولسوالی گذره) is situated in the center of Herat Province, Afghanistan, 10 km south of Herat. It borders Injil District to the north, Pashtun Zarghun District to the east, Adraskan District to the south and Zinda Jan District to the west. The district center Guzara (Gozareh) is on the main road Herat-Kandahar.

On 19 August 2025, an overcrowded passenger bus, possibly speeding, carrying migrants deported from Iran veered off the road and collided with a truck and motorcycle before catching fire on the Guzara District section of the Herat–Islam Qala Highway, an extension of the Afghanistan Ring Road. The crash killed at least 79 people, including 19 children, and injuring two others. It is one of country's deadliest accidents in recent years.
