= Chawkay District =

District of Kunar, Afghanistan

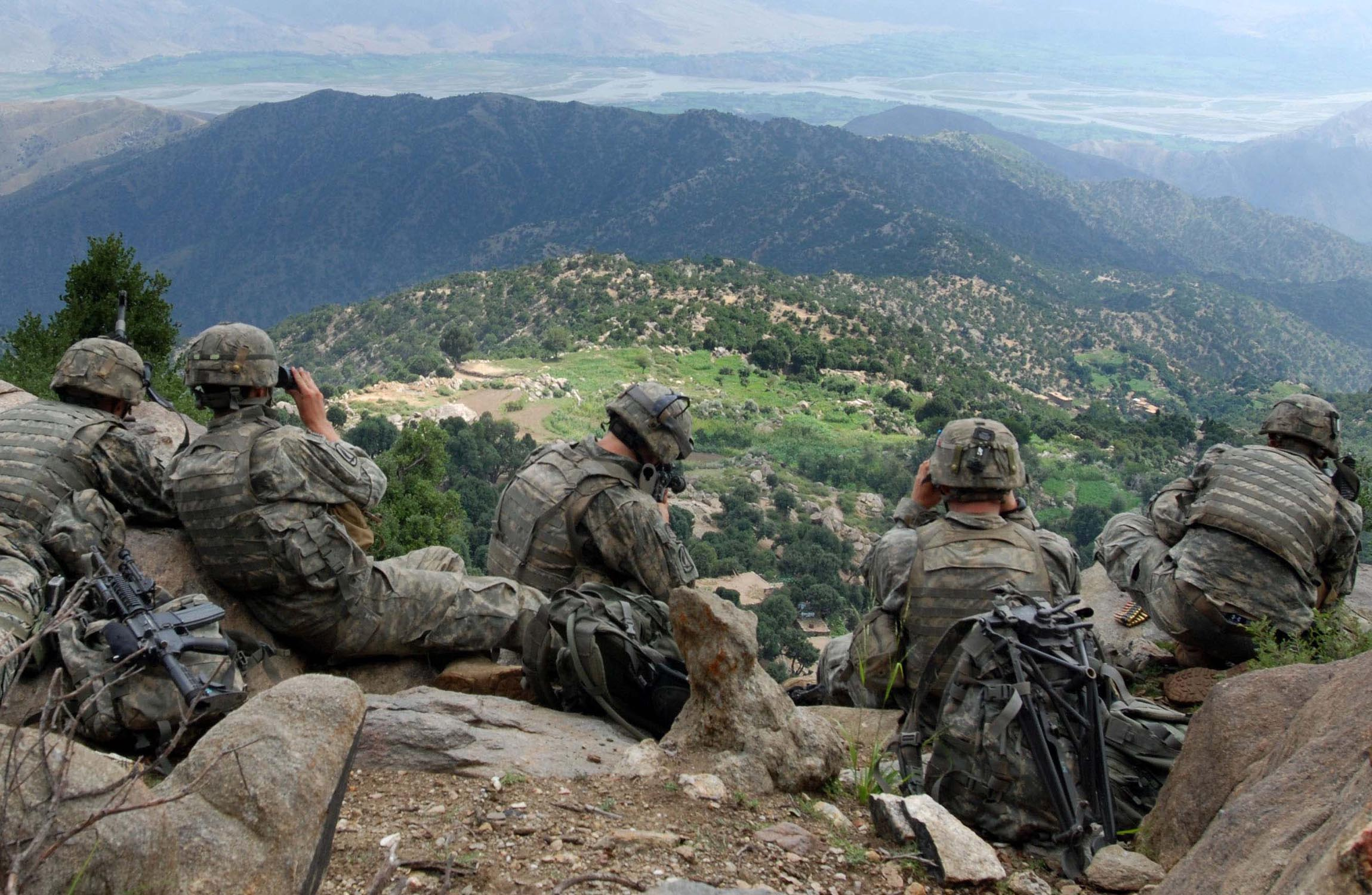
U.S. soldiers looking out for Taliban insurgents during Operation Destined Strike while other soldiers search a village below the Chowkay Valley in Kunar Province, Afghanistan.

Chawkay District (Pashto: چوکۍ) is situated in the central part of Kunar Province, Afghanistan. The population was reported in 2006 as 31,600. The district center is the village of Chawkay (34.6961°N 70.9247°E) at 726 m elevation in the valley of the Kunar River. Roughly 80% of the houses in the district were destroyed during the wars.

== See also ==
- Districts of Afghanistan
- Kunar Raid
