= Pharmacy Council of Sindh =

The Pharmacy Council of Sindh is a statutory and regulatory body of Sindh Province, Pakistan, established under the Drugs Act of 1967. The council is responsible for issuing licenses to Category-A pharmacists, conducting examinations of Category-B pharmacists and educating pharmacy technicians regarding documentation of medical stores.

The Pharmacy Council of Sindh is affiliated with the Pharmacy Council of Pakistan.
