= Richard Bennett (UN) =

New Zealand human rights expert

Richard Bennett is a New Zealand human rights expert. He has been the United Nations Special Rapporteur on the human rights situation in Afghanistan since 2022, following the Taliban's return to power.

== Career ==
Bennett has served the United Nations as representative of the UN High Commissioner for Human Rights and head of the human rights components of peacekeeping operations in Sierra Leone, Timor-Leste, and South Sudan, including twice in Afghanistan (2003–2007 and 2018–2019). For a time, he was an advisor to the Afghan Independent Human Rights Commission. From 2007 to 2010, Bennett was the representative of the UN High Commissioner for Human Rights in Nepal and head of the OHCHR Office there. He was also chief of staff of the UN Secretary-General's Sri Lanka Expert Panel and special adviser to the OHCHR in New York City.

Bennett worked for Amnesty International from 2014 to 2017, first as programme director for Asia and the Pacific and later as head of the UN Office in New York. Since mid-2019, he has worked as a consultant for UN human rights projects in Afghanistan, Myanmar and New York. Bennett is currently a visiting professor at the Raoul Wallenberg Institute in Lund, Sweden.

Bennett has held various positions in Afghanistan, including Chief of the Human Rights Service at the United Nations Assistance Mission in Afghanistan (UNAMA). An important part of his work was the protection and promotion of human rights, such as the protection of the civilian population, further development of the justice system, children's rights, rule of law, minority rights, protection of human rights activists and a variety of economic, social and cultural rights.

== Special Rapporteur on Afghanistan ==
On 7 October 2021, the UN Human Rights Council adopted the mandate for a UN Special Rapporteur on the situation of human rights in Afghanistan in Resolution 48/1 after the Taliban retook control of the country in August 2021. The mandate for Afghanistan was already in place until 2005. Richard Bennett was appointed as the first mandate holder on 1 April 2022 and took office on 1 May 2022.

In August 2022, he reported that the human rights situation in Afghanistan had steadily deteriorated since the Taliban took power. Women's rights were being massively suppressed, religious and ethnic minorities were being persecuted, enforced disappearances were widespread, as were summary executions, arbitrary detention and torture. There was a crackdown on the media and any form of protest. Afghanistan was the only country in which girls are not allowed to attend secondary school and women are excluded from university. The ongoing unrest has also caused a humanitarian crisis, as access to vital resources is lacking and food, water and medical care are in short supply. This is particularly dangerous for vulnerable people such as children and the elderly. The return of the Taliban to power has undone all the progress that has been made in the past two decades in the realisation of basic human rights and freedoms.

In his report of 9 February 2023, he again listed serious abuses and stated that the systematic violation of the rights of women and girls had become "normal". The discriminatory denial of the basic human rights of women and girls could amount to gender-specific persecution, a crime against humanity. The attacks on Hazara, Shiites and other religious minorities have continued. Bennett also documented the severe impact of the economic crisis on human rights, which was exacerbated by international sanctions and the sudden withdrawal of foreign aid. An estimated 18.9 million Afghans – half the population – were suffering from acute food shortages. This serious humanitarian crisis would be exacerbated by the Taliban's refusal to allow women to work.

On 21 August 2024, the Taliban barred Bennett from entering Afghanistan, stating that he was appointed "to spread propaganda and he is not someone whose words we can trust". Bennett issued a statement in response to the ban, calling the decision "a step backwards" and committing to continue documenting human rights violations and abuses.

On 26 March 2025, Bennett supported calls for FIFA to act against gender oppression in Afghanistan, where women footballers remain banned from competing. Exiled players, including team captain Mursal Sadat, urged FIFA to help reintegrate them into international football, emphasizing collaboration rather than confrontation.

Following the 2025 Afghanistan earthquake on 31 August, Bennett called on the Pakistani government to suspend its deportation of Afghan migrants in light of the disaster.
