= Sindh Archives =

Main repository for the provincial government of Sindh, Pakistan

- Interactive map of Sindh Archives
- 24.81547°N 67.02709°E
- Location: Karachi, Pakistan
- Established: 1976
- Affiliation: Culture, Tourism, Antiquities & Archives Department, Government of Sindh

Building information
- Building: Sindh Archives Building (former Commissioner’s Record Room, 1903)
- Construction date: 1903
- Website: archives.sindhculture.gov.pk

The Sindh Archives (Urdu: محفوظات سندھ) are the main repository for the provincial government of Sindh, Pakistan. They are located in Karachi.

== History ==
Sindh was annexed to British rule in the year 1843 and integrated with Bombay Presidency in 1847. Considering that proper preservation of all records regarding Indus Valley is necessary an accommodation was acquired within the compound of Government house (now Governor's House) and a record room was established there during 1853. Commissioner in Sindh was the Chief Officer of province at that time therefore Commissioner Office was entrusted with the responsibility to collect all important records. The records since 1820 onward were preserved at record room. The Commissioner's Record Branch was originally located in a bungalow situated within the cantonment limits. The record was moved to the house situated close to the government house in the same compound. In 1885, the Commissioner desired that the records of Survey Record Office Hyderabad be shifted to Karachi, owing to insecurity and unsuitability. The new accommodation was constructed in 1903, within the compound of commissioner's office. In 1904, Superintendent Land Records and Agriculture moved their office to Karachi but after one year's experience same was transferred back to Hyderabad, whole new arrangement was retained for Record room and Library of Commissioners Office. In 1923 the Record Room was extended as required, thus in next 6 years all the records were shifted from main building of the Office. The next years saw some more extensions, but after the separation of Sindh from Bombay Presidency in 1937, the Commissioners' Office ceased to be the prime office of the Province, and much of the attention previously given to the records was now available no more. This was followed by the emergence of Pakistan as an independent state including Sindh as its province.

In South Asia, the concept of archives as an independent discipline did not gain legitimacy until 1891, when the Imperial Record Department was established at Calcutta (Kolkata) and the subordinate record offices as well as in such offices in the Princely States.

Then need was felt to establish an archives at provincial level to preserve the records about the history of Sindh. In 1976, the subject of archives was allotted to newly created Culture Division. Sindh Archives became a full-fledged department in August 1988 under Abdul Hameed Akhund, first secretary of the new department. With the creation of the department, the activity of acquiring the records and equipments was launched. The record of the commissioner office was promised to be handed over to Sindh Archives by the then commissioner Karachi. These records were mainly placed in government press premises and were not in very good preserving condition. Sindh Archives were shifted in its present premises in 1992. In order to proceed with the technical aspects of work services of Mr. Martin Moirfiner Assistant Curator, British Museum was hired. Under his guidance the staff was instructed in handling of old records. In 2003, Sindh Archives was given under Information and Archives Department from Department of Culture, Sports, Tourism and Youth Affair. In order to improve the services of this institution and preservation of records etc. he envisaged two development schemes and got them approved from Government of Sindh. The development schemes were started on 1 July 2005. Apart from permanent employees staff have been working on contract under development projects have performed valuable services in modernizing this directorate resulting online existence with www.archives.sindhculture.gov.pk

== Publications ==
The following books were published under its authority:
