= 2012 Kunar airstrike and raid =

2012 NATO military operation

Raid on Kunar
- Part of the War in Afghanistan (2001–2021)
- Type: Airstrike and ground raid
- Location: Chawki district of Kunar province, Afghanistan
- Target: Suspected Taliban insurgents
- Date: February 17, 2012
- Executed by: USAF and NATO
- Outcome: mission failure
- Casualties: 6 killed

The raid on Kunar was a NATO operation which took place on February 17, 2012. Six civilians, including a woman and a child, were killed in the airstrike and ground raid near the Dewa Gul Valley, "a Taliban stronghold in the Chawki district of Kunar province".

Hundreds of Afghans in Chawki protested NATO's actions. President Hamid Karzai sent a delegation to investigate the incident; according to his office, witnesses confirmed that six civilians were killed in the action.

== See also ==
- Civilian casualties in the War in Afghanistan (2001–present)
