= Guzara =

- Location in Afghanistan
- Coordinates: 34°13′0″N 62°13′18″E
- Country: Afghanistan
- Province: Herat Province
- District: Guzara District
- Time zone: UTC+4:30

Guzara (Gozareh) is a village and the center of Guzara District in Herat Province, Afghanistan on 34.2167°N 62.2167°E at 992 m altitude. The Herat Airfield is very close to the village to the east.

== See also ==
- Herat Province
