= Syed Sardar Ali Shah =

Pakistani politician

- سيد سردار علي شاھ
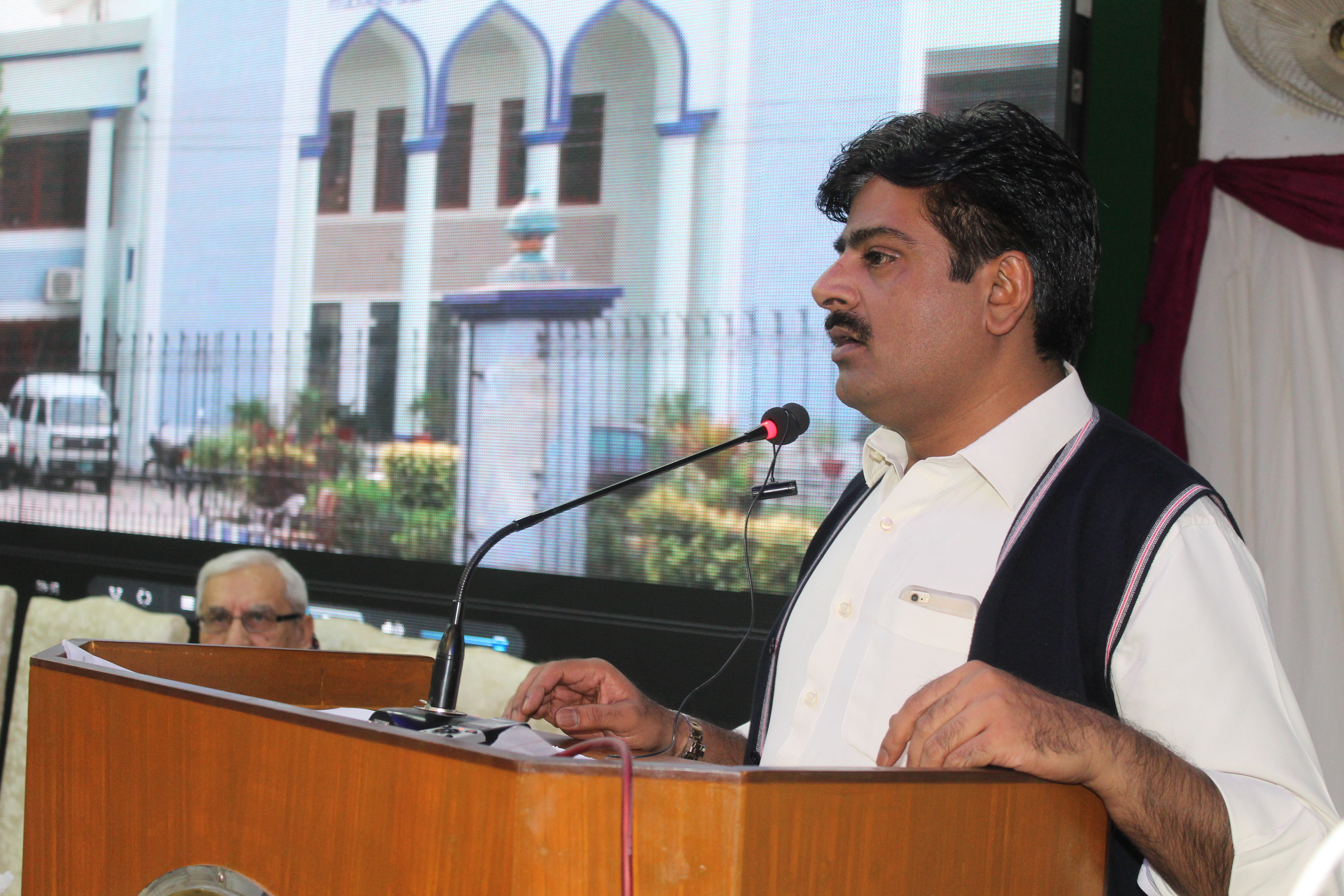
- Syed Sardar Ali Shah addressing on International Mother Language Day 2017

Provincial Minister of Sindh Education and Literacy
- In office 5 August 2021 – 11 August 2023
- Preceded by: Saeed Ghani
- In office 19 August 2018 – 3 February 2021
- Succeeded by: Saeed Ghani

Provincial Minister of Sindh for Culture, Tourism and Antiquities
- In office 19 August 2018 – 11 August 2023

Member of the Provincial Assembly of Sindh
- In office 13 August 2018 – 11 August 2023
- Constituency: PS-51 Umerkot-I
- In office 29 May 2013 – 28 May 2018
- Constituency: PS-69 (Umerkot-cum-Sanghar)

Personal details
- Born: 4 December 1974 (age 51) Umerkot District, Sindh, Pakistan
- Party: PPP (2013-present)

Syed Sardar Ali Shah (Sindhi: سيد سردار علي شاھ) is a Pakistani politician who served as the Provincial Minister of Sindh for Education, Culture, Tourism, and Antiquities and Archives. He had been a member of the Provincial Assembly of Sindh from 2013 to 2018, 2018 to 2023 and is also currently a member since 2024.

Previously, he served as Provincial Minister of Sindh for Culture, Tourism and Antiquities, and Archives between August 2016 - May 2018 and from August 2018 - August 2023 tenure as Minister for Education and Literacy Department along the previous portfolio for Culture and Tourism.

Aside from his political work, Shah owns a livestock farm, writes poetry, and contributes to columns on contemporary affairs

== Early life and education ==
He was born on 4 December 1974 in Umerkot District, Pakistan.

He holds degrees in Law, Civil Engineering (B.E.), and a Master's in Sociology. He has participated in national and international seminars, workshops, and conferences.

== Political career ==
He started his political career while contesting as UC Nazim in local bodies election in 2001-2002 and was elected from his native village UC.

He was elected to the Provincial Assembly of Sindh as a candidate of PPP from Constituency PS-69 (Umerkot-cum-Sanghar) in the 2013 Pakistani general election. He received 35,069 votes and defeated Muhammad Jadam Mangrio. On 30 July 2016, he was inducted into the provincial Sindh cabinet of Chief Minister Syed Murad Ali Shah and was appointed as Provincial Minister of Sindh for Culture, Tourism and Antiquities. In May 2017, he was given the additional ministerial portfolio of Archives.

He was re-elected to the Provincial Assembly of Sindh as a candidate of PPP from Constituency PS-51 (Umerkot-I) with a marginal victory in the 2018 Pakistani general election.

On 19 August 2018, he was inducted into the provincial Sindh cabinet of Chief Minister Syed Murad Ali Shah and was appointed as Provincial Minister of Sindh for Education with the additional ministerial portfolio of Culture, Tourism, and Antiquities.

Later, he was succeeded by Saeed Ghani as education minister on 3 February 2020. He was again appointed as Minister of Education on 5 August 2021. During his second tenure he led the biggest ever recruitment campaign of over 55000 combined number of Junior Elementary School Teachers (JEST) and Primary School Teachers (PST) in Pakistan's history and that was done purely on merit through an aptitude qualifying test conducted by highly reputed third party institute IBA Sukkur.

Another key initiative goes to his account is introduction of the Teachers Licensing Policy which has been duly approved by Sindh Cabinet in May 2023, Ministry of Education in Sindh becomes the first province to introduce the Teachers Licensing in Country.

Mr. Shah has won the general election 2024 for 3rd consecutive time from PS-49 Distt. Umerkot with a margin of over 25,000 votes and became member of Provincial assembly of Sindh and later inducted as provincial minister in Chief Minister Murad Ali Shah's first cabinet sworn in on 12 March 2024 as Minister for Education and Literacy department and with additional portfolio of Mines and Minerals Development Sindh.
