= Azra Fazal Pechuho =

Pakistani politician

Minister of Sindh for Health
- In office 13 March 2024
- In office 19 August 2018 – 11 August 2023

Minister of Sindh for Population Welfare
- In office 13 March 2024
- In office 19 August 2018 – 11 August 2023

Member of the Provincial Assembly
- In office 13 August 2018 – 11 August 2023
- Constituency: PS-37 Nawabshah-I

Member of the National Assembly
- In office 18 November 2002 – 31 May 2018
- Constituency: NA-213 (Nawabshah-I)

Member of the Provincial Assembly
- Incumbent
- Assumed office 25 February 2024
- Constituency: PS-36 Shaheed Benazirabad-I

Personal details
- Born: 21 February 1953 (age 73) Larkana, Sindh, Pakistan
- Party: PPP (2008-present)
- Spouse: Dr. Fazlullah Pechuho
- Relatives: Zardari family

Azra Fazal Pechuho (Urdu: عذرا فضل پیچوہو; née Zardari; born 21 February 1953) is a Pakistani politician who was the Provincial Minister of Sindh for Health, and Population Welfare, in office from August 2018 till August 2023 and again from March 2024. She was member of the Provincial Assembly of Sindh from August 2018 till August 2023. She was a member of the National Assembly of Pakistan, from 2002 to May 2018. She is serving as member of Provincial Assembly of Sindh since February 2024.

== Early life and education ==
She was born on 21 February 1953 in Larkana, Sindh, Pakistan, to Hakim Ali Zardari and Bilquis Sultana. She has three siblings, Asif Ali Zardari, Fauzia Abbasi and Faryal Talpur She is a physician by profession and has done MBBS from the Dow Medical College.

She is married to Dr. Fazlullah Pechuho and has a son, Muhammad Pechuho.

== Political career ==
Pechuho was elected to the National Assembly of Pakistan as a candidate of Pakistan Peoples Party (PPP) from Constituency NA-213 (Nawabshah-I) in the 2002 Pakistani general election. She received 75,237 votes and defeated Syed Zahid Hussain Shah, a candidate of Pakistan Muslim League (Q) (PML-Q).

She was not a popular politician until the assassination of Benazir Bhutto in 2007. After the assassination, she became the chancellor of Shaheed Zulfiqar Ali Bhutto Institute of Science and Technology (SZABIST).

Pechuho was re-elected to the National Assembly from NA-213 (Nawabshah-I) as a candidate of PPP in the 2008 Pakistani general election. She received 108,404 votes and defeated Syed Zahid Hussain Shah, a candidate of Pakistan Muslim League (F) (PML-F).

Pechuho was re-elected to the National Assembly from Constituency NA-213 (Nawabshah-I) as a candidate of PPP in the 2013 Pakistani general election. She received 113,199 votes and defeated Inayat Ali Rind, a candidate of Muttahida Qaumi Movement (MQM).

She was elected to the Provincial Assembly of Sindh as a candidate of PPP from Constituency PS-37 (Shaheed Benazirabad-I) in the 2018 Pakistani general election.

On 19 August, she was inducted into the provincial Sindh cabinet of Chief Minister Syed Murad Ali Shah and was made Provincial Minister of Sindh for Health with the additional ministerial portfolio of Population Welfare.
