= Karnataka Coastal Development Authority =

Indian state government body in Karnataka

Coastal Development Authority
Agency overview
- Formed: 2009
- Jurisdiction: Government of Karnataka
- Headquarters: Karnataka, India
- Website: Official website

Coastal Development Authority is a government body of State Government of Karnataka. Its headquarters is situated in Mangalore, Karnataka. The authority works to develop of the three coastal districts of Karnataka named Dakshina Kannada, Udupi and Uttara Kannada.

== History ==
Coastal Development Authority was established in 2009. Mattar Ratnakar Hegde is the chairman of the authority. The State Government had granted ₹35 crore (US$3.6 million) to the authority for the year of 2022–2023.
