= Kamran Tessori =

Pakistani politician and businessman

34th Governor of Sindh
- In office 10 October 2022 – 12 March 2026
- President: Arif Alvi; Asif Ali Zardari
- Prime Minister: Shehbaz Sharif; Anwaar ul Haq Kakar; Shehbaz Sharif
- Preceded by: Imran Ismail; Agha Siraj Durrani
- Succeeded by: Nehal Hashmi

Personal details
- Born: Karachi, Sindh, Pakistan
- Party: MQM-P (2022-present)
- Other political affiliations: MQM-P (2017-2018); PML(F) (2013-2017)

Muhammad Kamran Khan Tessori (Urdu: کامران ٹیسوری) is a Pakistani politician and businessman, who served as the Governor of Sindh since October 2022 till March 2026. Tessori is a member of the MQM-P party.

== Personal life ==
Tessori is an ethnic Muhajir, and belongs to the Tessori family, who runs an international gold business called "Tessori Gold". He is the only politician in his family.

== Political career ==
He established contacts with Arbab Ghulam Rahim who was the Chief Minister of Sindh at the time in order to enter politics. He was later considered a close aide to him.

The Muttahida Qaumi Movement (MQM) has put forward Sindh Governor Kamran Tessori's name as a potential candidate for the interim Prime Minister role. In a recent meeting with Prime Minister Shehbaz Sharif in Islamabad, the MQM delegation, led by Khalid Maqbool Siddique, had a warm reception. The delegation included Tessori, Dr Farooq Sattar, and Syed Aminul Haq.

== Arrest ==
He was arrested in 2008 for being involved in a real estate land scam. The land which was 80 acres and a historical graveyard, was allegedly allotted to him by Arbab Ghulam Rahim who was the 27th Chief Minister of Sindh at the time to build a new housing society called Gold City. He escaped police custody during a shootout while he was being shifted from Karachi to Badin, which led to another case being filed against him.

== Controversies ==
In 2017, it was reported that a National Accountability Bureau inquiry against Tessori into a Rs172.3 million default case was still pending in court.

In 2017, a member of MQM-P Faisal Subzwari said that the party (MQM-P) was not for sale, implying that Tessori who is a wealthy businessman involved in gold & commercial real estate businesses, tried using his money to influence party decisions in order to receive a ticket in the Senate.

In 2018, Hanif Merchant, a gold trader based in Dubai, approached the Federal Investigation Agency (FIA) to request action against Tessori regarding his purported involvement in a gold fraud case.

Political offices
Preceded by Agha Siraj Durrani	Governor of Sindh; Incumbent	Succeeded by Incumbent
