= Sindh Information Department =

Pakistani provincial government entity

Agency overview
- Jurisdiction: Sindh, Pakistan
- Headquarters: Karachi
- Minister responsible: Sharjeel Memon, Provincial Minister of Sindh for Information
- Agency executive: Nadeem Ur Rehman Memon, Secretary Sindh Information Department
- Parent agency: Government of Sindh
- Website: Official website

The Sindh Information Department is a provincial government entity in Sindh, Pakistan. Its primary role is to ensure effective and strategic media coverage of government activities through both electronic and print platforms. To achieve this, the department collaborates closely with the media and journalists. It maintains regular communication with the Governor, the Chief Secretary’s administrative departments, and other government officials regarding press coverage. Additionally, the department prepares weekly reports on television coverage related to Sindh.

== Department sections ==
=== Press information section ===
The press information section issues handouts, denials and clarifications to the print and electronic media, which normally get prominent coverage in national and regional news. Press briefings by various administrative officers are made at news conferences, and interviews with senior government officers are arranged regularly to highlight developmental activities as well as efforts to improve law and order, the campaign of anti-terrorist activity, and other steps taken by the Government of Sindh.

A media projection plan, which focuses on the following points for proper and better projection of government activities, has been circulated to all departmental offices:

1. Press conferences and briefings be held by the governor, ministers, chief secretary, secretaries, heads of autonomous bodies, heads of local councils, IGP, DIGs, DCs, SSPs once every month
2. Open kutchery be held by the governor, chief secretary, secretaries, head of autonomous bodies, head of local councils, IGP, DIGs, SSPs once every month
3. Each department should send its development programmer of the year (scheme-wise) in narrative form for continuous flow of reports connected with welfare of the people
4. Material relating to the departmental briefings and meetings be supplied to PROs attached to the departments for effective publicity
5. Visit and inspection of the ministers, and secretaries where there are no ministers, be publicised
6. Seminars and conventions be arranged and organised to ascertain the needs, demands and grievances of different segments of the population, for feedback to government for formulating policies covering all segments of the society, (e.g. agriculturists, labour leaders, industrialists, educationists, NGOs etc.)
7. Regular contacts with journalists be maintained through PROs to publicise the government's point of view so that, if at any time adverse news is published by any journalist, they should have the official view on the subject, as well as encouraging positive publicity
8. The education, social welfare, sports & culture department may be requested to organize functions in the area of their activities, duly covered by journalists through PROs
9. The related departments should organise meetings of journalists, writers, ulema, intellectuals, and consumer associations to earn their good will, and in order to create a sense of participation among the people
10. Rebuttals to negative news should be issued immediately by the relevant department
11. Effective relations be maintained with journalists through perpetual contact to establish a consensus of ideas among them
12. Aggressive publicity through columnists, writers, and public opinion moulders be ensured to counter criticism
13. Critical analysis of newspapers be undertaken to ascertain their inclination to favour or disfavour government, and PR offensives be initiated to mould their attitudes towards favouring government

If the above guidelines are followed by the departmental offices concerned, it is expected that Sindh Government's coverage will occupy the major portion of print media, because the number of officers who have to hold open Katcheries every month and involve themselves in other activities of public importance, exceeds 100

This section also arranges photographic coverage of official engagements of the Governor, the Sindh Chief Minister's advisor, Chief Secretary, administrative secretaries and other functionaries of various departments

=== Publications section ===
The monthly publications of the Information Department, namely "Izhar" (Urdu) and "Paigham" (Sindhi), which ceased in 1993, have been re-published since May, 1999. Efforts are underway to market them through the usual trading outlets.

=== Research and reference section ===
This section has also been fully reorganised. It now keeps government and semi-government departments informed of the miseries and hardships of people who make their wishes known to the relevant authorities through the print media. In keeping with this policy, press clippings regarding public demands and complaints, law and order, political statements (positive or negative), editorials, articles and news items of public interest are submitted to the chief executive of the province. Press clippings of different nature are also sent to the media advisor and the chief secretary.

Besides the above, press clippings pertaining to various Nation Building Departments, are sent daily to the heads of administrative departments for their attention. The rebuttals and clarifications received from the concerned departments are also sent to the print media for publicising the government's point of view.

=== Advertising section ===
This section processes advertisements placed in newspapers by various Sindh Government departments. A revised advertising policy was approved in 2000 by the provincial cabinet of Sindh. This policy is aimed at economising on space and cutting down expenditure drastically.

Several daily newspapers for which the Information Department processes government advertising, as well as those on the central media list approved by the federal government and certified by ABC, have been shortlisted in consultation with ISPR and APNS to contain releases of advertisements to dummy newspapers. A review committee, headed by the Deputy Director, ISPR, 5 Corps Headquarters, Karachi, has also been constituted to undertake periodical reviews of newspapers for the release of government advertisements.

The Information Department owes some Rs.134.22 million for advertising, unpaid due to lack of funding. In order to settle the outstanding dues, the Finance Department has so far provided a sum of Rs.60 million, out of which about Rs.20 million has been disbursed, while the remaining amount is being drawn from the audit. The disbursement of payment is processed and approved by the committee headed by the Deputy Director, ISPR, 5 Corps Headquarters, Karachi, and represented by the Finance Department by the Deputy Secretary.

=== Accreditation section ===
This section of the Sindh Information Department provides professional training and financial support to journalists as well as certifying the journalists at the provincial level. It also issues accreditation cards to journalists.

=== Film section ===
The Film Section now remains very active as it has been made to cover all important official functions, including those of the Governor of Sindh, chief ministers, chief secretary, sindh and administrative secretaries. Special reports and different programmers have prepared and made broadcasts through PTV/Radio Pakistan to motivate the public in securing their support for the government efforts to improve law and order, eliminate terrorism and other social activities. Similarly, TV coverage of the province is videotaped and send to the Governor, Chief Secretary and to Log Area Headquarters on a weekly basis.

The job of this section also includes scrutinising scripts to ensure that these do not contain any material that might further:

1. the commission of any offence
2. false rumors
3. condemnation of the creation of Pakistan
4. hatred or condemnation of the government
5. feelings of enmity
6. damage to relations between the government of Pakistan and other governments
7. indecency or obscenity

=== Administration section ===
The Administration Section has been reactivated. There are daily meetings to discuss actions on a day-to-day basis of important matters, with weekly follow-up meetings to review the disposal of government business and its implementation status.

=== Press section ===
This section has been completely reorganized to keep monitoring the English, Urdu and Sindhi press, a summary of which is prepared and sent on daily to the Governor, Chief Secretary and Log Area Headquarters. Weekly and monthly progress reports of the activities being carried out by the Information Department, including the Divisional Headquarters, are also dealt with by this department. The following additional functions are also the responsibility of press section:-

1. Issuance of NOCs for the declaration of various publications
2. Making recommendations for the cancellation of declarations to concerned authorities
3. Monitoring of press publications through gratis copies

== Press laws ==
The now defunct West Pakistan Press and Publication Ordinance 1963, and the Registration of Printing Press and Publications Ordinance 1990, remained in force until 1996 when, on 2 November 1996, a new ordinance, the Press and Publication Ordinance, was promulgated.

The ordinance of 1996, having not been extended, lapsed under the provisions of article 89 of the Constitution of Pakistan. According to the Advocate General, Sindh, the "previous ordinance of 1963 has automatically been revived by virtue of Article 264 of the Constitution of Pakistan." This view has been endorsed by the Law Department.

The above law is being considered by the press as black law. The matter was discussed in the inter-provincial ministers' conference held on 12 February 1999, which had decided to examine and suggest amendments (if any) in the drafts of the following proposed laws: a) Press Protection and Facilitation Act, 1997 (which would repeal the defunct West Pakistan Press and Publications Ordinance, 1990) b) Press Council and Enforcement of Code of Ethics for Press, Publications and News Agencies Act

The draft comments offered by the Information Department, Government of Sindh, duly vetted by the Law Department, were sent to the Ministry of Information and Media Development, Government of Pakistan.

The matter was also discussed in the consultative and coordination meeting held on 8 February 2000, in which the need for creating a law for news agencies was acknowledged.

== Divisional and District Offices ==
The divisional and district offices perform the same functions at the divisional or district level with which constant coordination is maintained to monitor activity.

== Links between the Information Department and the electronic media ==
The Sindh Information Department has strong and close relations with print media, as well as enhancing electronic media of the country in manipulating public opinion. The film section of the department is working closely with electronic media. It can help in educating the masses. The mobile film unit of the department held film shows at various places in the interior of Sindh. These shows were evoked interest in a large number of people.

=== Television ===
The Sindh Information Department provides more films and news to PTV because it a national television channel, but the trend is rapidly changing with the emergence of private television channels. The Department is enjoying influential relations with the national television broadcaster (PTV).

=== Radio ===
The Sindh Information Department provides news to Pakistan radio in the same way it does for television insofar as it provides comparatively more news for Pakistan national radio than it does for private FM radio stations.

== See also ==
- Sindh Coastal Development Authority
