= Sindh Education and Literacy Department =

Pakistani provincial ministry

Minister of Education and Literacy of Sindh
- Emblem of Government of Sindh

- Flag of Government of Sindh
- Incumbent; Syed Sardar Ali Shah since 12 March 2024
- Department of Education and Literacy
- Reports to: Chief Minister of Sindh
- Residence: Karachi
- Seat: Sindh
- Appointer: Chief Minister of Sindh with Provincial Assembly of Sindh advice and consent
- Term length: 5 years
- Website: Official Website

The Education and Literacy Department is a key division of the Government of Sindh, Pakistan, responsible for overseeing the provincial's education system. Its primary role is to manage educational affairs within Sindh and coordinate with the Federal Government and donor agencies to promote education. The department supervises primary education while managing secondary education, technical education, incentive programs, and various development initiatives.

On 6 October 2016, the Government of Sindh reorganised the Education and Literacy Department into two distinct entities: the College Education Department and the School Education Department, each led by its own Secretary.

== Facts ==
There are 327 public sector Colleges are functioning under the College Education Department of Sindh and 42,900 Primary Schools, 2,429 Elementary Schools and 2,065 High Schools under the department.

== Autonomous Bodies ==
=== Reform Support Unit ===
Reform Support Unit was established to build the institutional capability of the Department of Education.

==== Girls Stipend ====
The Education & Literacy Department initiated distribution of stipends to female students in rural area to increase literacy rate, under the Sindh Structural Adjustment Credit a program of World Bank.

=== Sindh Textbook Board ===
Production and publication of textbooks and supplementary reading material relating to textbooks.

=== Bureau of Curriculum ===
Bureau of Curriculum & Extension Wing is responsible for curriculum development.

=== Sindh Education Foundation ===
The Sindh Education Foundation is an autonomous body to encourage and promote education in the private sector operating on non-profit basis.

=== Provincial institute of Teacher Education ===
Provincial institute of Teacher Education was established in 1995 with help of Asian Development Bank, as a teacher education institute.

=== Sindh Teachers Education Development Authority ===
Sindh Teachers Education Development Authority oversee and regulate the teacher training activities and to maintain the standards of the trainings and the training providers.

=== Sindh Basic Education Program ===
SBEP is a program of the department and USAID under which 120 schools will be constructed by USAID in Sindh's under developed areas. The program is valued around $155 million.

== See also ==
- Education in Pakistan
