= Ahmadullah Muttaqi =

Afghan Taliban politician

Ahmadullah Muttaqi احمدالله متقی

Deputy Minister of Public and Strategic Relations
- Incumbent
- Assumed office 2021
- Prime Minister: Mohammad Hassan Akhund
- Leader: Hibatullah Akhundzada

Personal details
- Party: Taliban
- Occupation: Politician, Taliban member

Maulvi Ahmadullah Muttaqi Pashto: مولوي احمدالله متقي is an Afghan Taliban politician who is currently serving as Deputy Minister of Public and Strategic Relations. He has also served as acting director of information and culture for Kandahar and multimedia branch chief of the cultural commission.
