= 2025 Afghan deportation from Iran =

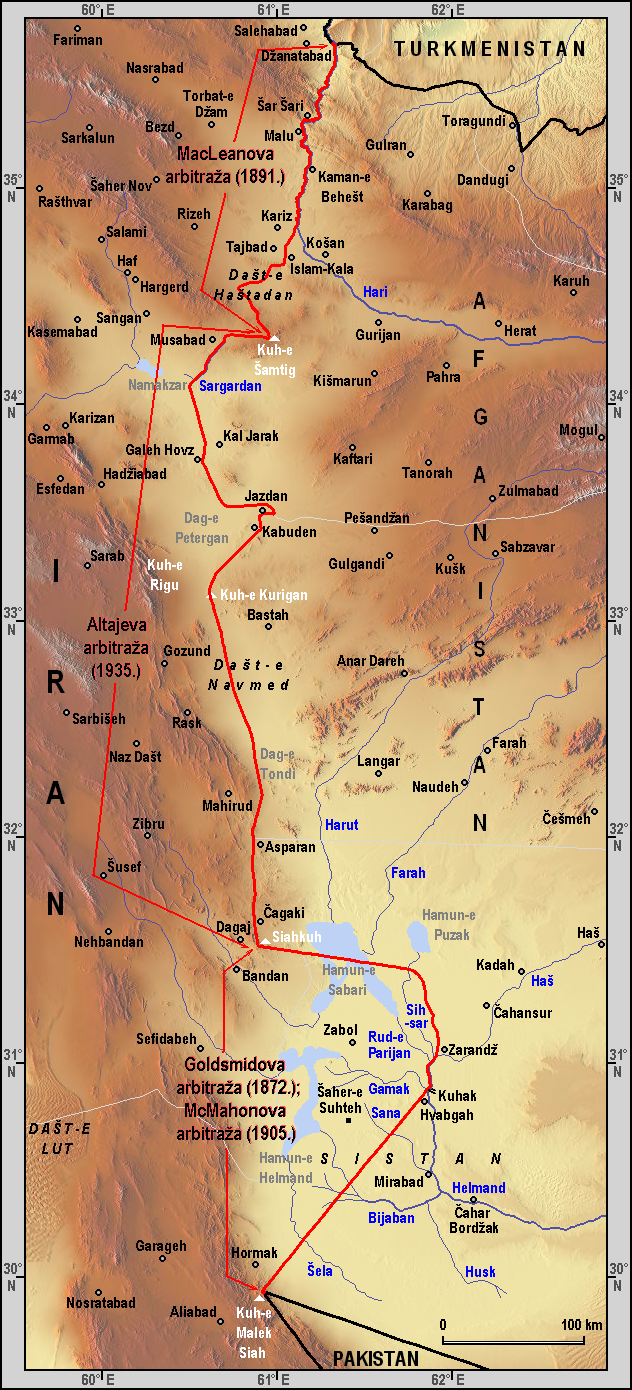
- Border of Iran and Afghanistan (tripoint with Turkmenistan in the north and Pakistan in the south)
- Date: June 2025–present
- Location: Afghanistan–Iran border
- Type: Forced deportation
- Cause: Alleged national security concerns; espionage claims
- Participants: Iran
- Deaths: At least 79 (Herat road crash on 19 August 2025)
- Injuries: Over 1.8 million Afghan refugees and migrants deported (as of December 2025)
- Over 1.8 million Afghan refugees and migrants deported (as of December 2025)

The 2025 deportation of Afghans from Iran is a mass deportation effort targeting undocumented Afghan migrants and refugees from Iran. While part of a broader campaign announced earlier in the year, the deportations sharply accelerated in June and July 2025, following the Twelve-Day War between Iran and Israel. The International Organization for Migration (IOM) reported that over half a million Afghans were deported in a 16-day period, in what was described as potentially one of the largest forced movements of a population in the decade. According to sources, Iran's goal is to increase it to 4 million Afghans. As of July 2025, around 1.1 million people have been deported.

Iranian authorities cited national security as the primary justification, leveraging anecdotal claims that Afghans had acted as spies for Israel during the conflict. The campaign triggered a severe humanitarian crisis at the Afghanistan–Iran border and drew widespread condemnation for its violation of international law, particularly the principle of non-refoulement.

== Background ==
For four decades, following decades of war and instability in Afghanistan, Iran has hosted one of the world's largest refugee populations. Following the Taliban's return to power in 2021, the number of Afghans in Iran was estimated to be between 4 and 6 million, many of whom were undocumented. Throughout their time in Iran, some Afghans have faced discrimination, restrictions on freedom, limited legal protection, and human rights abuses.

Over the years, Iran has established a pattern of mass deportations of Afghan refugees from Iran.

In the early 1990s, following the collapse of the Democratic Republic of Afghanistan in 1992 and amid growing economic and social pressures within Iran, Afghan refugees increasingly faced systematic harassment by Iranian law enforcement. This pressure campaign manifested in various forms: children were barred from attending public schools, identity documents were confiscated, and Afghans lacking legal status were subjected to mass deportations, physical abuse, and extortion.

In response to the influx of refugees and to formalize their presence, Iranian authorities issued more than 500,000 temporary registration cards to undocumented or newly arrived Afghans in 1993. Though initially renewable, these cards were ultimately invalidated in 1996, leaving many vulnerable once again to removal.

By 1999, the state deported an estimated 100,000 undocumented Afghans. Deportation campaigns, often targeting undocumented residents, continued sporadically. A significant escalation occurred in April 2007 when Iran launched an unprecedented crackdown, arresting nearly 490,000 Afghans by June 2008. Detainees were held in deportation camps, often for days, before being deported. Reports detailed widespread abuses: families were separated, individuals were beaten or mistreated, and many were forced to leave their homes with little to no notice. After the Taliban takeover in August 2021, repatriations surged. In 2022, about 485,000 Afghans deported, 2023 saw over 650,000. From March 2024 to March 2025, Iran deported 1.2 million Afghans.

== Pretext and contributing factors ==
The Iranian government has long regarded the large Afghan refugee population as a liability. Following the June 2025 Twelve-Day War, the government intensified its anti-immigrant rhetoric, blaming Afghans for security failures and accusing them of espionage for Israel. Iranian state media aired footage of an alleged Afghan "spy" confessing to his activities, though no supporting evidence was provided.

Critics and international observers suggested that the espionage claims were a baseless pretext for fulfilling a long-held ambition to reduce the Afghan population and to deflect internal dissent by scapegoating a vulnerable minority. Arafat Jamal, the UNHCR representative for Afghanistan, stated, "perhaps the Afghans are being scapegoated and some of the anger is being taken out on them."

Economic pressures also played a role. With Iran's economy suffering under international sanctions, rising inflation, and unemployment, public calls to deport Afghan refugees, who were often blamed by many Iranian citizens and media outlets for taking jobs, had increased.

== Deportation campaign ==
=== Scale and timeline ===
On 6 June 2025, the Iranian government announced a one-month deadline for all undocumented Afghan refugees to leave the country or face arrest and deportation. The campaign accelerated dramatically after the conflict with Israel. The IOM reported that 508,426 Afghans were deported between 24 June and 9 July, with daily crossings peaking at 51,000. The International Federation of The Red Cross and Red Crescent stated that over 800,000 Afghans had returned from Iran since the beginning of 2025.

Iranian authorities deported approximately 1.6 million undocumented Afghan migrants between January and October 2025.

=== Methods ===
Iranian authorities executed mass raids, established checkpoints, and conducted workplace inspections. Testimonies from deportees described police rounding them up from homes and streets, often in the middle of the night, and taking them to overcrowded detention centers. One deportee told The Guardian, "They came in the middle of the night. I begged them to give me just two days to collect my things. But they didn’t listen. They threw us out like garbage."

In detention centers, deportees reported beatings, extortion, and being denied food and water. One young man stated, "they would beat us up, they would abuse us." There were widespread reports of officials destroying legal documents, including passports and valid visas, to prevent any challenge to the deportation. The deportees were then forcibly marched onto buses and transported to the Afghan border.

==== Herat road crash ====
On 19 August 2025, an overcrowded passenger bus, possibly speeding, carrying migrants deported from Iran veered off the road and collided with a truck and motorcycle before catching fire on the Guzara District section of the Herat–Islam Qala Highway, an extension of the Afghanistan Ring Road. Of the total 81 passengers, the crash killed at least 79 people, including 19 children, and injuring two others. It is one of country's deadliest crash in recent years.

== Humanitarian crisis ==
The mass deportations created a severe humanitarian crisis at the Islam Qala border crossing in Herat Province. Tens of thousands of people, many of them women and children, were left stranded in extreme heat, with temperatures exceeding 50°C (122°F), leading to deaths from exhaustion and dehydration. Mihyung Park of the IOM described the scene as "thousands of people under the sun... It is quite dire."

Aid agencies were overwhelmed. The IOM stated its ability to provide aid was severely hindered, reaching only 10 percent of those in need. The UNHCR warned that its operations were severely underfunded and might be forced to halt.

=== Effects on women and children ===
The crisis disproportionately affected women and children. In June alone, UNICEF reported that over 5,000 unaccompanied or separated Afghan children were returned from Iran. For women and girls, returning to Afghanistan meant facing the Taliban's oppressive system of "gender apartheid". With laws prohibiting women from travelling or working without a male guardian (mahram), many deported single women and widows found themselves stranded at the border, unable to continue their journey or access aid.

== Legal analysis ==
Human rights organizations and legal experts argued that the mass deportations constituted grave breaches of international law. The Center for Human Rights in Iran stated the actions amounted to collective punishment.

== Responses ==
=== Iran ===
The Iranian government defended its actions on the grounds of national security. A government spokesperson stated, "We’ve always striven to be good hosts, but national security is a priority, and naturally illegal nationals must return." Other officials claimed the returns would be gradual and dignified, respecting their "neighbors and brothers in faith".

In an early July 2025 television interview, Mustafa Kavakebian, a former Iranian MP, claimed that the deportation of Afghans from Iran for security reasons is false, while the real reason was "deep Western infiltration" through the alleged espionage activities of French journalist Catherine Perez-Shakdam. On 20 July it was reported that legal proceedings were initiated against him for his claims.

=== Afghanistan ===
==== Taliban government ====
The Taliban leadership publicly called on Iran to allow Afghans to return with respect and in a gradual manner, noting that the country lacked the resources to support a sudden mass influx. The Taliban's Prime Minister, Hassan Akhund, asked Iran to avoid "humiliating behaviour" that could lead to "hatred between the two nations."

==== Afghan civil society ====
In the absence of a robust official response, Afghan citizens organized grassroots aid efforts. In Herat, businessmen and residents formed convoys of private cars to transport thousands of deportees from the border for free, while others provided food, water, and temporary shelter.

=== UN ===
The UN and its refugee agency (UNHCR) warned that the forced return of Afghans risks further destabilizing Afghanistan, which is already facing a humanitarian crisis with over 29 million in need of aid. Richard Bennett, the UN Special Rapporteur on human rights in Afghanistan, condemned the "incitement to discrimination & violence" and the use of "dehumanising language" against Afghans in Iran.

=== Other international and civil society responses ===
The deportations drew condemnation from numerous international figures and organizations.

Hannah Neumann, a member of the European Parliament, called the deportations "illegal" and an "expulsion by force and terror."

Narges Mohammadi, an imprisoned Iranian Nobel Peace Prize laureate, issued a statement from prison criticizing the deportations as a violation of Iran's international commitments.

The Iranian Writers' Association and other Iranian civil society groups condemned the "racist" treatment of migrants and called for an end to the deportations.

== See also ==
- Afghans in Iran
- Anti-Afghan sentiment
- Deportation of undocumented Afghans from Pakistan
- Afghanistan–Iran relations
- 2025 hunger crisis in Afghanistan
