= Balochistan Coastal Development Authority =

Agency overview
- Formed: 12 February, 1998

The Balochistan Coastal Development Authority (BCDA) is dedicated to fostering the growth and financial well-being of the coastal region in Balochistan. Its primary objective is to execute a range of development initiatives along the coastal areas of Balochistan, with the aim of enhancing economic activities, generating employment for the local population, and boosting tourism.

== History ==
The BCDA was created through a law called the Balochistan Coastal Development Authority Act, 1998. This law, which was passed on 12 February 1998, was made to establish an authority responsible for planning, developing, preserving, monitoring, constructing, operating, managing, and maintaining the coastal areas in Balochistan.

== See also ==
- Sindh Coastal Development Authority
