= Nehal Hashmi =

Governor of Sindh

- نہال ہاشمی

35th Governor of Sindh
- Incumbent
- Assumed office 13 March 2026
- President: Asif Ali Zardari
- Prime Minister: Shehbaz Sharif
- Preceded by: Kamran Tessori

Member of Senate of Pakistan
- In office 12 March 2015 – February 2018
- Constituency: Punjab

Personal details
- Born: 28 January 1960 (age 66) Karachi, Sindh, Pakistan
- Party: PML-N (1992-present)

Syed Nehal Hashmi (Urdu: سید نہال ہاشمی; born 28 January 1960) is a Pakistani lawyer and politician who is currently serving as the Governor of Sindh. He assumed office on 13 March 2026. He previously served as a member of the Senate of Pakistan from March 2015 to February 2018.

== Early life ==
Nehal Hashmi was born on 28 January 1960. He was a prominent student leader and founded his own political organisation by the name of All Pakistan Youth league, and served as its president before joining PML-N in 1992.

== Law career ==
Hashmi started practicing law in the late 1980s. He is also the Managing Partner of Nehal Hashmi Law Associates.

He has over 25 reported cases in the law journals of Pakistan and has also remained associated with some high-profile cases including providing his legal services in the Murtaza Bhutto's murder trial, former Prime Minister Nawaz Sharif's NAB case in 1999, and Russian Hi-jacker case.

== Political career ==
Hashmi was the adviser to the former prime-minister of Pakistan Muhammad Nawaz Sharif on Law Justice and Human Rights from 1997 to 1999.

He was serving as the President of Pakistan Muslim League (N) (PML-N) chapter in Karachi during 2012.

In August 2014, he was appointed as the General Secretary of PML-N chapter in Sindh. In October 2014, he was re-appointed as the General Secretary of PML-N Sindh.

He was elected to the Senate of Pakistan on general seat from Punjab as a candidate of PML-N in 2015 Pakistani Senate election.

He has served as the advisor to the Prime Minister of Pakistan on law, justice and human rights.

In May 2017, his membership in PML-N was suspended and he was asked to resign from the membership of Senate by Prime Minister Nawaz Sharif for violating the party discipline. After which he announced to resign from the Senate. In June 2017, he withdrew his resignation from Senate after a meeting with the chairman of the Senate.

On 1 February 2018, Hashmi was convicted by the Supreme Court of Pakistan in a contempt of court case. He was sentenced to one month imprisonment, and was barred from holding public office for a period of next five years.

On the same day, he ceased to be a member of the Senate and was arrested. He was released from Adiala Jail after a month on 28 February.

That PML-N restored the party membership of Nehal Hashmi in 2021 and since then he remained active on the forefronts of PML-N in Karachi and Sindh. That in view of his dedications, tireless efforts and loyalty towards PML-N, The Prime Minister of Pakistan Mian Shahbaz Sharif appointed Nehal Hashmi as the new Governor of Province of Sindh on 12-03-2026 and sent a summary of approval to the Honorable President of Pakistan for his approval of the Summary subsequently the President of Pakistan approved the Summary and Nehal Hashmi was appointed as Governor of Sindh.

PML-N leader Nehal Hashmi was sworn in as the new Governor of Sindh on 13 March 2026. The oath of office was administered by Sindh High Court Chief Justice Zafar Ahmed Rajput at a ceremony held at Governor House Karachi.

The swearing-in ceremony was attended by Sindh Chief Minister Murad Ali Shah, Sindh Home Minister Zia Lanjar, Karachi Mayor Murtaza Wahab, PML-N Sindh President Bashir Memon, as well as party leaders, workers, and other dignitaries.
