= Government of Sindh =

Provincial government of Sindh, Pakistan

Legislative branch
- Name: Sindh Assembly
- Presiding officer: Awais Qadir Shah, Speaker

Executive branch
- Head of state
- Title: Governor
- Currently: Nehal Hashmi

Judicial branch
- Sindh High Court
- Chief judge: Junaid Ghaffar

The Government of Sindh (Sindhi: حڪومت سنڌ) (Urdu: حکومتِ سندھ) is the provincial government of the province of Sindh, Pakistan. Its powers and structure are set out in the provisions of the 1973 Constitution, in which 30 Districts of 7 Divisions under its authority and jurisdiction.

The province's executive head and head of the government is the Chief Secretary Sindh. All officers and cabinet members report to the Chief Secretary. The Chief Secretary is an appointed official by the Prime Minister of Pakistan. The Chief Secretary of Sindh is usually a Grade 22 officer, belonging to the Pakistan Administrative Service.

Although the Governor is the head of the province on paper, it is largely a ceremonial position; and the main powers lie with the Chief Secretary of Sindh and Chief Minister of Sindh.

The province is governed by a unicameral legislature with the head of government known as the Chief Minister. The Chief Minister, invariably a leader of a political party represented in the Assembly, selects members of the provincial Cabinet.

The terms Government of Sindh or Sindh Government are often used in official documents. The seat of Government is in Karachi, thus serving as the capital of the province.

== Executive ==
The Chief Secretary Sindh, as head of the provincial bureaucracy, is the boss of the province. The provincial Chief Secretary of Grade-22 is equivalent in rank to a Federal Secretary, is appointed by the Prime Minister of Pakistan. Under him comes the entire Government of Sindh.

These are the officers currently serving as Secretaries in Sindh

Secretaries Serving in Sindh
No.	Name of Officer	Posting	Service
1.	Mr.Asif Hyder Shah	Chief Secretary Sindh	
2.	Mr. Najam Ahmed Shah	Chairman Planning & Development Board, Sindh	
3.	Syed Ahmed Ali Shah	Additional Charge Senior Member, Board of Revenue Sindh	
4.	Agha Shahnawaz Khan	Secretary, Environment, Climate Change & Costal Development Department	
6.	Dr.Shereen Mustufa	Chairperson, Chief Minister's Inspection, Enquiries & Implementation Team	
7.	Agha Wasif Abbass	Additional charge Principal Secretary to Chief Minister, Sindh	
8.	Mr. Muhammad Waseem	Chairman Sindh Public Service Commission	
9.	Mr. Sajid Jamal Abro	Principal Secretary to Governor Sindh	
11.	Muhammad Iqbal Memon	Additional Chief Secretary, Home Department	
12.	Mr.Muhammad Saleem Baloch	Secretary (Land Utilization )	
13.	MR. Muhammad Abbas Baloch	Secretary, Universities & Boards Department	
14.	Mr. Muhammad Bachal Rahupoto	Secretary, Food Department	
16.	Dr.Waseem Shamshad Ali	Secretary, Local Govt. & HTP Department	
17.	Mr. Fayaz Ahmed Jatoi	Secretary, Finance Department	
18.	Mr. Farhan Ghani Khan	Secretary, (I&C) SGA&CD Department	
19.	Mr.Muhammad Nawaz Sahoo	Secretary (GA), SGA & CD	
21.	Mr. Ghualm Ali Brahmani	Secretary, (Services) SGA&CD Department	
22.	Mr.Asif Ikram	Secretary, Inter Provincial Coordination Department	
23.	Mr. Akhtar Hussain Bugti	Secretary, Rehabilitation Department.	
24.	Mr. Abdul Waheed Shaikh	Additional Chief Secretary, (Training Management & Research Wing) SGA&CD Department	
26.	Khair Muhammad Kalwar	Secretary, Culture, Tourism & Antiquities Department	
27.	Dr.kazim Hussain Jatoi	Secretary, Livestock & Fisheries Department	
28.	Mr.Sajjad Hussain Abbasi	Secretary Planning & Development Department	
29.	Mr. Jawed Sibghatullah Mahar	Secretary, Auqaf, Religious Affairs, Zakat & Ushr Department	
31.	MR. NADEEM-UR-REHMAN MEMON	Secretary Information & Archives Department	
32.	Mr.Muhammad Ali Khoso	Secretary, Works & Services Department	
33.	Mr. Muhammad Saleem Rajput	Secretary, Excise, Taxation & Narcotics Department	
34.	Mr. Hafeezullah Abbasi	Secretary, Population Welfare Department	
36.	Raja Shahzman Khuhro	Secretary, Mines & Minerals Development Department	
37.	MR. ASSAD ZAMIN	Secretary, Transport & Mass Transit Department	
38.	Mr. Muhammad Rafique Qureshi	Secretary, Labour & Human Resources Department	
39.	Mr. Ali Ahmed Baloch	Secretary, Law, Parliamentary Affairs Department	
41.	Mr.Zanif Iqbal Khero	Secretary, Irrigation Department	
42.	Mr. Nazir Ahmed Qureshi	Secretary(Revenue), Board of Revenue Sindh	
43.	Mr.Suhail Ahmed Quershi	Secretary, Agriculture, Supply & Prices Department	
44.	Mr. Rehan Iqbal Baloch	Secretary, Health Department	
46.	Mr. Noor Ahmed Samoo	Secretary Science & Information Technology Department	
47.	RASHID AHMED ZARDARI	Secretary, Women Development Department	
48.	Mr. Muhammad Yaseen Sher Baloch	Secretary, Industries & Commerce Department	
49.	Mr.Jalaluddin Mahar	Secretary, Human settlement Department	
51.	Mr. Agha Suhail Ahmed	Secretary, Social Welfare Department	
52.	Mr. Musaddiq Ahmed Khan	Secretary, Energy Department	
53.	Mr. Aijaz Ali Shah	Secretary, Public Health Engineering & Rural Development Department	
54.	Mr. Ali Hussain Malik	Secretary, Provincial Ombudsman (Mohtasib)	
56.	Ghulam Qadir Talpur	M.D, Sindh Public Procurement Regulatory Authority	
57.	Mr. Shahab Qamar Ansari	Secretary, College Education Department	
58.	Ms. Anjum Iqbal Jumani	Secretary, Minorities Affairs Department	
59.	Mr. Makhdoom Shakeel-uz-Zaman	Member Registration, Stamps & Evacuee Property (RS&EP), Board of Revenue, Sindh	
61.	Vacant .	Member R&S, Board of Revenue	
62.	Mr. Moammar Salik Mirza (Ex-PCS)	Member Judicial-I, Board of Revenue	
63.	Mr. Rafique Ahmed Buriro	Member Judicial-II, Board of Revenue	
64.	Mr. Ejaz Hussain Baloch	Member Judicial-III, Board of Revenue	
66.	Dr. Badar Jamil Mendhro	Secretary, Forest, & Wildlife Department	
67.	Justice (Retd) Muhammad Sadiq Leghari	Chairman S.S Tribunal	
68.	Mr. G.M Umar Farooq	Secretary. Provincial Assembly Secretariat	
69.	Dr Ghulam Mustufa Suhaag	MD, Sindh Education & Vocational Training Authority (STEVTA)	
71.	Mr. Tariq Ali Shah	MD, Thar Coal & Energy board	
72.	Mr.Tuaha Ahmed Farooqui	Secretary, Department of Empowerment of Persons of Disabilities	
73.	Vacant .	Chairman, Employees Old-Age Benefits Association, Sindh	
74.	Mr. Shahid Taheem	Vice Chairman, Sindh Education & Vocational Training Authority (STEVTA)	
76.	Dr. Wasif Ali Memon	Chairman Sindh Revenue Board (SRB)	
77.	Mr.Muzamil Hussain	Secretary, Social Protection Department	
78.	Mr. Ghulam Nabi Memon	Inspector General of Sindh Police	
79.	Raja Khurram Shehzad Umar	Secretary, Investment Department	
81.	Mr. Muhammad Nawaz Soho	Secretary, Cooperative Department	
82.	Mr.Khalid Chachar	Secretary, Human Rights (HR) Department	

== Governance ==
At the Ministerial level, each department is headed by a Provincial Secretary. The Secretary is in-charge of all workings of their department, and in most cases are the Principal Accounting Officers of their department. Provincial Secretaries are usually Grade-20 Officers. There may also be Grade-21 Secretaries, in cases where the post has not been upgraded by the Chief Minister to that of an Additional Chief Secretary.

Apart from the Ministerial level, the Government of Sindh exercises its powers and function through Divisions and Districts. The Commissioners are in-charge of Divisions while Deputy Commissioners are in-charge of Districts. Commissioners report directly to the Chief Secretary are responsibly for everything in their Divisions. There are 6 Divisions, namely; Karachi, Hyderabad, Sukkur, Larkana, Mirpurkhas, and Shaheed Benazirbad. Commissioners are usually Officers of the rank of Grade-20 while the Commissioner Karachi Division is of the Grade-21 rank, as Karachi Division is the most important Division in all of Pakistan.

=== Top-Personnel ===
Top Executive Offices	Name's of Officials	Service/Party	Rank
Chief Minister	Murad Ali Shah	Pakistan Peoples Party	22
Chief Secretary	Asif Hyder Shah	PAS	BS-22
Chairman Planning and Development Board	Najam Ahmed Shah	PAS	BS-21
Chairman Enquiries & Anti-Corruption Establishment	Zulfiqar Ali Shah	PSS	BS-21
Minister of Universities and Board	Muhammad Ali Khan Malkani	Pakistan Peoples Party	
Commissioner Karachi Division	Muhammad Saleem Rajput	PAS	BS-21
Secretary Finance Department	Kazim Hussain Jatoi	PSS	BS-20

== Departments ==
=== Ministry level ===
Ministry level departments are usually headed by a Secretary who reports to the Chief Secretary and Chief Minister. The number of ministers in the cabinet is fixed, so a single minister can have multiple portfolios.

- Planning & Development Board
  - Planning & Development Department
- Services, General Administration, Coordination Department
  - Services Wing
  - General Administration Wing
  - Inter Provincial Coordination Wing
  - I&C Wing
  - Training Management & Research Management Wing
- Board of Revenue
- Enquiries & Anti-Corruption Establishment
- Local Government, Housing & Town Planning Department
- Home Department
- Chief Minister's Inspection, Enquiries & Implementation Team
- Universities and Boards Department
- Food Department
- Finance Department
- Health Department
- Culture, Tourism, Antiquities & Archives Department
- Livestock & Fisheries Department
- Auqaf, Religious Affairs, Zakat & Ushr Department
- Works & Services Department
- Information Department
- Clean & Road Department
- Provincial highways of Sindh
- Excise, Taxation & Narcotics Control
- Population Welfare Department
- Labour & Human Resources Department
- Law & Parliamentary Affairs Department
- Irrigation Department
- Agriculture, Supply & Prices Department
- Forest Department
- Sindh Wildlife Department
- Information, Science & Technology Department
- Cooperative Department
- Women Development Department
- Transport & Mass Transit Department
- Industries & Commerce Department
- Human Settlement Department
- Social Welfare Department
- Mines & Minerals Development Department
- Rehabilitation Department
- Energy Department
- Sports & Youth Affairs Department
- Public Health Engineering & Rural Development Department
- College Education Department
- School Education & Literacy Department
- Environment, Climate Change & Coastal Development Department
- Investment Department
- Minorities Affairs Department
- Human Rights Department

== VIP Aircraft ==
A Learjet 45 of Government Of Sindh in Dubai.

VIP aircraft operated by Government of Sindh:

Aircraft	Image	Quantity	Reg.
Learjet 45		2	AP-BHY
Learjet 45		2	N50145
Bell 412		2	AP-BEF
Bell 412		2	–
Boeing 737-33A		1	AP-BEH

== See also ==
- Pakistan Administrative Service
- Chief Secretary Sindh
- Chief Minister of Sindh
- Governor of Sindh
