= Abbasi (surname) =

Abbasi or Alabbasi is a surname derived from the personal name Abbas, implying descent or association with someone called Abbas. The name is especially popular in Pakistan and Iran. In particular, it may be used by families claiming descent from Abbas ibn Abd al-Muttalib (the uncle of the Islamic prophet Muhammad) or from similar ancestral sources. Notable people with this surname include:

- Ali Abbasi (director) (born 1981), Iranian-Danish film director
- Ali Abbasi (television host) (1961–2004), Pakistani-born Scottish television presenter
- Amanullah Abbasi, Pakistani judge
- Anoushay Abbasi, Pakistani actress
- Ansar Abbasi, Pakistani journalist
- Aram Abbasi, Iranian football player
- Armita Abbasi, Iranian protester, assaulted and detained as a prisoner
- Asadollah Abbasi, Iranian politician
- Ashraf Abbasi, Pakistani politician
- Davoud Seyed-Abbasi, Iranian football player
- Fereydoon Abbasi (1958–2025), Iranian nuclear scientist and politician
- Forough Abbasi, Iranian alpine skier
- Hamza Ali Abbasi, Pakistani actor and the religious student of Islamic scholar Javed Ahmad Ghamidi
- Heydar Abbasi, Iranian poet
- Imtiaz Abbasi, UAE cricketer
- Javeria Abbasi, Pakistani film–television actress
- Kashif Abbasi, Pakistani journalist
- Kazi Jalil Abbasi, Indian politician
- Mohammad Abbas Abbasi, Pakistani politician
- Mohammad Abbasi, Iranian politician
- Mohammadreza Abbasi, Iranian football player
- Muhammad Hanif Abbasi, Pakistani politician and businessman
- Muhammad Javed Abbasi, Pakistani politician
- Muhammad Nawaz Abbasi, Pakistani judge
- Murtaza Javed Abbasi, Pakistani politician
- Mustafa Zaman Abbasi, Bangladeshi musicologist
- Mustafa Abbasi, historian
- Muztar Abbasi, Pakistani Muslim scholar
- Nadeem Abbasi, Pakistani cricketer
- Nawab Salahuddin Abbasi, Pakistani politician
- Rajab Ali Khan Abbasi, Pakistani politician
- Sardar Mehtab Abbasi, Pakistani politician
- Shahid Khaqan Abbasi, Pakistani politician, businessman, and former prime minister of Pakistan (2017–18)
- Shakeel Abbasi, Pakistani field hockey player
- Shaykh 'Abbasi, Persian painter
- Soulmaz Abbasi, Iranian rower
- Tanveer Abbasi, Pakistani poet
- Vahid Seyed-Abbasi, Iranian volleyball player
- Zafar Mahmood Abbasi, Pakistani navy officer
- Zeeshan Abbasi, Pakistani cricketer
