= 2026 Gul Plaza Shopping Mall fire =

Fire in Karachi, Pakistan

2026 Gul Plaza shopping mall fire
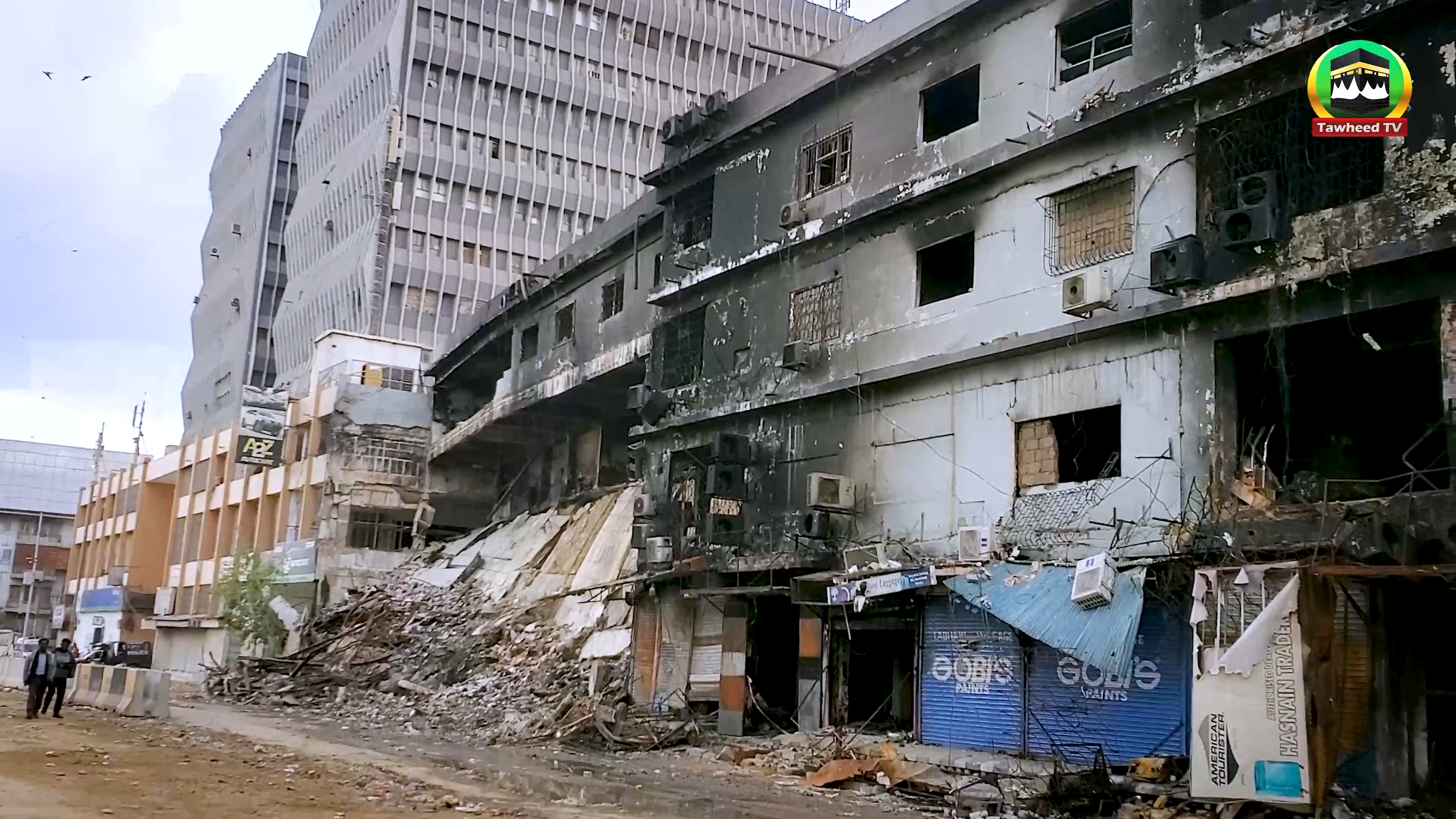
- Back side of Gul Plaza after the fire
- Date: 17–21 January 2026
- Time: ~21:50 (PKT)
- Duration: 36 hours
- Location: Gul Plaza, MA Jinnah Road, Karachi, Sindh, Pakistan; 24.8651°N 67.0241°E
- Type: Third-degree blaze
- Cause: Children playing with lighters or matches in artificial flower shop
- Deaths: 80
- Injuries: 20+
- Missing: 49
- Property damage: 2 billion

On 17 January 2026, a fire at the Gul Plaza shopping mall in Karachi, Pakistan, killed 80 people and injured over 20. The fire started after an unattended child accidentally set some artificial flowers alight with a matchstick in a shop on the ground floor. The fire spread rapidly through an air-conditioning duct to the rest of the building. The shopping mall lacked fire extinguishers or emergency exit lights, and many of the exits were locked.

A city-wide emergency was declared shortly after the fire broke out. Firefighters lacked the rescue equipment needed to conduct a rescue operation, such as gas masks or lock cutters, and responded slowly. Some victims were severely burned by firefighting water heated to scalding temperatures by the flames.

At the request of the Sindh government, the Sindh High Court appointed Justice Agha Faisal to lead a single-member inquiry into the fire.

== Background ==
Gul Plaza was a multi-storey shopping complex located on Muhammad Ali Jinnah Road in Karachi's Saddar area, which housed approximately 1,200 shops selling garments, electronics, cosmetics and household goods spread across three storeys, a mezzanine, and the basement. The complex was situated on an area of over 6,500 m^{2} (70,000 sq ft). The main corridors were 6–8 feet (1.8–2.4 m) wide, and the mezzanine corridors were about 10 feet (3.0 m).

According to the Sindh Building Control Authority (SBCA), the building was originally constructed in 1979, had a revised plan approved in 1998, and was "duly regularised" under the 2001 Regularisation Amendment Ordinance in 2003. In 2005, a revised No Objection Certificate for sale and advertisement was issued, approved for 1,102 shops spread across the basement, ground, first, second, and third floors.

According to The Express Tribune, Gul Plaza had four gas connections: two commercial, one industrial, and one domestic. The industrial connection, used to operate chillers, was suspended in November 2025. The building was also given a licence to operate a gas generator by the Sindh Energy Department. At the time of fire, gas load-shedding was in effect, possibly lessening the impact of the gas on the fire.

The last fire inspections of the building were conducted by the Directorate General of Civil Defence in 2024 and 2025. A technical instructor working for Civil Defence testified that deficiencies were found in the building's fire safety measures, but a challan could not be filed with a special court, as the court was unavailable. Though the court become available in July 2025, no challan was filed.

Thirteen of Gul Plaza's 16 exits were locked, as it was near closing time. Most shopkeepers had either already left or were closing up their shops. The windows were either blocked with inventory or sealed off. There were no emergency exits, smoke alarms, fire hoses, fire extinguishers, fire sprinkler systems, or emergency lights in the building. Each passage only had one 12-volt emergency light, which proved insufficient for proper evacuation of the building, in lieu of proper emergency exit lights. A Sub-Fire Officer commented, "If they had a fire extinguisher in the first shop where the fire initially erupted, they could have put it out there and then."

== Fire ==
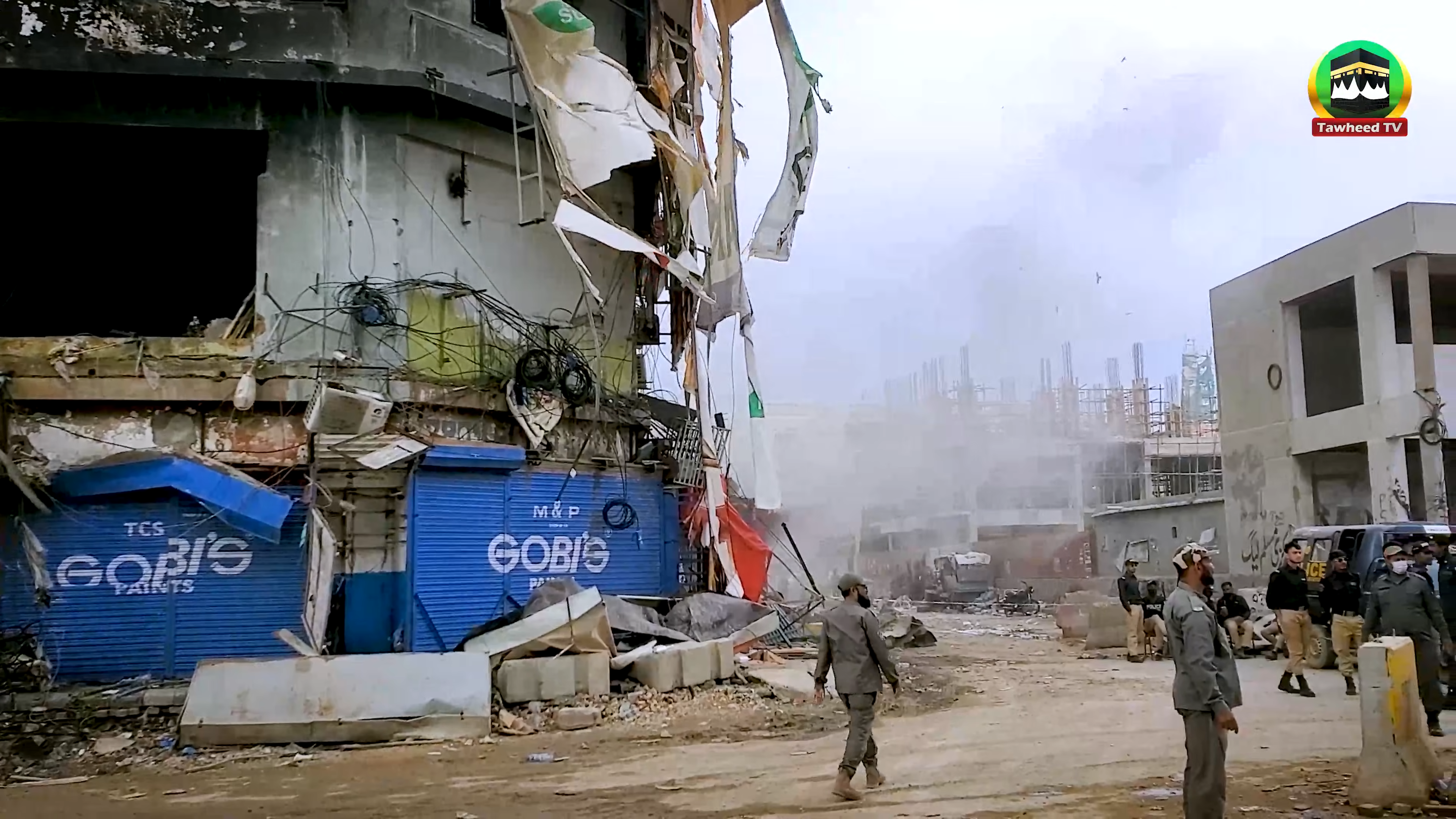
Authorities at the site after the fire

The fire started at around 22:15 Pakistan Standard Time (UTC+05:00) on the ground floor of the building and quickly spread to the upper levels due to the presence of flammable materials and limited ventilation. The fire started in a shop selling artificial flowers and pots. The shop owner had left earlier in the evening, and his 11-year-old son was left in the premises. While interacting with a 13-year-old boy, his son lit a matchstick, which accidentally fell onto some artificial flowers, setting them alight. The fire spread rapidly through an air-conditioning duct to the rest of the building.

According to a Gul Plaza shopkeeper, "The building had caught fire about ten times before, so we initially thought this was normal." A grille installed over the rooftop exit obstructed an escape route. A survivor testified, "It is further added that until the time of my falling conscious, there was no announcement of the fire made, nor did any person come to rescue the trapped people inside the building, either from the management side or from any government agency."

The first call to emergency services was placed at 22:26, and two fire vehicles were dispatched to the location. They classified it as a Grade 3 fire – "the highest category for an urban area", according to a provincial spokesman – and a city-wide emergency was declared by 22:45. According to Dawn, the authorities responded slowly and with only "limited resources" to extinguish the fire. As a result, the fire had burned "uncontrolled for hours", ranging from 800–1,200 °C (1,470–2,190 °F). Responders cut through windows and destroyed walls using hammers to get inside. Power to the building was cut by K-Electric after the fire broke out.

Ambulances of the Edhi Foundation and the Chhipa Welfare Association responded to the fire. Two ambulance drivers had managed to drive their vehicles to the upper floors of the building and rescued people using a ramp, after removing a locked iron grate. One fell from the third floor while rescuing victims.

Firefighters from the Karachi Metropolitan Corporation (KMC) and Rescue 1122 battled the fire for several hours. Multiple sections of the building collapsed during firefighting operations. The Pakistan Navy dispatched a fire brigade. After nearly 36 hours of continuous efforts, the fire was finally brought under control on 19 January.

=== Casualties ===
At least 80 people were confirmed dead, including a firefighter, 36-year-old Furqan Ali, who was killed in a structural collapse that also injured another firefighter. He was based in Nazimabad Fire Station and started working for the KMC Fire Department in 2018. More than 20 people were injured, while 49 were reported missing during rescue operations. According to a rescuer, the boiling water used to douse the fire caused severe burns to several victims. (Note: Firefighters did not use boiling water to douse the flames, the water became superheated from the fire.)

In several cases, only body parts were recovered, while DNA testing had to be conducted to identify some victims. On 21 January, 30 bodies were retrieved from a crockery shop on the mezzanine floor. The victims were suffocated after locking themselves in the shop awaiting rescue. According to Dawn, the shop had announced a sale for the wedding season, leading to a large number of people in the shop. Furthermore, the shop had decided to close at 02:00 instead of the usual 22:00 due to the sale.

The primary cause of death of most of the victims was established as suffocation, though many showed signs of polytrauma. Per the president of Gul Plaza's management committee, 72 out of the 80 victims had died on the upper floors, and 51 of those 72 were shopkeepers or employees.

== Response and investigation ==
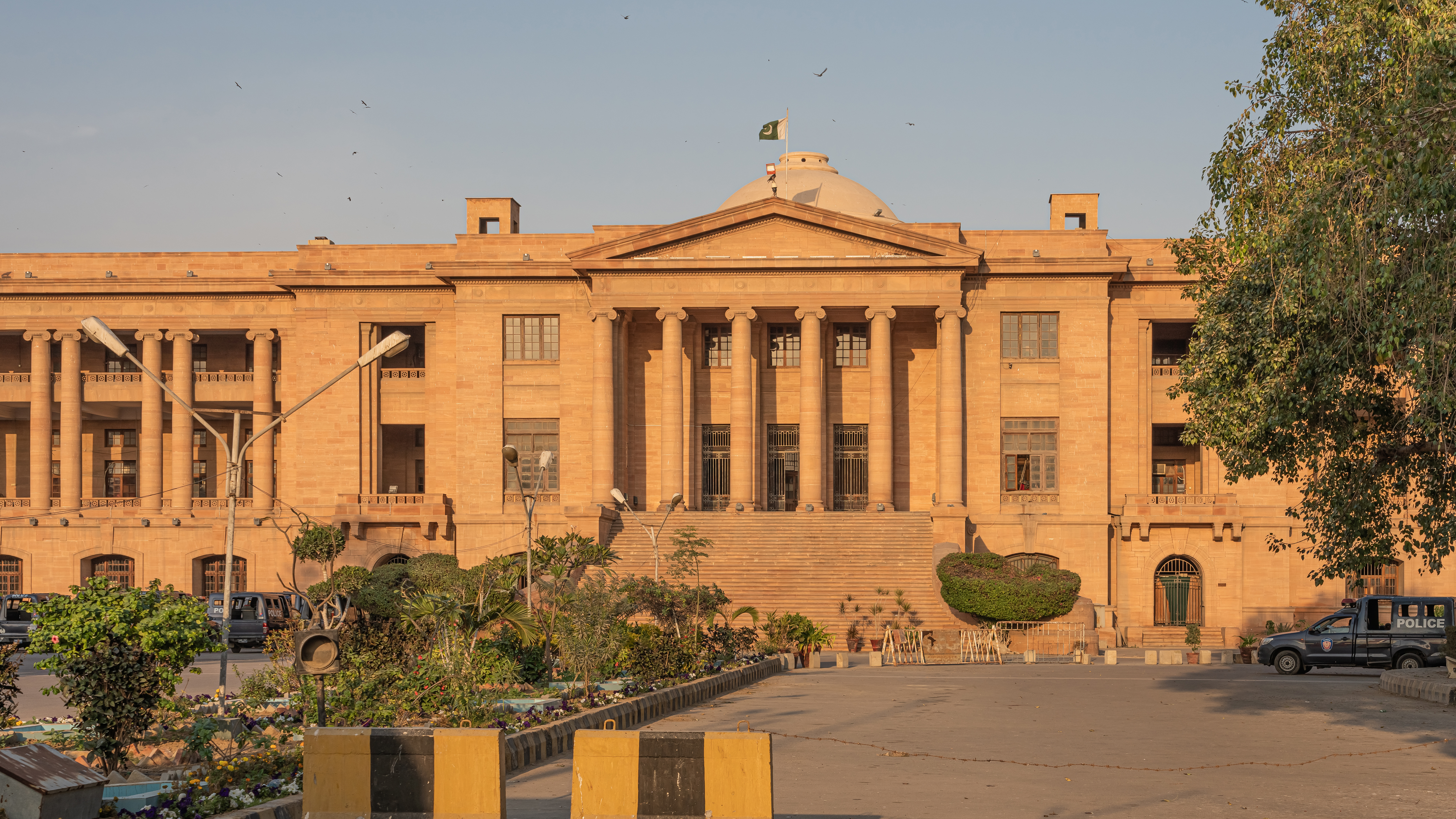
The Sindh High Court (building pictured in 2020) announced an inquiry into the fire, to be headed by High Court Justice Agha Faisal.

The Sindh government called the fire a "national tragedy". It announced compensation of 10 million rupees (US$35,000) for the families of the deceased, ordered an inquiry into the incident and established a helpline for families of missing persons. Hospitals across the city were placed on emergency alert.

In mid-February, Karachi mayor Murtaza Wahab announced that the city had set up temporary shops for 300 traders that had lost their shops in the fire. A week later, 350 of them were given temporary stalls in the baradari of the Polo Ground, Karachi. Wahab also announced that the process of distributing the total compensation of 7 billion rupees to the traders had begun, and financial assistance of up to 500,000 rupees monthly was already being provided.

The police registered a first information report on 24 January, in which they called the fire an "outcome of negligence and carelessness". On 4 February, after a request from the Sindh government, the Sindh High Court announced that a single-member committee, consisting of Sindh High Court justice Agha Faisal, would complete an inquiry within eight weeks. He was nominated by Chief Justice Zafar Ahmed Rajput. The probe concluded on 7 April.

Before the commission, an electric inspector testified that inspections of electrical load and infrastructure, including the integrity and functionality of fire-fighting equipment, had not been conducted for 20 years. The inspections had been stopped on the orders of the Sindh Energy Department. During the fire, out of the 41 types of equipment needed by the fire brigade and urban search and rescue, only 29 were available. The fire brigade did not have access to lock cutters, gas masks, snorkels, aerial ladders, or excavators. An ambulance driver that responded to the fire testified that the rescue workers and firefighters lacked a defined command hierarchy, and did not know how to conduct a rescue operations or control the fire.

A technical inspector of the Directorate General of Civil Defence, before the committee, criticised the decision by K-Electric to cut electricity to the building immediately after the fire broke out. According to him, as the fire did not originate from a short circuit, it was not necessary to cut electricity immediately, and the decision to do so exacerbated panic amongst people trapped in the building. The Director General of Rescue 1122 said, "Power shutdown caused maximum loss".

An 11-year-old boy has been charged to be tried in juvenile court. Police alleged the boy was playing with match sticks side his father's flower shop when the fire started. Police has also charged the boy's father and four members of the Gul Plaza Management Committee. A police chargesheet was formally filed on 3 September.

== Aftermath ==
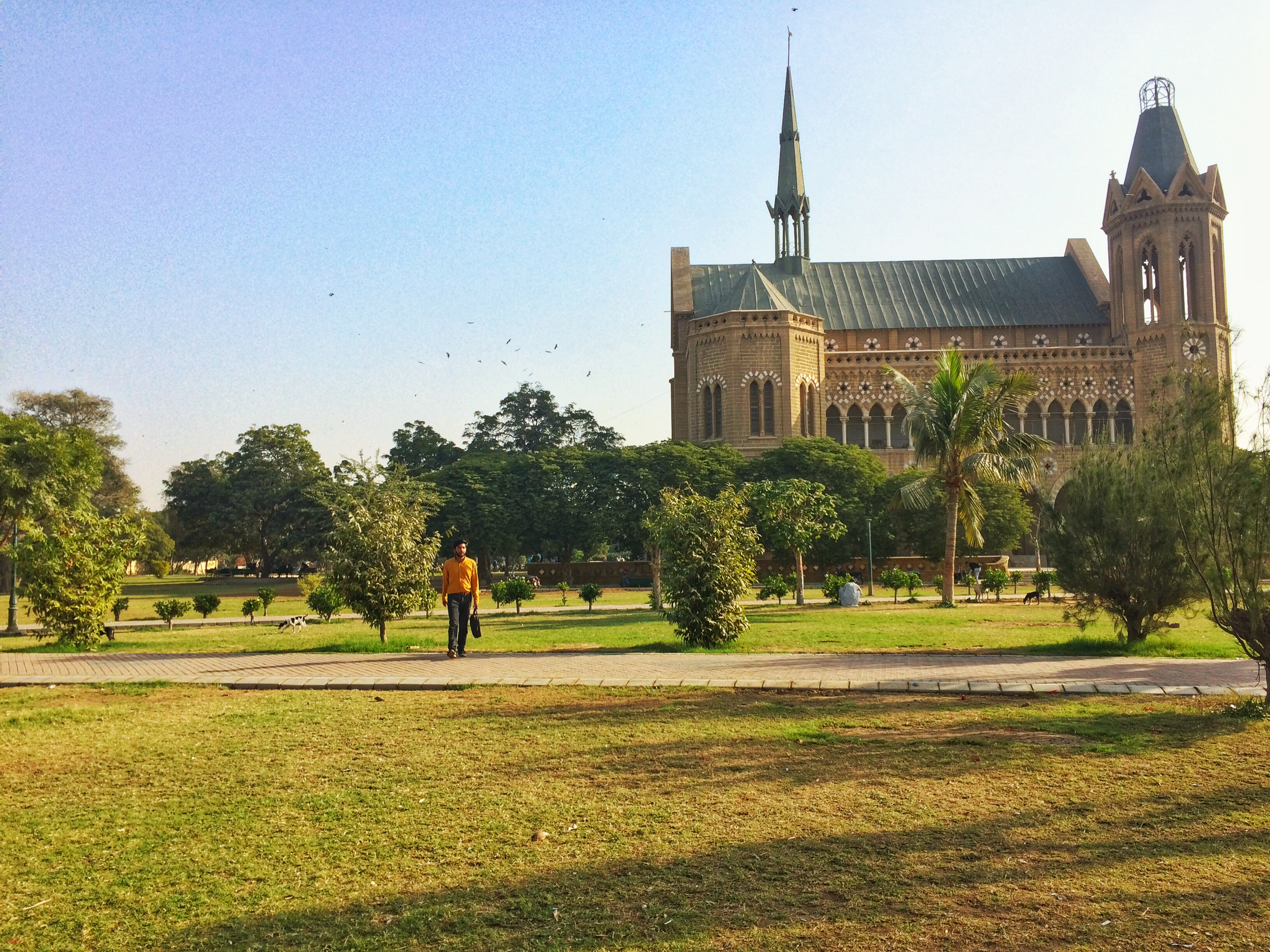
Traders who lost their shops in the fire set up makeshift shops at the Bagh-e-Jinnah park in Karachi (pictured in 2019).

The complex was heavily damaged and partially collapsed. The neighbouring Rimpa Plaza was declared unsafe by the SBCA after it was damaged by debris from Gul Plaza.

The fire caused extensive economic losses to shop owners and renewed debate over fire safety compliance in Karachi's commercial buildings. According to the Press Trust of India, a senior official of the Gul Plaza's shop owners association estimated economic losses of at least 3 billion rupees. According to Arab News, the losses were exacerbated by the upcoming Ramadan and wedding seasons – which is typically the apex of sales for traders in Gul Plaza – so they had much more merchandise in stock than usual. Some traders who lost their shops in the fire set up makeshift shops in the Bagh-e-Jinnah park.

The search for people was hampered by the risk of further collapse of the buildings. On 22 January, people gathered outside the plaza and staged a protest, criticising the slow pace of the search operation. AI-generated images claiming to depict the fire spread on social media.

The search operation concluded on 27 January and the building was sealed. Sindh chief minister Murad Ali Shah stated that shops will be built on the site within two years, and the rest of the building will be demolished. On 2 April, Shah ordered the building demolished and requested a plan to reconstruct the building from the SBCA.

On 22 March 2026, another fire erupted in the basement of Gul Plaza at about 16:53, fuelled by the remains of merchandise. According to Karachi police, the fire was set by drug addicts whilst they were stealing copper wire from the basement. The fire killed an unidentified man, who was estimated to be around 45 years old. He was found, severely burned, in the basement, and died in hospital. Eight police officers were suspended, accused of negligence. After the first fire, the building had been enveloped by a green cloth, but the cloth was damaged by rains, allowing entrance into the building. The next day, another fire occurred in the basement of the now-sealed building. The police arrested a person, who they suspected to be addicted to drugs, on suspicion of starting the fire.

== See also ==
- 2012 Pakistan factory fires
- List of industrial disasters
