= Mushir Alam (jurist) =

Pakistani jurist

Justice of the Supreme Court of Pakistan
- In office 20 September 2013 – August 2021

Chief Justice of the Sindh High Court
- In office 14 February 2011 – 19 September 2013
- Preceded by: Sarmad Jalal Osmany
- Succeeded by: Maqbool Baqar

Personal details
- Born: August 18, 1956 (age 70)
- Profession: Jurist

Mushir Alam (born 18 August 1956) is a Pakistani jurist who served as chief justice of the Sindh High Court and later as a judge of the Supreme Court of Pakistan. He was appointed to the Sindh High Court in April 1999, became chief justice of that court in 2011, and was elevated to the Supreme Court in 2013.

== Early life and legal career ==
Alam was born into a family associated with the legal profession on 18 August 1956. He received his LL.B. from S. M. Law College, Karachi, joined the Karachi Bar in 1981, and was enrolled as an advocate of the high court in 1983.

== Career ==
Alam later served as honorary joint secretary and then general secretary of the High Court Bar Association, Karachi, and was elected a member of the Sindh Bar Council. In 1998, he was appointed standing counsel for the Government of Pakistan. He also worked with the All Pakistan Trade Union Congress and attended regional and international conferences and workshops under labour organisations including the Brotherhood of Asian Trade Union, the Worker Confederation of Labour, and the International Labour Organization.

Alam was elevated to the bench of the Sindh High Court on 20 April 1999. During the 2007 emergency, he was among the Sindh High Court judges who refused to take oath under the Provisional Constitutional Order. On 14 February 2011, he was sworn in as chief justice of the Sindh High Court. He remained in that office until 19 September 2013.

On 20 September 2013, Alam was elevated to the Supreme Court of Pakistan and took oath at the Karachi registry of the court. He retired from the Supreme Court in August 2021 after more than 22 years on Pakistan's superior courts.

In July 2024, Alam declined an offer to return to the Supreme Court as an ad hoc judge, saying that he intended to continue welfare work through a disability management centre and the Vision Health Care Foundation.
