= Tufail Ali Abdul Rehman =

Pakistani politician

Tufail Ali Abdul Rahman was a Pakistani jurist who served as Chief Justice of the Sindh High Court. Born in Karachi, Sindh in 1921, he hailed from a family that produced a several legal professionals, government officials and people involved in the education sector.

== Family background and education ==
Tufail Ali Abdul Rahman's father Barrister Abdul Rahman? was a prominent member of the legal fraternity of South Asia, affiliated with the prestigious Queens Council. Tufail Rehman was married to his cousin Dr. Sarah Afroze Zubedi who after graduating in medicine acquired four post-graduate degrees in various languages and was actively involved in social work. He studied law at the Aligarh University, and he along with his elder brother Barrister Hassanally A. Rahman were the founding architects of the Sindh Muslim Law College, Karachi. His elder brother was also Vice Chancellor of the University of Sindh on two occasions. Subsequently Tufail Rahman Zubedi joined the faculty of the law college he founded in the University of Sindh Jamshoro. Mr. Tufail Ali Abdul Rahman Zubedi was succeeded by many eminent family members, all of whom in their own right have earned respect both in Sindh, Pakistan, and the world-at-large in the areas of civil services, judiciary and education.

== Eminent career as a legal luminary ==
Tufail Rahman Zubedi soon reached the heights of the legal profession in Pakistan and was appointed to the high office of Attorney General of Pakistan by President Ayub Khan. Subsequently he was directly elevated to the position of Chief Justice of the High Court of Sindh and Balochistan in 1970. This made him one of the three judges in the entire history of Pakistan to be directly appointed chief justice of any high court; the second being Justice Manzur Qadir who also served as Foreign Minister of Pakistan.and Third was Justice Faiz Esa of Balochistan High court who was made Chief Justice of Balochistan High Court when all the judges of said high court were disqualified through a decision of Supreme court headed by Justice Iftikhar Mohammad Chaudhry. He worked very strenuously in this high office. During this period he also served as acting Governor of Sindh. Justice Tufail Ali Abdul Rahman Zubedi was appointed on the commission to inquire into the dismemberment of East Pakistan in 1971, popularly known as the Hamoodur Rahman Commission. Throughout his life, Justice Tufail Rahman Zubedi strived to maintain the independence of the judiciary.

== Death ==
Justice Tufail Ali Abdul Rahman Zubedi died on 16 January 1975 while holding the office of the Chief Justice High Court of Sindh at the relatively young age of 54 on account of a long history of rheumatic heart disease. Many emotional scenes were witnessed during the Full Court Reference held in his honour. His prolific contributions towards preserving the independence of the judiciary were recognized posthumously through an award bestowed during March 2006 by the Supreme Court of Pakistan for his devotion, hard work and invaluable service in the realm of law and dispensation of justice. His accomplishments have also been proudly mentioned by many in other communities.

Government offices
Preceded by new office previously West Pakistan High Court	Chief Justice High Court of Sindh; 1970-1975	Succeeded by Justice Abdul Kadir Shaikh

== See also ==
- Sindh Muslim Law College
- Hassanally A. Rahman Zubedi
