= Abdul Hafeez Memon =

Abdul Hafeez Memon was a Pakistani jurist who served as a chief justice of the Sindh High Court.

== Career ==
Memon was appointed as a judge of the Sindh-Balochistan High Court in 1973. He was not asked to take a new oath under the provisional constitution order in 1981. In 1988, he chaired a commission to review cases of public servants dismissed during General Zia's martial law.

In 1994, Memon was appointed as a judge of the Supreme Court of Pakistan and served as Acting Chief Justice of the Sindh High Court. He ceased to be Chief Justice following the 1996 Judges Case and retired from the Supreme Court in 1997.

Memon was elected president of the United Memon Jamaat in 1981 and became a member of the World Memon Organization board of management in 2002.
