= Aqeel Ahmed Abbasi =

Pakistani judge (born 1963)

Justice of the Supreme Court of Pakistan
- Incumbent
- Assumed office 25 June 2024

Chief Justice of the Sindh High Court
- In office 3 November 2023 – 24 June 2024
- Preceded by: Irfan Saadat Khan (acting)
- Succeeded by: Muhammad Shafi Siddiqui (acting)

Senior Justice of the Sindh High Court
- In office 2 October 2023 – 24 June 2024
- Preceded by: Irfan Saadat Khan

Justice of the Sindh High Court
- In office 25 September 2009 – 24 June 2024

Personal details
- Born: 16 June 1963 (age 63) Karachi, Pakistan

Aqeel Ahmed Abbasi (born 16 June 1963) is a Pakistani jurist who has been serving as a judge of the Supreme Court of Pakistan (SCP) since June 2024. He previously also served as the Chief Justice of Sindh High Court (SHC) from November 2023 to June 2024. He was appointed a judge of the SHC on 25 September 2009.
