= Armita =

Armita is a female Persian given name.

Armita is derived from the Avestan name Ārmaiti, which refers to "holy devotion" or "divine creativity." The name has found popularity among Persian-speaking communities and within Zoroastrianism. The name has increased in usage in recent years along with other Zoroastrian inspired names.

Ārmaiti, also known as Spəntā Ārmaiti, Spandārmad in Pahlavi, and Isfandārmad in Persian, is one of the six great Aməša Spəntas who, along with Ahura Mazdā, form the Zoroastrian Heptad. Her name means "piety" or "devotion," and in Zoroaster's Gāθās, she is often described with the adjective spənta, meaning "bounteous" or "holy." Ārmaiti is essential for righteousness, guiding humans towards a good life and salvation. Zoroaster metaphorically described her as the "daughter" of Ahura Mazdā, highlighting her close relationship with the supreme deity. Ārmaiti is associated with the earth, which she protects and nurtures. In Zoroastrian rituals, Ārmaiti is symbolically represented by the earth of the consecrated precinct, emphasizing her nurturing aspect. Texts such as the Bundahišn describe her as providing complete mindfulness of Ahura Mazdā to his creatures and protecting the souls of the just. Ārmaiti's role extends to safeguarding women, paralleling the earth's nurturing of life. Her name is celebrated in the Zoroastrian calendar, with the fifth day of the first month and the twelfth month dedicated to her. Her festival, known as ǰašn-e barzīgarān, is a time for both agricultural and women's celebrations, reflecting her dual role as the protector of the earth and women. This festival, which includes customs like visiting daḵmas to pray for the deceased, has been an important community event, especially among Zoroastrians in Iran, lasting well into the twentieth century.

Notable people with the name include:

- Armita Abbasi
- Armita Geravand
