= Elham Modaressi =

Iranian artist & activist (born 1990)

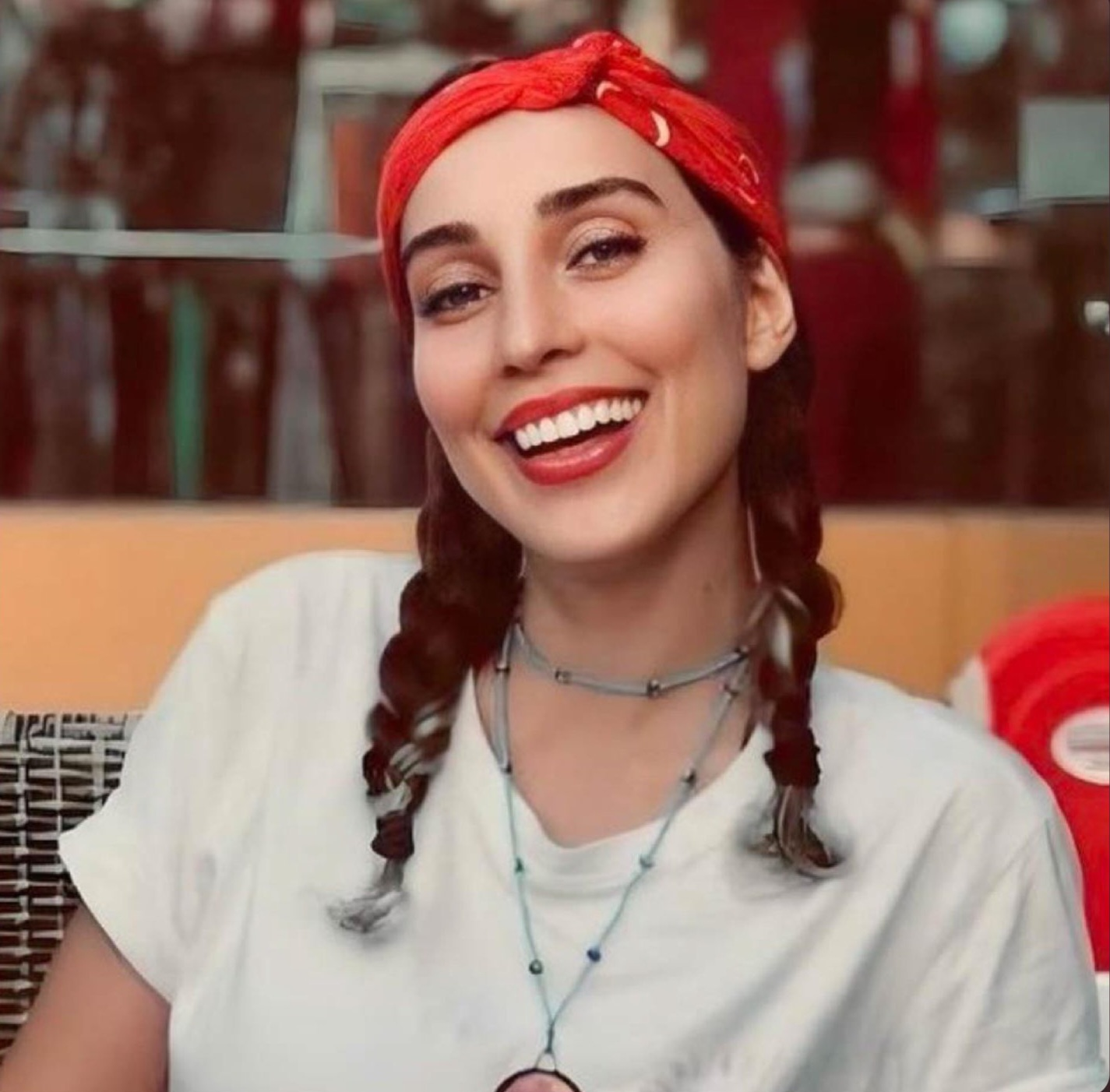
Elham Modaressi

Elham Modaressi (Persian: الهام مدرسی; born December 28, 1990) is an Iranian artist and activist who was arrested in 2022 for her active involvement in the Woman, Life, Freedom movement. She is one of the detainees of the Mahsa Amini protests.

Brutally arrested for participating in protest, she was imprisoned at Kachooie Prison in Karaj, and was repeatedly tortured. To protest the abysmal conditions of the prison, she went on a hunger strike with 14 other women. She was released in 2023 on bail.

== Early life ==
Elham was born on December 28, 1990, in Sanandaj, Kurdistan province, Iran, as the youngest out of seven children. At the time of her arrest, she was living in Karaj with her mother and brother.

== Arrest ==
Elham protested during the Mahsa Amini protests, which followed after the death of Mahsa Amini. On the night of November 2, 2022, agents of the Islamic regime entered into the house she shared with her mother and brother, and attacked the family. She was taken to the intelligence detention center and later was transferred to Kachooie Prison.

=== Charges ===
Charges against Elham included: "propaganda against the regime", "damaging facilities", "disrupting public order and comfort" and "inciting people to kill". It has been shown that the death sentence is arbitrarily given for some of those charges. Human rights organizations have said that the government used the death penalty to subdue the protesters. The interrogators tried to force her into a false confession. Elham has stated that interrogators were trying to force her into saying that she was a member of the Komala party and that she had weapons. She has stated that did not have any weapons and that she was a peaceful protester. She was not allowed to have a lawyer.

== Torture ==
Elham was tortured severely in prison. Amnesty International determined that many detained Iranians suffered many forms of torture, even sexual violence. Elham was taken from the prison to the intelligence detentions center daily for interrogation. She was physically and mentally tortured. She stated that interrogators told her her mother had died. They, also, claimed her brother was being tortured in the cell next to hers. Another way they tortured her was by denying her medical care. Human rights groups had already documented that the Islamic Republic of Iran routinely withheld medical care to their prisoners. Elham was also injected with unknown substances.

== Hunger strike ==
On January 1, 2023, Elham along with 14 other inmates including Armita Abbasi and Hamideh Zeraei began a hunger strike to protest against the horrible conditions in the prison. Elham was beaten by security guards for going on a hunger strike. As the hunger strike went on, Elham's condition deteriorated.

== World recognition ==
During Elham's imprisonment, her sisters began to speak out about Elham's situation in an effort to pressure the government and gather support to free her. Her sister's Nahid, Zhila, and Rose gave numerous interviews with the media. They attended demonstrations to bring awareness. They started a petition on Change.org to free her. Many activists began to campaign for her release even Reza Pahlavi, the last Crown Prince of Iran, called for her release. Celebrities, led by the Iranian diaspora advocated for Elham and other detainees. She was featured in a photo essay in Elle France that included Golshifteh Farahani. Her photograph was held by French rabbi Delphine Horvilleur. Several politicians who were members of their country's parliament became political sponsors for Elham, including: the United Kingdom's Caroline Lucas, Germany's Kerstin Vieregge, France's Nathalie Goulet, and Canada's Emmanuela Lambropoulos. The Mayor of Ronnenberg, Marlo Kratzke also became a political sponsor.

== Release from prison ==
On January 22, 2023, Elham was released on bail from prison. Her sisters announced her release on their social media. Soon, Elham herself started an Instagram page and published a video announcing her release from prison. After she was released from prison, medical tests showed that during her time in prison she had developed liver cirrhosis. She and her family faced harassment from security forces. She had difficulties getting medication.

== Fleeing to Turkey ==
On August 1, 2023, Elham left Iran for Turkey where her sister Nahid had been living as a refugee for several years. She left because she and her family were under constant pressure from agents of the Islamic regime and she was prevented from getting treatment. Elham gave interviews with news media about what she had experienced. She was interviewed by BBC Persian and she was a guest on Masih Alinejad's show Tablet. She published her own statement about her experiences on her social media.

In August 2023, Elham was in acute liver failure and doctors in Turkey told her that she needed a liver transplant as soon as possible. Friends realized that because Elham was a refugee in Turkey, she was not eligible for medical insurance and would have to pay all medical costs herself. A gofundme campaign was launched. Thousands of people from all over the world donate to the fund and enough money was raised to pay for her medical bills. By November, enough money had been raised that Nahid began searching for a hospital in Turkey that would do a live donor liver transplant. Several people volunteered to be a live liver donor for Elham. Many of the tested donors were not a match. The law in Turkey for live liver donation is very strict. On December 28, 2023, they found out that a donor who matched was not approved by the ethics committee. After that, Nahid campaigned on social media for the ethics committee to approve the next donor.

Elham was in agonizing pain. She increasingly became very weak. Her sister and friends who witnessed it posted about it in social media. She required frequent hospitalizations and home treatments by home healthcare nurses. The situation was exacerbated because the process to find a suitable donor who would be approved took several months. All of this was chronicled in the Instagram page of Elham's sister Nahid who was taking care of her.

Finally, in February 2024, a donor was approved by a Turkish medical ethics committee and the family was informed that the transplant could take place soon. Elham received a living-donor liver transplant on February 22, 2024 in a hospital in Turkey. It was successful and she recuperated there under care of her surgeons. A living-donor liver transplant, is when a living person gives a piece of their liver to an individual with a diseased liver. The donor wished to remain anonymous.

== Canada ==
During the time it took for a suitable donor to be found and approved, activists in Canada ran campaigned to get Elham treatment in Canada. However, because of the severity of her disease, she became too ill to travel and had to have the operation in Turkey. The Iranian Justice Collective was instrumental in helping to get Elham a visa to Canada. Elham arrived with her mother in Canada on May 8, 2024.
