= Muhammad Shafi Siddiqui =

Justice of the Supreme Court of Pakistan
- Incumbent
- Assumed office 14 February 2025

Chief Justice of the Sindh High Court
- In office 13 July 2024 – 14 February 2025
- Preceded by: Irfan Saadat Khan
- Succeeded by: Muhammad Junaid Ghaffar (Acting)

Justice of the Sindh High Court
- In office 20 March 2012 – 14 February 2025

Personal details
- Born: 12 August 1965 (age 61)

Muhammad Shafi Siddiqui (born 12 August 1965) is a Pakistani jurist who has been serving as a Justice of the Supreme Court of Pakistan since 14 February 2025. He has previously served as a Justice of the Sindh High Court and Chief Justice of that court since 20 March 2012 and 25 June 2024 respectively till 13 February 2025.

== Early life and education ==
Muhammad Shafi Siddiqui was born on 12 August 1965 in Sindh, Pakistan. He received the following education:

- Matriculation - Jufelhurst School, Karachi.
- Intermediate and Bachelor Graduate - D.J. Science College, Karachi.
- Bachelor of Laws - S.M. Law College, Karachi.

== Law career ==
He enrolled as an Advocate of Subordinate Courts in 1992, and became an Advocate of High Courts in 1994. He further enrolled as an Advocate of Supreme Court of Pakistan in 2008.

=== Sindh High Court ===
He was elevated as a Justice of the Sindh High Court on 20 March 2012. He oversaw dispute and constitutional cases as a justice. Justice Siddiqui was expected incoming acting Chief Justice of Sindh High Court. He was elevated as Chief Justice on 13 July 2024.

=== Supreme Court of Pakistan ===
He was elevated as a Justice of the Supreme Court of Pakistan on 14 February 2025
