= Adnan Iqbal Chaudhry =

Justice of the Sindh High Court

Justice of the Sindh High Court
- Incumbent
- Assumed office 6 February 2018

Personal details
- Born: 15 December 1971 (age 54)

Adnan Iqbal Chaudhry (born 15 December 1971) is a Pakistani jurist who has served as a judge of the Sindh High Court since 6 February 2018.

== Early life and education ==
Chaudhry was born on 15 December 1971. He completed his LL.B. in 1997 from Sindh Muslim Law College and simultaneously pursued studies in business administration at Adamson University's Karachi campus.

== Career ==
Chaudhry was admitted to the Sindh Bar Council as an advocate in 1998. He was admitted as an advocate of the Sindh High Court the same year, and as an advocate of the Supreme Court of Pakistan in 2012. Prior to his judicial career, he was a partner at a law firm in Karachi. He was appointed as a judge of the Sindh High Court on February 6, 2018.
