= St. Anthony High School, Lahore =

St. Anthony's High School

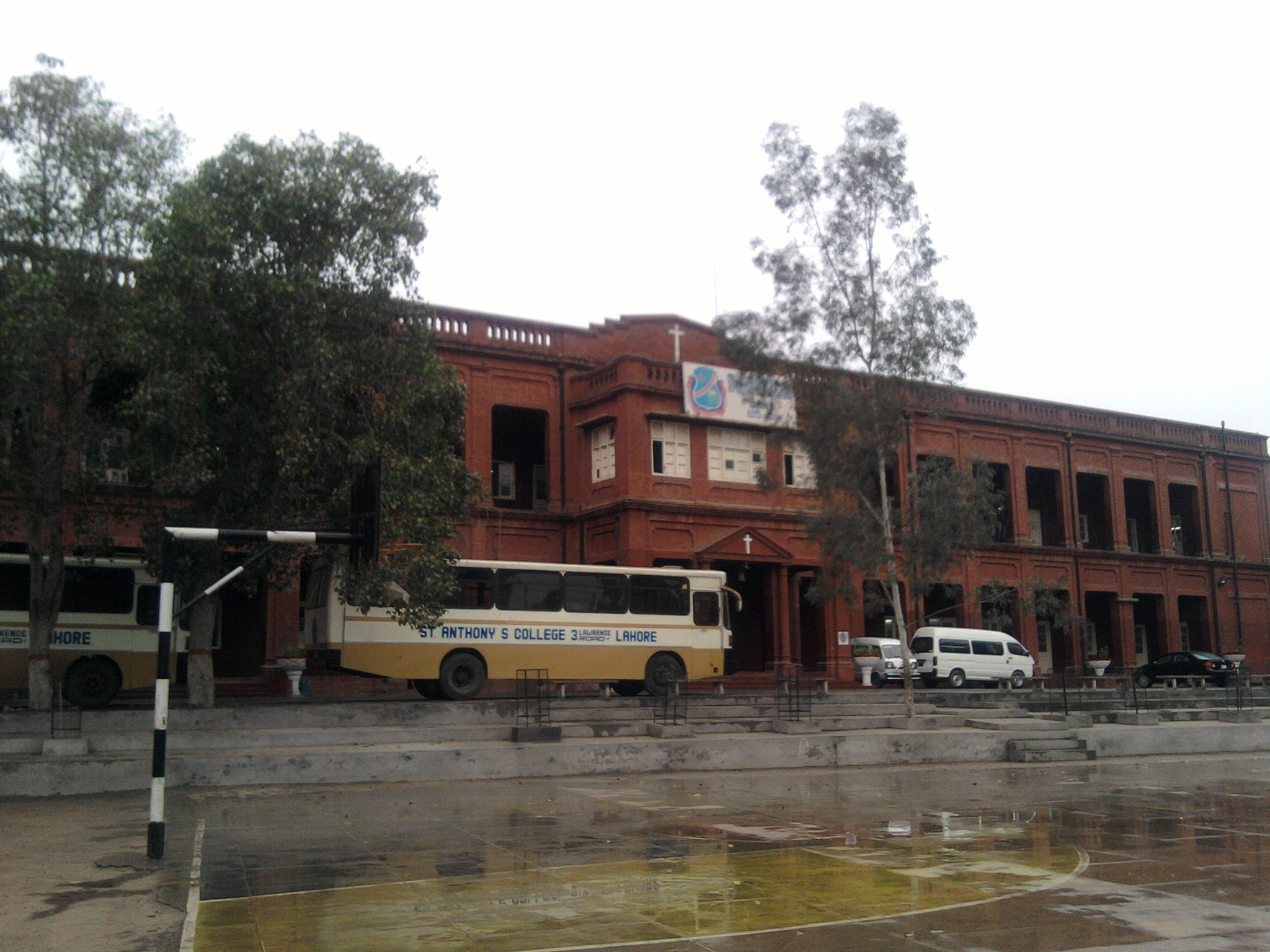
- St. Anthony's College, main building at the Lawrence Road campus

Location
- Lahore, Punjab; Pakistan; 31°33′32″N 74°19′13″E

Information
- Former name: St. Anthony's Catholic Day School
- Type: semi government school, primary, high school and college
- Motto: Latin: Scientia Cum Virtute (Knowledge with Virtue)
- Religious affiliation: Catholicism
- Patron saint: St. Anthony of Padua
- Established: 1 March 1892; 134 years ago
- Principal: Maxwell Shanti
- Grades: K-12
- Gender: Main Branch: Boys; Other branches: co-education
- Colours: Sky blue, grey and navy
- Affiliations: Cambridge University, UK; BISE, Lahore
- Alumni: Anthonians
- Website: stanthonys.edu.pk stanthonysft.edu.pk/home-2/

St. Anthony's High School is a Catholic school system for boys and girls located in Lahore, Punjab, Pakistan. In spite of its name as a high school, the school delivers a pre-school, primary, high school and college education across three campuses in Lahore. Established in 1892 by the Capuchin Friars from Belgium, the school is part of the Roman Catholic Archdiocese of Lahore. The school's main campus is situated at Lahore's historical road, The Mall, adjacent to the Sacred Heart Cathedral.

When Lt. Col (ret) L. C. Rath was the principal in 1992, nearly 2,000 pupils were enrolled at the school with a staff of 100. As of now, the school had more than 100 qualified teachers.

The school's motto is Scientia cum Virtute translated from Latinas "Knowledge with Virtue".

== History ==
St. Anthony's was founded on 1 March 1892 in Peeli Kothi, Empress Road, Lahore by the Capuchin Friars from Belgium. They named it St. Anthony's Catholic Day School. Rt. Reverend Doctor Van Don Bouch performed its opening ceremony with three students at Empress Road Lahore where St. Anthony's Church and Don Bosco School stand today.

As it progressed, its site was shifted to 3-Lawrence Road, where it was renamed St. Anthony's High School in 1900 which was dedicated to St. Anthony of Padua who sympathised with the miserable and gave hope to the despaired people. The Bishop of Lahore Rt. Reverend Van Don Bouch performed the dedication ceremony. Capuchin Father Leo De Brabandere Petrus (1900 - 1902) took over as the first principal of the school and started 'O' Level classes.

In 1911 the last Capuchin Friar principal of St Anthony's, Fr Leopoldus De Ceuster Josephus (1909 - 1911), handed the school over to the Irish Brothers of St Patrick (Patrician Brothers). From 1911 to 1978 sixty Patricians ministered at the school during the 1919 Riots, World War II, and the 1947 Partitioning. During this time the school maintained its high academic reputation in Lahore and Pakistan. At the end of 1978 the Patricians handed the school over to the Irish Marist Fathers, the new principal Fr M. Donnelly (1979 - 1983). The first lay principal was Lieutenant Colonel L.C. Rath (1984 - 1993).

As of 2014 Archbishop Sebastian Francis Shaw was the chairman of the board of governors, H.D.Maxwell Shanthi the executive secretary, and Shahid Ambrose Moghul the principal. There are about 1600 students and about 100 teaching staff at present. The school is upgraded to a college with the approval Archbishop Sebastian Francis Shaw in August 2013. The college was inaugurated by Cardinal Fernando Filoni in the presence of the Apostolic Nancio Edgar Pene Para and Sebastian Francis Shaw, the Archbishop of Lahore.

To honour the legendary war veteran of the Pakistan Air Force, Group Captain Cecil Chaudhry (Late), the Government of Pakistan has renamed a part of Lawrence Road (the road in front of St. Anthony School) as Cecil Chaudhry Road. The renaming ceremony was held at St Anthony's High School on 30 November 2014. The ceremony was attended by friends and family members of the war hero, important personalities of the Christian community and significant civil and military dignitaries.

Pakistan Air Force (PAF) Central Air Command Commanding Air Officer Air Vice Marshal Mujahid Anwar Khan was the chief guest on the occasion.

== Campuses ==
=== Lawrence Road ===
This is the biggest campus of St. Anthony's High School in Lahore and serves as the main campus. The campus has seven buildings as following:

- Kindergarten (KG)
- Preparatory (Prep)
- Primary Section (Classes 1–5)
- Middle Section (Classes 6–8)
- Secondary Section (Classes 9 and 10, for both Matriculation and O Levels)
- Higher Secondary Section (Classes 11 and 12, for both Intermediate and A Levels)
- Offices

It boasts a large library, containing more than 1480 books on various subjects. The school also has a large hall, used for school and inter-school events. There is a basketball court and two large playgrounds. A large canteen is provided for the students and staff in the main ground.

=== Other campuses ===
Apart from the main campus, St. Anthony's High School also has two other campuses in Lahore. They are

- St. Anthony's High School, Faisal Town, Lahore (for Boys & Girls). It was founded in 1990.
- St. Anthony's High School, Lahore Cantt, Lahore (for Boys & Girls). It was founded in 2002.

== Curriculum ==
It offers courses leading to the Cambridge O/A levels and Matriculation. During the academic year, the school has four sets of assessments and two long examinations (Mid-years and Finals).

During Lt. Col. L.C. Rath's principalship, the school won the Educational Trophy from the Board of Secondary Education, Lahore for excellent Matriculation result.

=== Extra-curricular activities ===
Co-curricular and extracurricular activities include debates, excursions, funday, bonfires, picnics, funfair, science model fair and annual sports. In 2006 a cricket under-13 team and an under-16 team formed part of a 47-member delegation including teachers from St Anthony's, travelled to Chandigar, India to play matches with the St John's Cricket Academy team. Cecil Chaudhry was Principal of St Anthony's High School at the time. Students took part in debates and quiz programmes in countries, and in cities of Pakistan.

In 2014, the school restarted publishing The Anthonian annual magazine. The last magazine was published in 1992. The tradition was followed on; as of 4 February 2015, the inauguration for The Anthonian was held in the school hall.

== Notable alumni ==
=== Politicians ===
- Shehbaz Sharif, Prime Minister of Pakistan
- Nawaz Sharif, former prime minister of Pakistan
- Salmaan Taseer, former governor of Punjab
- Sardar Ayaz Sadiq, Speaker of National Assembly Pakistan
- Khurshid Mahmud Kasuri, former minister of foreign affairs (Pakistan)
- Ishaq Dar, former finance minister of Pakistan
- Salman Shah, former finance minister of Pakistan
- Ahmad Mukhtar, former defence minister of Pakistan
- Mushahid Hussain, former minister of information of Pakistan
- Khalid Ranjha, former vice chairman Punjab Bar Council and Federal Minister for Law

=== Armed forces ===
- Major Shabbir Sharif NH SJ Shaheed
- Group Captain (R) Cecil Chaudhry SJ
- Squadron Leader (R) Sarfaraz Ahmed Rafiqui HJ SJ
- Major General (R) Iftikhar Janjua HJ
- Lt. General (R) Jagjit Singh Arora. former C-in-C of India.
- Air Chief Marshal (R) D. A. La Fontaine PVSM AVSM. Former Chief of the Air Staff, India.
- Noel Israel Khokhar HI(M)
- Samson Simon Sharaf, Advisor on Defence, Pakistan Tehreek-e-Insaf

=== Nuclear scientists ===
- Samar Mubarakmand

=== Education ===
- Shoaib Hashmi
- Ishtiaq Ahmed, Professor Emeritus of Political Science, Stockholm University; Honorary Senior Fellow, Institute of South Asian Studies (ISAS), National University of Singapore
- Talal Asad, Professor of Anthropology at the CUNY Graduate Center and influential scholar of religion

=== Sportsmen ===
- Rameez Raja, former Captain Pakistan Cricket Team, commentator
- Wasim Raja
- Saleem Altaf
- Majid Khan, former Captain Pakistan Cricket Team
- Javed Burki
- Shahbaz Ahmad
- Adnan Ahmed
- Duncan Sharpe, former Pakistan Cricket Team
- Adnan Zaka,International Pakistan Junior Hockey Player Under 21 years of age in 1978, under 19 in 1977, Pakistan Universities 1979, University Blue 1979, Roll of

   Honor at Government College Lahore. Played for Chief (Aitchison) College, Vice Captain St. Anthony's High School and University/College and School colors.

- Imran Zaka , International Pakistan Junior Hockey Player Under 21 years of age in 1984, World Cup in 1985, Played for Government College Lahore, St. Anthony's

   Hockey Team Captain, School and College colors

=== Judiciary ===
- Naeem Bukhari, advocate Supreme Court of Pakistan
- Sarmad Jalal Osmany, chief justice Sindh High Court

=== Media ===
- Shoaib Hashmi
- Moammar Rana
- Faisal Rehman
- Asif Raza Mir
- Usman Peerzada, owner of Rafi Peer Theater group
- Najam Sethi

=== Religious leaders ===
- Lawrence Saldanha, former archbishop of Lahore (2001-2011)
- Joseph Coutts, Archbishop of Karachi

=== Civil service ===
- Syed Hassan Raza, diplomat, Ambassador of Pakistan to the State of Qatar
- S. Azmat Hassan
- Babar W. Malik

=== Journalism ===
- Tariq Ali, British political activist, writer, journalist, historian, filmmaker, and public intellectual
- Najam Sethi, TV anchor, editor-in-chief Friday Times and former chairman of Pakistan Cricket Board
- Rashed Rahman, editor Daily Times

=== Other professions ===
- Ishtiaq Ahmed, political scientist
- Jimmy Engineer
