= Babar W. Malik =

Babar W. Malik is a diplomat who has worked in the Foreign Service of Pakistan from 1973 to 2012, serving as ambassador to Turkmenistan (June 4, 1998 – 2003) and High Commissioner of Pakistan to Australia, New Zealand, and Fiji Islands (2003–2012).

== Career ==
Malik was born May 1, 1945, to Akhtar Sultan and Wahid A. Malik in Lahore, and was educated at St. Anthony's High School and Aitchison College. Later, he received a BSc and an MA in English Literature from Fitzwilliam College, Cambridge. Before his postings to Turkmenistan and to Australia, Fiji and New Zealand, Malik was posted to Moscow, Astana, Paris, Mexico, Havanna, Kingston, Jamaica (1974–1975), Rabat (1975–1978), Washington, D.C. (1986–1991) and Cairo (1991–1995).

He is related to Sir Malik Ghulam Muhammad, the third Governor General of Pakistan and is from Kakazai family.
