= Sarmad Jalal Osmany =

Pakistani lawyer (1950–2025)

Justice Sarmad Jalal Osmany (Urdu: سرمد جلال عثمانی; 13 October 1950 – 21 April 2025) was a Pakistani jurist who served as a Justice of the Supreme Court of Pakistan as well as Chief Justice of the Sindh High Court.

== Background ==
Osmany was born on 13 October 1950 in Lahore. He received his early education from St. Anthony's High School, Lahore. He attended the University of Peshawar, where he graduated with a BA in 1971. Later, he obtained his LLB from the University of the Punjab in 1975, and earned an LLM from the London School of Economics in 1978.

Osmany died after a long battle with cancer in Karachi, on 21 April 2025, at the age of 74.

== Career ==
Justice Osmany began his legal career as an associate at a law firm in Karachi between 1979 and 1982, followed by a stint at Shearman & Sterling in New York City from 1983 to 1984, focusing on international trade and banking.

In 1985, Osmany founded his own law firm in Karachi, practising primarily in the fields of banking, shipping, and mergers and acquisitions. He also served as legal adviser to the Privatization Commission of Pakistan.

Justice Osmany also served as a professor of law at Sindh Muslim Law College in Karachi, where he taught from 1980 to 1982 and from 1985 to 1998, covering subjects such as business contracts, company law, and international law.

In 1998, Osmany was appointed a judge of the Sindh High Court. He adjudicated cases related to shipping, banking, property, tax, constitutional, and criminal law. He participated in the Provincial Steering Committee for the Sindh in Pakistan's Judicial and Legal Reform Project, funded by the Asian Development Bank.

On 3 August 2009 Osmany became the Chief Justice of the Sindh High Court.

Justice Osmany also served as the chief legal advisor to the State Bank of Pakistan.
