= Arbab Ali Hakro =

Justice of the Sindh High Court

- ارباب علی ہاکڑو

Justice of the Sindh High Court
- Incumbent
- Assumed office 14 April 2023

Personal details
- Born: 3 August 1976 (age 50)

Arbab Ali Hakro (Urdu: ارباب علی ہاکڑو, born 3 August 1976), is a Pakistani jurist serving as a Justice of the Sindh High Court (SHC) since 14 April 2023.

== Career ==
His appointment as an additional judge to the SHC took place on 14 April 2023, and he took the oath of office as a permanent judge on 14 April 2024.
