= Muhammad Iqbal Kalhoro =

Justice of the Sindh High Court

Justice of the Sindh High Court
- Incumbent
- Assumed office 30 May 2014

Personal details
- Born: 19 July 1968 (age 58)

Muhammad Iqbal Kalhoro (born 19 July 1968) is a Pakistani judge who has been a Justice of the Sindh High Court since 30 May 2014.
