= Ahmed Ali Sheikh =

Chief Justice of the Sindh High Court

Chief Justice of the Sindh High Court
- In office 15 March 2017 – 2 October 2023
- Preceded by: Sajjad Ali Shah
- Succeeded by: Irfan Saadat Khan (Acting)

Senior Justice of the Sindh High Court
- In office 14 December 2015 – 14 March 2017
- Succeeded by: Irfan Saadat Khan

Justice of the Sindh High Court
- In office 25 September 2009 – 2 October 2023

Personal details
- Born: 3 October 1961 (age 65)

Ahmed Ali Sheikh (born 3 October 1961) is a Pakistani jurist who served as the Chief Justice of the Sindh High Court from 15 March 2017 till 2 October 2023. Previously, he was a judge of the Sindh High Court from September 2009 until his appointment as the chief justice of that court.
