= Hassanally A. Rahman =

Pakistani politician (1904–1986)

Hassanally A Rahman (Sindhi: حسن علي رحمان Urdu: حسن علی رحمان) (1909–1986), was born in Karachi, Sindh. He received his barrister-at-law from Middle Temple, England in 1934. He was one of the founding architects along with his younger brother Tufail Ali Abdul Rehman of the Sindh Muslim Government Law College in Karachi. He also served as the first principal of the college. Known as a social and community leader, Rahman was the vice chancellor of Sindh University, Jamshoro, where he served twice in the same capacity.

He was the treasurer of the Pakistan Institute of International Affairs, Secretary General of All Pakistan Educational Society, and President/Board Member Sindh Muslim Law College (S.M. Law College). In 1952, he led the Pakistani delegation to UNESCO and in 1953, represented the country at the Commonwealth University Conference.

Rahman was the older brother of Justice Tufail Ali Abdul Rehman, who also served as Attorney General of Pakistan and the Chief Justice of Sindh and Balochistan High Courts.

The two brothers were the only founding members of the Sindh Muslim Law College.

In addition, Rahman was involved in numerous other projects – from being active in the Pakistan Movement to serving as one of the founding members of Karachi University.

== Career ==
Hassanally became a barrister and was also politically active in the British Raj. He along with other fellow barristers worked with Muhammed Ali Jinnah, the founder of Pakistan.
