= Zulfiqar Ali Sangi =

Justice of the Sindh High Court

- ذوالفقار علی سنگی

Justice of the Sindh High Court
- Incumbent
- Assumed office 29 August 2019

Personal details
- Born: 15 September 1973 (age 53)

Zulfiqar Ali Sangi (Urdu: ذوالفقار علی سنگی, born 15 September 1973) is a Pakistani jurist serving as a Justice of the Sindh High Court (SHC) since 29 August 2019.

== Career ==
Prior to his judicial career, he practiced as an advocate at the Supreme Court of Pakistan. His appointment as an additional judge of the SHC took place on 29 August 2019, and he was sworn in as a permanent judge of that court on 4 August 2021.

== Verdicts ==
He served on the bench that acquitted Muttahida Qaumi Movement – Pakistan (MQM-P) leader Amir Khan and co-accused Tariq alias Bata. They had previously been convicted in connection to the murder of MQM workers Anam Aziz and Muhammad Naeem.

Additionally, Sangi was part of the bench that acquitted all five individuals accused of killing rights activist Perween Rahman. The accused had been previously convicted for her murder and sentenced by an Anti-Terrorism Court. The bench, in its hearing, stated that the prosecution had failed to prove any offence against the accused beyond a reasonable doubt.
