= Mariam Behnam =

Iranian-Emirati writer, activist, and diplomat (1921–2014)

- مریم بهنام
- 1965 upon receipt of the Nishane Taj medal
- Born: 25 February 1921; Bandar Lengeh, Hormozgan Province, Iran
- Died: 4 December 2014 (aged 93); Dubai, United Arab Emirates
- Other name: Maryam Behnam
- Occupations: writer, women's rights activist, diplomat
- Years active: 1946–2009
- Children: 5 (2 step-children, 3 children)

Mariam Behnam (Persian: مریم بهنام, 25 February 1921 – 4 December 2014) was an Iranian-born Emirati writer, diplomat and women's rights activist. After graduating from high school and beginning her career as a teacher in Pakistan, she returned to Iran and began to work on social improvement projects first in Teheran and later in Bandar Abbas. In the 1960s, she returned to Pakistan and served for eight years as a cultural attaché establishing cultural centers, libraries and promoting Iranian culture. She was honored with the Iranian Order of the Crown and a Pakistani badge of courage for remaining in the country and continuing her work during the Indo-Pakistani War of 1965, when other diplomats fled the country. Returning to Iran in 1972, she worked with the Ministry of Arts and Culture in the Sistan and Baluchestan Province and later the Hormozgan Province developing programs to preserve and promote the cultural heritage of the areas.

In 1978, Behnam fled Iran during the Iranian revolution and settled in Dubai. She worked as a newspaper writer and then co-founded the cultural magazine Al Juma to promote the arts. She joined women's organizations and advocated for improved rights for women and helped instigate training programs to preserve traditional crafts. Beginning in the 1990s, she published several novels and an autobiography, as well as poetry. In 2010, Behnam was honored as the Emirates Woman of the Year.

== Early life and education ==
Mariam Behnam was born on 25 February 1921 in Bandar Lengeh in the Hormozgan Province of Iran to Hafsa Abbas and Abdul Wahid Behnam. Her wealthy family was involved in the pearl trade and owned homes in "Bombay, Bahrain, Dubai, Karachi and Paris". Because she was born in the same year that an earthquake hit her hometown, and had a forceful personality, Behnam was given the nickname "Zelzelah Bibi" (Little Earthquake). Her mother died when she was ten years old and Wahid was raised, along with her five surviving siblings, by her maternal grandmother, Monkhali (née Kingely) Abbas. Against her family's wishes, who saw no reason for girls to be educated, she pressed to go to public school and was finally granted permission to attend the Jufel Hurst High School in Karachi.

At the age of eighteen, Behnam married her Saudi Arabian cousin, Zakaria Siddique Bundakji and moved to Bombay. The marriage was short-lived, when her husband abandoned her and moved to South Africa and remarried. Behnam returned to Karachi, where in 1944, she gave birth to their son, Essa. After she filed for an annulment which took seven years to obtain, she returned to school in Bombay and then matriculated in Lahore in 1946, becoming the first woman in her family to graduate from a public school.

== Career ==
Despite family objections, Behnam became a teacher at her alma mater, Jufel Hurst High School. In 1947, Behnam took her grandmother on a lengthy trip to Dubai and Bahrain, where they received an invitation to reconnect with Behnam's father, whom they had not seen for many years. Behnam traveled to Iran and stayed three months and upon her return to Karachi, was invited by her father to relocate to Teheran. Moving with her son, she first worked on implementation of the Point Four Plan to improve health and education throughout the country. In the early 1950s, she allowed her son to go and live with his father, and soon thereafter, Behnam married a widower, Abdulla Pakravan, who had two children from a previous marriage, gave up her career, and moved to Bandar Abbas.

Her retirement was short-lived, and in 1956, after a year in Bandar Abbas, Behnam became involved in a project to establish a high school for girls and joined the Ministry of Education. That same year, she gave birth to a daughter, Shahnaz, who was followed within a year by a second daughter, Shirin. Behnam's improvement projects in Bandar Abbas included establishing courses at the high school for health and offering pre-natal and ante-natal courses on childcare. Joining several social and cultural organizations, she spearheaded projects to establish an arts and crafts center, the first cinema, a public garden, a public library and founded the Museum of Anthropology.

In 1963, Behnam transferred from the Ministry of Education to the Ministry of Arts and Culture. In 1964, she returned to Pakistan to teach Persian in Lahore at the Iranian Cultural Center. Returning to school while simultaneously working, she earned a bachelor's degree in 1967 and then a master's degree in literature from the University of Punjab in Lahore. Upon earning her bachelor's degree, Behnam was promoted to director of the Cultural Center, becoming the first Iranian woman appointed as a cultural attaché. During this time frame, there was considerable unrest in Pakistan as well as two wars: the Indo-Pakistani War of 1965 and Bangladesh Liberation War in 1971. Behnam chose to remain at her post, though most foreigners were evacuated. In 1965, she was awarded the Nishane Taj Medal for her bravery by the Shah and in 2010 was awarded a badge of courage from Pakistan.

In 1972, after eight years in Lahore, Behnam returned to Iran, moving to Teheran. She was first placed in a department developing audio-visual educational technology, but within three years, was made director general of Arts and Culture for the Sistan and Baluchestan Province. She established a training school in Zahedan to preserve the art work of the area and improve the perception of artisans and their crafts. In 1977, after two years in Zahedan, Behnam moved back to Bandar Abbas, and was asked to run for a Parliamentary seat by the Ministry. Having little political aspiration, she did not campaign and lost her race, instead accepting the directorship of Arts and Culture for the Hormozgan Province.

When the Iranian Revolution intensified in 1978, Behnam fled the country and moved to Dubai. Within a week of her arrival in the United Arab Emirates, she began working as a journalist at the newly launched Gulf News. For three years, she worked as a features writer for the English-language newspaper. In the 1980s, she joined the Gulf News Ladies Society and worked as a promoter organizing exhibits for traditional women's handicrafts. At the time, the Emirati art was not widely publicized, and she helped found and publish the magazine, Al Juma. She began publishing poems in English, Persian, and Urdu and subsequently published four books, the first of which was her autobiography, Zelzelah: A woman before her time. When the Gulf News Ladies Society closed, Behnam joined the Dubai International Women's Club advocating for women's rights and working as a motivational speaker. She was honored as the Emirates Woman of the Year in 2010.

== Death and legacy ==
Behnam died on 4 December 2014 in Dubai, and was buried at the Al Qouz Cemetery At the time of her death, she was working on a fifth book of fiction.

== Works ==
- Naghshi az doost: Selected speeches of Mariam Behnam during her appointment in Pakistan. Lahore, Pakistan: Pakistan-Iran Friendship Society. 1972. OCLC 818861120. Later republished as Role of a Friend in the 1990s.
- Zelzelah: A woman before her time. Dubai, United Arab Emirites: Motivate. 1994. ISBN 978-1-873-54452-5.
- Heirloom: Evening tales from the east. Karachi/Oxford: Oxford University Press. 2001. ISBN 978-0-195-79329-1.
- Raindrops: A journey through life. Dubai, UAE: Motivate Publishing. 2003. ISBN 978-1-860-63148-1.
