= Duncan Sharpe =

Pakistani cricketer

Personal information
- Full name: Duncan Albert Sharpe
- Born: 3 August 1937 (age 89); Rawalpindi, Punjab, British India
- Batting: Right-handed
- Bowling: Right-arm off-break
- Role: Batsman

International information
- National side: Pakistan
- Test debut (cap 32): 13 November 1959 v Australia
- Last Test: 9 December 1959 v Australia

Domestic team information
- Years: Team
- 1957/58: Punjab A
- 1958/59: Pakistan Railways
- 1959/60–1960/61: Lahore
- 1961/62–1965/66: South Australia

Career statistics
Competition	Test	First-class
Matches	3	37
Runs scored	134	1,531
Batting average	22.33	27.33
100s/50s	0/1	2/7
Top score	56	118
Balls bowled	–	154
Wickets	–	1
Bowling average	–	100.00
5 wickets in innings	–	0
10 wickets in match	–	0
Best bowling	–	1/35
Catches/stumpings	2/–	41/13
- Source: CricketArchive, 28 January 2009

Duncan Albert Sharpe (born 3 August 1937) is a Pakistani former cricketer who played in three Test matches in 1959–60. Sharpe is of Anglo-Indian heritage, and was the third Christian to play Test cricket for Pakistan. He has lived in Australia since 1961.

== Career in Pakistan ==
Sharpe's family had lived in British India since the middle of the 19th century as their ancestors migrated from England. They were relatives of the English novelist William Thackeray. Sharpe was born in Rawalpindi but grew up in Lahore, where his mother was a nurse. He was one of three brothers, who were all sent to board at St. Anthony High School, Lahore, after their parents separated. Duncan Sharpe took a job as a clerk with Pakistan Railways when he was 17. He was described as a "strikingly handsome man who was once genuinely mistaken for the actor Cary Grant". Sharpe occasionally wrote articles for the Lahore-based Civil and Military Gazette.

Sharpe played his first match of first-class cricket as a middle-order batsman for a Railways and Baluchistan team against the touring MCC team in Multan in 1955–56. In his next match, in the 1957–58 Quaid-e-Azam Trophy for Punjab A against Bahawalpur, he kept wicket. Apart from his Tests he kept wicket during most of his career in Pakistan.

He was twelfth man for two Tests when the West Indies toured Pakistan in 1958–59, and he toured England with Pakistan Eaglets, a team of promising young players, in 1959, scoring 1608 runs on a three-month tour of non-first-class matches.

After a total of nine first-class matches and 255 runs at an average of 21.25 and a top score of 67, Sharpe made his Test debut for Pakistan against Australia in Dacca on 13 November 1959. Batting at number five, he scored 56 and 35, more runs than any of his teammates in a low-scoring match that Pakistan lost. He was not successful in the next two Tests.

He made his first first-class century later that season, 118 for a Combined XI against the touring Indian Starlets in Lahore. In 1960–61 he scored 109 for Lahore against Rawalpindi and Peshawar in the Ayub Trophy semi-final in Lahore.

== Career in Australia ==
Disappointed by his non-selection for Pakistan's 1960–61 tour of India, Sharpe decided to emigrate to Australia. Sponsored by Barry Jarman, he moved to Adelaide in 1961 and played Sheffield Shield cricket with South Australia alongside the likes of Gary Sobers and Jarman from 1961–62 to 1965–66. He hit 50 not out in the first Sheffield Shield match of the season in 1961–62 against Western Australia but was less successful thereafter and played irregularly. His highest score for South Australia was 72 in the first match of the 1965–66 season against Victoria, but his next match was also his last; like his first, ten years earlier, it was against a touring MCC team – for whom Ken Barrington and Jim Parks had played in both matches.

Don Bradman found him a job assisting the groundsman at Adelaide Oval, and he developed his skills and qualifications and later became a foreman of parks and gardens in Melbourne.

Sharpe lives with his wife Gillian in Melbourne. They have six children. He also has a son from an earlier marriage in Pakistan.
