= Syed Sajjad Ali Shah =

Pakistani jurist

Syed Sajjad Ali Shah سید سجاد علی شاہ
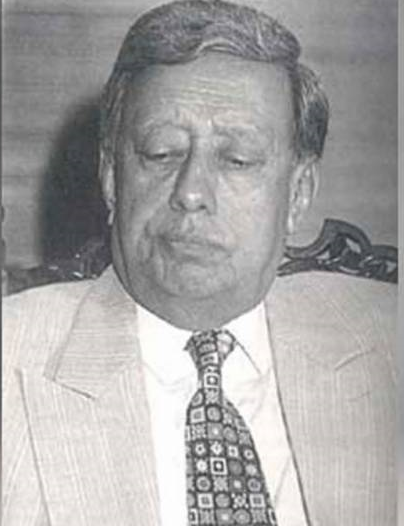

13th Chief Justice of Pakistan
- In office 4 June 1994 – 2 December 1997
- Appointed by: Benazir Bhutto, Prime Minister of Pakistan
- Preceded by: Saad Saud Jan (Acting)
- Succeeded by: Ajmal Mian

6th Chief Justice of Sindh High Court
- In office 13 December 1989 – 4 November 1990
- Preceded by: Ajmal Mian
- Succeeded by: Saeed-uz-Zaman Siddiqui

Personal details
- Born: 17 February 1933 Karachi, Bombay Presidency, British India (now Pakistan)
- Died: 7 March 2017 (aged 84) Karachi, Sindh, Pakistan
- Education: S. M. Law College; Lincoln's Inn

Syed Sajjad Ali Shah (Urdu: سید سجاد علی شاہ; 17 February 1933 – 7 March 2017) was a Pakistani judge who served as the 13th Chief Justice of Pakistan from 4 June 1994 to 2 December 1997. He was appointed as Chief Justice of the Supreme Court by Benazir Bhutto. He had earlier served as the 6th Chief Justice of Sindh High Court from 13 December 1989 to 4 November 1990.

== Early life and career ==
Shah was born on 17 February 1933 in Karachi. He enrolled as an advocate in 1959, and eventually became a district public prosecutor, an additional district and sessions judge, and, later, a district and sessions judge.

He was appointed as joint secretary in the federal Ministry of Law and Parliamentary Affairs and, in 1977, was posted as the Registrar of the Supreme Court. In 1987, he was made a judge of the Sindh High Court 1987.

Shah served as the Chief Justice of Sindh High Court from 13 December 1989 to 4 November 1990.

== Chief Justice of Pakistan ==
When Dr. Nasim Hasan Shah retired as Chief Justice of Pakistan in 1994, Justice Saad Saud Jan should have taken his place based on seniority. But Prime Minister Benazir Bhutto threw tradition overboard when she bypassed two senior judges and appointed Sajjad Ali Shah as Chief Justice of Pakistan. Later, she was dismissed by President Farooq Leghari on charges of corruption, and Sajjad Ali Shah, along with six other judges of the Supreme Court, upheld this decision. Reading from a 12-page short order, Chief Justice Sajjad Ali Shah said:

"The presidential order contained enough substance and adequate material had been provided to conclude that the government could not be run in accordance with the provisions of the constitution and that an appeal to the electorate had become necessary."

He became a critic of Nawaz Sharif and matters came to a head in 1997 when Sharif was defending himself in Supreme Court against accusations of corruption. An unruly mob stormed into the Supreme Court, forcing CJ Sajjad Ali Shah to adjourn the case against PM Nawaz Sharif. Hundreds of Sharif supporters broke through the police cordon around the courthouse and the Chief Justice had to flee for his safety. The police managed to restore order only after baton charging and tear gassing the mob, both inside and outside the courthouse.

President Leghari had given his support to Sharif. He was appalled by the measures being taken by the government but had no powers to dismiss it since the Eighth Amendment had been revoked. He was particularly concerned when he was asked by the government to dismiss Syed Sajjad Ali Shah and appoint an acting Chief Justice of Pakistan. He, therefore, resigned on 2 December 1997. Shortly afterwards, Muhammad Rafiq Tarar was elected to replace him as the President. On 23 December, Ajmal Mian was appointed as permanent Chief Justice. Sajjad Ali Shah had been dismissed.

== Death ==
Syed Sajjad Ali Shah died at the age of 84 on 7 March 2017 in Karachi after suffering from severe chest infection.

== Other services ==
- Former Chairman of Iran-Pakistan Friendship Association

== Works ==
- Law Courts in a Glass House: An Autobiography, ISBN 978-0195795615

== See also ==
- Chief Justice of Pakistan
- Supreme Court of Pakistan
- List of Pakistanis

Legal offices
Preceded by Saad Saud Jan; Acting	Chief Justice of Pakistan; 1994–1997	Succeeded by Ajmal Mian
Preceded by Ajmal Mian	Chief Justice of the Sindh High Court; 13 December 1989 – 4 November 1990	Succeeded by Saeed-uz-Zaman Siddiqui
