= Shahida Jamil =

Pakistani lawyer and politician

Shahida Nighat Jamil (born 30 January 1944 as Shahida Nighat Sulaiman) is a Pakistani lawyer, politician and a former Law Minister of Pakistan.

== Early education and family ==
Jamil is the only daughter of the late Shah Ahmed Sulaiman (a businessman and son of Justice Sir Shah Sulaiman) and the late Begum Akhtar Sulaiman (a prominent social worker and daughter of Huseyn Shaheed Suhrawardy).

She was called to the Bar in 1973. Prior to that she graduated from Sindh Muslim Law College and holds a Bachelor of Arts degree in political science and English literature from Karachi University through St. Joseph's College.

She is married to Chaudhry Mohammad Jamil (a senior advocate of the Supreme Court of Pakistan and former vice-president of the Supreme Court Bar Association of Pakistan). They have two sons, Zahid Jamil (a barrister in Karachi) and Shahid Jamil (an attorney in Chicago).

== Political career ==
She became the first woman to be appointed the Law Minister of Sindh province in 1999 and became the Minister of Law, Justice and Human Rights and Parliamentary Affairs of Pakistan in 2000. She has also served as Minister for Women Development, Social Welfare and Special Education in the caretaker government of Prime Minister Mohammad Mian Soomro from 2007 to 2008.

== Publications ==
She has conducted an in-depth research study on different subjects such as Socio-Political Environment as an Element of Power and its impact on National Security, Crime Reporting, Internal Security Systems in South Asia & Dimensions of National Security etc.

== Teaching experience ==
She has been teaching in SM Law College as a law professor for LLB and LLM programs for several years. Currently, she is serving as a visiting professor at the School of Law, University of Karachi. Her work focuses on human rights law and comparative constitutional law.

Articles published by her include Independence of the Judiciary, International Humanitarian Law, The Daily News in 1992, The Legacy of Negativism, The Leader in 1995, In which the name of Allah is commemorated – Al-Quran, The Nation in 1997, and The Armed Forces and the Pakistan Movement, The Dawn in 1997.

== Sources ==
- https://web.archive.org/web/20110604190632/http://www.infopak.gov.pk/WomenDevelopmentminister.aspx
- http://www.pakistanherald.com/profile/Barrister-Shahida-Jamil-1124
