= Noel Israel Khokhar =

Pakistani military officer

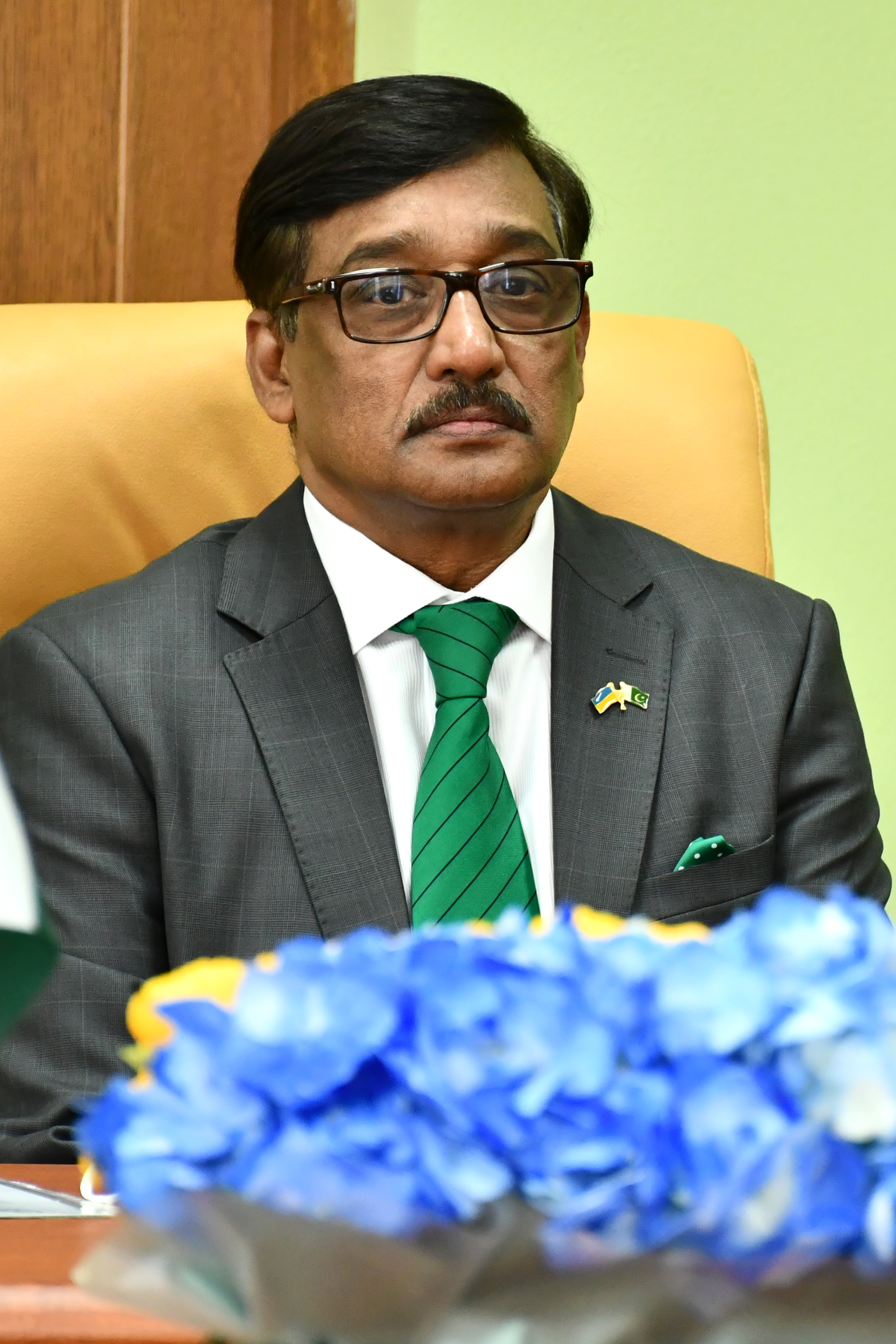

Director General ISSRA
- In office 27 November 2013 – 25 July 2016

Director General ISSRA
- In office 16 June 2011 – 16 October 2011

General Officer Commanding 23rd Infantry Division Jhelum
- In office January 2010 – June 2011

Personal details
- Born: 24 October 1960 (age 65) Lahore, Pakistan
- Education: St. Anthony High School, Lahore; Forman Christian College; Institute of Advanced Studies in National Defence; Royal College of Defence Studies; Quaid-i-Azam University; King's College London; National Defence University, Pakistan
- Occupation: Member Editorial Board for the Journal of the National Defence University
- Awards: Hilal-i-Imtiaz (Military)

Military service
- Years of service: 1976–2016
- Rank: Major General
- Unit: 9th Medium Regiment Artillery Corps
- Commands: DG ISSRA; Chief Instructor A-Division National Defence University; GOC 23rd Division; Instructor Pakistan Military Academy; Instructor Quetta Command & Staff College

Noel Israel Khokhar is a retired major general of the Pakistani Army who was later appointed as Ambassador for Pakistan to Ukraine.

== Early life and education ==
He was born in Lahore and attended the St. Anthony's High School in Lahore and Forman Christian College. Khokhar joined the Pakistan Army and passed out from the 62nd PMA Long Course in 1976 and was commissioned in the 9th Medium Regiment of the Pakistan Army Artillery on 24 October 1980.

== Military career ==
He served in a variety of command and staff positions as well as with the United Nations. He has also been an instructor in Pakistan Military Academy, Pakistan Command and Staff College, and the National Defence University. In these roles he helped implement significant reforms to bolster Pakistan's counter-terrorism capabilities through coordinated military and civil education programs.

He is also a graduate from the Institute of Advanced Studies in National Defence and Royal College of Defence Studies in the United Kingdom. He also holds a master's degree from Quaid-i-Azam University and King's College London and a PhD in International Relations.

On 9 May 2009, the Army Promotion Board in Rawalpindi promoted Brigadier Khokhar to the rank of major general.

Khokhar was General Officer Commanding in 2010.

In 2011, Major General Khokhar commanded the 23rd Division. Khokhar had also been Chief Instructor of the A-Division at the National Defence University, Islamabad. In 2011, the President of Pakistan, Asif Ali Zardari awarded Khokhar the Hilal-i-Imtiaz (M). He had also been serving as DG ISSRA, a think tank at the NDU.

In 2011, he was also on the editorial board of the National Defence University Journal, Islamabad. He is one of the only Christian officers who have made it to the rank of major general.

He retired in August 2016 after serving for 36 years.

== Later life ==
He served as the Ambassador of Pakistan to Ukraine from November 2020 to November 2022. He played great role in deepening Pak Ukraine relations. During Ukraine Russia conflict, he personally led successful evacuation of Pakistanis from conflict zone.

== Awards and decorations ==

	Hilal-i-Imtiaz (Military) (Crescent of Excellence)			
Tamgha-e-Baqa (Nuclear Test Medal) 1998	Tamgha-e-Istaqlal Pakistan (Escalation with India Medal) 2002	10 Years Service Medal		
20 Years Service Medal	30 Years Service Medal	35 Years Service Medal		
Tamgha-e-Sad Saala Jashan-e- Wiladat-e-Quaid-e-Azam (100th Birth Anniversary of Muhammad Ali Jinnah) 1976	Hijri Tamgha (Hijri Medal) 1979	Jamhuriat Tamgha (Democracy Medal) 1988	Qarardad-e-Pakistan Tamgha (Resolution Day Golden Jubilee Medal) 1990	Tamgha-e-Salgirah Pakistan (Independence Day Golden Jubilee Medal)

== See also ==
- Ashok Kumar (soldier)
