= Adnanul Karim Memon =

Justice of the Sindh High Court
- Incumbent
- Assumed office 30 November 2016

Personal details
- Born: 8 January 1971 (age 55)

Adnanul Karim Memon (born 8 January 1971) is a Pakistani judge who has been a Justice of the Sindh High Court since 30 November 2016.
