= Arshad Hussain Khan =

Justice of the Sindh High Court

- ارشد حسین خان

Justice of the Sindh High Court
- Incumbent
- Assumed office 29 June 2016

Personal details
- Born: 5 February 1967 (age 59)

Arshad Hussain Khan (born 5 February 1967) is a Pakistani jurist serving as a Justice of the Sindh High Court since 29 June 2016.

== Judicial career ==
Khan was appointed as a judge of the Sindh High Court (SHC) on 29 June 2016.

In April 2024, Khan was part of a SHC division bench that ordered authorities to expedite investigations into cases of enforced disappeared and to compensate affected families.
