= Faisal Kamal Alam =

Justice of the Sindh High Court

Muhammad Faisal Kamal Alam

Justice of the Sindh High Court
- Incumbent
- Assumed office 30 October 2015

Personal details
- Born: 8 May 1969 (age 57)

Muhammad Faisal Kamal Alam (born 8 May 1969) is a Pakistani jurist. He has been a Justice of the Sindh High Court since 30 October 2015.

== Career ==
From 2009 to 2014, Alam practiced in Abu Dhabi, United Arab Emirates, specializing in commercial, service, regulatory, election, and constitutional law disputes.

In July 2014, Alam was appointed as Advisor Legal Affairs to the President of Pakistan, serving in this capacity until October 29, 2015. He assumed his current role as a judge of the Sindh High Court on October 30, 2015. During his tenure as a judge, he has served as a chairman of the Legal Research Cell at the Sindh High Court, member of the Information Technology Committee, and member of the Board of Governors for the Sindh Institute of Medical Sciences (SIMS).
