= Yousuf Ali Sayeed =

Justice of the Sindh High Court
- Incumbent
- Assumed office 30 November 2016

Personal details
- Born: 19 August 1971 (age 55) Karachi, Pakistan
- Spouse: Zainab Lodi Sayeed
- Children: 4

Yousuf Ali Sayeed (born 19 August 1971) is a Pakistani jurist who has been a Justice of the Sindh High Court since 30 November 2016.

== Early life and education ==
Yousuf Ali Sayeed studied at the Karachi Grammar School, before going on to study law at the University of Buckingham, from where he obtained an LLB with Hons.
