= Jufelhurst School =

Location
- Garden East, Karachi; Pakistan
- Coordinates: 24°52′51″N 67°02′07″E

Information
- Other name: Jufelhurst Government High School
- Type: State school
- Established: 1931
- Founder: Sybil D'Abreo
- Enrollment: 1700 (2013)
- Language: English and Urdu
- Campus size: 1 acre

Jufelhurst School, officially known as Jufelhurst Government High School, is a government school located in the Garden East quarter of Karachi, Sindh, Pakistan. Situated on an approximately one-acre campus in Soldier Bazaar, the school operates within a complex of stone buildings established in the early 20th century. The complex has two buildings, a playground, and a residence for the principal of the school.

== History ==
Jufelhurst School was founded by Goan Catholic educationist Sybil D'Abreo in 1931 on her residential estate located in Cincinnatus Town. Sybil D'Abreo named the school after her parents by combining the initials of her parents Julia and Felix into the coined word "Jufel" and adding "hurst" to evoke the surrounding trees. Classes began in three rooms of her bungalow and expanded during the 1930s as enrolment rose among children of diverse faiths living nearby.

In 1974, the school was nationalised by the Government of Pakistan.

In the 1980s the medium of instruction formally shifted from English to Urdu under the Zia administration.

From 2012 onward, conservationists repeatedly petitioned to place the buildings on the Sindh protected heritage list after the Sindh Building Control Authority labelled them unsafe and slated them for demolition. On the night between 8 and 9 April 2017 part of D'Abreo’s bungalow, integral to the campus, was bulldozed despite its proposed heritage status. Subsequent legal challenges and advocacy by the Heritage Foundation of Pakistan and former students secured interim protection orders to protect the remaining structures from demolition.

As of 2013, around 1,700 students were studying at the school.

== Facilities ==
The Jufelhurst campus covers approximately 5,704 square yards and contains four principal structures arranged around a central playground. The grounds feature mature vegetation, including banyan and neem trees. As of 2012, two classroom blocks are operational. The remaining blocks, including the original bungalow and a science laboratory wing, are non-operational due to structural issues, including roof collapse and compromised ceilings. The site also includes a canteen, staff housing, and a caretaker's residence.

== Notable alumni ==
- Mariam Behnam, Iranian writer
- Muhammad Shafi Siddiqui, justice of the Supreme Court of Pakistan
