= Sindh Muslim Law College =

Law school within the University of Karachi, Pakistan

Coordinates: 24.8526166°N 67.0136461°E

- Motto: "Establish weight with justice and fall not short in the balance"
- Type: Public
- Established: 28 June 1947
- Affiliations: University of Karachi; Pakistan Bar Council
- Principal: Fareed Ahmed Dayo
- Location: Karachi, Sindh, Pakistan
- Campus: Urban

The Sindh Muslim Government Law College (Urdu: سنده مسلم گورنمنٹس لا کالج) or S. M. Law College (Urdu: ایس ایم لاء کالج) is one of the oldest law schools of Pakistan, situated in Karachi, Sindh. The college has produced numerous notables including Chief Justices of Pakistan, Chief Justices of Federal Shariat Court, Chief Ministers of Sindh, Federal Ministers, and many judges of the Supreme Court of Pakistan and Sindh High Court.

The college was established by its first Principal Hassanally A. Rahman, a leading Advocate of Sindh on the June 28, 1947 and was affiliated to the University of Sindh. It started functioning at Sindh-Madrasa-tul-Islam. After the closure of Shahani Law College, the college shifted to its present building in 1948 and is affiliated with the University of Karachi.

== Library ==
The college has one of the oldest law library in Pakistan. The library is an important resource centre, primarily intended to provide undergraduate and postgraduate students with the books, law journals and reading materials they need for their studies, as well as having a valuable and ever increasing collection of legal works. The library contains over 50,000 volumes, the core of which is a comprehensive range of legal materials for practitioners, law students and faculty members.

== Former faculty ==
- Fareed A.Dayo (Principal from 2023 and on going)
- Barrister Khursheed A. Hashmi (Principal from 2001 till 2021)
- Justice Syed Ali Aslam Jafri (Principal from 2019 to 2021)
- Justice Haziqul Khairi (Principal from 1981 to 1988)
- Zulfikar Ali Bhutto (former President and Prime Minister of Pakistan)

== Alumni ==
=== Chief Justices of Pakistan ===
- Syed Sajjad Ali Shah
- Saeeduzzaman Siddiqui
- Gulzar Ahmed

=== Chief Justice and Senior Judges of the Federal Shariat Court ===
- Haziq-ul-Khairi
- S. A. Rabbani
- Mir Hazar Khan Khoso
- Agha Rafiq Ahmed Khan

=== Supreme Court of Pakistan judges ===
- Tufail Ali Abdul Rehman
- Wajihuddin Ahmed
- Faisal Arab

=== Sindh High Court judges ===
- Honorable Mr. Justice S. A. Rabbani
- Majida Rizvi
- Syed Ghous Ali Shah
- Zafar Hussain Mirza
- Nadeem Azhar Siddiqui
- Omar Sial

=== Other notable persons ===
- Justice S. A. Rabbani (Legendary Jurist of Pakistan, a former Superior Court Judge, Director General Sindh Judicial Academy, Chairman - Pakistan Copyright Board, Addl. Secretary, National Assembly of Pakistan, Judge, Federal Shariat Court of Pakistan, Chairman - Appellate Tribunal for Local Councils, Author, Teacher.. and Much more. )
- Ram Jethmalani - Eminent Indian Criminal defense Lawyer, Bharatiya Janata Party Leader, Minister of Law and Justice in the year 1996 and 1999. He was also Union minister of urban affairs and employment in 1998.
- Makhdoom Ali Khan – Senior Advocate Supreme Court, former Attorney General of Pakistan and chairman Pakistan Bar Council
- Syed Qaim Ali Shah – Chief Minister of Sindh
- Rana Muhammad Akram Khan, former Chairman Punjab Bar Council.
- Ghous Ali Shah – former Chief Minister of Sindh, former Defence Minister of Pakistan, former Federal Education Minister
- Shahida Jamil – former Federal Minister for Women Development, former Minister for Law, Human Rights, Social Welfare and Environment
- Naimatullah Khan – former Mayor of Karachi
- Nisha Rao - lawyer and transgender activist
- Farooq H. Naik – Chairman of the Senate of Pakistan, former Federal Minister for Law and Human Rights
- Farman Fatehpuri – eminent scholar of Urdu language and literature
- Khalid Ali Z. Qazi – former Education Minister of Sindh, former Additional Advocate General of Sindh. Currently the Vice Chancellor of Shaheed Zulfiqar Ali Bhutto University of Law.
- Rasul Bux Palejo (1930 - 2018) – senior politician of Sindh, Pakistan

== See also ==
- List of colleges in Karachi
- Education in Pakistan
