= Ajmal Mian =

Pakistani judge (1934–2017)

Ajmal Mian اجمل میاں

14th Chief Justice of Pakistan
- In office 23 December 1997 – 30 June 1999
- Appointed by: Wasim Sajjad
- Preceded by: Syed Sajjad Ali Shah
- Succeeded by: Saeeduzzaman Siddiqui

Chief Justice Sindh High Court
- In office 4 September 1988 – 12 December 1989
- Preceded by: Naimuddin Ahmed
- Succeeded by: Syed Sajjad Ali Shah

Personal details
- Born: 4 July 1934 Delhi, British India (now India)
- Died: 16 October 2017 (aged 83) Karachi
- Education: University of Karachi; Inns of Court School of Law

Ajmal Mian (Urdu: اجمل میاں) (4 July 1934 – 16 October 2017) was a Pakistani jurist who served as the Chief Justice of the Supreme Court of Pakistan from 23 December 1997 to 30 June 1999.

He was born into Punjabi Saudagaran community of Delhi, on 4 July 1934. He earned his bachelor's degree in economics and political science from the University of Karachi in 1953 and law degree from Lincoln's Inn in 1957.

He died in Karachi at age 83 after a prolonged illness. He is survived by a widow, three sons and two daughters.

== See also ==
- List of Pakistanis
- Chief Justice of Pakistan

Legal offices
Preceded by Syed Sajjad Ali Shah	Chief Justice of Pakistan; 1997–1999	Succeeded by Saeeduzzaman Siddiqui
Preceded by Naimuddin Ahmed	Chief Justice of the Sindh High Court; 4 September 1988 – 12 December 1989	Succeeded by Syed Sajjad Ali Shah
