= Irfan Saadat Khan =

Justice of the Supreme Court of Pakistan
- Incumbent
- Assumed office 3 November 2023

Acting Chief Justice of the Sindh High Court
- In office 3 October 2023 – 2 November 2023
- Preceded by: Ahmed Ali Sheikh
- Succeeded by: Aqeel Ahmed Abbasi

Senior Justice of the Sindh High Court
- In office 15 March 2017 – 2 October 2023
- Preceded by: Ahmed Ali Sheikh

Justice of the Sindh High Court
- In office 25 September 2009 – 2 November 2023

Personal details
- Born: 7 February 1963 (age 63)

Irfan Saadat Khan (born 7 February 1963) is a Pakistani jurist who has been serving as a judge of the Supreme Court of Pakistan since 3 November 2023. He previously also served as the Acting Chief Justice of the Sindh High Court.

== Career ==
Khan was enrolled as an advocate of the District Court on September 10, 1989, to the Sindh High Court on October 27, 1991, and to the Supreme Court of Pakistan on October 6, 2008.

Khan was appointed as a judge of the Sindh High Court on September 25, 2009. He became Senior Puisne Judge on March 13, 2017, and later served as the acting Chief Justice of the Sindh High Court in October 2023. He has been a member of the Judicial Commission of Pakistan since 2017.

Khan has served as the monitoring judge for the districts of Malir, East, Shaheed Benazirabad, and Sanghar, and oversaw the judiciary of Sindh from 2017 to 2023.
