= Omar Sial =

Justice of the Sindh High Court
- Incumbent
- Assumed office 30 November 2016

Personal details
- Born: 21 October 1969 (age 57)

Omar Sial (born 21 October 1969) is a Pakistani jurist who has been a Justice of the Sindh High Court since 30 November 2016.

== Early life and education ==
Sial completed his early education at Karachi Grammar School. He obtained a Bachelor of Laws (LL.B.) degree from S.M. Law College, Karachi, and later pursued a Master of Laws (LL.M.) degree at the University of Cambridge in England. He is a Lady Noon Scholar and a Fellow of the Cambridge Commonwealth Trust. Sial is the Pakistan Representative for Trinity Hall, University of Cambridge, and is part of the research team at the Hauser Global Law School Program, New York University School of Law.

== Career ==
Sial began his legal career in March 1999 as an advocate in the District Courts of Sindh. He was admitted to practice before the High Courts of Pakistan in March 2001. Alongside his private legal practice, he was appointed as a Special Prosecutor for the Anti-Narcotics Force in 2014 and served in that role until his elevation to the bench on 30 November 2016 as an Additional Judge of the Sindh High Court. He was confirmed as a permanent judge on 27 November 2017.

He has also served as the Monitoring Judge of the Anti-Terrorism Courts of Sindh and represented the Sindh High Court on the Syndicates of Shaheed Mohtarma Benazir Bhutto University of Medicine in Larkana and the University of Sufism and Modern Sciences in Bhit Shah. Currently, he is a member of the Syndicates of the University of Sindh and the Dadabhoy Institute of Education.
