= Amanullah Abbasi =

Judge on the High Court of Sindh (1935–2013)

Honourable Justice Amanullah Abbasi
- امان اللہ عباسی

Judge Sindh High Court
- In office 10 April 1995 – 4 April 2000 (retired)

Personal details
- Born: 4 April 1935
- Died: 15 August 2013 (aged 78) Karachi, Pakistan

Amanullah Abbasi (Urdu: امان اللہ عباسی; 4 April 1935 – 15 August 2013) was a Pakistani jurist who served as a judge of the Sindh High Court and chairman of the Federal Service Tribunal, Islamabad.

Legal offices	Judge of the Sindh High Court; 1995–2000
