= Maqbool Baqar =

Pakistani jurist and former caretaker chief minister of Sindh

- مقبول باقر

Chief Minister of Sindh
- Caretaker
- In office 17 August 2023 – 27 February 2024
- Governor: Kamran Tessori
- Preceded by: Syed Murad Ali Shah
- Succeeded by: Syed Murad Ali Shah

Justice of the Supreme Court of Pakistan
- In office 17 February 2015 – 4 April 2022

Chief Justice of the Sindh High Court
- In office 20 September 2013 – 17 February 2015
- Preceded by: Mushir Alam
- Succeeded by: Faisal Arab

Justice of the Sindh High Court
- In office 26 August 2002 – 17 February 2015

Personal details
- Born: 5 April 1957 (age 69) Karachi, Sindh, Pakistan
- Education: University of Karachi

Maqbool Baqar (Urdu: مقبول باقر) is a Pakistani jurist who has served as the Chief Justice of the Sindh High Court and as a justice of the Supreme Court of Pakistan. He is a former Caretaker Chief Minister of Sindh, serving in this position from 17 August 2023 till 27 February 2024.

== Early life and education ==
He was born on 5 April 1957 in Karachi, Sindh, Pakistan. He finished his LLB from the University of Karachi in 1979.

== Judicial career ==
He began his judicial career as an advocate in the Sindh High Court (SHC) in May 1981. He was elevated as an Additional Justice of the SHC on 26 August 2002 and was confirmed as a Justice of the SHC on 26 August 2003. He was appointed as the Chief Justice of the SHC on 20 September 2013 after the retirement of the previous Chief Justice, Mushir Alam. Due to his judgements in terrorism cases, Baqar was targeted by Lashkar-e-Jhangvi, a banned terrorist group, in a bomb explosion on 26 June 2013. Due to injuries suffered in the attack, he had to go through months of rehabilitative surgery. He was elevated to the Supreme Court of Pakistan on 17 February 2015.

In the Supreme Court, Baqar wrote many important judgements. One of these judgements was the one for the case of Asif Ali Zardari vs. National Accountability Bureau (NAB), which held that NAB had exceeded its powers in its investigation of former President of Pakistan Asif Ali Zardari. He also wrote the dissenting note in the case of Qazi Faez Isa vs. Federation of Pakistan, where he held that the presidential reference against Justice Qazi Faez Isa was politically motivated.

He retired from the Supreme Court on 4 April 2022 and became a visiting professor at the University of Karachi.

On 19 July 2024, his name was to be considered by the Judicial Commission of Pakistan for an appointment as an ad-hoc judge of the Supreme Court. However, on 18 July, he formally refused the offer, citing personal and domestic reasons.

== Later career ==
On 14 August 2023, Murad Ali Shah, the outgoing Chief Minister of Sindh, and Rana Ansar, the outgoing Leader of the Opposition, both agreed to propose Baqar's name for the position of Caretaker Chief Minister of Sindh. He took oath on 17 August 2023.
