= Zafar Ahmed Rajput =

Chief Justice of the Sindh High Court

- ظفر احمد راجپوت

Chief Justice of the Sindh High Court
- Incumbent
- Assumed office 6 December 2025
- Preceded by: Mohammad Junaid Ghaffar

Acting Chief Justice of the Sindh High Court
- In office 15 September 2025 – 6 December 2025

Justice of the Sindh High Court
- Incumbent
- Assumed office 31 August 2013

Personal details
- Born: 16 October 1965 (age 61) Hyderabad, Pakistan
- Education: Government City Arts College Hyderabad; Government Jinnah Law College Hyderabad; University of Sindh

Zafar Ahmed Rajput (Urdu: ظفر احمد راجپوت, born 16 October 1965) is a Pakistani jurist serving as the Chief Justice of the Sindh High Court (SHC) since 6 December 2025. He previously served as acting chief justice of the SHC from 15 September 2025 and has been a judge of the court since 31 August 2013.

== Early life and education ==
Rajput was born on 16 October 1965 in Hyderabad, Pakistan. He received a Bachelor of Arts degree from Government City Arts College, Hyderabad, an LL.B from Government Jinnah Law College, Hyderabad, and a master's degree in international relations from the University of Sindh. He also completed a one-year course in Islamic laws from the Shariah Academy of the International Islamic University, Islamabad.

== Legal career ==
Rajput was enrolled with the Sindh Bar Council as an advocate in 1990. He joined the judicial service as a judicial magistrate in 1993 and was promoted to senior civil judge and assistant sessions judge in 2000. During this period, he attended training courses at the Sindh Judicial Academy, Karachi, and the Federal Judicial Academy, Islamabad. He left the judicial service in 2001 and became an advocate of the high court.

He also taught law at Sindh Law College, Hyderabad, for 12 years as a lecturer and assistant professor. As an advocate, Rajput served as a legal adviser to the Catholic Diocese of Pakistan and the Church of Pakistan, Diocese of Hyderabad, and as panel advocate for various financial institutions and municipal administrations. He was also campaign coordinator for Amnesty International's Hyderabad chapter and participated in human rights conferences in Pakistan and abroad. In 2013, he was elected president of the District Bar Association Hyderabad.

== Judicial career ==
Rajput was elevated as a judge of the Sindh High Court on 31 August 2013. He has served at the SHC's principal seat in Karachi, as well as at benches in Sukkur and circuit courts in Hyderabad and Larkana. He has handled cases across multiple areas of law, including property, intellectual property, rent, family, arbitration, banking and criminal law, with a noted interest in human rights and civil liberties. He also served as monitoring judge for several judicial districts, including Matiari, Hyderabad, Shikarpur and Karachi-South. In December 2023, he represented the Sindh High Court at a seminar for judges from Shanghai Cooperation Organization member countries in Beijing, China.

He became the acting chief justice of the Sindh High Court on 15 September 2025. He was sworn in as the permanent chief justice on 6 December 2025 after approval by the Judicial Commission of Pakistan.
