= Tanveer Abbasi =

Sindhi-language poet

- تنوير عباسي
- Born: Noor Nabi Abbasi; 7 December 1934; Sobhodero, Sindh, British India
- Died: 25 November 1999 (aged 64); Islamabad, Pakistan
- Occupations: Writer, poet
- Spouse: Dr Qamar Abbasi
- Writing career
- Notable work: شعر رڳون ٿيون رباب شاه لطيف جي شاعري جديد سنڌي شاعري سج تريءَ هيٺان خير محمد هيسباڻيءَ جو ڪلام نانڪ يوسف جو ڪلام ڏوري ڏوري ڏيهه هيءَ ڌرتي ساجن سونهن سرت
- Literary movement: Progressive

Tanveer Abbasi (Sindhi: ڊاڪٽر تنوير عباسي) was a Sindhi-language poet from Pakistan.

== Bibliography ==
His notable poetry collections, travelogues, biographical sketches, and literary research include:

- رڳون ٿيون رباب (شاعري) 1958ع
- شعر (شاعري) 1978 ع
- جي ماريا نه موت ( ويٽ نامي ناول جو ترجمو) 1973ع
- ٻاراڻا ٻول ( چونڊ ۽ ترتيب: 1973ع )
- شاه لطيف جي شاعري ( تحقيق: جلد I 1976ع )
- شاهه لطيف جي شاعري ( جلد ٻيو ، 1985ع )
- شاهه لطيف جي شاعري ( 3 جلد گڏ ، 1989ع )
- سج تريءَ هيٺان ( شاعري: 1977ع )
- جديد سنڌي شاعري ( چونڊ ۽ ترتيب: 1981ع )
- خير محمد هيسباڻيءَ جو ڪلام ( ترتيب: 1983ع )
- نانڪ يوسف جو ڪلام ( ترتيب: 1982ع )
- ڏوري ڏوري ڏيهه ( سفرنامو: 1984ع )
- هيءَ ڌرتي ( شاعري: 1985ع )
- Sachal Sarmast
- منهن تنين مشعل ( خاڪا: 1990ع )
- تنوير چئي ( شعري ڪليات:1989ع )
- ترورا ( ادبي مضمون ، خاڪا ، يادگيريون ، سفرنامو: 1988ع )
- ساجن سونهن سرت ( شاعري: 1996ع )
- سپني کان سهڻي ساڀيا ( تقريرون ۽ ليڪچر: 2002ع )
- سچل جو رسالو ( ترتيب:اڻ ڇپيل )
- مون کي اڳتي وڃڻو آهي ( سفرناما: 2000ع ) .
