= Agha Faisal =

Justice of the Sindh High Court

Justice of the Sindh High Court
- Incumbent
- Assumed office 6 February 2018

Personal details
- Born: 8 November 1972 (age 54)
- Education: Miami University; University of Buckingham

Agha Faisal is a judge of the Sindh High Court in Pakistan.

He was born in Karachi on 8th November 1972. He has a B.Sc. Finance from Miami University, LLB (Hons) from University of Buckingham and was called to the Bar of England and Wales by Lincoln’s Inn. He was licensed as an advocate in 1998; certified to appear before the High Courts in 2000; and signed the roll at the Supreme Court in 2012. He remained honorary lecturer at S. M. Law College Karachi and occasionally penned articles for national newspapers.

On 6th February 2018, he was sworn in as a Justice of the High Court of Sindh. He has also served as the sole Senate Tribunal Sindh for the 2021 Senate Elections; Chairman of the Sindh Subordinate Judiciary Service Tribunal; Chairman of the High Court Establishment Service Tribunal; Company Judge (per the Companies Act 2017); and Judge Special Appellate Court (Prevention of Smuggling Act 1977) for Sindh. In over eight years, since appointment, he has decided more than 32,000 cases.

The National Judicial (Policy Making) Committee, chaired by the Chief Justice of Pakistan, appointed him to its Fiscal Reforms Committee; constituted to address the issue of protracted litigation and injunctive orders in cases of commercial, revenue and fiscal nature. The Chief Justice of Sindh nominated him to represent the High Court in the Law & Justice Commission of Pakistan’s Consultative Meeting on Tax Litigation Framework; convened to improve dispensation of justice in high impact fiscal matters. He has chaired the High Court’s committee for Library, Museum and Archives; served on the High Court’s Selection Board for Officers – Grade 16 and above, Selection Committee for Promotion - Grade 16 and above and on the committees for Finance, Development, Building Maintenance and Horticulture.

The Chief Justice of Sindh had designated him as the Commission of Inquiry, constituted by the Government of Sindh, to probe the devastating inferno at Gul Plaza, that destroyed the shopping mall in the commercial heart of Karachi and led to the tragic loss of at least 72 lives. The commission concluded its inquiry within the prescribed eight-week timeframe and submitted its sealed report to the Government of Sindh in April 2026. The report was made public by the authorities about five months later.

Since 2018, he has remained the monitoring and inspecting Judge for District Naushahro Feroze. In 2019, he seeded and supervised the creation of a law library at Moro. In 2025, he precipitated an inter-institutional consensus for construction of a state of the art, digitally integrated, environmentally oriented and off-grid renewable energy sufficient judicial complex at Moro. The project is conceived to employ design and technology to accelerate adjudication, while manifesting the historical, cultural and architectural legacy of Sindh.

He has served on the Board of Trustees of the Aga Khan University; syndicates of the University of Karachi, SZAB University of Law Karachi, Dow University of Health Sciences Karachi and BBS University Khairpur; remained a member of the board of governors of the law colleges of Karachi, Salim Habib University, S. M. Law College, Habib University and Ziauddin University; and lectured at the Sindh Judicial Academy. He was the High Court’s delegate to the US Pakistan consultations on digital economy issues held in Washington DC.

In 2024, Faisal was nominated by the Judicial Commission of Pakistan as a judge to the constitutional benches of the Sindh High Court. His appointment was approved by a majority vote.
