= Faisal Arab =

Pakistani judge (born 1955)

Justice of the Supreme Court of Pakistan
- In office 13 December 2015 – 4 November 2020
- Nominated by: Mamnoon Hussain

Chief Justice of the Sindh High Court
- In office 17 February 2015 – 13 December 2015
- Nominated by: Mamnoon Hussain
- Preceded by: Maqbool Baqar
- Succeeded by: Sajjad Ali Shah

Justice of the Sindh High Court
- In office 25 October 2006 – 17 February 2015
- Nominated by: Pervez Musharraf

Personal details
- Born: 5 November 1955 (age 71) Sindh

Faisal Arab (Urdu: فيصل عرب) is a Pakistani jurist who served as justice of the Supreme Court of Pakistan, from 13 December 2015 to 4 November 2020.

He was formerly the Chief Justice of Sindh High Court from 17 February 2015 until his appointment to the Supreme Court. He also headed a special three-member court to hear the high treason case against former military ruler General Pervez Musharraf in November 2013.

He was among those judges who refused to take the oath as a PCO judge in 2007. Justice Arab has been described, by legal observers, as liberal in his jurisprudence and took a moderate stance on the judicial interpretation when rendering judgements in many important cases.

== Early life and education ==
Born on November 5, 1955, Justice Arab graduated in commerce in 1978 from the Government College of Commerce & Economics, Karachi, and completed his LLB in 1989 from Sindh Muslim Law College. He was enrolled as an advocate of the high court in 1992 and in the Supreme Court in 2005.

== Professional and Judicial Career ==
As a lawyer, he first interned at Fakhruddin G. Ebrahim & Company in 1990. Then he worked in his law firm in the name of Faisal Arab & Associates from 2000 to 2005. Mr.Arab was appointed additional judge of the Sindh High Court in October 2005 and a permanent judge of the Sindh High Court on October 25, 2006. However he, along with other judges, was deposed when General Pervez Musharraf declared a state of emergency in the country and promulgated his infamous November 3, 2007 Provisional Constitutional Order. Justice Arab was among those judges who refused to take the oath as a PCO judge in 2007. Among legal circles, Justice Arab is known for his quick disposal of cases.

Justice Arab was appointed head of a special three-member court to hear the high treason case against former military ruler Gen Pervez Musharraf in November 2013. He conducted the proceedings in a very fair manner and without any bias," says Barrister Farogh Naseem (counsel for the accused), referring to the fact that his client had imposed a state of emergency that led to the removal of several judges, including Justice Arab. He was appointed as Chief Justice of Sindh High Court on 17 February 2015.

== See also ==
- Sindh High Court

Legal offices
Preceded by Maqbool Baqar	Chief Justice of Sindh High Court; February 17, 2015 – December 13, 2015	Succeeded by Sajjad Ali Shah
