= Mustafa Abbasi =

Arab Israeli historian

- مصطفى العباسي
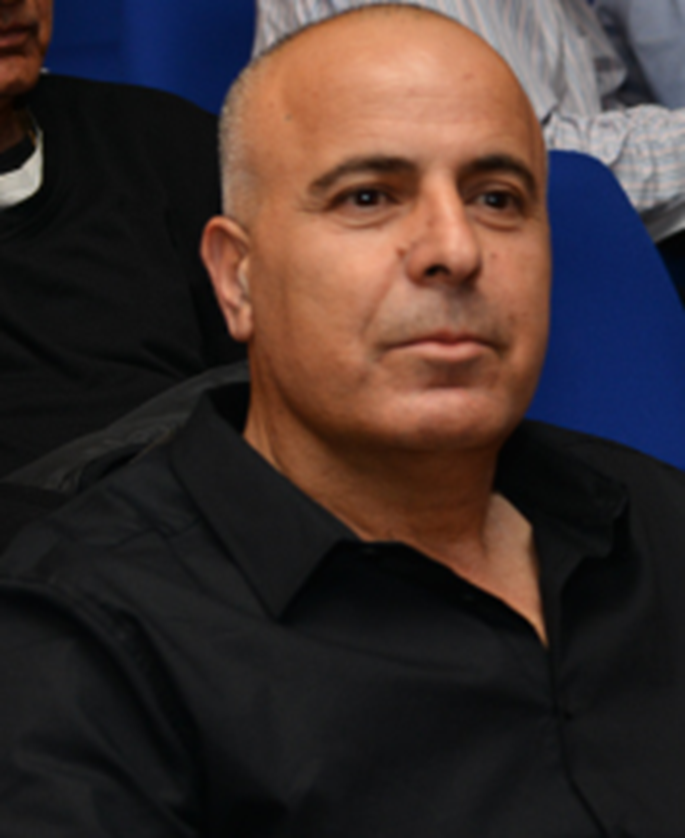
- Born: 1962 (age 63–64); Jish, Upper Galilee, Israel
- Occupation: Historian

Academic work
- Discipline: Historian of Palestine
- Sub-discipline: 19th and 20th-century Palestinian society
- Institutions: Tel-Hai Academic College

Mustafa Abbasi (Arabic: مصطفى العباسي; born 1962) is an Arab Israeli historian and full professor specializing in the history of Palestinian society, Arab towns in the Galilee, and Arab communities in Israel. He focuses on the social and urban history of northern Palestine, particularly during the Late Ottoman and British Mandate periods. His scholarship incorporates archival sources and urban sociology.

== Academic career ==
Abbasi was born in the Galilean village of Jish and earned his Ph.D. in Middle Eastern History from the University of Haifa in 2000. He also holds M.A. and B.A. degrees in Middle Eastern history and geography. Since 2000, he has taught at Tel-Hai Academic College, where he was promoted to full professor and served as Chair of the Department of Multidisciplinary Studies and Dean of Students. He has also taught at Kinneret Academic College and the University of Haifa.

His work includes studies on Safed, Nazareth, Tiberias, Samakh, Beisan, and Jish, as well as broader analyses of political, religious, and social dynamics in Galilee.

== Selected publications ==
=== Books ===
- Abbasi, M. (2021). Tiberias and its Arab residents during the British Mandate 1918–1948. Yad Izhak Ben-Zvi. (Hebrew)
- Abbasi, M. (2015). Arabs and Jews in a Mixed City: Safed during the Mandate Period 1918–1948. Yad Izhak Ben-Zvi. (Hebrew)
- Abbasi, M. (2014). The Cities of Galilee during the War of 1948: Four Cities and Four Stories. LAP Lambert Academic Publishing.
- Abbasi, M. (2005). Safed in the Mandate Period: Social and Political Aspects. Institute for Palestinian Studies. (Arabic)
- Abbasi, M. (1991). History of the Touqan Family in the District of Nablus in the 18th and 19th Centuries. Al-Mashreq. (Arabic)

=== Edited volumes ===
- Abbasi, M. et al. (2024). Galilee Studies Vol. 4: A Tribute to Haim Goren. Tel-Hai College.
- Abbasi, M. et al. (2018). Living in Mandatory Palestine: Personal Narratives of Resilience of Galilee during the Mandate Period. Routledge.
- Abbasi, M. et al. (2009–2018). New Studies of the Galilee (Vols. 1–3). Tel-Hai College.

== See also ==
- 1948 Palestinian exodus
