= Armita Abbasi =

Iranian protester sexually assaulted and detained

- آرمیتا عباسی
- Born: 2001 (age 24–25); Rasht, Iran
- Known for: Enforced disappearance by Islamic Republic of Iran

Armita Abbasi (Persian: آرمیتا عباسی; born 2001) is an Iranian protester, who was arrested on October 10, 2022, in Karaj, Iran by the Islamic Republic of Iran's forces amid Iran's nationwide protests. A week after her arrest, she experienced a serious medical condition that was reported by the hospital medical staff and by American newspaper CNN as multiple sexual assaults, this was later disputed by the Iranian government and Iranian newspapers, which reported the medical condition as intestinal issues. Abbasi was allegedly abducted by government security forces from the hospital. Her case has received attention from the international media, and has brought attention to sexual violence and repression in Iranian prisons. As of February 2023, she was released from prison.

== History ==
Armita Abbasi had openly criticized Iranian government on social media networks during the Mahsa Amini protests. She was arrested on October 10, 2022, in Karaj, Iran. The Abbasi family said that their daughter had been missing for eight days while in custody. After a week of physical and psychological torture, including repeated sexual assault at the hands of the Iranian government forces, she was taken on October 18 to the Imam Ali Hospital in Karaj. Her parents rushed to visit her in the hospital but missed her, but she was allegedly abducted by security forces and transferred to an unknown location.

In the hospital, clinical evidence of multiple, violent sexual assaults were observed and recorded. It was also reported that security forces had shaved the hair off of her head while she was in the hospital. In November 2022, CNN confirmed in an investigative report her repeated sexual assault. Cases of systematic rape in Iranian prisons, and sexual violence by Iranian security forces have been documented for many years, however the Abbasi case is one of the few that has brought international news and attention to this issue.

The security forces accompanying her to the hospital insisted that it be written in her medical certificate that the assaults occurred before Abbasi's arrest. The Chief of Justice of Alborz province denied the assault report of Abbasi. Her family reported that they received a phone call from security forces telling them if they ever wanted to see their daughter again, they would need to participate in an interview on television and say that they had taken their daughter to hospital due to "bloody diarrhea". Her family disagreed. According to Nasim News, the public was concerned that Abbasi may have been executed, and the Alborz Chief of Justice confirmed her arrest and announced that she was sent to the hospital due to intestinal problems and "bloody diarrhea", and after twenty-four hours, she was sent to Fardis prison again. On October 29, the Iranian government declared Abbasi was “the leader of the riots” and that “10 Molotov cocktails” were discovered in her apartment. The Iranian newspaper Jam-e Jam called into question the creditability of CNN's investigative reporting in December 2022, alleging it was questionable and "too vague", as well as supporting the claim of the Iranian government that she was experiencing intestinal issues.

Abbasi has been reported to be on a hunger strike in prison as of December 2022. In February 2023, after more than 100 days of detention, Abbasi was released from prison and rejoined her family.

== Impact ==
In November 2022, she was one of the primary subjects of a CNN news investigative report about Iranian prisoners and sexual assault, and was named as one of the eleven confirmed cases of assault. Ned Price, the spokesperson of the United States Department of State, responded publicly to the CNN report with a call to swift action by the United Nations.

In photos on social media Abbasi often wore a Star of David necklace, a Jewish cultural and religious symbol, which has drawn attention to her by the International Jewish community (even though she is not Jewish).

In Iranian exile and diaspora communities such as in Germany, Abbasi has been represented in local protests. German politician, Carmen Wegge publicly campaigned for Abbasi's release. In October 2024, after a three-month escape, Abbasi reached Munich with the assistance and Help of the German organization The Munich Circle e.V. and has been living safely since then.

== See also ==
- Death of Mahsa Amini
- Iranian protests against compulsory hijab
