= Sindh High Court =

Apex court of the Pakistani province of Sindh

High Court of Sindh سنڌ ھائي ڪورٽ (Sindhi) عدالتِ عالیہ سندھ (Urdu)

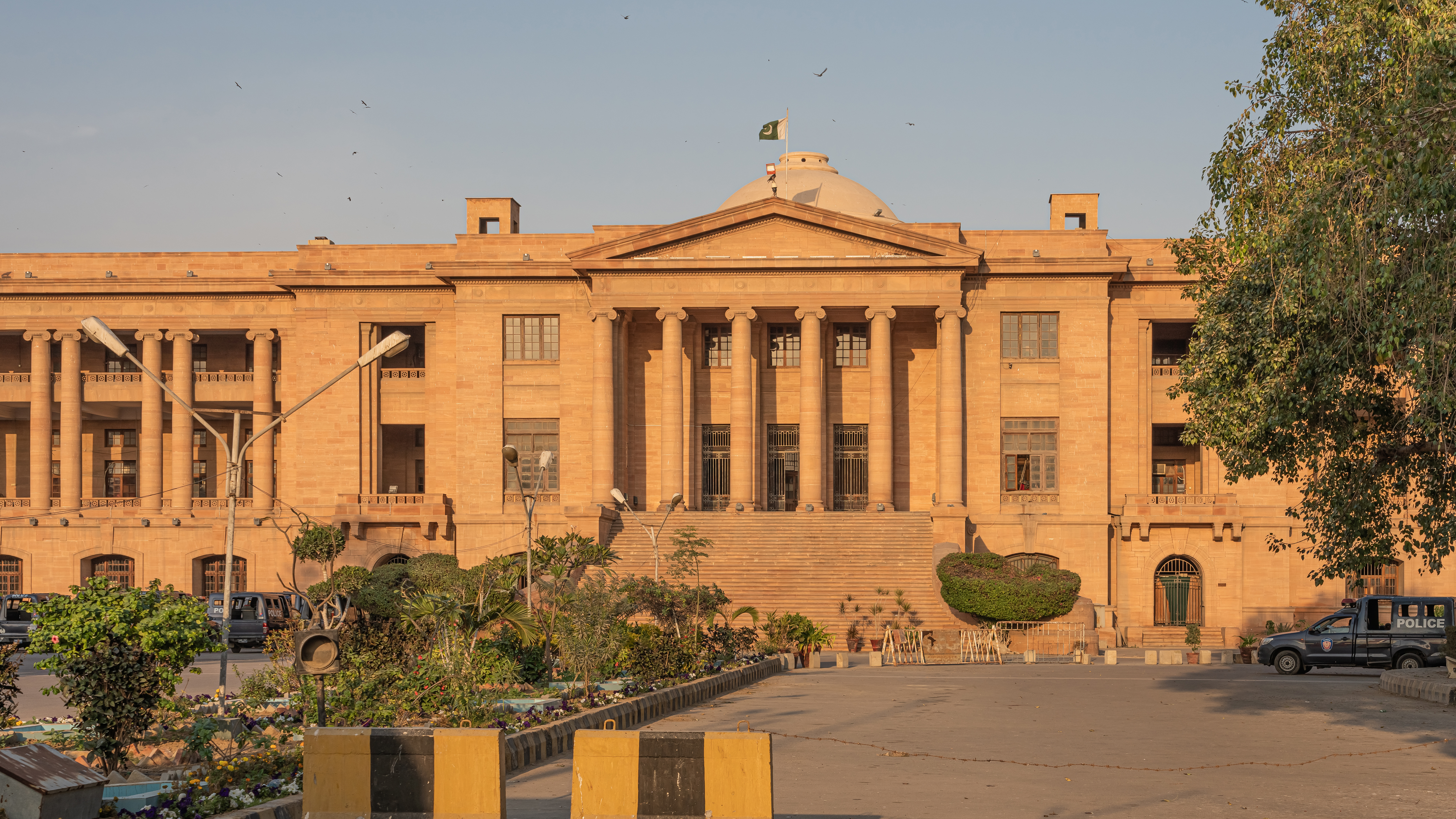
- Sindh High Court building in Karachi
- Interactive map of High Court of Sindh سنڌ ھائي ڪورٽ (Sindhi) عدالتِ عالیہ سندھ (Urdu)
- Established: 1906; 120 years ago
- Jurisdiction: Sindh
- Location: Principal seat: Karachi; Circuit benches: Hyderabad; Sukkur; Larkana; Mirpur Khas
- Composition method: Judicial Commission of Pakistan
- Authorised by: Constitution of Pakistan
- Appeals to: Supreme Court of Pakistan
- Appeals from: District Courts
- Judge term length: Until 62 years of age
- Number of positions: 40
- Website: www.sindhhighcourt.gov.pk

Chief Justice of Sindh
- Currently: Zafar Ahmed Rajput
- Since: 6 December 2025
- Lead position ends: 15 October 2027

The High Court of Sindh (Note: Sindhi: سنڌ ھائي ڪورٽ, romanized: sindh hā'ī kōrṭ; Urdu: عدالتِ عالیہ سندھ, romanized: 'adālat-ē-'ālīyā sindh) is the highest court in the provincial judiciary of the Pakistani province of Sindh. It has supreme appellate jurisdiction over all provincial cases in Sindh. Established in 1906, the court's primary seat is based in the provincial capital of Karachi, with secondary benches in Hyderabad, Sukkur, Larkana, and Mirpur Khas. Apart from being the highest court of appeal for Sindh in civil and criminal matters, the court was the District Court and the Court of Session in Karachi.

== History ==
On 21 August 1926, the Sindh Courts Act (Bom. VII of 1926) was passed into law, making provision for the establishment of a chief court for the province of Sindh. On the coming into operation of Part III of the Government of India Act, 1935, on 1 April 1937, Sindh became a separate province and the judges of the Court of Judicial Commissioner of Sindh were appointed by Royal Warrant by the British Government.

At the time of establishment of the High Court of West Pakistan the number of the judges of the Karachi Bench was almost the same, but subsequently it was increased to 15. On the separation of the Sindh & Balochistan's High Court, 12 judges were allocated to the Sindh High Court and 3 judges to the Balochistan High Court. The present approved strength of judges is 28. However, the number of judges appointed is 24.

== Building complex ==
The construction of existing main building was commenced in 1923, at an estimated cost of Rs. 39,75,248 but it was completed on 22-11-1929, at actual cost of Rs. 30,35,000. This building which was meant for 5 judges with some provision for expansion in 1929 is now accommodating 18 judges. Some judges have to hold court in chambers. It also provides space for the offices of the Attorney-General, Deputy Attorney-General, Federal Shariat Court of Pakistan Registry, Advocate-General, Sindh, Additional Advocate General, Sindh, Assistant Advocate General, Sindh and High Court Bar Library. Before the Supreme Court Registry was shifted from the High Court premises, two court rooms and three chambers were used by Supreme Court judges. When the Supreme Court comes to Karachi in bigger strength some more chambers were provided to the Judges of the Supreme Court.

In 1974, an annex building on the northeast side of the compound of the High Court was constructed at a cost of Rs. 4.4 million. However, it did not substantially ease the crowding situation, because it also provides office space for the Secretary, Ministry of Justice and Parliamentary Affairs, Standing Counsel, Official Assignee, Special Banking Court, Registry of the Federal Shariat Court and Sindh Bar Council, in addition to High Court facilities.

The provincial government has allocated a token amount of Rs. One Lac during the current year for construction of Annexe Building of South-East of the present building in order to make the scheme as ongoing scheme. The building was estimated in 1984 to cost a sum of Rs. 13.35 million. The cost now may go up slightly because of inflation. Unless the Federal Government provides funds or the Provincial Government give preference to the construction of this building and provide necessary funds, the building is not going to be completed within a year or two.

== Bench ==
The High Court of Sindh consists of a Chief Justice and 27 other judges. A judge of the High Court is appointed by the President after consultation with the Chief Justice of Pakistan, the Governor of the Province and the Chief Justice of the High Court. No person can be appointed as a judge of a High Court unless he is a citizen of Pakistan at least forty years of age and has been an advocate of the High Court or has held a judicial office for ten years and has for a period of not less than three years served as or exercised the functions of a district judge in Pakistan. A judge of a High Court holds office until he attains the age of sixty-two years, unless he resigns before then or is removed from office in accordance with the Constitution.

The principal seat of the High Court of Sindh is at Karachi with benches at Hyderabad, Sukkur, Larkana, and Mirpurkhas. The High Court may have more benches at other places as the Governor on the advice of the Cabinet and in consultation with the Chief Justice of the High Court may determine.

== PC0 25 March 1981 ==
- Agha Ali Hyder-not offered oath under PCO as chief justice of Sindh High Court; took oath under PCO as judge of Federal Shariat Court
- Abdul Hayee Qureshi took oath under PCO
- Abdul Hafeez Memon did not take oath under PCO
- Zaffar Hussain Mirza took oath under PCO
- Naimuddin Ahmed took oath under PCO
- S.A. Nusrat took oath under PCO
- G. M. Shah did not take oath under PCO
- Ajmal Mian took fresh oath as new judge under PCO
- Muhammad Zahoor-ul-Haq took fresh oath as new judge under PCO
- Sajjad Ali Shah took fresh oath as new judge under PCO
- Ghous Ali Shah took oath under PCO
- Dr. Tanzil-ur-Rehman took fresh oath as new judge under PCO
- Saeed-uz-Zaman Siddiqui took fresh oath as new judge under PCO
- Ghulam Muhammad Kourejo took oath under PCO
- Nasir Aslam Zahid took fresh oath as new judge under PCO
- K. A. Ghani took oath under PCO
- Saleem Akhtar took fresh oath as new judge under PCO

== PC0 26 January 2000 ==
- Nazim Hussain Siddiqi take oath under PCO was chief justice
- Iftikhar Muhammad Chaudhary take oath under PCO
- Ghous Mohammed Not invited to take oath/ cease to hold office
- Mushtaq Memon Not invited to take oath/ cease to hold office
- Rasheed Rizvi Not invited to take oath/ cease to hold office
- Syed Deedar Hussain take oath under PCO
- Amanullah Abbasi take oath under PCO
- Hamid Ali Mirza take oath under PCO
- Hameed Dogar take oath under PCO
- Syed Saeed Ashad take oath under PCO
- Abdul Ghani Shaikh take oath under PCO
- Mohammed Roshan Esani take oath under PCO
- S. A. Sarwar take oath under PCO
- Zahid Qurban Alvi, take oath under PCO
- Shabir Ahmed take oath under PCO
- Ata-ur-Rehman take oath under PCO
- Ghulam Rabban take oath under PCO
- Sarmad Jalal Usmani take oath under PCO
- Anwar Zaheer Jamali take oath under PCO
- S. A. Rabbani take oath under PCO
- M. Ashraf Leghari take oath under PCO
- Wahid Bux Brohi take oath under PCO
- Sabihuddin Ahmed take oath under PCO
- Rana Bhagwandas take oath under PCO
- Ghulam Nabi Soomro take oath under PCO
- Mushir Alam take oath under PCO

== PC0 3 November 2007 ==
- Sabihuddin Ahmed – Did not take oath under PCO was chief justice
- Sarmad Jalal Usmani -Did not take oath under PCO
- Anwar Zaheer Jamali -Did not take oath under PCO
- Musheer Alam -Did not take oath under PCO
- Mohammad Moosa K. Legari -take oath under Pco elevated to supreme court
- Zia Perwez – take oath under Pco elevated to supreme court
- Afzal Soomro -take oath under PCO became chief justice
- Rahmad Hussain Jaferi -Did not take oath under PCO
- Azizullah Memon -take oath under PCO
- Khilji Arif Hussain -Did not take oath under PCO
- Ameer Hani Muslim -Did not take oath under PCO
- Gulzar Ahmad -Did not take oath under PCO
- Maqbool Baqar -Did not take oath under PCO
- Munib Ahmad Khan -take oath under PCO
- Muhammad Athar Saeed -Did not take oath under PCO
- Yasmin Abbasey -take oath under PCO
- Mrs Qaiser Iqbal -take oath under PCO
- Ali Sain Dino Metlo-take oath under PCO
- Faisal Arab – Did not take oath under PCO
- Sajjad Ali Shah -Did not take oath under PCO
- Nadeem Azhar Siddiqui – take oath under PCO was additional judge
- Abdul Rasheed Kalwar – Did not take oath under PCO was additional judge
- Salman Ansari – Did not take oath under PCO was additional judge
- Arshad Siraj Memon – Did not take oath under PCO was additional judge
- Zafar Ahmad Khan Sherwani – Did not take oath under PCO was additional judge
- Mahmood Alam Rizvi – take oath under PCO was additional judge
- Abdul Rahman Farooq Pirzada – take oath under PCO was additional judge
- Additional Judges Appointed under PCO
- Khawaja Naveed Ahmed
- Qazi Khalid
- Rana Shamim
- Agha Rafiq Ahmed Khan
- Syed Pir Ali Shah
- Bin Yamin
- Arshad Noor
- Dr Qamaruddin Bohra
- Ghulam Dastagir Shahani
- Farrukh Zia Sheikh
- Abdul Qadir Khan

== Reappointment of judges ==
- After the resignation of Pervez Musharraf as president in 2008, the Pakistan People's Party led government decided to reappoint judges under the 1973 constitution and administer fresh oath of office. Some of the judges agreed to take fresh oaths and were reappointed.

27 August 2008 and 6 September 2008

- Reappointed in August 2008
- Anwar Zaheer Jamali – made chief justice
- Khilji Arif Hussain
- Ameer Hani Muslim
- Faisal Arab
- Sajjad Ali Shah
- Abdul Rasheed Kalwar
- Salman Ansari
- Zafar Ahmad Khan Sherwani
- Reappointed on 6 September 2008
- Sabihuddin Ahmed, elevated to Supreme Court
- Sarmad Jalal Usmani, elevated to Supreme Court
- Gulzar Ahmad
- Muhammad Athar Saeed
- Reappointed in December 2008
- Agha Rafiq Ahmed Khan with original seniority- posted as Federal Secretary Law and Justice

== Restoration of judges ==
After protests by lawyers and opposition parties, on 16 March 2009, the Government restored deposed judges. Only two judges had refused to be reappointed: Musheer Alam and Maqbool Baqar.

== Former Chief Justices ==
- Mr. Justice Abdul Kadir Shaikh (01-12-1976 to 30-06-1979)
- Mr. Justice Ahga Ali Hyder (01-07-1979 to 24-03-1981)
- Mr. Justice Abdul Hayee Qureshi (25-03-1981 to 19-01-1986)
- Mr. Justice Naimuddin Ahmed (21-01-1986 to 03-09-1988)
- Mr. Justice Ajmal Mian (04-09-1988 to 12-12-1989)
- Mr. Justice Syed Sajjad Ali Shah (13-12-1989 to 04-11-1990)
- Mr. Justice Saeed-uz-Zaman Siddiqui (05-11-1990 to 21-05-1992)
- Mr. Justice Nasir Aslam Zahid (23-05-1992 to 15-04-1994)
- Mr. Justice Abdul Hafeez Memon (Acting Chief Justice)(16-04-1994 to 14-04-1996)
- Mr. Justice Mamoon Kazi (15-04-1996 to 04-11-1997)
- Mr. Justice Wajihuddin Ahmed (05-11-1997 to 04-05-1998)
- Mr. Justice Kamal Mansur Alam (05-05-1998 to 21-04-1999)
- Mr. Justice Nazim Hussain Siddiqui (22-04-1999 to 03-02-2000)
- Mr. Justice Syed Deedar Hussain Shah (04-02-2000 to 27-04-2000)
- Mr. Justice Saiyed Saeed Ashhad (28-04-2000 to 04-04-2005)
- Mr. Justice Sabihuddin Ahmed (05-04-2005 to 03-11-2007)
- Mr. Justice Afzal Soomro (03-11-2007 to 15-05-2008)
- Mr. Justice Azizullah M. Memon (Acting Chief Justice)(15-05-2008 to 27-08-2008)
- Mr. Justice Anwar Zaheer Jamali (28-08-2008 to 02-08-2009)
- Mr. Justice Sarmad Jalal Osmany (03-08-2009 to 13-02-2011)
- Mr. Justice Mushir Alam (14-02-2011 to 19-09-2013)
- Mr. Justice Maqbool Baqar (20-09-2013 to 16-02-2015)
- Mr. Justice Faisal Arab (17-02-2015 to 13-12-2015)
- Mr. Justice Sajjad Ali Shah (14-12-2015) to (14-03-2017)
- Mr. Justice Ahmed Ali Sheikh (15-03-2017 to 02-10-2023)
- Mr. Justice Irfan Saadat Khan (Acting) (3-10-2023 to 02-11-2023)
- Mr. Justice Aqeel Ahmed Abbasi (Acting) (03-11-2023 to 18-12-2023)
- Mr. Justice Muhammad Shafi Siddiqui(Acting) (25-06-2024 to 12-07-2024)

== Judges of Sindh High Court ==
The High Court of Sindh is headed by a Chief Justice. The bench consist of justices and additional judges and the retirement age of the Chief Justice and justices is 62 years. The additional judges are initially appointed for one year, and after that their services could either be extended, or they could be confirmed. The current Chief Justice of Sindh High Court is Zafar Ahmed Rajput.

=== Current composition ===
No.	Name	Date of appointment	Date of mandatory retirement	Note(s)
1	Zafar Ahmed Rajput	31 August 2013	15 October 2027	Chief Justice since 14 September 2025
2	Muhammad Iqbal Kalhoro	30 May 2014	18 July 2030	Senior Puisne Judge since 14 September 2025
3	Muhammad Faisal Kamal Alam	30 October 2015	7 May 2031	
4	Arshad Hussain Khan	29 June 2016	4 February 2029	
5	Muhammad Saleem Jessar	29 June 2016	11 September 2029	
6	Omar Sial	30 November 2016	20 October 2031	
7	Adnanul Karim Memon	30 November 2016	7 January 2033	
8	Yousuf Ali Sayeed	30 November 2016	18 August 2033	
9	Shamsuddin Abbasi	6 February 2018	24 October 2028	
10	Amjad Ali Sahito	6 February 2018	2 May 2029	
11	Adnan Iqbal Chaudhry	6 February 2018	14 December 2033	
12	Agha Faisal	6 February 2018	7 November 2034	
13	Abdul Mobeen Lakho	29 August 2019	13 November 2032	
14	Zulfiqar Ali Sangi	29 August 2019	14 September 2035	
15	Saman Rafat Imtiaz	17 December 2021	7 June 2038	Transferred from IHC on 29th April 2026
16	Amjad Ali Bohio	14 April 2023	1 May 2027	
17	Sana Akram Minhas	14 April 2023	27 September 2030	
18	Jawad Akbar Sarwana	14 April 2023	25 August 2034	
19	Muhammad Abdur Rahman	14 April 2023	23 May 2038	
20	Arbab Ali Hakro	14 April 2023	2 August 2038	
21	Miran Muhammad Shah	29 January 2025	27 December 2026	
22	Tasneem Sultana	29 January 2025	14 May 2028	
23	Riazat Ali Sahar	29 January 2025	17 July 2028	
24	Muhammad Hasan Akber	29 January 2025	25 January 2030	
25	Abdul Hamid Bhurgri	29 January 2025	14 July 2032	
26	Jan Ali Junejo	29 January 2025	15 May 2036	
27	Nisar Ahmed Bhanbhro	29 January 2025	24 January 2038	
28	Ali Haider Ada	29 January 2025	4 April 2040	
29	Muhammad Osman Ali Hadi	29 January 2025	18 August 2040	
30	Muhammad Jaffer Raza	29 January 2025	26 December 2044	
31	Khalid Hussain Shahani	29 January 2025	31 December 2030	Additional judge, subject to confirmation
32	Muhammad Humayon Khan	12 August 2026	1 March 2028	Additional judge, subject to confirmation
33	Suresh Kumar	12 August 2026	26 July 2031	Additional judge, subject to confirmation
34	Shah Nawaz Memon	12 August 2026	31 December 2039	Additional judge, subject to confirmation
35	Vacant			
36	Vacant			
37	Vacant			
38	Vacant			
39	Vacant			
40	Vacant			

== See also ==
- Supreme Court of Pakistan
- Sindh Judicial Academy
- Lahore High Court
- Peshawar High Court
- Balochistan High Court
- Islamabad High Court
