= Agra (disambiguation) =

Agra or AGRA may refer to:

== Places ==
=== Asia ===
- Agra, a city in Uttar Pradesh and site of the Taj Mahal
  - Agra Subah, a Mughal top-level imperial province
  - Agra Province, a former region of British India
  - Agra Presidency, a former region of British India
  - Agra division, an administrative unit of the Indian state of Uttar Pradesh
  - Agra district, a district within the Agra division
  - Agra Fort, located in Agra, India, also known as Lal Qila, Fort Rouge and Red Fort of Agra
  - Agra (Lok Sabha constituency), a parliamentary constituency in Uttar Pradesh
  - Agra (Graduates Constituency), an electoral constituency in the Uttar Pradesh Legislative Council
- Agra, Bhopal, a village in Madhya Pradesh, India
- Agra (union council), an administrative unit in the Khyber Pakhtunkhwa province of Pakistan
- Agra, Punjab, a town in the Punjab province of Pakistan
- Agra, Sindh, a town in the Sindh province of Pakistan

=== Europe ===
- Agra, Lombardy, a municipality in Italy, located in the province of Varese
- Agra, Switzerland, a former municipality now located in Collina d'Oro
- Agra, Kalloni, a village on the island of Lesbos in Greece
- Agra, Rhodope, a settlement in the Rhodope regional unit, Greece
- Agra, a sanctuary of the goddess Demeter near the river Ilissus

=== North America ===
- Agra, California, an uninhabited area along the coastline of present-day Marine Corps Base Camp Pendleton in San Diego County
- Agra, Kansas, a city in Phillips County, US
- Agra, Oklahoma, a town in Lincoln County, US

== People ==
- Agra (surname)

== Film and television ==
- Agra (2007 film), an Indian film
- Agra (2023 film), an Indian film by Kanu Behl

== Other uses ==
- Agra (beetle), a genus of carabid beetles
- Agra, site of an exhibition center as well as a green space in Leipzig and Markkleeberg in Saxony, Germany
- AGRA, a Canadian engineering design and services company, specialising in construction engineering, merged into AMEC in 2001
- Alliance for a Green Revolution in Africa (AGRA), agricultural nonprofit organization founded in 2006
- Army Group Royal Artillery (AGRA), a British military formation type during World War II

== See also ==
- Agra Road (disambiguation)
- Agara (disambiguation)
- Agrabad (disambiguation)
- Agora (disambiguation)
- Conagra
