= Mahtani =

Mahtani may refer to:

== People ==
- Nandita Mahtani (born 1976), Indian fashion designer
- Rajan Mahtani (born 1948), Zambian-Indian businessman
- Shalini Mahtani (born 1972), Hong Kong-Indian businesswoman

== Other uses ==
- Mahtani (Sindh), a Pakistani village
