= Human Technology =

- Discipline: Technology, Sociology, Organizational psychology, Communication
- Language: English
- Edited by: Kristiina Korjonen-Kuusipuro and Adam Wojciechowski

Publication details
- History: 2005–present
- Publisher: Centre of Sociological Research (Poland)
- Frequency: Triannually
- Open access: Open Access

Standard abbreviations
- ISO 4: Hum. Technol.

Indexing
- ISSN: 1795-6889
- LCCN: 2006209413

Links
- Journal homepage

Human Technology is an open-access, peer-reviewed, academic journal focusing on the interaction between people and technology. As of September 2021, the journal is published by the Centre of Sociological Research in Szczecin, Poland. Previously, the journal was co-published by the Agora Center and the University of Jyväskylä (2005-2016), and then by the Open Science Centre and the University of Jyväskylä (2017-2021). Initially, the journal published biannually; it has been published three times a year since 2018.

== Editors ==
- Kristiina Korjonen-Kuusipeura (current)
- Adam Wojciechowski (current)
- Jukka Jouhki (2018-2021)
- Pertti Hurme (2015-2017)
- Päivi Häkkinen (2012-2014)
- Pertti Saariluoma (2005-2011), founding editor

== Indexing ==
Human Technology is listed in the Directory of Open Access Journals (Lund University Libraries), and is cited and/or abstracted in various databases, including: Scopus, PsycINFO (American Psychological Association), Ebsco, and ProQuest.

== See also ==
- Affective computing
- Technology and society
- Educational technology
- Learning platform
