= Agra Road =

Agra Road may refer to:

- Agra Road railway station, former station in Mumbai, India
- Agra Road (film), a 1957 Bollywood film by Ravindra Dave

== See also ==
- Agra (disambiguation)
