= Wadavali railway station =

Former railway station in Mumbai, India

Wadavali was a station on the Salsette–Trombay Railway. It was dismantled after the rail line closed down in 1934. The area is in the Trombay region of Mumbai.
