= Mahul Road railway station =

Defunct railway station in Maharashtra, India

Mahul Road was a station on the Salsette–Trombay Railway in the Mahul region of Trombay in north-east Mumbai (Bombay), India. It was dismantled after the rail line closed in 1934. The tracks still are lying unused at the eastern side of the present day Kurla Railway Station on the Mumbai Suburban Railway system under Central Railway just on the left side of the platform number -8 heading in direction towards Sion and southern part of Mumbai One can see these tracks as they lie unused since 1934. The present day Andheri-Kurla road that exists is built in memory to represent the fact that at one point in time before India became independent it had connections to link Andheri to Kurla.
