= Adam Wojciechowski =

Adam Wojciechowski may refer to:

- Adam Wojciechowski (rower) (born 1980), Polish rower
- Adam Wojciechowski (engineer) (fl. 1999–present), Polish engineer and professor
