= Agho =

Agho may refer to:

- Nelson Agho, Spanish professional footballer
- Agho Obaseki, paramount Chief in the Benin Empire from 1898 to 1914
- Agho Island, a small, mostly uninhabited island in northeastern Iloilo, Philippines

== See also ==
- Aghora (disambiguation)
