= Anushakti Nagar =

Anushakti Nagar अणुशक्ती नगर
- Suburb
- Location within Mumbai
- Coordinates: 19°2′11″N 72°55′21″E
- Country: India
- State: Maharashtra
- District: Mumbai Suburban
- City: Mumbai

Government
  - Type: Municipal Corporation
  - Body: Brihanmumbai Municipal Corporation (MCGM)

Languages
  - Official: Marathi
- Time zone: UTC+5:30 (IST)
- PIN: 400094
- Area code: 022
- Vehicle registration: MH 03
- Civic agency: BMC

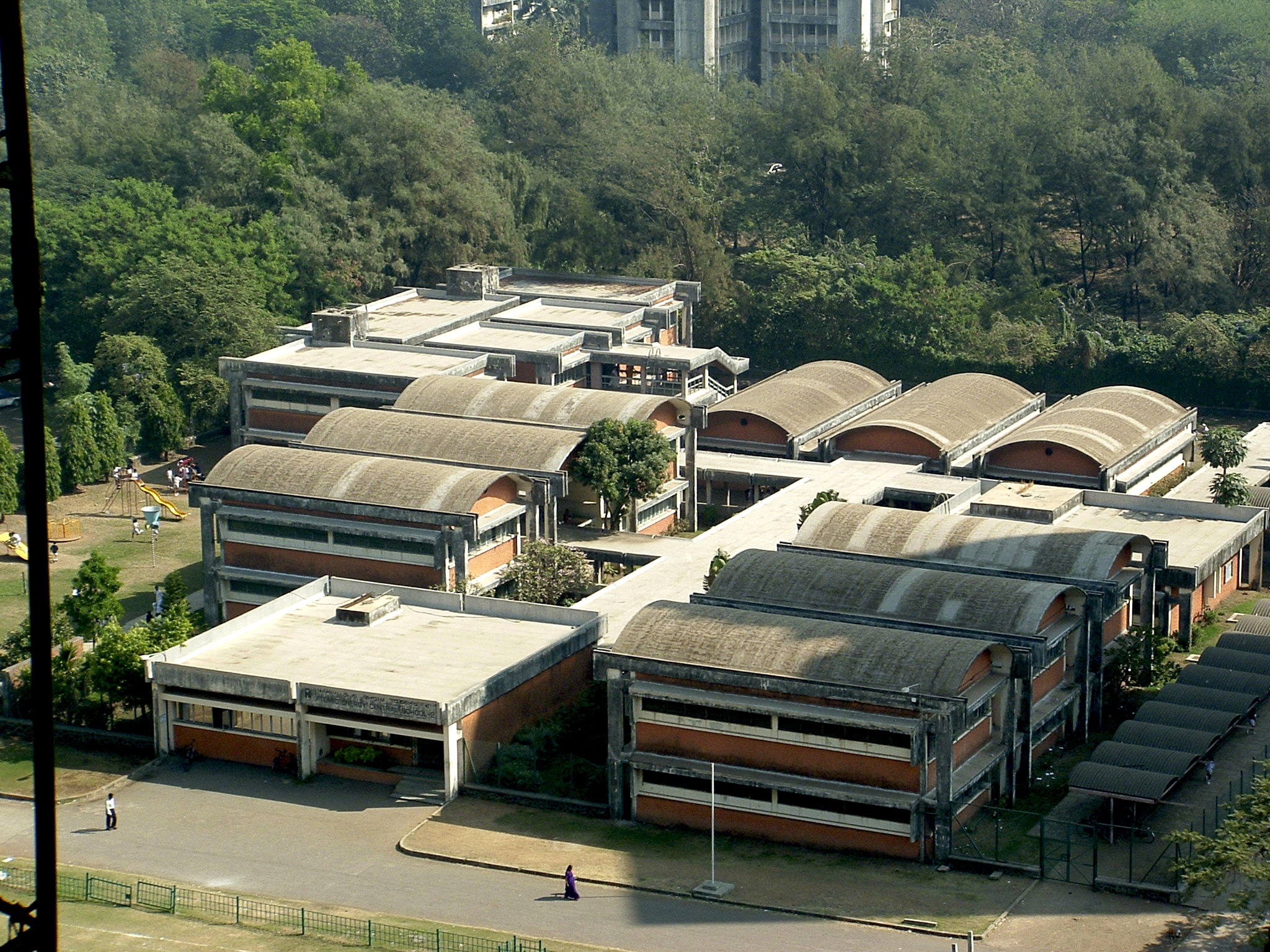
Atomic Energy Central School - 2

Anushakti Nagar is the residential township of the Bhabha Atomic Research Center, Nuclear Power Corporation of India, Directorate of Construction Services and Estate Management, Atomic Energy Education Society in Mumbai, Maharashtra, India. Anu Shakti means atomic power in Sanskrit. Spread over more than 940 acres, this residential complex for the employees of Department of Atomic Energy of the Government of India in Mumbai, is situated in North-east Mumbai. Anushakti Nagar claims to be the largest scientific community (in a single area) in the world. It has the largest central library on the continent in nuclear science and technology.

== About ==
In the early 1960s the government decided to expand the nuclear research (see BARC) facility in (what was then) a distant suburb of Mumbai. The township is about 3 km north of the research centre.

Anushakti Nagar is a well planned self-contained community with a population of about 45,000. It has residential flat, sports and recreation facilities, schools, medical clinics, a large hospital, banks, post office and transport links to many parts of Mumbai. It has 6 Shopping Centres commonly known as Markets housing local retailers & supermarket:

- Sector Market
- Hastinapur Market
- Mandala Market
- Western Sector Market
- Brindavan Market
- Kamet Market

The atomic research centre and the town maintenance is funded by the central (federal) government. The complex is sprawling and lies stretched out alongside four suburbs - Govandi, Mankhurd, New Mandala and Trombay. The other facilities include two Community Centres for social occasions and gatherings, various departmental and co-operative stores, 1 restaurant and 1 creche. The electricity to the colony is provided by TATA Power and the cable (and more recently, cablenet) by ANUSAT club. For the benefits of residents, Janta Seva serves an exclusive shopping cart.

Anushakti Nagar has 17 high-rises and numerous buildings, that have grades, depending on flat-size, and are allotted on the basis of seniority to DAE employees. The nomenclature of these buildings is unique, with names taken from:

- Indian heritage (Nalanda, Hastinapur, Pataliputra, Indraprastha, Takshashila, Kapilvastu)
- Rivers (Sindhu, Saraswati, Godavari, Narmada, Saryu, Alaknanda, Bhagirathi, Ghaghra, Gomti, Ganga, Yamuna, Satluj, Brahmaputra etc.)

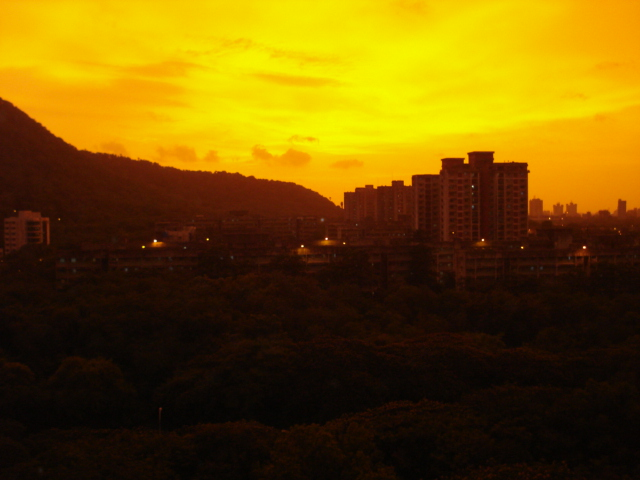
Anushakti Nagar during sunset

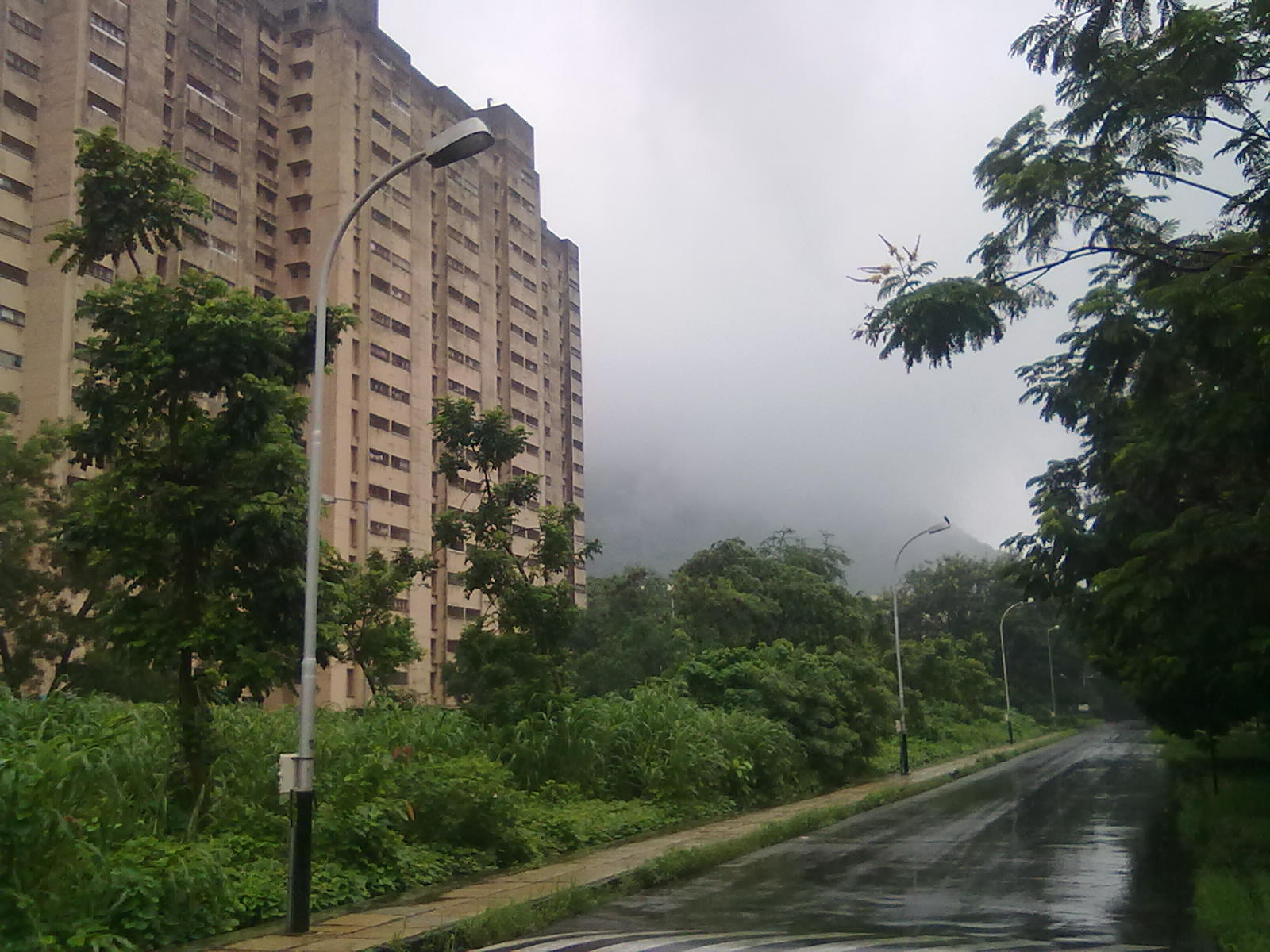
Anushakti Nagar in rainy season

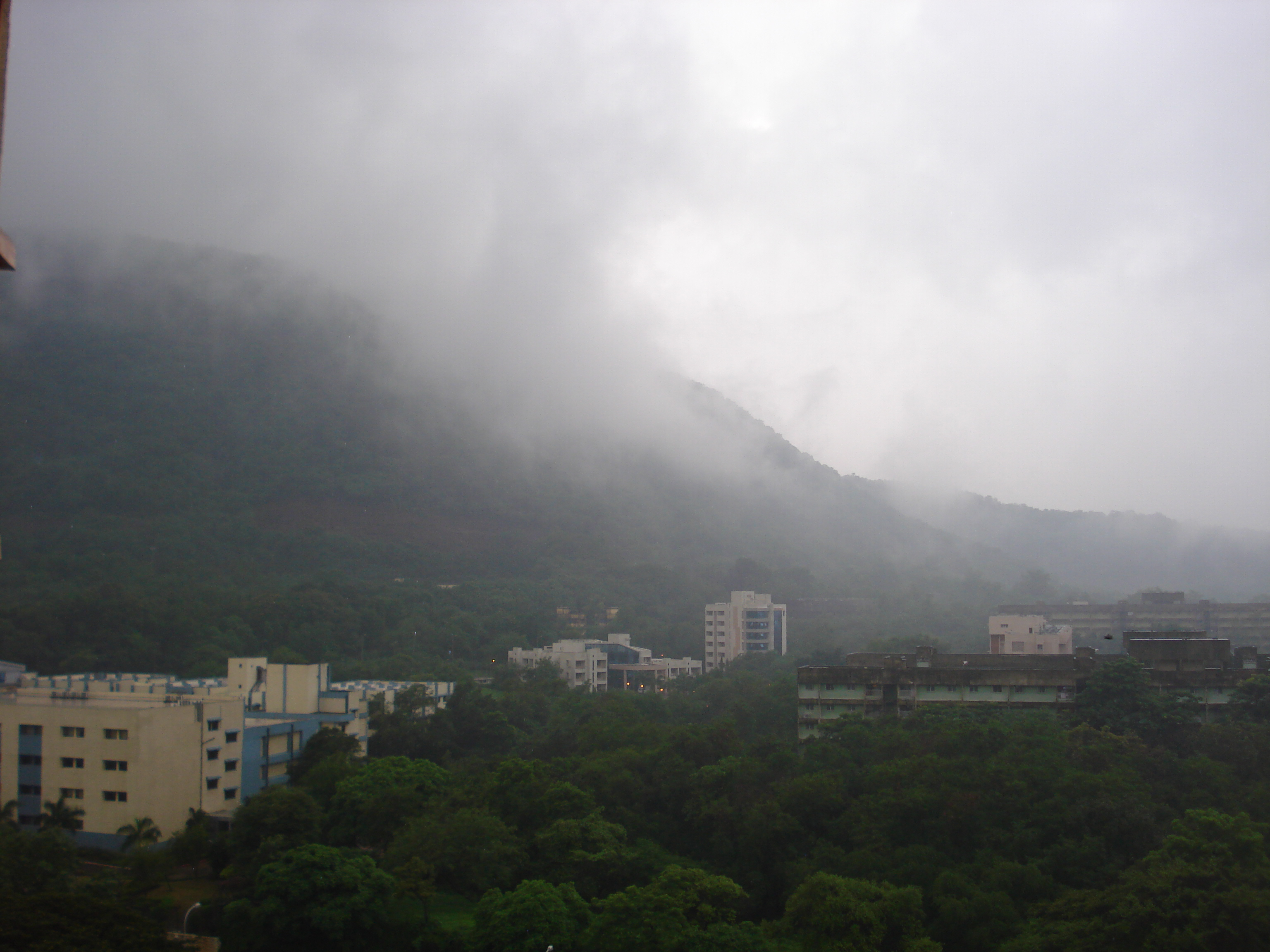
Hills near Anushakti Nagar

- Himalayan peaks (Kamet, Annapurna, Kanchenjunga, Dhawalgiri, Nandadevi {Nanda Devi}, Gaurishankar {Gauri Sankar}, Everest, Kamet etc.)
- Hill-stations (Venkatgiri, Almora, Gulmarg, Mount Abu, Mussoorie etc.), Hill-ranges (Sahyadri, Vindhya, Satpura, Aravalli, Nilgiri etc.)
- Historical Places (Sanchi, Ajanta, Ellora, Shantiniketan, Sriniketan, Golconda etc.)
- Hindu pilgrimage sites (Kailash, Badrinath, Kedarnath, Dwarka, Sarnath, Bhavani etc.)
- Saints (Meera, Namdev, Jaidev, Ramdas, Tulsidas, Kabir, Tukaram, Chaitanya etc.),
- Classical Ragas (the Raagmala buildings - Mohana, Deepak, Malhar, Darbari, Ranjani, Lalit, Bhairavi etc.)
- Historical schools and colleges (ShriNikentan, Shanti Niketan)

The Mandala "suburb" of this township has buildings named after seasons (Hemant, Sharad, Varsha)

Some buildings of New Mandala are named after flowers like Pankaj, Kamal, Champa, Parijat, Gulmohar, Kumud etc.)

Recent additions to the high-rises are two new buildings: Udayagiri and Malayagiri, both of which are state of the art, spacious and well designed. On 31 October 2023, Another two new buildings have been inaugurated under the names of "JAINTIA" & "PARASNATH" which takes the total tally upto 19.

The Central Avenue road which divides Anushakti Nagar roughly into two halves, connects its main entrance with the BARC North Gate. It is a 2+2 lane divided by a 70-foot-wide (21 m) green stretch which runs all along. The authorities have recently named roads in Anushaktinagar under famous personalities including the Central Avenue Road which was renamed as Dr.Homi.J.Bhabha Marg (Marg means Way in Hindi). Other road names include :

- Dr. A.P.J Abdul Kalam Marg
- Vidyarthi Marg
- Dr. Shekhar Basu Marg (erst. CISF Marg)
- Dr. Raja Rammanna Marg

Anushakti Nagar can be said to be divided into three parts:

- Anushakti Nagar
- New Mandala
- Western Sector

== Locality ==
Anushakti Nagar is located about 20 km north-east of Mumbai downtown.

It is part of the Mumbai South Central (Lok Sabha constituency) which until mid-1990s was the largest (by population) Lok Sabha constituency in India, but it was called Mumbai North-East then. It is bordered on one side by a large hill which is the highest in Mumbai.

== People ==
Many teachers of the AECS schools of Anushakti Nagar have also been awarded Presidents Gold Medals.

- Shreya Ghoshal a lead singer - a national awardee
- Parag Agrawal, Former CEO of X. formerly Twitter
- Suryakumar Yadav, an international cricketer, T20 International captain of India.
- Lalchand Rajput, Cricketer
- Naushad Moosa, Footballer, Indian National Team.
- Manasi Joshi, Indian Para- Badminton Player.

== Education ==
The education up to XII standard for the residents is provided by Atomic Energy Education Society through Atomic Energy Central School (AECS), which are numbered 1 through 6, and a sprawling Atomic Energy Junior College (AEJC) for grades 11 and 12, on the foot of the Trombay Hill. Now the AECS School No. 4 has grade 11 and grade 12 under the CBSE.

These schools cater to about 7000 students. Admission to these schools is strictly for children whose parents or guardians are employees of the Department of Atomic Energy (DAE) and/or the Bhabha Atomic Research Centre (BARC). Despite the higher quality of education provided through these schools, the fee structure is highly subsidised and is an incentive for many employees to prefer to stay in Anushakti Nagar. Recently the AECS have started admitting grandchildren of the DAE/BARC/NPC employees as well. Non-DAE students are admitted in these schools at higher fees. The school system follows the CBSE (Central Board of Secondary Education). The medium of instruction is English.

Anushakti Nagar is host to BARC Training School, established in the year 1956, along with Homi Bhabha National Institute, which is a Deemed University. The BARC Training School is running Orientation Course for Engineering graduates and Science post-graduates (OCES) and serves as in-house human resource training centre for Department of Atomic Energy. Homi Bhabha National Institute is located near BARC Training School. The HBNI provides an academic framework for integrating basic research being done at its grant-in-aid institutions and the research centres of DAE with technology development at the research centres. The institute trains manpower in the sciences including engineering sciences for taking up a career in nuclear science and technology and related areas in the Department of Atomic Energy or elsewhere. The institute also provides continuing education for the employees of the DAE.

The Training School Hostel (TSH), and the New Bachelor's Hostel (NBH) provide accommodation for BARC trainees, as well as for interns and students who come for various academic purposes (like training for International Mathematics Olympiad or International Physics Olympiad etc.) Recently, a new hostel has been inaugurated which is especially for Postgraduate students.

== Leisure and sports ==
It has a New Community Centre (NCC) established in the year 1991 and DAE Cultural Centre (DCC) established on 01-Dec-2015 by DAE Sports and Cultural Council for sports and cultural activities. NCC has facilities for playing indoor games like badminton & table-tennis, Billiards, gym, etc., and conducts training in performing arts like Western Dance, Musical Instrument, etc. DCC has the mandate of promotion of cultural activities, performing and visual arts of classical, traditional and contemporary genres. DCC conducts various cultural events and training programs in and around Anushakti Nagar.

There is one field each for Football, Cricket and Hockey, 9 floodlit Tennis Courts, 2 Basketball courts and 2 volleyball courts and a large number of badminton courts. There are vast playgrounds spread across the colony. It also has a few scattered basketball courts, volleyball facilities, and a huge football field near the junior college. A new sports complex with a swimming pool is also available for indoor games presently. It has produced many domestic & international cricketers like Lalchand Rajput & Surya Kumar Yadav along with international badminton player and national table tennis players like Rajat Hubli and also international Parabadminton champion Manasi Joshi (She is 2017, Tokyo, Japan, Champion in Women's doubles paired with Quixa Yang from China. The official football clubs of this town is Soccer Club De Mumbai And Anushaktinagar Football Association).

== See also ==
- Anushakti Nagar (Vidhan Sabha constituency)

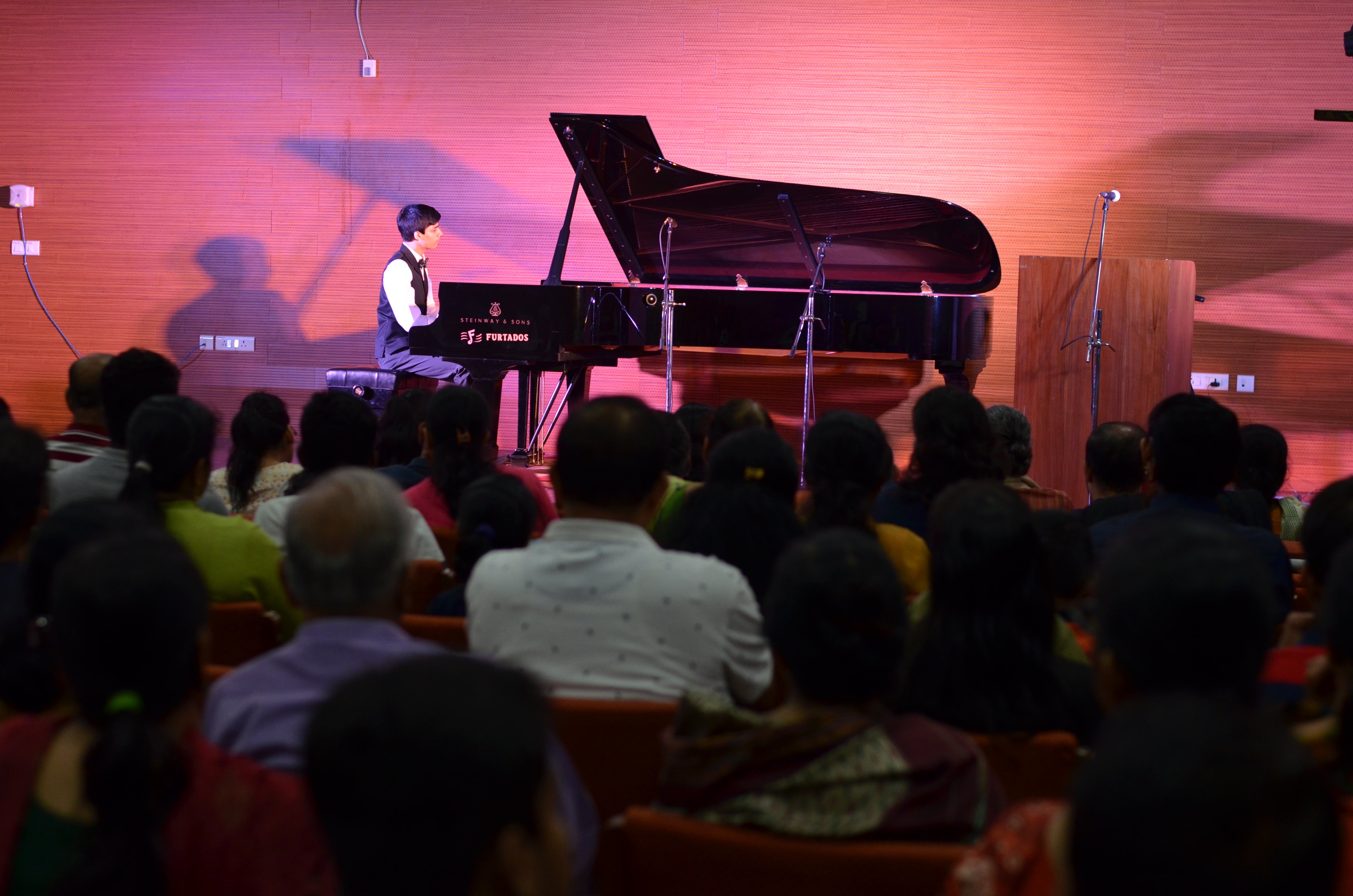
Master Milen Manoj Earath in the first ever piano concert of Anushaktinagar conducted by DAE Cultural Centre
