= PMSM =

PMSM may refer to:

- Police Medal for Meritorious Service, a civil decoration of Hong Kong
- Permanent-magnet synchronous motor, a type of motor
