= Maria de Fátima Agra =

Brazilian botanist (born 1952)

- Born: 1952 (age 73–74)
- Education: University of São Paulo
- Scientific career
- Fields: Botany
- Workplaces: Federal University of Paraíba
- Doctoral advisor: Ana Maria Giulietti
- Author abbrev. (botany): Agra

Maria de Fátima Agra (born 1952) is a Brazilian botanist and associate professor at the Federal University of Paraíba (UFPB), in João Pessoa, Paraíba, Brazil. Agra specializes in ethnobotany, pharmacognosy, and plant morphology, particularly pertaining to plants of the family Solanaceae in northeastern Brazil.

== Biography ==
Agra earned an undergraduate degree in Pharmaceutical Sciences from the Federal University of Paraíba (1977), a master's degree in botany from the Federal University of Pernambuco (1991), and a doctorate in Biological Sciences (specializing in botany) from the University of São Paulo (2001). She chairs the Postgraduate Program in Natural Products and Bioactive Synthetics at the UFPB. She is a founding editor of the Revista UNIPLAC and a member of the Botanical Society of Brazil (Sociedade Botânica do Brasil), of which she served as vice president in 2001.

Agra has published and served as a peer reviewer extensively in various languages, including the scholarly journals Rodriguésia, Novon, Journal of Ethnopharmacology, Annals of Tropical Medicine & Parasitology, Pharmaceutical Biology, and the European Journal of Pharmacology. According to Google Scholar, Agra's h-index is 32, and researchers have cited her work more than 5,100 times.

Under the author abbreviation "Agra," she has described sixteen plant species.
