= Civil decorations of Hong Kong =

Awards given to members of the Hong Kong Civil Service

A list of awards given to members of the Hong Kong Civil Service:

== Hong Kong Police Medal for Distinguished Service (PDSM) ==
1998

- Mr Chau Foo-cheong, PDSM

1999

- Mr Lam Kin, Lionel, PDSM

2000

- Mr Michael Harold Francis, PDSM
- Mr Chan Tit-kin, PDSM
- Mr Lai Pak-hay, Patrick, PDSM

2001

- Mr Cheung Chi-shum, PDSM
- Mr Christopher Lam, PDSM

2002

- Mr Harold Murdoch Blud, PDSM
- Mr Yuen Ying-lam, John, PDSM
- Mr Richard Ian Tyzzer, PDSM

2003

- Mr Lee Siu-kin, PDSM
- Mr Martin Samson, PDSM

2004

- Mr Chan Wai-ki, Thomas, PDSM
- Mr Tang King-shing, PDSM
- Mr Peter Charles Burbridge-King, PDSM
- Mr Mak Man-poon, Edward, PDSM
- Mr David Graham Thomas, PDSM
- Mr Chung Hiu-pang, John, PDSM

2005

- Mr Leung Lau-on, PDSM
- Mr Wong Pak-nin, PDSM
- Ms Barbara Rose Willison, PDSM
- Mr Fok Man-kwan, Ronald, PDSM
- Mr Yam Tat-wing, PDSM
- Mr Barry Christopher Griffin, PDSM
- Mr Kwok Chi-shun, Arthur, PDSM

== Hong Kong Fire Services Medal for Distinguished Service (FSDSM) ==
2000

- Ms Vera Krause, FSDSM, JP
- Mr Donnely, FSDSM, JP

2001

- Sir Abraham Newton, FSDSM, JP
- Mr G H Lessing, FSDSM

2002

- Mr Gregory, FSDSM, JP
- Dr Krüger, FSDSM

2003

- Mr Lee Chee-chung, FSDSM, JP

2004

- Mrs Chu Moffatt, Charles, FSDSM

2005

- Mr Tynan, FSDSM
- Mr Wynne, Gregory, FSDSM

2008

- Mr Fung Kam-wah, FSDSM

2015

- Mr Li Kin-yat, FSMSM
- Mr Yeung Sai-him, John, FSMSM
- Mr Yeung Chung-hau, FSMSM

== Hong Kong Immigration Service Medal for Distinguished Service (IDSM) ==
1998

- Mr Lee Siu-kwong, Ambrose, IDSM, JP
- Mr Cheuk Koon-cham, IDSM, JP

1999

- Choy Ping-tai, IDSM, JP

2000

- Mr Mak Kwai-yun, IDSM
- Mr Wong Tat-po, Eric, IDSM

2001

- Mr Lai Tung-kwok, IDSM
- Mr Siu Chung-kit, Henry, IDSM

2002

- Mr Chow Kwok-chuen, IDSM
- Mr Choi Ping-lun, IDSM

2003

- Mr Choy Tak-po, IDSM

2004

- Mr Tsoi Hon-kuen, IDSM

== Hong Kong Customs and Excise Medal for Distinguished Service (CDSM) ==
1998

- Mr Tong Hin-yeung, David, CDSM

1999

- Mr Poon Yeung-kwong, CDSM

2000

- Mr Li Wai-man, CDSM, JP

2003

- Mrs Kwok YOUNG Mei-ki, CDSM

2004

- Mr Chow Kwong, CDSM
- Mr Chow Oi-tung, William, CDSM
- Mr Wong Sau-pui, CDSM

== Hong Kong Correctional Services Medal for Distinguished Service (CSDSM) ==
1998

- Miss Bonnie Wong, CSDSM
- Mr Pang Sung-yuen, Kelvin, CSDSM, JP
- Mr Cheng Chi-leung, CSDSM, JP

2001

- Mr Kwok Leung-ming, CSDSM
- Mr Chan Chun-yan, CSDSM

2002

- Mr Leung Kam-yau, Sunny, CSDSM
- Mr Chan Kong-sang, Dicky, CSDSM

2005

- Mr Hui Tak-fuk, Daniel, CSDSM

2007

- Mr Pang Sung-yuen, SBS, CSDSM

== Government Flying Service Medal for Distinguished Service (GDSM) ==
2002

- Mr Graeme Macgregor McIntosh, GDSM

2005

- Captain Lee Ngau-chai, Johnny, GDSM

== Hong Kong ICAC Medal for Distinguished Service (IDS) ==
1998

- Mr Li Ming-chak, Daniel, IDS
- Mr Kwok Man-wai, IDS

1999

- Mr Lee Chun-sang, Francis, IDS

2000

- Mr Chan Chi-sun, IDS
- Mr Wong Sai-chiu, IDS

2001

- Mr Chan Tak-shing, Gilbert, IDS

2002

- Mr Michael John Bishop, IDS

2003

- Mr Anthony Alan Godfrey, IDS

2005

- Mr Chan Chor-keung, Stephen, IDS

== Hong Kong Police Medal for Meritorious Service (PMSM) ==
1998

- Mr David Allan Whyte, PMSM
- Mr Kevan Cooper, PMSM
- Mr Chu Wing-hong, PMSM
- Mr Lee Hung-kai, PMSM
- Mr Ho Chi-chiu, PMSM
- Mr Ng Chee-kin, PMSM
- Mr Yiu Mook-ting, PMSM
- Mrs Bonnie Yee-lo Smith, PMSM
- Mr Ko Chi-ming, PMSM
- Mr Ma Chik-man PMSM
- Mr Brian John Heard, PMSM
- Mr NgaiAI Fung-yee, PMSM
- Mr Chik Ki-yan, PMSM
- Mr Chan Chin-cheung, PMSM
- Mrs Liu Lau Yuk-chun, PMSM
- Mr Tang Kam-moon, PMSM
- Mr Tang King-shing, PMSM
- Mr Au Ka-hing, PMSM
- Mr Lo Chuen-man, PMSM
- Mr Au Hok-lam, PMSM
- Mr Paul Janvrin Deal, PMSM

1999

- Mr Peter Geoffrey Hunt, PMSM
- Mr Koo Sii-hong, PMSM
- Mr Kong Shing-shun, PMSM
- Mr Peter George Else, PMSM
- Mr Li Chung-kin, PMSM
- Mr Li Chi-keung, PMSM
- Mr Lam Kam-hung, PMSM
- Mr Yuen Pui-wing, PMSM
- Mr Geoffrey Leonard Merrick, PMSM
- Mr Cheung Shui-chun, PMSM
- Mr Leung Lau-on, PMSM
- Mr Chan Kwing-chun, PMSM
- Mr Chan Wai-ki, Thomas, PMSM
- Mr Chan Lun, PMSM
- Mr Tsang Wai-hung, PMSM
- Mr Yip Suen, PMSM
- Mr Chow Yin-wo, PMSM
- Ms Barbara Rose Willison, PMSM
- Mr Lau Kwok-lai, PMSM
- Mr Choy Wise, PMSM
- Mr Stuart Edwin Jones, PMSM
- Mr Denis Claude Cunningham, PMSM
- Mr Tam Kwok-wing, PMSM

2000

- Mr John Francis Breen, PMSM
- Mr Kong Chi-kai, PMSM
- Mr Lee Ka-chiu, PMSM
- Mr Li Tat-wah, PMSM
- Mr To Chun-wai, Clarence, PMSM
- Mr Chau Siu-man, PMSM
- Mr Yung Tak-wai, PMSM
- Mr Cheung Siu-wah, Charlie, PMSM
- Mr Leung Yan-keung, PMSM
- Mr Hui Hon-hung, PMSM
- Mr Chan Kit-chu, Anthony, PMSM
- Mr Tong Chi-wah, PMSM
- Mr Wong Pak-nin, PMSM
- Mr Wand Wel-hung, PMSM
- Mr YeungG Hong-yuen, PMSM
- Mr Kevin Michael Woods, PMSM
- Mr Lau Chi-keung, PMSM
- Mrs Lau To Yuet-ha, PMSM
- Mr Lau Kam-wah, PMSM
- Mrs Lau Tse Kam-har, Angela, PMSM
- Mr Cheng Kwok-keung, PMSM
- Mr Tang Hau-sing, Richard, PMSM
- Mr Fok Man-kwan, Ronald, PMSM
- Mr Lung Hung-cheuk, PMSM
- Mr Jawaid Khan, PMSM
- Mr Ngai Chi-keung, PMSM

2001

- Miss Shek Kei-ping, PMSM
- Mr Ho Kwok-cheung, PMSM
- Mr Lee Woon-luen, David, PMSM
- Mr Lee Wai-lam, PMSM
- Mr Chiu Ming-yiu, PMSM
- Mr Lam Ting-on, PMSM
- Mr Lam Cho-lam, PMSM
- Mr Hung Hak-wai, Paul, PMSM
- Mr Hung Hing-lun, Ricky, PMSM
- Mr Roderick David George Colson, PMSM
- Mr Cheung Kwok-wai, PMSM
- Mr Nicholas Alexandre William McQueen, PMSM
- Mr Wong Chung-kee, PMSM
- Mr Wong Sak-pang, PMSM
- Mr Yeung Kam-ming, PMSM
- Mr Chiang Kwok-wah, PMSM
- Mr Tang Chun-kwok, PMSM
- Mr Sit Ka-shun, PMSM
- Mr Chung Hok-yee, PMSM

2002

- Mr Yau Hing-fung, PMSM
- Mr Chu Kwok-cheung, PMSM
- Mrs Kong Cheung Chi-lan, PMSM
- Mr Ho Kwok-hung, PMSM
- Mr Chow Kwok-kee, PMSM
- Mr Cheung Kwok-chung, PMSM
- Mr Leung Hung-yau, PMSM
- Mr Chan Chun-hing, PMSM
- Mr Chan Hon-shing, PMSM
- Mr Mak Hung-fu, PMSM
- Mr Fung Kwok-on, PMSM
- Mr Ip Lau-chuen, PMSM
- Mr Ip Wai-keung, PMSM
- Mr Ip Po-chuen, PMSM
- Mr Lau Yung-kan, PMSM
- Mr Tang Choi, PMSM
- Mr Lo Tat-fai, PMSM
- Mr David Hugh Tallon, PMSM
- Mrs Lo Li Chui-mei, PMSM
- Mr So Hoi-chuen, PMSM

2003

- Mr Kong Cheuk-fai, PMSM
- Mr Ho Ying-hung, PMSM
- Mr Ng Wui-tat, PMSM
- Mr Sun Yu-wai, PMSM
- Mr Lam Yin-ming, Lawrence, PMSM
- Mr Lam Hon-kei, PMSM
- Mr David John Carver Trotter, PMSM
- Mr Wu Chung-hon, PMSM
- Mr Ling Ching-yan, PMSM
- Mr Tsui Hok-ming, PMSM
- Miss Ma Po-lin, PMSM
- Mr Cheung Sau-wah, Joseph, PMSM
- Mr Cheung Wui, Thomas, PMSM
- Mr Leung Shiu-yuk, PMSM
- Mr Alan R. Cox, PMSM
- Mr Chan Kin-hung, PMSM
- Mr Fung Kin-man, PMSM
- Mr Ip Ping, PMSM
- Mr Lui Ma-sun, Mason, PMSM
- Mr Tam Kwok-yau, PMSM

2004

- Mr Wong Lap-ping, PMSM
- Mr Ng Ka-sing, David, PMSM
- Mr Li Chi-shing, PMSM
- Mr Ling Sin-ching, PMSM
- Mr Noel Desmond Howcroft, PMSM
- Mr Yiu Chi-ming, PMSM
- Mr Yiu Kai-bor, PMSM
- Mr Philip James Woolcott-Brown, PMSM
- Mr Cheung Yee-tim, PMSM
- Mr Cheung Pak-man, Danny, PMSM
- Mr Cheung Hung-tai, PMSM
- Ms Leung Ching-kwan, Grace, PMSM
- Mr Jeffrey Owen Herbert, PMSM
- Mr Chan Sing-tak, PMSM
- Mr Chan Yiu-kwok, PMSM
- Mr Pang Moon-kwan, PMSM
- Mr Chiu Ngai-man, PMSM
- Mr Choy Kin-cheung, PMSM
- Mrs Choi Wong Fung-yee, PMSM
- Mr Tang How-kong, PMSM
- Mr Chung Fat-yeung, PMSM
- Mr Kan Chi-kwong, PMSM
- Mr Austin Kerrigan, PMSM

2005

- Mr Ho Siu-wing, PMSM
- Mr Lui Chi-hoi, PMSM
- Mr Lui Kwai-hoi, PMSM
- Mr Li Chiu-keung, PMSM
- Mr Cheuk Chun-yin, Albert, PMSM
- Ms Tsui Yee-lin, Elaine, PMSM
- Mr Ma Wai-luk, PMSM
- Mr John Alan Cox, PMSM
- Mr Wong Che-kwong, PMSM
- Mr Wong Wai-fung, Anthony, PMSM
- Mr Yeung Yuk-fai, PMSM
- Mr Ip Kwok-fu, PMSM
- Mr Liu Ho-yee, Alan, PMSM
- Mrs Lau Wong Chun-lai, PMSM
- Mr Lau Chi-keung, PMSM
- Mr Cheng Se-lim, Stephen, PMSM
- Mr Cheng Kwok-ping, PMSM
- Mr Tang Yiu-cheung, PMSM
- Mr William Wallace Murison, PMSM
- Mr Lai Kam-wing, PMSM
- Mr Tse Keung, PMSM
- Mr Kevin Hugh Laurie, PMSM
- Mrs Peasley Kwan Mei-sim, PMSM
- Mr Yim Wai-kwok, PMSM

== Hong Kong Fire Services Medal for Meritorious Service (FSMSM) ==
1998

- Mr Chu Ping-hang, FSMSM
- Mr Lee Chee-chung, FSMSM
- Mr Yau Hoi-yeung, FSMSM
- Mr Cheung Ho-mo, FSMSM
- Mr Tam Chi-chung, FSMSM

1999

- Mr Yuen Hon-kwan, FSMSM
- Mr Butt Wing-keung, Cyril, FSMSM
- Mr Kwok Yiu-loy, FSMSM
- Mr Tang Tat-hung, FSMSM

2000

- Mr Laurence Henry Lee, FSMSM
- Mr Woo King-huen, FSMSM
- Mr Tong Koon-ngai, FSMSM
- Mr Yuen Kam-chuen, FSMSM
- Mr Kwok Shui-kam, FSMSM
- Mr Chan Ho-chin, FSMSM
- Mr Cham Tak-wai, FSMSM
- Mr Tong Choi-yuk, FSMSM
- Mr Wan Shiu-wing, FSMSM
- Mr Lau Yu-ping, Joseph, FSMSM

2001

- Mr Chan Chi-ming, FSMSM
- Mr Chn Kwok-wing, FSMSM
- Mr Wun Hon-bong, Augustine, FSMSM
- Mr Wong Chi-hung, FSMSM
- Mr Yeung Yiu-wing, FSMSM
- Mr Cheng Tak-chuen, Patrick, FSMSM
- Mr Tang Che-hung, FSMSM
- Mr Lai Yuet-yau, FSMSM
- Mr Lai Wai-lau, FSMSM

2002

- Mr Lee Tin-ping, FSMSM
- Mr Lee Kai-yuen, FSMSM
- Mr Chow Wing-tak, FSMSM
- Mr Wu Kar-wo, FSMSM
- Mr Cheung Chi-yin, FSMSM
- Mr Leung Shiu-hong, Matthew, FSMSM
- Mr Fung Kam-wah, FSMSM
- Mr Yeung Yau-yuen, FSMSM

2003

- Mr Lee Mui-lam, FSMSM
- Mr Wong Shun, FSMSM
- Mr Ng Lap-fun, FSMSM
- Mr Chow Kin-chung, FSMSM
- Mr Yuen Hung-chai, FSMSM
- Mr Chan Chi-kwong, FSMSM
- Mr Chan Ping-kuen, FSMSM
- Mr Chan Yun-pui, FSMSM
- Mr Lau Sik-on, FSMSM

2004

- Mr Ting Woon-sum, FSMSM
- Mr Ho Wai-kit, FSMSM
- Mr Ng Bong-loy, FSMSM
- Mr Wu Yiu-wah, FSMSM
- Mr Chan Chor-sing, FSMSM
- Mr Mak Tung-ching, FSMSM
- Mr Tung Tung-san, FSMSM
- Mr Lai Man-hin, FSMSM
- Mr Chung Cheong-wai, FSMSM

2005

- Mr Ho Nai-hoi, FSMSM
- Mr Lui Kin-chung, FSMSM
- Mr Chan Nam-kay, FSMSM
- Mr Wong Sai-chuen, FSMSM
- Mr Wong Hung-cheong, FSMSM
- Mr Choy Chik-wah, FSMSM
- Mr Tse Yui-chiu, FSMSM
- Mr Law Hung, FSMSM

== Hong Kong Immigration Service Medal for Meritorious Service (IMSM) ==
1998

- Mr Ting Wing-chuen, IMSM
- Mr Fong Yiu-hing, IMSM
- Mr Ho Kwok-yan, IMSM
- Mr Leung Ping Kwan, IMSM
- Miss Fung Yuen, Yolanda, IMSM
- Mrs Poon Leung Kit-ching, IMSM
- Mr Huen Shu-sum, IMSM
- Mr Law Yiu-tung, IMSM

1999

- Mr Wong Shiu-wing, John, IMSM
- Mr Li Yat-ming, IMSM
- Mr Hui Kung-shun, IMSM
- Mrs Chan Kwok Yee-wah, Eva, IMSM
- Mr Chan Kar-chuen, IMSM
- Mr Ip Hon-tong, IMSM
- Mr Liu Kwok-keung, IMSM
- Mrs Cheng Chow Kit-yu, IMSM

2000

- Mr Man Hon-yin, IMSM
- Mr Lam Hin-kwan, IMSM
- Mr Cheung Chow, IMSM
- Mr Leung Ka-wai, IMSM
- Mr Yeung Kai-ning, IMSM
- Mr Chiu See-wai, William, IMSM
- Miss Lo Hin-cheung, Elaine, IMSM

2001

- Mr Ho Kam-ping, IMSM
- Mr Ho Wing-tak, IMSM
- Mr Lee Kwok-woo, IMSM
- Mr Wai Fok-cheung, Paul, IMSM
- Mr Ma Chiu-mo, IMSM
- Mr Leung Ka-ching, Peter, IMSM
- Mr Wong Wai-man, Raymond, IMSM
- Mr Tang Man-kit, IMSM

2002

- Mr Au Cheuk-luen, IMSM
- Mr Cheung Lee-kan, IMSM
- Mr Choi Kwok-fai, IMSM
- Mr Lo Man-hong, IMSM
- Mr Yim Kwan-hoi, IMSM

2003

- Mr Ng Ting-hi, IMSM
- Mr Wai Chuen, IMSM
- Mr Chun Yiu, IMSM
- Mrs Au Fan Mei-lin, IMSM
- Mr Chan Kwok-lun, Douglas, IMSM
- Mrs Wong Wong Pak-kei, Peggy, IMSM

2004

- Mr Bok Kwok-on, IMSM
- Mr Wan Siu-fung, IMSM
- Mrs Chow Tong Kit-ling, Ann, IMSM
- Mr Chan Yuk-chuen, IMSM
- Mr Cheng Ping-yat, Bennet, IMSM
- Mr Tse Yiu-cheuk, IMSM

2005

- Mr Ng Kwok-wai, IMSM
- Mr Kong Chi-ming, IMSM
- Mr Cheung Chin-hung, IMSM
- Mr Pang Kin-mo, IMSM
- Miss Wan Shiu-mei, IMSM
- Mr Tam Wing-yin, IMSM

2007

- Mr Mak Kin-ming, IMSM
- Mr Chow Kun-wah, IMSM
- Miss Ng Fung-kwan, IMSM
- Mr Tang Yun-hoi, Alan, IMSM
- Mr So Kin-pong, Samson, IMSM

== Hong Kong Customs and Excise Medal for Meritorious Service (CMSM) ==
1998

- Mr Chow Kwong, CMSM
- Mr Chow Oi-tung, CMSM
- Mr Au Yee-leung, CMSM
- Mrs Kwok Young Mei-ki, CMSM
- Mr Wong Shiu-ming, CMSM

1999

- Mr Chu Ching-wan, CMSM
- Mr Lee Kwok-choy, CMSM
- Mr Wai Chi-hung, CMSM
- Mr Wong Sau-pui, CMSM
- Mr Tse Kwok-yin, CMSM

2000

- Mr Wong Man-on, CMSM
- Mrs Szeto Lam Lai-ping, Virginia, CMSM
- Mr Chow Wing-keung, CMSM
- Mr Leung Ho, CMSM
- Mr Tsang Hing-kam, Ronny, CMSM

2001

- Mr Ho Siu-chung, CMSM
- Mr Chan Chun-wai, CMSM
- Mr Chan Hon-kit, CMSM
- Mr Pang Lock-yuen, CMSM
- Mr Lo Ying-kuen, CMSM

2002

- Mr Li Chung-leung, CMSM
- Mr Lam Ming-mon, CMSM
- Mr Tong Ching-kit, CMSM
- Mr Chan Wing-shing, CMSM
- Mr Tsang Hoi-ping, CMSM
- Mr Man Wing-yiu, CMSM

2003

- Mr Ko Chi-lok, CMSM
- Mr Leung Chi-chiu, William, CMSM
- Mr Leung Koon-wah, CMSM
- Mr Wong Pui-fai, CMSM
- Mr Lai Chun-kong, CMSM
- Mr Kung Yiu-fai, CMSM

2004

- Mr Wong Man-ming, CMSM
- Mr Ho Yick-tung, CMSM
- Mr Ng Wai-ming, CMSM
- Mr Li Man-chi, CMSM
- Mr Au Yeung Ho-lok, Luke, CMSM
- Mr Cheng Kam-muk, CMSM
- Mr Tam Yiu-keung, CMSM

2005

- Mr Wong Ching-lim, CMSM
- Mr Leung Kwong-wing, CMSM
- Mr Tsang Chiu-chun, CMSM
- Mrs Tse Ko Lai-yee, Nora, CMSM
- Mr Tam Wai-lun, CMSM
- Mr So Yuen-sang, CMSM

== Hong Kong Correctional Services Medal for Meritorious Service (CSMSM) ==
1999

- Mr Lee Siu-on, CSMSM
- Mr La Siu-keung, CSMSM
- Mr Cheung Ming, CSMSM
- Mr Cheng Man-wai, CSMSM

2000

- Mr Chu Siu-lam, CSMSM
- Mr Yuen Shu-fan, CSMSM
- Mr Wong Sing-chi, CSMSM
- Mr Lau Kam-tong, CSMSM
- Mr Lau Kam-tong, CSMSM

2001

- Mr Yue Bun-chiu, CSMSM
- Mr Lee Gar-san, CSMSM
- Mr Chan Hon-yiu, CSMSM
- Mr Samson Chan, CSMSM
- Mr Tsang Kwok-keung, CSMSM
- Mr Lau Siu-yin, CSMSM

2002

- Mr Leung Wai-ping, CSMSM
- Mr Kwok Kai-sin, CSMSM
- Mr Mak Wai-kwan, CSMSM
- Mr Wong Tack-sing, CSMSM
- Mr Wong Yiu-chung, CSMSM
- Mr Yeung Kam-sang, CSMSM
- Mr Lung Kwok-kin, CSMSM

2003

- Mr Fong Kung-fu, CSMSM
- Mr Cheung Chi-sing, CSMSM
- Mr Leung Wai-man, CSMSM
- Mr Mok Ho-cheung, CSMSM
- Mr Tsang Wing-kan, CSMSM
- Mr Wong Man-chiu, Vanny, CSMSM
- Mr Ip Pak-keung, CSMSM
- Mr Choy Tin-bo, CSMSM
- Mr Ying Kwok-ching, CSMSM

2004

- Mr Ho Pui-lam, CSMSM
- Mr Lee Kwok-biu, CSMSM
- Mr Lam Fat-wing, CSMSM
- Mr Yiu Chiu-kit, CSMSM
- Mr Hung Wai-cheung, CSMSM
- Mr Leung Kam-shing, CSMSM
- Mr Chan Kow-lun, CSMSM
- Mr Mak Yau-tak, CSMSM
- Mr Kiu Cheung-wan, CSMSM

2005

- Miss Fong Yin, CSMSM
- Mr Lee Wing-hong, CSMSM
- Mr Tsui Siu-kee, CSMSM
- Mr Luk Yiu-man, CSMSM
- Mr Mak Chi-wai, CSMSM
- Mr Fu Shing-chi, CSMSM
- Mr Pang Chi-keung, CSMSM
- Mr Tam Shiu-ming, CSMSM

== Government Flying Service Medal for Meritorious Service (GMSM) ==
2000

- Mr Leung Wing-kei, GMSM
- Mr Chan King-ngai, GMSM

2002

- Mr Choi Chiu-ming, Jimmy, GMSM

2003

- Mr Lee Wing-chiu, GMSM
- Mr Chow Hon-yum, Alex, GMSM

2005

- Captain Chan Chi-pui, Michael, MBB, GMSM

== Hong Kong ICAC Medal for Meritorious Service (IMS) ==
1998

- Mr Lee Chi-hung, IMS
- Mr Neil Maloney, IMS
- Mr Pang Tad-yan, Paul, IMS

1999

- Mr Tso Wai-yan, Kenny, IMS
- Mr Chow Jun-lung, Carmel, IMS
- Mr Brian John Carroll, IMS

2000

- Mr Hui Kar-man, Ricky, IMS
- Mr Chan Chor-keung, IMS

2001

- Mr Yiu Cheuk-wah, George, IMS
- Mr Cheung Wah-pong, Louis, IMS

2002

- Mr Ng Ping-kwok, IMS
- Mr Wong Kwok-leung, IMS

2003

- Mr James Neil Parkinson, IMS
- Mr WONG Shiu-cheung, Danny, IMS

2004

- Mr Peter Gregory, IMS
- Mr Cheung Chung-tat, Anthony, IMS

2005

- Mr Fok Chi-cheong, IMS
- Mr So Ping-hung, IMS

== Chief Executive's Commendation for Community Service ==
1998

- Mr Man Chen-fai
- Mr Chu Kwan
- Mr Tsui Park-chuen
- Mr Chu Moon-shing
- Mr Ng Ping-kwan
- Mr Ng Ki
- Mr Li King-wah
- Mr Lee Kit-wah, Keith
- Mr Lee Kang-ching
- Ms Lum Bor-mie
- Mr Lam Yan-fook
- Mr Lam Luk-wing Chan Po-king, Betty
- Ms Lam Chui-ling
- Mr Ying Yu-hing
- Mr Keung Shing-cheung
- Mr Miu Wah-chang
- Mr Chan Tai-ki
- Mr Chan Yee-pon
- Mr Leung Chi-pui
- Mr Kwok Chi-hung
- Mr Cheung Ming-hop
- Mr Mak Lam-wing
- Mr Luk Wai-kwok
- Mr Chan Wai-wing
- Ms Sum Yung-ho
- Ms Leung Shun-kam
- Mr Wong Chi-keung
- Mr Tsik Pak-sun
- Mr Wong Kwok-keung
- Mr Wong Kuen-wai, William
- Ms Yeung Sin-hung
- Mr Yeung Woon-ki
- Ms Po Fung-ping
- Ms Cheng Chee-hing, Jane
- Mr Lau Yan-tak
- Mr Tang Ying-kee
- Mr Siu Shing-choi
- Mr Lo Yui-chuen
- Mr Siu Hing-keung
- Mr Chung Man-chai
- Mr Kui Kwok-sing, Sunny
- Mr Lo Keung
- Mr So Bay-hung

1999

- Mr Yu Li-guang
- Mr Wen Choy-bon
- Mr Dong Ki-Kong
- Mr Ho Wing-fat
- Mrs Ho LEE Yok-moy
- Mr Ho Pui-sai, Tony
- Ms Ho King-hung
- Ms Yu Ngar-nei
- Ms Ng Sai-woon
- Mr Ng Kwai-hung
- Ms Lui Lai-bing
- Mr Lee Sing-hong
- Mr Lee Lau-shek
- Miss Lee Cho-ying
- Mr Lee Ning-choun
- Mr Li Yui-kin
- Mr Shen Jin-kang
- Mr Lam Sing-fan
- Mr Hiew Moo-siew
- Ms Yau Mei-ying
- Mr Hung Tenny
- Mr Wu Ting-yau
- Mr Tong Chai-fong
- Mr Tsui Hin-ching
- Mr Yuen Wing-wo
- Mr Cheung Man-ping, Mervyn
- Ms Cheung Yuk-ying
- Mr Cheung Kwok-che
- Mr Cheung Tak-chung, Eric
- Mr Leung Kam-pui
- Mr Mok Kam
- Mr Kwok Yick-hon
- Mr Chan Fong
- Mr Chan Kwai-sang
- Mr Chan Tai-chiu
- Mr Yau Chun-ying
- Mr Wong Man-leung
- Mr Wong Chi-keung
- Mr Wong Kwok-ting
- Mr Yip Tak-lam
- K.Y. Yip
- Mr Liu Chi-keung
- Mr Liu Hon-wo
- Mr Lau Wai-wing
- Mr Lau Chi-fai
- Mr Lu Hin-ki
- Ms Poon Siu-ping, Nancy
- Ms Choi Heung-lin
- Mr Lai Tak-chuen
- Mr Lo Ka-leung
- Ms Tam Shiu-duen, Teresa
- Mr Kwan Fern-hay
- Miss Eeva Liisa Tuulikki Tynkkynen

2000

- Mr Ting Kam-yuen
- Mr Chu Chor-sing, David
- Mr Ho Bat
- Mr Yu Kwan-hing
- Mrs Yu Leung Oi-chun
- Mr Ng Chi-ming
- Dr Alexander Ng
- Mr Lee Hung-sham, Lothar
- Mrs Lee LING Wing-chu
- Mr Li Hon-hung
- Mr Lee Shu-fan, Frank
- Mrs Yuen CHAN Po-hing
- Ms Chau King-ham
- Mr Chow Ming
- Mr Chow Kam-cheung
- Mr Hung Bing
- Mr Heung Ping-lam
- Mrs Au Ning, Lucy
- Mr Cheung Chi-wah
- Mr Leung Ho-kwan
- Mr Leung Chiu-shing
- Mr Malcolm B. Begbie
- Mr Chan Lee-shing
- Ms Chan Kun-ling
- Mr Chan Kit-wai
- Mr Chan Yuen-sum, Sumly
- Mr Chan Kwong-ho
- Mr Chan Shu-yung
- Mr Chan Shu-wah
- Mr Chan Yiu-wah
- Mr Mak Kwok-kit
- Ms Mak Lai-hung, Kitty
- Mr Tsang Yan-fat
- Mr Twang Cheung-wing
- Ms Wong Yuk-shan, San
- Ms Wong Pik-kiu
- Mr Wong Chak-piu, Philip
- Mr Wong Yiu-wah
- Mr Yeung Chiu-ming
- Mr Yeung Hok-ming, David
- Mr Yip Man
- Mr Yip Yiu-chung
- Ms Lau Shui-chi
- Ms Au YEUNG Po-chun
- Mr Choy Wai-lam
- Miss Cheng Wai-hing
- Mr Tang Chee-shing
- Miss Lo Pui-chun
- Mr Kwong Yiu-wah
- Mr So Chung-ping
- Mr So Wa-wai
- Dr So Kwan-tong
- Ms So Oi-kwan

2001

- Ms Fong Mee-kiu
- Mr Ng Siu-cheung
- Mr Chu Lap-pun
- Miss Yu Lai-fan
- Ms Ng Fung-ching
- Mr Shum Tung
- Mr Lee Chi-kwong
- Mr Lee Wai-wing, Derek
- Ms Li Fai
- Ms Li Lin
- Mr Chow Yiu-wing
- Mr Lam Chong-kee
- Mr LamChiu-kuen
- Mr Hou Chun-kau
- Mr Graham Smith
- Mr Wu Man-ming
- Mr Ling Kin-chun
- Mr Ma Kam-wah, Timothy
- Mrs Leung TAM Wo-ping
- Mr Hui Wing-ho
- Mr Hui Chiu-fai
- Miss Chan Ming-yee, Nancy
- Mr Chan Ming-yiu, Samson
- Mr Chan Chun-kwan
- Ms Chan Lai-sheung
- Mr To Sheck-yuen
- Mrs Pang SO Lai-yung
- Mr Tsang Kui-woon
- Mr Fung Man-kit
- Mr Wong Siu-kwan
- Sister Wong May-may
- Ms Yeung Kin-tong
- Mr Yip Lun-ming
- Mr Liu Keung
- Mr Poon Sai-cheung
- Mr Poon Kin-lui
- Mr Choi Yuk-kwan, Tony
- Mr Choi Chi-man
- Mr Lo Pak-leung
- Mr Siu Sue-kwei
- Mr Lo Sai-kwong
- Ms Tam Wai-chun
- Mr Yim Tin-sang

2002

- Mr Kwu Hon-keung
- Mr Chu Chun-yin, Benny
- Mr Ho Hin-ming
- Mr Chow Kam-siu, Joseph
- Ms Lam Yuk-chun
- Mr Lam Chiu-lun
- Mr Lam Kit-sing
- Mr Wong Yiu-chung
- Mr Wan Yuet-cheung
- Mr Wai Woon-nam
- Mr On Hing-ying
- Mrs Chu Tang Lai-kuen
- Mr Yiu Wei
- Mrs Lee Chuck Yuk-ping, Marion
- Ms Li Oi-kwan
- Mrs Yuen Lai Lai-bing
- Mrs Cheuk Chung Kwok-yee, Goretti
- Mrs Wat Lai Yuet-ngor
- Mr Chiu Bing-hang
- Mr Lam Hoi-shing
- Mr Yau Kam-ping
- Mr Yuen Ching-bor, Stephen
- Mr Cheung Shiu-yip
- Mr Leung Keung
- Mr Chong Yum-leung
- Ms Hui Fung-nga
- Mr Chan Ka-yun
- Mr Chan Chuen-yik
- Mrs Chan Cheng Mei-chu, Dorothy
- Mr Mak Ping-fai
- Mr Wong Ming-kwong
- Mr Wong Pak-yuen
- Mr Yeung Sui-sang
- Mr Lau Sum-por
- Mr Lau Tak-hing
- Mr Tsoi Chiu-hee
- Ms Cheng Chiu-kuen
- Mr Cheng For
- Ms Tang Siu-chee
- Dr Dai Lok-kwan, David
- Mr Chung Yam-cheung
- Ms Nip Fung-yee
- Mr Kwan Shek-yin
- Mr Yim Yat-chor
- Ms So Sui-fong

2003

- Ms Lee Ying, Robena
- Mr Tsui Fan
- Mr Cheung Yan-hong
- Mr Leung Wai-kuen, Edward
- Mr Hui Kam-shing
- Mr Chan Sze-chung
- Mr Chan King-wong
- Ms Chan Ka-mun, Carmen
- Mr Chan Tak-ming
- Mr Mak Fu-ling
- Mr Wong Hoi-yue
- Mr Wong Kai-ming
- Mr Lo Yuk-fun
- Mr Wan Hing-sheung
- Ms Ng Choy-che, Nora
- Mrs Joanna Chu
- Mr Kong Wai-yeung
- Mr Ho Ping-chiu
- Mr Yu Kon-wing
- Miss Yu Chui-yee
- Mr David Shum
- Professor Shum Kar-ping
- Mr Li Nai-yiu
- Ms Lee Yee-ling
- Mr Lee Hung-tzee
- Mr Chow Chi-cheong
- Mr Chau Kam-piu
- Ms Lam Kam-yung
- Mr Lam Cheung-chi
- Mr Lam Kin-ko
- Mr Lam Fook-chuen
- Mrs Tsui Yu Mui-hing
- Mr Mah Hoon-leong, Alan
- Mrs Ma Lo Yok-ming, Ada
- Mr Leung Kwok-fai
- Mr Leung Kai-wah
- Mr Kwok Ming-wa
- Mr Kwok Kam-moon
- Mr Chan Wing-on
- Mr Chan Kwong-ming
- Mr Chan Che-kwong
- Mr Chan Yim-pui
- Mr Chan Cheung-yee
- Mr Chan Fu-sang
- Mr Chan Yun-kan
- Mr Chan Keng-chau
- Ms Luk Wai-ming, Seraphina
- Mr Tsang Chuen
- Mr Fung Chin-choi
- Mr Wong Chi-fung
- Mr Wong Pui
- Mr Wong Tse-yam
- Ms Wong Yin-lee
- Mr Yeung Kim-wai, Thomas
- Mr Yip Ye-shie
- Mr Ip Seng-chi, Barnabas
- Mr Lau Wing-chuen
- Mr Tsoi Man-yuen
- Mr Lai Wing-hoi, Frederick
- Mr Lo Wan-sing, Vincent
- Mr Lo Wun-chong
- Mr Tam Fook-tin
- Mr Kwan Bun-fong
- Mr So Ka-wing

2004

- Mr Sung Wai-ching
- Ms Lee Wai-king, Starry
- Mr Lam Ka-keung
- Mr Or Chong-shing
- Mr Au Ning-fat, Alfred
- Mr Chan Kok-wah, Ben
- Mr Chan Kwok-kai
- Mr Wong Kin-pan
- Mr Lau Tin-sang
- Mr Lo Sam-shing
- Mr Ting Moon-tin
- Mr Man Yan
- Mr Wong Yam-yin
- Mr Koo Yeung-pong
- Mr Shek Kin-wah
- Mr Ho Hon-man
- Mr Yu Do-sing
- Professor Albert Lee
- Mr Li Pau-tai
- Mr Li Kwok-hung
- Mr Li Kwok-hung
- Mr Lee King-chung
- Mr Chau Sui
- Mr Chu Chiu-san
- Ms Lam Siu-ling
- Mr Lam Wai-biu
- Mr Lam Ming-sum
- Mr Yew Ka-on
- Mr Paul Ashley Keylock
- Ms Au Yim-lung, Lilianna
- Mr Cheung Chi-wing
- Mr Peter Chung
- Mr Cheung Chun-bun
- Mr Cheung Kin-yan
- Mr Leung Kai-ming
- Mr Leung Kam-wa
- Mr Fu Shu-keung
- Ms Kwok Chi-ying
- Ms Chan Siu-chu
- Mr Chan Ping
- Mr Chan Chi-chiu, Henry
- Mr Chan Chee-wing, Steven
- Ms Chan Pui-chun
- Mr Chan Kam-chiu
- Mr Chan Kin
- Mr Luk Keung
- Mr Fu Lark-tong
- Mr Tsang Kin-ping
- Mr Tsang Kwok-keung
- Mr Tsang Kam-ming
- Mr Wong Sui-kwong, Luke
- Ms Wong Loi-tai
- Mr Wong Chit-man
- Mr Wong Wai-chung
- Mr Wong Yiu-wing
- Mr Wan Wah-on
- Mr Lui Tak-hung
- Mr Liu Chi-leung
- Mr Lau Hak-kai
- Mr Lau King-for
- Mr Lau Ming-ki
- Mr Lou Cheuk-wing
- Mr Pun Kwok-wah
- Mr Cheng Ting-foo
- Mr Tang Siu-fai
- Mr Tang Hoi-tung
- Mr Tang Shek-ching
- Mr Lai Tak-shing
- Mr Kwong Kam-wing
- Mrs Lo Ma Lai-wah
- Mr Tam Yat-yuk
- Mr Tam Shiu-wah
- Ms Ta Lai-kuen
- Mr So Chi-ki
- Mrs Pushpa Gurung

2005

- Mr Chow Yiu-ming, Alan
- Mr Lam Faat-kang
- Ms To Kwai-ying
- Miss Mak Mei-kuen, Alice
- Ms Fung Mei-wan
- Mr Lai Siu-tong, Andy
- Ms Lung Shui-hing
- Reverend Man Chi-on, Steve
- Miss Wong Wai-fun, Fermi
- Mr Ng Kwok-chun
- Ms Lui Fung-ming
- Mr Li Kwok-wah
- Mr Lee Tak-kuen
- Mr Lin Siu-sau
- Mr Lam Kwok-keung
- Mr Yiu Ka-wan
- Mr Yuen Kwai-choi
- Ms Shalini Mahtani
- Mr Cheung Yik-kam
- Dr Cheung Tat-leung
- Mr Leung Yuk-wing
- Mr Leung Kam-ming
- Ms Leung Yim-fan, Cannie
- Ms Hui So-shan
- Mr Kwok Wing-keung
- Dr Richard Tan
- Mr Chan Hak-kan
- Ms Chan Sau-yin
- Mr Chan Mou-keung, Haydn
- Mr Chan Shiu-kuen
- Mr Chan Cheung
- Miss Chan Yui-chong
- Mr Chan Kuen-kwan
- Mr Mak Chi-yan
- Ms Fong Choi-peng
- Mr Wong Yao-wing, Robert
- Mr Wong Wai-suen
- Ms Wong Lam-chun
- Mr Wan Kwok-hung, Joseph
- Mr Yip Chung-ling
- Mr Yip Chun-keung
- Dr iP Wai-cheung
- Ms Poon Wan-tak
- Miss Lai Wai-ling
- Mr Siu Pui-yau
- Dr Chien Ping, Eric
- Ms Kung Wai-hang

== Chief Executive's Commendation for Government/Public Service ==
1998

- Mr Li Wan-suen, Clement
- Mr Lee Ming-kwai
- Ms Lee Mei-mei
- Mr Ho Ka-ming, Roman
- Mr Li Kin-cheung, Edward
- Mr Ng Wai-cheong
- Mr Lam Sui-lung, Stephen, JP
- Mr Heung Sai-ho, Simon
- Mr Yu Chak-ting
- Miss Tong Yuen-fun
- Mr Chan Hau-wai, John
- Mr Chan Yung-suen
- Mr Cheung Wan-ching, Clement
- Mr Wong Wing-hang
- Mr Wong Shut-yung
- Mr Wong Hung-chiu, Raymond, JP
- Mr Liu Chun-sang
- Mr Chak Hoi-leung
- Mr Tang Man-bun
- Mrs Lau Lee Lai-kuen, Shelley, JP
- Mr Tsoi Tak-man
- Mr Law Siu-hing
- Captain Andrew Raeside Robertson
- Mrs Tam Lo Nam-wah, Ella

1999

- Mrs Kiang Wong Kin-fan
- Mr Yu Chun-cheong, Ricky
- Miss Ng Man-wah, Pauline
- Mr Lee Lap-sun, JP
- Mr Ma Chi-kin
- Mr Leung Pui-kong, Peter
- Mr Leung Ka-ming
- Mr Leung Woon-yin
- Ms Mary Kwok
- Mr Shum Hin-man
- Mr Wan Shun-leung, Henry
- Mr Anthony Alan Godfrey
- Mr Chiu Hon-bun
- Mr Poon Chak-fai
- Mr Cheng Kwok-keung, Vincent
- Miss Cheng Wai-fung, Winnie
- Mr Tang Kam-moon

2000

- Mr Pit Dick-wah
- Mr Ng Wai-keung
- Mr Lui Kwok-fai
- Mr Lee Mui-lam
- Mr Chau Hung-on
- Mr Lam Man-wah
- Mr Michael Leslie Squires
- Captain Trevor Keith Marshall
- Mr Leung Fee-ling
- Mr Kwok Chor-ngar
- Mr Chan Kwok-leung
- Mr Chan Kwok-keung
- Mr Chan Kwong-man
- Mr Luk Ho-sang
- Mr Tsang Yuk-ming
- Mr Tsang Wan-hing
- Mr Ching Yu-tuen
- Mr Wong Chee-ying
- Mr Wong Kam-sui
- Mr Wong Chun-ming
- Mr Wong Shing-chak
- Mr Yip Kwai-sun
- Mr Chim Sin-fai
- Mr Chow Hon-ching
- Mrs Lau Chan Yuk-lin, Eliza
- Mrs Cheng Lee Wai-lin, Victoria
- Mr Tang Wing-keung
- Miss Lai Fung-har, Nancy
- Mr Tam Shiu-hang
- Mr Chow Chuk-yuk, Justin
- Mr Chan Chi-san
- Mr Choi Yue-ning
- Mr Tam Kwok-ming
- Mr Kong Yiu-ming

2001

- Miss Wong Hang-yee
- Mr Ho Kam-ching
- Mr Yu Kwok-ping, Ronny
- Mr Lam Kin-yee
- Mr Cho Wing-kin
- Mr Kwok Shing-pui, Eddy
- Ms Chan Pui-kan, Margaret
- Mr Chan Hok-sheung
- Mr Chan Kam-lun
- Mr Tsang Lin, Reynold
- Mr Wong Chiu-foon
- Mr Liu Chi-keung
- Ms Choi Chow-kwai
- Mr Lai Kwok-ming
- Mr Law Wai-fung
- Mr Tam Ki-chu
- Mrs Kwan Chong Lai-yu, Connie

2002

- Mr Fong Man-ching
- Mr Wong Ping-nam, Jimmy
- Mr Chu Bik-leung, Andrew
- Mr Ho Yuet-ming
- Ms Ng Chui-yi
- Mr Li Siu-hing
- Mr Chow Hing-chiu
- Mr Yau Wai-keung
- Mr Chan Kung-lok
- Mr Chan Chi-man
- Mr Chan Wai-man
- Mr Chan Hon-kin
- Mrs Lo Kwan So-ha
- Mr Wong Kit-nang
- Mr Wong Shu-kun
- Mr Wong Kam-tong
- Mr Lau Chun-keung
- Mr Lau Shiu-hong
- Mr Tang Ka-kwong
- Mr Chin Tsang-kung
- Mr Tai Yu-kwong
- Mr Tse Kwok-hung
- Mr Law Kam-wing
- Mr Kwan Tin-lung
- Mr Yim Kwok-ching, Timothy

2003

- Mrs Lo Ku Ka-lee, Clarie, JP
- Mr Cheng Ka-wah, MBB
- Mr Lau Chi-keung, PMSM
- Mr Chan Yung-suen
- Mr Ng Man-kim
- Mr Ng Ka-wing
- Mr Lee Shiu-fat
- Mr Lam Kwok-on
- Mr Lam Wah-yuk
- Mr Kee Kam-por
- Mr Ki Tak-sun
- Mr Yuen Kam-wong
- Ms Cheung Yuk-wah, Emily
- Miss Cheung Woon-yee
- Mr Leung Kam-shing
- Ms Leung Fung-ying, Frances
- Mr Hui So-ho
- Captain Chan Shu-kei, Marcus
- Ms Poh Ying-chu
- Mr Fung Yui-sang
- Mr Yong Sang-chang
- Mr Chak Pui-yan
- Mrs Tse MOK Cho-yin
- Mr Chung Pui-sum
- Mr Tam Po-wah

2004

- Captain Tang Pui-tung, MBB
- Dr Wong Man-ha, Monica
- Mr Ku Chi-chung, Damien
- Mr Ng Kwok-keung
- Mr Ho Chi-keung, Albert
- Mrs Ho LAM Yin-yee
- Ms Yu Yuk-siu, Loretta
- Mrs Yu KWAN Chui-man, Jenny
- Miss Ng Yau-lan, Ada
- Captain Ng Chi-wah, Michael
- Mr Ng Kam-chiu
- Ms Lee Oi-kin
- Captain Shum Chi-wai, Calvin
- Mr Chow Kwing-yiu
- Mr Lim Leung-ban
- Mr Lam Leung-chau
- Ms Alison Cabrelli
- Ms Sin Lan-kwai, Sophia
- Mrs Yuen Kwong Sau-yee, Cecilia
- Mr Ko Wing-cheung
- Dr Au Tak-kwong
- Mr Cheung Kam-pui
- Mr Leung Koon-hung
- Miss Leung Suk-ping, Christina
- Mr Chan Siu-kei
- Mr Chan Wai-keung
- Mrs Chan Yuen Po-yee, Pauline
- Dr Stephen Gowan Chandler
- Mr Chan Yum-hei, Ernest
- Dr Chan Yiu-wing
- Ms Lo Yuet-yee
- Dr Tsang Chiu-yee, Luke
- Dr Tsang Ho-fai, Thomas
- Mr Wong Doon-yee, Charles
- Mr Wong Tang-kin, Kennedy
- Mr Yeung King-chi, Denny
- Mr Yip Chee-kuen
- Mr Au Yin-shan
- Mr Choi Shu-ki
- Mr Cheng Wing-tat
- Mr Tang Pak-biu
- Mr Tang Lung-wah, Edward
- Mr Lai Chak-lam
- Mrs Lu Chan Ching-chuen
- Mr Sit Siu-fung
- Mr Kan Chi-fai
- Mr Ngai Wang-sang
- Mr Kwong Siu-cheung
- Mr Law Ming-wai

2005

- Mr Ng Wai-ping
- Mr Lui Kwok-ming
- Ms Li Hoi-yan, Anita
- Mr Lee To-lung, Laurence
- Miss Yiu Yun-siu
- Mr Or Shi-hung
- Miss Tong Po-hoi, Linda
- Mr Yuen Wing-chun
- Mr Cheung Tze-leung
- Mr Leung Chiu-pun
- Mrs Kwok Lam Yee-kwan, Helen
- Ms Lo Pik-wai, Yvonne
- Mr Fung Chow-kwei
- Ms Wong Yuet-ngor, Anne Marie
- Ms Yeung Tsui-har
- Mr Ip Tin-sung
- Mr Yip Ka-fai, Daniel
- Mr Choi Wing-cheong
- Mr Chung Shui-pang
- Mrs Chung Tsui Soo-ying
- Mr Pong Kam-loi
- Mr Law Bing-ching
- Mr Kwan Kam-fai
- Mr So Hok-lai
