= Mahtani (Sindh) =

Village in Sindh, Pakistan

Mahtani Sindhi: مھتاڻي Urdu: مہتانی
- Village
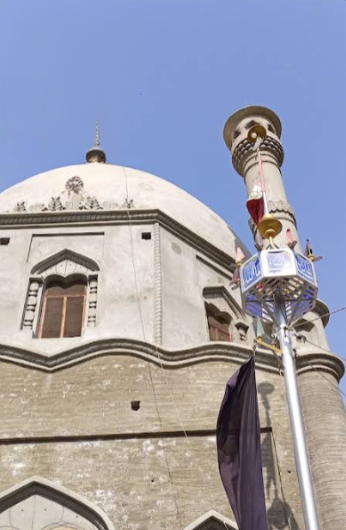
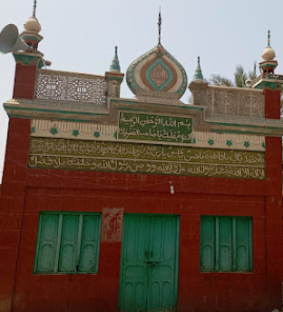
- Top: Dargah Hazrat Syed Gulab Shah Bukhari; Bottom: Jamia Masjid Ahle Tashee, Mahtani

- Location in Sindh, Pakistan Mahtani (Pakistan)
- Coordinates: 27.4194°N 68.3780°E
- Country: Pakistan
- Province: Sindh
- Division: Sukkur
- District: Khairpur
- Tehsil: Gambat
- Union Council: Agra, Sindh

Government
  - Type: Union Council

Population (2017)
  - Total: 1,500
- Time zone: UTC+5 (PST)

Mahtani (Urdu: مہتانی) is a village in Taluka Gambat, Khairpur District, Sindh, Pakistan. It has an estimated population of around 1,500 people. It is administratively part of Gambat Tehsil, which includes various rural settlements.

== Languages ==
The predominant languages spoken in Mahtani are Sindhi and Saraiki, reflecting the region's linguistic heritage and cultural affiliations.

== Religion ==
Mahtani is home to the Dargah of Hazrat Syed Gulab Shah Bukhari and a central Imambargah, both serving as important religious and communal sites for the local Muslim population.

== Agriculture ==
The local economy is primarily based on agriculture, with key crops including cotton, sugarcane, wheat, rice, and sesame.

== See also ==
- Agra, Sindh
- Gambat Tehsil
- Khairpur District
- Sukkur Division
