= Agra (surname) =

Agra is a Galician and Portuguese surname, most frequently found in Brazil and the Rías Baixas area of Spain. Notable people with the surname include:

- Alberto Agra (born 1963), Filipino former acting Secretary of Justice
- Alfonso Agra (born 1959), Spanish actor
- Bruno Agra (born 1980), Brazilian musician
- Carmen Agra Deedy, Cuban-American children's author
- Maria de Fátima Agra (born 1952), Brazilian botanist
- Nélson Agra (born 1991), Portuguese footballer
- Salvador Agra (born 1991), Portuguese footballer
