= Agora Center =

One of the Jyväskylä University institute, Finland

Coordinates: 62°13′55.47″N 25°44′12.42″E

The Agora Center is a separate institute at the University of Jyväskylä in Central Finland. By its nature, the Agora Center is interdisciplinary and networked. Its purpose is to conduct, coordinate, and administrate top-level research and development that relates to the knowledge society and which places emphasis on the human perspective. The research and development is conducted in the form of fixed-period projects in cooperation with the University of Jyväskylä’s other faculties and separate institutes, businesses, the public sector and other relevant parties. The Agora Center also promotes researcher training through its various research projects. One of the core missions of the Agora Center is to effectively combine research and development with education. The project staff includes a high number of students and post-graduate students.

The Research in the Agora Center is mainly based on Human Technology. Human Technology refers to the human-centred approach to technological systems and methods that takes into account human needs and requirements as well as its implications for humans.

The Agora Center’s administration model follows the requirements of being a separate institute of the University of Jyväskylä and the needs for networking in addition to their departmental commitments and activities. The Agora Center has an interdisciplinary Managing Board, on which all of the faculties of the University of Jyväskylä are represented. The Agora Center also has an international Advisory Board.

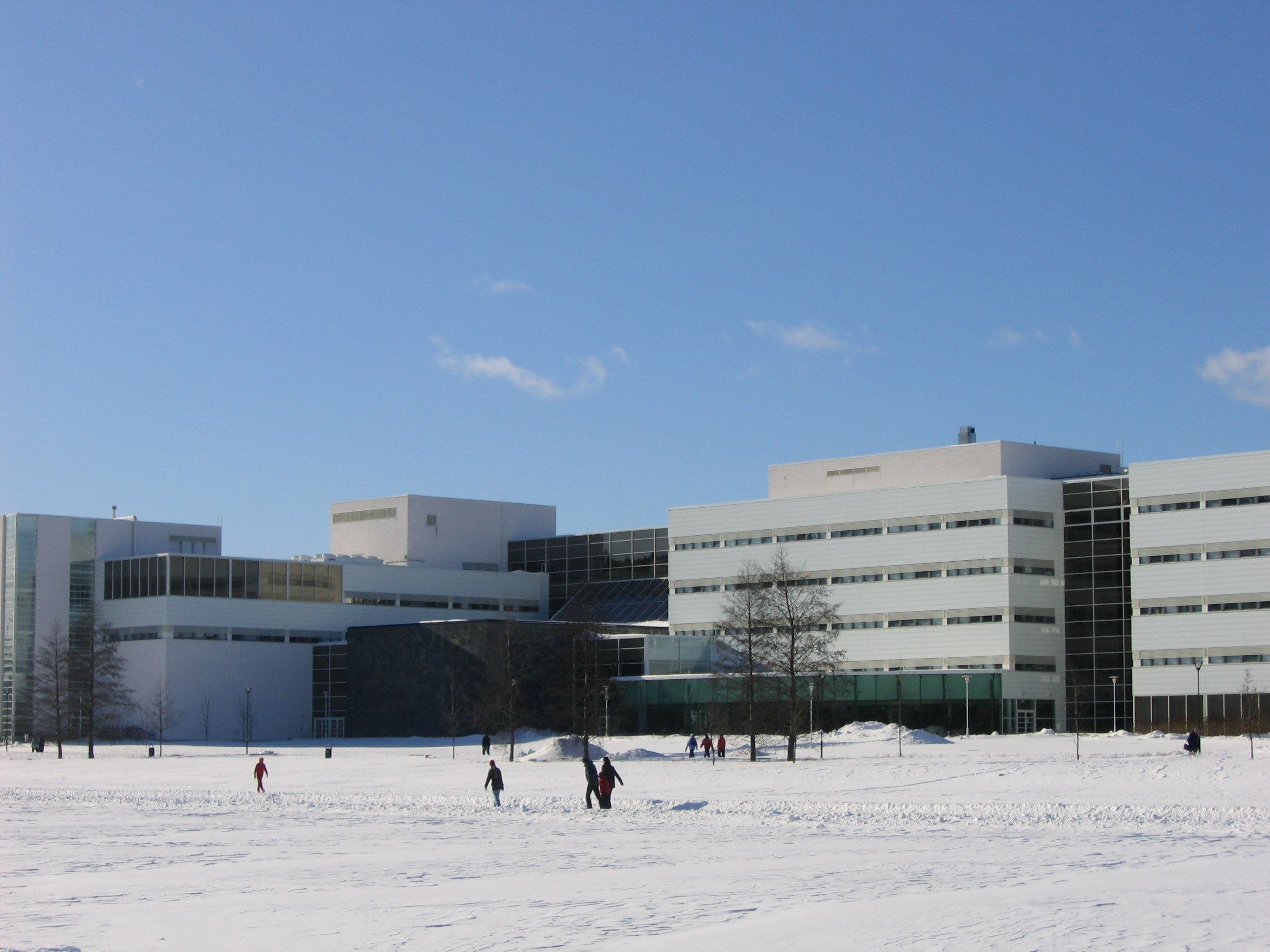
Agora in winter

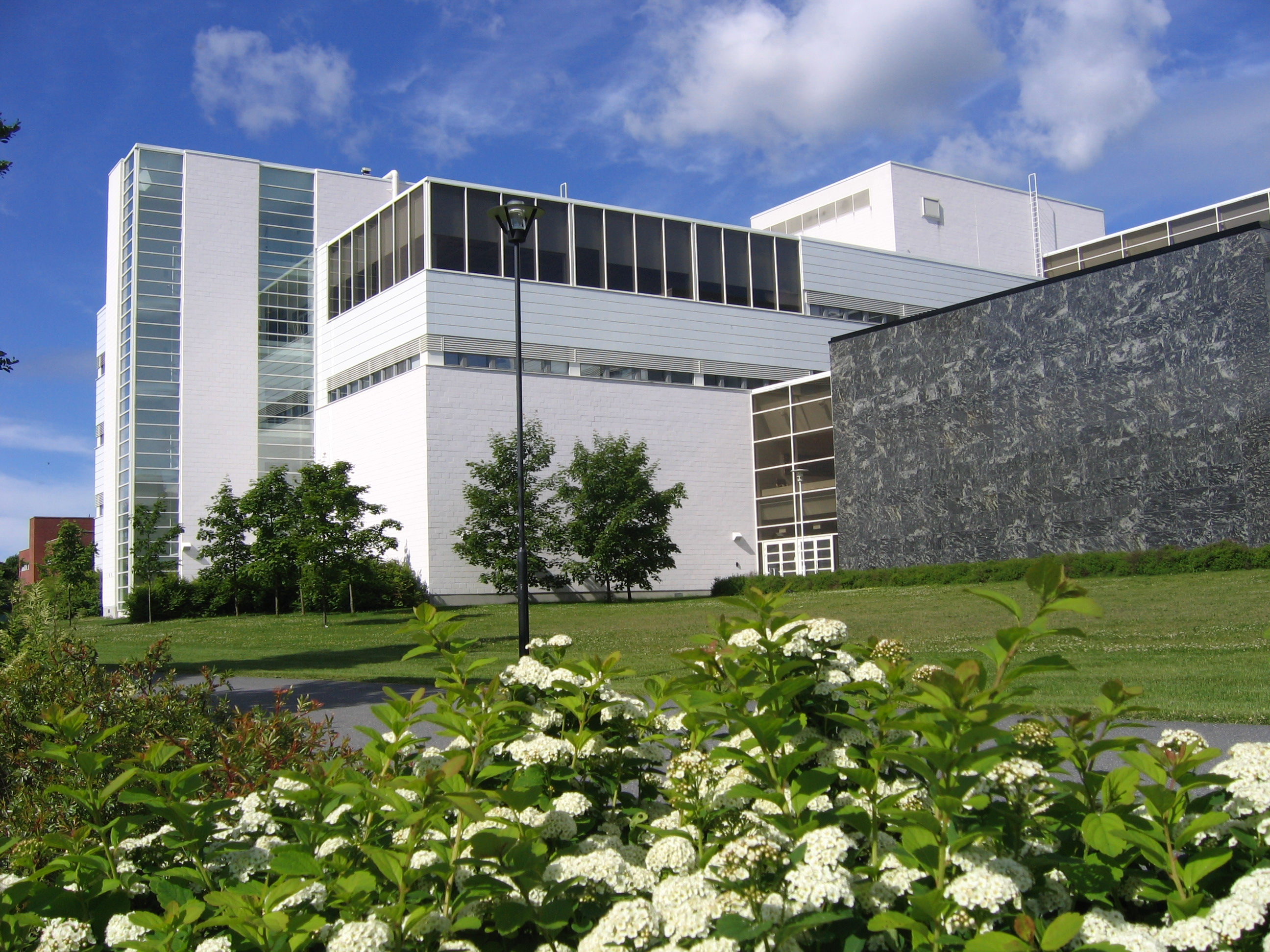
Agora in summer

== History ==
In order to enable growth of Human Tech research, the facilities of the Agora Human Technology Center were built in 2000. The University simultaneously created the Faculty of Information Technology, combining the Department of Computer Science and Information Systems, the Department of Mathematical Information Technology and the Information Technology Research Institute. The faculty plays the main role in technological research within the Agora concept.

The other essential side of the Agora concept is constituted by the human and social sciences. From the beginning it was evident that to study human technology, an interdisciplinary approach was needed. The networked activity started in the form of the Psykocenter in 2000. In the initial period of the Center’s history, the network was associated with the Centre of Excellence in Psychology in order to coordinate the human-centered research related to the knowledge society.

However, it soon became clear that for the intended interdisciplinary research to function, the research operations needed an independent entity with its own, in other words autonomous, administration. Thus, in 2002, the University of Jyväskylä established the Agora Center as a separate institute that also included the Psykocenter. The Agora Center’s first operating period was from 1.2.2002 to 31.7.2005. Nonetheless, in April 2004, the lifespan of Agora Center was extended to the year 2009.

In order to support the functioning and networking of the Agora Center’s interdisciplinary research environments, the Agora Center takes various forms of action. For example, it promotes researcher training and university education, supports researchers in managing interdisciplinary projects, holds open events and forums for multiple disciplines and sectors of society, surveys and promotes the wellbeing of its personnel and conducts Public Relations exercises.

== Laboratories ==
The research and development activities in the Agora Center are carried out in interdisciplinary environments called laboratories. Each of them concentrates on a specific research area. The laboratories offer the environment for versatile research projects.

=== Mind Tech Laboratory ===
The Agora Mind Tech Laboratory develops and applies technology for the study of the human mind. Its objectives and strengths are to be found in the way it combines scientific and technological expertise in the fields of psychophysiological measurement and mathematical information technologies. The three major themes of the laboratory are learning, the evaluation of skills, and the neurological basis of perception. Central applications for this research are the treatment of dyslexia and the intensive training of language skills.

The laboratory utilizes fields such as psychology, information technology, statistics, and cognitive neuroscience. All research projects involve several international researchers and extensive cooperative networks.

=== Learning Laboratory ===
The Agora Learning Laboratory’s (ALL) multidisciplinary research center explores the use of virtual learning environments, knowledge in designing powerful new learning environments, pedagogical innovations, evaluation methods for e-learning purposes, and knowledge management. ALL works collaboratively with the Institute for Educational Research. The contexts of the ALL research projects transcend curricula areas, levels of education, and work organizations, with the primary aim of developing e-learning models. Collaboration between the basic research conducted at the University of Jyväskylä and its practical application in educational and business organizations is highly valued. This integration of high-level scientific knowledge, pedagogical expertise, and product development know-how facilitates the rapid transfer of knowledge into meeting the needs of societies.

=== Game Laboratory ===
The multidisciplinary Agora Game Laboratory (AGL) focuses on the design, development, and research of digital games. The AGL offers an open forum for students, researchers, and others who are interested in games and gaming. Its multidisciplinary expertise covers such areas as educational sciences, computer science, mathematical information technology, and psychology. The research unit designs and studies both serious and entertainment games. Its strengths lie in the game-like learning environments and user-centered game design in which future users (e.g. children, young people, adults, elderly) actively participate in the design process. The laboratory also serves as a network for other actors in the field, and thus forms a link between the University, other game research networks, and businesses.

=== Industrial IT – tutkimus ===
The Agora Industrial IT Group organizes innovative interdisciplinary research and development in the area of information and communication technologies. It aims to advance the technological know-how of networked global industries. As the focus of global markets move more from products to services, businesses and industries require new, human-centered solutions based in information technology. The goal is to develop innovations that arise from international research cooperation, and to transfer new technology into the business world. The strengths of the group are scientific computation and optimization, and, by extension, solutions to support production and logistics in businesses’ product design. In addition to the technological applications, the projects emphasize developing the human resources and business competitiveness and attend to the role of the person as the user of technology. The group collaborates closely with public sector organizations.

=== User Psychology Laboratory ===
The Agora User Psychology Laboratory investigates the behavior of the user with technologies and services in various types of interactive situations. The models of user behavior are significantly valuable in, for example, for device and software design, in education and training, and in industrial R&D processes. Basic research, as well as usability analyses of companies’ products and services, is conducted in the laboratory. Applications can be found in wide areas of human activity. Examples of research topics include mobile services, e-learning, agent technologies, ubiquitous computing, vehicle–driver interaction, surgery simulation, emotional computing and mobile social networks. At the core of the research in the laboratory is a holistic view of the user. Subsequently, the research must be multidisciplinary. The laboratory’s researchers come from the fields of cognitive science, information systems, education, psychology, and art research.

=== Virtual Environment Center ===
The Agora Virtual Environment Center (AVEC) conducts research in the fields of computer graphics and virtual reality. It also offers visualisation and graphics programming services to various departments within the University of Jyväskylä and to companies. AVEC also arranges seminars and lecture courses. The foci of AVEC are virtual reality applications, interactions in virtual environments, and programming architectures for virtual reality applications. When selecting and implementing research topics, AVEC’s management emphasizes issues that have technical, financial, and/or scientific significance. The topics also develop the use of virtual reality visualization in both research and industry. Virtual reality visualization can be used to improve understanding of complex structures and phenomena. For example, a virtual prototype can reduce the amount of time an industry invests in the product development cycle, and a simulated model of a product can be built and tested in a virtual environment. Virtual reality simulations can significantly improve a product’s quality and functionality.

=== Innoroad Laboratory ===
The Agora Innoroad Laboratory serves as a forum for international cooperation and regional collaboration in multidisciplinary research on road traffic and other driver and transportation-related issues. The Lab’s key strengths include the modeling, optimization, and application of ICT tools in traffic and transportation, as well as research in predicting human error. Among the projects ongoing in the lab is research funded by the Research Council of Norway on optimising newspaper delivery and waste collection, and the development of new optimization tools for communal logistic applications, funded by the KAKS foundation. A driving simulator is used to study people’s driving skills and what they do under various circumstances. This device also provides training and evaluation for professionals for whom driving is an essential element, such as the drivers of emergency vehicles. The simulator also provides opportunities to evaluate the driving skills of, for instance, old and young drivers, and to develop innovations and new products that enhance driving, traffic, and transportation systems.

=== Service Sciences Laboratory ===
Services science is an interdisciplinary field that seeks to bring together knowledge from diverse areas to improve the service operations, performance, and innovation within industry and the public sector. In essence, it represents a melding of technology with an understanding of human behavior and thinking, as well as business processes and organization. With methods such as scientific computing, overall IT-expertise and knowledge on human behavior, the Agora Service Sciences Laboratory aims at creating new service solutions that can range, for instance, from new applications, better understanding of the research subject or new improved operations models to enhanced logistical structures. Much of the research done in the Service Sciences Laboratory has been related to promoting health care and wellbeing of people through an interdisciplinary and multi-partner approach. The experts at the Agora Center have collaborated tightly across disciplines with each other, the end-users, and other partners to create new innovative solutions to enhance the operations of social and health care services. For example, in the conducted NOVA-project the operations of an emergency duty clinic of Central Finland Health Care District have been enhanced through ICT-based simulations targeting the basic and special health care processes and structure, health care economics, and quality of the activities. The successfully met aim was to speed up the patient’s treatment process from the diagnosing phase to the ward.

== International Acknowledge 2005–2007 ==
- Internationally Awarded Breakthroughs in Research:
  - Society for Research in Child Development and International Society for the Study of Behavioural Development, awarded to professor Lea Pulkkinen
  - Philips Nordic Prize, awarded to professor Heikki Lyytinen
  - Czech Academy Bernard Bolzano Honorary Medal, awarded to Pekka Neittaanmäki
- Several Internationally Funded Projects, EU: Marie Curie Excellence Team among others.
- International Open Access Online Journal Human Technology Human Technology
- The Centre of Excellence, Learning and Motivation, appointed by the Academy of Finland
- Center for Scientific Computing and Optimization in Multidisciplinary Applications SOMA
- Two FiDiPro-professorships
- The Commission and Funding from the Nordic Innovation Centre to coordinate the Nordic Serious Games Development and Research Work.

== See also ==
- University of Jyväskylä
