= Agora (disambiguation) =

Agora is a general name for a public meeting place in ancient Greece.

Agora may also refer to:

== Art and entertainment ==
- Agora (film), a 2009 historical movie about Hypatia of Alexandria
- Agora (sculpture), an art installation by Magdalena Abakanowicz in Chicago's Grant Park
- Agora (Paulinho da Costa album), 1977
- Agora (Fennesz album), 2019
- "Agora" (Bear Hands song), 2014
- "Agora" (María Becerra song), 2024
- Agora São Paulo or Agora, a Brazilian newspaper started in 1999
- Cirkus Agora, a Norwegian travelling circus
- Agora..., the first studio album by Brazilian musician Ivan Lins (1970)
- Agora Trilogy, a fantasy novel trilogy by David Whitley set in the world of Agora

== Brands and enterprises ==
- Agora (online marketplace), an online black market
- Agora SA, a Polish media corporation
- Agora Super Stores, retail superstore in Bangladesh
- Agora Theatre and Ballroom, a concert club in Cleveland, Ohio, US
- Agora, Inc., a network of companies in the publishing, information services, and real estate industries
  - Agora Financial, a subsidiary of The Agora network that publishes books, magazines, newsletters and financial web sites

== Organizations ==
- Agora (organization), a Russian human rights advocacy group
- Agora Center, Jyväskylä, Finland
- Agora Energiewende, a German renewable energy think tank

== Places ==
- Agora (Thrace), an ancient Greek town on the Gallipoli peninsula, Turkey
- Ancient Agora of Athens
- L'Àgora, a multifunctional building in Valencia, Spain
- Agora, the building of the Swiss Cancer Centre, Lausanne
- Agora of İzmir
- Agora du Vieux-Port, Quebec City

== Software ==
- Agora (programming language)
- Agora (web browser), a proof of concept World Wide Web email browser developed in 1994-1997
- Bing Product Upload, a discontinued part of Microsoft's Bing search engine (codename AGORA)

== Other uses ==
- Israeli agora, a unit of currency
- Agora São Paulo or Agora, a Brazilian newspaper started in 1999
- AGORA (Access to Global Online Research in Agriculture) Program, started by the United Nations Food and Agriculture Organization to provide access to scientific information to developing countries
- Asteroidal Gravity Optical and Radar Analysis (AGORA), a proposed space probe to investigate the asteroid Vesta in the 1990s

== See also ==
- Aghora (disambiguation)
- Agorism, a libertarian political philosophy
- Agoura, California, an unincorporated area in Los Angeles County
