= Dom Roque Tello de Menezes =

Portuguese nobleman

Dom Roque Tello de Menezes was a Portuguese nobleman. The villages of Trombay and Chembur in Bombay were granted to him in 1548.
