= Salsette–Trombay Railway =

Defunct transit line in Mumbai, Maharashtra

Overview
- Status: Closed
- Locale: Mumbai
- Termini: Trombay; Andheri
- Stations: 9

Service
- Operator: Great Indian Peninsular Railway

History
- Opened: 1928
- Closed: 1934

Technical
- Line length: 12 km (7.5 mi)
- Track gauge: 1,435 mm (4 ft 8 1/2 in) standard gauge

The Salsette–Trombay Railway (also known as the Central Salsette Tramway) was a standard-gauge railway line on the island of Salsette, in the city of Mumbai (Bombay), India. The line was opened in 1928 by the Great Indian Peninsular Railway under the Bombay Improvement Trust which called for "the opening up of a railway line running West to South-east and linking up the Andheri and Kurla stations to render available for building purposes vast tracts of land sufficiently close to the city." Hence, the line linked Andheri in the north with the village of Trombay in the east. The rail line was about 13 km long. During weekends, the line was frequented by picnickers who used to travel to Trombay to buy toddy or palm liquor.

In 1934, the line was shut to make way for the Santacruz Airport.

== Route ==
The line began on the Island of Trombay and headed west with halts at Wadavali and Mahul Road up to Kurla Jn, where it crossed the main GIPR line. The line continued North-West along what is now S. G. Barve Road to pass under the Old Agra road bridge (now A. H. Wadia Road) to Agra Road station. From here the line headed West along the present C. S. T. Road towards Santacruz with halts at Kolovery and Kole-Kalyan and finally turned north towards Andheri with halts at Sahar and Chakala stations. It station was at Chakala now new hotel at subha zircon.

== Equipment ==
The line operated eight steam engines built in Britain by W. G. Bagnall in 1921 and delivered new to the Salsette Trombay Railway. Most of the locomotives used were returned to Britain after the line was shut.

== See also ==
- Mumbai Suburban Railway
- Andheri railway station
- Line 1 (Mumbai Metro)
