= Kolovery railway station =

Defunct railway station in Maharashtra, India

Kolovery was formerly a station on the Salsette–Trombay Railway. It was dismantled after the rail line closed down in 1934. Kolovery Village lies in the Kalina area of Santacruz (east).
