= Agra, Lombardy =

Agra
- Comune
- Comune di Agra
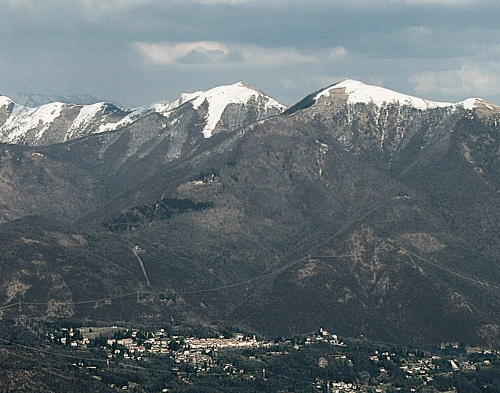
- Agra with Monte Lema in the background

- Coat of arms

- Location of Agra in Italy Agra (Lombardy)
- Coordinates: 45°2′N 08°46′E
- Country: Italy
- Region: Lombardy
- Province: Varese (VA)
- Frazioni: Bedorè, Gaggio, Madonna della Lupera

Government
  - Mayor: Andrea Ballinari, since June 2004

Area
  - Total: 3 km^{2} (1.2 sq mi)
- Elevation: 650 m (2,130 ft)

Population (2001)
  - Total: 370
  - Density: 120/km^{2} (320/sq mi)
- Demonym: Agresi
- Time zone: UTC+1 (CET)
  - Summer (DST): UTC+2 (CEST)
- Postal code: 21010
- Dialing code: 0332

Agra is a town and comune located in the province of Varese, in the Lombardy region of northern Italy.
