= Rodriguésia (journal) =

- Discipline: Botany
- Language: English
- Edited by: Karen Lucia De Toni

Publication details
- History: 1935-present
- Publisher: Rio de Janeiro Botanical Garden (Brazil)
- Frequency: Continuous
- Open access: Yes
- License: CC BY

Standard abbreviations
- ISO 4: Rodriguésia

Indexing
- CODEN: RODRAD
- ISSN: 0370-6583 (print); 2175-7860 (web)
- LCCN: agr37000331
- JSTOR: 03706583
- OCLC no.: 608379668

Links
- Journal homepage; Online archive; Journal page on SciELO

Rodriguésia is a peer-reviewed open-access scientific journal covering all aspects of botany with an emphasis on South America. It was established in 1935 and is published by the Rio de Janeiro Botanical Garden. The editor-in-chief is Karen Lucia De Toni (Rio de Janeiro Botanical Garden).

== Abstracting and indexing ==
The journal is abstracted and indexed in EBSCO databases, Latindex, Referativnyi Zhurnal, and Scopus.
