= Aghora =

Aghora may refer to:

- The Hindu god Bhairava, a form of Shiva
- Aghori, a particular school of Hindu Tantra
- Aghor Yoga, subsect of the Aghora lineage
- Aghora (band), a Floridian progressive metal band
  - Aghora (album), an album by Aghora

== See also ==
- Agora (disambiguation)
