= Agrabad (disambiguation) =

Agrabad is a downtown commercial and financial district in Chittagong, Bangladesh.

Agrabad may also refer to:

- Agrabad Government Colony High School, a high school in south Agrabad, Chittagong
- Agrabad Mohila College, a private women's degree college in Double Mooring Thana, Chittagong
