= Agra Road railway station =

Defunct railway station in Maharashtra, India

Agra Road was a station on the Salsette–Trombay Railway. It was dismantled after the rail line closed down in 1934.

The station lay in the Kurla region of Mumbai, located close to where the Tramway route ( Today's CST Road) intersected the Old Agra Road (currently Lal Bahadur Shastri Marg), close to the Kurla BEST Bus Depot.
