= Agra, Punjab =

Agra آگرہ
- Location within Pakistan
- Coordinates: 30°29′03″N 72°40′44″E
- Country: Pakistan
- Province: Punjab
- District: Sahiwal
- Elevation: 159 m (522 ft)
- Time zone: UTC+5 (PST)

Agra (Urdu, Punjabi: آگرہ) is a village of Sahiwal District in the Punjab province of Pakistan. The nearest city is Chichawatni about 6 kilometres (3.7 mi) to the north.
