= Nordic Innovation =

Nordic Innovation logo

Nordic Innovation is an organization under the Nordic Council of Ministers. They aim to make the Nordics a pioneering region for sustainable growth by promoting entrepreneurship, innovation and competitiveness in Nordic businesses.

Nordic Innovation works with both private and public stakeholders, and has projects and partners in all the Nordic countries.

Nordic Innovation supports the Nordic prime ministers’ vision that the Nordic region will become the most sustainable and integrated region in the world in 2030.

== History ==
=== Nordic Industrial Fund (1973–2004) ===
The Nordic Industrial Fund was established in 1973. The fund was to promote research, innovation and education within the industry of the Nordic Countries. It was administered by the Nordic Council of Ministers. It had two divisions: the Bio & Chemistry division and the Materials Technology and Standardization

The Bio and Chemistry Division managed a number of Nordic research/education/innovation projects under the Nordic Council of Ministers, and in collaboration with national, Nordic, and international communities and governmental agencies. BCD also managed 5 programmes:

- Nordic Wood (1993–1997): A program for the Nordic forestry and wood industry.
- NordFood (1993–2000): A program for the food industry.
- NordPap (1993–1996): A program for the cardboard and pulp industry.
- NordBio (1989–1993): A program for the biotechnology industry.
- NordYeast (1987–1993): A program for the yeast and yeast application industry.

Nordtek, the cooperation organization of the 23 Nordic technical universities was a subdivision of BCD.

The organisation moved to Oslo in 1986.

=== Nordic Innovation Centre (2004–2011) ===
In 2004, the fund was merged with Nordtest, to become known as the Nordic Innovation Centre.

The organisation changed its name to Nordic Innovation in 2011.

=== Nordic Innovation (2011 - ) ===
==== 2018 - 2021 ====
The Cooperation Program for Innovation and Business 2018-2021. Nordic Innovation supported programs and projects which contributed to fulfilling the goals of cooperation program. Nordic Innovation worked through three programs:

- Nordic Smart Mobility and Connectivity
- Nordic Sustainable Business Transformation
- Health, Demography and Quality of Life
