= Milen Manoj Earath =

Indian pianist

Milen Earath
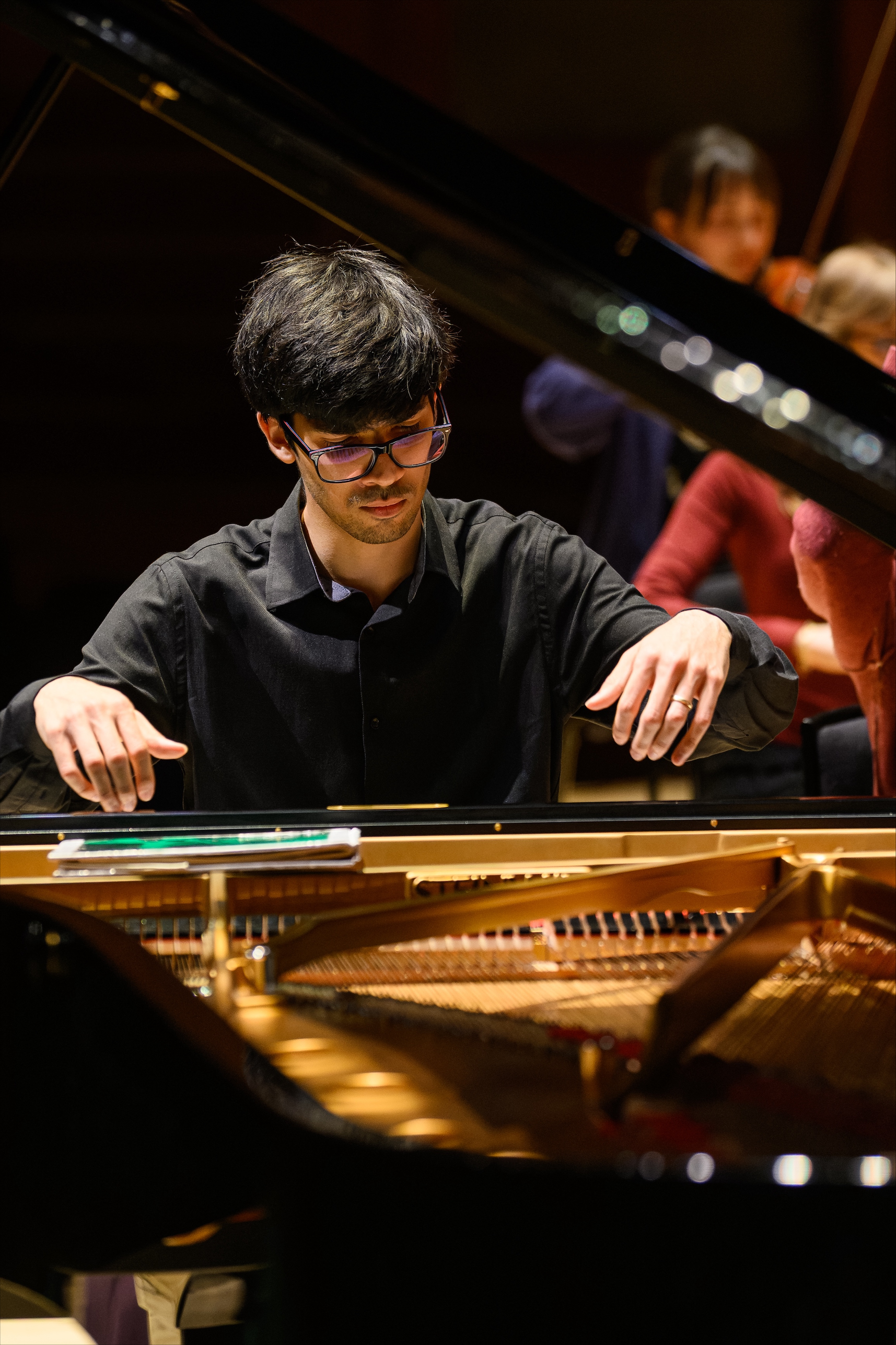
- Milen Earath in 2026 at a concert in the Barbican Hall, London
- Born: October 18, 2001 (age 24); Kerala, India
- Occupation: Pianist
- Parents: Manoj Bhaskaran Earath; Alena Vladimirovna Earath

Milen Earath (born 18 October 2001) is an Indian pianist born in Kerala, India, to an Indian father and a Russian mother. He is a prizewinner at the Cambridge International Piano Competition (2026), a finalist of the Gold Medal of the Guildhall School of Music and Drama, and performed as a soloist at the Barbican Hall with the Guildhall Symphony Orchestra. Earath performed in India, Germany, Russia, Belgium, Italy and the United Kingdom.

== Early life ==
Born in the southern Indian state of Kerala, Earath comes from a family with no musical background. His father Manoj Bhaskaran Earath, an Indian national and mother Alena Vladimirovna Earath, a Russian national, are both doctors.

During his childhood, Earath was interested in sports, kung-fu, and other extra-curricular activities, especially at school. In primary school, Earath won prizes in recitation, elocution and storytelling.

== Education ==
While visiting his grandparents in Russia during his 3rd grade school vacation, Earath attended a concert in a nearby music school, where he first saw and heard a grand piano. In the following two weeks, Earath took piano lessons in that music school, during which he learnt to play Beethoven's Für Elise and Marmot. Upon his return to India, Earath joined a music school in his hometown, Thrissur on June 1, 2010.

In May 2011, Earath started Initial Grade Piano of Trinity College, London. In a span of 1.5 years, by December 2012, he had completed the 8 grades in Pianoforte with distinction. He appeared for Associate of Trinity College, London (ATCL, equivalent in level to the first year of an undergraduate degree) in December 2013 and passed the exam with distinction. In December 2014, he passed Licentiate of Trinity College, London (LTCL, corresponding in level to the final year of an undergraduate degree) with distinction. In January 2015, Earath was certified with Fellowship of Trinity College, London (FTCL, corresponding to a postgraduate course at a conservatoire or university) in Piano Performance. Earath, who is the youngest Indian to achieve this, completed the 8 grades and the 3 diplomas of Trinity College London in 4.5 years, a period considered among the shortest for the qualification.

After Musiquest, he was invited for piano masterclasses by Heribert Koch, president of the European Piano Teachers Association (EPTA), Germany, who kept in touch with him online. Earath has attended many intensive piano masterclasses with Koch since 2014 in Germany. While in India, Earath continued playing mostly by himself and took occasional Skype classes.

In June 2024, Earath completed a five-year Specialist Diploma in Piano Performance with Prof. Tatiana Zelikman at the Gnessin Russian Academy of Music in Moscow, and graduated with first-class honours. He is currently pursuing a Master of Performance at the Guildhall School of Music and Drama in London, studying with Prof. Ronan O'Hora.

== Career ==
=== Domestic ===
Earath's first experience of a piano competition was at age 12 in the 2013 MusiQuest, an all-India piano competition in Pune. He won first place in the advanced division for ages up to 25, winning an acoustic piano and a scholarship for a summer camp in the International Institute for Young Musicians in Kansas.

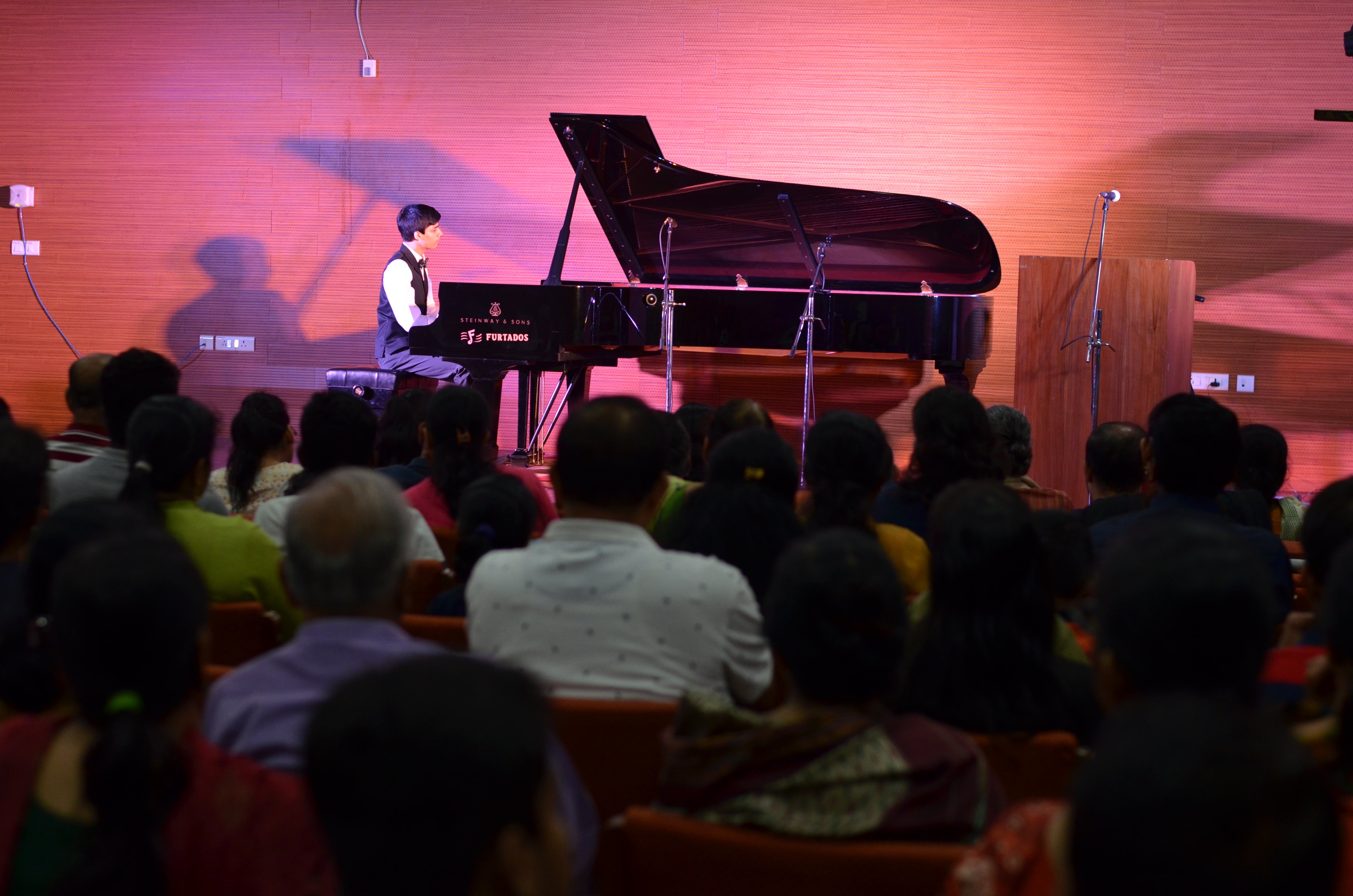
Earath at a piano concert in Anushaktinagar, hosted by the DAE Cultural Centre, 2017.

In 2014, Earath was a semi-finalist and the winner of the "Audience Favorite Prize" at "Conbrio" Mumbai, a national level piano competition for ages up to 35.

His first large-scale solo recital in India was held on April 28, 2017, at the National Centre for Performing Arts in Mumbai.

In July 2017, Earath was awarded Best Child Musician (Male) at the Indywood Film Carnival.

=== International ===
On January 24, 2016, Earath had his first solo recital, held at Schloss Burgau, Germany. His orchestral debut took place in Germany on October 16, 2016, where he performed Mendelssohn's Piano Concerto No. 1 in G minor.

Starting in 2014, Earath had multiple concerts in Germany, Russia, Belgium and Italy.

Earath was awarded the National Child Award for Exceptional Achievements in the Field of Music by President of India Shri. Pranab Mukherjee on November 14, 2016, at Rashtrapati Bhavan.

On November 10, 2017, Earath performed for Queen Mathilde of Belgium, at the Mehli Mehta Music Foundation.

On February 3, 2018, Earath performed Liszt's Piano Concerto No. 2 accompanied by Collegium Musicum Jülich, with conductor Peter Sauerwein at the Gymnasium Zitadelle in Jülich.

Earath was a finalist in the Guildhall School of Music and Drama's 'Beethoven Piano Prize' in 2024 and the ‘Romantic Piano Prize’ in 2025.

In February 2026, he has appeared in recital at South Hill Park Arts Centre as part of the International Conservatoire Series. In April 2026, Earath was awarded Second Prize and the Audience Prize at the Cambridge International Piano Competition.

On 30th April 2026, Earath performed Piano Concerto No. 2 (Prokofiev) with the Guildhall Symphony Orchestra at the Barbican Hall, conducted by Jonathan Bloxham, as part of the Guildhall Gold Medal Final.

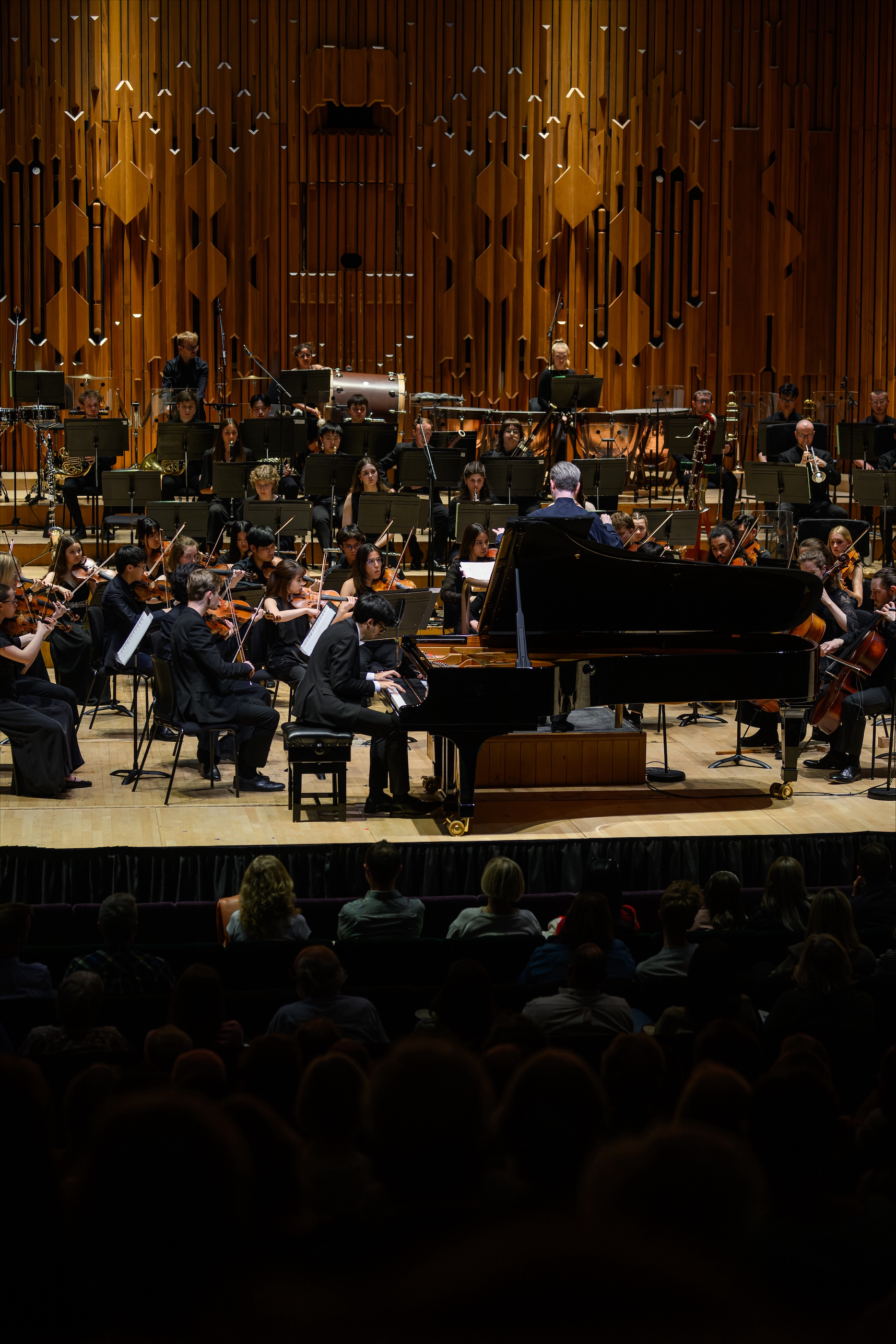
Earath performing at the Barbican Hall, London as part of the Guildhall Gold Medal 2026
