= Agra, Bhopal =

Agra
- village
- Location within Madhya Pradesh Location within India
- Coordinates: 23.61071095°N 77.28066444°E
- Country: India
- State: Madhya Pradesh
- District: Bhopal
- Tehsil: Berasia
- Elevation: 494 m (1,621 ft)

Population (2011)
  - Total: 38
- Time zone: UTC+5:30 (IST)
- ISO 3166 code: MP-IN
- 2011 census code: 482343

Agra is a village in the Bhopal district of Madhya Pradesh, India. It is located in the Berasia tehsil.

== Demographics ==
According to the 2011 census of India, Agra has 9 households. The effective literacy rate (i.e. the literacy rate of population excluding children aged 6 and below) is 33.33%.

Demographics (2011 Census)
	Total	Male	Female
Population	38	14	24
Children aged below 6 years	5	1	4
Scheduled caste	0	0	0
Scheduled tribe	2	1	1
Literates	11	6	5
Workers (all)	21	11	10
Main workers (total)	18	10	8
Main workers: Cultivators	14	8	6
Main workers: Agricultural labourers	4	2	2
Main workers: Household industry workers	0	0	0
Main workers: Other	0	0	0
Marginal workers (total)	3	1	2
Marginal workers: Cultivators	3	1	2
Marginal workers: Agricultural labourers	0	0	0
Marginal workers: Household industry workers	0	0	0
Marginal workers: Others	0	0	0
Non-workers	17	3	14
