= Agra, Sindh =

Agra
- Location within Pakistan
- Coordinates: 27.24°N 68.23°E
- Country: Pakistan
- Province: Sindh
- Elevation: 47 m (154 ft)

Population (2023)
  - Total: 20,222
- Time zone: UTC+5 (PST)

Agra is a town in the Sindh province of Pakistan. It is located in Gambat Tehsil in the Khairpur District of Sukkur Division. It is located on the left bank of the River Indus and right bank of Faiz Nahar. It has a population of around 20,000 people (2023).

== Infrastructure ==
1-Educational institution: GHSS Agra, GHS girls Agra, GBELS Agra, USMANIA MODEL HIGH SCHOOL AGRA

2-Health : Rural Health center Agra affiliated Gambat institute of sciences Gambat (GIMS)

3-DSP office Agra, police station Agra

4-National Bank of Pakistan (branch) Agra

5-Zarai Tarqiyati Bank Agra

5- Model digital phone exchange (PTCL)

6-Connected by Road Larkana, Khairpur, Gambat, and connected via N5 to all over country
