= Trombay =

Suburb of Mumbai, India

- Suburb
- Location in Mumbai, India
- Coordinates: 19.0°N 72.9°E
- Country: India
- State: Maharashtra
- District: Mumbai Suburban
- City: Mumbai

Government
  - Type: Municipal corporation
  - Body: Brihanmumbai Municipal Corporation (MCGM)

Languages
  - Official: Marathi
- Time zone: UTC+05:30 (IST)

Trombay is an eastern suburb of Mumbai (Bombay), India. The Bhabha Atomic Research Centre (BARC) is located there.

== History ==
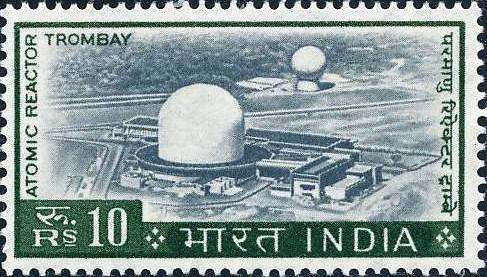
Atomic Reactor Trombay on 1965 stamp of India.

In 1548, Trombay and Chembur were given to Dom Roque Tello de Menezes. The area contains several ruins of Portuguese churches from the 1620s and 1630s.

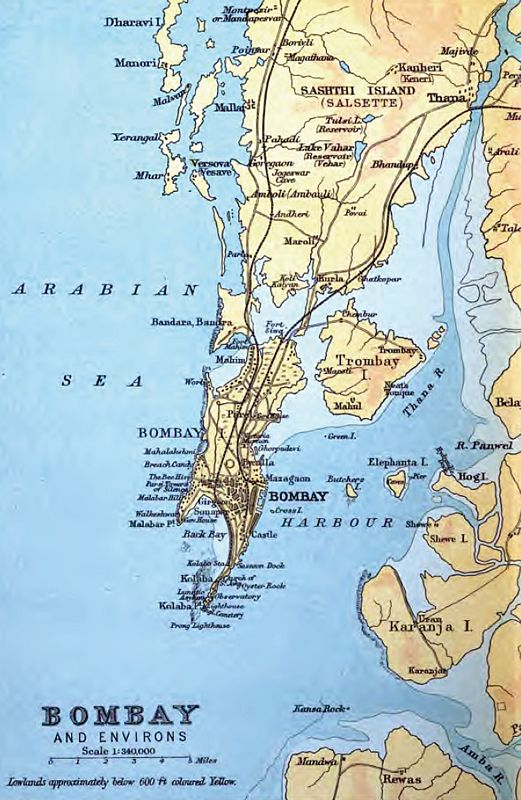
1893 map showing Trombay

In 1928, the Great Indian Peninsular Railway opened the Trombay-Andheri line called the Salsette Trombay Railway or Central Salsette Tramway.

The Bhabha Atomic Research Centre (BARC), originally called the Atomic Energy Establishment, Trombay, was established in Trombay in January 1954.

== See also ==
- Anushakti Nagar
