= Shalini Mahtani =

Founder of Community Business

Shalini Mahtani MBE
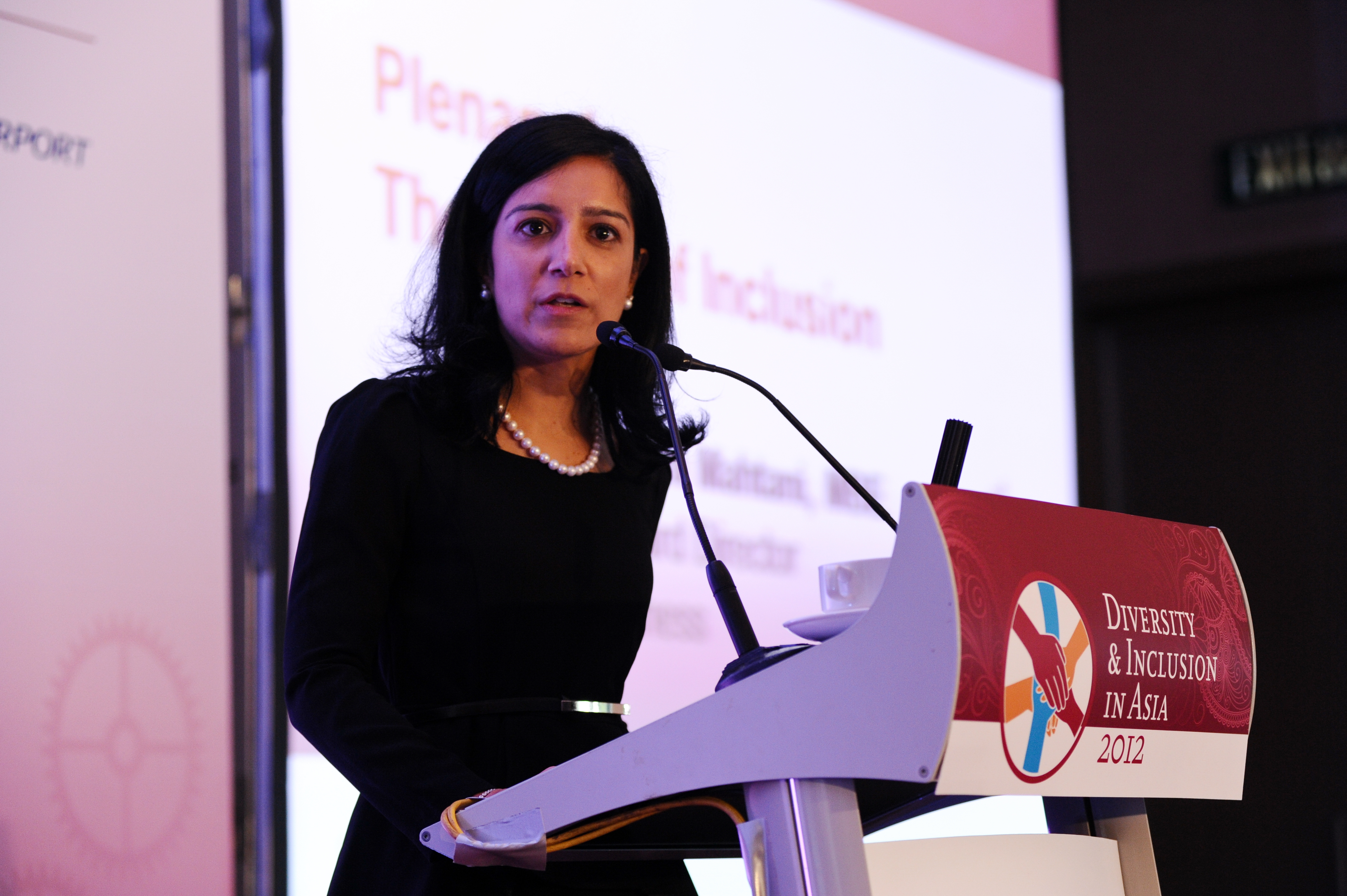
- Speaking at the Diversity & Inclusion in Asia Conference in 2012
- Born: 12 April 1972 (age 54); Hong Kong
- Education: London School of Economics
- Known for: Founder of Community Business, The Zubin Foundation, HospitalAdvisor
- Spouse: Ravi Gidumal

Shalini Mahtani, MBE, (born April 12, 1972) (Chinese: 馬夏邐;Sindhi: شاليني مهتاڻي) is the founder and former chief executive officer (CEO) of Community Business, a non-profit organization dedicated to corporate social responsibility in Asia.

In 2014, Mahtani founded The Zubin Foundation, an independent non-profit organization to raise awareness on social issues in Hong Kong.

Mahtani serves on the board of Community Business, Hong Kong Unison and The University of Hong Kong Career Advisory Board. Mahtani is an appointed member of the Hong Kong SAR Government's Transport Advisory Committee and Business Facilitation and Advisory Committee.

== Personal life ==
Born in 1972 in Hong Kong, of Indian Sindhi heritage, Mahtani is granddaughter of George Harilela, the older brother of Hari Harilela. Mahtani attended Island School in Hong Kong. She graduated from the London School of Economics (1990–1993) in UK and qualified as an accountant with the American Institute of Certified Public Accountants (AICPA) in 1996. Mahtani started her career as an accountant and proceeded to banking before she started working at Community Business.

Mahtani is married to Ravi Gidumal, who lobbied the British Government for full British citizenship for ethnic minorities in Hong Kong prior to British handover.

== Community Business ==
Mahtani is the Founder of Community Business, a non-profit organization based in Hong Kong with a focus on Corporate Social Responsibility.

Mahtani published Women on Boards reports for the Hang Seng Index and the Bombay Stock Exchange. Mahtani has advocated for greater diversity and inclusion across companies in Asia.

From 2006 to 2008, Mahtani was also External Advisor to Bank of America, Merrill Lynch for Asia ex-Japan.

== The Zubin Foundation ==
The Zubin Mahtani Gidumal Foundation Limited (The Zubin Foundation) is a social policy think tank based in Hong Kong. It was founded in 2014 and is a registered charity in Hong Kong (IR 91/12344). The Zubin Foundation focuses on reform in patient care, racial integration and empowering women and girls in Hong Kong.

== HospitalAdvisor ==
HospitalAdvisor is the brainchild of Mahtani. Motivated to make some good come from her son's death, Mahtani created HospitalAdvisor together with the Harvard Global health Institute to empower patients with more information on Hong Kong's hospitals. HospitalAdvisor is a website providing user-generated ratings on all the city's hospitals, public and private. The site, based on a similar concept to that of travel site TripAdvisor, went live on 18 May 2016.

== Awards and recognition ==
- Excellence Award, Indian Association of Hong Kong, 2014
- Master of Charities, Arts and Culture, American Chamber of Commerce in Hong Kong, 2011
- One of the List of Young Global Leaders, World Economic Forum 2009
- Member of the Order of the British Empire (MBE), Her Majesty Queen Elizabeth II, 2008
- 35 under 35, World Business, United Kingdom, 2007
- Asia 21 Fellow, Asia Society, 2007
- Special Commendation for Community Service, Chief Executive of Hong Kong, Donald Tsang, HKSARG Government, 2005
- The Awardee of Hong Kong Humanity Award, 2020
