= Adam Wojciechowski (engineer) =

Polish engienerr and academic

Adam Piotr Wojciechowski
- Title: Professor of Engineering and Technical Sciences

Academic background
- Education: Łódź University of Technology PhD: 2005, Computer Science, Silesian University of Technology Habilitation: 2014, Computer Science, Częstochowa University of Technology

Academic work
- Discipline: Technical Computer Science and Telecommunications
- Institutions: Łódź University of Technology

Adam Piotr Wojciechowski is a Polish engineer and professor of engineering and technical sciences. He is the Vice-Rector for Development at the Łódź University of Technology.

== Education ==
In 1999, Wojciechowski graduated from the Faculty of Technical Physics, Information Technology and Applied Mathematics at the Łódź University of Technology, earning, earning a Master of Science degree in Computer Science. In 2005, he obtained a PhD in Computer Science, specializing in Computer Graphics and Computer Vision, from the Faculty of Automatic Control, Electronics and Computer Science at the Silesian University of Technology. In 2014, he received the postdoctoral degree (habilitation) in Computer Science from the Faculty of Mechanical Engineering and Computer Science at the Częstochowa University of Technology. In 2024, he was awarded the title of Professor in Engineering and Technical Sciences in the discipline of Technical Computer Science and Telecommunications.

== Scientific and academic activity ==
Since 1999, Wojciechowski has been employed at the Institute of Information Technology of the Łódź University of Technology, where he became Director in 2018. Between 2016 and 2020, he served as Vice-Dean for Development and Business Cooperation at the Faculty of Technical Physics, Information Technology and Applied Mathematics of the Łódź University of Technology. From 2020 to 2025, he was Dean of the same faculty. In 2025, he was appointed Vice-Rector for Development of the Łódź University of Technology.

Since 2016, he has been a member of the ICT Cluster Central Poland Council and the Łódź GameDev Cluster. Between 2016 and 2020, he served as Vice-Chair of the Steering Committee of the GameINN programme at the National Centre for Research and Development. From 2020 to 2024, he was Deputy Chair of the Łódź University of Technology Council for Academic Degrees in the disciplines of Automation, Electronics, Electrical Engineering and Space Technologies, as well as Technical Computer Science and Telecommunications. He also chaired the Rector’s Team for the Development of Artificial Intelligence. Since 2020, he has been a member of the Digital Multimedia Section of the Computer Science Committee of the Polish Academy of Sciences. He is also a member of numerous scientific societies, including the Polish Artificial Intelligence Association, the Association for Computing Machinery (ACM), and the IEEE Computer Society.

He is the author or co-author of more than 100 scientific publications. He has supervised four doctoral dissertations and several dozen master’s and engineering theses. He has participated in more than 20 research and development projects carried out in cooperation with industrial partners in Poland and abroad, coordinating seven of them. He has completed research internships in France, the United Kingdom, and Slovakia.

His research interests focus on artificial intelligence, human–computer interaction, computer graphics, computer vision, computer games, virtual environments, cognitive computing, and computer simulation and visualization.

Wojciechowski serves as Editor-in-Chief of the journal Human Technology, Associate Editor of Expert Systems, a member of the Editorial Board of Machine Graphics and Vision, and a member of the Steering Committee of the Polish Conference on Artificial Intelligence (PP-RAI). He is the principal organizer of the International Conference on Computer Game Innovations (CGI) and the National Team Competition for Computer Game Development (ZTGK). He also serves on the programme committees of the International Conference on Computational Collective Intelligence, the International Conference on Information Technologies in Biomedicine, the International Conference on Computer Science and Information Technologies, and the Ecuadorian Conference on Information and Communication Technologies.
