= Maroof Afzal =

Pakistani civil servant (died 2020)

Cabinet Secretary of Pakistan
- In office May 2019 – April 2020
- Appointed by: Imran Khan
- Succeeded by: Sardar Ahmad Nawaz Sukhera

Personal details
- Born: 15 April 1960 Lahore, Punjab, Pakistan
- Died: 10 December 2020 (aged 60) Lahore, Punjab, Pakistan
- Education: Cadet College Petaro
- Occupation: Civil servant

Maroof Afzal (died 10 December 2020) was a Pakistani civil servant who belonged to the Pakistan Administrative Service and served as the Establishment Secretary and Cabinet Secretary of Pakistan.

== Biography ==
He served in BPS-22 grade as the Cabinet Secretary of Pakistan under Prime Minister Imran Khan and as Establishment Secretary under Prime Minister Shahid Khaqan Abbasi. He belonged to the Pakistan Administrative Service. He is among the very few civil servants in the country's history to have served at both the coveted positions of Secretary Cabinet and Secretary Establishment; two bureaucratic posts which report directly to the Prime Minister of Pakistan. Afzal was promoted to the rank of Federal Secretary in December 2017.

Other key grade 22 positions which he held include Federal Secretary for Industries and Production and Federal Secretary for Information Technology. As a grade 21 officer, Maroof served as chairman of the Capital Development Authority and chairman of the National Highway Authority. He belonged to the 15th CTP and was batchmates with Jawad Rafique Malik, Fawad Hasan Fawad, Sikandar Sultan Raja, Rizwan Ahmed and Hussain Asghar.

After his retirement from the civil services, Afzal was appointed as member of the Federal Public Service Commission in April 2020.

Later in November 2020, he was notified as Chairman of the Federal Public Service Commission however he could not take oath of his office as he contracted coronavirus. On 10 December 2020, he died from COVID-19 during the COVID-19 pandemic in Pakistan.

== Awards ==
In 2023, he was awarded the Hilal-i-Imtiaz by the President of Pakistan.

== See also ==
- Government of Pakistan
