= Chief Secretary of Balochistan =

High-ranking bureaucrat of Balochistan, Pakistan

- Incumbent; Shakeel Qadir Khan since 18 August 2023
- Reports to: Chief Minister of Balochistan
- Seat: Quetta
- Appointer: Prime Minister of Pakistan
- First holder: Rifat Pasha Sheikh
- Website: www.cs.balochistan.gov.pk

The Chief secretary of Balochistan (Urdu: مُعْتَمَد اعلٰی بلوچستان ; Balochi: بلوچستان ءِ دبیر ارشد; Pashto: د بلوچستان لوی دبیر; Dari: دبیر ارشد بلوچستان), also referred to as CS Balochistan, is the bureaucratic chief and highest-ranking official of the Government of Balochistan, Pakistan. The appointment of the chief secretary is appointed directly by the Prime Minister of Pakistan. The position of chief secretary is equivalent to the rank of Federal Secretary and the position holder usually belongs to the Pakistan Administrative Service.

The chief secretary is the province's administrative boss as all the divisional commissioners and administrative secretaries of province report to him. The CS in turn reports to the chief minister of Balochistan, however the chief secretary is not under the charge of the chief minister as only the prime minister can appoint or remove the CS from his position. The chief secretary also serves as the chief advisor to the chief minister and as secretary to the provincial Cabinet.

== List of chief secretaries ==
The following table lists down the names of chief secretaries that have remained in office since 1970.

No.	Name of Chief Secretary	Entered office	Left office
1	Rifat Pasha Sheikh	July 1970	June 1972
2	S.B Awan	June 1972	November 1975
3	Syed Munir Hussain	November 1975	October 1976
4	Nasr U Minallah	October 1976	July 1977
5	Raja Ahmed Khan	July 1977	April 1980
6	Zia Ud Din Khan	April 1980	October 1980
7	Jamil Ahmed	October 1980	October 1982
8	Saleem Abbas Jillani	October 1982	June 1985
9	Faqir Muhammad Baloch	June 1985	November 1986
10	S.R Poneegar	November 1986	September 1990
11	Javed Talat	September 1990	September 1991
12	A.Z.K Sherdil	September 1991	September 1994
13	Sikandar Hayat Jamali	September 1994	November 1996
14	Syed Roshan Zameer	November 1996	April 1997
15	Syed Shahid Hussain	April 1997	May 1998
16	Muhammad Younas Khan	May 1998	February 1999
17	Mirza Qamar Baig	February 1999	February 2000
18	Maj (R) Muhammad Ashraf Nasir	February 2000	March 2001
19	Maj (R) Ayub Khan	March 2001	November 2001
20	Pervaiz Saleem	December 2001	January 2003
21	Maj (R) Muhammad Ashraf Nasir	January 2003	August 2004
22	Maj (R) Naeem Khan	August 2004	May 2005
23	KB Rind	May 2005	April 2008
24	Nasir Mahmood Khosa	April 2008	February 2010
25	Mir Ahmed Bakhsh Lehri	February 2010	March 2012
26	Babar Yaqoob Fateh Muhammad	March 2012	June 2014
27	Saifullah Chattha	June 2014	March 2017
28	Shoaib Mir Memon	March 2017	May 2017
29	Aurangzeb Haque	May 2017	June 2018
30	Akhtar Nazir	June 2018	August 2019
31	Fazeel Asghar	August 2019	February 2021
32	Mather Niaz Rana	February 2021	April 2022
33	Abdul Aziz Uqaili	April 2022	August 2023
34	Shakeel Qadir Khan	August 2023	Incumbent

== See also ==
- Federal Secretary
- Pakistan Administrative Service
- Establishment Secretary of Pakistan
- Cabinet Secretary of Pakistan
- Chief Secretary Sindh
- Chief Secretary Khyber Pakhtunkhwa
- Chief Secretary Punjab
- Chief Secretary (Pakistan)
