= Nargis Sethi =

Pakistani politician

Cabinet Secretary of Pakistan

Principal Secretary to the Prime Minister
- Preceded by: Siraj Shamsuddin
- Succeeded by: Khushnood Akhtar Lashari

Personal details
- Spouse: Saleem Sethi
- Education: Karachi University, Quaid-e-Azam University
- Profession: Civil Service
- Awards: Hilal-i-Imtiaz (2012)

Nargis Sethi (Urdu: نرگس سیٹھی) is a retired Pakistani civil service officer of the Pakistan Administrative Service who served in BPS-22 grade as the Cabinet Secretary of Pakistan and Principal Secretary to the Prime Minister of Pakistan. Other heavyweight assignments held by Sethi include Secretary for Water and Power, Secretary for Economic Affairs and Defence Secretary of Pakistan. She was the first woman in the country's history to be posted as Principal Secretary to the Prime Minister.

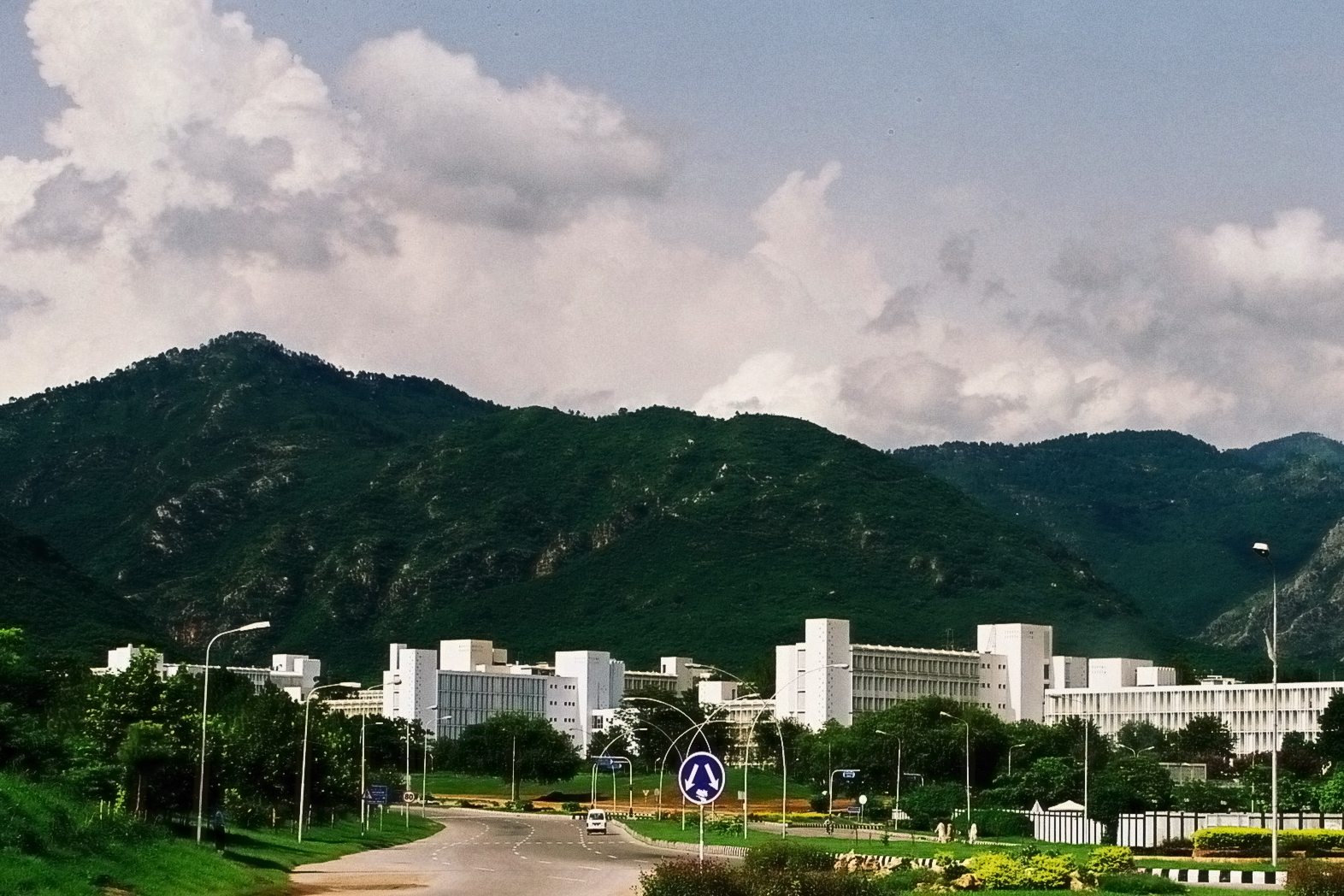
Pakistan Secretariat, Islamabad

Sethi was promoted to the rank of Federal Secretary by Prime Minister Yousaf Raza Gillani in October 2010. After she retired from the civil services, she was appointed member of the Federal Public Service Commission.

== Education ==
Sethi holds post-graduate degrees in international relations from Karachi University, defence studies from Quaid-e-Azam University, and a Master of Science in Development Administration from a university in the United States.

== Personal life ==
Sethi is married to Saleem Sethi who is also a retired senior civil service officer.

== Awards and recognition ==
- Hilal-i-Imtiaz (Crescent of Excellence) Award by the President of Pakistan in 2012

== See also ==
- Nasir Mahmood Khosa
- Jawad Rafique Malik
- Rizwan Ahmed
- Tariq Bajwa
- Rabiya Javeri Agha
- Fawad Hassan Fawad
- Syed Abu Ahmad Akif
- Tasneem Noorani
