= Iqbal Hussain Durrani =

Pakistani civil servant

National Security Secretary of Pakistan
- In office March 2019 – June 2019
- Appointed by: Imran Khan

Additional Secretary for National Health Services
- In office September 2018 – March 2019
- Appointed by: Shahid Khaqan Abbasi

Personal details
- Born: Islamic Republic of Pakistan
- Occupation: Civil servant

Iqbal Hussain Durrani is a retired Pakistani civil servant who served in BPS-22 grade as the National Security Secretary of Pakistan. Durrani belongs to the Pakistan Administrative Service and is the son-in-law of former Chief Minister of Sindh, Qaim Ali Shah. History was made when Prime Minister Imran Khan in 2019 promoted both Durrani as well as his wife, Pakistan Administrative Service officer Naheed Shah Durrani, to grade 22; as it was the first time in the country's bureaucratic history that both husband and wife were promoted together to the elite rank of Federal Secretary.

Durrani spent majority of his active service years in the Government of Sindh having served as provincial secretary of various departments. He was widely regarded as being one of the most influential provincial secretaries of Sindh. He belongs to the 15th CTP and is batchmates with Sikandar Sultan Raja, Fawad Hasan Fawad, Rizwan Ahmed, Hussain Asghar, Jawad Rafique Malik and Allah Dino Khawaja.

== See also ==
- Government of Pakistan
- Pakistan Administrative Service
- Government of Sindh
