= Kamran Lashari =

Pakistani civil servant (born 1952)

- کامران لشاری; کامران لاشاری
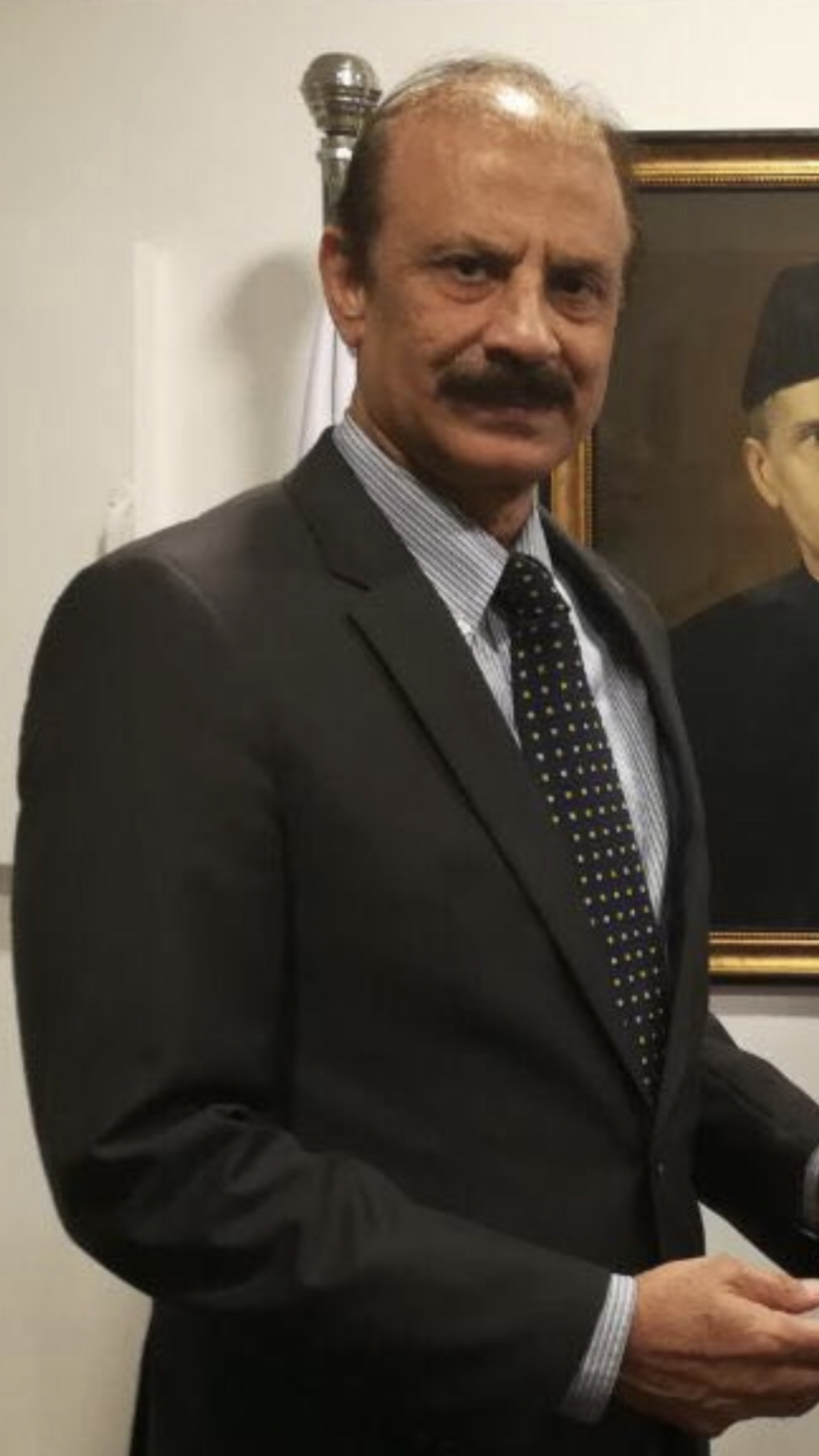

Personal details
- Born: 21 December 1952 (age 73) Lahore, West Punjab, Pakistan
- Children: Bilal Lashari and 2 others
- Education: Virginia Commonwealth University
- Occupation: Civil servant, Pakistan Administrative Service

Kamran Lashari (Punjabi: کامران لشاری; Urdu: کامران لاشاری; born 21 December 1952) is a Pakistani retired civil servant of the Pakistan Administrative Service who served in BPS-22 grade at the top bureaucratic offices including as Petroleum Secretary of Pakistan and Chief Secretary Sindh. Lashari is best known for his five-year stint as chairman of the Capital Development Authority during the government of Pervez Musharraf. After retirement from active civil service, Lashari remained president of the Lahore Gymkhana and director general of the Walled City of Lahore Authority.

The tenure of Kamran Lashari as Director General of the WCLA was criticized by members of Lahore's civil society, including journalist Waqar mustafa (Sipr) famous as Lahore-Wala and artist Ajaz Anwar, who is Redt Professor of NCA and Famous Art Work on Old Lahore, who questioned the legalities of the repeated extensions of his appointment.

== Early life and family ==
Kamran was born on 21 December 1952 into a Baloch family belonging to the Lashari tribe in Lahore, West Punjab.

He is father of film director Bilal Lashari. He also featured in Waar, a movie directed by his son in 2013. In the movie, Lashari played the role of Asher Azeem, DG of Pakistan's Internal Security.

== Career ==
Lashari served as the Petroleum Secretary of Pakistan and Chief Secretary Sindh. Other assignments he held include Federal Secretary for Environment and chairman of the Capital Development Authority (CDA). He was brought in CDA by then Interior Minister Faisal Saleh Hayat. He is widely regarded as the most successful chairman in CDA's history. He served as chairman CDA for five years and became an aide of President Pervez Musharraf.

In the initial stages of his career, he served as assistant commissioner of Umerkot and deputy commissioner of Karachi and Sukkur. He also served in Punjab as deputy commissioner in many districts.

== See also ==
- Nasir Mahmood Khosa
- Tariq Bajwa
- Fawad Hassan Fawad
- Rizwan Ahmed
- Jawad Rafique Malik
- Hussain Asghar
