= Information Secretary of Pakistan =

Administrative post of the ministry of Information & Broadcasting

- Reports to: Information Minister of Pakistan
- Seat: Islamabad
- Appointer: Prime Minister of Pakistan
- Website: Ministry of Information

The Information Secretary of Pakistan is the Federal Secretary for the Ministry of Information, Broadcasting and National Heritage. The position holder is a BPS-22 grade officer, usually belonging to the Pakistan Administrative Service. The Information Secretary heads the Ministry that is responsible to release government information, media galleries, public domain and government unclassified non-scientific data to the public and international communities. Information Secretary is a prominent position in the federal government.

== See also ==
- Government of Pakistan
- Federal Secretary
- Interior Secretary of Pakistan
- Cabinet Secretary of Pakistan
- Finance Secretary of Pakistan
- Petroleum Secretary of Pakistan
- Ministry of Information, Broadcasting and National Heritage
