= Naveed Kamran Baloch =

Pakistani civil servant

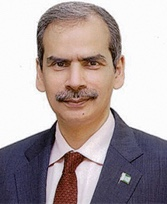

Finance Secretary of Pakistan
- In office May 2019 – December 2020
- Appointed by: Imran Khan

Personal details
- Born: Islamic Republic of Pakistan
- Education: London School of Economics
- Occupation: Civil servant, Pakistan Administrative Service

Naveed Kamran Baloch is a retired Pakistani civil servant currently serving as Federal Ombudsman of Pakistan, in office since March 2026. As a civil servant, he served in BPS-22 grade at the top bureaucratic offices of Cabinet Secretary and Finance Secretary of Pakistan. Baloch belonged to the Pakistan Administrative Service and was promoted to the rank of Federal Secretary in October 2017. After retirement from active civil service as one of the senior-most federal secretaries in the country, Baloch was appointed the executive director to World Bank.

He hails from Sindh and holds a master's degree from the London School of Economics. He is also a certified Board Director of Pakistan Institute of Corporation Governance.

== Family ==
Naveed Kamran Baloch is son of Sher Khan Baloch of the Almani Tribe from Naushahro Feroze District, who served as a chief engineer in the irrigation department. Baloch is son-in-law of Ghulam Mujtaba Jatoi, the younger brother of former prime minister Ghulam Mustafa Jatoi. Baloch's elder brother, Alam Baloch, had previously served as the provincial secretary of Sindh's irrigation department.

Baloch holds a master's degree in social policy and planning in developing countries from the London School of Economics. He is also a certified Board Director of Pakistan Institute of Corporate Governance.

== Career ==
Naveed Kamran Baloch served as the Finance Secretary of Pakistan, in office from May 2019 till December 2020. As the Federal Finance Secretary, he was on the board of directors of State Bank of Pakistan (SBP), Sui Northern Gas Pipelines Limited (SNGPL), Pakistan International Airlines (PIA) and Pakistan Telecommunication Company Limited (PTCL).

Baloch held the coveted assignment of Cabinet Secretary of Pakistan under Prime Minister Imran Khan for a brief period of about two months from March 2019 till May 2019. Prior to that, he served as Chief Secretary Khyber Pakhtunkhwa, appointed by the Mulk caretaker ministry in September 2018 where he served till February 2019.

Baloch has previously also served as chairman of the State Life Insurance Corporation of Pakistan and as director general of the National Institute of Management, Karachi. He served for several years in the Government of Sindh as the provincial Secretary Finance, provincial Secretary Food and provincial Secretary Information. Baloch has also previously served as Principal Secretary to the Sindh Chief Minister, Murad Ali Shah.

== See also ==
- Fawad Hasan Fawad
- Tariq Bajwa
- Rizwan Ahmed
- Jawad Rafique Malik
