= Zafarullah Khan (lawyer) =

Pakistani politician

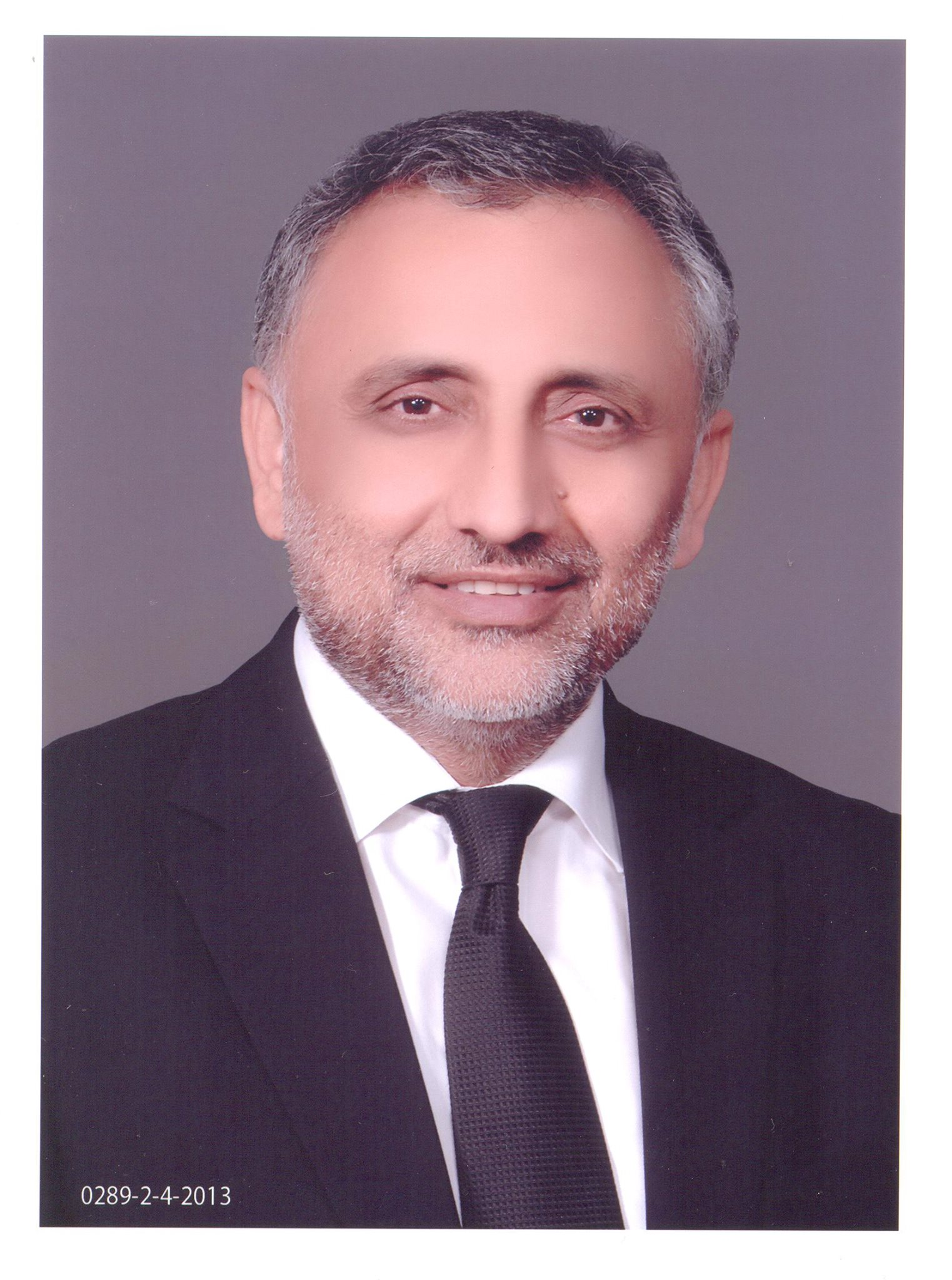

Personal details
- Party: Pakistan Muslim League (N)

Zafarullah Khan (Urdu: ظفراللہ خان) is a Pakistani Politician, Barrister-at-Law and Writer/Author. He served as Special Assistant to the Prime Minister on Law/Federal Minister, Government of Pakistan (2016-2018); Special Assistant to the Prime Minister on Human Rights, Minister of State, Government of Pakistan (2014–15); Special Assistant to the Prime Minister on Economic Affairs/ Minister of State Government of Pakistan (2014–15); Special Assistant to the Prime Minister on Cabinet Division/ Minister of State Government of Pakistan (2014–15); Special Assistant to the Prime Minister on Parliamentary Affairs/Minister of State Government of Pakistan (2014); Secretary, Law, Justice and Human Rights, Government of Pakistan (Oct 2013-Nov 2014). He Joined District Management Group of Civil Service of Pakistan (1987); served in the provinces of Punjab and Sindh in various Administrative, judicial and local Government positions from 1989 to 1995 and from 1998 to 2002.

== Education ==
Khan received a Bachelor of Arts degree from Bahauddin Zakariya University in 1981. He received a Master of Science (MSc) degree in International Relations from Quaid-i-Azam University in 1984; MSc in Development Studies, SOAS, London, UK (First term) (1995); a degree in Bachelor in Law (LLB) from City, University of London in 1996; Barrister-at-Law, Lincoln's Inn, London, United Kingdom (1998).

Khan did Postgraduate Diploma in Bar Vocational Course from the University of the West of England in 1997; Khan was called to the Bar by the Honourable Society of Lincoln's Inn, London, United Kingdom (1998).

== Courses ==
Zafarullah Khan has attended many specialist courses including: Negotiations on Financial Transactions, United Nations Institute of Training and Research (2004); Alternate Dispute Resolution, United Nations Institute of Training and Research (2004); International Labour Standards Course for Judges and Lawyers, at International Training Centre, Turin, Italy (2005); Private International Law, The Hague Academy of International Law, Netherlands (2007); Globalization’, Oxford University, UK, (2011).

== Distinctions ==
He has many distinctions to his credit: Declared ‘Competent’ in Bar Vocational Examination, University of the West of England, Bristol, United Kingdom; First position in LLB, City University, London, United Kingdom; First position and Certificate of Merit in MSc, Quaid-i-Azam University, Islamabad; Second position and Merit Certificate in Bachelor of Arts, Bahauddin Zakariya University, Multan; Second position and silver medal in Intermediate Examination, Board of Education, Multan; Fatima Jinnah Gold Medal for promotion of women rights by Ministry of Women Development, Pakistan (2004).

== Career ==
In October 2013, Khan was appointed Law Secretary of Pakistan. where he remained until November 2014.

In 2015, he was appointed the special assistant to Prime Minister of Pakistan Nawaz Sharif for human rights division with the status of minister of state.

Before starting his law practice in 2002, Khan served for 15 years in the civil service as a Pakistan Administrative Service officer after clearing his CSS examinations. He belonged to the 15th CTP, the same batch as Allah Dino Khawaja, Rizwan Ahmed, Sikandar Sultan Raja, Jawad Rafique Malik and Fawad Hasan Fawad. Khan served as Assistant Commissioner, Deputy Commissioner, Deputy Secretary, and Additional Secretary in provincial departments in Sindh and Punjab. He also served as Administrator of various municipal committees and corporations during his tenure with the Government.

He has taught law, Human Rights and International Relations at International Islamic University, Islamabad, Quaid-e-Azam University, Islamabad, Iqra University, Islamabad, Bahria University, Islamabad, Punjab University, Lahore, University of Lahore, at Masters and PhD levels and also taught at Civil Services Academy, Lahore, National Police Academy, Islamabad, and many other institutions of higher learning and training. He is interested in reading and writing. His interests include Law, Political Economy, Psychology, Philosophy, Political Science, International Relations, Human Rights, Literature, Religions, and Sufism. He has authored many books and booklets on Law, Human Rights, Islam, Sufism and International Relations.

He has authored many books and booklets on Law, Human Rights, Islam, Sufism and International Relations.

== Law career ==
Professionally, Khan is a barrister at law and a senior advocate of the Supreme Court of Pakistan. He is Head of Chambers/Managing partner of JURISCONSULTS. Khan has represented several high-profile Pakistani personalities including Prime ministers of Pakistan in various cases such as Shahid Khaqan Abbasi; he has represented PML(N) multiple times.

He has worked as legal and human rights consultant on women, children and labour issues with different UN organizations, INGOs and NGOs. He was the Team Leader in DFID funded ‘Pakistan Family Protection Project’, Ministry of Women Development, (2003-2004) and remained Legal Adviser, Ministry of Women Development, (2003-6) dealing with UN reports and drafting/advocating pro-women legislation i.e. honour-killing, domestic violence, human trafficking. He prepared 7-volume study of ‘Child Related Laws of Pakistan’ for UNICEF and National Commission for Child Welfare and Development, Government of Pakistan (2003-4). He carried out a study on Child Domestic Workers (2004); drafted ‘Pakistan Child Commission Act 2004’; reviewed Child Related Laws, Policies and Standards of Sindh/Pakistan (2004-6); and worked on child birth registration and child labor laws (2011). He implemented (with FPAP) a EU Project on ‘Institutional Strengthening and Capacity Building of Public Functionaries in Burn Cases’ (2004-5). He worked with ILO Pakistan (2004-2012) on elimination of bonded labour, prison labour practices, ILO Conventions 100 and 111, judicial remedies for bonded labour and prevention of harassment at workplace. He remained Legal Adviser of UN Habitat, Islamabad and prepared a book and manuals on land and property rights in Pakistan (2011–13). He was part of civil society campaign for ratification of Convention against Torture and Other Cruel, Inhuman or Degrading Treatment or Punishment (2005-2010).

Barrister Khan represented Pakistan before United Nations’ Committee on the Child in Geneva in 2003 and 2009. He was head of Pakistan delegation to UN Committee on the Rights of Child in 58th Session (March 2014), 59th Session of the UN Commission on the Status of Women (March 2015) New York. He headed Pakistan delegations for UN 1508th Meeting of Committee Against Torture (April 2017), 32nd Meeting of Committee on Economic, Social and Cultural Rights (June 2017), Working Group on the Universal Periodic Review of UN Human Rights Council (September 2017).

He was Guest Speaker in OXFAM regional conference on ‘Change-Maker for Domestic Violence, Colombo (March 2006). He presented many papers at International Judicial Conferences organized by Law and Justice Commission, Pakistan. He has made presentations on innumerable international and national conferences on various themes of international relations, human rights and constitutional law.
