= Fazal Abbas Maken =

Pakistani civil servant

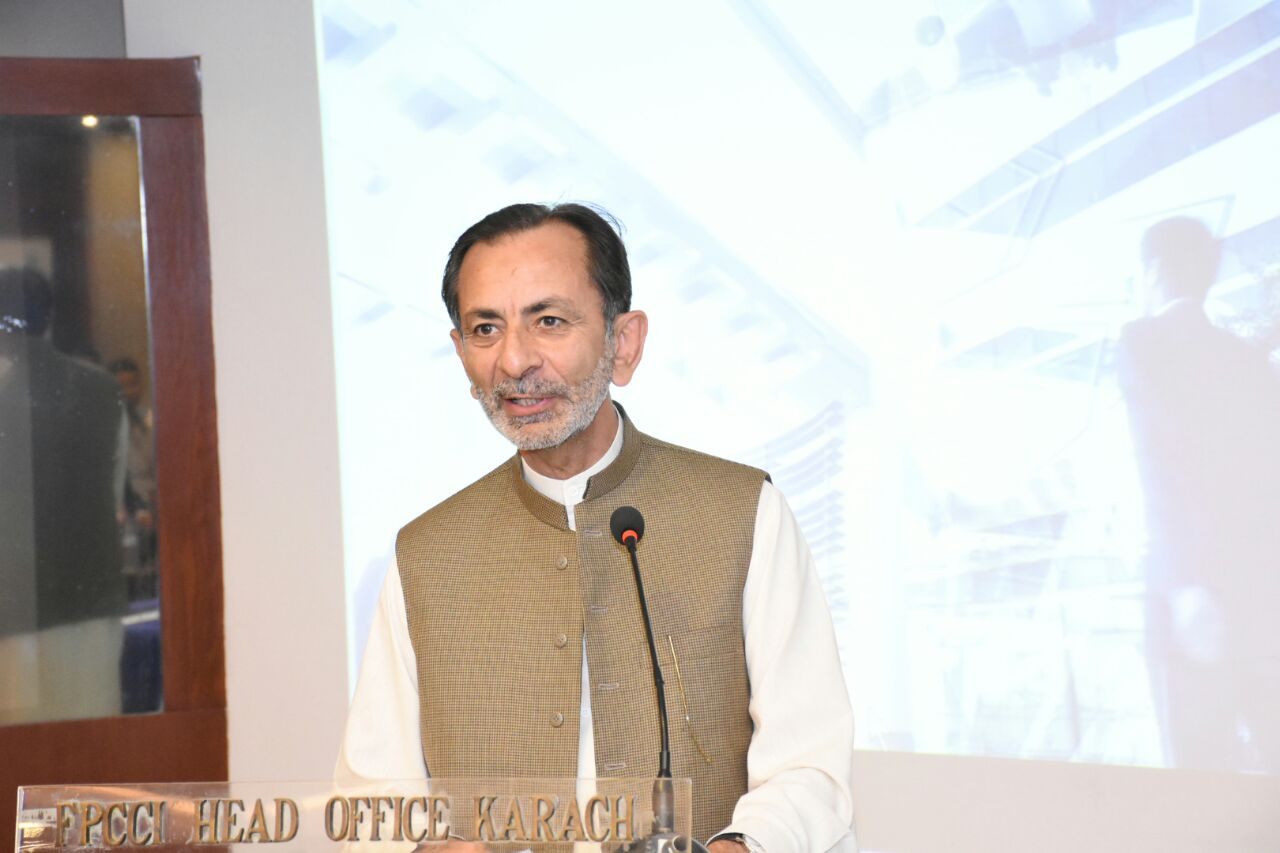
- Fazal Abbas Maken addressing FPCCI office bearers

Cabinet Secretary of Pakistan
- In office August 2018 – March 2019
- Appointed by: Imran Khan

Personal details
- Born: Sargodha, Pakistan
- Occupation: Career Bureaucrat

Fazal Abbas Maken is a retired Pakistani civil servant, belonging to the Pakistan Administrative Service, who retired in BPS-22 grade. He remained Cabinet Secretary of Pakistan from 14 August 2018 until his retirement on 21 March 2019.

Prior to his posting as the Cabinet Secretary, he was the Federal Secretary for Ministry of National Food Security & Research. He also remained Federal Secretary of Ministry of Science and Technology. He has also served as the Additional Secretary of Ministry of Commerce and Additional Secretary of Ministry of Interior. From February 2005 to August 2009, Mr Maken served as Minister (Trade) at the Pakistan High Commission, New Delhi.

After his retirement, Prime Minister of Pakistan, Imran Khan, proposed his name for the post of the Chief Election Commissioner of Pakistan.

He was appointed as the Member of the prestigious Federal Public Service Commission by order of the President of Pakistan on 10 November 2020 for a period of 3 years.
