= Shoaib Mir Memon =

Pakistani civil servant

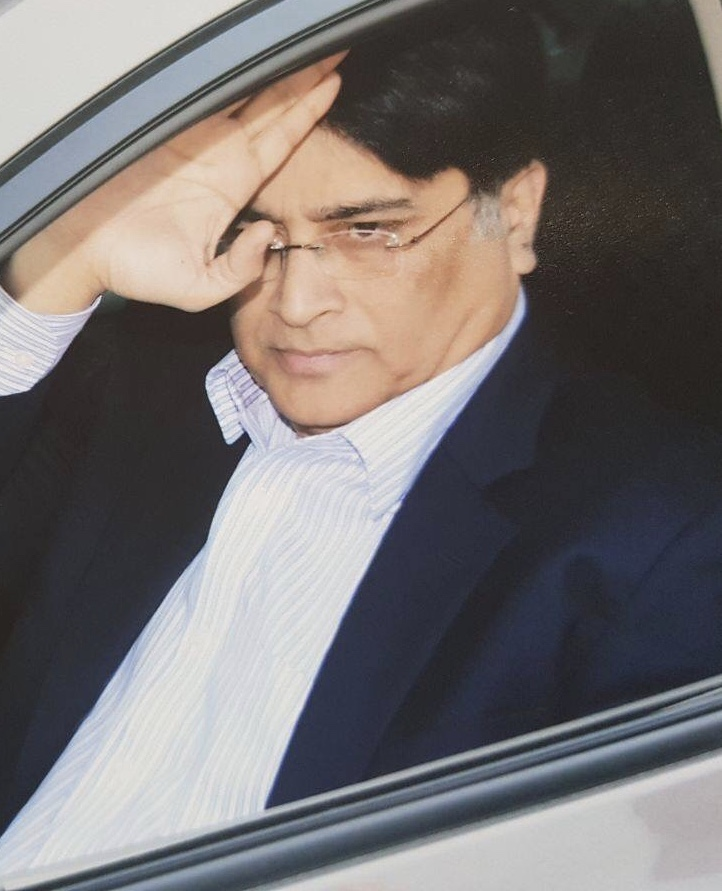

Personal details
- Born: Islamic Republic of Pakistan
- Education: Bachelor of Medicine, Bachelor of Surgery (MBBS)
- Occupation: Civil servant, Pakistan Administrative Service

Shoaib Mir Memon is a retired Pakistani civil servant who served in BPS-22 grade as the Education Secretary of Pakistan and Chief Secretary Balochistan. Memon belongs to the Pakistan Administrative Service and was promoted to the rank of Federal Secretary in December 2017. Hailing from Sindh, he has also served as chairman and chief executive officer of State Life and Additional Secretary Establishment Division.

Memon attained a degree of MBBS and is also a Certified Director from Pakistan Institute of Corporate Governance.

== Career ==
Memon has held various key positions throughout his career with the most notable of his assignments being Chief Secretary Balochistan and Education Secretary of Pakistan. He has also served as chairman of State Life Insurance Corporation of Pakistan. Other positions where he has served include Additional Secretary Establishment Division and as Principal Secretary to Governor of Balochistan.

Memon belongs to the 15th CTP and is batchmates with Maroof Afzal, Iqbal Hussain Durrani, Rizwan Ahmed, Fawad Hassan Fawad and Allah Dino Khawaja. After retirement from active civil service, Memon was made member of the prestigious Federal Public Service Commission.

== See also ==
- Government of Pakistan
- Pakistan Administrative Service
