= Rabiya Javeri Agha =

British Pakistani journalist and civil servant (born 1963)

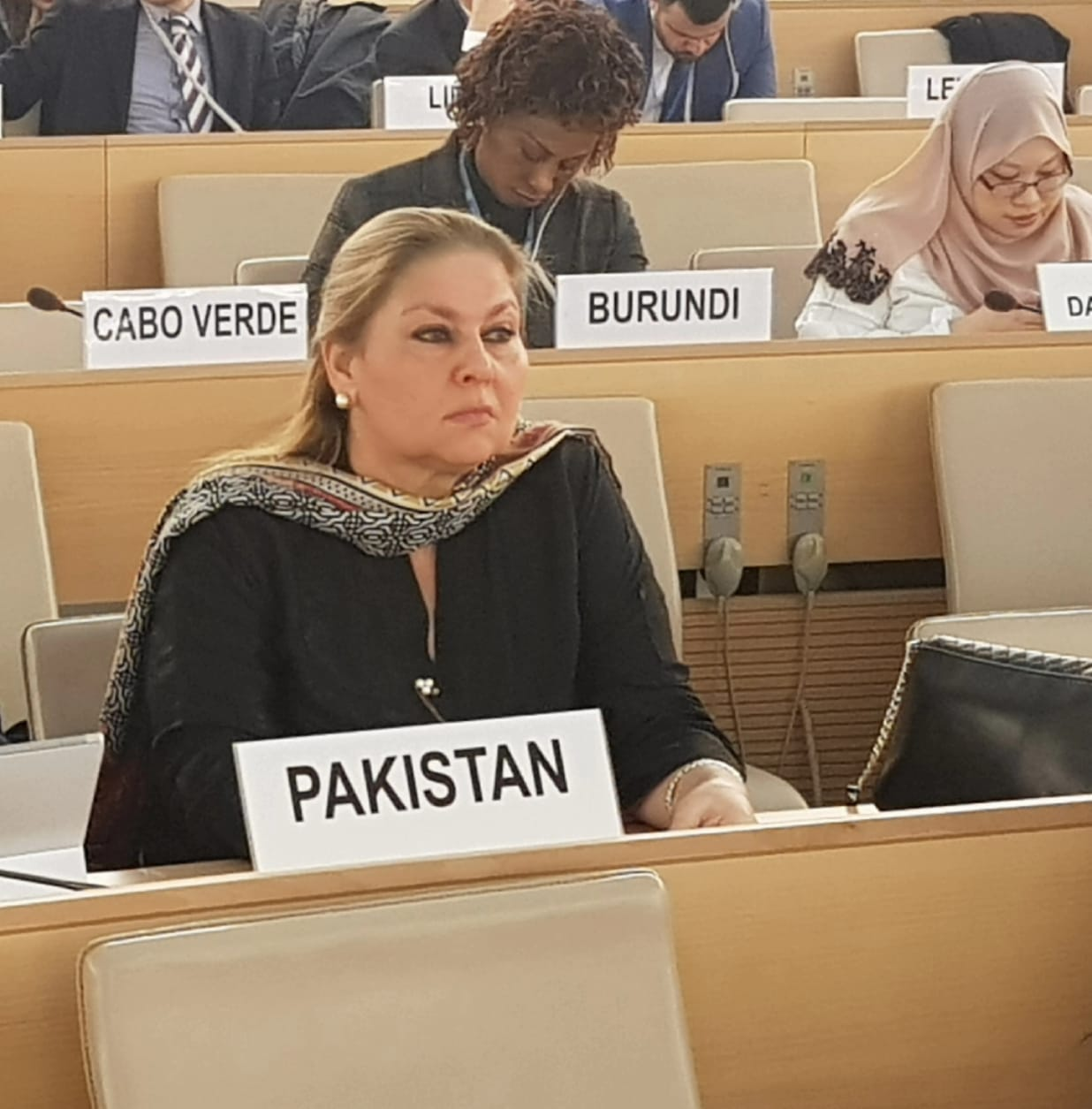
Javeri representing Pakistan

Rabiya Javeri Agha (born Rabiya Adila Javeri; December 28, 1963) is the chairperson of the National Commission for Human Rights (NCHR) in Pakistan, and a retired civil servant who served in the Government of Pakistan in BPS-22 grade as Federal Secretary. She was the first unanimously elected female President of the Pakistan Administrative Service (PAS) Officers Association. Rabiya has had an extensive career ranging from human rights, women's development, sustainable tourism, energy, finance and trade.

Rabiya is a graduate from Mount Holyoke College USA and the Blavatnik School of Government, Oxford University. In 2021, she was awarded an honorary Doctorate in Law from her Mount Holyoke for her work on women and vulnerable communities.

As Secretary at the Ministry of Human Rights, Agha was involved in the drafting and promulgation of various legislation such as the National Commission on the Rights of the Child Act 2017, the Hindu Marriage Act, 2017, the Islamabad Capital Territory Child Protection Act, 2018, the Transgender Persons (Protection of Riqhts) Act, 2018, and the Juvenile Justice System Act, 2018.

In February 2020, Agha was central in developing and presenting the 5th Periodical CEDAW Report, in Geneva, Switzerland. The Pakistan delegation led by Agha was also the first in history to include a transgender activist and expert in its presentation at the Convention.

Moreover, from 2013 to 2017, Agha was integral in reorganizing the Trade Development Authority of Pakistan, during her time as Secretary.

In her current position as the chairperson of the National Commission for Human Rights (NCHR) Pakistan, Rabiya has taken up several important human rights issues including employment of minorities and quota system, inheritance rights of Pakistani women, rights of transgender persons, prevention of domestic violence, prison reform, access to justice for women and juveniles, and the general protection and promotion of the human rights of all citizens of Pakistan, with a special focus on vulnerable groups.

== Early life ==
Rabiya is the daughter of jeweler Seth Hasan Javeri, who originated from Nawanagar State and Syeda Ayesha Rafique Javeri of Allahbad. She is also the sister of photographer Tapu Javeri, and artist Zehra Laila Javeri.

Her early education was at Convent of Jesus and Mary and Karachi Grammar School. She graduated with a double major in Politics and English Literature from Mount Holyoke College.

== Career ==
Before joining the bureaucracy, Rabiya Javeri Agha worked as a journalist for the Dawn newspaper. She has written over 300 articles on social, political and cultural issues. She has also authored and published research papers on Sufism and on the Afghan political and refugee crisis.

Agha joined the civil service in 1986. She has held the posts of Magistrate of the First and Second Class at the juvenile courts, Special Secretary to the Governor of Sindh, Secretary at the Energy Department, Secretary at the Women's Development Department in Sindh, Financial Advisor to the Mayor of Karachi and Director General at the Federal Ombudsman, among others.

When posted as Secretary for the Women's Development Department of Sindh, Agha launched the legal aid committee for women in prison. As Special Secretary under the Governor of Sindh, she also set up a Legend Fund to provide assistance to ailing artists and musicians and successfully implemented the cultural documentation of arts and crafts in the province of Sindh in collaboration with UNESCO in Pakistan.

As Secretary Trade Development Authority (Pakistan) (TDAP), Agha took steps to develop the financial rules after a lapse of a decade which resulted in the proper procedure for promotion, increments and other human resources for the TDAP officers. Agha also made significant efforts to develop Pakistan's trade relations on a global platform. She traveled throughout Pakistan and Europe to promote goods, like textiles and fashion, as well as the resources Pakistan has available. During her tenure as Secretary TDAP, Pakistan had the singular honour to be one of two countries displaying local garments at the 37th Texworld Fashion Show in Paris. More cross country exhibitions such as Aalishan Pakistan in New Delhi in India, Single Country Exhibition in Sri Lanka and the Trade Caravan in Central Asia were also inaugurated. During her time as Secretary, TDAP also collaborated with Heritage Foundation of Pakistan and Mukhtar Enterprises Studio for Architecture in setting up the Astana Pavilion Village in Makli. The thematic area of reducing the carbon footprint was prepared for Pakistan's participation at the Astana Pavilion in Kazakhstan. The collaboration resulted in the Pakistan Pavilion being awarded an “Honorable Mention” under the Elements and Details category by the Exhibitor Magazine at the Astana Expo 2017.

Agha was awarded a gold medal from the Prime Minister of Pakistan Nawaz Sharif, at the Federation of Pakistan Chambers of Commerce & Industry Export Awards in Lahore for attaining export targets and displaying professionalism in her position.

Agha was also recognized as one of Pond's Miracle Women for the year 2015, in recognition for her branding and marketing of Pakistan abroad. In recognition of her services to Pakistan, Rabiya was accorded the title of "Pride of Pakistan" by the Daily Times, a leading newspaper of Pakistan.

Agha has been invited as a speaker to various events, including the 'Commonwealth Meeting for Women Affairs' in Kenya, and the World Justice Forum at the Hague.

== Secretary, Ministry of Human Rights ==
During her tenure as Federal Secretary for Human Rights, the Ministry of Human Rights (Pakistan) proposed several bills to the National Assembly of Pakistan on the rights of vulnerable groups such as The National Commission on the Rights of the Child Act, 2017, The Criminal Laws Amendment) Act, 2017, The National Commission on The Status of Women (Amendment) Act, 2017, The Women in Distress and Detention Fund (Amendment) Act, 2017 and the Juvenile Justice System Act, 2018. During Agha's tenure, the Zainab Alert Response and Recovery Act, 2020 was passed by the National Assembly of Pakistan.

In February 2020, the Committee on the Elimination of all forms of Discrimination Against Women noted that Pakistan was the first country to include a legally recognized transgender woman in its delegation led by Agha. Agha further declared the Ministry of Human Rights (Pakistan)'s commitment to implementing the Transgender (Protection of Rights) Act, 2018 by proposing draft guidelines for law enforcement agencies with transgender persons.

A proponent for prisoner's rights in Pakistan, Agha's tenure also consisted of the formation of a Commission for Implementation of Jail Reform at the Ministry of Human Rights (Pakistan) after an analysis of the Pakistan Prison Rules with the United Nations Standard Minimum Rules for the Treatment of Prisoners or the "Nelson Mandela Rules". In May 2020, Agha was also posted as Secretary for a committee formed to investigate the plight of female prisoners in Pakistan by the Prime Minister of Pakistan.

During the COVID-19 pandemic, Agha acknowledged the increased risk of domestic violence cases across the country and shared the Ministry of Human Rights (Pakistan)'s helpline number to provide free legal aid to victims of domestic violence across the country. In November, 2020 Agha authored a report on "COVID-19 and Disaster Vulnerability in Pakistan: A Human Rights Based Analysis" in response to the priority areas highlighted by the United Nations Secretary General from a human rights perspective. The report summarized the key findings of the analysis and proposed recommendations regarding human rights protection in the thematic areas of health, livelihoods and unemployment, education, food security, gender-based violence, child rights protection, refugees and migrants and prisons.

In June 2020, Agha represented the Government of Pakistan in the National Action Plan for Business and Human Rights in South Asia at the United Nations Virtual Forum on Business and Human Rights 2020.

Agha served as the statement speaker regarding Pakistan's Universal Periodic Review (UPR) Report in Geneva, and the Head of Delegation for Pakistan's CEDAW review.

== Chairperson, National Commission for Human Rights ==
In November 2021, Agha was appointed the Chairperson for the National Commission of Human Rights by the President of Pakistan.

During Agha's tenure as Chairperson, the Commission initiated several initiatives on human rights across the country, such as a digital case management system for the quick disposal of cases, development of a cohesive strategic plan through engagement with the media and launching of an awareness program on systemic discrimination against Christian sanitation workers.

Ms Rabiya has focused extensively on prison reform and the juvenile justice system, working to secure quick acquittals of juvenile prison inmates, developing literature to improve prison systems such as the "Report on Torture at Adiala Jail" and a policy draft on Bangkok Rules and the state of women prisoners. Her efforts led to the notification of Juvenile Justice Committees under Section 10 of JJSA, 2018 and the notification of Human Rights Courts under Section 21 of the NCHR Act, 2012. Under her leadership, the NCHR has developed important policy interventions and reports such 'Unequal Citizens' which discusses problems in misuse of the minority quota system. Another NCHR report, regarding mental health, was acknowledged by the President of Pakistan in a joint session of parliament.

With regards to the safety of journalists and right to information, Agha led the launch of a Women Journalists Complaint Cell in Collaboration with the Digital Rights Foundation (DRF). In a podcast titled, 'Building a Better Future: How Constructive Journalism Can Shape Pakistani Media', Agha spoke of her personal history as a journalist, and the state of journalism and safety of journalists in Pakistan, today. Another resource for women developed at NCHR under Ms Rabiya’s leadership is the Helpline on Women’s Marriage Rights, launched in collaboration with Musawi.

Recently, Agha spearheaded a campaign for the release of foreign fishermen from Pakistani jails. As a result of NCHR's campaign, the Government of Sindh ordered the repatriation of an initial batch of 199 Indian fishermen on May 4, 2023. Malir Jail commenced the arrangements for the release and shifting of the prisoners. This campaign bore fruit, with a total of 640 fishermen eventually returning to their home country, India, via Wagah Border.

== Personal life ==
Agha is married to Agha Jan Akhtar, a retired Pakistan Administrative Service civil servant. The couple have four sons.

== See also ==
- Rizwan Ahmed
- Syed Abu Ahmad Akif
- Tariq Bajwa
- Fawad Hassan Fawad
- Nasir Mahmood Khosa
- Jawad Rafique Malik
- Nargis Sethi
