= Mir Ahmed Bakhsh Lehri =

Pakistani civil servant

Personal details
- Born: 1954 (age 71–72) Kalat District, Islamic Republic of Pakistan
- Education: Wisconsin University
- Occupation: Civil servant

Mir Ahmed Bakhsh Lehri is a retired Pakistani civil servant of the Pakistan Administrative Service who served in BPS-22 grade as the Establishment Secretary of Pakistan and Chief Secretary Balochistan. Lehri is the most decorated federal secretary from Balochistan in civil service history as he headed five federal ministries and also remained the administrative boss of his home province.

Lehri cleared his CSS examination in 1978 and joined the Pakistan Administrative Service in 1980. He retired from active civil service in April 2014.

== Career ==
Lehri served as federal secretary of the Establishment Division in 2013. He also served as Chief Secretary Balochistan, Federal Education Secretary and Federal Secretary for Housing and Works. Other assignments Lehri held include director general of the Gwadar Development Authority, Pakistan's director general for Hajj in Saudi Arabia and the provincial education secretary of Balochistan. In the initial stages of his career, he served as deputy commissioner for Zhob District and political agent for Chagai District.

== See also ==
- Government of Pakistan
