= Azam Suleman Khan =

Pakistani civil servant

Ombudsman of Punjab
- In office July 2020 – July 2023

Interior Secretary of Pakistan
- In office April 2020 – June 2020
- Appointed by: Imran Khan

Chief Secretary Punjab
- In office November 2019 – April 2020
- Appointed by: Imran Khan
- Succeeded by: Jawad Rafique Malik

Personal details
- Born: 28 June 1960 (age 66) Lahore,
- Occupation: Civil servant, Pakistan Administrative Service

Azam Suleman Khan (Urdu: اعظم سلیمان خان) is a retired Pakistani civil servant who served as the Provincial Ombudsman of Punjab. He previously served in BPS-22 grade as the Interior Secretary of Pakistan, Chief Secretary Punjab and as Chief Secretary Sindh. Khan was promoted to the rank of Federal Secretary in February 2017 by Prime Minister Nawaz Sharif.

== Career in civil service ==
Azam Suleman Khan joined Pakistan Administrative Service through Pakistan Armed Forces quota on August 31, 1990. He was serving as a major in Pakistan Army before he joined civil service.

Khan belongs to the Pakistan Administrative Service. For several years he headed the Home Department of Punjab as its top bureaucrat under former CM Shahbaz Sharif. He was promoted to the rank of Federal Secretary in February 2017 by Prime Minister Nawaz Sharif. Later, he was appointed Chief Secretary Sindh in 2018 by the Mulk caretaker ministry and then served as Chief Secretary Punjab, appointed by Prime Minister Imran Khan.

Prior to his appointment as the Provincial Ombudsman Punjab he was serving as the Interior Secretary of Pakistan. He also remained District Coordination Officer of city district government Multan and Faisalabad during 2001 to 2003 and 2006 to 2008 respectively, in President General Pervaiz Musharraf's Government. He remained Deputy Commissioner Kasur from 1999 to 2001.

In June 2020, after sudden death of former Provincial Ombudsman of Punjab Najam Saeed (PAS), Khan sought premature retirement almost twelve months before his actual retirement date from active civil service in order to qualify for the constitutional position of Provincial Ombudsman of Punjab. The Punjab Cabinet confirmed his appointment as provincial Ombudsman thereafter and he was sworn into office on 1 July 2020.

== See also ==
- Rizwan Ahmed
- Jawad Rafique Malik
- Babar Yaqoob Fateh Muhammad
- Kamran Lashari
