= Nasir Mahmood Khosa =

Pakistani bureaucrat

Executive Director World Bank
- In office September 2013 – September 2017

Principal Secretary to the Prime Minister of Pakistan
- In office June 2013 – September 2013
- Appointed by: Nawaz Sharif

Chief Secretary Punjab
- In office February 2010 – April 2013
- Appointed by: Yousaf Raza Gillani

Chief Secretary Balochistan
- In office April 2008 – February 2010
- Appointed by: Yousaf Raza Gillani

Personal details
- Born: Dera Ghazi Khan, Pakistan
- Relations: Asif Saeed Khosa (brother); Latif Khosa (Cousin)
- Occupation: Career Bureaucrat

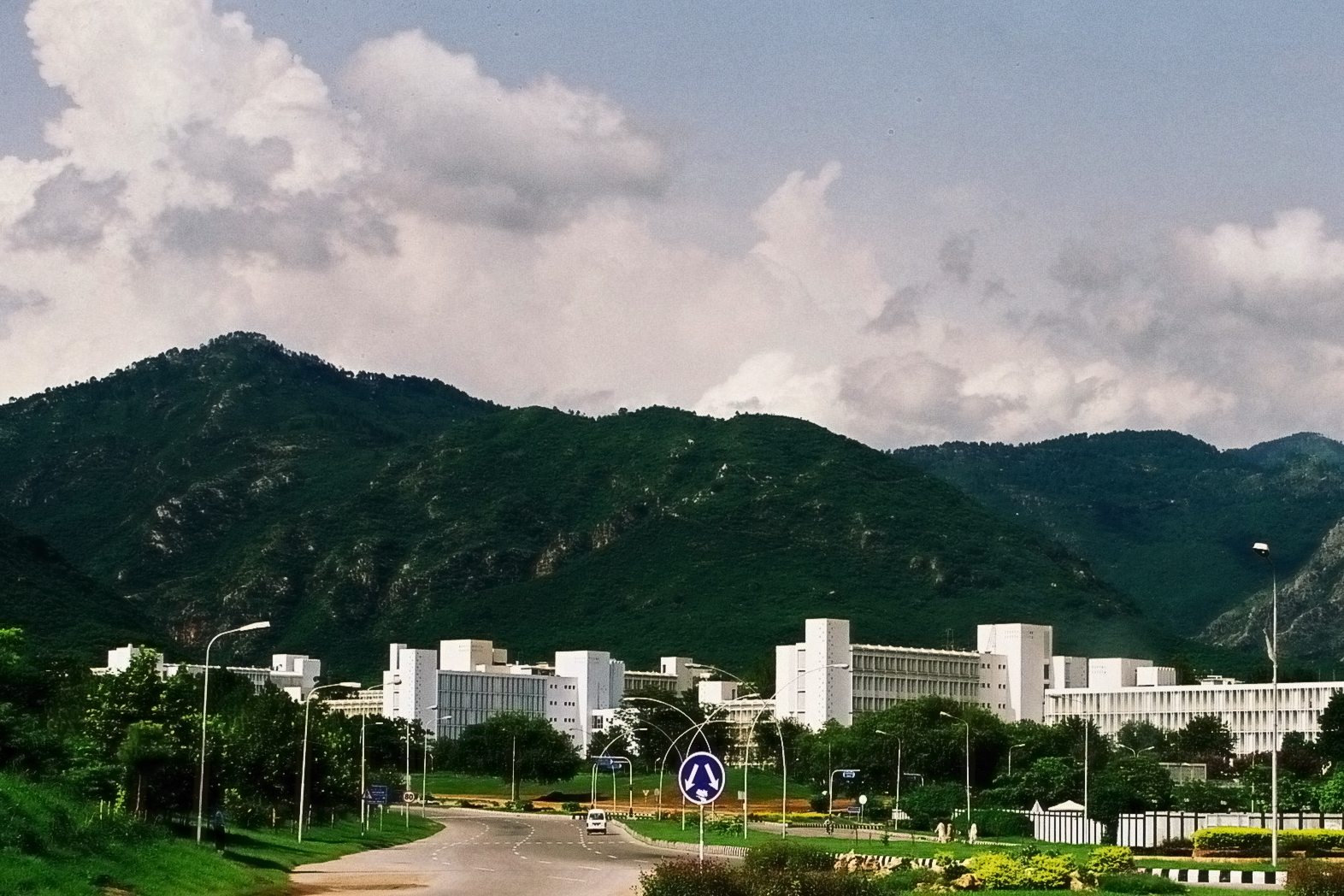
Pakistan Secretariat, Islamabad

Nasir Mahmood Khosa is a retired Pakistani civil servant from Dera Ghazi Khan who belonged to the Pakistan Administrative Service and served in BPS-22 grade, the highest attainable rank for a serving officer. He was promoted to the rank of Federal Secretary in 2010.

Khosa has an outstanding civil service record, having held the most coveted bureaucratic assignments in the country. He served as the 22nd Principal Secretary to the Prime Minister of Pakistan, as well as the administrative boss of two provinces as Chief Secretary Punjab and Chief Secretary Balochistan. Khosa also served as executive director at the World Bank from 2013-2017.

Khosa is the brother of former Chief Justice Asif Saeed Khosa and Tariq Khosa, former director general of the Federal Investigation Agency. He is also the maternal cousin of former Governor Punjab Latif Khosa.

== Nomination for chief ministership ==
On 28 May 2018, Khosa was nominated to become the caretaker Chief Minister of Punjab ahead of the 2018 general elections. He was nominated by Pakistan Tehreek-e-Insaf (PTI) to which Shehbaz Sharif agreed but PTI withdrew his name on 30 May 2018, followed by Khosa opting out and excusing himself from assuming the responsibilities of caretaker chief minister.

== See also ==
- Pakistan Administrative Service
- Nargis Sethi
- Jawad Rafique Malik
- Rizwan Ahmed
- Tariq Bajwa
- Rabiya Javeri Agha
- Fawad Hassan Fawad
- Syed Abu Ahmad Akif
- Tasneem Noorani
