= Syed Hassan Raza =

Pakistani diplomat

His Excellency / Ambassador Syed Hassan Raza
- سید حسن رضا
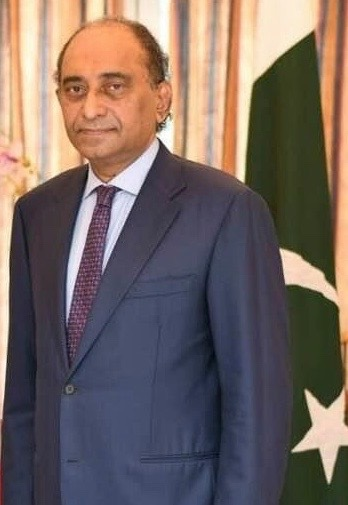

Special Foreign Secretary
- In office November 19, 2018 – January 04, 2019
- President: Arif Alvi
- Prime Minister: Imran Khan

Additional Foreign Secretary (Middle East, OIC & Legal Affairs)
- In office November 27, 2017 – November 19, 2018
- President: Arif Alvi
- Prime Minister: Imran Khan

High Commissioner of Pakistan to Malaysia
- In office February 27, 2014 – November 25, 2017
- President: Mamnoon Hussain
- Prime Minister: Nawaz Sharif; Shahid Khaqan Abbasi
- Preceded by: Shahid M. G. Kiani

Ambassador Extraordinary and Plenipotentiary of Pakistan to State of Qatar
- In office April 2, 2013 – February 26, 2014
- President: Asif Ali Zardari; Mamnoon Hussain
- Prime Minister: Raja Pervaiz Ashraf; Nawaz Sharif
- Preceded by: Sarfraz Khanzada

Personal details
- Born: January 4, 1959 (age 67) Lahore, Pakistan
- Spouse: Anila Hassan
- Education: St. Anthony's High School (Lahore); Columbia University (M.A.); University of the Punjab; Government College, Lahore
- Profession: Diplomat

Syed Hassan Raza (Urdu:سید حسن رضا) (born 4 January 1959) is a Pakistani diplomat and a former senior career foreign service officer. He served as the Special Foreign Secretary at Pakistan's Foreign Office, overseeing the Middle East, OIC & Legal divisions. Prior to this appointment, he was the High Commissioner of the Islamic Republic of Pakistan to Malaysia, and previously the Ambassador to the State of Qatar. On November 19, 2018, Ambassador Raza was promoted to Grade 22, the highest attainable rank in the Civil Service of Pakistan.

== Early life and education ==
Raza was born on January 4, 1959, in Lahore, Pakistan. His father Syed Iftikhar Ahmed was a lawyer of the Supreme Court of Pakistan and the Deputy Attorney General of Pakistan from 1978 to 1984. He attended the St. Anthony's High School (Lahore) and later, the University of the Punjab, to study Law, Political Science & Government. Later in 1989, he attended Columbia University in New York City, where he studied International Affairs, South Asian studies, Human Rights and International Law.

== Diplomatic career ==
He joined the Foreign Service of Pakistan in 1986, belonging to the 14th common. At the Ministry of Foreign Affairs Headquarters in Islamabad, his first assignments included serving as the desk officer for the United Nations and subsequently for Afghanistan. He also served as an assistant legal adviser for international law and treaties. From 2009 to 2013 he was appointed as the Director-General Economic Coordination & FODP (Friends of Democratic Pakistan) divisions at the Ministry of Foreign Affairs (Pakistan), Islamabad.

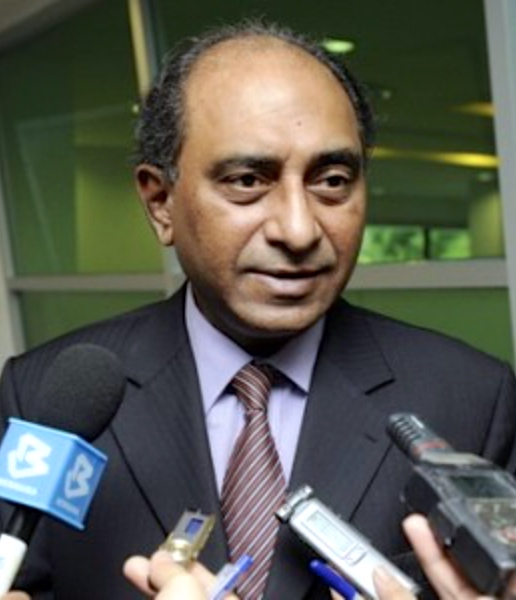
Raza addressing media personnel about Pakistan's success in counter-terrorism efforts in North Waziristan, in Kuala Lumpur, Malaysia.

His foreign diplomatic assignments include working as a political officer in the Office of the UN Special Representative for Somalia, Admiral Jonathan Howe in Mogadishu, from 1993 to 1994, at the height of the country's civil war. It was during his stay when the Battle of Mogadishu took place on 3 and 4 October 1993. He was then posted to Bishkek, Kyrgyzstan at the Embassy of Pakistan from 1995 to 1998. He returned to work in the Central Asia region from 2001 to 2003 as the deputy Head of Mission at the embassy of Pakistan in Almaty, Kazakhstan. In 2003 he was posted to Jeddah, Saudi Arabia as the deputy Consul General of Pakistan and concurrently represented Pakistan to the Organisation of Islamic Cooperation (OIC) until 2005. In 2005 he joined the OIC as an advisor to the OIC secretary-general, Ekmeleddin İhsanoğlu, on political and legal affairs. He worked in the OIC for three years, on various issues such as the reform and restructure of the organization, including its new Charter. He left the OIC in 2009 to return to the Ministry of Foreign Affairs Headquarters at Islamabad.

He served as the D-8 (Developing-8) commissioner of Pakistan from 2009 until his appointment as Pakistan's ambassador to Qatar.

== Personal life ==
Ambassador Raza is married to Anila Hassan, President of Pakistan Foreign Office Women's Association. They have two sons.
