= National Security Division Secretary =

Administrative post of the National Security Council

National Security Secretary of Pakistan
- Incumbent; Aamir Hasan
- National Security Division
- Appointer: Prime Minister of Pakistan
- Website: nsd.gov.pk

The National Security Division Secretary is the Federal Secretary to the National Security Council of Pakistan. The position holder is a BPS-22 grade officer, usually belonging to the Pakistan Administrative Service. The current National Security Secretary is Aamir Hasan.

== See also ==
- National Security Advisor
- Government of Pakistan
- Federal Secretary
- Interior Secretary of Pakistan
- Cabinet Secretary of Pakistan
