= Kamran Rasool =

Pakistani civil servant

Defence Secretary of Pakistan
- In office April 2007 – November 2008

Cabinet Secretary of Pakistan
- In office November 2006 – April 2007

Personal details
- Born: 9 April 1948 (age 78) Islamic Republic of Pakistan
- Occupation: Civil servant

Kamran Rasool (born 9 April 1948) is a retired Pakistani civil servant belonging to the Pakistan Administrative Service who served in BPS-22 grade as the Cabinet Secretary of Pakistan, Chief Secretary Punjab and later on as the Defence Secretary of Pakistan. Rasool was considered to be one of the most influential civil servants during the era of General Pervez Musharraf. Rasool was promoted to the highest civil rank of Federal Secretary in May 2003.

He holds a Post Graduate Diploma in Development Administration from Manchester University and an M.A in English from Punjab University.

== Career ==
Rasool joined the Civil Services of Pakistan in 1972. He has served as deputy commissioner of Kasur, Muzaffargarh and Jhelum, and commissioner Gujranwala. He has also served as provincial secretary for food, industries and education secretary in the Government of Punjab.

Rasool served as an additional secretary in the Interior Ministry before being appointed as chairman of the Bank of Punjab. It was during his tenure as Chairman BoP that he was promoted to the highest grade of BPS-22 grade. He was thereafter posted as the Chief Secretary of Punjab in December, the administrative boss of Pakistan's largest province. Later on, he was appointed to the coveted slot of Cabinet Secretary under Prime Minister Shaukat Aziz and then as the Defence Secretary of Pakistan. As Secretary Defence, Rasool headed the Pakistani side in the Pak-India Siachen talks in 2007.

After retirement, Rasool joined MCB Bank Limited's top brass.
