= Sardar Ahmad Nawaz Sukhera =

Pakistani civil servant

Cabinet Secretary of Pakistan
- In office 25 April 2020 – 31 January 2023
- Appointed by: Imran Khan
- Preceded by: Maroof Afzal

Personal details
- Born: Chakwal, Pakistan
- Education: Harvard University; Williams College; London School of Economics; Aitchison College
- Occupation: Civil servant

Sardar Ahmad Nawaz Sukhera is a retired Pakistani civil servant who served in BPS-22 grade, the highest attainable rank for a serving officer, as the Cabinet Secretary of Pakistan. Sukhera did his bachelor's degree in economics from the London School of Economics and obtained his master's degree in Public Administration from Harvard University. Sukhera belongs to the Pakistan Administrative Service and joined the civil service in 1985. He retired as the senior-most grade 22 officer in the country in January 2023.

== Career ==
Sukhera served as the Cabinet Secretary of Pakistan, appointed by Prime Minister Imran Khan in April 2020 and retired from active civil service on 31 January 2023. He was previously serving as the Commerce Secretary of Pakistan. Earlier, he was serving as Secretary Board of Investment (BoI). Prior to BoI, he was the Information Secretary of Pakistan.

Sukhera has also previously tenured as principal secretary to the Governor of Punjab and as deputy commissioner of Faisalabad.

It was reported that Mr. Sukhera is a dual citizen, working in Pakistan's civil service while being an American citizen. If true, he may have also been the first American to become Cabinet Secretary of Pakistan.

== Awards ==
He was awarded Hilal-i-Imtiaz by the President of Pakistan in 2023.

== See also ==
- Government of Pakistan
