= Industries and Production Secretary =

Administrative post of the ministry of Industries and Production

Industries and Production Secretary of Pakistan
- Appointer: Prime Minister of Pakistan
- Website: Ministry of Industries

The Industries and Production Secretary of Pakistan (Urdu: معتمدِ صنعت و پیداوار پاکستان) is the Federal Secretary for the Ministry of Industries and Production. The position holder is a BPS-22 grade officer, usually belonging to the Pakistan Administrative Service.

== See also ==
- Government of Pakistan
- Federal Secretary
- Commerce Secretary of Pakistan
- Cabinet Secretary of Pakistan
- Finance Secretary of Pakistan
- Petroleum Secretary of Pakistan
