= Information Technology Secretary of Pakistan =

Administrative post of the ministry of Information Technology and Telecommunication

- Appointer: Prime Minister of Pakistan
- Website: Ministry of IT

The Information Technology Secretary of Pakistan, also referred to as Secretary IT, is the Federal Secretary for the Ministry of Information Technology and Telecommunication. The position holder is a BPS-22 grade officer, usually belonging to the Pakistan Administrative Service. The position is considered to be a lucrative one and the position holder is ex officio the Chairman of the Board of Directors of Pakistan Telecommunication Company Limited.
