= Anti-Corruption Establishment Punjab =

Pakistani governmental organization

- Formation: 8 September 1961
- Type: Government Organization
- Headquarters: Punjab, Pakistan
- Region served: Punjab, Pakistan
- Parent organization: Government of Punjab
- Website: ace.punjab.gov.pk

The Anti-Corruption Establishment Punjab (ACE) is a governmental organization situated in the province of Punjab, Pakistan. Its primary objective is to investigate cases of corruption and conduct preliminary inquiries to assess whether these offenses warrant further investigation. The ACE Punjab operates under the administrative jurisdiction of the Chief Secretary, ensuring alignment with government protocols and directives in addressing corruption-related matters within the province.

The Anti-Corruption Establishment (ACE) Punjab is organized into multiple wings to efficiently manage its operations and functions. These wings include the Legal Wing, Technical Wing, Research Development and Training Wing, Monitoring and Vigilance Wing, and Administration Wing. Additionally, the ACE Punjab operates through various Regional Directorates, each led by a Regional Director, to extend its reach and effectively address corruption at the regional level. The structure and distribution of wings and directorates contribute to the comprehensive efforts of ACE Punjab in combating corruption.

== History ==
The origins of the Anti-Corruption Establishment (ACE) Punjab can be traced back to a period before 1956 when there existed a modest Anti-Corruption Cell at the provincial level, led by a Superintendent of Police within the Home Department of the Government of West Pakistan. Over time, in 1985, significant reforms were introduced, reorganizing ACE Punjab into an officer-based organization, thereby enhancing its capacity for effective decision-making and enforcement in the realm of anti-corruption initiatives.

== Notable cases ==
The Anti-Corruption Establishment (ACE) Punjab has been involved in investigating and addressing numerous high-profile cases across various departments and organizations. Some of the notable cases they have dealt with include:

- Punjab Public Service Commission scandal.
- Punjab Workers Welfare Board corruption cases.
- Rawalpindi Ring Road scam
- Excise Department corruption cases
- Allegations against former Punjab Chief Minister Usman Buzdar and his brothers for the illegal transfer of 900 kanals of land in Dera Ghazi Khan.
- Investigation into nine former PTI ministers and MPAs over alleged embezzlement of millions of rupees.
- Case against Muhammad Khan Bhatti, the principal secretary of former Punjab Chief Minister Chaudhry Pervaiz Elahi, for allegedly accepting millions of rupees in bribes.
- A raid was conducted at the residence of former PTI agriculture adviser to the Punjab government, Abdul Hai Dasti, where a significant amount of money was discovered.

== Director Generals ==
List of the Director Generals of the Anti-Corruption Establishment (ACE) Punjab.

- Sohail Zafar Chatha (Feb 2023 - Till Date)
- Nadeem Sarwar (Sep 2022 - Feb 2023)
- Capt (retd) Asad Ullah Khan (Sep 2022 - Sep 2022)
- Rai Manzoor Hussain (Jul 2022 - Sep 2022)
- Capt (retd) Asad Ullah Khan (Jul 2022 - Jul 2022)
- Rana Abdul Jabbar (May 2022 - Jul 2022)
- Ahmad Raza Sarwar (May 2022 - May 2022)
- Rai Manzoor Hussain (Feb 2022 - May 2022)
- Muhammad Goher Nafees (Aug 2019 - Feb 2022)
- Hussain Asghar (Sep 2018 - Feb 2019)
- Tariq Najeeb Najmi (Feb 2019 - Feb 2019)
- Tariq Najeeb Najmi (Jul 2018 - Jul 2018)
- Mathar Niaz Rana (Jul 2018 - Sep 2018)
- Shamim Akhtar (Mar 2016 - Jul 2016)
- Muzaffar Ali Ranjha (Jul 2016 - Jul 2018)
- Malik Hassan Iqbal (Mar 2013 - Jun 2013)
- Muhammad Anwar Rashid (Jul 2014 - Mar 2016)
- Javed Akhtar (Mar 2011 - Jun 2011)
- Muhammad Abid Javed (Jun 2011 - Mar 2013)
- Tariq Sultan (Mar 2009 - May 2009)
- Hassan Nawaz Tarrar (May 2009 - Sep 2009)
- Muzaffar Ali Ranjha (Jul 2005 - May 2008)
- Rana Abdul Rahim (Mar 2009 - Mar 2009)
- Tariq Saleem Dogar (Oct 1999 - Dec 1999)
- Tariq Saadat (Dec 1999 - Jul 2003)
- Shamim Akhtar (Jul 1999 - Sep 1999)
- Ijaz Rasool (Sep 1999 - Oct 1999)
- Kh. Muhammad Naeem (Oct 1997 - Nov 1997)
- Kh. Siddique Akbar (Jan 1998 - Jun 1999)
- Ahmad Naseem (Feb 1997 - May 1997)
- Zubair Latif Bajwa (May 1997 - Oct 1997)
- Zia-ul-Hassan Khan (Jan 1994 - Sep 1995)
- Shaukat Ali Rana (Jul 1999 - Sep 1999)
- Syed Fazal Hussain Shah (Jul 1991 - Oct 1993)
- G.M. Sikandar (Oct 1993 - Jan 1994)
- Safdar Ullah Khan (Aug 1988 - Sep 1989)
- Sardar Muhammad Chaudhry (Sep 1989 - Jun 1991)
- Muhammad Anwar Shariq (Jun 1986 - Feb 1987)
- Jiwan Khan (Jul 1988 - Aug 1988)
- Syed Sarfraz Hussain (Feb 1983 - May 1986)
- Tariq Sultan (May 1986 - Jun 1986)
- Ali Zulqarnain (Jul 1979 - Aug 1982)
- Azmat Ullah Khan (Aug 1982 - Feb 1983)
- Bashir Ahmed Malik (Sep 1976 - Jul 1978)
- Muhammad Azam Qazi (Jul 1978 - Jul 1979)
