= Federal Secretary =

Secretary to the Government of Pakistan

The Federal Secretary (also referred to as the Secretary to the Government of Pakistan) is the highest-ranking position in the Government of Pakistan, occupied by the most senior civil servant in a specific ministry or division. The secretary is the administrative head of that ministry or division and oversees and enforces public policy matters. The authority for the creation of this post solely rests with the Cabinet of Pakistan. The position holder is a BPS-22 grade officer, usually belonging to the Pakistan Administrative Service.

The federal secretaries are the highest-ranking government officials in Pakistan

All promotions and appointments to this rank and post are directly made by the prime minister of Pakistan. The post of federal secretary is equivalent to that of chief secretary of a provincial government (within their respective provinces) and to the rank of General in the Pakistan Army, Air Chief Marshal in the Pakistan Air Force, and Admiral in the Pakistan Navy.

Due to the importance of their respective assignments, there are twelve specific federal secretaries which are considered to be the most vital in the Government of Pakistan. These include the establishment secretary (responsible for civil service matters), finance secretary (responsible for the country's treasury), secretary to the prime minister (responsible for Prime Minister's Office), cabinet secretary (responsible for the Cabinet Division), interior secretary (responsible for law and order), commerce secretary (responsible for trade), foreign secretary (responsible for foreign relations), maritime secretary (responsible for ports and shipping), power secretary (responsible for the electricity and power sector), planning and development secretary (responsible for development projects), petroleum secretary (responsible for the petroleum sector), and industry secretary (responsible for industrial development).

== Powers and responsibilities ==
The federal secretary is the administrative head of the ministry or division, and oversees all matters of policy and administration within the ministry or /division.

The role of secretary is as follows:

- To act as the administrative head of the ministry or division. The responsibility in this regard is complete and undivided.
- To act as the chief adviser to the prime minister on all aspects of policy and administrative affairs.
- To represent the ministry or division before the Standing Committees of the Parliament.

== Perception and image ==
The federal secretaries are the most senior and experienced officers in the country and are largely considered to be the most powerful individuals in the government. Promotion to the rank of federal secretary is regarded as a very tough task given the high level of scrutiny taken into place when the promotions are done by the High Powered Selection Board (HPSB) which is chaired by the prime minister. As the career service of federal secretaries and other bureaucrats are immune to the transition of political governments, they are seen as the real policy-makers who govern the country and serve as the spinal cord for the establishment.

== Federal secretary slots ==
- Cabinet Secretary of Pakistan
- Principal Secretary to the President of Pakistan
- Principal Secretary to the Prime Minister of Pakistan
- Establishment Secretary of Pakistan
- Foreign Secretary of Pakistan
- Interior Secretary of Pakistan
- Finance Secretary of Pakistan
- Pakistan Secretary of Economic Affairs
- Maritime Secretary of Pakistan
- Commerce Secretary of Pakistan
- Petroleum Secretary of Pakistan
- Power Secretary of Pakistan
- Planning and Development Secretary of Pakistan
- Information Secretary of Pakistan
- Pakistan Secretary of Defence
- Pakistan Secretary of Water Resources
- Pakistan Secretary of Health
- Pakistan Secretary of Information Technology
- Pakistan Secretary of Communications
- Pakistan Secretary of Education
- National Security Division Secretary
- Pakistan Secretary of Industries and Production
- Pakistan Secretary of Law
- Aviation Secretary of Pakistan
- Secretary Revenue Division of Pakistan
- Secretary of Religious Affairs and Inter-faith Harmony

== Notable federal secretaries ==
- Roedad Khan
- Nargis Sethi
- Tariq Bajwa
- Shehzad Arbab
- Usman Ali Isani
- Nasir Mahmood Khosa
- Rizwan Ahmed
- Azam Suleman Khan
- Syed Abu Ahmad Akif
- Naveed Kamran Baloch
- Babar Yaqoob Fateh Muhammad
- Maroof Afzal
- Shoaib Mir Memon
- Mir Ahmed Bakhsh Lehri
- Sardar Ahmad Nawaz Sukhera
- Muhammad Sualeh Ahmad Faruqi
- Sajjad Saleem Hotiana
- Raja Muhammad Abbas
- Mumtaz Ali Shah
- Kamran Rasool
- Allah Bakhsh Malik
- Arshad Sami Khan
- Syed Munir Husain
- Shahjehan Syed Karim
- Kamran Lashari
- Jawad Rafique Malik
- Sikandar Sultan Raja
- Qudrat Ullah Shahab
- Iqbal Hussain Durrani
- Ghulam Ishaq Khan
- Tasneem Noorani
- Fawad Hasan Fawad
- Rabiya Javeri Agha
- Aftab Ghulam Nabi Kazi
