= Pakistan Export Processing Zone Authority =

- Abbreviation: EPZA
- Formation: 1980
- Type: Governmental organization
- Legal status: Active
- Headquarters: Islamabad, Pakistan
- Region served: Pakistan
- Chairman: Mr. Allah Dino Khawaja
- Parent organization: Ministry of Industries and Production (Pakistan)
- Website: Official Website

The Pakistan Export Processing Zone Authority (EPZA) is an autonomous body established in Pakistan under the administrative control of the Ministry of Industries and Production. It is in charge of organizing, creating, and managing Export Processing Zones (EPZs) across the country and functions in accordance with the EPZA Ordinance 1980. In order to attract domestic and foreign investment in export-oriented sectors, certain locations have been classified as EPZs and offer additional incentives and services. Allah Dino Khawaja currently serves as the EPZA chairman.

== Background ==
The EPZA was established with the intention of advancing industry, luring international investment, and boosting Pakistani exports. By granting numerous advantages including tax breaks, duty-free imports of machinery and raw materials, and streamlined laws and procedures, it creates a climate that is favorable for enterprises. EPZs offer infrastructure, utilities, and support services to help new export-oriented enterprises get off the ground.
