= Javid Husain =

Pakistani diplomat

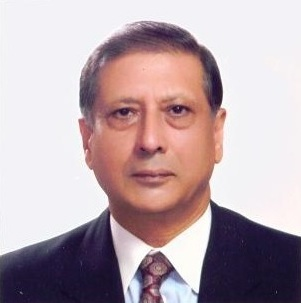

Diplomat, (former) Ambassador of Pakistan to Iran, Republic of Korea, the Netherlands, (former) Permanent Representative of Pakistan to Economic Cooperation Organization

Lahore Council for World Affairs

President
- Incumbent
- Assumed office 2012

Foreign Service Academy, Islamabad, Pakistan

Director-General
- In office September 2003 – March 2004

Pakistan Ambassador to Iran

Permanent Representative of Pakistan to Economic Cooperation Organization
- In office September 1997 – August 2003
- President: Farooq Leghari, Muhammad Rafiq Tarar, Pervez Musharraf
- Prime Minister: Nawaz Sharif, Mir Zafarullah Khan Jamali

Pakistan Ambassador to Republic of Korea
- In office December 1995 – September 1997
- President: Farooq Leghari
- Prime Minister: Benazir Bhutto, Nawaz Sharif

Pakistan Ambassador to The Netherlands
- In office December 1992 – December 1995
- President: Ghulam Ishaq Khan, Farooq Leghari
- Prime Minister: Nawaz Sharif, Benazir Bhutto

Personal details
- Born: 3 March 1944 (age 82) Jhang, British Raj
- Spouse: Shama Husain
- Children: Nadia Imran, Farooq Husain
- Education: Government College, Lahore; University of the Punjab
- Profession: Diplomat/former Ambassador of Pakistan

Javid Husain (Urdu: جاويد حسين; born 3 March 1944) is a Diplomat, from the Foreign Service of Pakistan, who has had a distinguished career during which he served as the Ambassador of Pakistan to the Netherlands (1992–1995), the Republic of Korea (1995–1997) and Iran (1997–2003). During his tenure at Tehran, he was also the Pakistan Permanent Representative to the Economic Cooperation Organization (ECO).

In August 1999, Ambassador Javid Husain was promoted to BPS-22, the highest grade in the Pakistan civil service (equivalent in rank to the Foreign Secretary/Vice Foreign Minister). From January 2003 to March 2004, he was the senior most serving officer of the Foreign Service of Pakistan. His last position within the Foreign Service of Pakistan was as the Head/Director-General of the Foreign Service Academy from 2003 to 2004.

Ambassador Javid Husain is also a published author and a regular columnist, with a focus on International relations, Public policy and Economic development. Currently, he writes frequently for the daily DAWN and the daily The News International newspapers. Previously, he wrote a fortnightly column for the daily The Nation newspaper.

Currently, Ambassador Javid Husain serves as the president of the Lahore Council for World Affairs. He is also Chairman of the Mumtaz Husain Benevolent Trust.

== Education ==
Javid Husain did his B.A. from Government College, Lahore in 1963 securing the first position in the Punjab University. He secured his B.A. (Honours) in economics from Government College, Lahore/Punjab University in 1964 and his M.A. in economics from Punjab University in 1965 with distinctions. From 1975 to 1978, he attended several seminars on international relations at the School of Advanced International Studies (SAIS) of The Johns Hopkins University.

Javid Husain is fluent in English, Persian, Urdu, and Punjabi. He has working knowledge of French, having taken Third and Fourth degree language courses in French at Alliance française in Paris, France. He is also familiar with Arabic.

== Early career ==
Javid Husain, after his initial training in the Pakistani diplomatic service (1967–1968), served on diplomatic assignments in various capitals of the world (in Europe, Africa, & North America) from 1969 to 1978, before returning to Islamabad, Pakistan to serve at the Ministry of Foreign Affairs (Pakistan) from 1978 to 1981. He then again served on foreign diplomatic assignments (in North America & Asia) from 1982 to 1988, before again returning to Islamabad to serve at the Ministry of Foreign Affairs from 1988 to 1992.

=== France ===
From September 1969 to September 1971, he served as Third Secretary in the Embassy of Pakistan, Paris, France.

=== Libya ===
From September 1971 to September 1974, he served as Third Secretary/Second Secretary in the Embassy of Pakistan, Tripoli, Libya.

=== United States ===
From September 1974 to July 1978, he served as First Secretary in the Embassy of Pakistan, Washington, D.C., US

=== Foreign Office, Islamabad ===
==== Director (Afghanistan) ====
From July 1978 to 1980, he served as Director (Afghanistan) of the Pakistan Foreign Office in Islamabad, Pakistan.

==== Director (Foreign Secretary's Office) ====
Later he served as Director (Foreign Secretary's Office) from 1980 to December 1981.

=== United Nations ===
From January 1982 to April 1985, Javid Husain served as Counsellor and later as Minister in the Pakistan Mission to United Nations, New York City where he represented Pakistan in the UN General Assembly and its Third and First Committees besides several other UN bodies/organs like the Security Council, the Disarmament Commission, the Committee on the Indian Ocean as a Zone of Peace, the Commission on the establishment of nuclear weapon-free zones, and the governing bodies of UNICEF, UNFPA, CERD, etc...

=== China ===
From May 1985 till July 1988, Javid Husain served as Minister/Deputy Head of Mission at the Embassy of Pakistan, Beijing, China.

=== Foreign Office, Islamabad ===
==== Director General (UN and EC) ====
From July 1988 to May 1991, Javid Husain served as Director General (United Nations and Economic Coordination) at the Foreign Office in Islamabad, Pakistan. In this role, he supervised all matters relating to the UN and its subsidiary/affiliated organs.

==== Additional Foreign Secretary (UN & Policy Planning) & Official Spokesperson ====
Later, from May 1991 to December 1992, he served as Additional Foreign Secretary/Deputy Foreign Minister supervising both the United Nations and Policy Planning Divisions of the Foreign Office, besides acting as the Official Spokesperson of the Foreign Office.

Participation in International Delegations

During this combined period, he represented Pakistan in numerous conferences/meetings of the United Nations, Non-Aligned Movement, and Organisation of Islamic Cooperation (OIC), as well as bilateral delegations to key countries like the USA & China. These include the following:-

- Member, Pakistan delegation to the Conference on Non-Aligned Foreign Ministers held in Cyprus in September 1988;
- Member, Pakistan delegation to the 43rd Session of the UN General Assembly (1988);
- Member, Pakistan delegation to the 18th Islamic Conference of Foreign Ministers held in Riyadh in March 1989;
- Member, Pakistan delegation to the 9th Non-Aligned Summit Conference held in Belgrade in September 1989;
- Member, Pakistan delegation to the 44th Session of the UN General Assembly (1989);
- Member, Pakistan delegation to the 19th Islamic Conference of Foreign Ministers held in Cairo in August 1990;
- Member, Pakistan delegation to the 45th Session of the UN General Assembly (1990);
- Member, Pakistan delegation to the United States led by Chairman, Pakistan Senate (June 1991);
- Member, Pakistan delegation to China led by chairman, Pakistan Senate (August 1991);
- Member, Pakistan delegation to the Conference of Non-Aligned Foreign Ministers held in Accra in September 1991;
- Member, Pakistan delegation to the 46th Session of the UN General Assembly (1991);
- Member, Pakistan delegation to the Summit Conference of Organization of Islamic Conference held in Dakar in December 1991;
- Member, Pakistan delegation to the Conference of Non-Aligned Foreign Ministers held in Bali, Indonesia in May 1992;
- Represented Pakistan in bilateral talks with Australia at Canberra on Disarmament issues in May 1992;
- Participated in the Workshop on the UN Register on Arms Transfers, organised by the Japanese Government in Tokyo in June 1992;
- Member, Pakistan delegation to the Summit Conference of Non-Aligned countries at Jakarta, Indonesia in August–September 1992;
- Member, Pakistan delegation to the 47th Session of UN General Assembly (1992).

== Ambassadorial career ==
From December 1992, till August 2003, Javid Husain served as an Ambassador of Pakistan to several countries in Europe and Asia.

In August 1999, Ambassador Javid Husain was promoted to BPS-22, the highest grade in the Pakistan civil service (equivalent in rank to the Foreign Secretary/Vice Foreign Minister). From January 2003 till his retirement in March 2004, he was the senior most officer of the Foreign Service of Pakistan.

=== Netherlands ===
Ambassador Javid Husain served as the Ambassador of Pakistan to the Netherlands from December 1992 to December 1995. During this period he also led the Pakistan delegation to the Preparatory Commission for the Organisation for the Prohibition of Chemical Weapons (OPCW).

=== South Korea ===
From December 1995 to September 1997 he served as the Ambassador of Pakistan to South Korea. During this period, he was responsible for arranging the bilateral visit of Prime Minister Benazir Bhutto to South Korea from 22 to 24 July 1996.

=== Iran ===
In September 1997, he assumed charge as the Ambassador of Pakistan to the Islamic Republic of Iran where he served till August 2003. During this period he also served as the Permanent Representative of Pakistan to the Economic Cooperation Organization (ECO).

While posted in Iran, he was responsible for arranging several high-level visits by the leaders of Pakistan and Iran to each other. These include the visits of:

Heads of State & Government

- Prime Minister Nawaz Sharif to Tehran for the OIC Summit from 9 to 11 December 1997;
- Chief Executive General Pervez Musharraf to Tehran from 8 to 9 December 1999;
- President Mohammad Khatami to Islamabad from 23 to 25 December 2002.

Future Head of Government

- Secretary Hassan Rouhani, then secretary of the Iranian Supreme National Security Council, now President of Iran, to Islamabad from 24 to 26 April 2001;
- Secretary Hassan Rouhani to Islamabad on 28 June 2002;

Foreign Ministers

- Foreign Minister Kamal Kharazi to Islamabad on 2 June 1998;
- Foreign Minister Sartaj Aziz to Tehran on 17 September 1998;
- Foreign Minister Kamal Kharazi to Islamabad from 29 to 30 November 2001;
- Foreign Minister Khurshid Mahmud Kasuri to Tehran for the 30th Islamic Conference of Foreign Ministers from 28 to 31 May 2003;

Cabinet Ministers & senior Military/Intelligence officials

- Road & Transportation Minister Mahmoud Hojjati to Islamabad in 2000;
- Commander/Chief of Naval Staff of Pakistan Navy Admiral Abdul Aziz Mirza to Iran in 2000;
- Communications Minister Javed Ashraf Qazi to Tehran in 2001;
- Interior Minister Mousavi Lari to Islamabad in 2001;
- Director General Inter-Services Intelligence Lt. General Mahmud Ahmed to Iran in 2001;
- Interior Minister Moinuddin Haider to Iran in 2002;
- Petroleum Minister Bijan Namdar Zangeneh to Pakistan in 2002;
- Agriculture Minister Mahmoud Hojjati to Pakistan in 2002;
- Science and Technology Minister Dr Atta ur Rahman to Tehran in 2002;

During this period, he also represented Pakistan in numerous conferences/meetings of the ECO and the OIC, as well as bilateral commissions of Pakistan & Iran. These include the following:-

- Member, Pakistan delegation to the 8th OIC Summit held at Tehran in December 1997;
- Member, Pakistan delegation to the 8th ECO Council of Ministers meeting held at Almaty in May 1998;
- Member, Pakistan delegation to the 5th ECO Summit meeting held at Almaty in May 1998;
- Member, Pakistan delegation to the 9th ECO Regional Planning Council meeting held at Istanbul in February 1999;
- Member, Pakistan delegation to the 9th ECO Council of Ministers meeting held at Baku in May 1999;
- Member, Pakistan delegation to the 11th Session of Pakistan-Iran Joint Economic Commission meeting held at Islamabad in May 1999;
- Member, Pakistan delegation to the 10th ECO Regional Planning Council meeting held at Tehran in February 2000;
- Member, Pakistan delegation to the 10th ECO Council of Ministers meeting held at Tehran in June 2000;
- Member, Pakistan delegation to the 6th ECO Summit held at Tehran in June 2000;
- Member, Pakistan delegation to the 9th OIC Summit held at Doha (Qatar) in November 2000;
- Leader, Pakistan delegation to the 11th ECO Regional Planning Council meeting held at Tehran in February 2001;
- Member, Pakistan delegation to the 11th ECO Council of Ministers meeting held at Dushanbe in April 2001;
- Leader, Pakistan delegation to the 12th ECO Regional Planning Council meeting held at Tehran in March 2002;
- Member, Pakistan delegation to the 8th ECO Summit held at Istanbul in October 2002;
- Leader, Pakistan delegation to the 13th ECO Regional Planning Council meeting held at Tehran in April 2003;
- Leader, Pakistan delegation to the Senior Officials Meeting preceding the 30th Islamic Conference of Foreign Ministers, held at Jeddah in April 2003;
- Member, Pakistan delegation to the 13th meeting of the ECO Council of Ministers' meeting held at Bishkek in June 2003.

=== Foreign Service Academy ===
Following his return to Islamabad, he served as the Head/Director-General of the Foreign Service Academy from September 2003 to March 2004.

=== Economic Cooperation Organization – Eminent Persons Group ===
In 2004, he represented Pakistan in the Economic Cooperation Organization (ECO) Eminent Persons Group, which had been mandated by the Organization to look into ways and means of improving the ECO's efficiency and effectiveness in the achievement of its goals and objectives.

== Post-ambassadorial career ==
Since his retirement from the Foreign Service of Pakistan, Ambassador Javid Husain has continued to remain engaged with diplomacy, both as a special envoy/representative for Pakistan in various forums, as well as in the role of the president of the Lahore Council for World Affairs.

He has also been engaged in academic and scholarly activities. He is a regular columnist and contributor to national dailies/journals, and frequently gives lectures at prestigious institutions.

In addition, he has been engaged in social welfare activities in Pakistan, with a focus on provision of accessible health-care and education.

=== Special Envoy ===
At the end of January 2005, Ambassador Javid Husain attended the African Union Summit at Abuja, Nigeria as the Special Envoy of the President of Pakistan to convey to African leaders Pakistan's point of view on the reform and expansion of the UN Security Council.

In February 2009, at the invitation of the OIC Secretary General, he attended a consultative meeting at Jeddah on the establishment of the OIC Independent Permanent Commission on Human Rights.

=== ASEAN Regional Forum – Experts and Eminent Persons ===
From 2006 to 2008, Ambassador Javid Husain represented Pakistan in the ASEAN Regional Forum's Experts and Eminent Persons (ARF EEP's) group. He attended the following meetings of the ARF EEPs as a representative of Pakistan:

- 1st meeting of the ARF EEPs – Jeju Island, South Korea – 29–30 June 2006;
- 2nd meeting of the ARF EEPs – Manila, Philippines – 5–6 February 2007;
- 3rd meeting of the ARF EEPs – Beijing, China – 13–15 November 2008.

=== Academic and Scholarly activities ===
In October 2015, Ambassador Javid Husain was appointed a visiting scholar at the South Asia Institute at The University of Texas at Austin.

Ambassador Javid Husain has been writing articles for journals and Pakistani dailies like the DAWN and The Nation. Currently he writes a fortnightly column for the daily The Nation.

He also delivers lectures at prestigious Universities (like the University of Punjab, and Lahore University of Management Sciences), think tanks (like the Institute of Strategic Studies Islamabad, Center for South Asian Studies at the University of the Punjab and the World Affairs Council of Houston), and training institutions (like the Pakistan National Management College) on foreign policy issues.

In addition, he also frequently appears on TV news & current affairs shows as an expert to discuss foreign policy and economic issues.

=== Lahore Council for World Affairs ===
Ambassador Javid Husain was elected as the president of the Lahore Council for World Affairs in May 2012.

Under his supervision, the council has organised a number of panel discussions on such subjects as post-2014 Afghanistan, liberalisation of Pakistan-India trade, etc... He has also organised the council's meetings with visiting scholars from abroad.

Under his direction, the Council signed a Memorandum of Understanding (MoU) with the University of Punjab in April 2013 on mutual collaboration in the organisation of seminars and workshops on foreign policy issues.

=== Mumtaz Husain Benevolent Trust ===
Since June 2007, Ambassador Javid Husain has been the Chairman of the Mumtaz Husain Benevolent Trust (MHBT), which is engaged in social welfare activities in Pakistan.

Under his supervision the Trust has been running a free dispensary in Jhang, in southern Punjab, since 2008; and has been providing scholarships to needy students in Chenab College, Jhang since 2011.

He also directed the flood-relief efforts that MHBT undertook in Jhang district in August 2010.

== Major publications ==
=== Books ===
- "Pakistan and a World in Disorder – A Grand Strategy for the Twenty-First Century", published by Palgrave Macmillan US.
- "Post 9/11 International Scenario", published in "Post 9/11 Globe" by the Centre for South Asian Studies, University of the Punjab.

=== Papers ===
- "The Process of Foreign Policy Formulation in Pakistan", published by PILDAT.

=== Articles ===
- Articles published in the quarterly The Criterion.
- Current articles in the daily DAWN.
- Current articles in the daily The News.
- Fortnightly column in the daily The Nation.

== Notes ==
Diplomatic posts
Preceded by Khalid Mahmood	Pakistan Ambassador to Iran; 1997–2003	Succeeded by Iqbal Ahmed Khan
Preceded by Khalid Mahmood	Permanent Representative of Pakistan to ECO; 1997–2003	Succeeded by Iqbal Ahmed Khan
Preceded by Iftikhar Murshed	Pakistan Ambassador to South Korea; 1995–1997	Succeeded by Tariq Osman Hyder
Preceded by Izhar-ul-Haq	Pakistan Ambassador to the Netherlands; 1992–1995	Succeeded by Admiral (retd.) Saeed Khan
