= Hussain Asghar =

Pakistani civil servant

Deputy Chairman National Accountability Bureau
- Incumbent
- Assumed office April 2019
- Appointed by: Arif Alvi

Chairman Anti-Corruption Commission
- Incumbent
- Assumed office June 2019 - End 2021
- Appointed by: Imran Khan

Personal details
- Born: Islamic Republic of Pakistan
- Occupation: Police officer

Hussain Asghar is a retired Pakistani police officer who serves as Deputy Chairman National Accountability Bureau, appointed and took charge in April 2019. Asghar is member of the 15th CTP and is batchmates with Sikandar Sultan Raja, Rizwan Ahmed, Allah Dino Khawaja and Jawad Rafique Malik and retired from active police service in BPS-22 grade. Asghar has previously served as Inspector General of Police in the Government of Gilgit-Baltistan and as Director Federal Investigation Agency.

== Career ==
Hussain Asghar serves as the deputy chairman of Pakistan's National Accountability Bureau, in office since April 2019. He also heads the anti-corruption commission constituted by Prime Minister Imran Khan in June 2019.

Before retirement from active police service, Asghar was serving as head of the anti-corruption establishment in the province of Punjab.

Asghar has previously also served as Inspector General of Police in the Government of Gilgit-Baltistan and as Director in the Federal Investigation Agency.
