= Shamim Akhtar =

Pakistani politician

Shamim Akhtar Abbasi

Personal details
- Born: 9 March 1954 (age 72) Haripur, Punjab, Pakistan
- Party: Pakistan Muslim League (Nawaz)

Shamim Akhtar (Urdu: شمیم اختر; born on 9 March 1954) is a Pakistani politician who was Minister Provincial Assembly (MPA) Punjab, Pakistan from 2013 to 2018.

== Early life and education ==
She was born on 9 March 1954 in Lahore. She completed matriculation level education.
