= Education Secretary of Pakistan =

Administrative post of the ministry of Education and Professional Training

- Reports to: Education Minister of Pakistan
- Appointer: Prime Minister of Pakistan
- Website: Ministry of Federal Education

The Education Secretary of Pakistan is the Federal Secretary for Ministry of Federal Education and Professional Training. The position is occupied by a BPS-22 grade officer, usually belonging to the Pakistan Administrative Service.

The Secretary heads the Ministry which is mandated to formulate policy direction for the preparation and training of the country's manpower to meet national and international demands for skilled workforce. After the Eighteenth Amendment to the Constitution of Pakistan in 2010, the subject of education was devolved from the federal government to the provincial governments, which has drastically reduced the powers and mandate of the Federal Education Secretary.

== The Secretary ==
The current Education Secretary is Nadeem Mahbub.

== See also ==
- Health Secretary of Pakistan
- Foreign Secretary of Pakistan
- Finance Secretary of Pakistan
- Defence Secretary of Pakistan
- Ministry of Federal Education and Professional Training
