= Syed Abu Ahmad Akif =

Pakistani civil servant

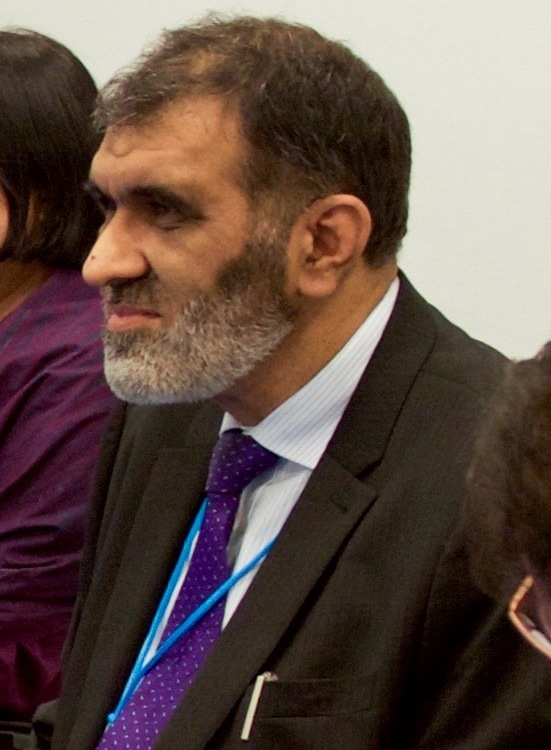
- Akif in a meeting with Secretary John Kerry in 2016

Cabinet Secretary of Pakistan
- In office June 2018 – August 2018
- Appointed by: Nasirul Mulk

Federal Secretary for Climate Change
- In office February 2016 – June 2018
- Appointed by: Nawaz Sharif

Personal details
- Education: University of Hawaii; National Defence University; University of Karachi
- Occupation: Career Bureaucrat

Syed Abu Ahmad Akif is a retired Pakistani civil servant who served in BPS-22 grade as the Cabinet Secretary and Climate Change Secretary of Pakistan. Akif belongs to the Pakistan Administrative Service and was promoted to the rank of Federal Secretary by Prime Minister Nawaz Sharif in 2016. A topper of the 1982 CSS examinations, Akif is known for his performance as Director General of Pakistan's Hajj mission in Saudi Arabia from 2010 to 2015 and later as the country's longest serving Climate Change Secretary.

== Education ==
Akif appeared for the highly competitive civil service examination in 1982 and secured the first position in Pakistan. In the subsequent training at the Civil Services Academy, Syed Akif was declared the Best All Round Trainee Officer. He obtained two master's degrees from University of Karachi in 1985 and 1987 respectively. In 1998, Syed Akif received a fully funded degree fellowship at the East West Center Hawai’i (University of Hawaii) that led to a master's degree in public administration. Again becoming a full-time student in 2009, he completed the master's program in defence and strategic studies from the National Defence University, Islamabad.

== Career and other activities ==
Syed Akif belongs to the Pakistan Administrative Service and retired from the high-profile position of Cabinet Secretary of Pakistan from June 2018 to August 2018. He was promoted to the rank of Federal Secretary in 2016 and was posted as Secretary for the Ministry of Climate Change where he served for 23 months. This was a period of immense activity in the field. Under his supervision, Pakistani ratified the Paris Climate Agreement, submitted its INDCs, signed the Kigali Amendment to the Montreal Protocol, and declared its first Marine Protected Area at Astola Island. Together with the Minister for Climate Change, he helped see the passage of the Climate Change Act through multi-partisan support in parliament, setting up the Pakistan Climate Change Authority. From there he was posted as Secretary, Ministry of Inter Provincial Coordination for five months. In that capacity he was also Secretary of the Council of Common Interests, a Constitutional body.

Before his elevation to the grade 22, he served for five years as Director-General of Pakistan's Hajj mission in Saudi Arabia. Syed Akif has also previously served in the provincial governments of Sindh and Balochistan. After retiring from active government service in August 2018, Akif was offered and accepted a position as a Member of the Prime Minister's Inspection Commission where he served for over three years. In March 2022, he was appointed as Director General of the National Rahmatul-lil-Alameen Authority.

On 23 March 2019, Akif was bestowed with an honor that is rare for civil servants: the Sitara-i-Imtiaz (or Star of Distinction), the third highest civil award in that category.

Syed Akif is also a writer, editor, and translator of several books which include the following: [Book Authored]: Captive in Afghanistan, Lahore, Ferozsons, 1999, pp. [first person narrative of a Pakistani caught in the crossfire of the Afghan turmoil]

Syed Akif takes a keen personal interest in intellectual dialogue and writing and non-profit activities. In the latter role, he is a board member of the University of Management & Technology (# 1 in research ranking in Pakistan) as well as a foundational board member of Taleem Foundation, an organization that he co-founded in 1992. The Foundation set up and operates eight schools in under-served areas of Balochistan. He remained a vice-president of both the Pakistan Tennis Federation as well as Adventure Foundation Pakistan as well as being a National Commissioner of the Pakistan Boy Scouts He led the first-ever Students Goodwill Delegation to India (1980) and in 1989 he founded the Pakistan Scrabble Association; his effort led to several junior world champions. AKif was the vice-president, East-West Center Participants’ Association, Hawaii (1999) and is currently the head of the EWC Alumni Assn., Islamabad Chapter. He has remained a program presenter for radio and TV with over 50 TV appearances including a 30 part series titled Values & Tenets of Islam (2010) and a 20-part series, Islam Today on Pakistan Television (2002–03). Currently, he hosts an oral history series at the Institute of Policy Studies under the title Living Scripts which documents the lives and times of leading Pakistani civil servants; so far more than 30 sessions (each of more than two hours have been recorded).

== See also ==
- Government of Pakistan
- Pakistan Administrative Service
- Grade 22
