= Allah Bakhsh Malik =

Pakistani social scientist and author

Dr. Allah Bakhsh Malik is a Pakistani social scientist, public policy advisor, academic, researcher and author with experience in management, education, institutional and human development. He studied at Cambridge University, Punjab University, and Columbia University. He joined the Civil Service of Pakistan in 1985 through CSS. He was conferred UNESCO Confucius Prize in 2011 in recognition of his contributions and services in education sector in Pakistan. He is the first Pakistani and the Muslim recipient of Confucius Award. Dr. Malik is PhD in Economics and post doctorate in Economics of Education from University of London and Columbia University USA.

He founded Punjab Education Foundation and Punjab Small Industries Corporation. As the first MD and CEO of PEF, he introduced public private partnership in education. He introduced Education Voucher Scheme and Foundation Assisted Schools and the model was replicated in many countries including Philippines and Commonwealth countries. https://www.academia.edu/1. He served as Director General National commission for Human Development Pakistan and Academy for Educational Planning and Management now renamed as PIE. https://tribune.com.pk/story/752395/mdgs-goals-president-calls-for-steps-to-achieving-education-targets. He is founder of Quaid e Azam Academy for Educational Development, an institution for teachers training in Pakistan https://www.developmentaid.org/organizations/view/508525/qaed-academy-punjab.

Malik was the Education Secretary of Pakistan from 2017 to 2019. He also served as the Health Secretary of Pakistan. While representing Global Partnership for Education - The World Bank, for Asia Pacific Region, he contributed towards affordable quality education for the less affluent areas and focused on girls education. https://www.flickr.com/photos/gpforeducation/33038394062

Malik served as Secretary Literacy and Non Formal Basic Education, Youth Affairs, Tourism and Archaeology departments. He was Secretary Education for the province of Punjab and Federal Government. He served as Member and acting Chairman of Punjab Public Service Commission. Currently he is serving as Rector/VC of Ghazi National Institute of Engineering and Sciences Dera Ghazi Khan.

Malik represented Pakistan and Asia–Pacific nations on the board of Global Partnership for Education (GPE) with the World Bank for three years.

== Publications ==
1. Malik, A. B (2003). Roshan Chiragh Urdu Biography of Late Malik Ghulam Hussain Awan RA.

2. Malik, A.B. (2003). The Higher Education in Pakistan. Maqbool Academy, Urdu Bazar Lahore.

3. Malik, A.B, (2003). The Institutional Development Matrix. Maqbool Academy, Lahore.

4. Malik, A.B, (2004). The Champions of Change. The Institutional Development and Change Management in Educational Sector – The Role of Teacher. Pan graphics Islamabad.

5. Malik, A.B (2005). Punjab Education Foundation Rules and Regulations 2006

6. Malik, A.B (2005). Punjab Education Foundation Public Private Partnership Instruments

7. Malik, A.B (2005). The Foundations of Success. The Impact Study of Early Childhood Education and Development on the Personality of Child. Tariq Printers Lahore.

8. Malik, A. B (2006). The Human Development Nexus – Professional Development Nexus –Professional Development and Capacity Building in Public Private Partnership. Maqbool Academy, Lahore.

9. Malik, A. B (2006). Education Voucher Scheme (PEF-EVS. Punjab Education Foundation Lahore.

10. Malik, A. B. (2006c). Sources of Educational Finance: Affordable Quality Education in Public Private Partnership: Paper Presented in Stakeholders Forum on December 11 at 16th Commonwealth Conference of Education Ministers (16th CCEM) in Cape Town, South Africa in December (8–14), 2006, Punjab Education Foundation Lahore.

11. Malik, A. B (2007 a). The Freedom of Choice – Affordable Quality Education in Public Private Partnership. Maqbool Academy, Lahore.

12. Malik, A. B (2007 b). Non-State Provision – Sustainable Quality Education in Public Private Partnership. Paper presented at 9th UKFIET, Oxford, United Kingdom on September (11–13), 2007.

13. Malik, A.B (2008 a). Poorest of the poor being constrained by social economic variables, May 25, 2008, The Nation, Pakistan. https://nation.com.pk/25-May-2008/poorest-of-the-poor-being-constrained-by-social-economic-variables.

14. Malik, A. B (2008 b), Gaining Educational Equity through Promotion of Quality Education at Affordable Cost in Public Private Partnership, Occasional Paper No 154, National Centre for the Study of Privatization of Education (NCSPE), Teachers College, Columbia University, New York, USA

15. Malik, A. B (2008 c) Module for Professional Development and Capacity Building of Educational Managers of Punjab, MSD, GCU, Lahore.

16. Malik, A, B (2008 d). Pakistan may fail to achieve MDG and EFA Goals, May 11, 2008, The Nation Pakistan. https://nation.com.pk/11-May-2008/pakistan-may-fail-to-achieve-mdgs-and-efa-targets

17. Malik, A. B (2009) Human Resource Development Strategy for Pakistan: A Case Study of WAPDA. National Management College, NSPP, Lahore.

18. Malik, A. B (2009) Indo-US Nuclear Agreement: Challenges for Pakistani Diplomats, National Management College, NSPP, Lahore.

19. Malik, A. B (2008) Punjab Sustainable Strategy Development Paper.

20. Malik, A. B (2009) Public-private Partnerships in Education: Lessons Learned from The Punjab Education Foundation, Asian Development Bank Manila Philippines

21. Malik, A. B (2010) Five Year Strategy Plan for Education (2010 - 2015) UNESCO, Pakistan.

22. Malik, A. B (2010) Ten Year Strategy Plan for Education (2010 - 2020) JICA, Pakistan.

23. Malik, A. B (2011) Public Policy, Governance and Economic Development in Pakistan: Issues and Challenges - Learning from the Best International Practices.

24. Malik, A. B (2011) Adult Literacy with Vocational Skills for Adult Illiterate in Punjab: an effective Intervention for Skills Development - Adult Education and Development: DVV International ISSN 0342-7633

25. Malik, A. B (2012) Literacy and Vocational Skill Training in Punjab: Changing Lives through effective Government Intervention, Commonwealth Education Partnership, ISBN 978-0-9563060-6-7

26. Malik, A.B (2011): Policy Analysis of Education in Punjab Province 2011 http://unesco.org.pk/education/documents/situationanalysis/Education_Policy_Analysis_for_Punjab.pdf.

27. Malik, A.B (2011): Education Matters: Policy Analysis and State of Education ISBN 978-969-510-419-4

28. Malik, A.B (2011): Organizational Assessment Manual to conduct examinations for secondary and higher secondary levels by Boards of Intermediate and Secondary Education, Higher Education Department.

29. Malik, A.B (2012): Punjab Youth Policy 2012 http://newblankets.org/Malik/PYP_2012.pdf.

30. Malik, A.B (2012): Joining Hands to Identify New Roads for Poverty Alleviation – Caritas Macau China ISBN 978-99937-644-5-8

31. Malik, A. B (2013): Affordable Quality Education in Philippines: Fund for Assistance for Private Education.

32. Malik, A. B (2013): Public Private Partnership in Education: Low Cost Private Schools in Less-Privileged Areas in South Africa.

33. Malik, A. B (2013): Global Goal Setting: Partnerships and Innovative Resourcing in Education: Commonwealth Education Partnerships: http://www.cedol.org/wp-content/uploads/2013/11/8-Global-goal-setting.pdf.

34. Malik, A. B (2013): Going Global: Skills for Employability in Pakistan. What Works and Why?.

35. Malik, A. B (2013): Education Above All: World Innovative Summit on Education Doha Qatar.

36. Malik, A. B (2013): Improving Mathematics Education in South Africa: Learning from the Best International Practices: Studies on PISA, PIRLS and TIMSS and Possibility of Replication.

37. Malik, A. B (2013): Bringing Learning Home and Developing Partnerships: Replication of Best Technical Educational Models Around the Globe, Casablanca, Morocco.

38. Malik, A. B (2014 a): Technical and Vocational Education: Empowerment through Skills and Innovation, The British Council United Kingdom.

39. Malik, A. B (2014 b): Cross-Pollinating Knowledge: International Strategic Partnerships in Research and Education: INSPIRE Conference II Leicester University United Kingdom February 28, 2014.

40. Malik, A. B (2014 c): Achievements Levels of EFA: Goals and Strategy Evolved for Accelerated Achievements of EFA Goals by 2015. Academy for Education Planning and Management, Ministry of Education, Trainings and Standards in Higher Education, Government of Pakistan Islamabad. ISBN 978-969-444-085-0

41. Malik, A. B (2015: Professional Development of Teachers to Impact Learning for All. Academy for Education Planning and Management, Ministry of Education, Trainings and Standards in Higher Education, Government of Pakistan Islamabad. ISBN 978-969-4444-084-3

42. Malik, A. B (2015): National TVET Policy, National Vocational and Technical Training Commission, Government of Pakistan. https://planipolis.iiep.unesco.org/sites/planipolis/files/ressources/pakistan_national_tvet_policy_draft_consultation_2014.pdf.

43. Malik, A. B (2016): Pakistan Education Atlas 2014. Academy for Education Planning and Management, Ministry of Education, Trainings and Standards in Higher Education, Government of Pakistan Islamabad.

44. Malik, A. B (2017): Unfinished Agenda of Education in Pakistan: The Way Forward; International education Conference March 29, 2014, Academy for Education Planning and Management, Ministry of Education, Trainings and Standards in Higher Education, Government of Pakistan Islamabad. ISBN 978-969-4444-088-0

45. Malik, A.B (2018): The Punjab Early Childhood Education (ECE) Policy 2017, Government of the Punjab, School Education Department PMIU - PESRP, Pakistan.

46. Malik, A.B (2019). The Politics of Education Reforms, National Defence University Islamabad, ISSRA Papers (Volume, XI Issue, 1, 2019).

47. Malik, A. B (2020): Review of Pakistan's National and Provincial Education Policy Regimes to Strengthen Education to Out of Schools Children. Alight Pakistan and American Refugee Council Washington DC USA.

48. Malik, A. B (2020): Education Should Reach Every Home. The Daily Times, July 3, 2020,

49. Malik, A. B (2020): Education Should Reach Every Home, The Pakistan Today, July 5, 2020
