= Establishment Secretary =

Post in federal government of Pakistan

Establishment Secretary of Pakistan
- معتمدِ قیام پاکستان
- Incumbent; Nabeel Awan
- Reports to: Prime Minister of Pakistan
- Seat: Islamabad
- Appointer: Prime Minister of Pakistan
- Website: Establishment Division

The Establishment Secretary of Pakistan is the Federal Secretary for the Establishment Division and is in charge of the transfers, postings as well as promotions in the country's civil service. The position holder is a BPS-22 Officer, usually belonging to the Pakistan Administrative Service. The Establishment Secretary reports directly to the Prime Minister of Pakistan. The current Establishment Secretary is Nabeel Awan.

The Establishment Secretary has a key role in recommending to the Prime Minister the right official for the right job in all Ministries, Divisions and Departments. According to the Civil Service Manual, the Establishment Secretary has the authority to single-handedly appoint or transfer officers up to Grade-20. A summary to the Prime Minister is sent only for Grades-21 and 22. Since the Prime Minister is the competent authority, he sends back the summary to the Establishment Division, where the Establishment Secretary issues the notification.

The Establishment Secretary has a direct say in the promotion of civil servants from Grade-17, all the way to Grade 22. The only other official with such discretionary powers is that of Cabinet Secretary; who is the chair of the Civil Service. This role in promotions and postings makes the office highly influential.

== See also ==
- Government of Pakistan
- Federal Secretary
- Pakistan Administrative Service
- Interior Secretary of Pakistan
- Cabinet Secretary of Pakistan
- Finance Secretary of Pakistan
