= Allah Dino Khawaja =

Pakistani Police Officer

- Federal Secretary for Ministry of Human Rights
- In office August 2023 – May 2025
- Appointed by: Anwaar ul Haq Kakar

Commandant National Police Academy
- In office August 2021 – August 2023
- Appointed by: Imran Khan

Karachi Member of Federal Ombudsman Secretariat
- In office September 2020 – August 2021
- Appointed by: Imran Khan

Federal Secretary for Ministry of Narcotics Control
- In office February 2020 – September 2020
- Appointed by: Imran Khan

Inspector General of Motorway & National Highways Police
- In office September 2018 – February 2020
- Appointed by: Imran Khan

Inspector General of Sindh Police
- In office 14 March 2016 – 13 June 2018
- Appointed by: Nawaz Sharif

Personal details
- Born: 24 April 1965 (age 61) Tando Muhammad Khan
- Children: Aziz Ali Khowaja
- Education: Cadet College Petaro; University of Sindh

Allah Dino Khawaja (a.k.a. A.D. Khawaja) (Sindhi: الله ڏنو خواجا) is a retired Pakistani Police Officer BPS-22 grade who is currently serving as Chairman Pakistan Export Processing Zone Authority (EPZA). He previously served as the Federal Secretary for Ministry of Human Rights. Khawaja is batchmates with prominent bureaucrats namely Fawad Hasan Fawad (PAS), Rizwan Ahmed (PAS), Sikandar Sultan Raja (PAS) and Hussain Asghar (PSP).

Khawaja had taken some key decisions and implemented the National Action Plan of Pakistan and Karachi operation during his tenure as Inspector General of Sindh Police from March 2016 to June 2018. In February 2020, Khawaja earned the rare honour for a police officer to head a federal ministry when he was posted as Federal Secretary for Narcotics Control, an office he held for 7 months.

== Early life and family ==
Khawaja belongs to a village in Tando Muhammad Khan district. He was enrolled in Cadet College Petaro, from where he completed his Intermediate in 1982. After that, Khawaja completed his Master’s in Criminology from University of Sindh. Khawaja is known to have only one son.

== Career ==
A.D. Khawaja has served as SSP in various districts of Sindh and worked in Karachi as DIG in districts South and East. He was posted as Additional IG Special Branch before he was made IG. He also rendered his services in Intelligence Bureau (IB) as a Joint Director and Director.

He was also posted as DIG for telecommunication and Director for Sindh’s Anti-corruption department. Khawaja also worked as Personal Staff Officer (PSO) for two chief ministers, Syed Muzaffar Hussain Shah and Syed Abdullah Ali Shah.

A.D Khawaja was appointed to the position of IGP Sindh in March 2016 and served as the provincial top cop till June 2018. In September 2018, Prime Minister Imran Khan appointed Khawaja as the Inspector General of the National Highways & Motorway Police where he served till February 2020.

In February 2020, A.D Khawaja earned the rare honour for a police officer to head a federal ministry when he was posted as Federal Secretary for Narcotics Control, by Imran Khan, an office he held for a period of 7 months.

Khawaja has also served as the Commandant of the National Police Academy in Islamabad.

A.D Khawaja was the first Sindhi in the history of Pakistan to be appointed as a Federal Secretary as well as the first ever Pakistani Police Officer to be appointed as a Federal Secretary twice. A.D Khawaja also served as the Federal Secretary for the Ministry of Human Rights. Khawaja is currently serving as Chairman EPZA Pakistan.

== See also ==
- Central Superior Services
