= Petroleum Secretary of Pakistan =

Administrative post of the Ministry of Energy

- معتمدِ پٹرولیم پاکستان
- Incumbent; Momin Agha
- Appointer: Prime Minister of Pakistan
- Website: Petroleum Division

The Petroleum Secretary of Pakistan (Urdu: معتمدِ پٹرولیم پاکستان) is the Federal Secretary for Ministry of Energy (Petroleum Division). The officer is a BPS-22 grade officer, usually belonging to the Pakistan Administrative Service. The Secretary Petroleum is considered to be a highly lucrative and prized post in the Government of Pakistan. The Secretary heads the Division which is responsible to ensure availability and security of sustainable supply of oil and gas for economic development and strategic requirements of Pakistan, and to coordinate development of natural resources of energy and minerals. Mega-sized companies such as the Pakistan Petroleum Limited (PPL), Oil and Gas Development Company (OGDC) and Pakistan State Oil (PSO) come under the purview of Secretary Petroleum.

== See also ==
- Government of Pakistan
- Commerce Secretary of Pakistan
- Pakistan Secretary of Economic Affairs
