= Shahjehan Syed Karim =

Pakistani civil servant and educator

Shahjehan Syed Karim (1933–2017) was a Pakistani civil servant who served as the chief secretary of Sindh in 1994. He also founded the Institute of Business Management.

== Early life and education ==
Syed Karim was born in Patna, Bihar, British India. He completed his higher education at Aligarh University. Karim obtained a master's degree in political science from the University of Arizona in the United States.

== Career ==
In 1957, Karim qualified for Central Superior Services (CSS) exam and began his career in civil service. He held various administrative positions, including deputy commissioner, commissioner, secretary, federal secretary, chairperson of Pakistan Television, and chairperson of the Pakistan Broadcasting Corporation (Radio Pakistan). He served as the chief secretary of Sindh province until his retirement in 1994.

After retiring from civil service, Karim established the Institute of Business Management (IoBM), a private business school in Karachi.
