= Tasneem Noorani =

Pakistani civil servant and newspaper columnist

Interior Secretary of Pakistan
- In office January 2001 – May 2004

Personal details
- Party: Pakistan Tehreek-e-Insaf (until 2016)
- Education: Pakistan Air Force School Sargodha University of the Punjab Iran Centre of Management Studies
- Profession: Civil Servant

Tasneem Noorani is a retired Pakistani civil servant who has served in BPS-22 grade as the Interior Secretary and Commerce Secretary of Pakistan.

== Education ==
Tasneem attended Pakistan Air Force School Sargodha for high school from 1956 to 1960. He holds a master's degree in geology from University of the Punjab, Lahore where he studied from 1962 to 1966. After joining the civil service, he got a degree in finance from Iran Centre of Management Studies Tehran in 1979.

== Career ==
From January 2001 to May 2004, Tasneem Noorani served as the Interior Secretary of Pakistan in Pervez Musharraf's regime.

Noorani has also served as Commerce Secretary of Pakistan and Pakistan Secretary of Industries and Production. On deputation, he served as Charge d'affaires & Trade Commissioner, Pakistan Embassy - Singapore.

He remained Commissioner Faisalabad Division In Punjab Government. He also served as Deputy Commissioner Dera Ghazi Khan. He remained Director civil services academy (CSA) Lahore and Chairman Punjab Liquidation board, Lahore. He also served as Secretary, Planning and Development board, Punjab. At the start of his career, he served as Assistant Commissioner Bhalwal, Chunian and Shakargarh tehsils.

After retirement from his civil service career, Noorani joined the Pakistani political party Pakistan Tehreek-e-Insaf and served as the party's chief election commissioner, but left the party in 2016 after some differences with the party chief Imran Khan.

Tasneem Noorani now serves as a Member of the Board of Directors of Pakistan Industrial Development Corporation. Before this, he had served as a Director of Karachi Electric Supply Company.

== See also ==
- Tasneem Noorani foundation
