= Sikandar Sultan Raja =

Chief Election Commissioner of Pakistan

Sikandar Sultan Raja سکندر سلطان راجہ

Election Commission of Pakistan
- Incumbent
- Assumed office 27 January 2020
- Appointed by: Arif Alvi

Railways Secretary of Pakistan
- In office November 2018 – December 2019
- Appointed by: Imran Khan

Petroleum Secretary of Pakistan
- In office 18 April 2017 – 26 August 2018
- Appointed by: Nawaz Sharif

Chief Secretary of Azad Kashmir
- In office January 2016 – April 2017
- Appointed by: Nawaz Sharif

Chief Secretary of Gilgit-Baltistan
- In office April 2014 – April 2015
- Appointed by: Nawaz Sharif

Additional Chief Secretary of Punjab
- In office January 2012 – May 2012
- Appointed by: Shehbaz Sharif

Personal details
- Born: Bhera, Punjab, Pakistan
- Spouse: Rabab Sikandar
- Children: 2
- Parent: Sultan Ahmed
- Occupation: Career bureaucrat

Sikandar Sultan Raja is a retired Pakistani civil servant who is the current Chief Election Commissioner of Pakistan since January 2020. He is the son-in-law of the former Principal Secretary to the Prime Minister and Chief Secretary Sindh Saeed Mehdi. As a civil servant, Raja belonged to the Pakistan Administrative Service.

Raja retired from civil service in BPS-22 grade in 2019, having worked in senior bureaucratic positions such as the Railways Secretary, Petroleum Secretary, States and Frontier Regions Secretary, Aviation Secretary, additional Chief Secretary of Punjab, and Chief Secretary of both Azad Kashmir and Gilgit-Baltistan.

Raja was appointed as the chief election commissioner by President Arif Alvi in January 2020. His tenure as chief election commissioner ended on 8 January 2025, however he has continued to serve the position until the appointment of his successor.

Raja's tenure as Chief Election Commissioner has been marked by controversies, particularly over the ECP's conduct of the 2024 general election. Domestic and international media outlets, as well as political figures, raised allegations of electoral irregularities and rigging, and questioned the transparency of the electoral process, which Raja and the ECP rejected. His continuation in office beyond the expiry of his five-year term has also drawn criticism, with opponents questioning the legal basis for his extended tenure. Raja has also faced allegations of favouring the PML-N and scrutiny over his wife's promotion to grade 22, allegedly linked to favouritism.

== Family ==
Raja is also related to Amir Ali Ahmad, Chief Commissioner Islamabad, Zohaib Ranjha; former SP Investigation (Lahore), Muhammad Ali; former DC Faisalabad, SSP Sarfraz Virk; former DPO Jhang; and SP Bilal Zafar, former DPO Chiniot. Raja is the son-in-law of Saeed Mehdi; a former top bureaucrat who served as Principal Secretary to PM Nawaz Sharif.

Raja's wife, Rabab Sikandar, is a serving Customs official who was promoted to the post of Chief Collector Customs in grade 22 in 2022.

== Career and education ==
Raja was born in a village near Bhera in district Sargodha, Punjab, Pakistan. He got his earlier education from Government School, Bhera after which he joined Cadet College Hasan Abdal where he completed FSc. Post high-school, he got admission to Nishtar Medical College, Multan, where he studied for four years. In the final year of MBBS, he migrated to King Edward Medical College and graduated with a bachelor's degree in medicine. He also did LLB from Punjab University Law College. He was then inducted into the Pakistan Administrative Service; his first post was Assistant Commissioner Islamabad in 1989.

Raja has served as Deputy Commissioner Islamabad and Punjab's provincial Secretary of Communications & Works (C&W), Services and General Administration (S&GAD), and Local Government before briefly serving as ACS (G) in Punjab. He has also served as Chief Secretary for the provinces of Gilgit Baltistan as well as Azad Jammu Kashmir. He remained as Director General Immigration and Passport under the administration of Prime Minister Nawaz Sharif.

Raja was promoted to the rank of Federal Secretary in 2017. He was Secretary Petroleum from April 2017 till August 2018. In November 2018, Prime Minister Imran Khan appointed Raja as the Railways Secretary of Pakistan and Chairman Pakistan Railways. He served as Railways Secretary and Chairman Pakistan Railways until December 2019.

In January 2020, Imran Khan appointed him to the post of Chief Election Commissioner of Pakistan (CEC) on the recommendation of Sheikh Rasheed, and then army chief, Qamar Bajwa. He is the first career bureaucrat to be appointed to the role of CEC, after a relevant amendment was made in Election Act (2017). Conventionally, this post has been held by judges of the country's superior judiciary since the passage of the 1973 constitution.

== Allegations and controversies ==
=== Impartiality ===
Sikandar Sultan Raja is alleged to have shown lack of impartiality in the election process. The Punjab Assembly on 31 July 2022 passed a resolution against him and demanded his resignation as the chief of the Election Commission of Pakistan (ECP).

=== Appointment of bureaucrats as electoral officers ===
For the first time in Pakistan's electoral history since 1985, Sikandar Sultan employed the services of the highly politicized executive bureaucracy, particularly Assistant Commissioners and Deputy Commissioners, in the key electoral roles of Returning Officers (RO) and District Returning Officers (DRO). These ROs and DROs are engaged in all stages of the electoral process: from screening applicants to consolidation of vote counts, and, finally, provisionally notifying winning candidates. Traditionally, these posts have been occupied by the lower judiciary of the country.

On 14 December 2023, Justice Ali Baqar Najafi of the Lahore High Court suspended the Election Commission's decision on the petition of Pakistan Tehreek-e-Insaf (PTI) that questioned the apparent bias of the appointed bureaucrats. However, the next day, a three-member bench of the Supreme Court of Pakistan, consisting of Qazi Faez Isa, Mansoor Ali Shah, and Sardar Tariq Masood, set aside this ruling and allowed the DROs and ROs to be notified from the bureaucracy, meanwhile stopping LHC from undertaking further proceedings on the petition citing over-reach of authority.

On 30 December 2023, these ROs rejected a majority of the nomination papers filed by the leadership of PTI, including those of the party's chief, Imran Khan. PTI's general secretary, Omar Ayub, termed the rejections as "pre-poll rigging". The party challenged these rejections in the courts. Many of these rejections were then reversed by the courts.

When the 2024 general elections were conducted on 8 February 2024, some of these ROs were alleged to have tampered with provisional consolidated counts (Form 47) to make PTI candidate lose seats. PTI leaders filed several appeals in courts regarding these results.

=== Reserved seats controversy ===
In the aftermath of the 2024 elections, Raja, along with 3 of the other 4 members of the election commission, decided against giving PTI-backed independents reserved seats in proportion to the general seats won. Instead, the commission, distributed those seats among the ruling coalition, effectively giving them a super majority. PTI challenged the decision in Peshawar High Court, terming it against the constitution of Pakistan, however the court sided with the commission. Subsequently, the matter was challenged before the Supreme Court with a full-court hearing the constitutional matter. On 12 July 2024, the court returned with a 8-5 verdict, that declared the commission's decision "null and void" and "against the constitution of Pakistan". Subsequently, PTI demanded immediate resignation from Raja.
