= Jawad Rafique Malik =

Pakistani civil servant

Jawad Rafique Malik جواد رفیق ملک

Industries Secretary of Pakistan
- In office 7 September 2021 – 20 December 2022
- Appointed by: Imran Khan

Chief Secretary Punjab
- In office 24 April 2020 – 7 September 2021
- Appointed by: Imran Khan
- Succeeded by: Kamran Ali Afzal

Communications Secretary of Pakistan
- In office July 2019 – April 2020
- Appointed by: Imran Khan

Chairman National Highway Authority
- In office December 2017 – July 2019
- Appointed by: Shahid Khaqan Abbasi

Federal Secretary National Assembly
- In office April 2017 – December 2017
- Appointed by: Nawaz Sharif

Personal details
- Born: 28 April 1962 (age 64) Lahore, Pakistan
- Occupation: Civil servant

Jawad Rafique Malik (Urdu: جواد رفیق ملک) is a retired officer of the Pakistani civil service, who served in Grade 22 as Chief Secretary Punjab and Federal Secretary of the Kashmir Affairs and Gilgit-Baltistan Division. Hailing from Lahore, Malik belongs to the Pakistan Administrative Service (PAS) and is batchmates with Fawad Hasan Fawad, Rizwan Ahmed, Sikandar Sultan Raja and Shoaib Mir Memon.

== Career ==
Jawad Rafique Malik served as the Pakistan Secretary of Industries and Production; from September 2021 to December 2022. Prior to this, he tenured as Chief Secretary of Punjab from April 2020 to 7 September 2021.

He served as Communications Secretary of Pakistan, from July 2019 to April 2020. He had previously served as Chairman of the National Highway Authority.

Malik was promoted to the rank of Federal Secretary in 2017, and served as Federal Secretary of the National Assembly of Pakistan from April 2017 to December 2017. Malik belongs to the Pakistan Administrative Service and is batchmates with Sikandar Sultan Raja, Fawad Hasan Fawad, Rizwan Ahmed, Allah Dino Khawaja and Zafarullah Khan.

Before serving in the federal government, Malik served in the Government of Punjab as the provincial Health Secretary and Commissioner Lahore.

== See also ==
- Government of Pakistan
- Pakistan Administrative Service
- National Highway Authority
