= Pakistan Administrative Service =

Pakistan's governmental administrative department

The Pakistan Administrative Service, or PAS (Urdu: انتظامی خدمتِ پاکستان) (previously known as the District Management Group or DMG before 1 June 2012) is an elite cadre of the Civil Services of Pakistan. The Pakistan Administrative Service over the years has emerged as the most consolidated and developed post-colonial institution in Pakistan, with the PAS officers of Grade 22 often seen as stronger than the federal government ministers. The service of PAS is generalist in nature and officers are assigned to different departments all across Pakistan during the course of their careers. Almost all of the country's highest-profile positions such as the Federal Secretaries, the provincial Chief Secretaries, and chairmen of top-heavy organizations like the National Highway Authority, Trading Corporation of Pakistan and State Life Insurance Corporation usually belong to the Pakistan Administrative Service.

Officers in this occupational group are recruited through a national competitive examination held once a year by the Federal Public Service Commission. Those selected for this group have to undergo a two-year training programme at the Civil Services Academy (CSA) in Lahore.

== History ==
The Indian Civil Service (ICS)—also known once as Imperial Civil Service in British India, predecessor of the Civil Service of Pakistan and District Management Group—was established by the British to colonize India and perpetuate the British Raj. After Indian independence in 1947, the Indian Civil Service component ceded to Pakistan was renamed the Civil Service of Pakistan. In 1954, an agreement was reached between the Governor General of Pakistan and the governors of the provinces to constitute an All-Pakistan service valid throughout Pakistan.

Later under the administrative reforms of 1973, the name of Civil Service of Pakistan was changed to District Management Group, which became one of thirteen occupational groups under the All-Pakistan Unified Groups (APUG). Since 1973, each year a new batch of officers undergo a "Common Training Programme" (CTP) which includes officers of thirteen occupational groups at the Civil Services Academy.

== Appointments of PAS Officers ==
After completing initial training and probation at the Civil Services Academy, officers are posted in field offices throughout Pakistan on Basic Pay Scale (BPS)-17 grade appointments. Officers of the rank of Captains (within 3 to 6 years' service) and equivalents from defense services are also inducted (in three occupational groups; P.A.S, Police and Foreign Services) on allocated quota after recommendations of Chairman Federal Public Service Commission. This quota was introduced by President General Zia ul Haq through an infamous amendment to the law primarily to have domination of military over civil bureaucracy and is still in vogue.

Officers of PAS are first appointed typically as Assistant Commissioners of sub-divisions. They will simultaneously be charged with the responsibilities of Assistant Commissioners of Sub-Divisional level.

The Basic Pay Scales (BPS grades) are enumerated (in order of increasing responsibility) such as:

Grade	Appointment	Remarks
BPS-17	Under Secretary to Provincial Government; Section Officer in Federal Secretariat; Assistant Commissioner (AC); Assistant Political Agent (APA); Assistant Director of Federal / Provincial Department	Field appointment of AC combines roles of Sub-Divisional Magistrate (SDM) and Assistant Collector (Land Revenue)
BPS-18	Deputy Secretary to Provincial Government; Senior Section Officer in Federal Secretariat; Deputy Commissioner (DC) for a smaller district; Political Agent (PA) for a smaller agency; Additional Deputy Commissioner (ADC) for a larger district; Additional Political Agent for a larger agency; Deputy Director of a Federal / Provincial Department	Field appointment of DC combines roles of District Magistrate (DM) and Collector (Land Revenue)
BPS-19	Deputy Secretary to the Government of Pakistan; Additional Secretary to Provincial Government; [[Additional Commissioner]] of a Larger Administrative Division (Appointment created on required basis).; Deputy Commissioner (DC) for a larger district; Political Agent (PA) for a larger agency; Project Manager for Federal Scheme; Director of a Federal / Provincial Department	
BPS-20	Joint Secretary to the Government of Pakistan; Secretary to Provincial Government; Member Provincial Board of Revenue; Commissioners of Administrative Divisions; Director-General of Federal Department; Project Director for Federal Scheme	Divisional Commissioners were previously under Members of Board of Revenue but are now directly responsible to respective Chief Secretaries.
BPS-21	Acting Secretary to the Government of Pakistan; Additional Secretary to the Government of Pakistan; Additional Chief Secretary to Provincial Government (e.g. ACS Services); Chairman Provincial Planning and Development Board; Senior Member Provincial Board of Revenue; Commissioners of Larger Administrative Divisions; Chairman of Federal Organisations; Chief Executive / Managing Director of Public Corporation; Chief Secretary to AJK / Gilgit-Baltistan Government.	During 2001 to 2008, Commissioners of Administrative and Larger Administrative Divisions were abolished. Office of District Coordination Officers (DCO) established; BPS-21 in newly formed city district governments and BPS-20 in district governments, replacing office of deputy commissioners.
BPS-22	Federal Secretary; Chief Secretary to Provincial Government; Director General of Autonomous Federal Department/Agency; Chairman of Autonomous Federal Organisation; Managing Director / Chief Executive of Autonomous Public Corporation	Highest attainable and most prestigious designation.

== Post-devolution (2001) scenario ==
Post devolution, local government ordinance PLGO 2001. The Divisional Governments/Administrative Divisions were abolished by the then President Pervaiz Musharraf in 2001 and hence the office of Divisional Commissioner was abolished. The Office of Deputy Commissioner was upgraded/up scaled and designated as District Coordination Officer DCO and was deprived of the powers of District Magistrate. However, in 2008, after the presidency of General Musharraf, provincial governments of Pakistan again established the office of Divisional Commissioner. In 2011 and 2017, the term DCO was also re named as Deputy Commissioner in Sindh and Punjab provinces respectively and District Magistracy continues to be exercised in the federal capital; however, the institution of the office of the Deputy Commissioner has been deprived of its previously held judicial powers elsewhere in the country.

== Notable PAS officers ==
- Ghulam Ishaq Khan
- Chaudhry Muhammad Ali
- Farooq Leghari
- Qudrat Ullah Shahab
- Shehzad Arbab
- Raja Muhammad Abbas
- Kamran Rasool
- Nargis Sethi
- Shahjehan Syed Karim
- Nasir Mahmood Khosa
- Tasneem Noorani
- Syed Darbar Ali Shah
- Shahid Aziz Siddiqi
- Maroof Afzal
- Rizwan Ahmed
- Naveed Kamran Baloch
- Sardar Ahmad Nawaz Sukhera
- Azam Suleman Khan
- Kamran Lashari
- Mir Ahmed Bakhsh Lehri
- Shoaib Mir Memon
- Mumtaz Ali Shah
- Allah Bakhsh Malik
- Iqbal Hussain Durrani
- Babar Yaqoob Fateh Muhammad
- Syed Abu Ahmad Akif
- Jawad Rafique Malik
- Tariq Bajwa
- Fawad Hasan Fawad
- Muhammad Sualeh Ahmad Faruqi
- Sikandar Sultan Raja
- Fazal Abbas Maken
- Agha Jan Akhtar
- Masood Khaddarposh
- Aftab Ghulam Nabi Kazi
- Roedad Khan
- Ishrat Hussain
- Masood Mufti
- Mustafa Zaidi
- Aminullah chaudhry
- Usman Ali Isani
- Rabiya Javeri Agha
- Naseer Ahmad

== See also ==
- Federal Secretary
- Grade 22
- Chief Secretary (Pakistan)
- Deputy Commissioner
- List of serving Generals of the Pakistan Army
- Law enforcement in Pakistan
