= Grade 22 =

Senior most civil servants of Islamic Republic of Pakistan

Grade-22 (also referred to as BPS-22) (Urdu: بی پی ایس-۲۲) is the highest attainable rank for a Civil Servant in Pakistan. Grade 22 is equal to a 4-star rank of the Pakistan Armed Forces. With over five hundred thousand civil servants and bureaucrats in Pakistan, only a few dozen officers serve in BPS-22 grade at a given time. Hence, not even 1% of the country's civil servants or bureaucrats make it to the highest rank. Officers serving in BPS-22 grade are largely considered to be the most influential individuals in the country.

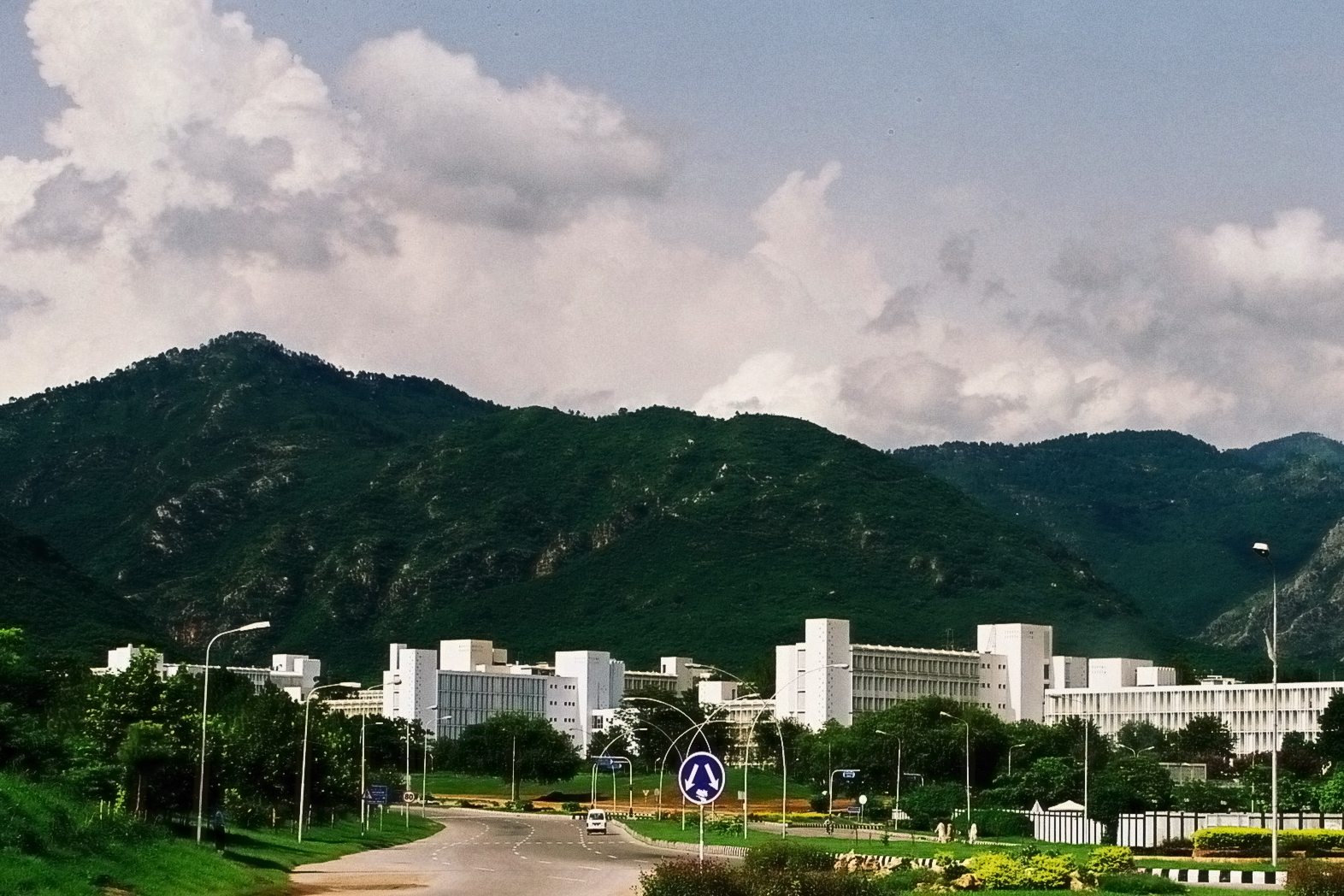
Pakistan Secretariat Buildings, Islamabad

Each officer who reaches Grade-22 has, on average, a civil service career spanning over 30 years to 32 years. Elevation to Grade-22 is decided by the High Powered Selection Board (HPSB), which is chaired by the Prime Minister or President of Pakistan. Other ex-officio members of the Board, who advise the PM on promotions, are the Establishment Secretary of Pakistan, the Cabinet Secretary of Pakistan and the Principal Secretary to the Prime Minister of Pakistan.

The following key positions in the country are occupied by Grade-22 Officials:

- Secretary to the Government of Pakistan
- Chief Secretary to a Provincial Government
- Director General/ Chairman of a large state-owned corporation or agency such as the Federal Board of Revenue, Federal Investigation Agency, Intelligence Bureau, etc.
- Inspector General of Police
- Special Secretary to the Government of Pakistan

== Prominent Grade 22 officers (serving and retired) ==
- Roedad Khan
- Nasir Mahmood Khosa
- Tariq Bajwa
- Malik Abdul Samad
- Rizwan Ahmed
- Babar Yaqoob Fateh Muhammad
- Malik Mohammed Habib Khan
- Maroof Afzal
- Azam Suleman Khan
- Shoaib Mir Memon
- Mir Ahmed Bakhsh Lehri
- Sardar Ahmad Nawaz Sukhera
- Muhammad Sualeh Ahmad Faruqi
- Moinuddin Haider
- Sajjad Saleem Hotiana
- Raja Muhammad Abbas
- Arshad Sami Khan
- Allah Bakhsh Malik
- Kamran Rasool
- Jawad Rafique Malik
- Syed Abu Ahmad Akif
- Sikandar Sultan Raja
- Tasneem Noorani
- Shahjehan Syed Karim
- Iqbal Hussain Durrani
- Hussain Asghar
- Allah Dino Khawaja
- Fawad Hasan Fawad
- Kamran Lashari
- Qudrat Ullah Shahab
- Mumtaz Ali Shah
- Ghulam Ishaq Khan
- Jalil Abbas Jilani
- Rabiya Javeri Agha
- Syed Hassan Raza
- Aftab Ghulam Nabi Kazi
- Sohail Mahmood
- Abdul Basit
- Riaz Mohammad Khan
- Javid Husain
- Inam-ul-Haq
- Shamshad Ahmad
- Riaz Khokhar
- Masood Khan
- Najmuddin Shaikh
- Tanvir Ahmad Khan
- Humayun Khan
- Niaz Naik
- Abdul Sattar
- Agha Shahi
- Jalaludin Abdur Rahim
- Nasir Durrani
- Nargis Sethi
- Tehmina Janjua
- Fazal-ur-Rehman
- Salman Bashir
