= Cabinet Secretary (Pakistan) =

Post in federal government of Pakistan

Cabinet Secretary of Pakistan
- معتمدِ کابینہ پاکستان
- Incumbent; Kamran Ali Afzal
- Reports to: Prime Minister of Pakistan
- Seat: Islamabad
- Appointer: Prime Minister of Pakistan
- Website: Cabinet Division

The Cabinet Secretary of Pakistan (Urdu: معتمدِ کابینہ پاکستان) is the Federal Secretary to the Cabinet of Pakistan. The Cabinet secretary serves as the administrative head of the Cabinet Division, providing policy advice to the prime minister and Cabinet. Usually the senior-most BPS-22 grade officer of the Pakistan Administrative Service is appointed to this post.

Officeholders being the senior-most civil servants of the country head the secretaries' committee and have direct say in the transfers, postings and promotions of unmatched civil servants in BPS 20, BPS 21 and BPS 22. During meetings of the federal cabinet, the Cabinet secretary sits on the right-hand side of the Prime Minister.

== See also ==
- Government of Pakistan
- Establishment Secretary of Pakistan
- Interior Secretary of Pakistan
- Finance Secretary of Pakistan
- Federal Secretary National Security Division
