= District coordination officer =

Government official in Pakistan

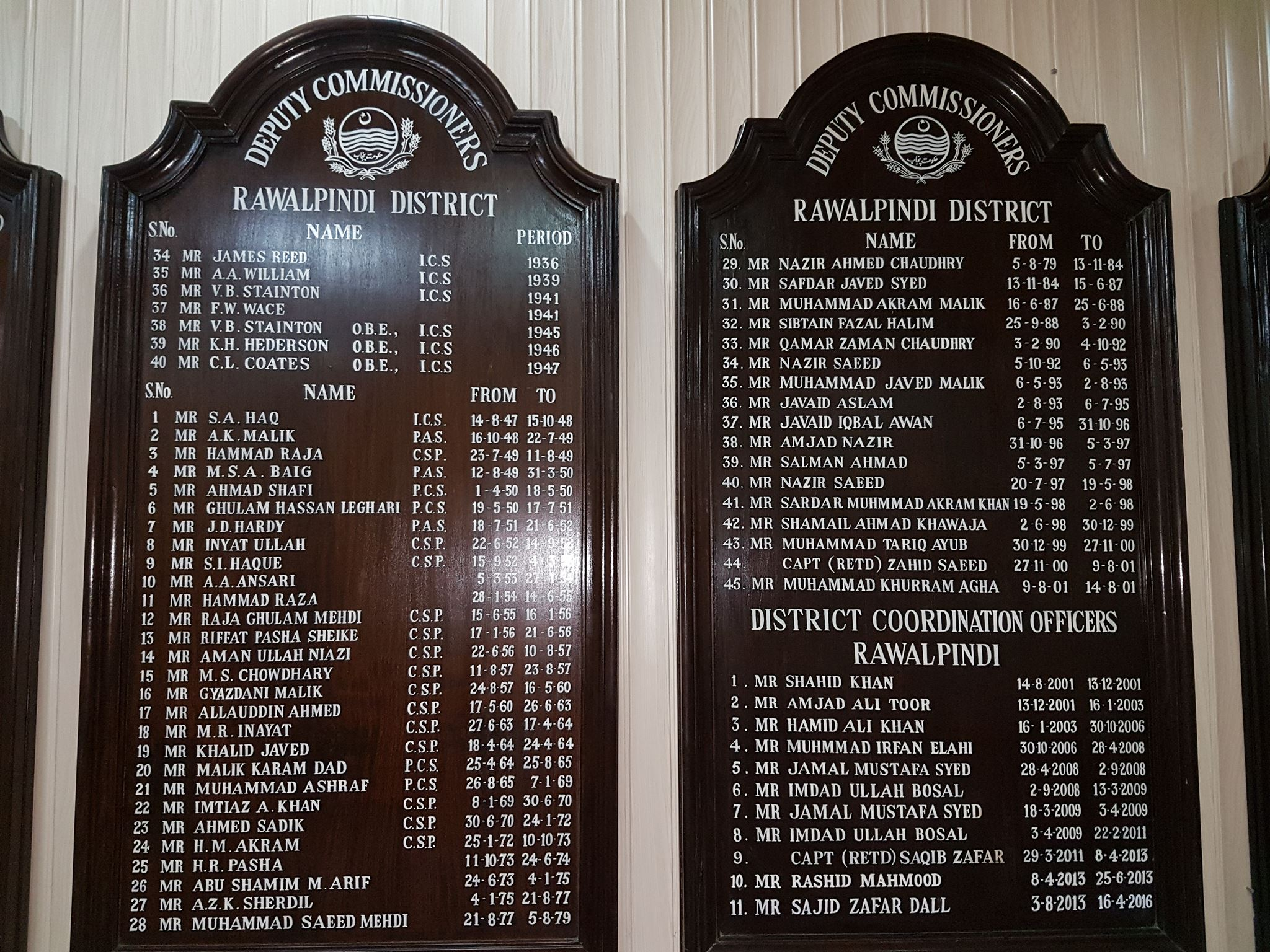
District coordination officers of city district government Rawalpindi (post-devolution)

The District Coordination Officer (DCO) was the administrative head of the newly formed district and city-district governments on the 14th of August, 2001 in Pakistan. It was a senior officer (grade BS20/21) belonging from the provincial (of the executive PCS) or federal government service cadre. The role was often denoted as a ''commissioner" in bureaucracy due to its equivalent grade. Officeholders of the officer supervised the affairs of all the public offices and public facilities in the district/city-district for purposes of integrated development, efficient use of public resources, and effective service delivery. The officer ensures that the standards set by the government in respect of a public facility are fully observed and supervises and coordinates the implementation of the policies, instructions and guidelines of the government.

== Local government reforms (2001) and establishment of the office of district coordination officer ==
Post devolution, local government ordinance PLGO 2001. The divisional governments were abolished by President Pervez Musharraf in 2001 and hence the post of divisional commissioner (grade BS20/BS21) were brought to an end. In divisions of all provinces of Pakistan the posts of commissioners were abolished till 2008. The deputy commissioners of the districts were designated as DCOs, i.e. district coordination officers, and the post of DCO was upgraded to grade BS21 in the city district governments and to grade BS20 in all other districts from 14th Aug 2001.

=== Formation of city district governments, district governments ===
Much of the powers and functions of provincial and divisional governments were shifted and devolved to the newly formed district and city district governments. Out of total 36 districts of Punjab Province, only five metropolis were given the status of city districts. Initially, the existing Commissioners were posted as DCO in the city districts. In Sindh province, five districts of Karachi division were abolished and a single city district government Karachi was formed. Divisional Commissioner Karachi was appointed as first DCO Karachi. Each district was empowered to make own policies and developmental budgets via newly formed District Assemblies.

District governments were formed in total 150 districts of Pakistan, out of which only eight were city district governments (CDG);

City districts of Pakistan
Punjab	Sindh Province	Baluchistan	KPK Province
Lahore (CDGL)	Karachi (CDGK)	Quetta (CDGQ)	Peshawar (CDGP)
Faisalabad (CDGF),	Karachi (CDGK)	Quetta (CDGQ)	Peshawar (CDGP)
Rawalpindi (CDGR)	Karachi (CDGK)	Quetta (CDGQ)	Peshawar (CDGP)
Multan (CDGM)	Karachi (CDGK)	Quetta (CDGQ)	Peshawar (CDGP)
Gujranwala (CDGG)	Karachi (CDGK)	Quetta (CDGQ)	Peshawar (CDGP)

=== Functions and powers ===
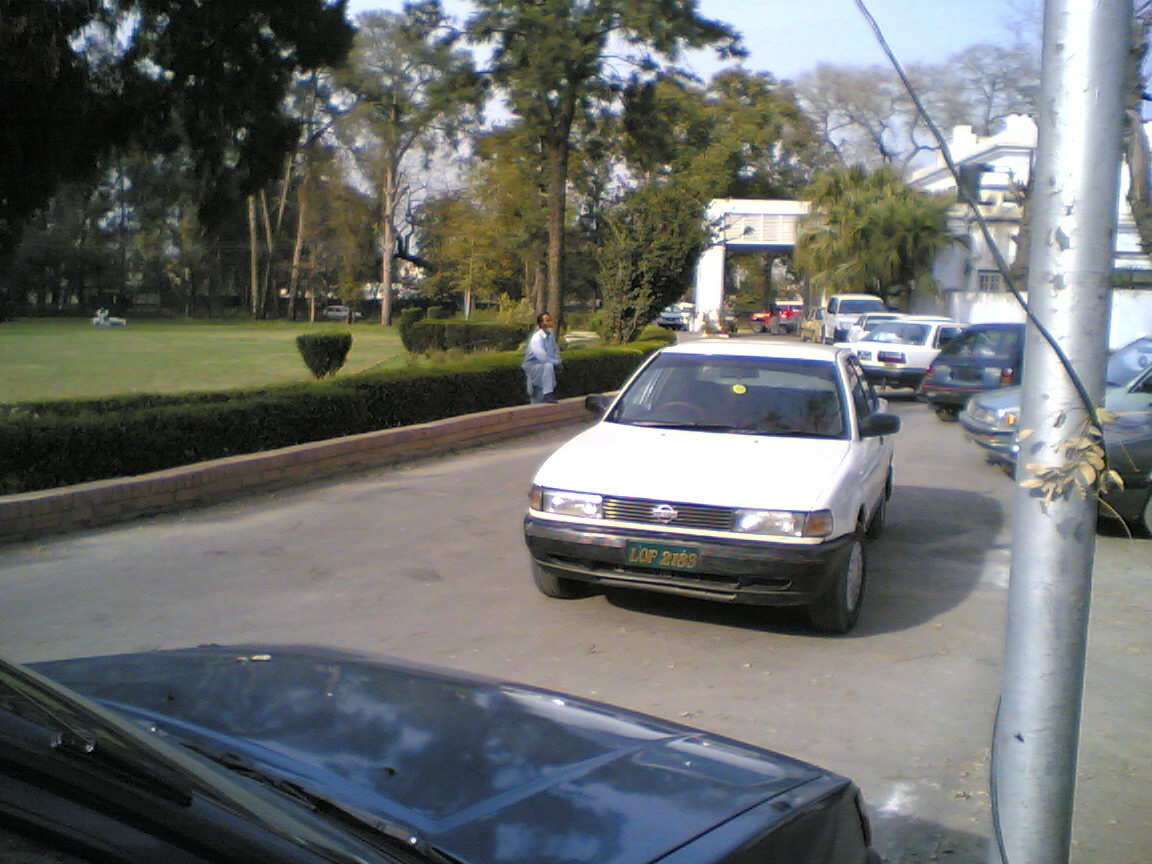
29 Aug 2004: city district government Rawalpindi officials gathered at camp office of district nazim/mayor. Before Aug 2001 it was Commissioner House Rawalpindi and later in 2006 converted to Rawalpindi Gym Khana Club.

DCO was the head of district governments. DCOs had similar administrative powers and duties which deputy commissioner and commissioners used to have. DCO was the principal accounting officer of the district and answerable to the provincial assembly public accounts committee. However, the land revenue appellate powers of the commissioner were decentralized/devolved from division to district and were handed over to the newly created post of executive district officer (revenue) and district land collector power of deputy commissioners were handed over to the new post of district officer (revenue). Subsequently, the power of assistant commissioner/assistant collector was handed over to the deputy district officer (revenue). The EDO(revenue) grade BS19, DO(revenue) BS18 and DDO(revenue) BS17 were the same officers of provincial or federal civil services i.e. PMS/PCS or CSP/DMG/PAS.

Notification no. FD(FR)II-5/82
Existing designation	New designation in district government	Remarks
Commissioner	Executive district officer (revenue), EDOR	As per notification of government of Punjab, finance department dated 13th-Sept-2001 The existing limits of financial/revenue powers as given in the delegation of financial powers rule, 1990- special Powers to revenue department will be exercised by EDOR, DOR and DDOR.
Deputy commissioner/collector	District officer (revenue), DOR	As per notification of government of Punjab, finance department dated 13th-Sept-2001 The existing limits of financial/revenue powers as given in the delegation of financial powers rule, 1990- special Powers to revenue department will be exercised by EDOR, DOR and DDOR.
Assistant commissioner (AC)	Deputy district officer (revenue), DDOR	As per notification of government of Punjab, finance department dated 13th-Sept-2001 The existing limits of financial/revenue powers as given in the delegation of financial powers rule, 1990- special Powers to revenue department will be exercised by EDOR, DOR and DDOR.

In absence of DCO, EDO (revenue) used to hold acting charge of DCO. DCO was the in charge of all departments/group of offices of the district including revenue, finance and planning, health, education, literacy, information technology, agriculture & livestock, works & services, forests, community development, municipal services etc. All these departments/group of offices were headed by respective EDOs who than reported to the DCO. DCOs and Revenue officials were entrusted with the magisterial powers also from time to time. DCO was directly reporting to the Chief Secretary of the province for administrative matters and chief minister. whereas in their district the policy making was done in consultation with the district nazim/Mmayor, who was an elected representative and the chief executive of the district.

=== Restoration of the divisional governments and office of divisional commissioners ===
In 2008, after the presidency of Pervez Musharraf, provincial governments of Pakistan again established the third tier of government i.e. divisional governments through constitutional amendments and the post of divisional commissioner (BS20/BS21) was again initiated. Divisional commissioners report directly to the Chief Secretary of the province.

=== Restoration of the office of Deputy Commissioner ===
Soon after appointment of Divisional Commissioners, junior officers were posted as DCO and they started working under supervision of Divisional commissioners, later on the post was officially downgraded to BS19 as before 2001. Though the District Nazim/Mayors initially resisted this change but to no avail and the local governments were made dysfunctional. In 2011 and 2017, the term DCO was also re named as Deputy Commissioner in Sindh and Punjab province respectively

The appellate powers of land revenue are now again with the Divisional Commissioner and the post of EDO(revenue) is abolished. The post of deputy commissioner has now the powers of land collector as before thus post of District Officer (Revenue) is also abolished. Deputy District officer (Revenue) is now the assistant commissioner.

== Responsibilities ==
District are now under control of deputy commissioners, who are responsible for law and order, collection of revenue, developmental program coordination and common welfare of people in their respective districts.

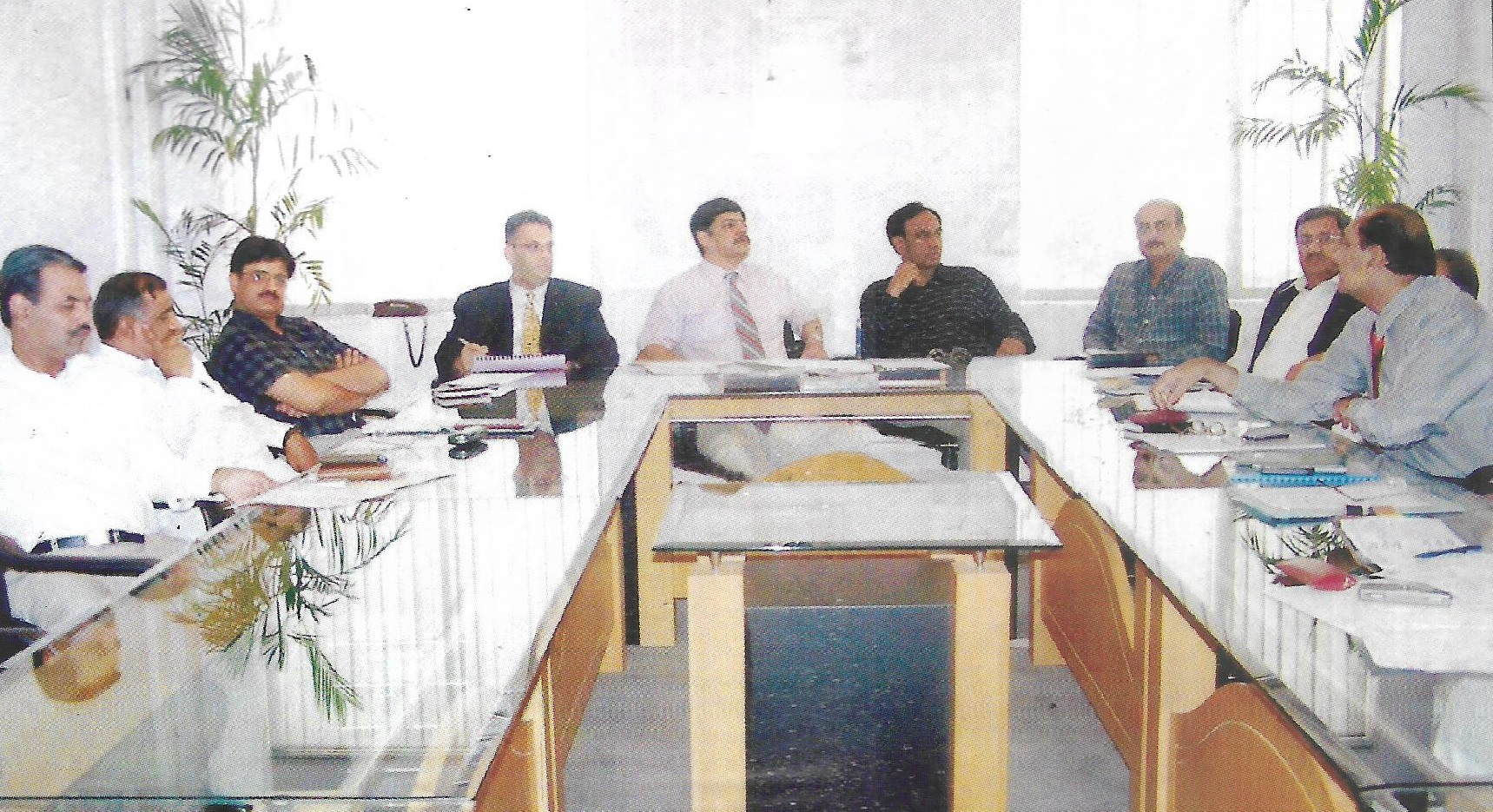
DCO Faisalabad Maj (R) Azam Suleman (middle) along with District Mayor Faisalabad, chairing district development meeting

== List of district coordination officers ==
Following are the names of district coordination officers who served in post devolution era during 2001 to 2008 in Pakistan :

=== Punjab Province ===
District	Name of DCO
Attock(Campbellpur)	Bashir Ahmad Farooqi (2006–2008) Babar Khan Nasir PCS (2004–2006) Syed M. Javed DMG (2002–2003) Asif Ali Khan (14Aug2001-2002)
Bahawalnagar	Tariq Feroz DMG (2006–2008) Muzaffar Mahmood (2006-2006) Ch. Talib Hussain (2005–2006) Muhammad Abid Javed (2004–2005) Muhammad Azhar (14Aug2001-2004)
Bahawalpur	Muhammad Ashraf
Bhakkar	Bashir Ahmad Chaudhry (2004-Apr2008) Abdul Basit Suhail (2003–2004) Khalid Hanif (14Aug2001-2003)
Chakwal	Babar Khan Nasir PCS (2006–2008) Muhammad Azam Saleem DMG(2004–2006) Sajjad Saleem Hotiana DMG (2003–2004) Zubair Masood PCS (2001–2003)
Chiniot	District founded in February 2009
Dera Ghazi Khan	Iram Bukhari DMG (2006–2007) Pervez Khusro Malik (2004–2006) Shafqat-Ur-Rehman Ranjha (2004-2004) Nayyer Mahmood (2003–2004) Saqib Aleem (14Aug2001-2003)
Faisalabad(Lyallpur) City District	Maj (Retd.) Azam Suleman (2006–2008). Athar Hussain Khan Sial DMG (2004–2006) Tahir Hussain (2001–2004) Maj (R) Iqbal Ahmed (14Aug2001-Dec2001)
GujranwalaCity District	Akhtar Hussain Khan Sial Rao Manzir Hayat Khalid Masood Ch Capt. (R) Fazeel Asghar DMG Iftikhar Ahmad DMG Muhammad Javaid Malik, DMG
Gujrat	Abdul Ghafoor Bhatti(2007–2008) Chaudhry Saadat Ali PCS (2003–2007) Capt(rtd) Agha Nadeem DMG (14Aug2001-2003).
Hafizabad	Rana Saleem Ahmad
Jhang	Zubair Khurshid Bhatti (Nov2007-Aug2008) Maj (Rtd) Rizwan Ullah Baig (Apr2007-Nov2007) Rao Fahim Hashim (Jan2006-Apr2007) Muhammad Arif Khan (Feb2003-Jan2006) Hassan Nawaz Tarar (14Aug2001-Feb2002)
Jhelum	Mirza Mahmood ul Hassan
Kasur	Saeed Akhtar Ansari (2006–2008) Muhammad Hashim Tareen (2003–2006) Zubair Masood (2003–2004) Babr Yaqoob Fateh (14Aug2001-2003)
Khanewal	Rao Shakeel Ahmad (Jun2007-Apr2008) Kausar-A-Ghaffar (Jun2002-May2004) Muhammad Khan Khichi (May2004-Jun2007) Mahmood Akhtar (Aug2001-Jun2002)
Khushab	Dr. Muhammad Saleh Tahir (Aug2007-Apr2008) Muhammad Asif
Lahore(Provincial Capital)	Mian Muhammad Ijaz (2005 - 2008) Capt. (R) Khalid Sultan (2002 - 2005) Shahid Najam (14 Aug 2001 - 2002)
Layyah	Mehmood Akhter (2006–2007) Syed Muhammad Mohsin Sherazi (2006–2007) Nazir Ahmed Choudhary (2004–2006) Ch. Ghulam Sarwer (2004–2005) Muhammad Anis Qureshi PCS (2004-2004) Pervez Khusro Malik (14Aug2001-2004)
Lodhran	Waqar Ahmad Khan (Oct2007–Apr2008) M.Hameedullah Sheikh (Sep2004-Oct2007) Malik Muhammad Afzal Awan (Nov2003-Sep2004) Ch. Akbar Ali Bhullar (Aug2001-Oct2003)
Mandi Bahauddin	Waheed Akhtar Ansari. Muhammad Anis Qureshi PCS
Mianwali	Babar Shafi (2007–2008) Saqib Aleem (2006–2007) Zulfiqar Ali Toor (2005–2006) Rana Naseer Ahmad DMG (2003–2005) Salim Sher Afghan Kiani PCS (2001–2003) Khusro Pervez Khan DMG (14Aug2001-Oct2001)
MultanCity District	A. Sattar Sheikh (Jul2007-Apr2008) Syed Iftikhar Hussain Babar (Feb2005-Jun2007) Muhammad Ejaz Ch. (Aug2003-Feb2005) Maj.(R) Azam Suleman Khan (Oct2001-Aug2003) Naguib Ullah Malik DMG (Aug2001-Oct2001)
Muzaffargarh	Akhter Nazir Waraich(2007–2008) Tariq Najeeb Najmi (2006–2007) Ch. Muhammad Azhar(2004–2006) Shamsher Ali Khan Sial (2003–2004) Muhammad Azam Saleem (2002–2003) Sajjad Saleem Hotiana DMG (14Aug2001-2002)
Narowal	Rao Manzar Hayat (2005–2008) Muhammad Asif (2003–2005) Sheikh Muhammad Ilyas (2002–2003) Shoukat Iqbal (14Aug2001-2002)
Nankana Sahib	Capt. (Retd) Fazeel Asghar (2005–2008)
Okara	Mohammad Aslam Kamboh (DMG) (2005–2008) Syed Iftikhar Hussain Babar (DMG) (2003–2005) Dr. Mansoor Ahmad Bajwa (PCS) (2003) Khalid Masood Choudhry DMG (Aug2001-2003)
Pakpattan	Babar Shafi
Rahim Yar Khan	Syed Iftikhar Hussain Shah (2007–2008) Muhammad Mushtaq Ahmad(2007) Hamid Nawaz Sheikh(2005–2007) Javaid Akhtar Khan (2003–2005) Capt. Atta Muhammad (2001–2003) M. Naseem Ghani(14Aug 2001 - died)
Rajanpur	Samiullah Abid
RawalpindiCity District	Sqn. Ldr (Rtd) Irfan Elahi (2006–2008). Lt Cdr (R) Hamid Ali Khan (2003–2006). Sqn. Ldr (Rtd) Amjad Ali Toor (2001–2003) Shahid Khan DMG (14Aug2001-14Dec2001)
Sahiwal(Montgomery)	Inaam ul Haq PCS Hameed Amjad Warraich PCS
Sargodha	Hameed Amjad Warraich PCS (Nov2006-Apr2008) Dr Sajid Yousafani DMG (Nov2005-Oct2006) Obaid Rabani Qureshi (Aug2004-Nov2005) Hassan Iqbal (2001-Aug2004) Javed Aslam (14Aug2001-Sep2001)
Sheikhupura	Muzaffar Mehmood (2006–2007) Javad Iqbal Chaudhry (2005–2006) Zafar Iqbal Sheikh(2004–2005) Tariq Najeeb Najmi (Mar2004-Dec2004) Muhammad Ayub Qazi(2003-Mar2004) Khusro Pervez Khan(Oct2001-2003) Sardar Ahamd Nawaz Sukhera (14Aug2001-Oct2001)
Sialkot	Capt. (R) Atta Muhammad Khan(2007–2009) Maj (R) Rizwan Ullah Beg (2006–2007) Shafqat-Ur-Rehman Ranjha (2005–2006) Tahir Raza (2004–2005) Capt. (R) Zahid Saeed (14Aug2001-2004)
Toba Tek Singh	Nawazish Ali (Dec2005-Apr2008) Faqir Syed Anwar-ud-Din (Feb2005-Nov2005) Karim Bakhsh Abid (Feb2003-Feb2005) Saleem Aktar Kayani (Sep2001-May2003) Seerat Asgar Jaura DMG (14Aug2001-Sep2001)
Vehari	M. Hameed Ullah Shaikh (Oct2007-Apr2008) Babar Hassan Bharwana (Sep2006-Oct2007) Muhammad Ayub Qazi (Apr2004-Jul2006) Muhammad Imtiaz Tajwar (Jul2002-Apr2004) Nadeem Hassan Asif (14Aug2001-Jul2002)

=== Baluchistan Province ===
District	Name of DCO
Gwadar	Allamuddin Bullo DMG (2001–2002)
Jafarabad	Allamuddin Bullo DMG (2002–2005)
