= Constituency PK-69 (Peshawar-IV) =

- Constituency for the Khyber Pakhtunkhwa Assembly

Current constituency
- Member: Muhammad Ishtiaq

Constituency PK-69 (Peshawar-IV) is a constituency for the Khyber Pakhtunkhwa Assembly of the Khyber Pakhtunkhwa province of Pakistan.

== Members of Parliament ==
=== Since 2018: PK-69 (Peshawar-IV) ===
Election	Member	Party
2018	Muhammad Ishtiaq	PTI

=== 2013–2018: PK-04 (Peshawar-IV) ===
Election	Member	Party
2013	Arif Yousaf	PTI

=== 2002–2013: PF-04 (Peshawar-IV) ===
Election	Member	Party
2008	Syed Aqil Shah	ANP
2002	Ibrahim Khan Qasmi	Independent

== Elections 2013 ==
Contesting candidates	Party affiliation	Votes polled
Arif Yousaf	Pakistan Tehreek-E-Insaf	20741
Ibrahim Khan Qasmi	Mutahida Deeni Mahaz	10540
Syed Aqil Shah	Awami National Party	5868
Muhammad Arshad Qureshi	Pakistan Muslim League (N)	3340
Kifayatullah Khan	Pakistan Peoples Party Parliamentarians	3112
Arbab Muhammad Farooq Jan	Jamiat Ulama-E-Islam (F)	2623
Riaz Ahmed Bacha	Jamaat-E-Islami Pakistan	1054

== See also ==
- Government of Khyber Pakhtunkhwa
- Khyber Pakhtunkhwa Assembly
- Constituency PK-01 (Peshawar-I)
- Constituency PK-02 (Peshawar-II)
- Constituency PK-03 (Peshawar-III)
- Constituency PK-05 (Peshawar-V)
- Constituency PK-06 (Peshawar-VI)
- Constituency PK-07 (Peshawar-VII)
- Constituency PK-08 (Peshawar-VIII)
- Constituency PK-09 (Peshawar-IX)
- Constituency PK-10 (Peshawar-X)
- Constituency PK-11 (Peshawar-XI)
