= Arbab Alamgir Khan =

Pakistani politician

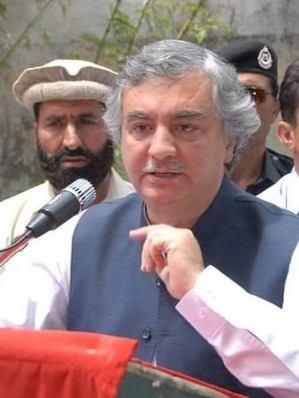

Federal Minister for Communications (Pakistan)
- In office 3 November 2008 – 16 March 2013
- Prime Minister: Yousaf Raza Gillani; Raja Pervaiz Ashraf

Member of the National Assembly of Pakistan
- In office 17 March 2008 – 16 March 2013
- Constituency: NA-29 (Peshawar-II)

Personal details
- Born: 1 July 1961 (age 65) Peshawar, Pakistan
- Party: Pakistan Peoples Party (2002–2023)
- Other political affiliations: Independent (2023–present)
- Spouse: Asma Arbab Alamgir
- Children: 3 (including Arbab Zarak Khan)
- Parent: Arbab Jehangir Khan (father)
- Relatives: Shehzad Arbab (cousin)
- Education: Khyber Medical College; University of Edinburgh
- Occupation: Politician, Physician

Dr. Arbab Alamgir Khan (ارباب عالمگیر خان; born 1 July 1961) is a Pakistani politician and physician who served as the Federal Minister for Communications (Pakistan) from 2008 to 2013. A prominent figure in Khyber Pakhtunkhwa politics, he was a senior leader of the Pakistan Peoples Party (PPP) for over two decades before his resignation in November 2023.

He is the son of Arbab Jehangir Khan, a former Chief Minister of Khyber Pakhtunkhwa who remained undefeated in his political career.

== Early life and education ==
Arbab Alamgir Khan was born on 1 July 1961 in Peshawar into the influential Arbab family of the Khalil tribe in Tehkal Bala. His father, Arbab Jehangir Khan (1936–2007), was a veteran politician who served as the Chief Minister of Khyber Pakhtunkhwa and held multiple federal ministries.

Khan completed his early education in Peshawar and went on to attend Khyber Medical College, where he earned his MBBS degree in 1987. He later moved to the United Kingdom for postgraduate studies, obtaining a diploma in Internal Medicine from the University of Edinburgh.

== Political career ==
=== Early years and 2002 election ===
Khan entered active politics following in his father's footsteps. He contested the 2002 Pakistani general election for the National Assembly of Pakistan from constituency NA-29 (Peshawar-II) as a candidate of the Pakistan Peoples Party (PPP). However, he was unsuccessful, securing 15,771 votes and losing to Maulana Rehmat Ullah of the Muttahida Majlis-e-Amal (MMA).

=== Federal Minister (2008–2013) ===
In the 2008 Pakistani general election, Khan again contested from NA-2 (Peshawar-II) on a PPP ticket. He won the seat with 34,443 votes, defeating his relation, and political rival Arbab Najib Ullah Khan Khalil of the Awami National Party (ANP).

Following the PPP's victory, he was inducted into the federal cabinet of Prime Minister Yousaf Raza Gillani on 3 November 2008 and was appointed as the Federal Minister for Communications (Pakistan). He retained this portfolio when Raja Pervaiz Ashraf became Prime Minister in June 2012, serving until the government's tenure ended in March 2013.

As minister, he oversaw major infrastructure projects, including the expansion of the National Highway network and rehabilitation efforts following the 2010 Pakistan floods.

=== Electoral setbacks (2013–2018) ===
Khan ran for re-election in the 2013 Pakistani general election from NA-2 (Peshawar-II) but was defeated by Hamid Ul Haq of the Pakistan Tehreek-e-Insaf (PTI), securing 10,666 votes.

In the 2018 Pakistani general election, he changed his constituency to NA-30 (Peshawar-IV). He secured 14,593 votes but lost to his relation, the PTI candidate, Sher Ali Arbab.

=== Resignation from PPP ===
On 18 November 2023, Arbab Alamgir Khan announced his resignation from the Pakistan Peoples Party. He cited long-standing grievances with the central leadership regarding their neglect of the party's Khyber Pakhtunkhwa chapter and internal organizational conflicts as the primary reasons for his departure. While his wife, Asma Arbab Alamgir, resigned from her party office, she remained a member of the party; however, Arbab Alamgir formally parted ways with the PPP.

== Controversies ==
=== Assets Beyond Means case ===
In 2017, the National Accountability Bureau (NAB) Khyber Pakhtunkhwa initiated an inquiry against Arbab Alamgir Khan and his wife, Asma Arbab Alamgir, for allegedly accumulating assets disproportionate to their known sources of income. In December 2018, NAB filed a reference alleging that the couple possessed unexplained assets worth approximately PKR 332 million.

The assets in question included a bungalow in Sector G-11/3 and F-7/2 in Islamabad, prize bonds, and foreign properties in the United Kingdom (specifically in Mitcham and Paddington) and the United Arab Emirates.

Khan was indicted by an accountability court in January 2019. He pleaded not guilty, terming the charges as political victimization and asserting that the properties were ancestral and duly declared in his tax returns.

== Personal life ==
Arbab Alamgir Khan is married to Asma Arbab Alamgir, who is also a politician and served as a Member of the National Assembly (MNA) on a reserved seat. The couple has three sons, including Arbab Zarak Khan, who has also entered politics.

He is the son of Arbab Jehangir Khan, who served as the 8th Chief Minister of Khyber Pakhtunkhwa. His cousin, Shehzad Arbab, is a retired civil servant who served as the Chief Secretary of Khyber Pakhtunkhwa and later as a Special Assistant to the Prime Minister.
