= PK-80 Peshawar-IX =

Constituency for the Khyber Pakhtunkhwa Assembly, in Pakistan

- Constituency for the Khyber Pakhtunkhwa Assembly
- Region: Peshawar University City and Peshawar City areas of Peshawar District

Current constituency
- Created: 2018
- Party: Pakistan Tehreek-e-Insaf
- Member: Pir Fida Muhammad
- Created from: PK-04 Peshawar-IV and PK-05 Peshawar-V

PK-80 Peshawar-IX (پی کے-80 پشاور-9) is a constituency for the Khyber Pakhtunkhwa Assembly of the Khyber Pakhtunkhwa province of Pakistan.

== Members of Assembly ==
=== 2018-2022 PK-74 Peshawar-IX ===
Election	Member	Party
2018	Pir Fida Muhammad	PTI

== Elections 2018 ==
Pir Fida Muhammad of Pakistan Tehreek-e-Insaf won the seat by getting 19,379 votes.

Provincial election 2018: PK-74 Peshawar-IX
Party	Candidate	Votes	%
PTI	Syed Muhammad Ishtiaq	19,379	43.47
ANP	Muhammad Ibrar	8,271	18.55
MMA	Atif uf Rehman	8,122	18.22
PPP	Arbab Zarak Khan	6,186	13.88
AAT	Kareem ullah	1,546	3.47
PML(N)	Syed Haider Shah	843	1.83
Independent	Abdul Raheem	234	0.52
Turnout		45,990	40.94
Valid ballots		44,581	96.93
Rejected ballots		1,409	3.07
Majority		11,108	24.92
Registered electors		1,12,332	
PTI win (new seat)			

== See also ==
- PK-79 Peshawar-VIII
- PK-81 Peshawar-X
