= Anwar Nasim =

Pakistani scientist (1935–2024)

- Born: 7 December 1935 (age 90); Pasrur, Pakistan
- Died: September 1, 2024; Toronto, Canada
- Education: Forman Christian College; University of the Punjab; University of Edinburgh
- Awards: Gold Medal in MSc (1957); Civil Award "Pride of Performance"(1995); Civil Award "Sitara-e-Imtiaz"(1999)
- Scientific career
- Fields: Biochemical genetics Molecular genetics Mechanisms of DNA repair Environmental mutagenesis
- Workplaces: Atomic Energy of Canada Limited; National Research Council (Canada); Max Planck Institute of Biochemistry; University of Ottawa; Stanford University; Carleton University; King Faisal Specialist Hospital; Committee on Scientific and Technological Cooperation; Punjab University; Government College University; Government College, Multan

Anwar Nasim (7 December 1935 – 1 September 2024) was a Pakistani molecular biologist and geneticist who was the president of Pakistan Academy of Sciences from 2015 to 2017.

== Early life and education ==
Anwar was born in a village near Pasrur in Sialkot District of Pakistan. His father was in the police service, so Anwar spent his childhood in different cities. He got his early education from Sialkot. In 1951 he passed his matric exam from Lahore. In 1953 he passed his F.Sc. exam in pre-medical from Forman Christian College Lahore. Then in 1955 he did BSc. in molecular biology from Gordon College, Rawalpindi and got first position. In 1957, he got his MSc. degree in botany from the University of the Punjab, Lahore. In 1962 he got a scholarship and went to Glasgow, Scotland. In 1966 he got PhD in Biochemical Genetics from University of Edinburgh.

== Career and higher education ==
Nasim began his career as a lecturer in Govt. College, Multan and then Government College, Lahore.

From 1966 to 1973, he was a research officer in Atomic Energy of Canada Ltd. From 1973 to 1989, he was senior research officer in National Research Council of Canada. During this period he passed a sabbatical year (1978–79) at Max Planck Institute, Tübingen, Germany, and the Biology Department of Stanford University. From 1983 to 1989, he taught as adjunct professor in Department of Microbiology and Immunology, University of Ottawa and from 1984 to 1989 as adjunct professor in Department of Biology Carleton University, Ottawa. From 1989 to 1993, he worked as principal scientist and head, Molecular Genetics Group, Biology and Medical Research Department, King Faisal Specialist Hospital and Research Centre, Riyadh, Saudi Arabia. From 1994 to 1996, he was executive secretary in Pakistan Academy of Sciences, Islamabad. In August 1996 he was appointed as adviser science, COMSTECH, Islamabad.

== International involvements ==
Nasim worked at the Nuclear Institute for Agriculture and Biology (NIAB), Faisalabad in 1981 and at Centre for Advanced Molecular Biology, Punjab University, Lahore in 1985. He was also member of the teaching faculty of the UNESCO Regional Training Course on gene cloning held in Singapore in 1983.

In 1978 he was chairman of the organizing committee for the International Symposium on DNA repair, Mutation and Human III Health held in Ottawa, Canada. He was also international Coordinator and Member of the executive committee for the XVI International Congress of Genetics, Toronto, Canada held in 1988.

== Research and books ==
Nasim published more than one hundred scientific papers in prestigious international journals worldwide since 1965.

Some of the books written by Nasim are:

- Hurst, A. and NASIM, A. (1984). Repairable Lesions in Microorganisms. Academic Press, New York.
- Dillon, J.R., NASIM, A., Nestmann, E.R. (1985). Recombinant DNA Methodology. John Wiley & Sons, New York. Translated into Japanese.
- NASIM, A., Young, P. and Johnson, B.F. (1989). Molecular Biology of the Fission Yeast. Academic Press, New York.
- Chopra, V.L. and NASIM, A. (1990). Genetic Engineering and Biotechnology. Oxford & IBH Publishing Co. Pvt. Ltd., New Delhi, India.
- NASIM, A. (1992). Genetic Engineering - State of the Art, 150 pages. A monograph prepared for Islamic Educational Scientific and Cultural Organization (ISESCO) Rabat, Morocco . Translated into Arabic and French.
- Kauser A. Malik, NASIM, A. and Ahmed M. Khalid (1995) Biotechnology for sustainable development. (NIBGE), Faisalabad

== Honours and awards ==
Some of Dr. Anwar's awards are:

- Gold Medal in MSc (1957)
- Academic roll of Honour Govt. College, Lahore . (1958)
- Chairman, Committee on Environmental Mutagenesis, Genetics Society of Canada, 1976–1977.
- Member of Teaching Faculty of the UNESCO Regional Training Course on Gene cloning held in Singapore, 1983.
- Chairman, Committee on Genetic Engineering and Biotechnology, Genetic Society of Canada, 1983–1984.
- Elected Fellow of Third World Academy of Sciences, 1987.
- Elected Foreign Fellow of the Pakistan Academy of Sciences, 1988.
- Elected Fellow of Islamic Academy of Sciences, 1998.
- Elected Fellow of Pakistan Academy of Medical Sciences, 2000.
- International coordinator and member of the executive committee for the XVI International Congress of Genetics, Toronto, 1988.
- Consultant and member of international advisory committee for National Institute for Biotechnology and Genetic Engineering (NIBGE), Faisalabad (1993 - To Date).
- Honorary professor in H.E.J. Research Institute of Chemistry, University of Karachi, Karachi, Pakistan. (1993)
- Overseas Pakistani's Institute (OPI) award for outstanding services for the cause of science in Pakistan. (1995).
- Civil Award "Pride of Performance" in Molecular Genetics (1995) (by the president of Pakistan)
- Civil Award "Sitara-e-Imtiaz" in Molecular Genetics 1999.
- Chairman National Commission on Biotechnology, Ministry of Science and Technology, Government of Pakistan . (2001-To Date)
- Chairman Third World Academy of Sciences (TWAS) Chapter in Pakistan (July 2002)
- Elected general secretary Pakistan Academy of Sciences (PAS) (Jan 2012)
- Elected president of Pakistan Academy of Sciences (PAS) (Jan 2015)
- Patron Broader Middle East and North Africa Association of Young Scientists (BAYS) Since 2009.
