= Kauser =

Kauser is a surname and given name. Notable people with the name include:

- Jakab Kauser (1878–1925), Hungarian track and field athlete
- Joseph Kauser, police officer present at the killing of Philando Castile
- Kauser Edappagath, Indian judge
- Kauser Abdullah Malik, Pakistani agriculture scientist and educationist
