= Kazim Niaz =

Chief Secretary of Khyber Pakhtunkhwa

Dr. Kazim Niaz

Chief Secretary Khyber Pakhtunkhwa
- In office October 2019 – November 2021
- Governor: Shah Farman
- Chief Minister: Mahmood Khan
- Preceded by: Muhammad Salim
- Succeeded by: Shahzad Khan Bangash

Personal details
- Occupation: Civil servant, Pakistan Administrative Service

Kazim Niaz is a retired Pakistani civil servant BPS-22 who served as Chief Secretary Khyber Pakhtunkhwa from October 2019 to November 2021. He has also served as Chief Secretary Gilgit Baltistan. He also owns a welfare organization Sabawoon Volunteers Association which is a free school for poor children in Pakistan.

== Personal life ==
Niaz belongs to Rajar area of Charsadda District.

His father Prof Jahanzeb Niaz, who died in 2015, was an influential name in Pashto literature as an author and researcher.
