= Arbab Zarak Khan =

Pakistani politician

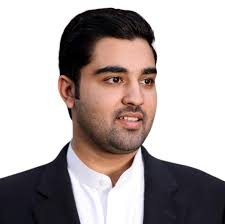

Member of the Provincial Assembly of Khyber Pakhtunkhwa
- Incumbent
- Assumed office 29 February 2024
- Constituency: PK-80 Peshawar-IX

Personal details
- Born: Peshawar, Khyber Pakhtunkhwa, Pakistan
- Party: Pakistan Peoples Party (PPP)
- Parents: Arbab Alamgir Khan (father); Asma Arbab Alamgir (mother)
- Occupation: Politician

Arbab Zarak Khan is a Pakistani politician who serves as a member of the Provincial Assembly of Khyber Pakhtunkhwa (PAKP) from the constituency PK-80 (Peshawar-IX). He was elected in the 2024 Khyber Pakhtunkhwa provincial election as a candidate of the Pakistan Peoples Party (PPP). He belongs to the prominent Arbab family of Peshawar, which has a significant history in the politics of Khyber Pakhtunkhwa.

== Early life and family ==
Arbab Zarak Khan was born into a politically influential family from the Tehkal area of Peshawar. He is the son of Arbab Alamgir Khan, a senior leader of the Pakistan Peoples Party who served as the Federal Minister for Communications, and Asma Arbab Alamgir, who served as a Member of the National Assembly of Pakistan and as an advisor to the Federal Minister of States and Frontier Regions.

His paternal grandfather, Arbab Jehangir Khan (1936–2007), was a heavyweight politician who served as the Chief Minister of Khyber Pakhtunkhwa (then NWFP) and held various federal ministerial portfolios. The family resides at "Arbab House" in Jehangir Abad, Tehkal Bala, Peshawar.

== Political career ==
=== 2024 General Elections ===
Zarak Khan contested the 2024 Pakistani general election for the Provincial Assembly of Khyber Pakhtunkhwa seat PK-80 (Peshawar-IX) on a Pakistan Peoples Party ticket. He won the seat by securing 23,311 votes, defeating his main rival, Hamid Ul Haq of the Pakistan Tehreek-e-Insaf (PTI), who secured 10,251 votes. His victory was seen as a resurgence for the PPP in a district where the party had faced stiff competition in previous elections.

=== Parliamentary contributions ===
Following his induction into the assembly on 29 February 2024, Zarak Khan was appointed to several standing committees. He is a member of the Standing Committee No. 20 on Planning and Development Department. He also serves on the Standing Committee on Energy, where he has been involved in reviewing hydropower projects in the province.

=== Arbab Niaz Stadium controversy ===
In early 2026, a significant political controversy arose when the Khyber Pakhtunkhwa provincial government, led by the PTI, announced a decision to rename the historic Arbab Niaz Stadium in Peshawar to "Imran Khan Cricket Stadium." Arbab Zarak Khan, along with other family members, strongly opposed this move.

On 2 February 2026, Zarak Khan addressed the media, terming the decision "irrational" and "unacceptable." He stated that the stadium was named after his relative, Arbab Niaz Muhammad Khan, in recognition of his services to the city, and that renaming it was a politically motivated attempt to divert attention from governance issues. He announced that the Arbab family would challenge the decision in court.

== See also ==
- Arbab Alamgir Khan
- Asma Arbab Alamgir
- PK-80 Peshawar-IX
- Provincial Assembly of Khyber Pakhtunkhwa
