= Wajid Khan =

Wajid Khan may refer to:

- Wajid Khan, Baron Khan of Burnley (born 1979), British Labour Party politician and MEP
- Wajid Khan (Canadian politician) or Wajid Ali Khan (born 1946), Conservative Party politician and businessman
- Wajid Khan (composer) or Wajid Ali Khan (1977–2020), part of the Sajid–Wajid musical duo
- Wajid Ullah Khan, Pakistani politician

== See also ==
- Wahid Khan
