= Ibrahim Khan Qasmi =

Pakistani politician

President of PRHP
- Incumbent
- Assumed office February 2012

Member of the Provincial Assembly of Khyber Pakhtunkhwa
- In office 29 September 2002 – 11 October 2007
- Constituency: PF-04 (Peshawar-IV)

Personal details
- Party: PRHP (2012-present)
- Other political affiliations: Sipah-e-Sahaba Pakistan (2002-2012)

Hakeem Muhammad Ibrahim Khan Qasmi (Urdu: حکیم محمد ابراہیم قاسمی) is a Pakistani politician who served as a member of the Provincial Assembly of Khyber Pakhtunkhwa and a former provincial leader of Sipah-e-Sahaba Pakistan, currently serving as the President of Pakistan Rah-e-Haq Party since February 2012.

== Political career ==
He was elected to the Provincial Assembly of NWFP as an independent candidate from Constituency PF-04 (Peshawar-IV) in the 2002 Pakistani general election in the Constituency.

He is In February 2012, he founded Pakistan Rah-e-Haq Party in Peshawar.

== See also ==
- Pakistan Rah-e-Haq Party
