= Services General Administration and Coordination Department (Sindh) =

Pakistani provincial governmental department

The Sindh Services, General Administration, Coordination Department (SGA&CD) is an influential department of the Government of Sindh in Pakistan. The SGA&CD is administered by the Chief Secretary Sindh.

Muhammad Iqbal Memon (PAS) is the current Additional Chief Secretary Services. The department deals with postings, promotions, and transfers in the Government of Sindh. This posting is given to a senior Officer in the Pakistan Administrative Service usually of the rank of BS-21.

The SGA&CD runs the Government of Sindh 'Protocol Cell'. It is also in charge of all Sindh Government Official residences and Official vehicles. One of the main functions of the SGA&CD is to approve funds before being sent to the Finance Department, dealing with the Benevolent Fund along with a few other things.

Almost all Sindh Government assets come under the SGA&CD, notably such as the Government Officers Residence Colony, Sindh Government Officers Club, Chief Ministers Helicopter Flight GoS. The most sensitive affair of the SGA&CD is to formulate the minutes of Government of Sindh Cabinet Meetings and to get them approved by the Chief Minister and Chief Secretary. The current Secretary of the Department is Mr. Saeed Ahmed Mangnejo, and Officer of the Secretariat Service (BS-20).
