= NA-31 Peshawar-IV =

Constituency of the National Assembly of Pakistan

- Constituency for the National Assembly of Pakistan
- District: Peshawar city (partly) and Cantonment areas of Peshawar District
- Province: Khyber Pakhtunkhwa
- Electorate: 399,278

Current constituency
- Created: 1970
- Party: Pakistan Tehreek-e-Insaf
- Member: Sher Ali Arbab
- Created from: NA-1 (Peshawar-I); NA-2 (Peshawar-II); NA-3 (Peshawar-III)

NA-31 Peshawar-IV (این اے-31، پشاور-٤) is a constituency for the National Assembly of Pakistan.

== Area ==
During the delimitation of 2018, NA-31 (Peshawar-IV) acquired areas from three former constituencies namely NA-1 (Peshawar-I), NA-2 (Peshawar-II), and NA-3 (Peshawar-III) with most areas coming from NA-2 (Peshawar-II), the areas of Peshawar which are part of this constituency are listed below alongside the former constituency name from which they were acquired:

Areas acquired from NA-1 (Peshawar-I)

- Bhana Mari

Areas acquired from NA-2 (Peshawar-II)

- Ziarat Wali Muhammad Sahib
- Gulberg
- Kotla Mohsin Khan
- Landi Arbab
- Nodeh Payan
- Peshawar University
- Police Colony
- Hayatabad
- Census Charge No. 17 (excluding Darmagi, Irrigation Colony Warsak Road, Census Circle No. 3, and Census Circle No. 6)
- Peshawar University Town Committee
- Peshawar Cantonment
- Reggi Lalma

Areas acquired from NA-3 Peshawar-III

- Reggi Ufatazai

== Members of Parliament ==
=== 1970–1977: NW-2 Peshawar-II ===
Election	Member	Party
1970	Ghulam Faruque Khan Khattak	NAP

=== 1977–2002: NA-2 Peshawar-II ===
Election	Member	Party
1977	Arbab Jehangir Khan Khalil	PPP
1985	Muhammad Salim Khan Khalil	Independent
1988	Bahadur Khan	PPP
1990	Arbab Jehangir Khan Khalil	ANP
1993	Arbab Jehangir Khan Khalil	PPP
1997	Arbab Jehangir Khan Khalil	ANP

=== 2002–2018: NA-2 Peshawar-II ===
Election	Member	Party
2002	Mulana Rehmat Ullah	MMA
2008	Arbab Alamgir Khan Khalil	PPPP
2013	Hamid-ul-Haq	PTI

=== 2018–2022: NA-30 Peshawar-IV ===
Election	Member	Party
2018	Sher Ali Arbab	PTI

=== 2023–present: NA-31 Peshawar-IV ===
Election	Member	Party
2024	Sher Ali Arbab	SIC

== 1985 general election ==
The 1985 General Election was held as a non-party based election. Seleem Khan Khalil won this election.

1985 General Election: Peshawar-II
Party	Candidate	Votes	%
Independent	Salem Khan Khalil	Winner	N/A
Independent	Col (R) Niaz Mohammad Arbab	Runner up	N/A

== 2002 general election ==
2002 General Election: NA-2 (Peshawar-II)
Party	Candidate	Votes	%	±%
MMA	Maulana Rehmat Ullah	37,728	67.37	N/A
PPP	Arbab Alamgir Khan	15,771	28.16	N/A
PAT	Khalid Ayub	1,575	2.81	N/A
QWP	Abdul Manan Akhunzada Advocate	926	1.66	N/A
Majority		21,957	39.21	N/A
Turnout		56,000	26.49	N/A
MMA gain from ANP		Swing	N/A	

A total of 1,367 votes were rejected.

== 2008 general election ==
2008 General Election: NA-2 (Peshawar-II)
Party	Candidate	Votes	%	±%
PPPP	Dr. Arbab Alamgir Khan Khalil	34,443	45.15	+16.99
ANP	Arbab Najeeb Ullah Khan Khalil	23,992	31.45	
MMA	Maulana Rehmat Ullah*	7,346	9.63	−57.74
Independent	Asif Ullah Qasmi	5,326	6.98	
PML-N	Syed Zahoor Shah	3,103	4.07	
PML	Malik Najab Gul Khalil Advocate	1,560	2.04	
Independent	Dr Taj Muhammad Khan	210	0.27	
Independent	Muhammad Atteq ur Rehman	174	0.23	
Independent	Haji Aftab Muhammad	139	0.18	
Majority		10,451	13.70	
Turnout		76,293	24.73	−1.76
PPPP gain from MMA				

A total of 2,003 votes were rejected.

== 2013 general election ==
The 2013 General Election was held on May 11, 2013, and Engineer Hamid Ul Haq standing for PTI succeeded to the National Assembly after winning 79,125 votes. Ul Haq beat former Federal Minister for Communication Arbab Alamgir Khan of the PPPP.

2013 General Election: NA-2 (Peshawar-II)
Party	Candidate	Votes	%	±%
PTI	Hamid Ul Haq	79,125	55.71	
JUI-F	Muhammad Saeed Jan	18,787	13.23	
ANP	Arbab Najeeb Ullah Khan	12,137	8.55	−22.90
PPPP	Arbab Alamgir Khan	10,666	7.51	−37.64
JI	Muhammad Iqbal Khalil	8,020	5.65	
PML-N	Abdul Bari	5.159	3.63	−0.44
MDM	Qazi Saif Ullah Jan	3,477	2.45	
QWP (S)	Malik Haider Khan	2,242	1.58	
Independent	Intizar Ali Khan Khalil	577	0.41	
Independent	Ishaq Hussain	448	0.31	
Independent	Muhammad Atiq ur Rehman	419	0.29	
Independent	Saleem Khan	275	0.19	
Independent	Iqtidar Ahmad Afridi	263	0.19	
Independent	Khadim Hussain	162	0.11	
Independent	Muhammad Ibrahim Khalil	156	0.11	
Independent	Aasir Sheraz	61	0.04	
Independent	Safeer Ullah	57	0.04	
Majority		60,338	42.48	
Turnout		142,031	43.45	+18.72
PTI gain from PPPP				

A total of 2,408 votes were rejected.

== 2018 general election ==
General elections were held on 25 July 2018.

General election 2018: NA-30 (Peshawar-IV)
Party	Candidate	Votes	%	±%
PTI	Sher Ali Arbab	73,781	60.27	
MMA	Arbab Najeebullah Khan	18,111	14.80	
PPP	Arbab Alamgir Khan	14,593	11.92	
ANP	Muhammad Alamgir Khan Khalil	11,514	9.41	
Others	Others (four candidates)	4,413	3.60	
Turnout		125,547	40.64	▼2.81
Total valid votes		122,412	97.50	
Rejected ballots		3,135	2.50	
Majority		55,670	45.47	
Registered electors		308,891		
PTI hold		Swing	N/A	

== 2024 general election ==
General elections were held on 8 February 2024. Sher Ali Arbab won the election with 82,985 votes.

General election 2024: NA-31 Peshawar-IV
Party	Candidate	Votes	%	±%
PTI	Sher Ali Arbab (Note: Filed nomination papers as PTI candidate but ECP allowed him to run as an Independent)	82,985	58.00	▼2.27
PPP	Arbab Alamgir Khan	22,543	15.76	▲3.84
JUI (F)	Muhammad Saeed Jan	14,560	10.18	N/A
ANP	Syed Haroon Shah	10,101	7.06	▼2.35
Others	Others (four candidates)	12,889	9.01	
Turnout		146,190	36.61	▼4.03
Total valid votes		143,078	97.87	
Rejected ballots		3,114	2.13	
Majority		60,442	42.24	▼3.23
Registered electors		399,278		

== See also ==
- NA-30 Peshawar-III
- NA-32 Peshawar-V
