= Shahzad Khan Bangash =

Chief Secretary of Khyber Pakhtunkhwa

Chief Secretary Khyber Pakhtunkhwa
- In office November 2021 – 1 February 2023
- Governor: Shah Farman; Haji Ghulam Ali
- Chief Minister: Mahmood Khan; Azam Khan (caretaker)
- Preceded by: Kazim Niaz
- Succeeded by: Imdad Ullah Bosal

Personal details
- Born: Behzadi Chakar Kot, Kohat District
- Education: Cadet College Kohat Edwardes College Peshawar Khyber Medical College
- Occupation: Civil servant, Pakistan Administrative Service

Shahzad Khan Bangash is a retired Pakistani civil servant who served as Chief Secretary Khyber Pakhtunkhwa from November 2021 until January 2023.

Bangash was born in Behzadi Chakar Kot, Kohat District, He did his matriculation from Cadet College Kohat, FSc from Edwardes College Peshawar, and MBBS from Khyber Medical College, Peshawar.

== See also ==
- Shahab Ali Shah

Shahab Ali Shah (BS-21 Pakistan Administrative Service) is currently serving as Chief Secretary of khyber Pakhtunkhwa province of Pakistan. Earlier, he worked as Additional Chief Secretary Balochistan.
