= Pir Fida Muhammad =

Pakistani politician

Member of the Provincial Assembly of Khyber Pakhtunkhwa
- In office 13 August 2018 – 18 January 2023
- Constituency: PK-74 (Peshawar-IX)

Personal details
- Party: PTI (2018-present)

Pir Fida Muhammad is a Pakistani politician who had been a member of the Provincial Assembly of Khyber Pakhtunkhwa from August 2018 till January 2023. He served as member of the FATA tribunal from 2012 to 2015, and also served as legal representative of Khyber Teaching Hospital Peshawar. He is a prominent lawyer and has been practicing law for almost 50 years.

== Political career ==
He was elected to the Provincial Assembly of Khyber Pakhtunkhwa as a candidate of Pakistan Tehreek-e-Insaf from Constituency PK-74 (Peshawar-IX) in the 2018 Pakistani general election.
