= Muhammad Yusuf Hashmi =

Punjabi educator (1887–1960)

Muhammad Yousaf Hashmi
- محمد يوسف الهاشمي
- Born: 1887; Sialkot, Punjab
- Died: 1960 (aged 72–73); Lahore, Punjab
- Education: Forman Christian College
- Occupation: Educator
- Awards: University of the Punjab Gold Medal; British-Indian titles of Khan Sahib and Khan Bahadur

Khan Bahadur Muhammad Yusuf Syed-Al-Hashmi (1887–1960; Sialkot, Punjab) was an Indian educator who taught English during the British Raj. He advocated for the study of multiple languages, both Western and non-Western, with a particular emphasis on education and linguistic proficiency. His work has also expanded educational access for Europeans in British India and for Muslims in South Asia. Syed-Al-Hashmi also supported the Pakistan Movement through his writings and public statements.

== Early life and family ==
Hashmi was born into an upper-class Muslim Syed family (Hashmi-Qureshi) in the Sialkot District, then part of British India. He received his early education at local schools and studied English, Arabic, Persian, and Hindustani/Urdu. He came from a family historically engaged in public service and received training in theology, law, and public administration. His relatives, notable in Indian public life, lived across South Asia. These relatives included Pir Syed, Jammat Ali Shah (or Pir Syed Jamaat Ali Shah) of Ali Pur Syedan (also known as Alipur Sharif) in the Sialkot District. The Hashmi-Qureshi families of central and southern Punjab trace their origins to the Middle East and regions across Central and South Asia.

== Career ==
Hashmi earned an M.A. in English from Forman Christian College in Lahore, receiving a position at the University of the Punjab. He completed his studies in English and Arabic in 1909. Upon graduation, he was offered teaching posts at Forman Christian College, The Punjab University, and Aligarh Muslim University, but he chose to remain at his alma mater at the invitation of J. C. R. Ewing.

After a brief tenure there, he joined the Indian Education Service and moved to Calcutta, then the seat of the British Government of India and a major educational and cultural hub. He taught English, Bengali, Hindi, and Arabic at Madrasa 'Aliya, established by Warren Hastings in 1781, and lectured at the University of Calcutta. He also served as superintendent of Baker Hostel and mentored students who later became prominent political leaders, including Sheikh Mujibur Rahman, members of the Suhrawardy and Bogra families, and others, who later assumed leadership roles in South Asia.

He became the first Indian appointed as principal of Madrasa Alia, one of the earliest modern institutions of higher education in British India. At the request of students, colleagues, and friends, including A. K. Fazlul Huq—then Mayor of Calcutta, later Chief Minister of undivided Bengal, and the statesman who would move the Pakistan Resolution—he remained in Calcutta by joining the Bengal Senior Education Service. He served there until his retirement in 1943.

In recognition of his contributions to education, the British Government of India and the Crown awarded him the titles of Khan Sahib and Khan Bahadur.

After retiring in 1943, Hashmi returned to Sialkot and dedicated himself to the Pakistan Movement. He became an advisor to several contemporary academic and political figures and played a consultative role in the 1944 Sialkot Convention, which gave the All India Muslim League a decisive lead in the undivided Punjab. Along with colleagues in Punjab, he founded the Jinnah Islamiyah College (later Government Jinnah Islamiyah College) in Sialkot in 1951. He was appointed the first principal of the college by the board of trustees. He accepted the appointment but declined the offered salary, saying his British pension was sufficient. He continued to serve the college through much of the 1950s.

== Later years ==
After completing his tenure as the first principal of Jinnah Islamiyah College (later Government Jinnah Islamiyah College) in Sialkot, Hashmi moved to Lahore, where he resided until he died in 1960.

== Writings ==
Muhammad Yusuf Hashmi primarily wrote works on Islamic law, as well as textbooks and teaching materials for English, Arabic, and Persian studies at Madrasa 'Aliya and the University of Calcutta. A book translated by Khan Bahadur Muhammad Yusuf Syed-Al-Hashmi and Maulvi Wilayat Husain, The Fatwa-i-Qazi Khan, is considered to be one of the key Islamic law texts on marriage, dower, divorce, legitimacy, and guardianship of minors. These works were adopted in Bengal and in many modern institutions of higher education in British India, influencing educational policy discussions in several Islamic institutions.
