= Forman Christian College =

University in Lahore, Pakistan

Coordinates: 31.5221°N 74.3320°E

- Other names: FC College, FCC, FCCU
- Former name: FC College
- Motto: By love serve one another
- Type: Private nonprofit university
- Established: 1864; 162 years ago
- Chancellor: Governor of Punjab
- Rector: Jonathan Addleton
- Academic staff: 220
- Students: 9,000
- Location: Kasur Road, Lahore-54600, Punjab, Pakistan
- Campus: Residential college, 108 acres (44 ha)
- Colors
- Website: www.fccollege.edu.pk

Forman Christian College is a private nonprofit liberal arts university in Lahore, Punjab, Pakistan. It was founded in 1864 and is administered by the Presbyterian Church. The university follows an American-style curriculum.

Founded in 1864 by American Presbyterian missionary Charles William Forman, the college was initially named Mission College, and changed its name in 1894 to Forman Christian College, in honor of its founder. Forman served as an associated college of the University of Calcutta until 1947 when it became affiliated with the University of Punjab. In 2004, the government granted it university charter hence providing it with degree awarding authority.

The college was initially based in the Rang Mahal in the Walled City of Lahore, which was leased by Charles with the support from foreign missions. In 1889, it was shifted to Napier Road and was inaugurated by Henry Petty-Fitzmaurice, 5th Marquess of Lansdowne. Again, in 1940, the college was moved to its present campus on the banks of the Lahore Canal. The college remained financially autonomous until 1960 when the Pakistani government began annual grants for the college for its nursing program. The college was nationalized in 1972 and remained nationalized until 2003 when control was returned to the Presbyterian Church.

Forman is also known for its noted alumni and staff, including former Indian Prime Minister I. K. Gujral, world badminton champion Sarwan Khan, former Pakistani Presidents Farooq Leghari and Pervez Musharraf, diplomat Jamsheed Marker, journalist Kuldip Nayar, scholar Wilfred Cantwell Smith, and activist Eqbal Ahmad. As of 2020, Forman was home to 8,435 students including 3,173 Intermediate students, 4,712 Baccalaureate students and 550 graduate students. It also has 220 full-time faculty members (more than 100 of whom have PhDs) as well as an alumni population of well over 21,000. Christians make up nearly 15% of the student body while the college runs a $1 million fund to finance scholarships for its students. As of 2016, the college has been ranked ninth highest in Pakistan among medium-sized universities and is the only institution in Pakistan which is a member of the Global Liberal Arts Alliance. Jonathan S. Addleton was inaugurated as the new Rector on 31 October 2020, following the retirement of his predecessor James A. Tebbe, who was awarded the Sitara-e-Imtiaz by the President of Pakistan; James A. Tebbe was in turn was preceded by Peter H. Armacost who had previously served as president of Eckerd College in St. Petersburg, Florida.

== History ==
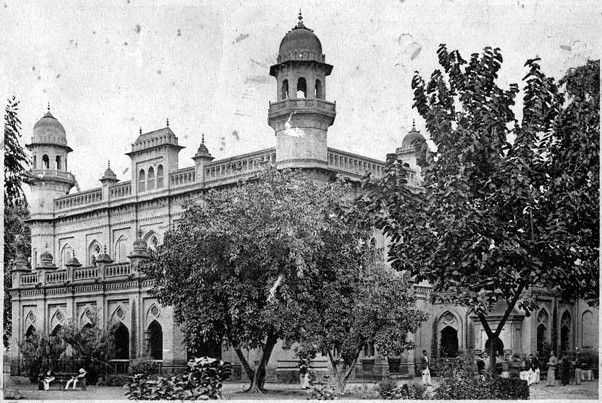
Forman Christian College in 1930

Forman Christian College was founded in Lahore, British India by Presbyterian Christian missionary Charles William Forman as Rang Mahal School, a Christian mission school. Forman arrived in Calcutta in what was then colonial India in 1847 and, two years later, settled in Lahore, British India (now in Pakistan). The school added a college department in 1865 which later became a university in 2005 known as Forman Christian College University. It started offering an American-style world-class education in Pakistan. FCCU started new postgraduate courses along with MBA in 2007.

In 1972, the government in Pakistan took over all private schools, including the one linked to Forman. In 2003, the school was given back to the Presbyterian Church (USA). Nowadays, a group of Pakistani Christian leaders oversees the college. In 2004, FCCU became a chartered university. This means they can create their own lessons, hold exams, and give out degrees. As of the fall of 2022, over 9,000 students are enrolled at the university.

Native to Lahore, Surendra Kumar Datta was a professor of history and biology from 1909 to 1914 and served as the principal of Forman Christian College from 1932 to 1942, later becoming the president of the All India Conference of Indian Christians and representing the Christian community of colonial India in the Round Table Conferences.

One of Forman's faculty members, Prof. Arthur Compton, conducted the bulk of his research on cosmic rays at FCC University for which he received the Nobel Prize in 1927.

One of Professor Compton's former students Professor Piara Singh Gill taught at the college as lecturer in Physics between 1940 and 1947. Two alumni, Sir S. S. Bhatnagar and Bashir Ahmad, laid the foundation for scientific and industrial research in both parts of South Asia by establishing ICSIR and PCSIR respectively.

The first two Science graduates of FC College University were also the first Science graduates of the University of the Punjab (1900–1902). In this way FCCU was the first to establish, in this part of the sub-continent, Departments of Biology (1898), Greek, Latin and Hebrew Languages (1895–96), Industrial Chemistry (1917), Geography (1924), setting up the Experimental Psychology Laboratory, introducing the tutorial system (1908), appointing Deans of the Faculties introducing co-educational system (1902), and establishing an alumni Association (1896). Besides this FCCU also started Software engineering, CS, and IT in 2006.

== Campus ==
Forman Christian College University has a 108-acre vast campus. As student enrollment continues to rise, ongoing efforts are directed toward improving the facilities. This includes renovations and expansions in administrative and academic buildings, as well as faculty and staff housing.

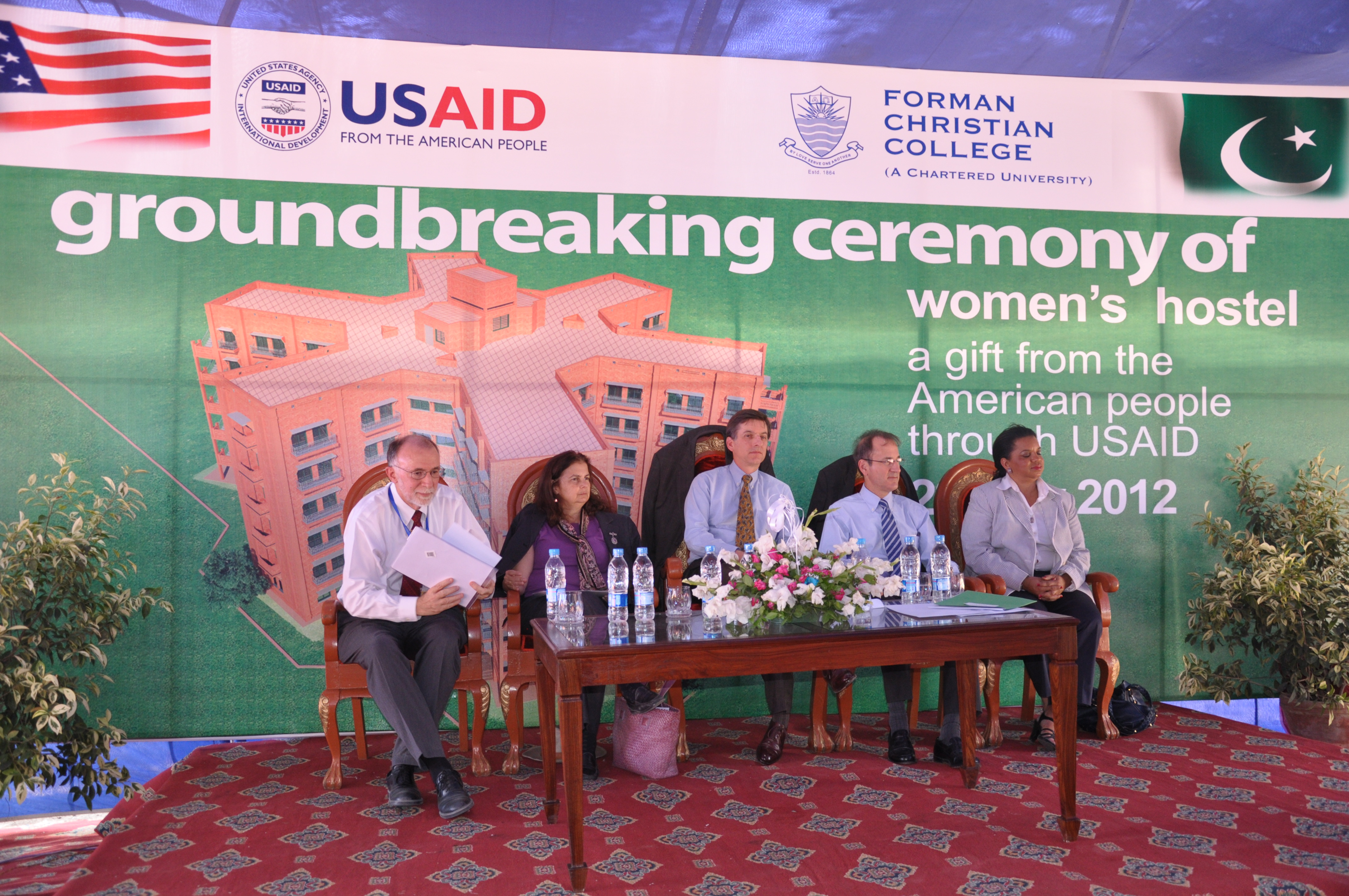
Hope Tower (Female Hostels) Ground Breaking Ceremony

Notable additions on the campus following denationalization include the Armacost Science Building, Hope Tower, Mercy Health Care facility, the Light of Hope Elementary School, and the Media Center. All of these structures signify the institution's commitment to modern education and research.

In addition, the men's hostels, originally built in the 1940s, have undergone complete renovations, now offering modern amenities and comfortable living spaces. The institution overall has four hostels for intermediate students, two for graduate and undergraduate male students and one for female students, the Hope Tower built in 2014.

Recently, the institution has constructed a 177,000 sq ft (16,400 m^{2}) Campus Center. This multipurpose facility features an auditorium, Forman Business Incubation Centre, a dining hall, meeting rooms, and offices.

In February 2026, the university administration inaugurated the Mian Nisar Elahi Pharmacy Labs. The project was completed with the assistance of the ATS Group of Industries and is expected to enhance pharmaceutical education in the University.

== Achievements ==
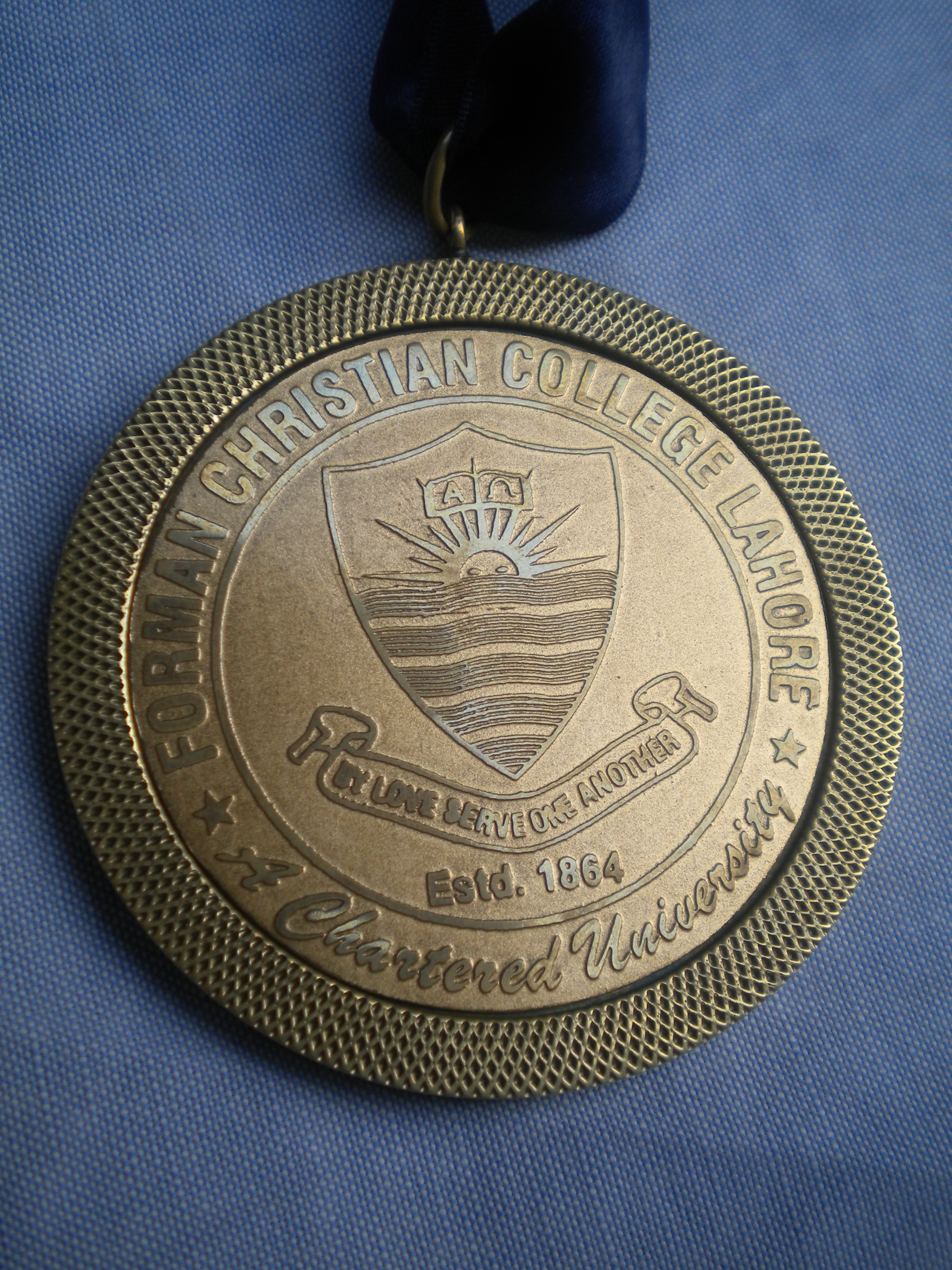

Achievements of other Formanites, as the graduates are called, include:

- Its principal J. C. R. Ewing was appointed a Knight Commander of the Order of the Indian Empire (KCIE) and served as Vice-Chancellor of the University of the Punjab from 1910 to 1917.
- Formanite—alumnus and teacher of the college—Muhammad Yusuf Hashmi became the first Indian Principal of Madrasa 'Aliya in Calcutta, was recognized as an educator of distinction in British India and was titled Khan Bahadur by the British Crown. Later he was recognized in Pakistan also for his contributions to education and the Pakistan Movement.
- Principal C. H. Rice and a faculty member, Khairat M. Ibne Rasa, became vice chancellors of the Punjab University.
- Justice Sir Mian Abdur Rashid, who was a Formanite and also the first chief justice of Pakistan, administered the oath of office to Quaid-e-Azam Muhammad Ali Jinnah as the first governor general.
- The English poet and scholar Alamgir Hashmi served as lecturer in English at Forman Christian College (early 1970s) and as faculty advisor to Folio.

== Accreditation ==
The university has designed its four-year bachelor's degree program in accordance with the standards for accreditation in the U.S., and is seeking accreditation through the New England Commission of Higher Education (NECHE).

== Commemorative stamp ==
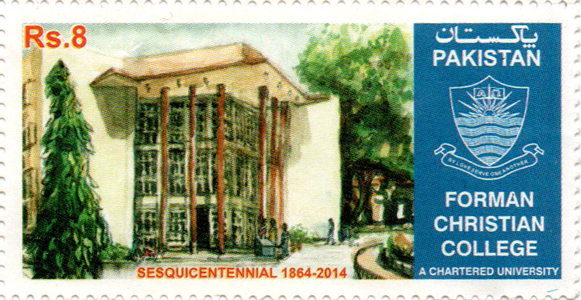
A Postage Stamp for Forman Christian College

Forman Christian College has received a commemorative postage stamp in the celebration of completing the successful 150 years. Issued by Pakistan Post, The stamp highlights a Sinclair Hall which was built to mark the centenary of FC College and was named after a devoted Principal Dr EJ Sinclair who served FCC for many years as a faculty member and Principal.

== Tradition ==
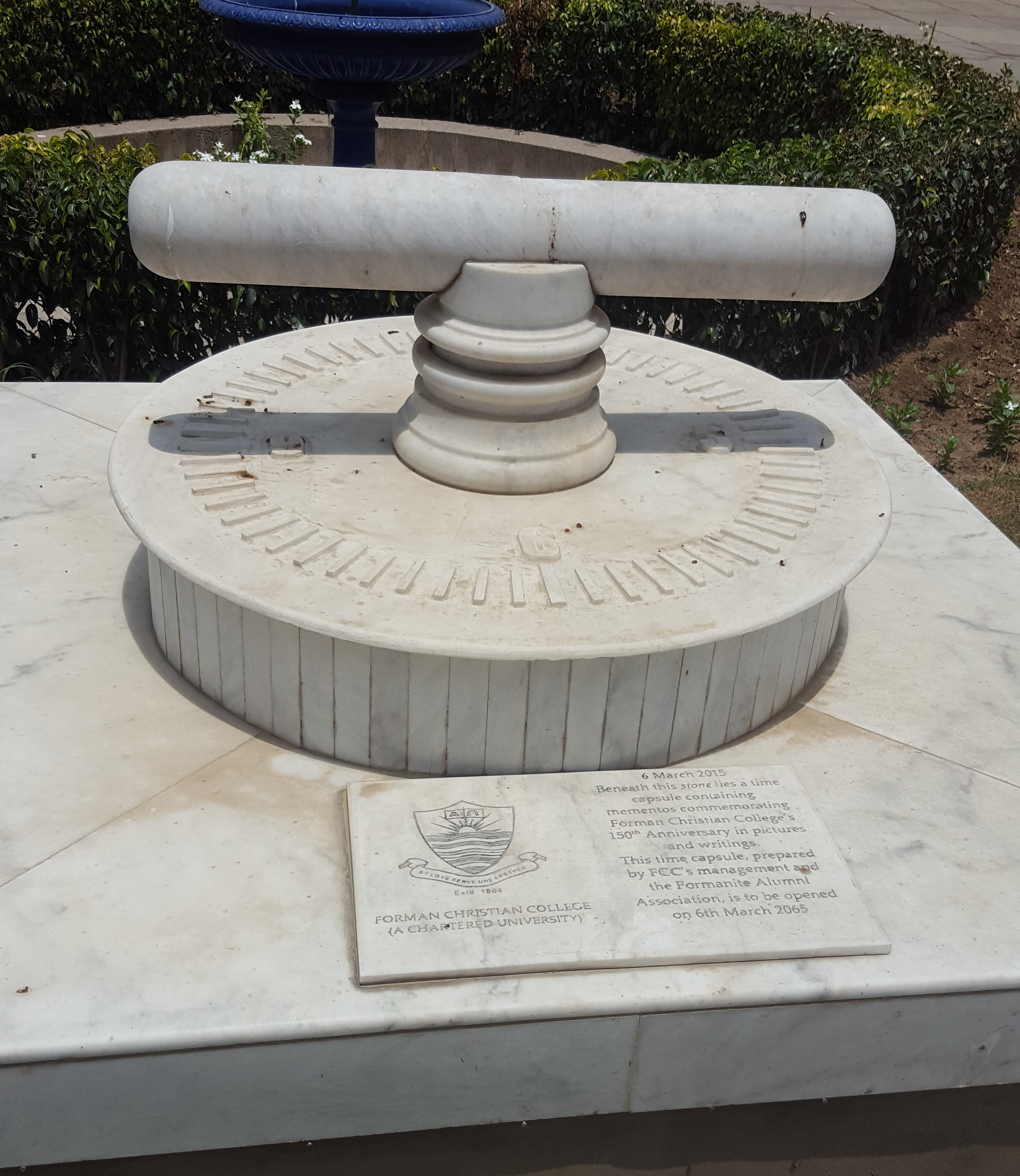
Time capsule, created in 2014

Forman Christian College University alumni and faculty buried a time capsule in 2014 during their 11th Alumni Association Reunion, marking the university's 150th year. The capsule, containing items like publications, mugs, and personal notes, was sealed in a glass cube and buried in a lined pit next to Sinclair Hall's fountain. It will be opened in fifty years.

== International linkage ==
Global Liberal Arts Alliance

The Council of Independent Colleges - USA

Association of American International Colleges and Universities

New England Commission of Higher Education (NECHE)

== Notable alumni ==
=== Politicians ===
- Surendra Kumar Datta, president of the All India Conference of Indian Christians who represented the Indian Christian community in the Round Table Conferences
- Inayatullah Khan Mashriqi, mathematician, logician, political theorist, Islamic scholar and founder of the Khaksar movement
- Yusuf Raza Gilani, the 16th prime minister of Pakistan
- Shaukat Tarin, former finance minister of Pakistan
- Jahangir Tareen, Pakistani politician and businessman.
- Inder Kumar Gujral, the 12th prime minister of India
- Parkash Singh Badal, chief minister of Indian Punjab several times and elected again in 2012.
- Muhammad Mian Soomro, former chairman of the Senate of Pakistan, former caretaker prime minister & President of Pakistan.
- Malik Barkat Ali, former Punjabi Muslim League politician
- Shah Mahmood Qureshi, Foreign Minister of Pakistan and, the vice chairman of PTI
- Shujaat Hussain, former prime minister of Pakistan and current president of PML-Q
- Chaudhry Pervaiz Elahi, former chief minister of Punjab (Pakistan)
- Rao Sikandar Iqbal (1943–2010), former Defence Minister of Pakistan
- Farooq Leghari, former president of Pakistan.
- Syed Afzal Haider, former Pakistani law minister
- Balram Jakhar (1923–2016), an Indian politician, parliamentarian, and former governor of Madhya Pradesh.
- Rafique Rajwana, Governor of Punjab.
- Kulsoom Nawaz, wife of Mian Nawaz Sharif
- Pyare Lal Kureel, Indian politician, Dalit activist and Urdu poet
- Yashwant Singh Parmar, founder and first chief minister of Himachal Pradesh, India
- Syed Abid Hussain Shah, landlord and Pakistan's central and provincial minister

=== Bureaucrats and diplomats ===
- Roedad Khan, former Secretary General Ministry of Interior.
- Jamsheed Marker, United Nations Under-secretary General, Ambassador at Large of Pakistan (honorary doctorate)
- Sajjad Saleem Hotiana, civil servant of Government of Pakistan in Grade-22

=== Judiciary ===
- Justice (retired) Wajihuddin Ahmed, Former Candidate for Presidential Election against Pervaiz Musharraf, Former Supreme Court Judge
- Justice Sardar Muhammad Raza Khan, Former Chief Justice Peshawar High Court, Supreme Court of Pakistan Judge
- Sir Abdul Rasheed, First Chief Justice of Pakistan
- Justice (retired) Tassaduq Hussain Jillani, Former Chief Justice of Pakistan

=== Educators and scholars ===
- Kauser Abdulla Malik, secretary of the National Commission on Biotechnology.
- Eqbal Ahmad, post-colonial scholar and writer
- Ishtiaq Ahmed, Professor Emeritus of Political Science, Stockholm University and Honorary Senior Fellow, Institute of South Asian Studies, National University of Singapore
- Cecil Chaudhry, a decorated war hero, who served as the Principal of St. Anthony's College (Lahore)
- Mohini Maya Das, associate national secretary of the YWCA for India, Ceylon, and Burma
- Bipan Chandra, eminent historian
- Anwar Nasim, nuclear scientist and molecular biologist
- Georg Pfeffer (1943–2020), German anthropologist
- Rama Tirtha, Indian teacher of the Hindu philosophy of Vedanta
- Khan Bahadur Muhammad Yusuf Syed-Al-Hashmi, educator, mentor, reformer, All India Muslim League and Pakistan Movement leader
- Arfa Sayeda Zehra, Pakistani educationalist and Urdu language expert

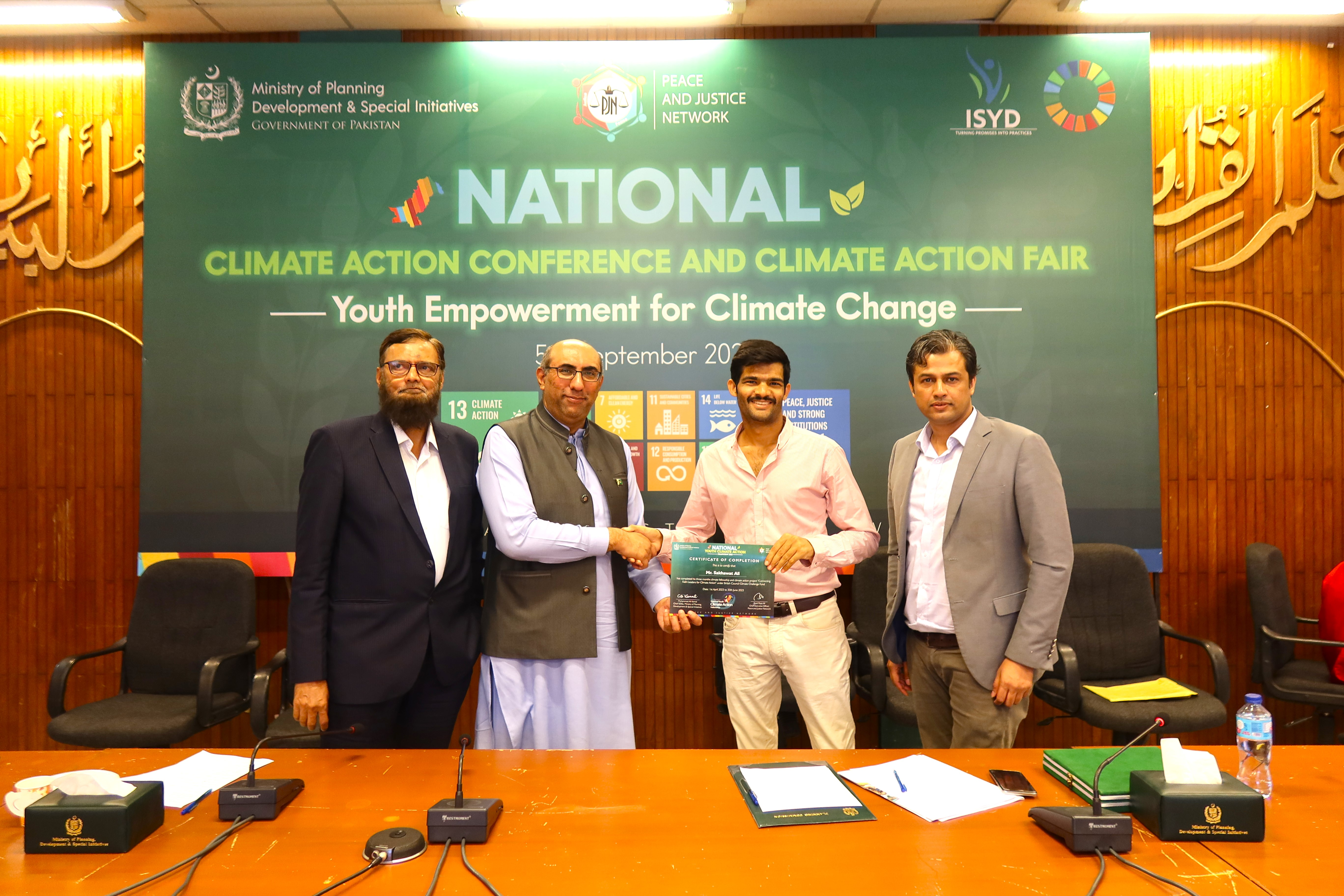
Sakhawat Ali - A Formanite received Best Green-Tech Award at 1st Climate Action Conference at Ministry of Planning from Chief SDGs Unit Mr. Ali Kemal

=== Industry ===
- HMS Choudri, Co-Founder of Batala Engineering Company
- Ahmad Saeed, CEO of Servis Industries
- Swaraj Paul, founder and CEO of Caparo Group
- Anwar Pervez, Co-founder & Chairman, United Bank Limited.

=== Journalism ===
- Mushtaq Minhas, Provincial Minister for Information and Communication AJK Assembly, anchor of Bolta Pakistan on Geo TV
- Kuldip Nayar, Indian author and journalist

=== Literature and arts ===
- "Agyeya" (real name Sachchidananda Hirananda Vatsyayan), modernist Hindi author and journalist
- Anwar Kamal Pasha, pioneer Pakistani film director and producer.
- Krishan Chander, short story writer
- Mehr Lal Soni Zia Fatehabadi, Urdu poet
- Yawar Hayat Khan, senior producer/director of Pakistan Television Corporation
- Balwant Gargi, Punjabi playwright and author
- Harcharan Singh, Punjabi playwright and dramatist
- Shae Gill, singer
- Ali Raza, actor

=== Armed forces ===
- Air Commodore Sajad Haider, 1965 War figure
- Michael John O'Brian, O'Brian was the first Pakistan Air Force officer to serve as the commandant of the National Defence University, Islamabad.
- Noel Israel Khokhar, General Officer Commanding 23rd Division and Major General of Pakistan Army
- Pervez Musharraf, former president of Pakistan, and former chief of Army Staff of Pakistan Army

== Sports ==
FCCU offers a variety of intramural sports clubs, including basketball, cricket, football, hockey, lawn tennis, swimming, table tennis, and wrestling. Both men and women actively take part in these sports on campus.

The sports facilities at FCCU are impressive, with an 8-lane standard 400 m (1,300 ft) grass track for running, a 25 m (82 ft) swimming pool for shorter races, six tennis courts, basketball courts, badminton courts, and dedicated grounds for cricket, football, hockey, and handball. There's also a table tennis hall for enthusiasts to enjoy their games.
