= Muhammad Ishtiaq Urmar =

Pakistani politician

Muhammad Ishtiaq

Provincial Minister of Khyber Pakhtunkhwa for Environment, Forest and Wildlife
- In office 30 August 2018 – 18 January 2023
- Chief Minister: Mahmood Khan

Member of the Khyber Pakhtunkhwa Assembly
- In office 13 August 2018 – 18 January 2023
- Constituency: PK-69 (Peshawar-IV)
- In office 31 May 2013 – 28 May 2018
- Constituency: PK-11 (Peshawar-XI)

Personal details
- Born: Swat District, Khyber Pakhtunkhwa, Pakistan
- Party: PTI-P (2023-present)
- Other political affiliations: PTI (1997-2023)
- Occupation: Politician

Syed Muhammad Ishtiaq Urmar is a Pakistani politician from Peshawar who was a member of the Provincial Assembly of Khyber Pakhtunkhwa from May 2013 to May 2018 and from August 2018 to January 2023.

== Political career ==
He contested the 1997 North-West Frontier Province provincial election as a candidate of the Pakistan Tehreek-e-Insaf (PTI) from PF-7 Peshawar-VII, but was unsuccessful. He received 2,797 votes and was defeated by Hidayatullah Chamkani, a candidate of the Awami National Party (ANP).

Ishtiaq was elected as the member of the Provincial Assembly of Khyber Pakhtunkhwa as a candidate of the PTI from PK-11 (Peshawar-XI) in the 2013 Pakistani general election. He received 15,153 votes and defeated Khalid Waqar, a candidate of the Jamiat Ulema-e-Islam (F) (JUI(F)).

He was re-elected to the Provincial Assembly as a candidate of the PTI from PK-69 Peshawar-IV in the 2018 Khyber Pakhtunkhwa provincial election. He received 17,652 votes and defeated Arbab Muhammad Usman Khan, an independent candidate.

On 17 July 2023, he left the PTI and joined the Pakistan Tehreek-e-Insaf Parliamentarians (PTI(P).
