= Hamid Ul Haq =

Pakistani politician

Hamid ul Haq
- حامدالحق

Member of the National Assembly of Pakistan
- In office 1 June 2013 – 31 May 2018
- Constituency: NA-2 (Peshawar-II)

Personal details
- Born: 1 March 1964 (age 62) Peshawar, Khyber Pakhtunkhwa, Pakistan
- Party: PTI (2002-present)

Hamid ul Haq (Urdu: حامدالحق; born 1 March 1964) is a Pakistani politician who was a member of the National Assembly of Pakistan, from June 2013 to May 2018.

== Early life and education ==
Haq was born on 1 August 1964.

He holds a degree of Bachelor of Science in civil engineering from the University of Engineering and Technology, Peshawar which he received in 1988.

== Political career ==
Haq ran for the seat of Provincial Assembly of Khyber Pakhtunkhwa as a candidate of Pakistan Tehreek-e-Insaf (PTI) from Constituency PK-05 (Peshawar-V) in the 2002 general elections but was unsuccessful. He received 1,443 votes and lost the seat to a candidate of Muttahida Majlis-e-Amal.

He was elected to the National Assembly of Pakistan from NA-2 (Peshawar-II) as a candidate of PTI in the 2013 general elections. He received 79,125 votes and defeated a candidate of Jamiat Ulema-e Islam (F).
