= Babar Yaqoob Fateh Muhammad =

Pakistani civil servant

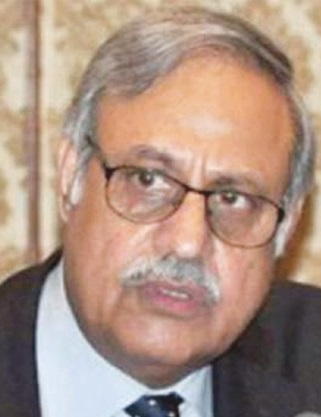

Personal details
- Born: 13 August 1954 (age 72) Islamic Republic of Pakistan
- Education: Birmingham University; Punjab University
- Occupation: Civil servant

Babar Yaqoob Fateh Muhammad (born 13 August 1954) is a retired Pakistani civil servant who served as chairman of the Federal Land Commission of Pakistan from April 2020 to April 2023. Previously, he served in BPS-22 grade as the Cabinet Secretary of Pakistan, Chief Secretary Balochistan and Maritime Secretary (in acting capacity). He also served as ECP Secretary and Chief Secretary Gilgit Baltistan. He belongs to the Pakistan Administrative Service and is batchmates with Shehzad Arbab, Tariq Bajwa and Sajjad Saleem Hotiana.

== Career ==
Babar Yaqoob served as chairman of the Federal Land Commission of Pakistan from April 2020 to April 2023. Previously, he served as Cabinet Secretary of Pakistan under Prime Minister Nawaz Sharif and as Chief Secretary Balochistan from 2012 to 2014.

He also held the office of Maritime Secretary of Pakistan in an acting capacity. Earlier, he served as Chief Secretary Gilgit Baltistan. He also remained as District Coordination Officer Kasur.

During the 2018 general elections, he served as the ECP Secretary. Babar is known for his upright and solid reputation.

== See also ==
- Government of Pakistan
- Pakistan Administrative Service
