= Arbab Jehangir Khan =

Pakistani politician

- ارباب جہانگیر خان

8th Chief Minister of the North-West Frontier Province
- In office 7 April 1985 – 29 May 1988
- Governor: Fazle Haq; Nawabzada Abdul Ghafoor Khan Hoti; Syed Usman Ali Shah
- Preceded by: Iqbal Khan Jadoon
- Succeeded by: Fazle Haq

Personal details
- Born: 1 August 1936 Peshawar, North-West Frontier Province, British India (present-day Khyber Pakhtunkhwa, Pakistan)
- Died: 16 October 2007 (aged 71) Peshawar, Khyber Pakhtunkhwa, Pakistan
- Education: University of Peshawar

Arbab Jehangir Khan Khalil (1 August 1936 – 16 October 2007) a renowned figure of the Khalil tribe, was a Pakistani politician hailed from Khyber-Pakhtunkhwa, Pakistan. He served as the 8th elected (14th overall) Chief Minister from 7 April 1985 to 29 May 1988 and then as the Leader of opposition in the Khyber-Pakhtunkhwa assembly from 1989 to 1990. Electorally undefeated throughout his career, he also served as Federal Minister for Petroleum Resources, Housing and Works, Narcotics control and Senior Minister.

== Early life and education ==
Arbab Jehangir Khan was born in 1936 to Nawab Arbab Sher Ali Khan in Tehkal Peshawar.

He got a degree in law from the University of Peshawar.

== Personal life ==
His daughter-in-law, Asma Arbab Alamgir, is a Pakistani politician who served as member of the National Assembly of Pakistan.

His son Arbab Alamgir Khan was appointed Federal Minister for Communications in the cabinet of Prime Minister Yousaf Raza Gillani.

His nephew Shehzad Arbab was a bureaucrat who ended his career as Chief Secretary Khyber Pakhtunkhwa and Azad Jammu Kashmir. He later joined Pakistan Tehreek-e-Insaf and was appointed Special Assistant to Prime Minister Imran Khan. Arbab Jehangir Khan's elder brother was Commissioner Dera Ismail Khan.

He was the sixth of seven brothers, three of whom served in Pakistan Army one of them being Arbab Niaz Muhammad who was later appointed a Minister and the cricket stadium in peshawar is named after him.

== Political career ==
Arbab Jehangir Khan started his political career in 1969. In 1970, he contested election for the first time and was elected to Provincial Assembly from National Awami Party.

In the 1977 general elections He secured his seat by winning the provincial assembly seat from Pakistan People Party and in 1985 elections he was sworn in as the 8th Chief Minister of North-West-Frontier-Province now Khyber Pakhtunkhwa.

In 1988 he ran for the Provincial Assembly seat as an independent candidate continuing his winning streak.

From 1990 and onwards he shifted his focus towards National politics securing the 1990, 1993 and 1997 National Assembly seat. A lawyer by profession, he earned the distinction of being electorally undefeated in every election he contested in his 32-year political career.

Due to health issues, he retired from politics prior to the 2002 general elections. He held senior positions in all Pakistan's major political parties including Pakistan Muslim League, Awami National Party and Pakistan People's Party.

== Death ==
Arabab Jehangir Khan died due to cardiac arrest on Tuesday, 16 October 2007 at the age of 71. Thousands gathered to offer his funeral in University of Peshawar. He was laid to rest in his family graveyard in Tehkal area of Peshawar.

== See also ==
- List of chief ministers of Khyber Pakhtunkhwa
- Khyber Pakhtunkhwa

Political offices
Preceded by Iqbal Khan Jadoon	Chief Minister of Khyber-Pakhtunkhwa; 1985–1988	Succeeded by Fazle Haq (Caretaker)
