= Sajjad Saleem Hotiana =

Pakistani civil servant

Chief Secretary Sindh
- In office November 2013 – March 2015
- Appointed by: Nawaz Sharif
- Preceded by: Muhammad Ijaz Chaudhry
- Succeeded by: Muhammad Siddique Memon

Personal details
- Born: 14 March 1955 (age 71) Hota, Pakpattan, Punjab, Pakistan
- Education: Forman Christian College; Government College Lahore (M.A.); University of Karachi (LLB); Marshall School of Business (MPA); University of Toronto (LLM)
- Occupation: Civil servant, Pakistan Administrative Service

Sajjad Saleem Hotiana (Urdu: سجاد سلیم ہوتیانہ) (born 14 March 1955) is a retired Pakistani civil servant who served in BPS-22 grade as Chief Secretary Sindh. Hotiana also served as Chief Secretary Gilgit Baltistan and Senior Member Federal Land Commission. After retirement from active civil service, he tenured as Member of Punjab Public Service Commission (PPSC). He is civil service batchmates with Babar Yaqoob Fateh Muhammad, Shehzad Arbab and Tariq Bajwa.

== Early life and education ==
Sajjad Saleem was born in Hota, Pakpattan. He studied at St Mary's Convent High School Montgomery in Sahiwal from 1963 to 1969. He attended Forman Christian College from 1972 to 1976 and got a bachelor's degree in literature and political science. After obtaining bachelor's degree, Sajjad joined Government College University, Lahore in 1976 from where he got a master's degree in English language, literature and letters.

After joining the civil service, he was admitted to University of Karachi and did Bachelor of Laws in 1986. In 1987, he joined Marshall School of Business, University of Southern California and graduated with a master's degree in public administration (MPA) in 1989. Later, he attended John F. Kennedy School of Government, Harvard University for executive leadership development program in 2005. In 2007, he did Master of Laws with specialization in financial laws from University of Toronto.

== Career in civil service ==
Sajjad Saleem Hotiana topped the CSS exam and joined District Management Group (now Pakistan Administrative Service) in 1980. He belongs to 9th Common Training Program (CTP) of Central Superior Services. He secured full marks in CSS viva voce, a record which can only be matched and cannot be beaten.

After completion of training at Civil Services Academy, Lahore, he was posted in Sindh as assistant commissioner in 1982 where he served till 1986. He served as assistant commissioner in Tharparkar, Sukkur, and Karachi. In 1986, his services were transferred to federal government of Pakistan and he was posted as principal staff officer to federal minister for finance. He served in this position till 1989. He served as consul general commercial and head of Pakistan trade mission on South America from 1991 to 1994. In 1998, he was posted as deputy managing director in Punjab Small Industries Corporation. In BS-20, he served as District Coordination Officer D.C.O Chawal from 2003 to 2004 and secretary Environment Protection Department, Punjab from March 2009 to March 2012. In May 2012, he was elevated as chief secretary Gilgit Baltistan where he served till May 2013.

He was appointed as Chief Secretary Sindh, replacing Muhammad Ejaz Chaudhry, in November 2013 by Prime Minister Nawaz Sharif. He served as CS Sindh till March 2015.

His other career appointments include additional deputy commissioner Bahawalpur, deputy commissioner Multan, deputy commissioner Muzaffargarh, chairman of board of directors of Karakoram Bank, chairman of Board of Directors Northern Areas Transport Corporation (NATCO), federal secretary ministry of industries and production, managing director Printing Corporation of Pakistan, and head of department / senior member Federal Land Commission of Pakistan. He retired from civil service in 2015.

== Punjab Public Service Commission ==
He was appointed acting chairman of Punjab Public Service Commission on 25 January 2021.
