= Arif Yousaf =

Pakistani politician

MPA Arif Yousaf

Special Assistants in Law Department to Chief Minister
- In office 4 October 2013 – 28 May 2018

Member of the Khyber Pakhtunkhwa Assembly
- In office 29 May 2013 – 28 May 2018
- Constituency: PK-04 (Peshawar-IV)

Personal details
- Party: PTI (2013-present)
- Occupation: Politician

Arif Yousaf (Pashto: عارف يوسف) is a Pakistani politician hailing from Peshawar, who served as a member in the 10th Khyber Pakhtunkhwa Assembly, belonging to the Pakistan Tehreek-e-Insaf.

== Political career ==
Yousaf was elected as the member of the Khyber Pakhtunkhwa Assembly on ticket of Pakistan Tehreek-e-Insaf from PK-04 (Peshawar-IV) in the 2013 Pakistani general election.
