= Rehmatullah Khalil =

Pakistani politician

Maulana Rehmatullah Khalil MNA

Member of the National Assembly of Pakistan
- In office 2002–2007
- Constituency: NA-2 (Peshawar-II)

Personal details
- Party: Muttahida Majlis-e-Amal (MMA)
- Occupation: Politician

Maulana Rehmatullah Khalil was a Pakistani politician who served as members of the 12th National Assembly of Pakistan from 16 November 2002 -02-10-2007.
