= Asma Arbab Alamgir =

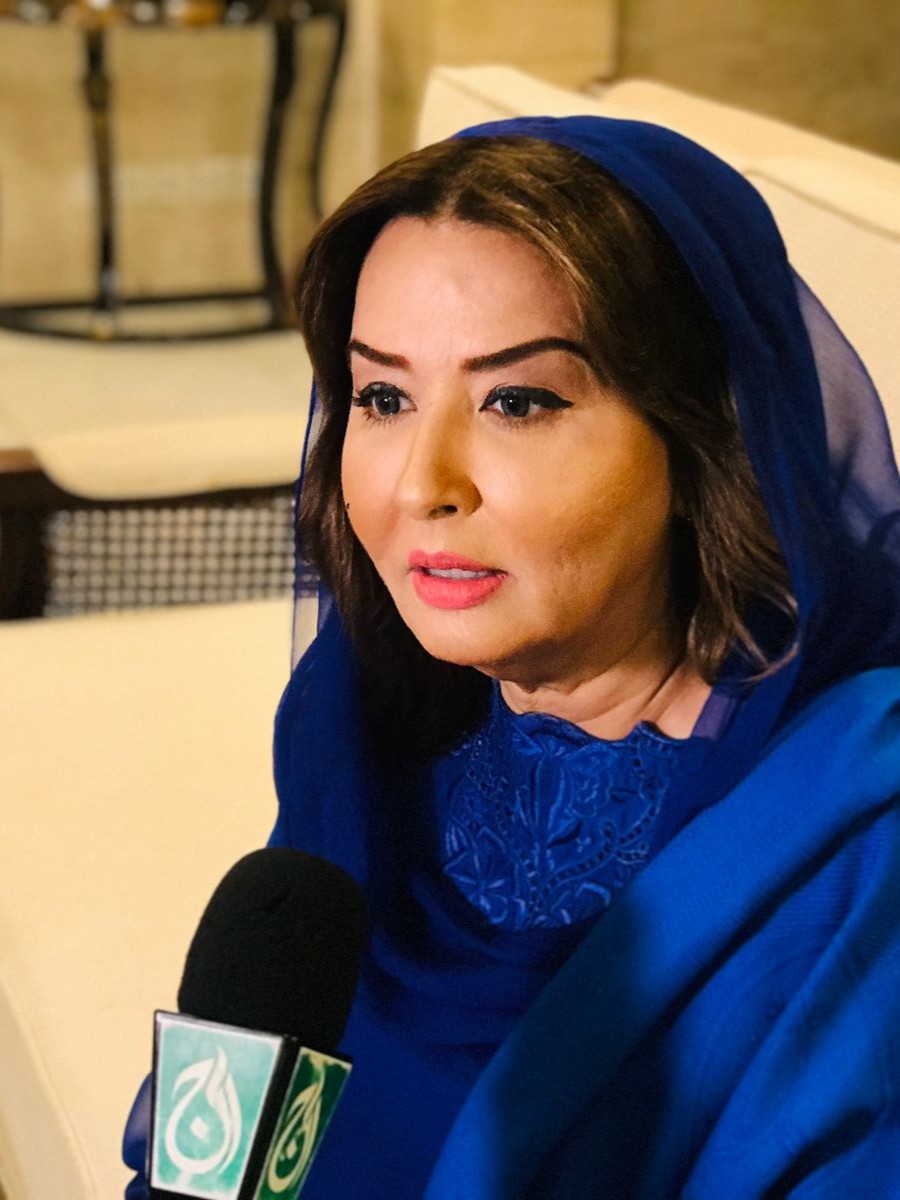

Member of the National Assembly of Pakistan
- In office 2008–2013
- Constituency: Reserved seat for women (Khyber Pakhtunkhwa)

Advisor to the Ministry of States and Frontier Regions (SAFRON)
- In office April 2010 – March 2013

Member of the National Assembly of Pakistan
- Incumbent
- Assumed office 29 February 2024
- Constituency: Reserved seat for women (Khyber Pakhtunkhwa)

Personal details
- Born: 9 July 1965 (age 60) Peshawar, Pakistan
- Party: Pakistan Peoples Party (PPP)
- Spouse: Arbab Alamgir Khan
- Children: 3 (including Arbab Zarak Khan)
- Education: Graduation in Law and Economics
- Alma mater: University of Peshawar

Asma Arbab Alamgir (عاصمہ ارباب عالمگیر; born 9 July 1965) is a Pakistani politician who has been a member of the National Assembly of Pakistan since February 2024. She previously served as a member of the National Assembly from 2008 to 2013 and held the position of Advisor to the Federal Ministry of States and Frontier Regions (SAFRON).

A prominent figure in Khyber Pakhtunkhwa politics, she is a leader within the Pakistan Peoples Party (PPP).

== Early life and education ==
Asma Alamgir was born on 9 July 1965 into the influential Jhagra family of Khyber Pakhtunkhwa. She completed her graduation in Law and Economics.

She is married to Arbab Alamgir Khan, a scion of the powerful Arbab political family from Peshawar. Her father-in-law, Arbab Jehangir Khan, served as the Chief Minister of Khyber Pakhtunkhwa. The couple has three sons, including Arbab Zarak Khan.

== Political career ==
=== 2008–2013: First tenure and cabinet role ===
Asma Alamgir began her parliamentary career in the 2008 Pakistani general election, where she was elected to the National Assembly of Pakistan on a reserved seat for women from Khyber Pakhtunkhwa as a candidate of the Pakistan Peoples Party (PPP).

During her tenure, she held significant portfolios within the party and the federal government:

- Advisor to the Ministry of SAFRON: In April 2010, she was appointed as the Advisor to the Federal Minister for States and Frontier Regions. In this capacity, she worked on policy matters regarding the tribal areas and frontier regions during a critical period of counter-terrorism operations.
- PPP Women Wing: In February 2010, she was appointed as the President of the PPP Women Wing, tasked with mobilizing female voters and addressing women's issues within the party platform. She also served as the provincial coordinator for the party in Khyber Pakhtunkhwa.

=== 2013–2023: Opposition and party work ===
In the 2018 Pakistani general election, she contested for the National Assembly seat NA-27 (Peshawar-I) but was unsuccessful. She secured 24,002 votes, losing to Noor Alam Khan of the Pakistan Tehreek-e-Insaf (PTI).

In November 2023, reports surfaced regarding internal disagreements within the party. While her husband, Arbab Alamgir Khan, announced his resignation from the PPP on 18 November 2023 citing dissatisfaction with the central leadership's neglect of the Khyber Pakhtunkhwa chapter, Asma Alamgir maintained her affiliation with the party. She resigned from her party office as Central Deputy Information Secretary but did not leave the PPP itself.

=== 2024–present: Return to Assembly ===
She remained with the PPP and returned to the parliamentary fold in the 2024 Pakistani general election. She was elected to a reserved seat for women and took oath as a member of the National Assembly on 15 March 2024.

On 13 May 2024, the Election Commission of Pakistan (ECP) briefly suspended her membership following a Supreme Court of Pakistan ruling regarding the allocation of reserved seats to the Sunni Ittehad Council (SIC) bloc. However, she remains an active member of the assembly representing the PPP.

== Controversies ==
=== Assets Beyond Means case ===
In 2017, the National Accountability Bureau (NAB) filed a reference against Asma Alamgir and her husband, Arbab Alamgir Khan, accusing them of accumulating assets disproportionate to their known sources of income. The reference alleged that the couple possessed assets worth approximately PKR 332 million, including properties in Islamabad, Peshawar, and foreign assets in the United Arab Emirates and the United Kingdom.

Both Asma and her husband strongly denied the charges, terming the case as political victimization. They were indicted by an accountability court in January 2019 but maintained their innocence throughout the trial, arguing that their assets were ancestral and duly declared.

== Personal life ==
Asma Arbab Alamgir resides in Peshawar with her family. She is the wife of Dr. Arbab Alamgir Khan, who served as the Federal Minister for Communications from 2008 to 2013.

In July 2025, her father passed away. His death was widely mourned in political circles, with condolences offered by state dignitaries including President Asif Ali Zardari and Senate Chairman Yousaf Raza Gillani.
