= International Congress of Genetics =

The International Congress of Genetics (ICG) is a five yearly conference for geneticists. The first ICG was held in 1898. Since 1973, it has been organized by the International Genetics Federation (IGF). The aim of the congress is to reflect on progress made in genetics, to celebrate the best of contemporary research and to anticipate future developments in the discipline. It is one of the most important genetics meetings, presenting all subfields of the discipline. These subfields cover all present-day experiments using the powerful genomic technologies. Also, the benefits and wider implications of genetic research to societies at large are explored.

The Congress has been held in many major cities around the world, such as London, New York City, Paris, Ithaca, Edinburgh, Stockholm, Bellagio, Montreal, The Hague, Tokyo, Berkeley, Moscow, New Delhi, Toronto, Birmingham, Beijing, Melbourne, Berlin and Singapore.

The last International Congress of Genetics took place in Melbourne in 2023. In 2028, the 24th International Congress of Genetics will be held in Cape Town, South Africa.

The International Genetics Federation (IGF) is an association of national genetics societies interested in promoting the advancement of the science of genetics. The IGF is governed by a representative council that meets every five years at the International Congress of Genetics (ICG) to choose the venue of the next Congress, to elect IGF officers and members of the Executive Board, and to set dues, make or affirm policy decisions, and amend the IGF Constitution as needed.

== Meeting history ==
- 2023 - Melbourne, Australia (XXIII)
- 2018 - Foz do Iguaçu, Brazil (XXII)
- 2013 - Singapore (XXI)
- 2008 - Berlin, Germany (XX)
- 2003 - Melbourne, Australia (XIX)
- 1998 - Beijing, China (XVIII)
- 1993 - Birmingham, UK (XVII)
- 1988 - Toronto, Canada (XVI)
- 1983 - New Delhi, India (XV)
- 1978 - Moscow, USSR (XIV)
- 1973 - Berkeley, USA(XIII)
- 1968 - Tokyo, Japan (XII)
- 1963 - The Hague, The Netherlands (XI)
- 1958 - Montreal, Canada (X)
- 1953 - Bellagio, Italy (IX)
- 1948 - Stockholm, Sweden (VIII)
- 1939 - Edinburgh, Scotland (VII)
- 1932 - Ithaca, USA (VI)
- 1927 - Berlin, Germany (V)
- 1911 - Paris, France (IV)
- 1906 - London, England (III)
- 1902 - New York, USA (II)
- 1899 - London, England (I)
