= Shehzad Arbab =

Pakistani civil servant

Muhammad Shehzad Arbab
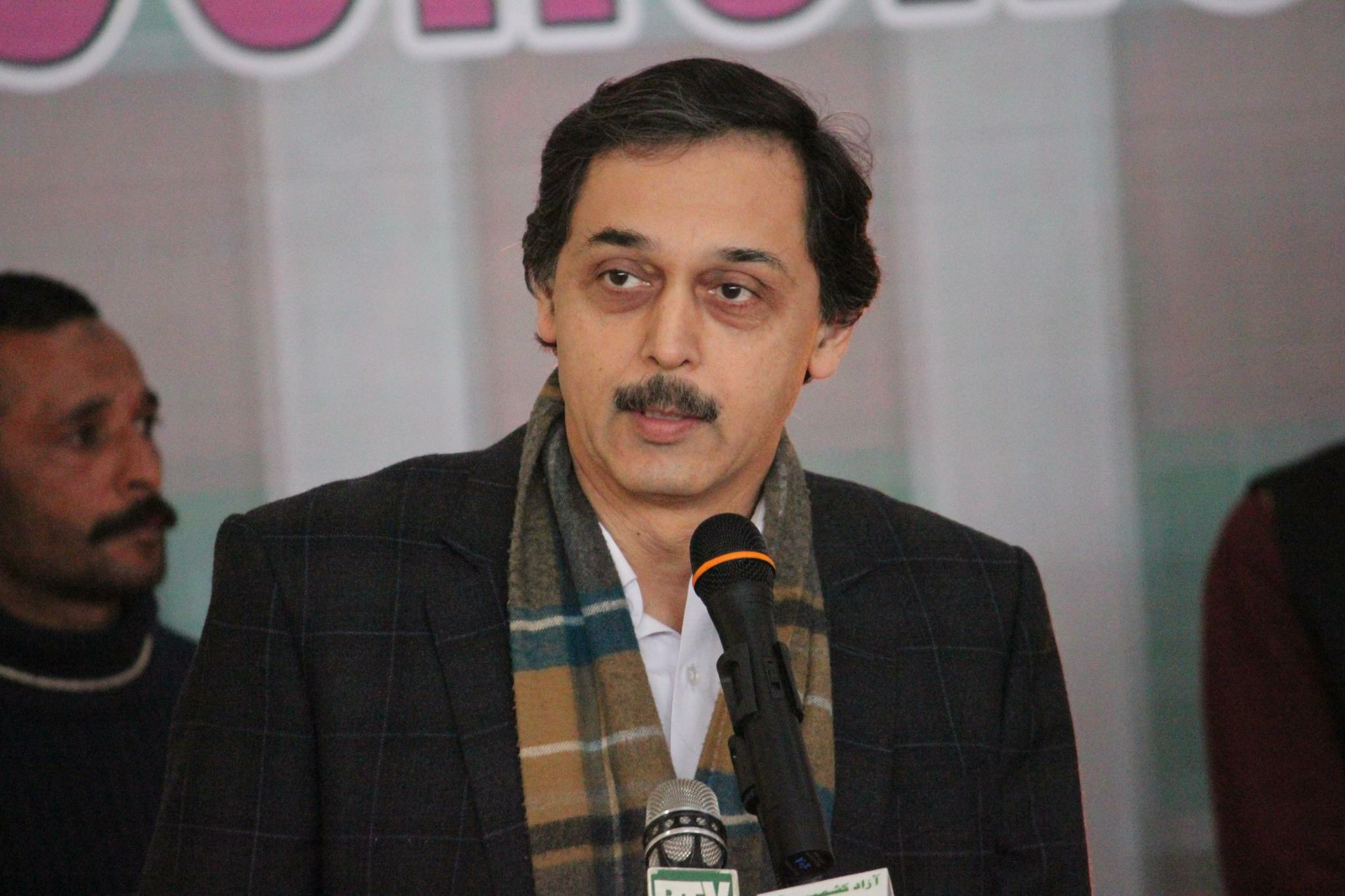

Special Assistant to Prime Minister on Establishment
- In office 11 April 2020 – 10 April 2022
- President: Arif Alvi
- Prime Minister: Imran Khan
- Preceded by: Himself, as an advisor

Advisor to the Prime Minister on Establishment
- In office 20 August 2018 – 6 April 2020
- President: Arif Alvi
- Prime Minister: Imran Khan
- Succeeded by: Himself, as special assistant

Secretary for States & Frontier Regions
- In office March 2016 – March 2017
- President: Mamnoon Hussain
- Prime Minister: Nawaz Sharif

Commerce Secretary of Pakistan
- In office February 2014 – March 2016
- President: Mamnoon Hussain
- Prime Minister: Nawaz Sharif

Chief Secretary Khyber Pakhtunkhwa
- In office June 2013 – February 2014
- Appointed by: Nawaz Sharif
- Governor: Shaukatullah Khan
- Chief Minister: Pervez Khattak

Personal details
- Occupation: Career Bureaucrat

Muhammad Shehzad Arbab is a retired Pakistani civil servant who served as Advisor to Prime Minister Imran Khan on Establishment from August 2018 to 10 April 2022. Before his retirement from civil services, Arbab served in BPS-22 grade as the Commerce Secretary of Pakistan and Chief Secretary Khyber Pakhtunkhwa. He belongs to the Pakistan Administrative Service and is batchmates with Tariq Bajwa, Babar Yaqoob Fateh Muhammad and Sajjad Saleem Hotiana.

A member of the eminent Arbab family of the Khyber Pakhtunkhwa province, Shehzad Arbab is known for having played a key role in the FATA reforms of 2017 during his tenure as Federal Secretary SAFRON. He has previously also served as Chief Secretary Azad Kashmir and Additional Secretary at Aiwan-e-Sadr.

== Personal life ==
Arbab is son of Arbab Niaz Muhammad, former Pakistan Army officer who served as a member of President Zia-ul-Haq's cabinet in the capacity as Minister for Culture. The international cricket stadium in Peshawar, Arbab Niaz Stadium, is named after Arbab Niaz.
