= Chief Secretary of Khyber Pakhtunkhwa =

High-ranking bureaucrat of Khyber Pakhtunkhwa province in Pakistan

Chief Secretary Khyber Pakhtunkhwa
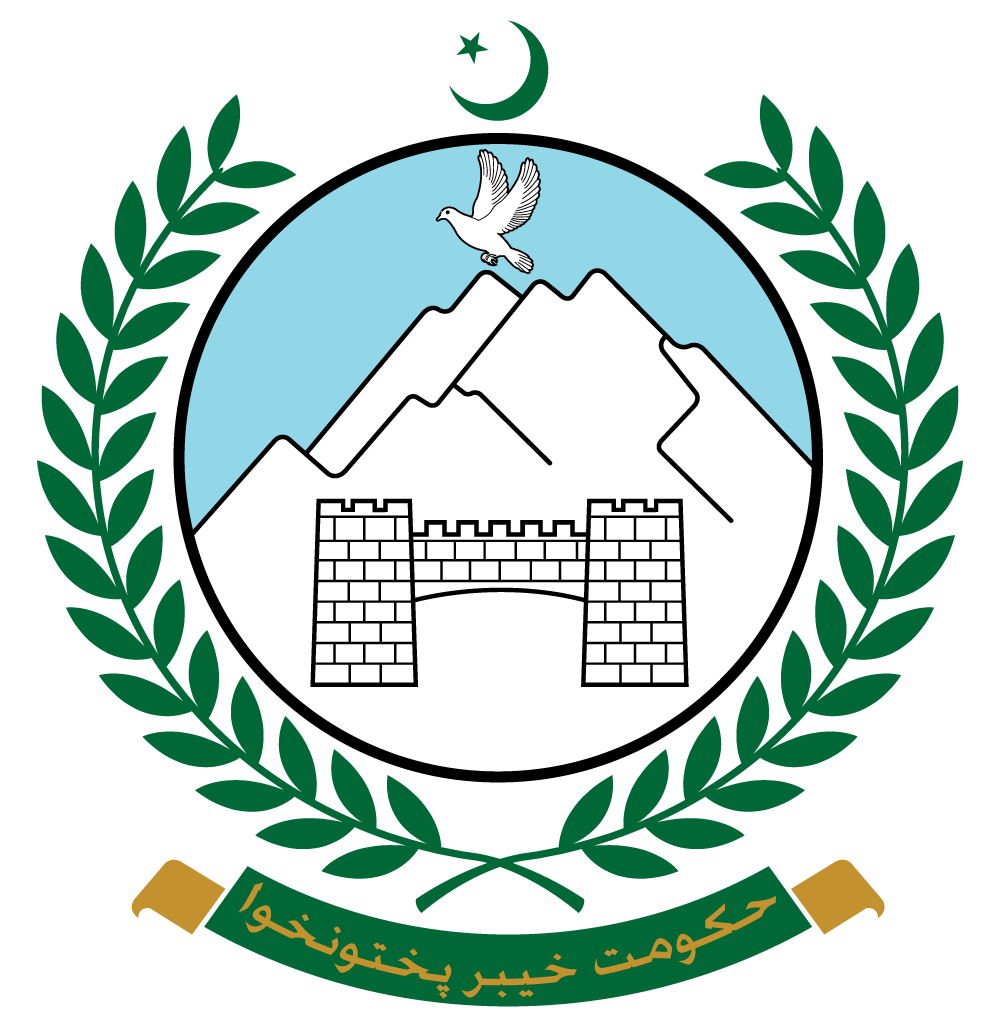
- Incumbent; Dr Fakhar-e-Alam Irfan since 11 October 2026
- Reports to: Chief Minister of Khyber Pakhtunkhwa
- Seat: Civil Secretariat, Peshawar
- Appointer: Prime Minister of Pakistan
- Website: Government of Khyber Pakhtunkhwa

The chief secretary of Khyber Pakhtunkhwa (Urdu: مُعْتَمَدِ اعلٰی خیبر پختونخوا), also referred to as CS KP, is the bureaucratic chief and highest-ranking official of the Government of Khyber Pakhtunkhwa. The appointment of the chief secretary is made directly by the prime minister of Pakistan. The position of chief secretary is equivalent to the rank of federal secretary and the position holder usually belongs to the Pakistan Administrative Service.

The chief secretary is the province's administrative boss as all administrative secretaries report to him. The CS in turn reports to the chief minister, however the chief secretary is not under the charge of the chief minister as only the prime minister can appoint or remove the CS from his position. The chief secretary also serves as the chief advisor to the chief minister and as secretary to the provincial Cabinet.

== List of chief secretaries ==
The following table lists the names of chief secretaries who have remained in office since March 1997.

1	Rustam Shah Mohmand	March 1997	August 1998
2	Saeedullah Jan	August 1998	October 1999
3	Abdullah	October 1999	February 2001
4	Maj(R)Naeem Khan	February 2001	December 2001
5	Shakil Durrani	December 2001	June 2003
6	Ejaz Qureshi	June 2003	March 2007
7	Sahibzada Riaz Noor	March 2007	March 2009
8	Javed Iqbal	March 2009	October 2010
9	Ghulam Dastagir	October 2010	June 2013
10	Mohammad Shahzad Arbab	June 2013	February 2014
11	Amjad Ali Khan	April 2014	October 2016
12	Abid Saeed	October 2016	August 2017
13	Muhammad Azam Khan	September 2017	June 2018
14	Naveed Kamran Baloch	June 2018	February 2019
15	Muhammad Salim	February 2019	October 2019
16	Dr. Kazim Niaz	October 2019	November 2021
17	Dr. Shahzad Khan Bangash	November 2021	February 2023
18	Imdad Ullah Bosal	February 2023	March 2023
19	Nadeem Aslam Chaudhry	March 2023	February 2025
20	Shahab Ali Shah	February 2025	October 2026
21	Dr Fakhar-e-Alam Irfan	October 2026	

== See also ==
- Federal Secretary
- Pakistan Administrative Service
- Establishment Secretary of Pakistan
- Cabinet Secretary of Pakistan
- Chief Secretary Sindh
- Chief Secretary Balochistan
- Chief Secretary Punjab
- Chief Secretary (Pakistan)
