= Sher Ali Arbab =

Pakistani politician

Member of the National Assembly of Pakistan
- Incumbent
- Assumed office 29 February 2024
- Constituency: NA-31 Peshawar-IV
- In office 13 August 2018 – 20 January 2023
- Constituency: NA-30 (Peshawar-IV)

Personal details
- Born: 28 July 1978 (age 47) Peshawar, Khyber Pakhtunkhwa, Pakistan
- Party: PTI (2018-present)

Sher Ali Arbab is a Pakistani politician who has been a member of the National Assembly of Pakistan since February 2024. He previously served as a member from August 2018 to till 20 January 2023.

== Political career ==
He was elected to the National Assembly of Pakistan as a candidate of Pakistan Tehreek-e-Insaf (PTI) from Constituency NA-30 (Peshawar-IV) in the 2018 Pakistani general election. He received 73,781 votes and defeated Arbab Najeeb Ullah Khan, a candidate of Muttahida Majlis-e-Amal (MMA).
