= Mohammad Anees Qureshi =

Pakistani politician

Muhammad Anis Qureshi
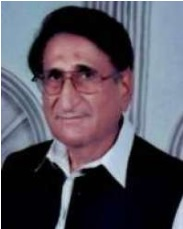
- Muhammad Anis Qureshi

Member of the Provincial Assembly of the Punjab
- In office 29 May 2013 – 31 May 2018

Personal details
- Born: 10 March 1946 (age 80) Kasur
- Party: Pakistan Muslim League (Nawaz)

Muhammad Anis Qureshi is a Pakistani politician who was a Member of the Provincial Assembly of the Punjab, from May 2013 to May 2018.

== Early life and education ==
Mr Muhammad Anis Qureshi son of Mr Muhammad Yasin was born on March 10, 1946, in Kasur.

He has a degree of Master of Arts in English which he obtained from Government College, Lahore in 1967 and a degree of Master in Development Administration which he received in 1990 from University of Birmingham. He graduated in Law in 2005 from Bahauddin Zakariya University and has a degree of Bachelor of Laws.

== Career as a Civil Servant ==
He joined the Civil Service after qualifying the Punjab provincial competitive civil service examination and served as Deputy Commissioner and DCO Khusab district during 1992-93 and 2005 respectively; as Deputy Commissioner Narowal district during 1999-2001; as DCO, Mandi Bahauddin district during 2001-03; as DCO Muzaffargarh during 2004; as DCO (BPS20) Layyah during 2004-05; and retired in 2006 while serving on the Member Board of Revenue Punjab. He was also sent for higher studies by the Government of Punjab on a British Council Scholarship in 1989 for one year.

== Foreign Visits ==
He has visited UK, Canada, USA and Saudi Arabia in different capacities.

== Political career ==
He was elected to the Provincial Assembly of the Punjab as a candidate of Pakistan Muslim League (Nawaz) from Constituency PP-176 (Kasur-II) in the 2013 Pakistani general election.
