= Wajid Ullah Khan =

Pakistani politician

Member of the Provincial Assembly of Khyber Pakhtunkhwa
- In office 13 August 2018 – 18 January 2023
- Constituency: PK-75 (Peshawar-X)

Personal details
- Party: PTI-P (2023-present)
- Other political affiliations: PTI (2018-2023)

Wajid Ullah Khan is a Pakistani politician who had been a member of the Provincial Assembly of Khyber Pakhtunkhwa from August 2018 till January 2023.

== Political career ==
He was elected to the Provincial Assembly of Khyber Pakhtunkhwa as a candidate of Pakistan Tehreek-e-Insaf from Constituency PK-75 (Peshawar-X) in the 2018 Pakistani general election.
