= Arbab Muhammad Usman Khan =

Pakistani politician

Member of the Provincial Assembly of Khyber Pakhtunkhwa
- Incumbent
- Assumed office 29 February 2024
- Constituency: PK-75 Peshawar-IV

Personal details
- Born: Peshawar District, Khyber Pakhtunkhwa, Pakistan
- Party: ANP (2024-present)

Arbab Muhammad Usman Khan is a Pakistani politician from Peshawar District. He is currently serving as member of the Provincial Assembly of Khyber Pakhtunkhwa since February 2024.

== Career ==
He contested the 2024 general elections as a Awami National Party candidate from PK-75 Peshawar-IV. He secured 44564 votes while the runner-up was Malik Shahab Hussain of Pakistan Tehreek-e-Insaf/Independent who secured 26126 votes.
