= Chief Secretary of Punjab (Pakistan) =

Bureaucratic chief of the Pakistani province of Punjab

- مُعْتَمَدِ اعلٰی پنجاب; Muʿtamad-ē-Aʿlā Panjāb
- Emblem of Punjab

- Flag of Punjab
- Incumbent; Zahid Akhtar Zaman since 24 January 2023
- Administrative branch of the Government of Punjab
- Style: Officer
- Type: Chief bureaucratic officer
- Abbreviation: CS
- Member of: Cabinet of Punjab (as secretary)
- Reports to: Chief Minister of Punjab
- Residence: Punjab Civil Secretariat
- Seat: Lahore
- Nominator: Establishment Division
- Appointer: Prime Minister of Pakistan
- Term length: *At the pleasure of the federal government; No term limits specified
- Precursor: Secretary to the Government of British Punjab
- Inaugural holder: Akhter Husain
- Formation: 15 August 1947; 79 years ago
- Website: Government of Punjab

The chief secretary of Punjab (Punjabi/Urdu: مُعْتَمَدِ اعلٰی پنجاب, romanized: Muʿtamad-ē-Aʿlā Panjāb) is the bureaucratic chief and highest-ranking administrative official of the Pakistani province of Punjab. Appointed by the Prime Minister of Pakistan in consultation with the government of Punjab, the chief secretary reports to the chief minister of Punjab and is part of their cabinet as a secretary. The position is equivalent to that of the federal secretary, and the officeholder belongs to the Pakistan Administrative Service.

The chief secretary is the province's administrative boss as all the divisional commissioners and administrative secretaries of the province report to him/her. The CS in return reports to the chief minister of Punjab, however the chief secretary is not under the charge of the chief minister as only the prime minister can appoint or remove the CS from his position. The chief secretary also serves as the chief advisor to the chief minister and as secretary to the provincial Cabinet.

== List of chief secretaries ==
The following table lists down the names of chief secretaries that have remained in office since December 2003.

No.	Name of Chief Secretary	Entered office	Left office
1	Kamran Rasool	December 2003	October 2005
2	Salman Siddique	October 2005	March 2008
3	Javed Mehmood	March 2008	February 2009
4	Najibullah Malik	February 2009	April 2009
5	Javed Mehmood	April 2009	February 2010
6	Nasir Mahmood Khosa	February 2010	April 2013
7	Javed Aslam	April 2013	October 2013
8	Naveed Akram Cheema	October 2013	January 2015
9	Khizar Hayat Gondal	January 2015	April 2016
10	Capt (Rtd) Zahid Saeed	April 2016	June 2018
11	Akbar Hussain Durrani	June 2018	October 2018
12	Yousuf Naseem Khokhar	October 2018	November 2019
13	Maj (Rtd) Azam Suleman Khan	November 2019	April 2020
14	Jawad Rafique Malik	April 2020	September 2021
15	Kamran Ali Afzal	September 2021	September 2022
16	Abdullah Khan Sumbal	September 2022	January 2023
17	Zahid Akhtar Zaman	January 2023	Incumbent

== See also ==
- Federal Secretary
- Pakistan Administrative Service
- Establishment Secretary of Pakistan
- Cabinet Secretary of Pakistan
- Chief Secretary Sindh
- Chief Secretary Balochistan
- Chief Secretary Khyber Pakhtunkhwa
- Chief Secretary (Pakistan)
- Deputy commissioner
