= Kauser Abdullah Malik =

Pakistani agricultural scientist

Kausar Abdullah Malik
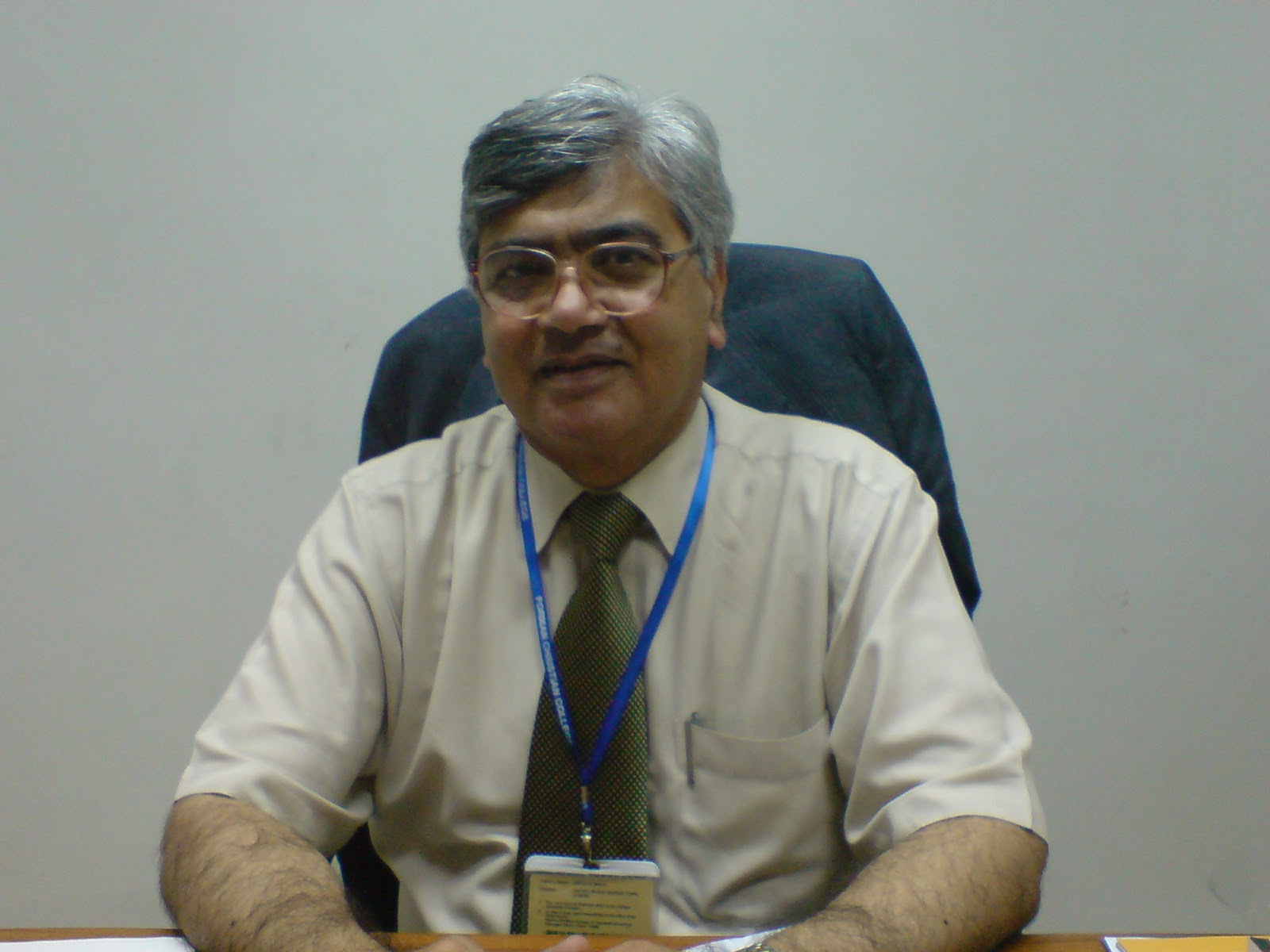
- Born: July 7, 1945 (age 81)
- Education: Aston University (PhD); Government College University, Lahore (BS, MS)
- Awards: Hilal-i-Imtiaz (2004); Sitara-i-Imtiaz (1998); Tamgha-e-Imtiaz (1988); Gold medal by the Pakistan Academy of Sciences (1993); Distinguished National Professor Award (2005)
- Scientific career
- Fields: Agriculture science
- Workplaces: National Institute for Biotechnology and Genetic Engineering; Pakistan Agricultural Research Council; Pakistan Atomic Energy Commission; Planning Commission (Pakistan)

Kausar Abdullah Malik (born 7 July 1945), is a Pakistani agriculture scientist and educationist.

== Early life and education ==
Malik is the eldest son of Urdu language author, journalist and Marxist, Abdullah Malik. Malik attended Forman Christian College in Lahore, Pakistan from 1959–1961 and completed his Higher Secondary School Certificate. His Bachelor of Science and Master of Science are from Government College University, Lahore. He holds his Doctor of Philosophy in microbiology from Aston University, United Kingdom in 1970.

== Scientific career ==
Malik started his research career from the Nuclear Institute for Agriculture and Biology (NIAB), Faisalabad (1971-1992) (Pakistan Atomic Energy Commission). He is the founder Director General of the National Institute for Biotechnology and Genetic Engineering (NIBGE) at Faisalabad where he had been involved from the conceptual stage to its operation and developed all the research programs and scientific manpower.

In view of his research and management experience, Dr Malik was appointed Chairman of the Pakistan Agricultural Research Council (PARC) which is the apex body responsible for coordinating research and development activities related to agriculture in the country (15 September 1998 – 27 February 2001). During his tenure he was able to establish an Agricultural Research Endowment Fund of Rs. 1.2 billion which is being utilized to fund competitive research grants in the country.

During 2001-2006, Malik served as Member (Biosciences & Administration) of the Pakistan Atomic Energy Commission and established Medical Institutes at different places in the country. Subsequently, he was invited to join Planning Commission (Pakistan) as its member looking after Food and Agriculture economic development from 2006-2008. During this period, Dr Malik also acted as the Secretary of the National Commission on Biotechnology (2002-2008).

== Awards and honors ==
He has been awarded many prestigious awards by the Government of Pakistan on different occasions. These are:

- Hilal-i-Imtiaz (Crescent of Excellence) Award by the Government of Pakistan in 2004.
- Sitara-i-Imtiaz (Star of Excellence) Award by the Government of Pakistan in 1998.
- Tamgha-e-Imtiaz (Medal of Excellence) Award by the Government of Pakistan in 1988.
- Gold medal by the Pakistan Academy of Sciences in 1993.
- Distinguished National Professor Award by the Higher Education Commission (Pakistan) in 2005.

In 1997, he was awarded ISESCO Prize in Biology. Malik is a Fellow of the Pakistan Academy of Sciences and is one of five leading scientists and technologists appointed by the government to the Pakistan Council for Science and Technology.

== Services ==
He is the Vice Chairman of National Technology Council (Pakistan) (NTC).
