= Chief secretary (Pakistan) =

Highest-ranking civil servant

Chief Secretaries of Pakistan
- Reports to: Prime Minister of Pakistan
- Residence: Chief Secretary House (Sindh, Punjab, Balochistan and KPK)
- Seat: Provincial Secretariat
- Appointer: Prime Minister of Pakistan

In Pakistan, the position of Chief Secretary (Urdu: معتمدِ اعلٰی) is occupied by the highest-ranking civil servant in each of provinces or administrative units (excluding Islamabad Capital Territory). The Chief Secretaries are the executive administrative heads of their respective provinces.

== Current Chief Secretaries in Pakistan ==
| Province/Territory | Name | Took office (tenure length) | Ref. |
|---|---|---|---|
| Azad Kashmir (list) | Khushal Khan | 19 December 2024 (1 year, 306 days) | |
| Balochistan (list) | Shakeel Qadir Khan | 18 August 2023 (3 years, 64 days) | |
| Gilgit-Baltistan (list) | Abrar Ahmed Mirza | 24 October 2023 (2 years, 362 days) | |
| Khyber Pakhtunkhwa (list) | Shahab Ali Shah | 21 March 2023 (3 years, 214 days) | |
| Punjab (list) | Zahid Akhtar Zaman | 24 December 2022 (3 years, 301 days) | |
| Sindh (list) | Asif Hyder Shah | 12 March 2024 (2 years, 223 days) | |

== See also ==
- Cabinet Secretary of Pakistan
- Secretary to Government of Pakistan
- Principal Secretary
- Advocate General
- Attorney-General for Pakistan
- Inspector-general of police
