= Chief Secretary of Sindh =

Bureaucratic chief of the Pakistani province of Sindh

- مُعْتَمَدِ اعلٰی سِندھ معتمدِ اعلٰی سنڌ
- Emblem of Sindh

- Flag of Sindh
- Incumbent; Syed Asif Hyder Shah since March 12, 2024
- Government of Sindh
- Style: His Excellency
- Type: Chief Executive of Sindh
- Abbreviation: CS
- Member of: Cabinet of Sindh (Administrative Head)
- Reports to: Prime Minister of Pakistan
- Residence: Chief Secretary House, Sindh
- Seat: Karachi
- Nominator: Establishment Division
- Appointer: Prime Minister of Pakistan
- Term length: At The Pleasure of the Prime Minister
- Formation: 15 August 1947; 79 years ago
- Website: Government of Sindh

The Chief Secretary of Sindh (Urdu: معتمدِ اعلٰی سندھ), also referred to as CS Sindh, is the bureaucratic chief and highest-ranking official of the Government of Sindh. The position holder is usually a Grade-22 officer of the Pakistan Administrative Service. The position of Chief Secretary is equivalent to the rank of Federal Secretary. The current Chief Secretary of Sindh is Syed Asif Hyder Shah, in office since March 12, 2024.

The Prime Minister directly appoints the Chief Secretary. The Chief Secretary also serves as the Cabinet Secretary of Sindh.

== Powers ==
The Chief Secretary Sindh is the top administrative authority of Sindh, controlling the entire government machinery and through whom all departments, operations and major provincial matters flow. They are appointed by the Prime Minister of Pakistan. They serve as the administrative head of the Government of Sindh and final authority of the Sindh bureaucracy. All Provincial Secretaries, Divisional Commissioners, police officials and other senior administrative officers report to the Chief Secretary. The Chief Secretary coordinates with the Chief Minister on all matters related to the province. The CS also coordinates closely with the Sindh Cabinet, ensuring that its policy decisions are executed across departments. The Chief Secretary is a key decision-maker in the Government of Sindh and oversees the implementation of major decisions across the province.

== Workplace & Residence ==
The Chief Secretary of Sindh is the official head of the Sindh Secretariat and their principal workplace is located there, being its highest-ranking official. The official residence of the Chief Secretary Sindh is the Chief Secretary House, also known as Hardley House. The residence is apart of the Red Zone and is also used as the Chief Secretary's official Camp Office and a secure conference room for usually closed door meetings with bureaucratic and political aids, officers and politicians. The completion of the Chief Secretary's House was in 1846, shortly after the British annexation of Sindh in 1843. This makes it one of the oldest surviving colonial-era structures in Karachi. Over the decades as the administrative needs of the British Raj and later the Government of Pakistan grew, the building underwent several expansions and renovations while retaining its core historical footprint.

=== Architectural Style and Layout ===
Colonial Architecture: The building is a classic specimen of British colonial architecture in the subcontinent. It reflects the grand, stately style utilized by the British for high-ranking administrative officers.

Materials: Like many of Karachi's prominent heritage buildings from that era, it is constructed using locally sourced yellow Gizri sandstone and features high ceilings and wide verandas designed to combat the local heat.

Dual Functionality: Beyond being a private residence, the Chief Secretary House traditionally serves a vital functional role as a camp office. It is used to host high-level administrative meetings, official dinners, and gatherings of top-tier civil servants, politicians and diplomats.

Before being the Chief Secretary's residence, the house was resided by Sir Shahnawaz Bhutto while he was serving as Chief Advisor to the Governor during the cruisial period of Sindh's separation from the Bombay Presidency. The house was later resided by his son, Zulfikar Ali Bhutto, the fourth President and ninth Prime Minister of Pakistan. Hardley House was also the official residence of Chief Ministers of Sindh till 1955. Afterwards in 1970, the house became the official home to Chief Secretaries. The Chief Secretary House is located in Club Road, Civil Lines.

== List of Chief Secretaries ==
The following table lists down the names of chief secretaries that have remained in office since June 2000.

No.	Names of Chief Secretaries	Entered office	Left office
1	Javed Ashraf Hussain	June 2000	July 2002
2	KB Rind	July 2002	June 2003
3	Mutawakkil Kazi	June 2003	July 2004
4	Aslam Sanjrani	July 2004	May 2005
5	Fazal-ur-Rehman	May 2005	March 2007
6	Shakeel Durrani	March 2007	July 2007
7	Ejaz Qureshi	July 2007	November 2007
8	Fazal-ur-Rehman	November 2007	August 2010
9	Muhammad Ijaz Chaudhry	April 2013	November 2013
10	Sajjad Saleem Hotiana	November 2013	March 2015
11	Muhammad Siddique Memon	March 2015	November 2016
12	Rizwan Memon	November 2016	June 2018
13	Azam Suleman Khan	June 2018	September 2018
14	Mumtaz Ali Shah	September 2018	March 2022
15	Sohail Rajput	April 2022	August 2023
16	Fakhre Alam Irfan	August 2023	March 2024
17	Syed Asif Hyder Shah	March 2024	Incumbent

== See also ==
- Federal Secretary
- Pakistan Administrative Service
- Cabinet Secretary of Pakistan
- Establishment Secretary of Pakistan
- Chief Secretary Punjab
- Chief Secretary (Pakistan)
