= PK-81 Peshawar-X =

Pakistani electoral district

- Constituency for the Khyber Pakhtunkhwa Assembly
- Region: Peshawar Cantonment and City areas of Peshawar District

Current constituency
- Party: Pakistan Tehreek-e-Insaf
- Member(s): Wajid Ullah Khan
- Created from: PK-04 Peshawar-IV (2002-2018); PK-75 Peshawar-X (2018-2023)

PK-81 Peshawar-X (پی کے-81 پشاور-10) is a constituency for the Khyber Pakhtunkhwa Assembly of the Khyber Pakhtunkhwa province of Pakistan.

== See also ==
- PK-80 Peshawar-IX
- PK-82 Peshawar-XI
