= Hyderabad Municipal Corporation =

Municipal corporation in Pakistan

Hyderabad Municipal Corporation بلدیہ اعلی حیدرآباد

Leadership
- Mayor: Kashif Shoro, PPP since 20 June 2023
- Deputy Mayor: Saghir Qureshi, PPP since 20 June 2023
- Leader of the Opposition: Rehan Rajput, PTI since 16 July 2023 To 27 August 2024.
- Muhammad Nuzair Khan, PTI since 28 August 2024
- Administrator: Shoaib Ahmed Malik; Anees Ahmed Dasti, Pakistan Administrative Service
- Seats: 160

Elections
- Last election: 2023

Footnotes
- After the dissolution of Councils and completion of Mayor's Tenure, the Government of Sindh appoints and designates powers of Mayor and Council to some administrative officer.

Hyderabad Municipal Corporation (Sindhi: حيدرآباد ميونسپلٽي, Urdu: بلدیہ اعلی حیدرآباد abbreviated as HMC) is a public corporation and governing body to provide municipal services in Hyderabad and Latifabad Talukas of Hyderabad district in Sindh, Pakistan. The longest serving head of HMC was Jamil Ahmed.

Hyderabad Municipal Corporation has 96 general seats and 47 reserved seats. it was made defunct in Sindh Local Ordinance 2001, but was revived by PPP government. Qasimabad was taken out of HMC and formed into a separate municipal committee.

The 96 elected chairmen of Union Committee become members of Hyderabad Municipal Corporation and elect their mayor and deputy mayor.

HMC comprises 160 Union Councils of Hyderabad city and Latifabad Talukas.

On August 30, 2016, MQM's Mayor and deputy mayor took office in Hyderabad Municipal Corporation.

== Hyderabad Local Elections ==
=== Election 1987 ===
Hyderabad Municipal Corporation Elections 1987
| Panel | | HMC | Percentage % |
|---|---|---|---|
| 1 | Haq Parast | 40 | 66.7% |
| 2 | Others | 20 | 33.3% |
| Total | | 60 | 100% |

=== Election 2005 ===
City District Government Hyderabad Elections 2005
| Panel | | Hyderabad City | Latifabad | Qasimabad | CDGH | Percentage % |
|---|---|---|---|---|---|---|
| 1 | Haq Parast | 19 | 14 | 2 | 35 | 61.5% |
| 2 | Awam Dost | 1 | 3 | 13 | 17 | 38.5% |
| Total | | 20 | 17 | 15 | 52 | 100% |

=== Election 2015 ===
Hyderabad Municipal Elections 2015
| Party | | Hyderabad City | Latifabad | HMC | Percentage % |
|---|---|---|---|---|---|
| 1 | Muttahida Qaumi Movement | 36 | 43 | 78 | 82.2% |
| 2 | Pakistan Peoples Party | 15 | 1 | 16 | 16.8% |
| 3 | Independents | 1 | - | 1 | 1% |
| Total | | 52 | 44 | 96 | 100% |
| Votes Polled | | 351,253 | | | 50% |
| Total Votes | | 700,666 | | | 100% |

On August 24, 2016, through Mayor elections, Tayyab Hussain and Suhail Mashadi of MQM were elected Mayor and Deputy Mayor of Hyderabad respectively. They bagged 111 votes, while their rival PPP candidates got 27 votes. They took oath on August 30, 2016.

== See also ==
- Mayor of Hyderabad
