= Tando Qaiser =

- Union council
- Interactive map of Tando Qaiser
- Coordinates: 25°23′0″N 68°31′0″E
- Country: Pakistan
- Province: Sindh
- District: Hyderabad District
- Tehsil: Hyderabad Taluka (rural)

Government
  - DCO: Commissioner of Police
  - Nazim: Muhammad Shah Rizwi

Population
  - Total: more than 25,000

Tando Qaiser (Sindhi: ٽنڊو قيصر) is a town in Hyderabad District, Pakistan. It is named after the 18th-century leader of the Nizamani tribe in Sindh, Qaiser Khan Nizamani, who founded the village after his son Gulham Ali Nizamani died there whilst Qaiser, his older brother, Aloda and their forces were moving north to their original home of Dera Ghazi Khan in Southern Punjab. Tando means 'fortified settlement' and indicates the original settlement founded by Qaiser was a militarily fortified settlement.

== History ==
Qaiser Khan was a great-grandson of Nizamuddin Rind (also known as Nizam Sakhi) of Dera Ghazi Khan. Nizam Sakhi is buried in a tomb in Choti Nawab, Dera Ghazi Khan. He was a Rind Baluch and Nizamani is a Rind sub-tribe which is now spread over Southern Punjab and Sindh. Qaiser entered Sindh sometime around A.D. 1750 with his regiment to join the army of the then Kalhora kings of Sindh at the invitation of the Talpur tribe who were already serving the Kalhora dynasty as the leaders of the Kalhora army. At the time, the Talpurs formed the major part of the Kalhora army and commanded that army. Subsequently, around A.D. 1780, the Talpur chief Fateh Ali overthrew the Kalhora kings with the support of Qaiser and the Nizamani contingent of the army as well as the support of other Baloch chieftains.

However, the alliance with Fateh Ali did not last long and for various reasons Qaiser fell out with the Talpur chief and, therefore, decided to go back to Dera Ghazi Khan. On the way back, his son Ghulam Ali fell ill and died close to the current town of Tando Qaiser around A.D. 1790. Qaiser, then well in his 70s, was extremely saddened by the demise of his beloved son and decided to go no further and settled close to where he had buried his son. Qaiser's sorrow is carved in Persian words on Ghulam Ali's grave which roughly translate as 'I stand sorrowful at the death of my son'. Qaiser fortified his settlement, which subsequently grew and became famous as Tando Qaiser.

At about the time of the invasion of Sindh by the British East India Company in A.D. 1843 which led to the battles of Miani and Dabo, Tando Qaiser was a thriving town led by Qaiser's great grandsons Ghulam Ali and Ghulam Hussain. Ghulam Hussain was martyred whilst Ghulam Ali was wounded at the Battle of Miani where both fought against the army of the East India Company under the command of General Charles Napier. Many other men from Tando Qaiser were also martyred or wounded at Miani and Dabo. Thereafter the British occupied Sindh and the supremacy of the Baluch tribes in Sindh came to an end. The British gave favours to those who gave allegiance to them and awarded titles such as 'Sir' and 'Nawab' as well as grants of lands. In particular, the Hindu community greatly benefited and grew in wealth and prominence. The Sindhi community also benefited. The Hindu Thakurs of Tando Qaiser became highly successful in business, trade, and industry. Mango produced in Tando Qaiser were sold in the markets of Mumbai (formerly Bombay) by the Thakurs. They also established a cotton factory in Tando Qaiser in the early part of the 20th century but due to the independence of Pakistan in 1947, they left Tando Qaiser and their established cotton factory was sold to Haji Wahi Dino Pahore. With that, industrialisation ended in Tando Qaiser.

== Education ==
The opening of Agriculture College, and then Sindh Agriculture University in Tando Jam, left a great impact on the social set-up of Tando Qaiser. A large number of youths from Tando Qaiser graduated from that university. Although most of them are Nizamani and Khaskheli and Dayo communities, other like Khore youths graduated from that Agriculture University.

The literacy rate in Tando Qaiser is high.There are a large number of graduates in different areas, including agriculture, medical, engineering, business administration, information technology and education.

A number of educated people from Tando Qaiser have migrated to other countries, including Australia, Sweden, UK, USA and Canada.

== Distribution of population ==
Tando Qaiser has a population in excess of 25,000+. Consequently, the town is split into several neighborhoods (paro), named after the people living in that vicinity. These neighborhoods include:

- Hamazani Paro
- Bakhrani Paro
- Baqanee Paro
- Qaisrani Paro
- Khairani Paro
- Khaskhaylee Paro
- Koree Paro
- Kumbhar Paro
- Lohar Paro
- Nazrani Paro
- Roshan Shah Paro
- Juman Nizamani colony
- Mushtaq colony
- Khor Paro
- Qasim Colony
- Shafi Colony
- Maka Colony
- Noor Ahmed Colony
- Potho colony

Nowadays, people from Tando Qaiser live in different parts of Pakistan. Some of them also live abroad, including in the Middle East, Far East Asia, Europe, Australia, Canada, and the United States.

== Revenue limits ==
Tando Qaiser is one of the three circles of Hyderabad Taluka (rural), with Husri and Hatri being the other two circles. Tando Qaisar comprises eight tapas including Tando Qaiser with dehs Tando Qaiser, Dhamchani and Bhindo; Tapo Tando Qaiser-A with dehs Rahuki, Daliwadi and Rajpari; Tapo Tando Hyder with dehs Narejani, Chacha Detho and Bochki; Tapo Tando Hyder-A with dehs Mori and Rukhanpur and Tapo Hussain Thoro with dehs Gul Mohammad Thoro, Hussain Thoro and Ghotana Mati; Tapo A-Hussain Khan Thoro comprises dehs Kunar and Pashaiki; Tapo Moolan consist of dehs Chukhi, Takio, Jewan Shah, Thaheem and Moolan; Tapo Moolan-A consists of dehs Liyar Jagir, Thebo and Almani.

== Economy ==
The economy of Tando Qaiser is mainly based on agriculture. The town is surrounded by lush green orchards of mango, guava, and jujube (Ziziphus mauritiana). Mangoes, guava and jujube from Tando Qaiser are very famous. They are not only sold around the country, but also exported to other countries. A large number of people are involved in the production, harvest, and marketing of these fruits. Tando Qaiser has higher wages for construction, Plumbing and agriculture workers due to higher purchasing power of residents.

Local businesses and trade services form a major component of the growth of the communal economy. Concurrently, such business schemes further serve as viable sources of income for residents. Notably, the renowned Tando Qaiser 'bazaar' forms an integral aspect of income generated from business in the locality.

== Notable people ==
Kadir Bux Kaiserani s/o Fateh Ali Kaiserani left Tando Kaiser at the age of 16 in 1930 for the Soviet Union. He became the first Western-educated Nizamani of Tando Kaiser and on his return to what was then India in 1933, became active in the Indian independence movement and general secretary of the Sindh branch of the Indian Communist party as well as a founding member of the Hari Movement in Sindh. He also wrote the first history in Sindhi of the Battle of Miani as well as translating into Sindhi the English travelogue of Pottinger – Sindh Jo Safar.

Abdul Qadir Kaiserani left Tando Kaiser for Karachi in 1940s and gained an education, becoming a famous journalist and head of Pakistan News Agency during the time of General Zia.

Kaiser Khan Nizamani is an actor, producer and director. Along with the highest civilian award from the state of Pakistan, that is the Pride of Performance award, which was awarded in 2018 by the Governor of Sindh, he was also the first person to start private drama production on a vast commercial basis. He also has an LLB degree and enrollment as a lawyer.
