= XM Cyber =

Israeli cybersecurity software company

XM Cyber Ltd.
- Type: Private
- Founders: Tamir Pardo, Noam Erez, Boaz Gorodinsky, Shaul Shani
- Headquarters: Tel Aviv-Yafo
- Key people: Noam Erez (CEO), Tamir Pardo (president)
- Number of employees: 100 (November 2021)
- Parent: Schwarz Group
- Website: www.xmcyber.com

XM Cyber Ltd. is a cybersecurity software company that specializes in exposure management. The company tools proactively identify and mitigate cybersecurity risks before they can lead to significant breaches.

The company's headquarters are located in Tel Aviv, with offices in Dallas, London, and Neckarsulm, Germany.

== History ==
The company was founded by Tamir Pardo (president of the company), Noam Erez (CEO), Boaz Gorodisky (CTO) and Shaul Shani in April 2016.

In 2018, the company raised $10 million as an initial fundraising from Swarth Group, controlled by Shaul Shani. In November of the same year, the company raised a $22 million funding round, which includes Macquarie Capital, Nasdaq Ventures, Our Innovation Fund, LP and UST Global.

In July 2020, the company raised $17 million in a Series B funding round with Macquarie Capital, Nasdaq Ventures, Our Innovation Fund, and Swarth Group.

In November 2021, most of the company's shares were sold to the German retail concern Schwarz Group for $700 million.

On June 27, 2022, XM Cyber announced its acquisition of Israeli startup Cyber Observer for an estimated $30 million for integrating Cyber Observer's continuous controls monitoring capabilities.

On March 22, 2023, XM Cyber announced its acquisition of Confluera, a company specializing in next-generation cyberattack detection and response for cloud environments.

On February 27, 2024, XM Cyber introduced for its users a generative AI-powered chat interface with real-time security insights through a natural language interface.

On May 2, 2024, XM Cyber and Integrity360 launched CTEM-as-a-Service to help organizations manage and reduce cybersecurity risks. At the same time, XM Cyber published research showing that 80% of organizational exposures are linked to vulnerabilities in misconfigured or outdated systems. In June, the firm launched SAP Exposure Management to protect business-critical applications. In October, it announced a partnership with ACE Pacific to distribute its cybersecurity services across the Asia-Pacific (APAC) region.

== Technology ==
The company's product simulates an attack, allowing customers to see how their system defenses perform. This helps identify security weaknesses that need to be addressed. The product runs on Amazon's AWS cloud, Microsoft Azure, and Google's GCP platforms.
