= Chukhi =

Pakistani village

Chukhi Goth Chukhi
- Village
- Location in Sindh Chukhi (Pakistan)
- Coordinates: 25.30622°N 68.581853°E
- Country: Pakistan
- Region: Sindh
- District: Hyderabad

Population (2017)
  - Total: 7,247
- Time zone: UTC+5 (PST)
  - Summer (DST): UTC+6 (PDT)

Chukhi, or Goth Chukhi, is a village and deh in Hyderabad taluka of Hyderabad District, Sindh. As of 2017, it has a population of 7,247, in 1,460 households. It is part of the assessment circle of Moolan.
