= Avi Hasson =

Israeli economist

- אבי חסון

Chief Scientist, Ministry of Economy State of Israel
- In office Jan 2011 – April 2017
- President: Reuven Rivlin
- Prime Minister: Benjamin Netanyahu
- Deputy: Zachi Schnarch Lydia Lazanes Aviram Zolti
- Preceded by: Dr. Eli Opper

Avi Hasson (Hebrew: אבי חסון) is the CEO of Startup Nation Central. Previously, he was the Chief Scientist of the Ministry of Economy (formerly Ministry of Industry, Trade and Labor) of the State of Israel.

== Biography ==
Avi Hasson holds Bachelor of Arts degrees in Economics and Middle Eastern Studies, and a Master of Business Administration from Tel Aviv University. He is a graduate of the IDF's elite HAMAN-TALPIOT Program, where he served as an intelligence officer of the Israel Defense Forces.

== Business career ==
Hasson held a ten-year tenure with Gemini Israel Funds, where he served as General Partner and managed investments in communications, storage and consumer electronics. Before this time, he spent a decade working for several leading telecommunications companies, such as ECI Telecom, ECtel and Tadiran Systems, where he fulfilled roles in product marketing and business development.

== Governmental career ==
Hasson served as Israel's chief scientist for six years, from January 2011 to April 2017.
