= DCO =

DCO may refer to:

== Astronomy ==
- Dark compact object, a dark compact star

== Technology ==
- Device configuration overlay, of a computer hard disk drive
- Digitally controlled oscillator, in electronics
- Siemens DCO, a telephone switch
- Drift City Online, a game
- Domain controller, on Microsoft Servers
- Developer Certificate of Origin, used in open source software projects to verify individual contributions

== Other ==
- Deep Carbon Observatory
- Development Consent Order, the means of obtaining permission for nationally significant projects in England and Wales
- Digital Cooperation Organization, an international organization
- Dimension Century Orguss, anime series
- Direct commission officer, a military rank
- Disney Channel Original (disambiguation)
- District coordination officer, a civil service position in Pakistan
- Driver-controlled operation, a method of manually operating a train
- The British Columbia Regiment (Duke of Connaught's Own), a regiment of the Canadian Forces
- Duke of Cambridge's Own, a.k.a. Middlesex Regiment
- Dynamic Creative Optimization, a term used in programmatic marketing
- D.Co., an abbreviation used for the United States District Court for the District of Colorado
- Docket Control Order, a legal document used to confirm court deadlines.
- Document Control Officer controls access to documents that are restricted to certain people
- Ducommun (NYSE ticker DCO)
