= Mayor of Hyderabad, Pakistan =

Mayor of Hyderabad
- حيدرآباد جو نظام ناظم حیدرآباد
- Hyderabad Municipal Corporation
- Incumbent; Kashif Shoro since 9 June 2023
- Hyderabad Municipal Corporation
- Status: 2016-2020 (new elections to be held)
- Seat: HMC Building
- Appointer: Electorate of Hyderabad
- Term length: 4 years

The Mayor of Hyderabad (Sindhi: حيدرآباد جو نظامUrdu: ناظم حیدرآباد) heads the Hyderabad Municipal Corporation (HMC), the local body which controls the Local Government system of Hyderabad. The longest-serving mayor of Hyderabad was Jamil Ahmed, who was elected twice to the office of mayor and served from 1962 to 1971. The current mayor of Hyderabad is Kashif Shoro who belongs to PPP.

== Local government system of Hyderabad ==
Hyderabad Local Government system is the Third Tier of the system of political governance in Pakistan after the Federal Government and the Provincial Government. Hyderabad Local government is managed by Hyderabad Municipal Corporation (HMC) according to Sindh Local Government act 2013. HMC looks after local government system of the towns of Hyderabad city and Latifabad.

== Jinnah Hall ==
Jinnah Hall has historical significance and it is the meeting place for Hyderabad city council sessions.

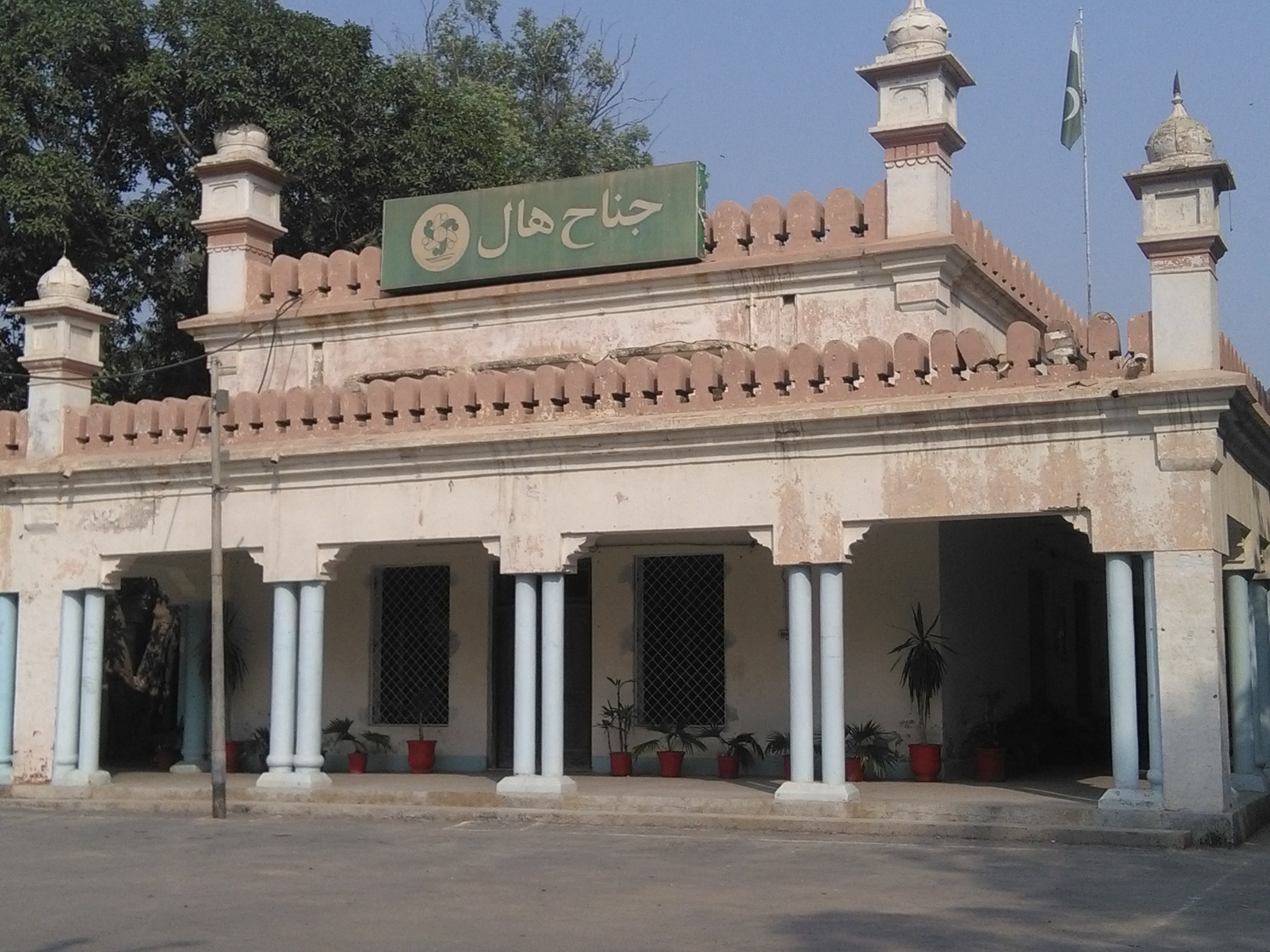
Jinnah Hall

== List of mayors of Hyderabad ==
List of mayors of Hyderabad
#	Mayor	Date took office	Date left office
1	Jamil Ahmed	1962	1971
Administrator system was implemented in 1971 - 1979
2	Maulana Wasi Mazhar Nadvi	1979	1983
3	Ahad Yusuf	1983	1987
4	Aftab Ahmed Sheikh	1987	1992
Administrator system was implemented in 1992 - 2000
5	Dr Makhdoom Rafik Zaman	2001	2005
6	Kunwar Naveed Jamil	October 18, 2005	Feb 17th, 2010
Commissioner system was implemented in 2010 - 2016
7	Tayyab Hussain	August 30, 2016	August 2020
Administrator system implemented from September 2020 - June 2023
8	Kashif Shoro	June 9, 2023	Present

== Hyderabad local government history ==
=== City District Government Hyderabad (2000 - 2010) ===
According to Sindh Local Government Ordinance (SLGO) 2001, three new districts (formerly its talukas) were made in 2005. Latifabad, Qasimabad and Hyderabad city.

City of Hyderabad underwent major development during the tenure of Kunwar Naveed Jamil. Many flyovers such as Latifabad flyover, Hosh Muhammad Shedi flyover, Ghulam Shah Kalhoro flyover, Sakhi Abdul Wahab flyover, renovation of Hyderabad Eid Gah, renovation of Rani Bagh, renovation of Hasrat Mohani Library, construction of Hyderabad Civic Centre, several parks for public recreation etc.

In 2010 after mayor of Hyderabad completed his term, the City District Government Hyderabad was dissolved and the administrator system was implemented in 2010 - 2016

=== Hyderabad Municipal Corporation (2013 - present) ===
Hyderabad City District Government was abolished by PPP in 2010 and imposed commissioner system. Sindh Local Government Act (SLGA) 2013 was passed in order to counter SLGO 2001 which was passed by Pervez Musharraf. The ruling Pakistan Peoples Party has separated Qasimabad district from the HMC to create the 27-ward municipal committee. However the formation of the Qasimabad municipal committee has already been challenged before the Sindh High Court.

on the orders of Supreme court, Sindh Government finally conducted Hyderabad Local Government election after a gap of 6 years as a second phase of Local Government elections in Sindh. comprised District of Latifabad and Hyderabad City.

Hyderabad was distributed into 96 Union committees.

== Mayor election 2016 ==
Hyderabad Mayor Elections 2016
Party		Candidates	HMC	Percentage %
1	Muttahida Qaumi Movement	Tayyab Hussain	111	77.6%
2	Pakistan Peoples Party	Pasha Qazi	27	19%
3	did not vote		5	3.4%
Total			143	100%

On August 24, 2016, through Mayor elections, Tayyab Hussain and Suhail Mashadi of MQM were elected Mayor and Deputy Mayor of Hyderabad respectively. They bagged 111 votes, while their rival PPP candidates got 27 votes. They took oath on August 30, 2016.

Many of the MQM chairmen and vice chairmen were elected unopposed even before the elections.

== See also ==
- Kunwar Naveed Jamil
- Hyderabad
- Mayor of Karachi
- Latifabad
