= Ganjo =

Ganjo may refer to:

- Ganjo Takkar, a limestone hill range in the Sindh province of Pakistan
- the Australian name for a Banjo guitar

== See also ==
- Ganjō-ji, a Buddhist temple in Iwaki, Fukushima Prefecture, Japan
