= Haji Sawan Khan Gopang =

Coordinates: 25.4667°N 68.4000°E

- Union council
- Interactive map of Haji Sawan Khan Gopang
- Country: Pakistan
- Province: Sindh
- District: Hyderabad District
- Tehsil: Havelian

Government
  - Nazim: Haji Badar Ahmed
  - Naib Nazim: Allah Bachio

Population
  - Total: 24,000

Haji Sawan Khan Gopang is a Union council of Hyderabad Taluka (rural) in the Sindh province of Pakistan. It has a population of 24,005.
