= Narejani =

Narejani Nārejāni
- Village
- Location in Sindh Narejani (Pakistan)
- Coordinates: 25.419138°N 68.432607°E
- Country: Pakistan
- Region: Sindh
- District: Hyderabad

Population (2017)
  - Total: 17,270
- Time zone: UTC+5 (PST)
  - Summer (DST): UTC+6 (PDT)

Narejani is a village and deh in Hyderabad taluka of Hyderabad District, Sindh, Pakistan. As of 2017, it has a population of 17,270, in 3,408 households. It is part of the Tapedar circle of Tando Haider.
