= Ghotana =

- Village
- Location in Sindh Ghotana (Pakistan)
- Coordinates: 25.320935°N 68.557558°E
- Country: Pakistan
- Region: Sindh
- District: Hyderabad

Population (2017)
  - Total: 2,639
- Time zone: UTC+5 (PST)
  - Summer (DST): UTC+6 (PDT)

Ghotana is a village and deh in Hyderabad taluka of Hyderabad District, Sindh. As of 2017, it has a population of 2,639, in 544 households. It is part of the tapedar circle of Hussain Khan Thoro.
