= Village Gul Muhammad Chhalgri =

Village in Hyderabad, Pakistan

Gul Muhammad Chhalgri (Sindhi: ڳوٺ گل محمد ڇلگري) is a community village located at union council Masu Bhurgri of District Hyderabad Sindh province of Pakistan.This Village has Government Boys Primary School Gul Muhammad Chhalgri and Government Girls Primary School Gul Muhammad Chhalgri.
