= Moosa Khatiyan =

Coordinates: 25.4667°N 68.4000°E

- Union council
- Interactive map of Moosa Khatiyan
- Country: Pakistan
- Province: Sindh
- District: Hyderabad District

Government
  - Nazim: Shafqat Hussain Shah
  - Naib Nazim: Muhammad Sharif

Moosa Khatiyan is a union council of Hyderabad Taluka (rural) in the Sindh province of Pakistan.
