= Devoteam Group =

French tech consulting company

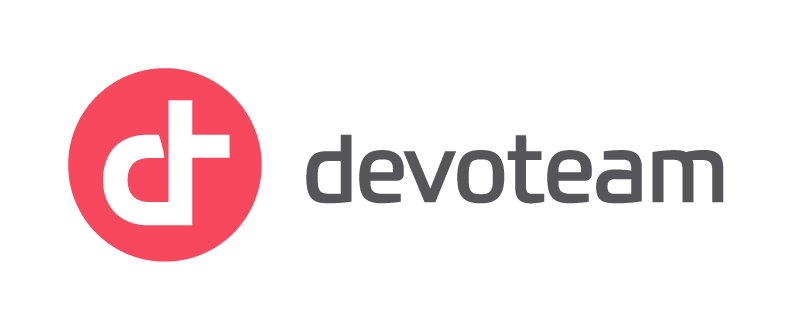
- Type: SA with board of directors
- Industry: Computer systems and software consulting
- Founded: December 7, 1995
- Founders: Stanislas de Bentzmann, Godefroy de Bentzmann
- Headquarters: Levallois-Perret, France
- Key people: Stanislas de Bentzmann (Co-CEO), Godefroy de Bentzmann (Co-CEO), Sebastien Chevrel (Group Managing Director)
- Products: Consulting services
- Revenue: 1 130 million euros (2023)
- Number of employees: 11 000 (2023)
- Website: www.devoteam.com

Devoteam Group is a French tech consulting company (ESN) founded in 1995. The firm operates platform-agnostic, partnering with Amazon Web Services, Google Cloud, Microsoft, and ServiceNow. The group works with the private (industry and services) and public (public services) sectors of the economy.

After years as a publicly listed company, Devoteam Group returned to private ownership in the fourth quarter of 2021. Founding shareholders Stanislas de Bentzmann and Godefroy de Bentzmann led the transition, supported by US private equity firm KKR, which played a significant role in financing the delisting from the Paris Stock Exchange. Devoteam Group employs more than 11,000 employees in over 25 locations in EMEA.

== History ==
1995–2000: Beginnings

Devoteam Group was founded by Godefroy de Bentzmann and Stanislas de Bentzmann in 1995 in Levallois-Perret, France.

In October 1999, the company was introduced on the Euronext Paris stock exchange with a turnover of 35 million euros.

2000–2010: External acquisitions

Between 2000 and 2010, Devoteam Group expanded internationally and executed several acquisitions. It also established a ServiceNow business.

In 2006, the company Devoteam Telecom & Media was created in Belgium through the acquisitions of Expanded Media and the R&D department of Nokia Siemens Networks R&D, initially based in Herentals, a town in the Flemish Region of the Province of Antwerp. In 2007, the company acquired Teligent AB to develop its telecom services. By 2008, the company had 4,200 employees, and the group was established in 23 countries.

In 2009, Devoteam Group acquired Danet GmbH, a German IT service provider, strengthening its presence in the German market.

2010–2020

In 2011, Devoteam Group expanded its capabilities by acquiring RVR, a company specializing in business continuity plans.

Between 2017 and 2020, Devoteam expanded its cybersecurity offerings with the acquisition of Integrity360 and strengthened its relationship with AWS through the purchase of D2SI (later renamed Revolve).

Acquisitions also included Q-Partners Consulting & Management GmbH in Germany in 2016 and Alegri International Service GmbH, a Microsoft partner specializing in digital workplace and IT transformation; Spanish firm New Bic; Belgian cybersecurity firm Paradigmo; Portuguese technology services provider Bold and Jayway, a Swedish firm in digital design and software development in 2018.

In 2019, it acquired Avalon Solutions, a Google Premier Partner in the Nordics to strengthen its position in Google Cloud technologies and PowerData, a Spanish firm specializing in data integration and data management.

In 2020, Devoteam Group expanded through the acquisition of three companies: Ysance, a French customer data and AI firm; Fourcast, a Belgian Google Cloud partner; and Inviso, a Danish IT consulting firm specializing in Microsoft Power BI.

In 2020, the founders took the company private through a capital operation supported by KKR.

2020: New strategic plan

In 2020, the company carried out a capital operation where the founders, management board members, and major shareholders, Godefroy and Stanislas de Bentzmann, with financial support from KKR, jointly launched a public offer to purchase shares of Devoteam Group. This operation resulted in the holding company Castillon owning just over 80% of the group's capital.

On September 10, after the annual review of the Euronext Paris indices, the Scientific Council of Indices decided to include Devoteam Group in the SBF 120 and CAC Mid 60 indices.

Devoteam Group expanded its 'Knowledge Up' program in Saudi Arabia to include executive education from top universities, helping young talent gain expertise in IT consulting and leading technology in 2021. The company acquired Necsia in Spain to support its Microsoft Cloud services, Cloudeon in Denmark to develop its expertise in Azure and other cloud platforms, Integrity in Portugal to enhance its cybersecurity capabilities, and Nubalia in Spain to strengthen its work with Google Cloud.

In 2022, Devoteam Group launched its first TechRadar publication, which was downloaded by over 6,000 users. That same year, Devoteam acquired Alfun in France and BeClever in Spain.

In April 2023, the company opened a second office in Kaunas, Lithuania, continuing its expansion in the country and focusing on cloud services for projects across Europe. At the same time, IDC named Devoteam the top IT consultancy in Saudi Arabia, with a market share of over 13%, ahead of major competitors like KPMG and EY. In November, the company participated in the launch of Google Cloud's services and local data centers in Saudi Arabia, aiming to provide Google Cloud's technology solutions to businesses in the Kingdom. By 2023 Devoteam reached 1 billion euros in revenue in 25 countries in EMEA, employed over 11,000 staff, and expanded its partnerships to include Snowflake and Databricks.

In late 2023, it made two important acquisitions. In October, the company acquired Singularity Digital Enterprise, a Lisbon-based firm specializing in data analytics, business intelligence, artificial intelligence, machine learning, and data visualization.

This was followed in December by the purchase of Dare Planet Technology, a company focused on DevOps, cloud technologies, and observability.

Since 2024

In 2024, Devoteam Group launched the "Amplify" strategic plan focused on strengthening the company's role in AI-driven technology consulting and doubling the company's revenue by 2028, reaching 2 billion euros, with 50% of revenue generated from AI projects.

In February 2024, Solutions by stc finalized the acquisition of a 40% stake in Devoteam Middle East, valued at approximately SAR 741.7 million (USD 200.2 million), as part of its growth strategy to expand into new markets and business sectors.

In March, it was ranked as the top IT consulting firm in Saudi Arabia's market, valued at SAR 1.4 billion.

In April, Devoteam was named Google Cloud's top Sales Partner for the EMEA region for the fifth consecutive year, recognizing its contribution to the growth of the Google Cloud ecosystem.

In July, Devoteam acquired the Dutch ServiceNow practice of Eraneos to strengthen its capabilities in digital transformation and cloud services; and expanded into the UK market by acquiring AWS consultancy Ubertas Consulting to strengthen its Amazon Cloud presence across the United Kingdom and Ireland. At the same year, the company acquired the Spanish business automation company Inlogiq to strengthen its services in automation and digital transformation.

In October, Devoteam achieved the Google Cloud Generative AI – Services specialization, becoming one of the first global partners to earn this recognition for its expertise in generative AI.

The company also acquired Swedish cloud company ProCori, expanding its Servicenow service portfolio in the Nordic region. 2024 ended with the acquisition of Inlogiq, a company specialising in business automation solutions.
