= Gul Hassan Chhalgri =

Village Gul Hassan Chhalgri Sindhi: گل حسن ڇلگري
- Village
- Country: Pakistan
- Province: Sindh
- District: Hyderabad
- Taluka: Hyderabad
- Time zone: UTC+5 (PST)

Village Gul Hassan Chhalgri (Sindhi: ڳوٺ گل حسن ڇلگري) is community village, located in union council Hatri Taluka Hyderabad in the Pakistan province of Sindh. This village has a Government Boys Primary School Gul Hassan Chhalgri.
