= Hussain Khan Thoro =

Hussain Khan Thoro Thora Husain Khan
- Village
- Location in Sindh Hussain Khan Thoro (Pakistan)
- Coordinates: 25.349773°N 68.549699°E
- Country: Pakistan
- Region: Sindh
- District: Hyderabad

Population (2017)
  - Total: 6,391
- Time zone: UTC+5 (PST)
  - Summer (DST): UTC+6 (PDT)

Hussain Khan Thoro, also called Thora Hussain Khan, is a village and deh in Hyderabad taluka of Hyderabad District, Sindh. As of 2017, it has a population of 6,391, in 1,228 households. It is the head of a tapedar circle which also includes the villages of Ghotana, Gul Mohd Khan, and Mati, Sindh.
