= Central Selection Board =

Pakistani body responsible for selecting civil servants for promotion

The Central Selection Board (CSB) of the Establishment Division is supposed to meet twice in a year to consider promotion opportunities for the appointed employees of Civil Service of Pakistan to BPS-20 grade and BPS-21 grade. The board is chaired by the chairman of the Federal Public Service Commission (FPSC), with its members being Establishment Secretary, Cabinet Secretary, four federal secretaries each having domicile of one of the four provinces and all four provincial chief secretaries. From the Parliament, one member of the Senate of Pakistan and one member of the National Assembly of Pakistan (MNA) are appointed to sit on the board. The secretary of the board is Additional Secretary Establishment Division.

Some of the members of the current board composition includes Kamran Ali Afzal (CS Punjab), Rizwan Ahmed (federal secretary), Mumtaz Ali Shah (CS Sindh), Mohsin Aziz (Senator) and Faiz Ullah Kamoka (MNA).

The CSB sends its recommendations to the prime minister, who then has the final authority to give a go-ahead.
