= Tando Fazal =

- Union council
- Interactive map of Tando Fazal
- Country: Pakistan
- Province: Sindh
- District: Hyderabad District
- Tehsil: Hyderabad Taluka (rural)

Government
  - chairman: Noor Ahmed Thebo
  - vice-chairman: Syed Ali Akber Shah

Tando Fazal is a town and union council of Hyderabad District in the Sindh province of Pakistan. It is part of the rural Taluka of Hyderabad and is located at 25°15′N 68°32′E and lies to the south-east of the capital Hyderabad.
