= Shaul Shani =

Israeli businessman and investor

- שאול שני
- Born: 1955 (age 70–71); Kiryat Eliezer, Haifa, Israel
- Occupation: Businessman
- Known for: Owner of Swarth Group

Shaul Shani (Hebrew: שאול שני; born c. 1955) is an Israeli businessman in the technology industry, and the owner of Swarth Group.

== Early life ==
Shaul Shani was born circa 1955. He grew up in Kiryat Eliezer, Haifa. His father worked at the Port of Haifa.

== Career ==
Shani started investing in the 1980s. He founded Oshap Technologies in 1982. It was listed on the NASDAQ three years later, in 1985. By 1999, he sold it to SunGard for US$210 million. He was also a co-founder of Sapiens International Corporation and Tecnomatix, two companies listed on the NASDAQ which he later sold.

He founded Global Village Telecom, a Brazilian telecommunications company, in 1999. Upon selling it to Vivendi for US$4.5 billion in 2009, he made a profit of US$1.5 billion.

In 2007 Swarth Group and the British fund manager Ashmore bought ECI Telecom for $1.24 billion and took it off the Nasdaq; Shani became chairman. In 2010 he offered to sell ECI to the Russian government for $2.5 billion, but no deal followed. In 2014 he bought out Ashmore's stake and took full control.

In March 2020 Ribbon Communications completed its purchase of ECI for about $463 million in cash and shares, giving Swarth Group a stake of about 23 per cent in Ribbon.

As of January 2024, Forbes estimated Shani's net worth at US$4 billion, ranked 739th worldwide.

== Personal life ==
Shani resides in Italy.
