= Meir Dagan =

Israeli general and Mossad director (1945–2016)

Aluf Meir Dagan
- מאיר דגן
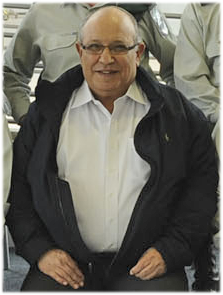
- Dagan in 2011

Director of Mossad
- In office 2002–2011
- Prime Minister: Ariel Sharon; Ehud Olmert; Benjamin Netanyahu
- Preceded by: Efraim Halevy
- Succeeded by: Tamir Pardo

Personal details
- Born: Meir Hubermann; 30 January 1945 Kherson, Ukrainian Soviet Socialist Republic, USSR (present-day Ukraine)
- Died: 17 March 2016 (aged 71)
- Awards: Medal of Courage
- Nickname: King of Shadows

Military service
- Allegiance: Israel
- Branch/service: Israel Defense Forces
- Years of service: 1963–1996
- Rank: Aluf
- Battles/wars: Six-Day War; Yom Kippur War; 1982 Lebanon War

Aluf Meir Dagan (Hebrew: מאיר דגן; 30 January 1945 – 17 March 2016) was an Israel Defense Forces major general (reserve) and director of the Mossad.

== Personal life and education ==
Meir Huberman (later Dagan) was born on a train on the outskirts of Kherson, between the Soviet Union and Poland during World War II to Polish Jewish parents who fled Poland for the Soviet Union to escape the Holocaust. His maternal grandfather, Ber Erlich Sloshny, was killed by the German Nazis in Łuków. In 2009, the Israeli newspaper Yedioth Ahronoth published two photos of Nazi soldiers standing next to a kneeling Sloshny shortly before they shot him. During his term as Director-general of the Mossad, Dagan kept one of the photographs hanging in his office. Meir and his parents survived the Holocaust, and in 1950, the family made aliyah to Israel. During the cattle ship's approach to Israel, it encountered a storm, during which Meir stood on the stern, praying to reach the shore safely. The family initially lived in an immigrant camp in Lod before settling in Bat Yam, where Meir grew up and his parents ran a laundry business.

Dagan was a vegetarian and an amateur painter, who studied painting and sculpture at Tel Aviv University. He was married to Bina and had three children.

== Military and intelligence career ==
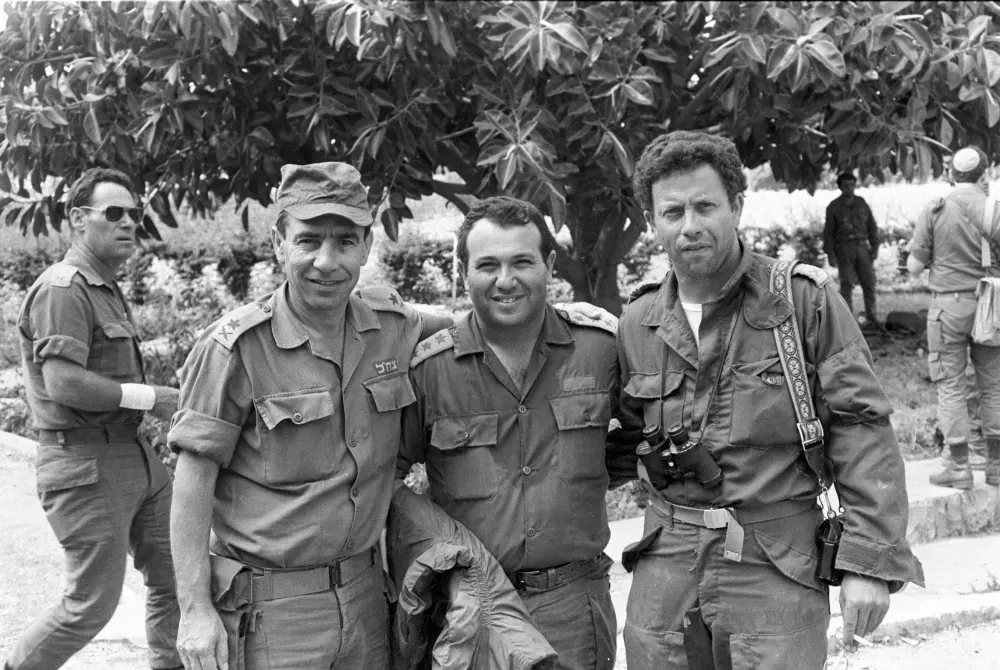
Dagan, center, during the 1982 Lebanon War. To his left is Yossi Ben Hanan, to his right is Haim Nadel, and to the side is Amos Yaron.

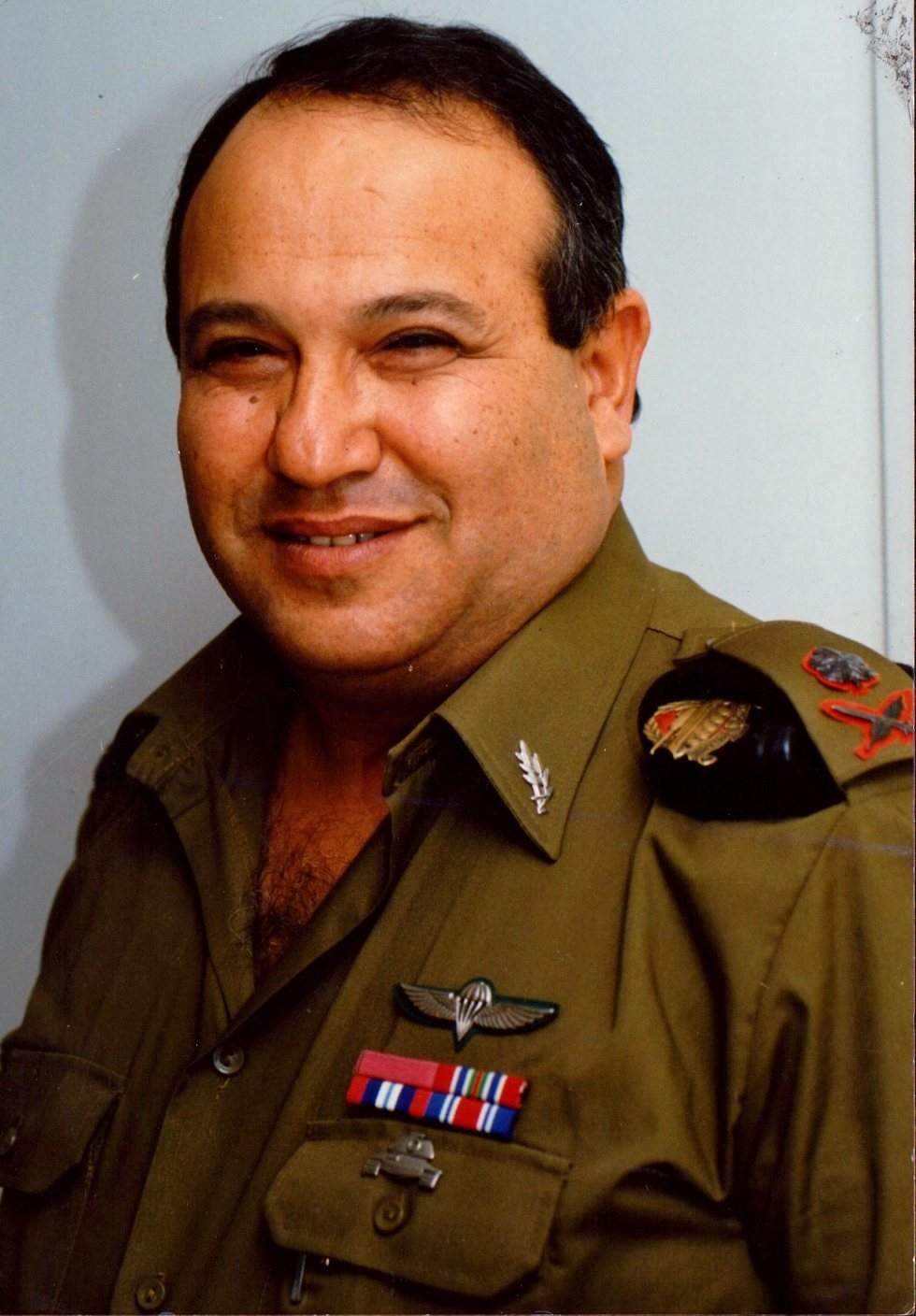
Dagan as a General in 1993

Dagan was conscripted into the Israel Defense Forces (IDF) in 1963. He was considered for the elite Sayeret Matkal unit, but ended up joining the Paratroopers Brigade. He completed his compulsory service in 1966, but was called up as a reservist in 1967, and fought in the Six-Day War as an officer, commanding a paratrooper platoon on the Sinai front.

In 1970, he caught the attention of Ariel Sharon who recruited him to command a special unit, known as Sayeret Rimon, whose task was to hunt suspected terrorists in the Gaza Strip and 'eliminate' them. Sharon stated that Dagan specialized in 'separating an Arab from his head.' In 1971, he received a Medal of Courage for tackling a wanted terrorist who was holding a live grenade. Dagan later fought in the 1973 Yom Kippur War as an officer on the Sinai front, and participated in the crossing of the Suez Canal. During the 1982 Lebanon War, he commanded the Barak Armored Brigade, and was one of the first brigade commanders to enter Beirut. In the 1990s, he held a series of high-level positions in the IDF command, eventually reaching the rank of Major General before retiring from the army in 1995, after 32 years of service.

Dagan later served as a counterterrorism adviser to Prime Minister Benjamin Netanyahu, and he initially served as a National Security Adviser to Prime Minister Ariel Sharon. Sharon appointed him Director-general of Mossad in August 2002, replacing outgoing director Efraim Halevy. As Mossad director, Dagan was responsible for intelligence, counter-intelligence, and counter-terrorism activities outside of Israel and the Palestinian Territories (which are under the jurisdiction of Shabak as they are considered domestic areas). He was allegedly aggressive in ordering killings of terrorists on foreign soil. According to Mossad veteran Gad Shimron, "Israel is in the paradoxical situation of not having a death penalty but allowing itself to target Arab terrorists outside its borders with almost complete impunity. Meir Dagan fully subscribes to this thinking, unlike some of his predecessors". By November 2004, at least four foreign terrorists had already been killed in suspected Mossad operations, and three major terrorist attacks planned against Israeli civilians abroad had been foiled.

Ehud Yatom, a member of the Knesset Subcommittee on Secret Services, stated that "as someone who is privy to the facts but not at liberty to divulge them, I can say this with complete authority. The Mossad under Meir Dagan has undergone a revolution in terms of organization, intelligence and operations." Under Dagan's watch, Mossad tripled its recruitment efforts, launching a website where people can apply to join. Reportedly, much of its annual budget of $350 million was diverted from traditional intelligence gathering and analysis to field operations and "special tasks".

Dagan was reconfirmed as Mossad director until the end of 2008 by Prime Minister Ehud Olmert in February 2007, and in June 2008, Olmert again extended his tenure until the end of 2009.

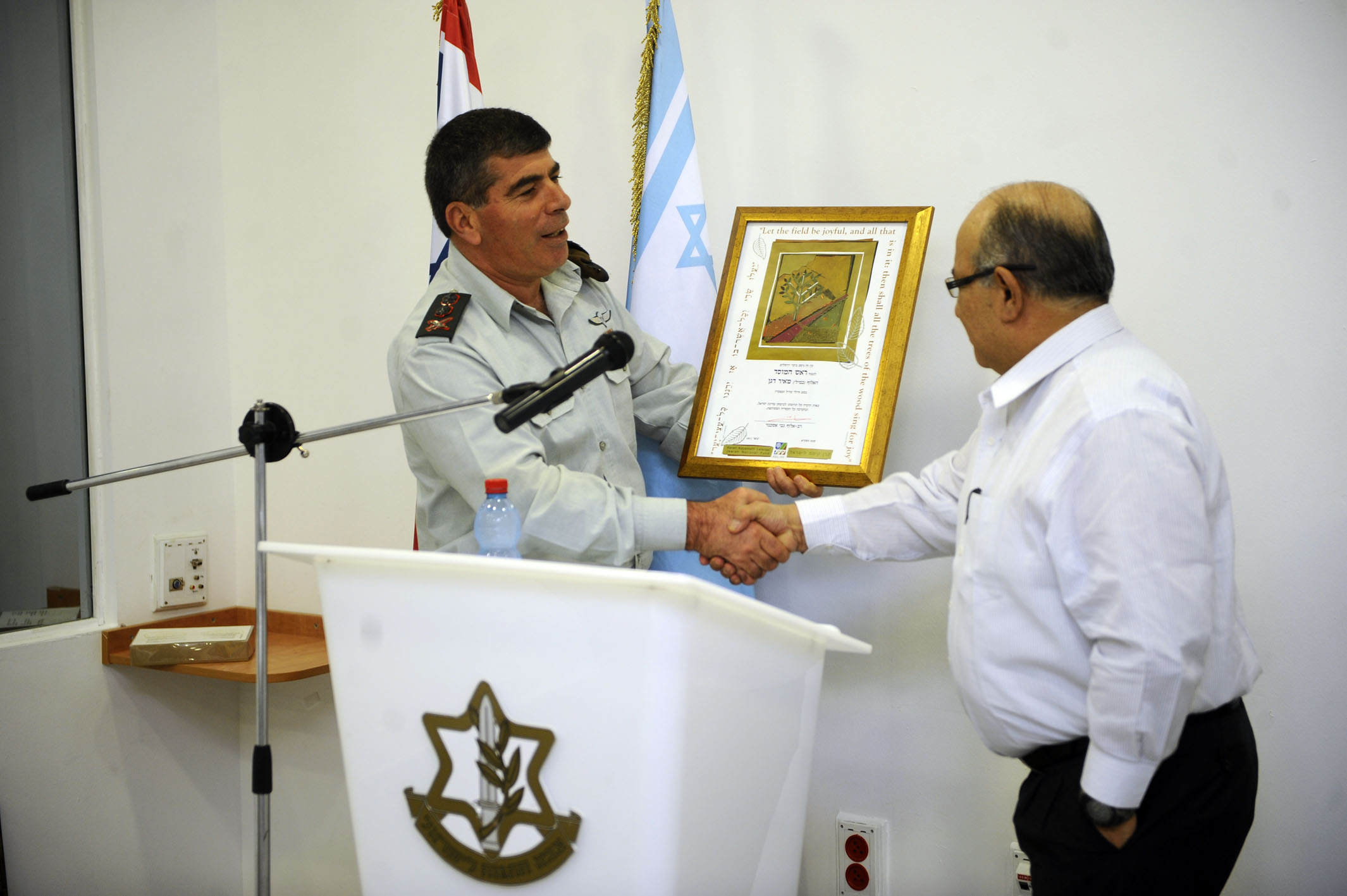
IDF chief of staff Gabi Ashkenazi honoring outgoing Mossad director, Meir Dagan

In mid-2007, Dagan had a "spat" with the Deputy Director N, who was thought to be a candidate for replacing Dagan in late 2008. Dagan restored his former deputy "T" to the post and Dagan was thought likely to recommend "T" as his replacement.

He was re-appointed in 2009 by Prime Minister Benjamin Netanyahu to serve until the end of 2010. In June 2010, a report from Channel 2 stated that Netanyahu had denied a request by Dagan for another year as Mossad director, though this was quickly denied by the Prime Minister's Office. In November 2010, Tamir Pardo was announced as his replacement.

Following his departure, Dagan made several controversial public statements concerning the prudence of an Israeli military attack on Iran's nuclear facilities, openly contradicting the positions of Prime Minister Netanyahu. He called it a "stupid idea" in a May 2011 conference. After Dagan voiced criticism of the prime minister, he was asked to return his diplomatic passport before its expiry date. Dagan repeated the opinion in a March 2012 interview with Lesley Stahl of CBS News' 60 Minutes, calling an Israeli attack on Iran before other options were exhausted "the stupidest idea" and saying he considered the Iranians "a very rational regime."

== Business career ==
Dagan served as the director of the Israel Port Authority, and in 2011 was appointed chairman of Gulliver Energy Ltd. (TASE:GLVR), which announced that it intended to mine uranium at a license in the Dead Sea area and drill in search of gold near Eilat.

He served as honorary president of the Israeli private intelligence agency Black Cube until his death in 2016.

In April 2011, Dagan was awarded the Haim Herzog Award for his unique contribution to the State of Israel.

In May 2011, he won the Moskovitz Award for Zionism.

== Illness and death ==
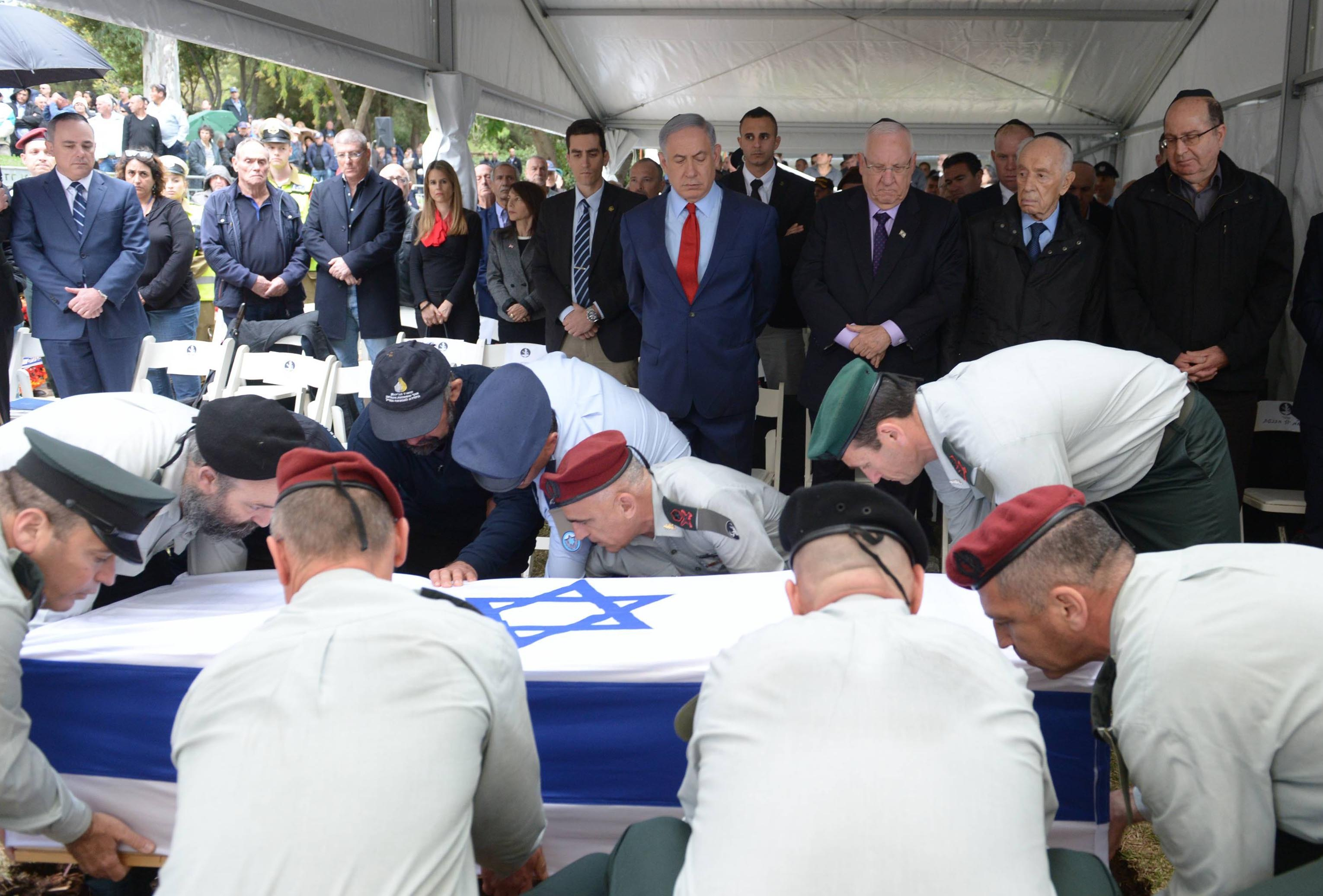
Meir Dagan's funeral, with Benjamin Netanyahu, Reuven Rivlin, Shimon Peres, and Moshe Ya'alon in attendance.

In 2012, Dagan was diagnosed with liver cancer, and began chemotherapy treatment, but the cancer spread and he began to suffer from liver failure. In October of that year, he flew to Belarus and had a successful liver transplant operation performed by French-Jewish surgeon Daniel Azoulay, considered one of the world's leading liver transplant surgeons. After the operation, he was admitted to an isolation unit for fear of infection.

At the time, criteria for a liver transplant in Israel dictated the patient must be no older than 65, so the 67-year-old Dagan had to seek treatment abroad. Israeli foreign minister Avigdor Lieberman helped facilitate the operation. On 27 October 2012, after his condition had stabilized, Dagan returned to Israel and was immediately hospitalized. He was discharged from Ichilov Hospital and began recuperating. Dagan was accompanied throughout his ordeal by Rabbi Avraham Elimelech Firer, with whom he developed a close relationship, and later reciprocated by helping Firer raise funds for a new rehabilitation center.

Despite the transplant, the cancer remained in his body. Dagan died of cancer on 17 March 2016 at the age of 71. President Reuven Rivlin said of Dagan, "Meir was one of the greatest of the brave, creative and devout warriors that the Jewish people ever had. His devotion to the State of Israel was absolute." Netanyahu said, "In his eight years as the head of the Mossad, he led the organization in daring, pioneering and groundbreaking operations. A great warrior has died."

== See also ==
- Assassination of Imad Mughniyah
- Operations conducted by the Mossad
