= Masu Bhurgri =

Coordinates: 25°30′0″N 68°28′0″E

- Union council
- Interactive map of Masu Bhurgri
- Country: Pakistan
- Province: Sindh
- District: Hyderabad District

Government
  - Nazim: Khanwand Bux Alais Ghulam Muhammad
  - Naib Nazim: Muhammad Sharif Dahri

Population
  - Total: 24,362
- Website: Ghaffarhajano.tk

Masu Bhurgri is a union council of Hyderabad Taluka (rural) in the Sindh province of Pakistan. It has a population of 24,300, and is located at 25°30'0N 68°28'0E to the north-east of the district capital Hyderabad.

Masu Bhurgri is named after a Baloch tribe, Bhurgari, whose members live in several locations around Pakistan.

The town has schools, hospitals and around 100 shops. Its most famous place is Masu wari Khad.
