= Rizwan Ahmed (civil servant) =

Pakistani civil servant

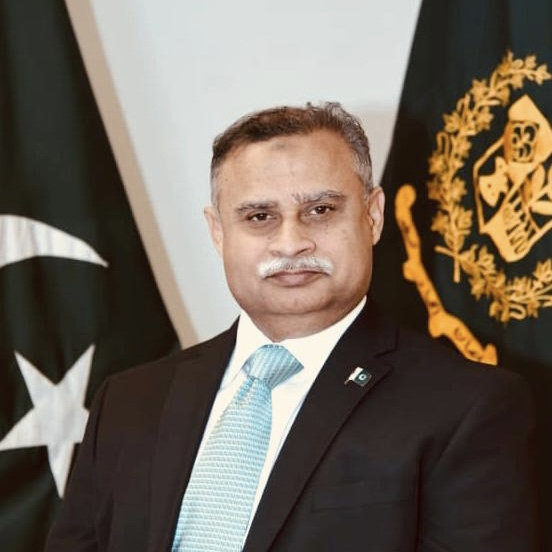

Chairman Sindh Public Service Commission Incumbent
- Appointed by: Governor of Sindh

Chairman & CEO Pakistan National Shipping Corporation
- Appointed by: Imran Khan

Maritime Secretary of Pakistan
- Appointed by: Imran Khan

Chairman & CEO Pakistan National Shipping Corporation
- Appointed by: Shahid Khaqan Abbasi

Additional Cabinet Secretary
- Appointed by: Nawaz Sharif

Additional Establishment Secretary
- Appointed by: Nawaz Sharif

Chairman & CEO Trading Corporation of Pakistan
- Appointed by: Nawaz Sharif

Managing Director Pakistan Security Printing Corporation
- Appointed by: Mir Hazar Khan Khoso

Health Secretary of Sindh
- Appointed by: Syed Qaim Ali Shah

Secretary to Governor Sindh
- Appointed by: Ishratul Ibad

Secretary General Administration Sindh
- Appointed by: Syed Qaim Ali Shah

Deputy Commissioner of Hyderabad
- Appointed by: Muhammad Mian Soomro

Personal details
- Born: Hyderabad, Sindh, Pakistan
- Relations: Jamil Ahmed (father); Haziqul Khairi (father-in-law); Sumaira Tazeen (sister)
- Education: Harvard University; Cadet College Petaro

Rizwan Ahmed (Urdu: رضوان احمد) is the current Chairman of Sindh Public Service Commission (SPSC) and a retired grade 22 officer of the Pakistan Administrative Service who held top government offices of Maritime Secretary of Pakistan, Chairman Trading Corporation of Pakistan (TCP), Chairman Pakistan National Shipping Corporation (PNSC) and Additional Establishment Secretary. He did his two-year Masters in Public Administration from Harvard University and holds the rare distinction of having served as the chief executive of four state-owned organisations under the Government of Pakistan, the most by any individual in history at the federal level.

He first came to the fore when he saved more than PKR 7 billion of the national exchequer through a sweeping anti-corruption drive and commodity financing operation during his tenure as Chairman of the Trading Corporation of Pakistan (TCP).

Rizwan held the high profile portfolio of Maritime Secretary of Pakistan for a period of almost three years, during which he also became the first ever Pakistani to be appointed as Chairman of INFOFISH, an intergovernmental organisation setup by the United Nations Food and Agriculture Organisation.

He is considered to be one of the most successful Chairman of the Pakistan National Shipping Corporation (PNSC), having extensively expanded the national fleet during his tenure which led to PNSC posting its highest ever profit of PKR 30 billion. He remains the only individual to have served twice as Chairman & CEO of PNSC.

Rizwan also served as Managing Director of the highly sensitive Pakistan Security Printing Corporation (PSPC) where he was responsible for the printing of currency banknotes, ballot papers for elections and other important documents including passports and national identity cards.

He is a Certified Director from the Pakistan Institute of Corporate Governance and remained a Teaching Fellow for Financial Management at the Harvard Kennedy School. He was promoted to the highest bureaucratic rank of grade 22 at the age of 55.

== Family and education ==
Rizwan is the son of Jamil Ahmed, the former twice-elected and longest-serving Mayor of Hyderabad; and is the son-in-law of former FSC Chief Justice Haziqul Khairi.

He received his early education from Cadet College Petaro and holds five academic degrees including a Masters in Public Administration from Harvard University, Masters in Social Sciences, Bachelor of Laws, Bachelor of Engineering (Electronics) and a Bachelor of Science.

== Career ==
Rizwan Ahmed joined the Pakistan Administrative Service (erstwhile DMG) in 1988 after passing the CSS examinations, and was first posted under the Government of the Punjab where he served in various capacities including as Director Local Government Bahawalpur Division and Assistant Commissioner of Rahim Yar Khan and Mianwali.

He then was transferred to the Government of Sindh where he served as Deputy Commissioner of Hyderabad - the then largest district in the province of Sindh. He also served as Secretary Sindh Local Government Board and Additional Home Secretary (Law Enforcement) after which he was promoted to the position of provincial secretary and held the assignments of Health Secretary of Sindh, Secretary General Administration (SGA&CD Sindh) and Secretary to Governor Sindh.

He then joined the Government of Pakistan where he held key assignments including that of Chairman Trading Corporation of Pakistan, Chairman Pakistan National Shipping Corporation, Managing Director Pakistan Security Printing Corporation, Additional Establishment Secretary and Additional Cabinet Secretary, before being elevated to the country's highest bureaucratic rank of Grade 22 and subsequently being appointed to the coveted office of Federal Secretary for Maritime Affairs where he was in charge of the country's seaports and national shipping. At the time of his retirement from active civil service, Rizwan Ahmed was one of the country's senior-most federal secretaries and was also a Member of the Central Selection Board.

After his retirement, he was appointed to the all-important constitutional office of Chairman Sindh Public Service Commission (SPSC). He was sworn in as Chairman SPSC by Governor Sindh on 13 June 2026.

== See also ==
- Fawad Hasan Fawad
- Naveed Kamran Baloch
- Sikandar Sultan Raja
