= Tamir Pardo =

Former head of Mossad (born 1953)

- תמיר פרדו
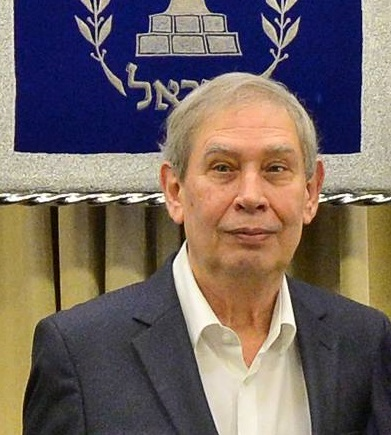
- Pardo in 2015

11th Director of Mossad
- In office January 1, 2011 – January 5, 2016
- Prime Minister: Benjamin Netanyahu
- Preceded by: Meir Dagan
- Succeeded by: Yossi Cohen

Personal details
- Born: 1953 (age 72–73) Tel Aviv, Israel
- Education: Tel Aviv University

Military service
- Allegiance: Israel
- Branch/service: Israel Defense Forces
- Years of service: 1971–present
- Battles/wars: Operation Entebbe

Tamir Pardo (Hebrew: תמיר פרדו; born 1953) is the former Director of Mossad, taking over the role from Meir Dagan on January 1, 2011. The appointment was announced by Israeli prime Minister Benjamin Netanyahu on November 29, 2010. He served in the role from 2011 until 2016.

Since he stepped down as Director of Mossad, he has been a vocal critic of Israeli prime minister Benjamin Netanyahu and his 2023 judicial reforms. He has called for Netanyahu to resign and stand trial on charges of engaging in a coup, and accused the Israeli government of overseeing an apartheid state. He has also accused Netanyahu of planning to directly attack Iran, and of spying on both himself and Benny Gantz, then chief of General Staff of the IDF.

== Biography ==
Pardo was born in Tel Aviv to a Sephardi-Jewish family. His father was an immigrant from Turkey, and his mother was of Serbian-Jewish origin. At age 18, when he began his compulsory service in the Israel Defense Forces, he volunteered for the paratroopers. He graduated from an officers' course, and later served as a communication officer in the elite special forces unit Sayeret Matkal. He also served in the Shaldag Unit. He was a member of the unit under the command of Yonatan "Yoni" Netanyahu and participated in Operation Entebbe. Netanyahu, elder brother to current Israeli Prime Minister Benjamin Netanyahu, was killed during the operation.

After completing his military service, Pardo joined the Mossad in 1980, and served in entry-level technical positions. He took part in several classified operations, and was awarded the Israel Security Prize three times. He rose through the ranks and eventually became head of the "Keshet" department, responsible for operations, including obtaining electronic intelligence through wiretaps and photographic methods. In 2005, he was in line for promotion to the organization's number 2 position, when another individual was given the job. Mossad Director-General Meir Dagan thereupon lent Pardo to the IDF, where he served as a senior advisor for operations to the Israeli General Staff. He served in this position during the 2006 Lebanon War. After Dagan fired his number 2, he invited Pardo to return to the Mossad and assume the role. Pardo did so in the belief that when Dagan retired, he would be offered the job. However, Dagan's term was extended and he did not retire when expected. This led Pardo to leave the Mossad, whereupon he went into private business with Israeli Internet gambling entrepreneur Noam Lanir, and to serve as chairman of Shizim Group.

=== Mossad leadership ===
Israeli media reported that Netanyahu's first candidate for the role of Mossad chief, Teva Pharmaceutical Industries's CEO, retired Major General Shlomo Yanai, was offered the job but turned it down. Of several other candidates, Pardo was the only one to have served in the Mossad. His choice may reflect a wish on the part of Prime Minister Netanyahu to signal continuity by choosing a candidate from within the ranks.

It was anticipated that Pardo would continue the work of his predecessor, Meir Dagan, in attempting to thwart any attempts by the government of the Islamic Republic of Iran to build a nuclear weapon.

On August 2, 2011, German news website Spiegel Online published an article named "Mossad Behind Tehran Assassinations, Says Source", claiming receiving information from "an Israeli intelligence source", linking Mossad under Tamir Pardo as its chief to the assassination of Iranian nuclear scientist Darioush Rezaeinejad in Tehran on July 23, 2011. The report was reprinted by several news agencies, yet without providing additional sources to confirm the information.

=== Post–Mossad ===
In June 2016, the American NGO United Against Nuclear Iran (UANI) announced that Pardo had joined the group's Advisory Board. Upon joining, Pardo said, "The leading global powers cannot turn a blind eye to the clear and present dangers the Iranian regime poses to the safety and freedoms of millions of people within their borders and throughout the world."

In addition, in 2016 Pardo founded together with Noam Erez, and Boaz Gorodiski XM Cyber, a company that developed a technology to help other companies improve their cyber defense by simulating organized cyber attacks.

During an interview with Haaretz in May 2018, Pardo said that in 2011 Netanyahu ordered the Mossad and IDF to prepare for an attack on Iran within 15 days, but he and Chief of Staff Benny Gantz questioned the Prime Minister's legal authority to give such an order without Cabinet approval, so Netanyahu backed off.

In June 2018 Pardo stated that Mossad was 'a crime organization with a license,' something which, he added, made working for it the 'fun part'.

On 6 September 2023 in a statement to the Associated Press, Pardo claimed that Israel is an apartheid state: “There is an apartheid state here. In a territory where two people are judged under two legal systems, that is an apartheid state." He also claimed that while Director of Mossad he saw the Israeli-Palestinian conflict as the most important threat to Israel, and "repeatedly warned Netanyahu that he needed to decide what Israel’s borders were, or risk the destruction of a state for the Jews."
