= Tando Hyder =

Coordinates: 25°23′0″N 68°26′0″E

- Union council
- Interactive map of Tando Hyder
- Country: Pakistan
- Province: Sindh
- District: Hyderabad District
- Tehsil: Hyderabad Taluka (rural)

Government
  - Chairman: Mansoor Azeem
  - Vice chairman: Muhammad Asif Khanzada

Tando Hyder is a town and union council of Hyderabad District in the Sindh province of Pakistan. It is part of the rural Taluka of Hyderabad and is located at 25°22'60N 68°25'60E and lies to the east of the capital Hyderabad.
