= List of educational institutions in Hyderabad, Sindh =

This is a list of educational institutions in Hyderabad, Sindh, Pakistan.

== Schools ==
.F.G Public No.1 Boys School Hyderabad Cantt

.Army Public School & College System Hyderabad Cantt

.Public school Latifabad Unit # 3 Latifabad, Hyderabad

== Colleges ==
- Government College

== Universities ==
- Government College University Hyderabad
- Hyderabad Institute for Technology and Management Sciences
- National University of Modern Languages, Hyderabad Campus
- Isra University
- Sindh Agriculture University, Hyderabad Campus
- SZABIST, Hyderabad Campus
