= Tayyab Hussain =

Syed Tayyab Hussain

6th Mayor of Hyderabad (Pakistan)
- In office August 30, 2016 – August 30, 2020
- Preceded by: Kunwar Naveed Jamil

National Assembly of Pakistan from NA-219 Hyderabad
- In office February 18, 2008 – May 12, 2013
- Preceded by: Khalid Wahab
- Succeeded by: Khalid Maqbool Siddiqui

Personal details
- Born: Hyderabad, Sindh, Pakistan
- Education: NED University

Tayyab Hussain (Urdu: طیب حسین) is the former Mayor of Hyderabad and former parliamentarian from the MQM of Pakistan. He is an Engineer by profession.

== National Assembly of Pakistan ==
Tayyab Hussain served as MQM's Parliamentarian from the constituency of NA-219 Hyderabad in 2008 - 2013.

== Mayor of Hyderabad ==
In 2016 Tayyab Hussain became the next Mayor of Hyderabad by overwhelming votes. He was elected as the next Hyderabad mayor after a gap of six years. He took oath as Mayor of Hyderabad on August 30, 2016.

== See also ==
- Mayor of Hyderabad
- NA 219 Hyderabad
- Khalid Maqbool Siddqui
