= Tando Jam =

Town in Sindh, Pakistan

Tando Jam ٹنڈو جام
- City
- Location within Sindh Location within Pakistan
- Coordinates: 25°25′40″N 68°31′40″E
- Country: Pakistan
- Province: Sindh
- District: Hyderabad
- Taluka: Hyderabad

Government
  - Type: Municipal Corporation

Area
  - City: 57.90 km^{2} (22.36 sq mi)
  - Urban: 7.14 km^{2} (2.76 sq mi)
  - Rural: 50.76 km^{2} (19.60 sq mi)
- Elevation: 22 m (72 ft)

Population (2023)
  - City: 74,303
  - Density: 1,283/km^{2} (3,324/sq mi)
- Time zone: UTC+5 (PST)
- Postal code: 70050, 70060
- Calling code: 022

Tando Jam (Urdu: ٹنڈو جام), (Sindhi: ٽنڊوڄام) is a town and a municipal committee of Hyderabad District in the Sindh province of Pakistan. It lies to the east of Hyderabad Taluka, about 12 kilometres northeast of the city center. As of 2023, its population is 75,303.

The Sindh Agriculture University is located within the town.

== Geography ==
Tamdo Jam is situated on the east of the Indus River. The Hyderabad-Murpurkhas Road passes through the town. Its average elevation is 22 metres above sea level.

== Climate ==
Tando Jam has a hot desert climate (BWh). Its monsoon season is from July to September. It sees the most rainfall in August, with an average precipitation of 39.2 mm; and the least amount of rainfall in November, with an average precipitation of 1.6 mm.

Climate data for Tando Jam
Month	Jan	Feb	Mar	Apr	May	Jun	Jul	Aug	Sep	Oct	Nov	Dec	Year
Mean daily maximum °C (°F)	24 (75)	28 (82)	33 (91)	39 (102)	41 (106)	40 (104)	37 (99)	35 (95)	36 (97)	36 (97)	31 (88)	26 (79)	34 (93)
Daily mean °C (°F)	18 (64)	21 (70)	26 (79)	31 (88)	33 (91)	33 (91)	32 (90)	31 (88)	30 (86)	29 (84)	24 (75)	19 (66)	27 (81)
Mean daily minimum °C (°F)	12 (54)	15 (59)	19 (66)	24 (75)	27 (81)	28 (82)	28 (82)	27 (81)	26 (79)	23 (73)	18 (64)	13 (55)	22 (71)
Average rainfall mm (inches)	2.1 (0.08)	1.8 (0.07)	3.3 (0.13)	2.8 (0.11)	2.3 (0.09)	6.7 (0.26)	28.9 (1.14)	39.2 (1.54)	18.4 (0.72)	2.5 (0.10)	1.6 (0.06)	2.4 (0.09)	112 (4.39)
Average rainy days (≥ 1 mm)	0.5	0.3	0.4	0.6	0.3	0.9	3.3	3.4	1.5	0.5	0.3	0.4	12.4
Mean daily daylight hours	10.8	11.3	12.0	12.8	13.4	13.7	13.5	13.0	12.3	11.5	10.9	10.6	12.1
Source: Weatherspark.com

== Villages ==
In 2017, there are 4 villages under the administration of Tando Jam Municipal Committee, constituting 45.82% of its total population. They are listed as follows:

Villages	Population (2017)	Area (km^{2})
Abri	11,569	21.65
Bhimpur	5,630	7.36
Rais	4,414	6.52
Sipki	11,265	15.24

Village Haji Muhammad Saleh Baloch

== Demographics ==
Population

Historical population
Year	Pop.	±%
1972	11,702	—
1981	17,301	+47.8%
1998	26,446	+52.9%
2017	71,760	+171.3%
2023	74,303	+3.5%

In 2023 census Tando Jam city has a population of 74,303.

According to the 2017 Pakistani Census there are a total of 71,760 residents within Tando Jam, with 37,760 males, 33,994 females, and 6 transgender people. The average household size is 5.20. Among the rural localities, the total literacy rate is 40.47%, with 51.94% of the male population and 27.96% of the female population being literate.

Languages

Languages of Tando Jam city (2023 Census)
1. Sindhi (59.3%)
2. Urdu (25.9%)
3. Pashto (3.80%)
4. Punjabi (3.00%)
5. Saraiki (2.90%)
6. Balochi (2.40%)
7. Others (2.70%)

Religions

Religion in rural localities of Tando Jam
Religion	Percent
Islam	83.16%
other	16.84%
