= Trading Corporation of Pakistan =

Pakistani state-owned commodity trading company

- Native name: شرکت تجارتی پاکستان
- Industry: Trading Industry
- Genre: Corporation
- Founded: July 1967
- Headquarters: Karachi, Pakistan
- Net income: PKR 1.4 billion (2020)
- Owner: Government of Pakistan
- Number of employees: 632 TCP
- Parent: Ministry of Commerce
- Website: tcp.gov.pk

The Trading Corporation of Pakistan (TCP) is a Pakistani state-owned commodity trading company, mainly responsible for export and import of commodities particularly wheat, cotton, rice and urea. It also issues tenders on behalf of the Government of Pakistan for export and import of agricultural products. TCP has its headquarters in Karachi, and offices in various cities of the country including Islamabad and Multan.

Trading Corporation of Pakistan was established in 1967 as a premier international trading house fully owned by the Government of Pakistan. From the year 1980-81, the government decided to remove the monopoly of TCP on imports of the country. The Corporation has gone through substantial change over the years in its role from barter to commodity exchange arrangement and to trade in line with free market economy approach adopted by the Government of Pakistan. TCP's current role of import of essential commodities is for improving supplies to ensure availability of commodities to consumers at affordable prices and market intervention for ensuring fair price to farmers. The shares of the Corporation are owned by the Ministry of Commerce, Government of Pakistan.

TCP is one of Pakistan's most evident profit making public enterprise. Beginning rather modestly with trade worth around Rs115.763 million in FY 1967–8, TCP registered a turnover of Rs45.16bn and booked after–tax profits worth Rs1.63bn in FY 2009–10. During the period of July 2013 – May 2017, the Trading Corporation of Pakistan emerged as one of the most transparent organisation in the country's public sector with a record amount of Rs7.109bn saved and recovered in the FY 2014–15. The total amount saved by TCP through its commodity financing operations in this near four-year time period was Rs7.8bn.

A senior civil servant is appointed by the Prime Minister as Chairman of the Trading Corporation. Five directors are appointed for the oversight of finance, planning and procurement, sales and stores, port operations and logistics functions; each of whom reports directly to the Chairman. Besides these, general managers of internal audit, legal, general administration and human resources as well as the general manager of the regional office in Islamabad report directly to the Chairman TCP. In all, the corporation employs 632 members, according to the official website of TCP, including 478 staffers. In 2016, The Express Tribune, a major daily English-language newspaper based in Pakistan, reported that the Trading Corporation is one of the highest paid government departments in the country.

== See also ==
- Government of Pakistan
- Economy of Pakistan
- Fazalur Rehman
- Rizwan Ahmed
- Trade Development Authority of Pakistan
- State Life Insurance Corporation
