= Jamil Ahmed =

Pakistani politician

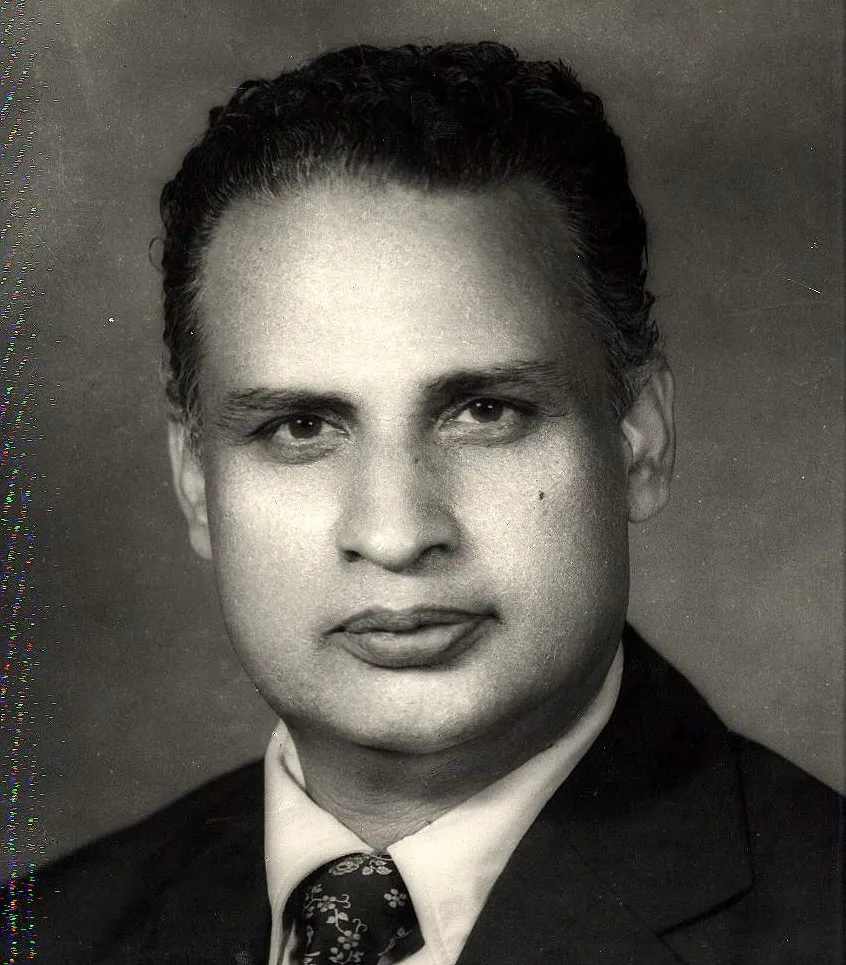

Mayor of Hyderabad
- Incumbent
- Assumed office 1962 — 1971

Personal details
- Born: 1928
- Died: 1997 (aged 68–69)
- Children: Rizwan Ahmed (son); Sumaira Tazeen (daughter)

Jamil Ahmed (1928-1997) was a Pakistani politician, agriculturist and the longest-serving Mayor of Hyderabad, in office from 1962 to 1971, having won the mayoral elections twice consecutively. He also remained President of the Hyderabad Chamber of Commerce (HYDCCI). He was father of senior bureaucrat Rizwan Ahmed and artist Sumaira Tazeen.

Jamil Ahmed left behind a respected legacy as the Mayor of Hyderabad. His son, Rizwan Ahmed, also served Hyderabad District as a Deputy Commissioner/District Collector.

== See also ==
- Hyderabad, Sindh
