= Ribbon Communications =

American communications software company

- Traded as: Nasdaq: RBBN; Russell 2000 Component
- Industry: Telecommunications
- Predecessor: Genband; Sonus Networks
- Founded: 2017; 9 years ago
- Headquarters: Plano, Texas
- Key people: Bruce McClelland, CEO
- Products: Session Border Controllers; Media Gateways; Enhanced Voice Services; Cloud Communications; SIP Trunking; IP Networking; Optical Transport; (and related products)
- Revenue: ▲US$845 million (2025)
- Net income: ▲US$39.6 million (2025)
- Website: ribboncommunications.com

Ribbon Communications Inc. is a public company that makes software, IP and optical networking solutions for service providers, enterprises and critical infrastructure sectors. The company was formed in 2017, following the merger of Genband and Sonus Networks and is headquartered in Plano, Texas.

== History ==
Ribbon Communications was the combination of two companies, each of which had acquired other businesses over their history.

=== Ribbon Communications ===
Ribbon Communications was founded in October 2017, following the merger of Genband and Sonus Networks in May. Ray Dolan initially headed the combined company, while Walsh led the Kandy business unit. By December, Dolan, who had led Sonus since 2010, resigned. Franklin (Fritz) W. Hobbs was appointed as president and CEO of the combined organization and served in that role until November 2019.

In January 2018, the company announced that its session border controllers would be used in the virtual network services of Verizon. In 2018 Ribbon also acquired Edgewater Networks.

In November 2019, Ribbon announced it would acquire ECI Telecom from Shaul Shani for $486 million in cash and stock. The company completed the merger in March 2020.

In February 2020, Bruce McClelland was named president, CEO and director. A year later, Ribbon moved its headquarters to Plano, Texas.

In August 2020, AVCTechnologies announced an agreement to buy Kandy Communications Business.

=== Genband ===
General Bandwidth was founded in 1999 by Paul Carew, Brendon Mills, Ron Lutz and Steve Raich in Austin, Texas, and received initial venture capital funding of $12 million. The company raised over $200 million in four rounds of venture funding and grew to over 200 people by 2003. In 2004, Mills resigned and was replaced as CEO by Charles Vogt.

In March 2006, General Bandwidth changed its name to Genband, Inc. and moved its headquarters to Plano, Texas. Genband started as a media gateway vendor selling the G6 media gateway, but eventually branched out to IP switching, IP applications, IP Multimedia Subsystem and session border controllers. In August 2006, Genband acquired Syndeo and Baypackets (headquartered in Fremont, California, with employees mostly in India). In October 2006, it acquired the digital central office products known as Siemens DCO.

In 2007, Genband acquired Tekelec's switching group, which expanded product offerings in application software and SIP trunking gateways. In 2008, the company acquired Nokia Siemens Networks’ Surpass HiG media gateway product portfolio, including fixed-line trunking media gateways. The company concluded 2008 with the acquisition of NextPoint Networks, which included session border controller (SBCs) and security gateway offerings.

In May 2010, Genband purchased Nortel Networks' carrier VoIP and application business for an estimated net $182 million after Nortel became bankrupt. Existing shareholder One Equity Partners assisted in financing. In June 2010, Genband was re-incorporated as Genband, Inc, and disclosed an equity investment from executives and board members of about $4 million. In December 2010, it moved its headquarters to Frisco, Texas, keeping its Plano campus as a design center. Both are near Dallas, Texas. In January 2011, Genband acquired Cedar Point Communications in Derry, New Hampshire.

In 2012, Genband acquired Aztek Networks, a switch maker specializing in hardware that allows for a smoother transition from legacy to IP networks. Genband was named the top-ventured capital backed company by the Wall Street Journal out of nearly 6,000 companies that were considered.

On February 12, 2013, Genband announced the launch of the NUViA Cloud offering which was their entry into the SaaS market. The NUViA Unified Communications as a Service (UCaaS) offering included HD voice, video, multimedia messaging, mobility, conferencing, Web collaboration, desktop clients, and fixed and mobile convergence hosted from datacenters run by the company around the globe.

Also in 2013, Genband acquired Fringland Ltd., provider of the Fring! app, an over-the-top (OTT) mobile IP communications service provider. Two years later, it announced the Fring Alliance, a community promoting communications service providers to provide instant messaging, voice and video services to their subscribers. Charles Vogt left Genband in 2013 and David Walsh added the CEO position to his other already held title of chairman.

In 2014, Genband acquired uReach Technologies, a provider of unified communications and messaging, and introduced unified communications products and services for business customers.

In September 2014, Genband announced Kandy.io, cloud-based, real-time software support communications marketed as platform as a service (PaaS).

In May 2015, Genband was named in CNBC's "disruptor" list. In 2016, it was involved in a patent dispute with Metaswitch. In September 2016, pre-packaged software using the Kandy technology were announced, called "Kandy wrappers".

=== Sonus Networks ===
Sonus Networks, Inc. was founded in August 1997 by Jay Pasco-Anderson, Karl Schwiegershausen, Michael G. Hluchyj, Rubin Gruber and Tony Risica. Hluchyj was chief technology officer, Gruber served as president until November 1998, when Hassan M. Ahmed became CEO and chairman. There were no revenues until the quarter ending in March 2000, with accumulated losses of about $50 million against $1.1 million revenues.

On May 31, 2000, Sonus had its initial public offering (IPO), raising over $100 million. It was listed on Nasdaq with the symbol SONS. At the time (near the end of the dot-com bubble), it was located in Westford, Massachusetts.

In January 2001, Sonus acquired Anousheh Ansari's firm Telecom Technologies, Inc., in an all-stock deal. Sonus subsequently integrated TTI's soft switch technology INtelligentIP into its own packet telephony suite. In 2008, Richard Nottenburg joined as chief executive. A product called a network border switch was announced in 2003, and updated in 2006.

In August 2012, Sonus acquired Network Equipment Technologies, Inc., for approximately $42 million. The acquisition complemented their existing SBC line with the NET UX series for SIP Trunking and SIP-based UC.

On December 13, 2013, Sonus agreed to acquire Performance Technologies Inc., entering into a definitive merger agreement under which Sonus would acquire PT for $3.75 per share in cash, or approximately $30 million.[6] In 2014 Sonus acquired Performance Technologies, moving into the diameter signaling market.

In 2016 Sonus Networks Inc., acquired Taqua expanding its soft switching portfolio.

== Kandy ==
Kandy is a cloud communications platform created by Genband in September 2014.

Kandy was formed when GENBAND announced the launch of its real-time software development communications platform in September 2014. Initially only focused on CPaaS, the scope of the platform was quickly expanded to include GENBAND's Nuvia UCaaS offer, rebranded Kandy Business Solutions (KBS). After the 2017 merger Ribbon Communications maintained the Kandy offerings and Kandy sub brand for its cloud portfolio.

On December 2, 2020, Ribbon Communications sold the Kandy assets to AVCtechnologies. AVCT issued to Ribbon units of securities consisting of convertible debentures in an aggregate principal amount of approximately $45 million and warrants to purchase an aggregate of approximately 4.5 million shares of AVCT's common stock for an exercise price of $0.01 per share. On January 11, 2023, American Virtual Cloud and all of its affiliated subsidiaries, including AVCtechnologies and Kandy Communications, declared Chapter 11 bankruptcy. The company will continue to operate normally as 'debtors-in-possession'.
