= Sumaira Tazeen =

Sumaira Tazeen سمیرا تزین
- Born: 1973; Hyderabad, Pakistan
- Education: National College of Arts
- Occupations: Artist miniature painter educationist
- Relatives: Jamil Ahmed (father); Rizwan Ahmed (brother)

Sumaira Tazeen (Urdu: سمیرا تزین) is a Canada-based Pakistani artist who specializes in contemporary miniature art. A gold medalist from National College of Arts, Tazeen has presented her work to various influential personalities around the world including Queen Elizabeth II (1997), Pakistani President Pervez Musharraf (2006) and Queen Rania of Jordan.

== Education ==
After early schooling in Hyderabad, Tazeen did her Bachelor of Fine Arts from the National College of Arts (NCA) in Lahore, specializing in miniature painting. At NCA, she received a gold medal for outstanding student and the Haji Mohammad Sharif Award for Miniature Painting.

== Career ==
Known as a master of traditional gilding technique, Tazeen has conducted various workshops at institutions including the Aga Khan Museum in Toronto and at the Art Gallery of Mississauga. Tazeen's solo exhibitions as well as selected group exhibitions have taken place across the world including New York City, London, Amman, Milan, Mississauga, Dhaka, Lahore and Karachi. She taught at the Indus Valley School of Art and Architecture, Karachi, as assistant professor in the department of Miniature Painting from 2005 to 2012. Other notable contributions include her role as a colour consultant and textile designer for Gul Ahmed Textile, illustrator for Oxford University Press in Karachi and preparing miniatures for Sindh Governor House.

== See also ==
- Contemporary art
- National College of Arts
