= ECI Telecom =

Company in Petah Tikva, Israel

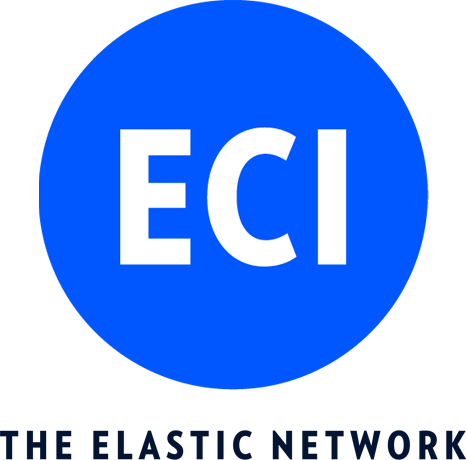
- Type: Private
- Industry: Networking Hardware
- Founded: 1961; 65 years ago
- Headquarters: Petah Tikva, Israel
- Products: Transport, Carrier Ethernet, SDN/NFV, Network Management Systems, Services
- Website: http://www.ecitele.com

ECI Telecom Ltd is an Israel-based manufacturer of telecommunications equipment that provides packet optical transport products, software-defined networking applications, cybersecurity and professional services.

== History ==
The Electronics Corporation of Israel (ECI) was founded in 1961. It specialized in telephone transmission products that manipulated the signals carried on telephone lines. The Electronics Corporation of Israel became ECI Telecom in 1981, and had its first trading on NASDAQ in 1982. Since that time, ECI has undergone a number of mergers and acquisitions. An acquisition in 2007 by the Swarth Group and the Ashmore Group, private equity firms, making ECI a private company once again.

In 2005, the firm purchased Laurel Networks, a company that specialized in routers for telecommunications carriers, for $88M, and formally renamed it as the Data Networking Division within ECI.

In November 2019, Ribbon Communications agreed to acquire ECI Telecom, through a merger, for $486 million.

ECI serves carriers and service providers in various sectors: cable/multiple system operators, wireless/cellular service providers, utilities, carrier of carriers, data centers, government and defense entities. It markets multi-play services, business services, voice services, cellular backhaul, utility telco and network security.

Facebook in its phase five has given transport core network deployment to Ciena and worldwide metro packet network deployment to ECI telecom which will be completed by 2022.

ECI has over 3,000 employees with offices in over 20 countries and development centers in India, China, and Israel.

== Former holdings and spin-offs ==
- ECtel - provider of revenue assurance software sold to cVidya in 2010.
- Veraz Networks - provider of Softswitch technology merged with NexVerse Networks to form a new company called Veraz Networks in 2002.
- InnoWave ECI Wireless Systems Ltd - sold to Alvarion in 2003
- Celtro communication Ltd - provider of cellular network Backhaul (telecommunications) optimization and compression technology, worked as an independent business unit within the NGTS division was spun off to a private investor group led by the Momentum Venture Management fund in 2003.

== See also ==
- Economy of Israel
