= Kunwar Naveed Jamil =

Pakistani politician (1964–2023)

- کنور نوید جمیل
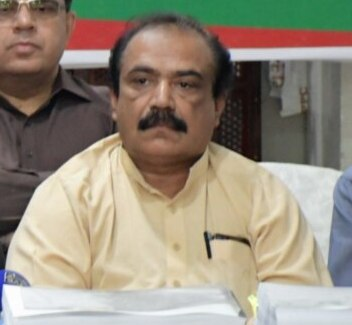
- Jamil in 2019

Member of the Provincial Assembly of Sindh
- In office 13 August 2018 – 11 August 2023
- Constituency: PS-127 (Karachi Central-V)
- In office 2002–2005
- Constituency: PS-106 (Karachi-XVIII)

Member of the National Assembly of Pakistan
- In office 29 April 2015 – 31 May 2018
- Constituency: NA-246 (Karachi-VIII)

5th Mayor of Hyderabad
- In office 17 October 2005 – 17 February 2010
- Preceded by: Dr Makhdoom Rafik Zaman
- Succeeded by: Tayyab Hussain

Personal details
- Born: 15 March 1964
- Died: 17 August 2023 (aged 59) Karachi, Sindh, Pakistan
- Party: MQM (2006-2023)

Kunwar Naveed Jamil (Urdu: کنور نوید جمیل; 15 March 1964 – 17 August 2023) was a Pakistani politician who had been a member of the Provincial Assembly of Sindh from August 2018 to August 2023. Previously, he had been a member of the National Assembly of Pakistan from April 2015 to May 2018.

== Education ==
Jamil held the degrees of Bachelor of Laws and Bachelor of Science.

== Political career ==
Jamil was elected to the Provincial Assembly of Sindh as a candidate of Muttahida Qaumi Movement (MQM) from Constituency PS-106 (Karachi-XVIII) in the 2002 Pakistani general election. He received 24,581 votes and defeated Islamuddin Ayubi, a candidate of Muttahida Majlis-e-Amal (MMA). In November 2005, he resigned from the Provincial Assembly of Sindh.

In November 2005, he was elected as the mayor of district Hyderabad.

Jamil was elected to the National Assembly of Pakistan as a candidate of MQM from Constituency NA-246 (Karachi-VIII) in a by-election held in 2015. He received 95,644 votes and defeated Imran Ismail, a candidate of Pakistan Tehreek-e-Insaf (PTI).

Jamil was re-elected to Provincial Assembly of Sindh as a candidate of MQM from Constituency PS-127 (Karachi Central-V) in the 2018 Pakistani general election.

== Death ==
Kunwar Naveed Jamil died in Karachi on 17 August 2023, at the age of 59. He had suffered a brain hemorrhage in June and was admitted to a local hospital.
