= Ganjo Takkar =

Ganjo Takkar (Barren Hill) or the Ganjo Hills, is a small limestone range in Hyderabad District, Sindh, Pakistan that runs nearly due south parallel to the Indus for about 14 miles. The hills have an elevation just 100 feet and a type of fuller's earth, was dug from mines in the hills.
