= Moolan =

Coordinates: 25.4667°N 68.4000°E

Husri
- Union council
- Interactive map of Husri
- Country: Pakistan
- Province: Sindh
- District: Hyderabad District
- Tehsil: Hyderabad Taluka (rural)

Government
  - Nazim: Muhammad Thebo
  - Naib Nazim: Shafqat Ali

Moolan is a town and union council of Hyderabad District in the Sindh province of Pakistan. It is part of the rural Taluka of Hyderabad.
