= Disney Channel Original =

Disney Channel Original may refer to:

- Disney Channel Original Movie
- Disney Channel Original Series
