= Qasimabad Tehsil =

Administrative area in Sindh, Pakistan

Qasimabad قاسم آباد تعلقو بلدیہ اعلی
- Tehsil
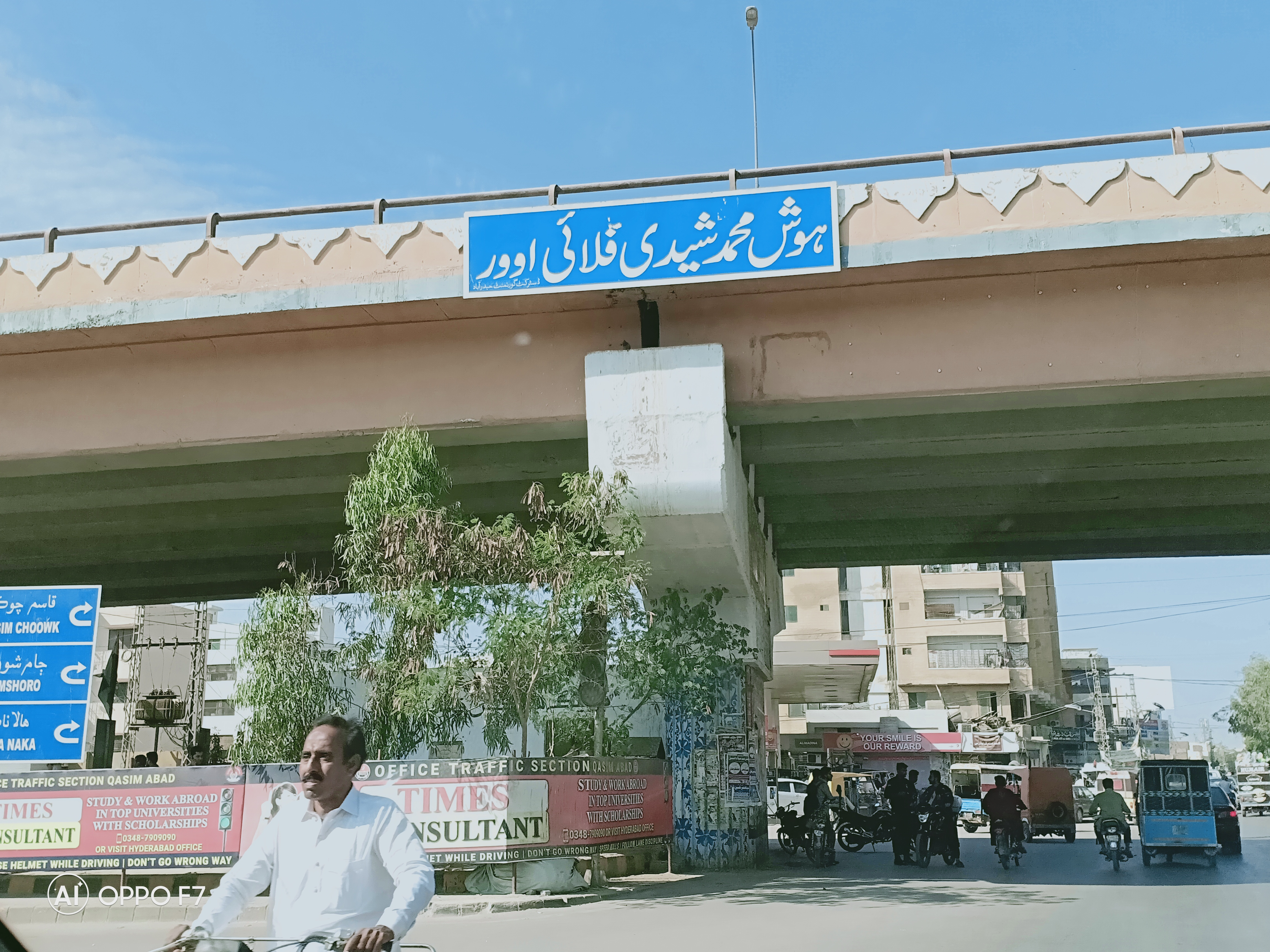
- Country: Pakistan
- Province: Sindh
- District: Hyderabad District

Government
  - Municipal Chairman: Mr. Abdul Ghafoor Dars
  - Municipal Vice Chairman: Mr. Abdul sattar Soomro

Population (2017)
  - Total: 304,899
- Time zone: UTC+5 (PST)
- Number of Wards: 27

Qasimabad Tehsil (Sindhi: قاسم آباد تعلقو) is an administrative subdivision (tehsil) of Hyderabad District in the Sindh province of Pakistan.

== Administration ==
The Taluka of Qasimabad is administratively subdivided into 27 municipal committees. The population is more than 99% the Sindhi people.

Current Administration:

Assistant Commissioner: Hataf Siyal

Mukhtiarkar: Farhan Jatoi

TMC Chairman: Abdul Ghafoor Dars
