= CVidya =

Big data analytics company

cVidya Networks
- Company type: Private
- Industry: Telecommunication, Services, Consulting, Revenue Management, Revenue Assurance, Fraud Management, Dealer management
- Founded: 2000
- Founder: Alon Aginsky
- Headquarters: Plantation, United States
- Number of employees: 300 (2010)
- Website: www.cvidya.com

cVidya Networks is a provider of big data analytics products for communications and digital service providers. cVidya's market includes business protection and business growth, including revenue assurance, fraud management, marketing analytics and data monetization. The company has 300 employees in 18 countries and has over 150 customers. cVidya's investors include Battery Ventures, Carmel Ventures, Hyperion, StageOne, Saints Capital and Plenus.

== History ==
cVidya was founded in 2000 by Israeli businessman Alon Aginsky in the US and saw projects at Telecom Italia and Bezeq within its first years.

Between 2004–2010 cVidya became one of the leading vendors in the Revenue Assurance domain with the MoneyMap product suite, with their entrance into Europe followed closely by LATAM, APAC, North America and Africa.

In 2009, cVidya's acquired ECtel for $20.5 million. By acquiring the larger, publicly traded company and consolidating their product portfolios cVidya added the FraudView fraud management product. In 2010, cVidya announced the addition of Cloud capabilities. In 2011, cVidya added risk management product and announced revenue assurance and fraud management eLearning courses. In that same year, Gartner ranked cVidya as a market leader. In 2012, cVidya added big data analytics capabilities and in 2013 a marketing analytics suite.

In January 2016, the company was bought by Amdocs for 30 million dollars.
