= Siemens DCO =

The Siemens DCO (digital central office) electronic telephone switch was introduced in 1977 by Stromberg-Carlson, having been conceived by its new president, Leonard A. Muller, an ex IBM senior executive who infused Stromberg with his new digital awareness learned in IBM. In a revolutionary project headed by lead engineer and chief of project development, Mick Richmond, the Stromberg-Carlson DCO was one of the first digital class 5 telephone switches ever installed in the World's telecommunications network, Muller was quick to recognize the value digital technology brought to the science of electronic switching and commenced a major digital development program shortly after taking over management of Stromberg in 1974. Stromberg-Carlson put their switch into service in July 1977 in a telephone exchange in Richmond Hill, Georgia.

The DCO came as DCO-SE (Digital Central Office - Small Exchange) for line side Central Office operation and the DCO-CS (DCO-Carrier Switch) for Long Distance carrier services. A few DCO's were created for the cellular phone networks, but this was very limited.

In 1990 Siemens purchased Stromberg Carlson and moved its EWSD production to the Lake Mary, Florida production facility in 1991. In the next few years Siemens slowly phased out the DCO as a line side central office switch. The DCO-CS was continued through the 1990s to support regional LD companies. The DCO-CS was small on port capacity (just under 10,000), but was robust on features, more than most other carrier switches.

As the 1990s came to a close, many regional long distance companies were being bought up, or going out of business as their profitability had diminished. This also brought an end to DCO production as Siemens-Stromberg Carlson focused on marketing the EWSD.

In 2006 the entire Siemens DCO line was sold to Genband, originally a VoIP gateway / softswitch company from Texas, USA.
