= Swarth Group =

Israeli private equity company

Swarth Group is a private equity company, owned by Israeli investor Shaul Shani. In 2007, it purchased Israeli ECI Telecom for $1.24 billion. The company headquarters are in Petah Tikva, Israel. The company specialises in Telecoms. In 2008, it acquired a 16.44% share of GVT Holding, which owns GVT Holland, and itself owns 22.9% of Brazilian telecom firm Global Village Telecom. The stake was purchased from Nochi Dankner's Discount Investment Corporation Ltd. In 2009 Swarth group sold its holding in GVT to Vivendi the deal reflects a 15.8% premium on the price paid for it by Swarth in 2008.
