= Dynamic creative optimization =

Dynamic creative optimization (DCO), is a form of programmatic advertising that allows advertisers to optimize the performance of their creative using real-time technology.

In DCO, a variety of ad components (backgrounds, main images, text, value propositions, call to action, etc.) are dynamically assembled on the flight, when the ad is served, according to the particular needs of the impression. Creative development is done using creative studio tools like Adobe Photoshop. It may include video, animation, native components, and interactive elements.

While the actual optimization approaches may vary, they almost always involve the use of multivariate testing. The DCO process consists of creative development, identification of test variables, definition of the optimization objective, and method of optimization. Test variables represent the parts of the ad creative that are varied in the multivariate testing framework. These commonly include graphical elements, ad copy, colors, and click-through actions. It is helpful to have digital assets managed in a digital asset management system, especially when digital rights need to be enforced. The optimization objective can be initial engagement, a user action (such as click or install), or a post-install metric (such as purchase, registration, or lifetime value). Optimization of this objective is carried out using some form of discrete or combinatorial optimization.

== Dynamic versus static ==
Most campaign creatives are optimized statically, i.e., a few alternate ad creatives are developed and then tested using a split sample to select the best performing creative. This process ignores many factors (such as time-of-day, day-of-week, seasonality, geographical region, and inherent variations in user preference) that may play a significant role in the performance of the creative. By adjusting the optimal solution dynamically, DCO can account for all these factors making the optimization process more accurate and stable.
