= Hatri =

Coordinates: 25°28′0″N 68°24′0″E

- Union council
- Interactive map of Hatri
- Country: Pakistan
- Province: Sindh
- District: Hyderabad District

Government
  - Nazim: Khanwand Bux Alais Ghulam Muhammad
  - Naib Nazim: Muhammad Sharif Dahri

Population
  - Total: 29,719

Hatri is a union council of Hyderabad Taluka (rural) in the Sindh province of Pakistan. As of 2007, it has a population of 29,719, and is located at 25°28'0N 68°24'0E lying to the north-east of the district capital Hyderabad. Gul Hassan Chhalgri is located inside the council.
