= Latifabad Tehsil =

Pakistani administrative area

- Tehsil
- Country: Pakistan
- Province: Sindh
- District: Hyderabad District

Area
  - Total: 204 km^{2} (79 sq mi)

Population (2023)
  - Total: 800,983
  - Density: 3,930/km^{2} (10,200/sq mi)
- Time zone: UTC+5 (PST)

Latifabad Tehsil is an administrative subdivision (taluka) of Hyderabad District in the Sindh province of Pakistan. The city of Latifabad is the headquarters of the subdivision.

== Demographics ==
Religions in Latifabad taluk (2023)
Religion	Percent
Islam	93.82%
Hinduism	4.74%
Christianity	1.37%
Other or not stated	0.07%

As of the 2023 census, Latifabad Taluka has 153,348 households and a population of 800,983. The district has a sex ratio of 111.62 males to 100 females and a literacy rate of 74.04%: 76.85% for males and 70.90% for females. 224,490 (28.03% of the surveyed population) are under 10 years of age. The entire population lives in urban areas.

Languages of Latifabad taluk (2023)
1. Urdu (65.0%)
2. Sindhi (18.3%)
3. Pashto (5.83%)
4. Punjabi (4.69%)
5. 'Others' (2.48%)
6. Balochi (1.04%)
7. Saraiki (1.01%)
8. Others (1.61%)

At the time of the 2023 census, 65.05% of the population spoke Urdu, 18.29% Sindhi, 5.83% Pashto, 4.69% Punjabi, 1.04% Balochi and 1.01% Saraiki as their first language. 2.48% of the population spoke languages classified as 'Others' as their first language. Muhajirs arrived in Hyderabad after Partition.
