= Sindh Agriculture University =

University in Tando Jam, Pakistan

Sindh Agriculture University, Tandojam
- (Sindhi: سنڌ زرعي يونيورسٽي ٽنڊو ڄام)
- Sindh Agriculture University.
- Motto: Sustainable Agriculture for Food Security
- Type: Public Sector University
- Established: 1 March 1977
- Affiliations: Higher Education Commission and Pakistan Engineering Council
- Vice-Chancellor: Fateh Muhammad Marri
- Undergraduates: 6000+
- Postgraduates: 1500+
- Doctoral students: 100+
- Location: Tandojam, Hyderabad, Sindh, Pakistan; 25°25′35.68″N 68°32′22.31″E
- Campus: Rural
- Colours: Green and white
- Website: sau.edu.pk

Sindh Agriculture University (Sindhi: سنڌ زرعي يونيورسٽي ٽنڊو ڄام) is a Pakistani university located in Tando Jam town of Hyderabad, on Hyderabad-Mirpurkhas highway. It is about 200 km (120 mi) from Karachi's Jinnah International Airport, linked with Super Highway to Hyderabad.

== Recognized university ==
Sindh Agriculture University is ranked 3rd best agriculture university in Pakistan by the Higher Education Commission.

The university is an academic complex of five faculties (Faculty of Crop Production, Faculty of Crop Protection, Faculty of Agricultural Social Sciences, Faculty of Agricultural Engineering and Faculty of Animal Husbandry and Veterinary Sciences). Two institutes (Information Technology Centre and Institute of Food Sciences and Technology ). Three affiliated colleges (Sub Campus Umarkot, Shaheed Z.A.Bhutto Agriculture College Dokri and The Khairpur College of Agricultural Engineering and Technology) and Directorate of Advanced Studies and Research. The five faculties are majoring in almost 41 departments. These include the Doctor of Veterinary Medicine (D.V.M), Bachelor of Engineering in Agriculture (B.E.Agriculture), Bachelor of Science (Agriculture Honours) . and Bachelor of Science Information Technology (BS-IT Honours). The university offers postgraduate programmes leading to the award of M.S/ME and MS-IT in Animal Husbandry and Veterinary Sciences, Agricultural Engineering and Information Technology and in all the above-mentioned disciplines of Agriculture. M.Phil. and Ph.D. degree programmes are also offered in selected subject areas where trained staff and other facilities are available.

== Geography ==
The total area covered by the university is 416.66 acres (1.6862 km^{2}) including an area of more than 80 acres occupied by residential and non-residential buildings of the university, Agricultural Research Institute, Nuclear Institute of Agriculture, Rural Academy, Agricultural Engineering Workshop, Drainage Research Centre, and Central Veterinary Diagnostic Laboratory.

== Faculties ==
A modest number of short courses and training programmes are regularly offered to meet the continuing and in service education needs of Agriculture Officers, Field Assistants, Bank Officials, Agricultural Technicians, Progressive Farmers, Small Farmers, Tenants, Gardeners, Housewives and other clientele groups.

Faculty of Crop Production

- Department of Soil Science.
- Department of Agronomy.
- Department of Horticulture.
- Department of Plant Breeding & Genetics.
- Department of Biotechnology.
- Department of Crop Physiology.

Faculty of Crop Protection

- Department of Entomology.
- Department of Plant Pathology.
- Department of Plant Protection.

Faculty of Agriculture Social Sciences

- Department of Agriculture Economics.
- Department of Agriculture Extensions.
- Department of Rural Sociology.
- Department of Statistics.
- Department of English.
- Department of Islamic Studies.
- Department of Studies.

Faculty of Agriculture Engineering

- Department of Irrigation and Drainage.
- Department of Farm Power and Machinery.
- Department of Land and Water Management
- Department of Farm Structure.
- Department of Energy and Environment.
- Department of Basic Engineering.

Faculty of Animal Husbandry and Veterinary Sciences (AVHS)

- Department of Veterinary Medicine
- Department of Veterinary Pathology
- Department of Veterinary Parasitology
- Department of Veterinary Pharmacology
- Department of Veterinary Microbiology
- Department of Veterinary Anatomy & Histology
- Department of Veterinary Physiology & Biochemistry
- Department of Animal Nutrition
- Department of Poultry Husbandry
- Department of Animal Reproduction
- Department of Livestock Management
- Department of Surgery & Obstetrics
- Department of Animal Products Technology
- Department of Animal Breeding & Genetics

Information Technology Centre

- Information Technology
- Software Engineering
- Computer Science
- Artificial Intelligence

Institute of Food Sciences and Technology

- List of Islamic educational institutions
