= Hyderabad City Tehsil =

Coordinates: 25.3792°N 68.3683°E

- Tehsil
- حيدرآباد شھر تعلقو
- Country: Pakistan
- Province: Sindh
- District: Hyderabad District

Government
  - Assistant Commissioner: Babar Saleh Rahupoto

Population (2017)
  - Total: 755,290
- Time zone: UTC+5 (PST)
- Number of Union Councils: 20

Hyderabad City Tehsil (Sindhi : حيدرآباد شھر تعلقو) is an administrative subdivision (tehsil) of Hyderabad District in the Sindh province of Pakistan. Hyderabad district is subdivided into 4 tehsils or talukas, the urban area around the capital Hyderabad is part of Hyderabad City Taluka.

== Administration ==
The Taluka of Hyderabad city is administratively subdivided into 11 Union Councils.

== History ==
During British rule the city of Hyderabad, Sindh became the headquarters of Hyderabad Taluka - and for a time was part of the Bombay Presidency of British India.

The Imperial Gazetteer of India, written over a century ago during British rule, describes the taluka as follows:

Hyderābād Tāluka.- Tāluka of Hyderābād District, Sind, Bombay, lying between 25°10' and 25°33' N. and 68°20' and 68°45' E., with an area of 398 square miles (1,030 km^{2}). It contains one town, HYDERĀBĀD (population, 69,378), the District and tāluka headquarters; and 98 villages. The population in 1901 was 138,021, compared with 122,507 in 1891. The density, 347 persons per square mile, is largely above the District average. Land revenue and cesses in 1903-4 amounted to about 200,000. A small limestone range, known as the Ganjo hills, runs nearly due south parallel to the Indus for about 14 miles (23 km). The tāluka is compact in shape, and produces bijra, green gram, wheat, and cotton. It is irrigated wholly by canals.

== Demographics ==
At the time of the 2017 Census of Pakistan, the distribution of the population of Hyderabad City Tehsil by first language was as follows:

- 48.2% Sindhi
- 35.8% Urdu
- 4.8% Punjabi
- 2.1% Pashto
- 1.3% Saraiki
- 0.7% Hindko
- 0.6% Balochi
- 0.3% Brahui
- 0.1% Kashmiri
- 3.3% Others

== See also ==
- Shiv temple, Hyderabad
