= Integrity360 =

Integrity360 is an Irish-headquartered cybersecurity services company founded in 2005 by entrepreneur Eoin Goulding. The company provides managed cybersecurity, incident response, cyber risk and assurance, penetration testing and other cybersecurity services to organisations in Europe, Africa and North America.

Since receiving investment from British private equity firm August Equity in 2021, Integrity360 has expanded through a series of acquisitions and international investments. By May 2026, The Times reported that the company employed more than 800 people, served more than 3,500 customers and expected revenue of approximately €220 million for 2026, compared with €37 million in 2021. The newspaper described Integrity360 as one of the three largest pure-play cybersecurity specialists in Europe.

Integrity360 is headquartered in Sandyford, Dublin, and operates offices and security operations facilities across multiple countries in Europe, Africa and North America.

== History ==
Integrity360 was founded in Ireland in 2005 by Eoin Goulding. The company initially developed as an independently funded cybersecurity services business and grew to annual turnover of approximately €40 million before receiving external investment.

In June 2021, London-based private equity firm August Equity made a strategic investment in Integrity360 as part of plans to expand the business internationally. Following the investment, technology executive Ian Brown became executive chairman and chief executive, while Goulding moved to the role of group president. Goulding subsequently became a non-executive director.

At the time of the investment, Integrity360 employed approximately 200 people and announced plans to expand through both recruitment and acquisitions, initially focusing on the United Kingdom and continental Europe.

The company's acquisition strategy subsequently expanded its presence across Europe, Africa and North America. The Times reported in 2026 that Integrity360 had acquired ten companies since the 2021 investment and had expanded from a predominantly Irish business into multiple international markets.

Revenue increased from approximately €37 million in 2021 to €157 million in 2024, according to The Times, which reported that the company was forecasting revenue of approximately €220 million for 2026.

== Acquisitions ==
Integrity360 has used acquisitions as part of its international expansion strategy. Acquisitions since the 2021 investment include:

=== 2022 ===
Caretower – In February 2022, Integrity360 acquired Caretower, a cybersecurity services company with operations in the United Kingdom and Bulgaria. The combined business was reported at the time to have annual revenues of approximately £70 million.

=== 2023 ===
Netsecure – In May 2023, Integrity360 acquired Swedish cybersecurity company Netsecure, establishing a presence in the Nordic region. Netsecure employed around 40 people at the time, taking the enlarged Integrity360 workforce to approximately 360 employees.

Advantio – In July 2023, Integrity360 acquired Advantio, a cybersecurity and payment security consultancy. The acquisition added approximately 115 employees and expanded Integrity360's operations across continental Europe.

=== 2024 ===
Grove Group – In August 2024, Integrity360 acquired South African cybersecurity and cloud services company Grove Group. The acquisition represented Integrity360's first expansion outside Europe and added approximately 50 employees.

Adsigo – In December 2024, Integrity360 acquired Adsigo, a cybersecurity and Payment Card Industry compliance consultancy operating from Germany and Switzerland. The acquisition expanded Integrity360 into the German, Austrian and Swiss markets.

=== 2025 ===
Nclose – In January 2025, Integrity360 acquired South African cybersecurity company Nclose. The deal expanded the company's presence in the African cybersecurity market and was reported to add approximately £15 million in group revenue.

Holiseum – In March 2025, Integrity360 acquired French cybersecurity company Holiseum, a specialist in operational technology and the security of industrial and critical infrastructure.

Redshift – In December 2025, Integrity360 acquired Johannesburg-based cybersecurity company Redshift. It was the company's third South African acquisition following Grove Group and Nclose.

Cresco – Later in December 2025, Integrity360 acquired Brussels-based cybersecurity company Cresco. The acquisition established a presence in Belgium and Luxembourg and included plans to develop Brussels as a regional services hub.

=== 2026 ===
Advantus360 – In January 2026, Integrity360 acquired Canadian cybersecurity services company Advantus360. The transaction established Integrity360's first operational presence in North America, with the acquired business based in Calgary and serving customers in Canada and the United States.

By May 2026, The Times reported that Integrity360 had completed ten acquisitions since 2021.

== Operations ==
Integrity360 is headquartered in Sandyford, Dublin. with offices also located in London, Stockholm, Sofia, Ludwigsburg, Madrid, Cape Town, Johannesburg, Kyiv, Rome, Vilnius and Paris.

The company operates across European, African and North American territories.

Integrity360 operates a network of Security Operations Centres (SOCs) used to deliver managed cybersecurity monitoring and response services.

In December 2025, The Irish Times reported that Integrity360's global security operations organisation employed approximately 200 people and operated facilities in:

- Dublin, Ireland
- Stockholm, Sweden
- Rome, Italy
- Sofia, Bulgaria
- Madrid, Spain
- Cape Town, South Africa
- Johannesburg, South Africa.

The company subsequently announced plans for additional security operations facilities in Chester - UK, Paris, Brussels and Canada.

By May 2026, Integrity360 employed more than 800 people and served more than 3,500 customers, according to The Times.

=== Services ===
Integrity360 provides cybersecurity services to private- and public-sector organisations.

Its activities include managed security services, managed detection and response, cybersecurity testing, incident response and digital forensics, governance risk and compliance, security consulting, payments compliance and cybersecurity technology services.

The company also provides simulated cyberattack and penetration-testing services intended to identify weaknesses in customers' technical and physical security controls.

Integrity360 has provided cybersecurity services to organisations in sectors including financial services, healthcare, government, energy and other critical infrastructure.

=== Leadership ===
Ian Brown is executive chairman of Integrity360. Brown joined the company following the investment by August Equity in 2021, initially serving as executive chairman and chief executive. He had previously led cybersecurity company SecureData Europe before its acquisition by Orange in 2019.

Additional current executive leadership:

- Chief Executive Officer: Ian Brown
- Chief Financial Officer: Patrick McHale
- Chief Operating Officer: Thomas Schoendorff
- Group Sales Director: Matt Tomlinson

== Industry recognition ==
Integrity360 has stated that it has been recognised as a Gartner Representative Vendor in six Gartner Market Guides, covering Managed Security Services, Outsourced Managed Security Services, Managed Detection and Response, Co-Managed Security Monitoring Services, Managed SIEM Services and Cybersecurity Incident Response Retainer Services.

In 2026, Integrity360 was recognised as a Representative Vendor in Gartner's Market Guide for Outsourced Managed Security Services, published on 5 January 2026.

Integrity360 also stated that it was included as a Representative Vendor in Gartner's 2026 Market Guide for Cybersecurity Incident Response Retainer Services, published on 15 April 2026.

Earlier Gartner Market Guide inclusions reported by Integrity360 include the Market Guide for Managed Detection and Response Services in 2023 and 2024, including recognition as a Representative Vendor in the June 2024 Market Guide for Managed Detection and Response Services.

Gartner Peer Insights also lists Integrity360 Managed Detection and Response Services in the Managed Detection and Response market.

=== Accreditations and assurance schemes ===
The United Kingdom's National Cyber Security Centre (NCSC) lists Integrity360 as an assured Cyber Incident Response provider. Integrity360 is certified at the Standard Level under the NCSC Cyber Incident Response scheme.

Integrity360 is also listed by CREST as an accredited member company providing cybersecurity services.

The company operates payment security assessment services under programmes administered by the PCI Security Standards Council.

In August 2026, Integrity360 was selected as one of 33 organisations on the PCI Security Standards Council's 2026–2028 Global Executive Assessor Roundtable (GEAR).

=== Partner designations ===
Integrity360 works with cybersecurity technology companies including Microsoft and other security vendors.
