= Revenue assurance =

Revenue assurance (RA) telecommunication services, is the use of data quality and process improvement methods that improve profits, revenues and cash flows without influencing demand. This was defined by a TM Forum working group based on research documented in its Revenue Assurance Technical Overview.
