= Hyderabad Tehsil =

Coordinates: 25.4667°N 68.4000°E

Hyderabad Tehsil (rural)
- Tehsil
- حيدرآباد ٻهراڙي
- Country: Pakistan
- Province: Sindh
- District: Hyderabad District

Government
  - Nazim: Khawan Bux G.Muhammad
  - Naib Nazim: Mir Ghulam Hussain (Muhammad Ashraf)

Population (2017)
  - Total: 466,770
- Time zone: UTC+5 (PST)
- Number of Union Councils: 11

Hyderabad Tehsil (rural) (Sindhi: حيدرآباد ٻهراڙي) is an administrative subdivision (tehsil) of Hyderabad District in the Sindh province of Pakistan. Hyderabad district is subdivided into 4 talukas, the urban area around the capital Hyderabad is part of Hyderabad City Taluka.

== Administration ==
The rural Taluka (a synonym for tehsil) of Hyderabad is administratively subdivided into 20 Union Councils. These are:

UC	Name
UC-1	Hatri
UC-2	Barechani
UC-3	Masu Bhurgri
UC-4	Moosa Khatiyan
UC-5	Haji Sawan Khan Gopang
UC-6	Tando Qaiser
UC-7	Chuki
UC-8	Moolan
UC-9	Almani
UC-10	Halepota
UC-11	Seri
UC-12	Tando Fazal
UC-13	Tando Alam Mari
UC-14	Sanhwar
UC-15	Mori
UC-16	Bohki
UC-17	Tando Hyder
UC-18	Dhamachani
UC-19	Narejani
UC-20	Behram
