= Hyderabad District, Pakistan =

Hyderabad district: ضلعو حيدرآباد; ضلع حیدرآباد
- District
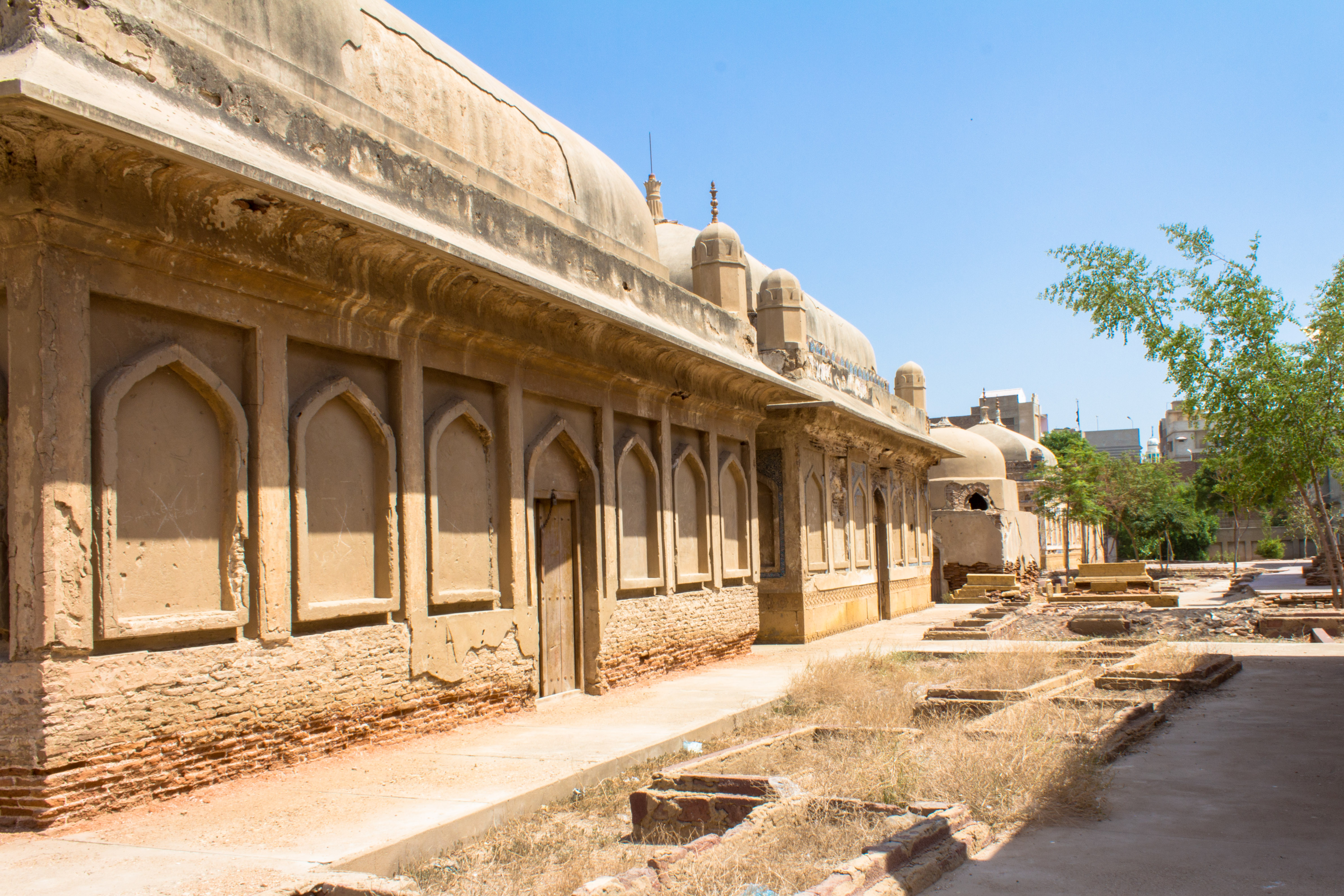
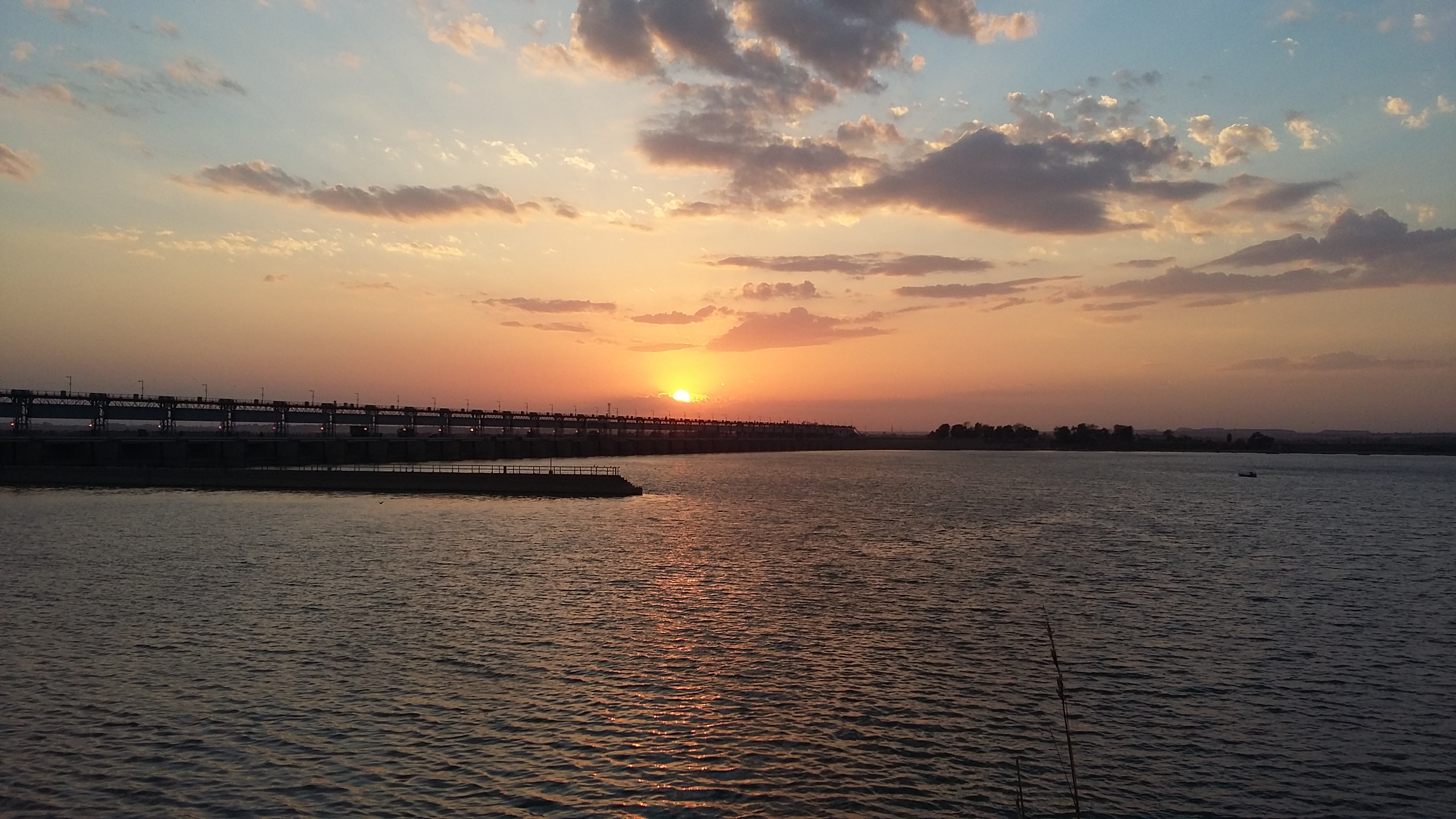
- Top: Tombs of Talpur Mirs; Bottom: Kotri Barrage

- Map of Sindh with Hyderabad District highlighted
- Coordinates: 25°15′N 68°45′E
- Country: Pakistan
- Province: Sindh
- Division: Hyderabad
- Established: 1843
- Founder: Government of India
- Headquarters: Hyderabad

Government
  - Type: District Administration
  - Deputy Commissioner: N/A
  - District Police Officer: N/A
  - District Health Officer: N/A

Area
  - District: 1,740 km^{2} (670 sq mi)

Population (2023)
  - District: 2,432,540
  - Density: 1,400/km^{2} (3,620/sq mi)
  - Urban: 2,022,379 (83.14%)
  - Rural: 410,161 (16.86%)

Literacy
  - Literacy rate: Total: 67.21%; Male: 70.86%; Female: 63.08%
- Time zone: UTC+5 (PKT)
- Official Languages: Urdu; English
- Provincial Language: Sindhi , Urdu
- Native Language: Sindhi
- Number of Tehsils: 4
- Website: www.hyderabad.gov.pk

Hyderabad District (Sindhi: ضلعو حيدرآباد Urdu: ضلع حیدرآباد), is a district of central Sindh locally called the Vichol Region of Sindh province of Pakistan. Its capital is the city of Hyderabad. The district is the second most urbanized in Sindh, after Karachi, with 80% of its population residing in urban areas.

== History ==
The East India Company occupied Sindh in 1843. They formed three districts in Sindh administratively: Hyderabad, Karachi and Shikarpur.

In 1901, a new taluka named Nasrat was created from Sakrand and Shahdadpur talukas.

In 1912, the northern side of the district separated to form Nawabshah district.

In 1975, the southern side also separated to form Badin district.

After the 1998 census, two new talukas were created in the district named; Hyderabad City and Latifabad talukas.

After the 2002 elections, a new taluka was created in the district named Qasimabad from Hyderabad City taluka.

The city of Hyderabad is where the district headquarters were located and the district government used to be seated. The last Deputy Commissioner of the district was Rizwan Ahmed. Until the early 1970s the district included all the four districts mentioned above as well as the Badin district. This administrative setup was demolished by former President Pervez Musharraf in 2001 when he introduced the local body government.

In 2005, three new districts (Tando Muhammad Khan, Matiari and Tando Allahyar) formed as subdivisions of Hyderabad.

== Geography ==
Hyderabad District is 104,877 hectares in size. 14,250 hectares of the district are under wheat cultivation, with a total annual production of over 55,000 tonnes.

== Administration and government ==
The district Administration is given below:

1. Hyderabad Tehsil (Rural Areas)
2. Hyderabad City Tehsil
3. Latifabad Tehsil
4. Qasimabad Tehsil
5. Tando Jam

== Demographics ==
Historical population
Year	Pop.	±% p.a.
1951	319,232	—
1961	537,000	+5.34%
1972	814,060	+3.85%
1981	1,005,460	+2.37%
1998	1,494,866	+2.36%
2017	2,199,928	+2.05%
2023	2,432,540	+1.69%

As of the 2023 census, Hyderabad district has 448,191 households and a population of 2,432,540. The district has a sex ratio of 112.79 males to 100 females and a literacy rate of 67.21%: 70.86% for males and 63.08% for females. 658,813 (27.08% of the surveyed population) are under 10 years of age. 2,022,379 (83.14%) live in urban areas.

=== Religion ===
Religions in Hyderabad district (2023)
Religion	Percent
Islam	90.67%
Hinduism	8.32%
Christianity	0.95%
Other	0.06%

The majority religion is Islam, with 90.67% of the population. Hinduism (including those from Scheduled Castes) is practiced by 8.32%, while Christianity is practiced by 0.95% of the population.

Religion in contemporary Hyderabad District
Religious group	1941		2017		2023	
Religious group	Pop.	%	Pop.	%	Pop.	%
Hinduism	115,015	53.51%	180,926	8.22%	202,368	8.32%
Islam	97,762	45.48%	1,998,896	90.86%	2,205,523	90.67%
Sikhism	1,587	0.74%	—N/a	—N/a	75	0%
Christianity	355	0.17%	18,975	0.86%	23,019	0.95%
Others (Note: Including Jainism, Christianity, Buddhism, Zoroastrianism, Judaism, Ad-Dharmis, or not stated)	214	0.10%	1,131	0.06%	1,555	0.06%
Total Population	214,933	100%	2,199,928	100%	2,432,540	100%
Note: 1941 census data is for Hyderabad taluk of Hyderabad District, which roughly corresponds to contemporary Hyderabad District. District and taluk borders have changed since 1961.

Religious groups in Hyderabad District (British Sindh era)
Religious group	1872		1881		1891		1901		1911		1921		1931		1941	
Religious group	Pop.	%	Pop.	%	Pop.	%	Pop.	%	Pop.	%	Pop.	%	Pop.	%	Pop.	%
Islam	558,272	77.33%	594,485	78.78%	713,000	77.61%	744,632	75.29%	781,219	75.32%	411,776	71.81%	460,920	69.53%	507,620	66.9%
Hinduism (Note: 1872 census: Also includes Tribals, Jains, Buddhists, and Nanakpanthis (Sikhs). 1881 census: Also includes Tribals and Nanakpanthis (Sikhs). 1891 census: Also includes Tribals. 1901 census: Also includes Tribals and Nanakpanthis (Sikhs).)	163,222	22.61%	159,515	21.14%	204,785	22.29%	242,692	24.54%	246,008	23.72%	160,211	27.94%	198,684	29.97%	245,849	32.4%
Christianity	391	0.05%	428	0.06%	778	0.08%	747	0.08%	1,130	0.11%	1,054	0.18%	771	0.12%	580	0.08%
Zoroastrianism	45	0.01%	21	0%	46	0.01%	89	0.01%	96	0.01%	57	0.01%	31	0%	30	0%
Judaism	17	0%	31	0%	32	0%	10	0%	15	0%	0	0%	10	0%	14	0%
Jainism	—N/a	—N/a	144	0.02%	0	0%	119	0.01%	171	0.02%	82	0.01%	187	0.03%	217	0.03%
Buddhism	—N/a	—N/a	0	0%	0	0%	0	0%	0	0%	0	0%	0	0%	0	0%
Sikhism	—N/a	—N/a	—N/a	—N/a	3	0%	—N/a	—N/a	3,073	0.3%	270	0.05%	2,205	0.33%	3,669	0.48%
Tribal	—N/a	—N/a	—N/a	—N/a	—N/a	—N/a	—N/a	—N/a	5,432	0.52%	0	0%	0	0%	769	0.1%
Others	0	0%	0	0%	2	0%	741	0.07%	0	0%	0	0%	116	0.02%	0	0%
Total population	721,947	100%	754,624	100%	918,646	100%	989,030	100%	1,037,144	100%	573,450	100%	662,924	100%	758,748	100%
Note1: British Sindh era district borders are not an exact match in the present-day due to various bifurcations to district borders — which since created new districts — throughout the region during the post-independence era that have taken into account population increases. Note2: Population decrease between 1911 and 1921 censuses due to bifurcation of district, and creation of Nawabshah District.

=== Language ===
Languages of Hyderabad district (2023)
1. Urdu (45.9%)
2. Sindhi (43.1%)
3. Punjabi (3.12%)
4. Pashto (2.83%)
5. Others (5.01%)

At the time of the 2023 census, 45.92% of the population spoke Urdu, 43.12% Sindhi, 3.12% Punjabi and 2.83% Pashto as their first language. The majority of Urdu speakers live in urban centers of Hyderabad such as latifabad where they live along with overwhelming population of Sindhis and small communities of Punjabis, and Pashtuns, while Sindhis also dominate urban centers like Qasimabad as well as rural parts of Hyderabad where they form majority.

== List of Dehs ==
The following is a list of Hyderabad District's Dehs, organised by taluka:

- Hyderabad Taluka (70 Dehs)
  - Abri
  - Agheemani
  - Almani
  - Alni
  - Amilpur
  - Barechani
  - Barham
  - Bhido Jagar
  - Bhido Rayati
  - Bhinpur
  - Bilori
  - Bohiki
  - Boochki Jagir
  - Boochki Rayati
  - Buxo laghari
  - Chacha Detha
  - Chukhi
  - Dachrapur
  - Dali Nandi
  - Dali Wadi
  - Damanchani Rayati
  - Dhamanchani Jagir
  - Ghaliyoon
  - Ghotana
  - Gujjan
  - Gul Mohd Thoro
  - Halepota
  - Hatri
  - Hotki
  - Hussain Khan Thoro
  - Kajhur
  - Kathri
  - Kathro
  - Khanpota
  - Khunjejani
  - Kunner
  - Lashari
  - Liyar Jagir
  - Mati
  - Miyano
  - Moharo
  - Moolan
  - Mori Jagir
  - Mori Rayati
  - Mulki
  - Narejani
  - Noorai Jagir
  - Noorai Rayati
  - Panhwari
  - Pasaikhi
  - Patbhari
  - Patoro
  - Raees
  - Rahooki
  - Rajpari
  - Rukanpur
  - Sahita
  - Sanhwar
  - Seri Jagir
  - Seri Rayati
  - Sipki Jagir
  - Sipki Rayati
  - Sukhpur
  - Takio Jeewan Shah Jagir
  - Takio Jeewan Shah Rayati
  - Tando Fazal
  - Tando Qaiser
  - Thaheem
  - Theba
  - Widh
- Qasimabad Taluka (4 Dehs)
  - Jamshoro
  - Mirzapur
  - Sari
  - Shah Bukhari
- Latifabad Taluka (10 Dehs)
  - Bora Reyati
  - Ganjo Takar
  - Giddu Bandar
  - Goondar
  - Khater
  - Lakhi Keti
  - Malh
  - Mehrani
  - Met Khan
  - Nareja
- Hyderabad City Taluka (4 Dehs)
  - Foujgah
  - Ghanghra
  - Gujjo
  - Hyderabad

== See also ==
- Divisions of Pakistan
  - Divisions of Balochistan
  - Divisions of Khyber Pakhtunkhwa
  - Divisions of Punjab
  - Divisions of Sindh
  - Divisions of Azad Kashmir
  - Divisions of Gilgit-Baltistan
- Tehsils of Pakistan
  - Tehsils of Punjab, Pakistan
  - Tehsils of Khyber Pakhtunkhwa, Pakistan
  - Tehsils of Balochistan, Pakistan
  - Tehsils of Sindh, Pakistan
  - Tehsils of Azad Kashmir
  - Tehsils of Gilgit-Baltistan
- Districts of Pakistan
  - Districts of Khyber Pakhtunkhwa, Pakistan
  - Districts of Punjab, Pakistan
  - Districts of Balochistan, Pakistan
  - Districts of Sindh, Pakistan
  - Districts of Azad Kashmir
  - Districts of Gilgit-Baltistan
- Hyderabad, Sindh
- List of educational institutions in Hyderabad, Sindh
- Shiv temple, Hyderabad

== Bibliography ==
- 1998 District census report of Hyderabad. Census publication. Vol. 59. Islamabad: Population Census Organization, Statistics Division, Government of Pakistan. 1999.
