= Ayub Khan =

President of Pakistan from 1958 to 1969

Ayub Khan NPk HJ HPk MBE Grand Cordon LOM GCR
- ایوب خان
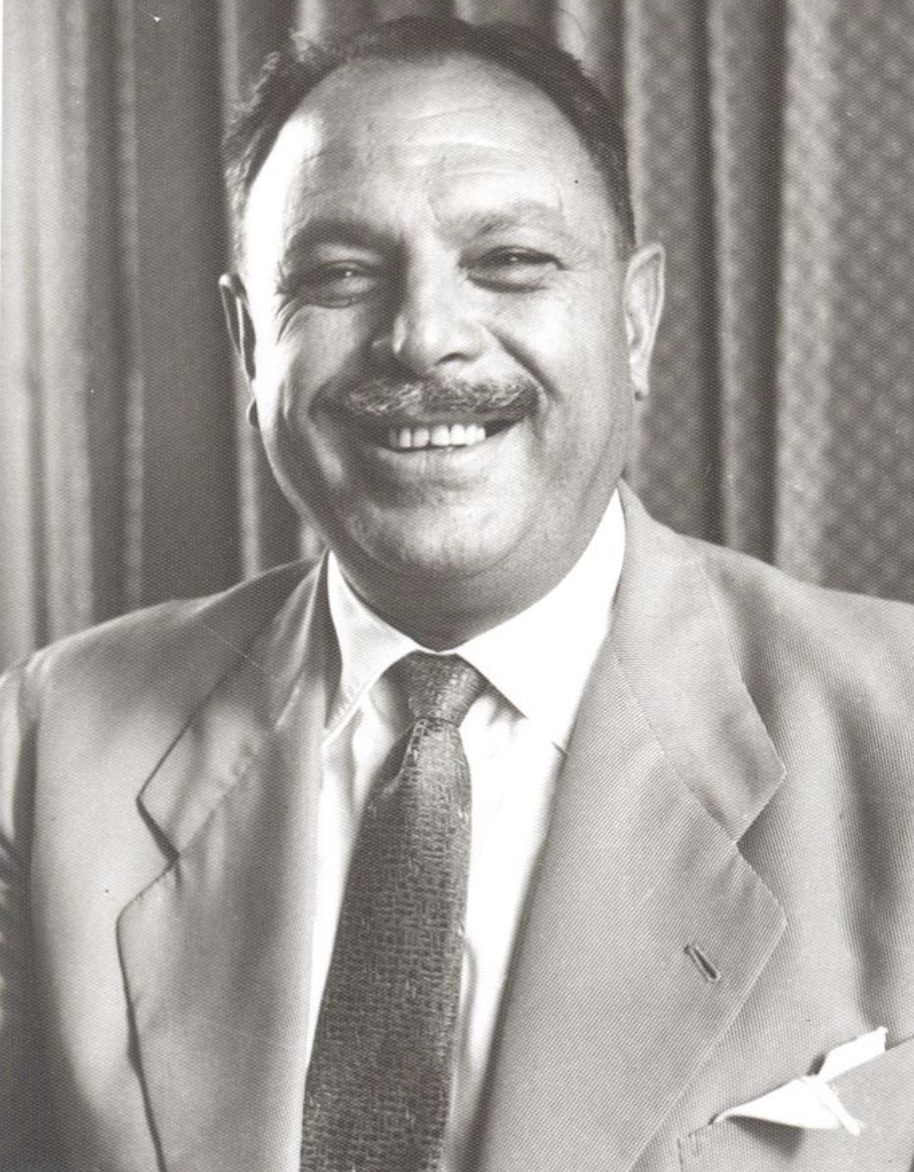
- Official Portrait ,1960

2nd President of Pakistan
- In office 27 October 1958 – 25 March 1969
- Prime Minister: Himself (as Acting)
- Preceded by: Iskander Ali Mirza
- Succeeded by: Yahya Khan

1st Chief Martial Law Administrator
- In office 7 October 1958 – 8 June 1962
- President: Iskander Ali Mirza; Himself
- Preceded by: Feroz Khan Noon (as Prime Minister)
- Succeeded by: Yahya Khan (1969)

4th & 10th Minister of Defence
- In office 28 October 1958 – 21 October 1966
- President: Himself
- Deputy: Muhammad Khurshid; S. Fida Hussain; Nazir Ahmed; S. I. Haque (Defence Secretary)
- Preceded by: Muhammad Ayub Khuhro
- Succeeded by: Afzal Rahman Khan
- In office 24 October 1954 – 11 August 1955
- Governors General: Malik Ghulam Muhammad; Iskander Ali Mirza
- Prime Minister: Mohammad Ali Bogra (1954–55)
- Deputy: Akhter Husain (Defence Secretary)
- Preceded by: Mohammad Ali Bogra
- Succeeded by: Chaudhry Muhammad Ali

12th Minister of Interior
- In office 23 March 1965 – 17 August 1965
- President: Himself
- Deputy: Interior Secretary
- Preceded by: Khan Habibullah Khan
- Succeeded by: Chaudhry Ali Akbar Khan

3rd Commander-in-Chief of the Pakistan Army
- In office 23 January 1951 – 27 October 1958
- President: Iskander Ali Mirza
- Governors General: Khwaja Nazimuddin (1951); Malik Ghulam Muhammad (1951–55); Iskander Ali Mirza; (1955–56)
- Prime Minister: Liaquat Ali Khan (1951); Nazimuddin (1951–53); Mohammad Ali Bogra (1953–55); Chaudhry Muhammad Ali (1955–56); Huseyn Shaheed Suhrawardy (1956–57); I. I. Chundrigar (1957); Feroz Khan Noon; (1957–58)
- Chief of General Staff: Maj. Gen. Yusuf Khan; (1951–1953); Maj. Gen. Mian Hayaud Din; (1953–1955); Maj. Gen. Sher Ali Khan Pataudi; (1955–1957); Maj. Gen. Yahya Khan; (1957–1958)
- Preceded by: General Gracey
- Succeeded by: General Musa Khan

Personal details
- Born: 14 May 1907 Haripur, North-West Frontier Province, British India
- Died: 19 April 1974 (aged 66) Islamabad, Pakistan
- Resting place: Haripur, Khyber Pakhtunkhwa, Pakistan
- Citizenship: British India (1907–1947); Pakistan (1947–1974)
- Party: Convention Muslim League (before 1974)
- Other political affiliations: Pakistan Muslim League (1962)
- Spouse: Zubaida Khatoon
- Children: 6, including Gohar Ayub Khan
- Relatives: Sardar Bahadur Khan (brother); Omar Ayub Khan (grandson); Akbar Ayub Khan (grandson); Arshad Ayub Khan (grandson); Yousuf Ayub Khan (grandson)
- Education: Royal Military College, Sandhurst

Military service
- Branch/service: British Indian Army (1928–1947); Pakistan Army (1947–1958)
- Years of service: 1928–1958 (Note: Ayub retired from active service in 1958; however, he made himself field marshal in 1959. See "Military Ruler Gets Himself Elevated", {{blockquote President Ayub made Field Marshal General Mohammad Ayub Khan was conferred the rank of Field Marshal by the presidential cabinet. The communique said that the conferment of this rank will serve to demonstrate to the world in a humble way the high esteem in which he is held by his people and how grateful the nation is to its saviour. The rank of Field Marshal is the highest rank of armies built on the patron of the British Army. The press communique added that by a peaceful revolution last year, the President had not only defended the territorial integrity of Pakistan but had also saved the very existence of the nation. }})
- Rank: Field Marshal (Note: Ayub never had an active regular military appointment of the rank of field marshal, his last military appointment was the commander-in-chief of the Pakistan Army in the rank of full general.); Service number: PA-10
- Unit: 14th Punjab Regiment
- Commands: Adjutant General; GOC, 14th Infantry Division; 10th Infantry Brigade
- Battles/wars: Waziristan campaign (1936–1939); World War II; Pacific War; Burma campaign; Indo-Pakistani War of 1947; Afghanistan–Pakistan border skirmishes; Bajaur Campaign; Operation Desert Hawk; Indo-Pakistani War of 1965

Field Marshal Mohammad Ayub Khan NPk HJ HPk MBE (14 May 1907 – 19 April 1974) was a Pakistani politician and military officer who served as the 2nd president of Pakistan from 1958 until his resignation in 1969. He was the first native commander-in-chief of the Pakistan Army, serving from 1951 to 1958. Khan's presidency started in 1958 when he overthrew President Iskander Mirza in a coup d'état, and ended in 1969 when he resigned amid mass protests and strikes across the country.

Born in the North-West Frontier Province, Khan was educated at the Aligarh Muslim University and trained at the Royal Military College, Sandhurst. He fought in the Second World War on the British side against the Imperial Japanese Army. After the Partition of British India in August 1947, he joined the Pakistan Army and was posted in East Bengal. In 1951, he became the first native commander-in-chief, succeeding General Gracey. From 1953 to 1958, he served in the civilian government as Defence and Home Minister and supported President Iskandar Ali Mirza's decision to impose martial law against prime minister Feroz Khan Noon's administration on 7 October 1958. Three weeks later, Ayub Khan seized the presidency in a military coup, the first in the country's history.

As president, Khan appointed General Musa Khan to replace him as Commander-in-Chief of the Pakistan Army, who served as Army Chief for 8 years under President Khan. He aligned Pakistan with the United States, and allowed American access to air bases inside Pakistan, most notably the airbase outside of Peshawar, from which spy missions over the Soviet Union were launched. Relations with neighboring China were strengthened, but his alignment with the US worsened relations with the Soviet Union in 1962. He launched Operation Gibraltar against India in 1965, leading to an all-out war. It resulted in a stalemate, and peace was restored via the Tashkent Declaration. Domestically, Ayub subscribed to the laissez-faire policy of Western-aligned nations at the time. Ayub Khan privatised state-owned industries and liberalised the economy generally. Large inflows of foreign aid and investment led to the fastest-growing economy in South Asia. His tenure was also distinguished by the completion of hydroelectric stations, dams, and reservoirs. Under Khan, Pakistan's space program was established, and the country launched its first uncrewed space mission by 1962. However, the failure of land reforms and a weak taxation system meant that most of this growth landed in the hands of the elite. In 1965, Khan entered the presidential race as the Convention Muslim League's candidate to counter the opposition candidate Fatima Jinnah. Khan won the elections and was re-elected for a second term. In 1967, disapproval of price hikes of food prompted demonstrations across the country led by Zulfikar Ali Bhutto. Following the protests in East Pakistan, Khan resigned on 25 March 1969 and appointed General Yahya Khan as his successor. Later, fighting a brief illness, he died in 1974.

Ayub Khan remains the country's longest-serving president and second-longest serving head of state. His legacy remains mixed; his era is often referred to as the "Decade of Development." Khan is credited with economic prosperity and industrialisation. He is denounced by critics for beginning the first of the intelligence agencies' incursions into national politics, for concentrating wealth in a corrupt few hands, and for geographically discriminatory policies that later led to the Bangladesh Liberation War.

== Early life and education ==
Ayub Khan was born on 14 May 1907 in Rehana, a village in the Haripur district of the North-West Frontier Province of British India into a Hindko-speaking family of Pashtun descent, belonging to the Tareen tribe.

He was the first child of the second wife of Mir Dad Khan, a Risaldar-Major (an armoured corps JCO which was then known as VCO) in the 9th Hodson's Horse which was a cavalry regiment of the British Indian Army. For his basic education, he was enrolled in a school in Sarai Saleh, which was about 4 miles from his village. He used to go to school on a mule's back and was shifted to a school in Haripur, where he started living with his grandmother.

He went on to study at Aligarh Muslim University (AMU) and while pursuing his college education, he was accepted into the Royal Military College, Sandhurst on the recommendation of General Andrew Skeen; he trained first in India and then departed for Great Britain. Ayub Khan was fluent in Urdu, Pashto, English, and his native Hindko language.

== Military service ==
=== British India ===
Ayub Khan was admitted to the Royal Military College, Sandhurst, in 1926. He was commissioned as a second lieutenant on 2 February 1928 in the 1st Battalion of the 14th Punjab Regiment (better known as 1/14th Punjab Regiment) of the British Indian Army – before this he was attached to the Royal Fusiliers. Amongst those who passed out with him was Joyanto Nath Chaudhuri, who served as Chief of the Army Staff of India from 1962 to 1966 while Ayub was the president of Pakistan. After the standard probationary period of service in the British Army, he was appointed to the British Indian Army on 10 April 1929, joining the 1/14th Punjab Regiment Sherdils, now known as the 5th Punjab Regiment.

He was promoted to lieutenant on 2 May 1930 and to captain on 2 February 1937. During World War II, he was promoted to the temporary rank of lieutenant-colonel in 1942 and was posted in Burma to participate in the first phase of the Burma Campaign in 1942–43. He was promoted to the permanent rank of major on 2 February 1945. Later that year, he was promoted to temporary colonel and assumed the command of his own regiment in which he was commissioned to direct operations in the second phase of the Burma Campaign.

In 1946, he was posted back to British India and was stationed in the North-West Frontier Province. In 1947, he was promoted to brigadier and commanded a brigade in South Waziristan.

=== Early career in Pakistan ===
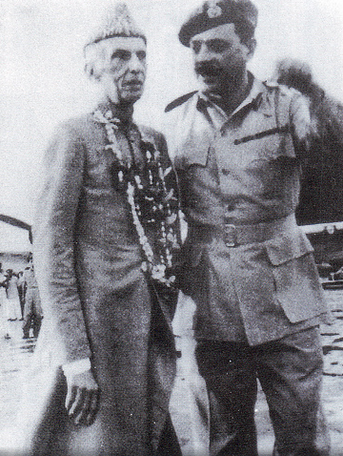
Brigadier Ayub with Muhammad Ali Jinnah in Dacca Cantonment, c. 1948

When the United Kingdom announced the Partition of British India into India and Pakistan, he was one of the most senior serving officers in the British Indian Army who opted for Pakistan in 1947. At the time of his joining, he was the tenth ranking officer in terms of seniority with service number PA-010.

In the early part of 1948, he was given the command of the 14th Infantry Division in the rank of acting major-general stationed in Dacca, East Pakistan. In 1949, he was decorated with the Hilal-i-Jurat (HJ) by Prime Minister Liaquat Ali Khan for non-combatant service and called back to General Headquarters as the Adjutant General of the army on November of the same year.

=== Commander-in-chief of the Pakistan Army ===
King Zahir Shah arrives at PAF Station Mauripur with President Iskandar Mirza and Nahid Mirza, greeted by C-in-C of the PAF Asghar Khan and Nur Khan. In attendance were chiefs from the Iraqi, Turkish, and Iranian Air Forces. General Ayub Khan is seen in the footage from 0:37–0:39. The World record loop is showcased towards the end of the video. (2 February 1958)

As the tenure of General Gracey was nearing its end at the close of 1949, the Pakistan government had called for appointing native commanders-in-chief of the army, air force, and navy and dismissed deputation appointments from the British military. General Headquarters sent the nomination papers to the Prime Minister's Secretariat for the appointment of commander-in-chief. There were four major generals in the race: Muhammed Akbar Khan, Iftikhar Khan, Ishfakul Majid, and Nawabzada Agha Mohammad Raza. Among these officers, Akbar was the senior, having been commissioned in 1920.

That year, Gracey approached Akbar Khan to succeed him. However, Akbar declined, citing that the position was beyond his competence. The next candidate in line was Akbar's younger brother, Iftikhar Khan. However, Iftikhar died in an air crash in December 1949 before he could take office, resulting in Gracey's extension. On 23 January 1951, General Ayub Khan succeeded him.

Defence Secretary Iskandar Mirza at that time played a crucial role in lobbying for the army post selection, by presenting convincing arguments to Prime Minister Liaquat Ali Khan to promote the most junior major-general, Ayub Khan (commissioned in 1928), to the post despite the fact that his name was not included in the nomination list. Ayub's papers of promotion were approved, and he was appointed the first native commander-in-chief of the Pakistan Army on 17 January 1951 by Prime Minister Ali Khan. This ended the transitional role of British military officers in the army. The events surrounding Ayub's appointment set the precedent for a native general being promoted out of turn, ostensibly because he was the least ambitious of the generals in the line of promotion and the most loyal to civil government at that time.

In September 1953, Ayub visited Turkey in his capacity as army chief. The Turkish defence minister was the only civilian leader with whom he met. Ayub wanted a military pact with Turkey, but found their government reluctant to talk in detail about regional defence. Thereafter, he went to the United States. Although nominally a "medical visit", while there he made a strong plea for military aid. The US State Department and The Pentagon considered the idea, but nothing came of it due to India's opposition.

=== Cabinet and defence minister ===
In 1954, Prime Minister Muhammad Ali Bogra's relations with the military and Governor-General Ghulam Muhammad deteriorated on issues of the economy. Pressure built up to reconstruct the cabinet which eventually witnessed General Ayub Khan becoming the defence minister and Iskander Mirza as home minister in October 1954.

On 24 February 1955, Ayub signed the Central Treaty Organization (CENTO) pact for Pakistan and his role in national politics, along with that of Mirza, began to grow. Ayub Khan disdained civilian politicians, whose factional infighting had for years prevented the adoption of a constitution. He wrote that he reluctantly joined the cabinet as defence minister with "two clear objectives: to save the armed forces from the interference of the politicians, and to unify the provinces of West Pakistan into one unit."

The controversial One Unit Scheme integrated the four western provinces into one political entity, West Pakistan, as a counterbalance against the numerically superior population of East Bengal, which was renamed East Pakistan. The province of Punjab supported the project, but all the other provinces protested against it and its centralisation of power. Opposition was particularly strong in East Bengal, where it was seen as an attack on the democratic principle of political egalitarianism.

In 1955, Prime Minister Bogra was dismissed by Governor-General Malik Ghulam Muhammad, and he was succeeded by the new Prime Minister Chaudhry Muhammad Ali as the Defence Minister.

After the 1954 provincial elections in East Pakistan, the Awami League formed the government there while West Pakistan was governed by the PML, but the PML government collapsed in 1956. He was called on to join the Cabinet as Defence Minister by Prime Minister H.S. Suhrawardy and maintained closer relations with Iskander Mirza, who had now become the first President of the country after the successful promulgation of the Constitution in 1956. In 1957, President Mirza promoted him from acting full general to the substantive rank of full general.

Around this time, the MoD, led by General Ayub Khan, began to see the serious interservice rivalry between the General Headquarters staff and the Naval Headquarters staff. Commander in Chief of Navy Vice-Admiral HMS Choudri and his NHQ staff had been fighting with the Finance ministry and the MoD over the issues of rearmament and contingency plans.

He reportedly complained about Admiral HMS Choudri to President Mirza and criticized Admiral Choudri for "neither having the brain, imagination, or depth of thought to understand such (defence) problems nor the vision or the ability to make any contribution." The impasse was broken with Admiral Choudri resigning from the navy in protest as a result of having differences with the navy's plans of expansion and modernization.

== Presidency (1958–1969) ==
=== 1958 military coup ===
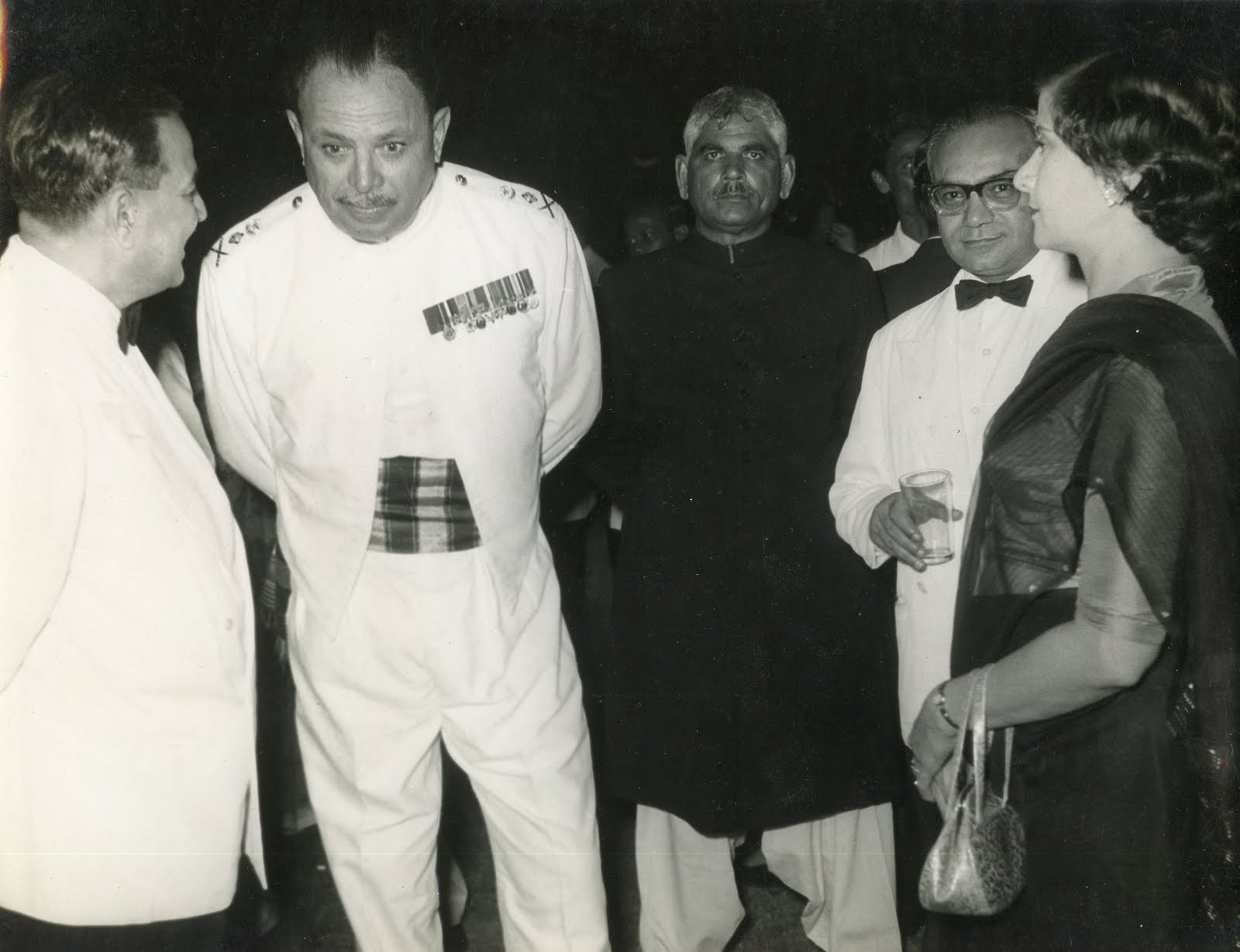
Ayub Khan in 1958 with H. S. Suhrawardy and Mr. and Mrs. Shaikh Nazrul Bakar

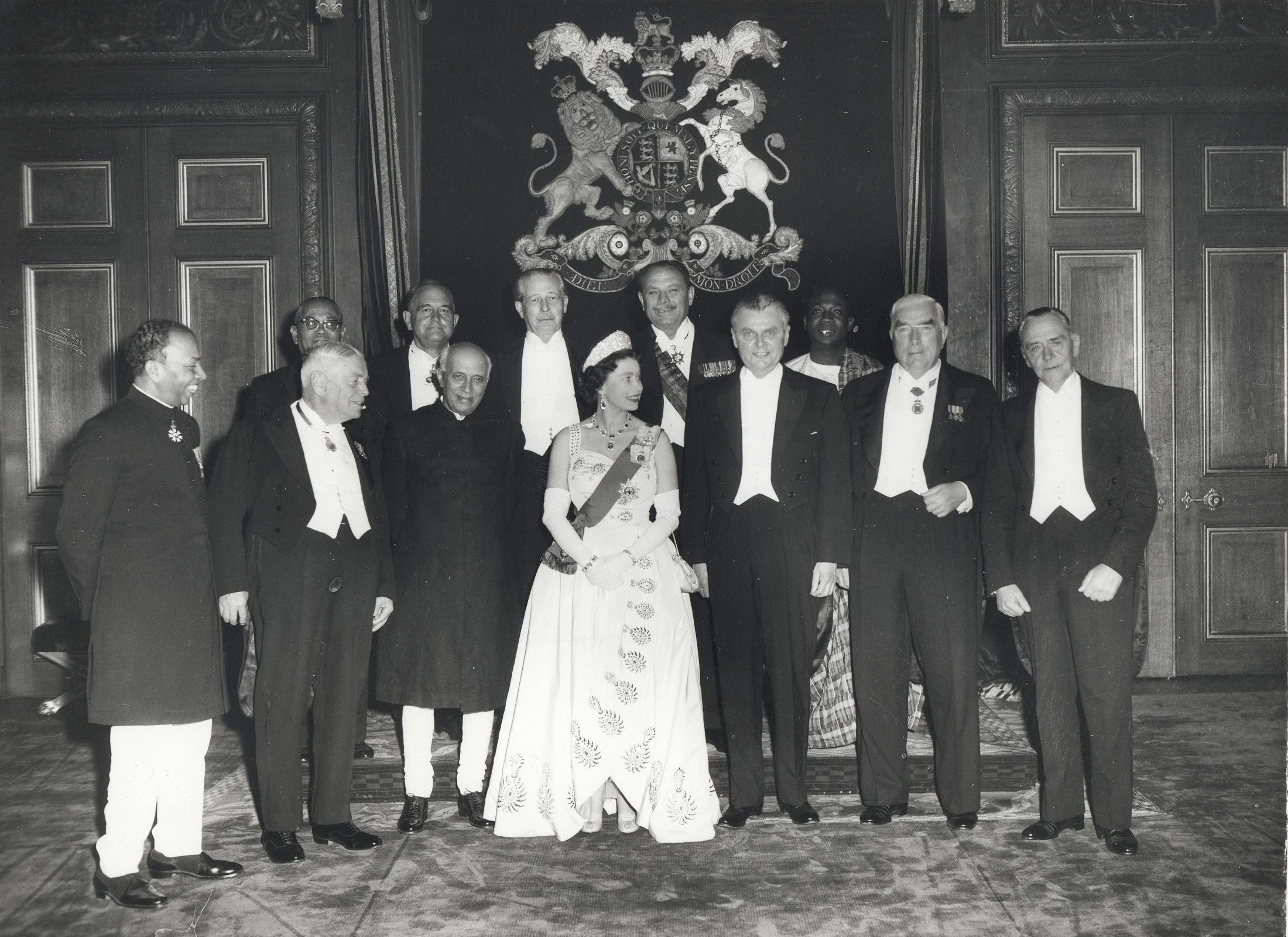
Ayub Khan (back row, second from the right) with Elizabeth II, former Queen of Pakistan at the 1960 Commonwealth Prime Minister's Conference, Windsor Castle

Suhrawardy and Feroz began campaigning to become prime minister and president in the upcoming general elections. Meanwhile, the conservative Pakistan Muslim League, led by its President Abdul Qayyum Khan, was threatening to engage in civil disobedience. These events were against President Mirza hence he was willing to dissolve even Pakistan's One Unit for his advantage.

On 7 October 1958, President Iskandar Ali Mirza abrogated the Constitution of Pakistan of 1956 after sending a letter to Prime Minister Feroz announcing a coup d'état and appointed General Ayub Khan as Chief Martial Law Administrator.

On 13 October, General Ayub Khan assigned Lt. General Wajid Ali Khan Burki the task of improving the efficiency of hospitals and health agencies. Within days, Karachi hospitals showed significant improvement, and the medical services took on a new outlook.

Two weeks later, on 27 October 1958, Ayub Khan carried out his own coup d'état against Mirza. Most of the country's politicians only became aware of the coup the next morning; only U.S. Ambassador to Pakistan James M. Langley was kept fully informed of political developments in the country.

Ayub justified his part by declaring that: "History would never have forgiven us if the present chaotic conditions were allowed to go on any further," and that his goal was to restore a democracy that the "people can understand and work", not to rule indefinitely. When the public was informed, public reactions were mixed. The immediate crackdown on smuggling, corruption, and trafficking won Ayub plenty of support from the commoners. The middle-class and the upper-middle class were more apprehensive.

President Mirza himself was apprehensive, though for a different reason. He had been contemplating replacing Ayub Khan, and it seems that Ayub knew. Immediately after the Supreme Court's Chief Justice Munir justified the coup under the doctrine of necessity, Ayub sent the military into the presidential palace and exiled Mirza to England. This was largely done with the support of: Admiral A. R. Khan, General Azam Khan, Nawab of Kalabagh Amir Khan, General Wajid Khan, General K. M. Sheikh, and General Sher Bahadur. Air Vice Marshal Asghar Khan was asked by General Ayub Khan to join the Generals to demand Mirza's resignation, but Asghar Khan declined the request, stating that he "found the whole exercise distasteful."

The regime came to power with the intent of instituting widespread reform and 'to bring the country back to sanity'. Like Mirza, Ayub advocated for greater centralization of power, and his ruling style was more American than British. He "vowed to give people access to speedier justice, curb the crippling birth rate, and take appropriate steps, including land reforms and technological innovation, to develop agriculture so that the country could feed itself."

Ayub finally "restored civil administration", although he maintained the Presidency and relied on an intricate web of spy agencies to maintain supremacy over the bureaucracy, including calling upon civilian intelligence agencies.

In 1960, a referendum, that functioned as the Electoral College, was held that asked the general public: "Do you have confidence in Muhammad Ayub Khan?" The voter turnout was recorded at 95.6% and such confirmation was used as impetus to formalise the new system – a presidential system. Ayub Khan was elected president for the next five years and decided to pay his first state visit to the United States with his wife and also daughter Begum Naseem Aurangzeb in July 1961. Highlights of his visit included a state dinner at Mount Vernon, a visit to the Islamic Center of Washington, and a ticker tape parade in New York City.

=== Domestic policy ===
==== Constitutional and legal reforms ====
A constitutional commission was set up under the Supreme Court to implement the work on the constitution that was led by Chief Justice Muhammad Shahabuddin and Supreme Court justices. The commission reported in 1961 with its recommendations, but President Ayub remained unsatisfied; he eventually altered the constitution so that it was entirely different from the one recommended by the Shahabuddin Commission. The constitution reflected his personal views on politicians and the restriction on using religion in politics. His presidency restored the writ of government through the promulgated constitution and restored political freedom by lifting the martial law enforced since 1958.

The new constitution respected Islam, but did not declare Islam as the state religion and was viewed as a liberal constitution. It also provided for election of the president by 80,000 (later raised to 120,000) Basic Democrats who could theoretically make their own choice but who were essentially under his control. He justified this as analogous to the American Electoral College and cited Thomas Jefferson as his inspiration. The Ayub administration "guided" the print newspapers through his takeover of key opposition papers and, while Ayub Khan permitted a National Assembly, it had only limited powers.

In 1961, he promulgated the "Muslim Family Law Ordinance." Through this ordinance, unmitigated polygamy was abolished. Consent of the current wife was made mandatory for a second marriage, and brakes were placed on the practice of instant divorce under Islamic tradition, where men could divorce women by saying: "I divorce you" three times.

The Arbitration Councils were set up under the law in the urban and rural areas to deal with cases of: (a) grant of sanction to a person to contract a second marriage during the subsistence of a marriage; (b) reconciliation of a dispute between a husband and a wife; (c) grant of a maintenance allowance to the wife and children.

==== Economy ====
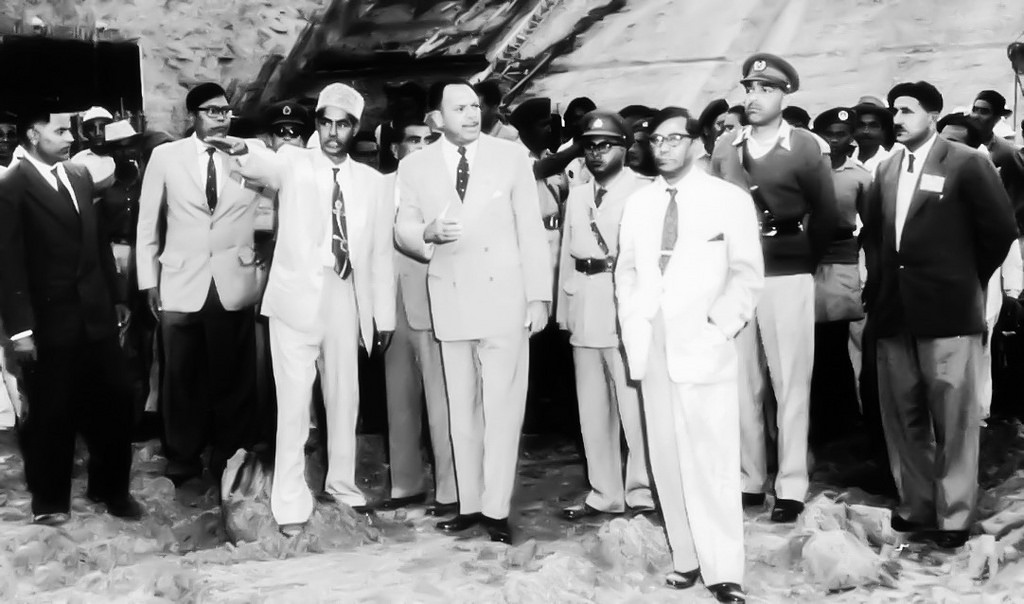
Ayub Khan visits the Kaptai Dam in East Pakistan, 1962

Industrialization and rural development through constructing modern national freeways are considered his greatest achievements, and his era is remembered for successful industrialization in the impoverished country. Strong emphasis on capitalism and foreign direct investment (FDI) in the industry is often regarded as the "Great Decade" in the history of the country (both economical and political history).

The "Decade of Development" was celebrated, which highlighted the development plans executed during the years of Ayub's rule, the private consortium companies and industries, and is credited with creating an environment where the private sector was encouraged to establish medium and small-scale industries in Pakistan. This opened up avenues for new job opportunities and thus the economic graph of the country started rising. He oversaw the development and completion of mega projects such as hydroelectric dams, power stations, and barrages all over the country. During 1960–66, the annual GDP growth was recorded at 6.8%.

Several hydroelectric projects were completed, including the Mangla Dam (one of the world's largest dams), several small dams and water reservoirs in West Pakistan, and one dam in East Pakistan, the Kaptai Dam. President Ayub authorized the planning of nuclear power plants. Abdus Salam, supported by the President, personally approved the project in Karachi while the project in East Pakistan never materialized.

Extensive education reforms were supposedly carried out, and 'scientific development efforts' were also supposedly made during his years. These policies could not be sustained after 1965, when the economy collapsed and leading to economic declines that he was unable to control.

Ayub introduced new curricula and textbooks for universities and schools. Many public-sector universities and schools were built during his era. He also introduced agricultural reforms preventing anyone from occupying more than 500 acres of irrigated and 1000 acres of unirrigated land. His administration redistributed approximately 23 percent of the country's farmland to onetime tenant farmers. In Karachi, around 100,000 refugees displaced by the partition of India were moved from slums to new housing colonies. His administration also eliminated the need for bribes, known as "tea money" in Pakistan, to access government officials, contributing to a reduction in corruption within Pakistan's government relative to other Asian nations during his tenure.

An oil refinery was established in Karachi. These reforms led to 15% GNP growth of the country, which was three times greater than that of India. Despite the increase in the GNP growth, the profit and revenue was gained by the famous 22 families of the time that controlled 66% of the industries and land of the country and 80% of the banking and insurance companies of Pakistan.

==== Defence spending ====
During the Ayub era, the navy was able to introduce submarines and slowly modified itself by acquiring warships. However, Ayub drastically reduced funding of the military in the 1950s and de-prioritized nuclear weapons in the 1960s. The military relied on donations from the United States for major weapons procurements. Major funding was made available for military acquisitions and procurement towards conventional weaponry for conventional defence. In the 1960s, the Pakistani military acquired American‑produced conventional weapons such as Jeep CJs, M48 Patton and M24 Chaffee tanks, M16 rifles, F-86 fighter airplanes, and the submarine PNS Ghazi; all through the US Foreign Military Sales program. In 1961, President Ayub started the nation's full‑fledged space program in cooperation with the air force, and created the Suparco civilian space agency that launched sounding rockets throughout the 1960s.

Ayub prioritized nuclear power generation over the use of nuclear technology for military purposes. He reportedly spent ₨. 724 million on the civilian Karachi Nuclear Power Plant and related education of engineers and scientists.

Ayub Khan filled more and more civil administrative positions with army officers, increasing the military's influence over the bureaucracy. He expanded the size of the army by more than half from the early 1960s to 1969, and maintained a high level of military spending as a percentage of GDP during that period, peaking in the immediate aftermath of the Indo-Pakistani War of 1965.

=== Foreign policy ===
==== U.S. alliance and 1960 U-2 incident ====
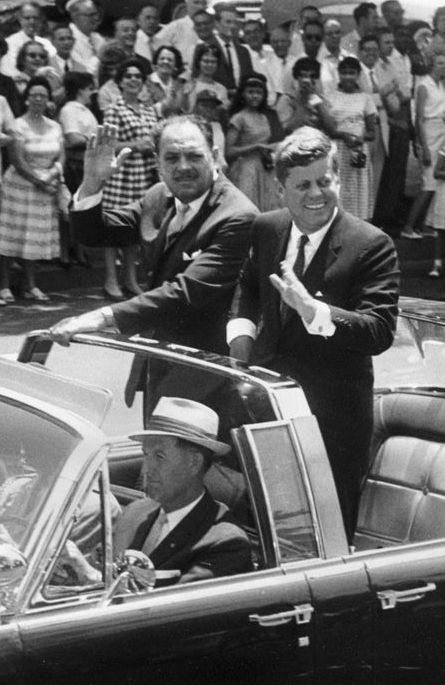
President Ayub with President Kennedy in Washington D.C., 1961

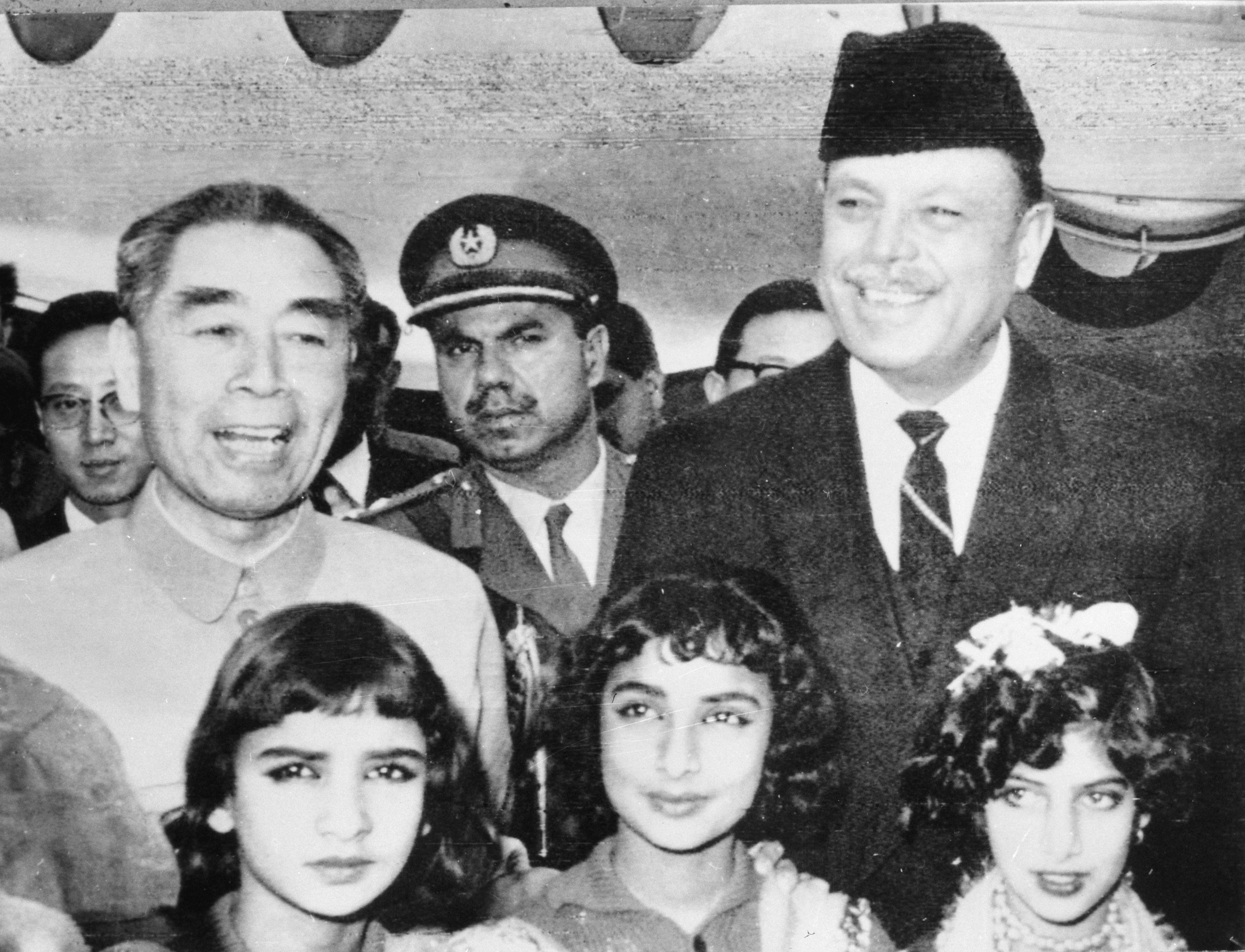
Khan with Chinese Premier Zhou Enlai in 1964

The main feature of Ayub Khan's foreign policy was prioritizing relations with the United States and Europe. Foreign relations with the Soviet Union were downplayed. He enjoyed support from President Dwight Eisenhower in the 1950s and, working with Prime Minister Ali Khan, forged a military alliance with the United States against regional communism. His obsession towards modernization of the armed forces in the shortest time possible saw relations with the United States as the only way to achieve his organizational and personal objectives, as he argued against civilian supremacy that would affect American interests in the region as a result of an election.

The Central Intelligence Agency leased Peshawar Air Station in the 1950s, and spying into the Soviet Union from the air station grew immensely, with Ayub's full knowledge, during his presidency. When these activities were exposed in 1960 after a U-2 flying out of the air station was shot down and its pilot captured by the USSR, President Ayub was in the United Kingdom on a state visit. When the local CIA station chief briefed President Ayub on the incident, Ayub shrugged his shoulders and said that he had expected this would happen at some point.

Soviet Secretary General Nikita Khrushchev threatened to bomb Peshawar if the United States continued to operate aircraft from there against the Soviet Union. Ayub Khan apologised for the incident when he visited the Soviet Union five years later.

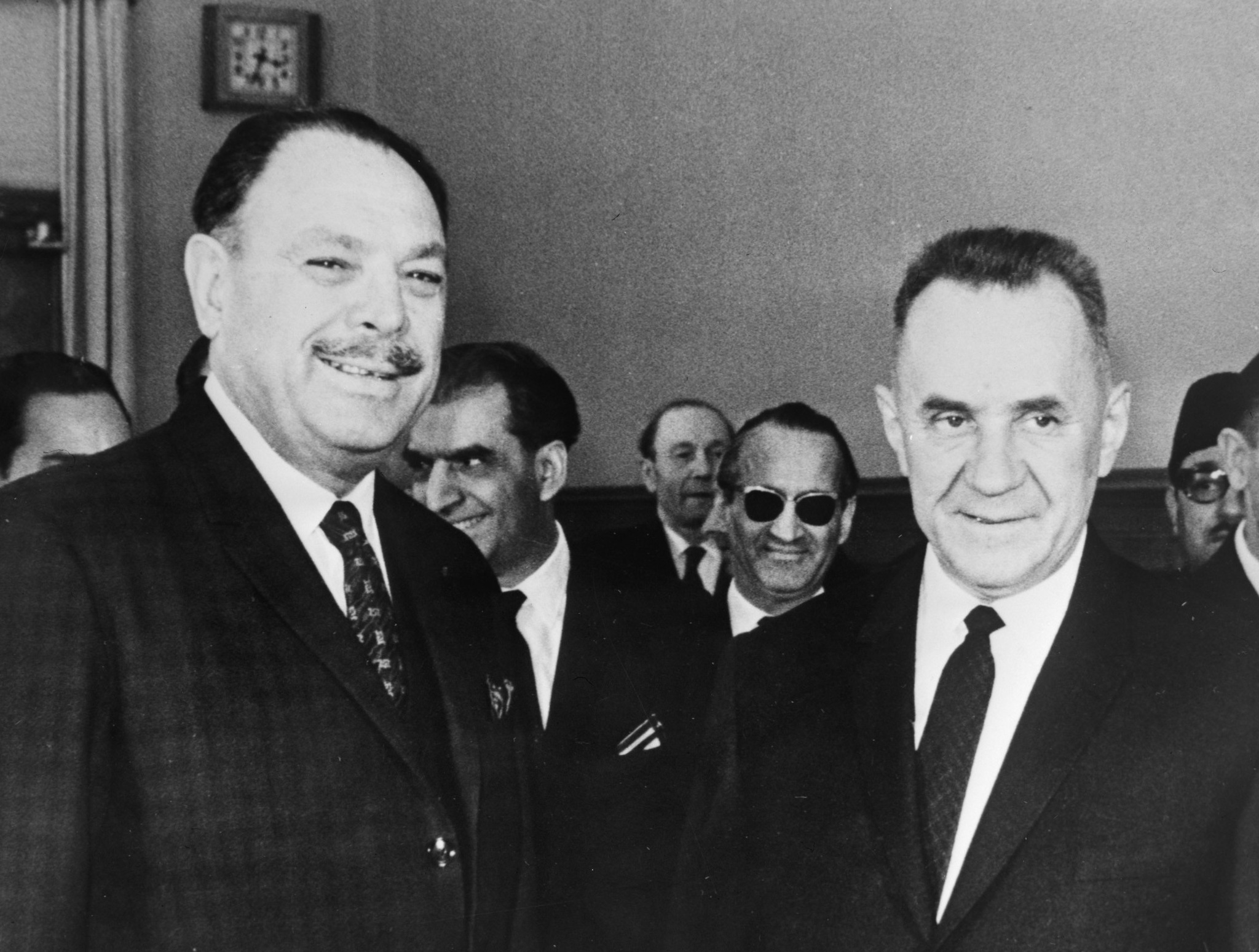
President Ayub Khan meeting Soviet Premier Alexei Kosygin in the 1960s

President Ayub directed his Foreign Office to reduce tensions with the Soviet Union by facilitating state visits by Soviet Premier Alexei Kosygin and Soviet Foreign Minister Andrei Gromyko and agreeing to downplay relations with the United States.

In 1963, Ayub signed the historic Sino-Pakistan Frontier Agreement with China despite US opposition.

During 1961–65, Ayub lost much of his support from President John F. Kennedy and President Lyndon Johnson as they sought closer relations with India. President Johnson placed an embargo on both nations during the war in 1965. Relations with the Soviet Union were eventually normalized when the Soviets facilitated a peace treaty between Pakistan and India in 1965, and reached a trade treaty with Pakistan the following year. In 1966–67, Ayub wrestled with the United States' attempt to dictate Pakistan's foreign policy, while he strengthened relations with the Soviet Union and China. Despite initiatives to normalize relations with the Soviet Union, Ayub Khan remained inclined towards the United States and the western world, receiving President Johnson in Karachi in 1967.

In 1961–62, Ayub paid a state visit to the United Kingdom. He attracted much attention from the British public when his involvement in the Christine Keeler affair was revealed.

==== Relations with India and 1965 war ====
In 1959, Ayub Khan's interest in building defence forces had already diminished when he made an offer of joint defense with India during the Sino-Indo clashes in October 1959 in Ladakh, in a move seen as a result of American pressure and a lack of understanding of foreign affairs Upon hearing this proposal, India's Prime Minister Jawaharlal Nehru reportedly countered, "Defence Minister Ayub: Joint Defence on what?" India remained uninterested in such proposals and Prime Minister Nehru decided to push his country's role in the Non-Aligned Movement. In 1960, President Ayub, together with Prime Minister Nehru, signed the Indus Waters Treaty brokered by the World Bank. In 1962, after India was defeated by China, Ayub Khan disguised a few thousand soldiers as guerillas and sent them to Indian Kashmir to incite the people to rebel. In 1964, the Pakistan Army engaged with the Indian Army in several skirmishes, and clandestine operations began.

The war with India in 1965 was a turning point in his presidency, and it ended in a settlement reached by Ayub Khan at Tashkent, called the Tashkent Declaration, which was facilitated by the Soviet Union. The settlement was perceived negatively by many Pakistanis and led Foreign Minister Zulfiqar Ali Bhutto to resign his post and take up opposition to Ayub Khan. According to diplomat Morrice James, "For them [Pakistanis] Ayub had betrayed the nation and had inexcusably lost face before the Indians."

According to Sartaj Aziz, deputy chairman of the Planning Commission, it was Foreign Minister Bhutto who had inadvertently set Pakistan on the road to war with India. During a cabinet meeting, Bhutto had gone on a populist anti-Indian and anti-American binge and succeeded in spellbinding President Ayub into thinking he was becoming a world statesman fawned upon by the enemies of the United States. When Ayub authorized Operation Gibraltar, the fomenting of a Kashmiri insurgency against India, Aziz famously told the President: "Sir, I hope you realise that our foreign policy and our economic requirements are not fully consistent, in fact they are rapidly falling out of line". Aziz opposed Operation Gibraltar, fearing the economical turmoil that would jolt the country's economy, but was in turn opposed by his own senior bureaucrats. In that meeting, Foreign Minister Bhutto convinced the president and the finance minister Muhammad Shoaib that India would not attack Pakistan due to Kashmir being a disputed territory, and per Bhutto's remarks: "Pakistan's incursion into Indian-occupied Kashmir, at [A]khnoor, would not provide [India] with the justification for attacking Pakistan across the international boundary because Kashmir was a disputed territory." This theory proved wrong, when India launched a full-scale war against West Pakistan in 1965.

Chief of the Army Staff General Musa Khan held off launching Operation Grand Slam, waiting for President Ayub Khan's go ahead. The operation didn't get underway until after the Indian Army had captured Haji Pir pass in Kashmir. He faced serious altercations with, and public criticism from, air chief Air Marshal Asghar Khan for hiding the details of the war. The Air Headquarters began fighting the president over the contingency plans, and this inter-services rivalry ended with Asghar Khan's resignation.

About the 1965 war's contingency plans, Air Marshal Nur Khan briefly wrote that "Rumours about an impending operation were rife but the army had not shared the plans with other forces."

Ayub Khan's main sponsor, the United States, did not welcome the move, and the Johnson administration placed an economic embargo that caused Pakistan to lose US$500 million in aid and grants that had been received through consortium. Ayub Khan could not politically survive in the aftermath of the 1965 war with India and fell from the presidency after surrendering presidential power to Army Commander General Yahya in 1969.

Afghanistan

In the 1950s, partly due to the complicated bilateral relations between Afghanistan and Pakistan over the Durand Line dispute, Ayub Khan along with the Royal family of Afghanistan under King Zahir Shah proposed the Afghanistan-Pakistan Confederation Plan to merge Afghanistan with Pakistan under a single confederation. This merger was proposed on the basis of mutual distrust and fears of security threats by the Indian government and the Soviets, which wasn't able to amount to fruition due to the eventual Soviet invasion of Afghanistan and the formation of a new communist Afghan regime.

=== 1965 presidential election ===
In 1964, President Ayub Khan was confident in his apparent popularity and saw the deep divisions within the political opposition which ultimately led him to announce presidential elections in 1965. He earned the nomination of the Pakistan Muslim League (PML) and was shocked when Fatima Jinnah was nominated by the Combined Opposition Parties.

Ayub Khan's son, Gohar Ayub Khan, launched attacks on Fatima Jinnah supporters. During this time, Ayub Khan used the Pakistani intelligence community for his own advantage. Military Intelligence actively monitored politicians and political gatherings and the Intelligence Bureau taped politicians' telephone conversations.

It was reported that the elections were widely rigged by the state authorities and machinery under the control of Ayub Khan and it is believed that had the elections been held via direct ballot, Fatima Jinnah would have won. The Electoral College consisted of only 80,000 Basic Democrats. They were easily manipulated by President Ayub Khan, who won the bitterly contested elections with 64% of the Electoral College vote. According to journalists of the time, the election did not conform to international standards; many viewed the election results with great suspicion.

=== 1969 protests and resignation ===
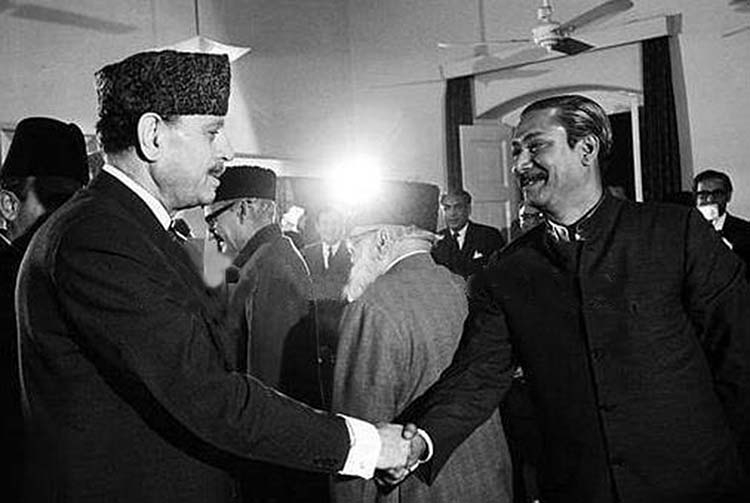
President Ayub and Sheikh Mujibur Rahman after the Round Table Conference in Rawalpindi, 26 February 1969

The controversial victory over Fatima Jinnah in the 1965 presidential election and the outcome of the war with India in the same year brought devastating results for Ayub Khan's image and his presidency. Khan's foreign minister Zulfikar Ali Bhutto believed the Tashkent Declaration was a "political surrender" which turned a military victory into defeat. Bhutto began criticizing Ayub Khan openly and resigned in June 1966. In Karachi, public resentment towards Ayub had been rising since the 1965 elections and his policies were widely disapproved.

In 1967, Bhutto formed the Pakistan People's Party (PPP) and embarked on a nationwide tour where he attacked the Ayub administration's economic, religious, and social policies. Bhutto was arrested for these activities. His detention further inflamed the opposition, and demonstrations were sparked all over the country. The East Pakistani Awami League charged the Ayub administration with discriminatory policies towards the East. Labour unions called for strikes against Ayub Khan's administration, and dissatisfaction was widespread in the country's middle class by the end of 1968. When Ayub Khan was confronted with the Six point movement led by Sheikh Mujibur Rahman and with the criticism by Bhutto's PPP, he responded by imprisoning both leaders but that made matters worse for Ayub's administration.

In 1969, Ayub Khan opened negotiations with the opposition parties in what was termed as a "Round Table Conference" where he held talks with all major opposition parties. However, these discussions yielded no results and strong anti-Ayub demonstrations calling for his resignation were sparked all over the country. During this time, Ayub Khan survived a near-fatal cardiac arrest that put him out of the office, and later survived a paralysis attack that put him in a wheelchair. The police were unable to maintain Law and order in Pakistan, especially in East Pakistan where riots and a serious uprising were quelled. At one point, Home and Defence Minister Vice-Admiral Rahman told journalists that the "country was under the mob rule and that police were not strong enough to tackle the situation."

Elements in the military began supporting the opposition political parties; it was this that finally brought about the demise of Ayub Khan's era. On 25 March 1969, President Ayub Khan resigned from office and invited the commander-in-chief of the army General Yahya Khan to take over control of the country.

Asghar Khan and Khyber Khan were considered among the likely successors to President Ayub Khan during the collapse of his regime. Khyber was described as "a young, energetic, and popular air force officer in his early forties, who happens to look very much like a younger Ayub Khan."

== Death and legacy ==
=== Death ===
Ayub Khan died of a heart attack on 19 April 1974 at his villa near Islamabad at age 66.

=== Foreign policy ===
Ayub Khan's presidency allied Pakistan with the American-led military alliance against the Soviet Union which helped Pakistan develop its strong economic background and its long-term political and strategic relations with the United States. Major economic aid and trade from the United States and European Communities ultimately led Pakistan's industrial sector to develop rapidly but the consequences of cartelization included increased inequality in the distribution of wealth. After 1965, he became extremely concerned about the arrogance and bossiness of the US over the direction of Pakistan's foreign policy when the US publicly criticized Pakistan for building ties with China and the Soviet Union; he authored a book over this issue known as Friends not Masters.

=== Diary ===
Ayub Khan began his diary in September 1966 and ended his recordings in October 1972 due to his failing health. The diary covers events such as his resignation from office, the assumption of power by Yahya Khan, the independence of Bangladesh, and the replacement of Yahya by Zulfikar Ali Bhutto. After he died in 1974, the diary was not released to the public for thirty years due to opinions that would have been detrimental to the reputation of powerful individuals at the time. Ayub Khan wanted his diary to be edited by his close associate Altaf Gauhar, but after Ayub Khan's death, the six-year-long diary was entrusted to Oxford University Press (OUP) to edit and publish. At OUP, Diaries of Field Marshal Mohammad Ayub Khan, 1966–1972 was edited and annotated by American historian Craig Baxter.

=== Development projects ===
The federal capital was relocated under the Ayub administration from the port city of Karachi to the new and carefully planned city of Islamabad in the mountains in 1965. Facilitated by the World Bank, the Ayub administration became a party to the Indus Waters Treaty with archrival India to resolve disputes regarding the sharing of the waters of the six rivers in the Punjab Doab that flow between the two countries. Khan's administration also built a major network of irrigation canals, high-water dams, and thermal and hydroelectric power stations.

=== Modernization of agriculture and industrialization ===
He subsidized fertilizers and modernized agriculture through irrigation development and spurred industrial growth with liberal tax benefits. In the decade of his rule, the GNP rose by 45% and manufactured goods began to overtake such traditional exports as jute and cotton. However, the economists in the Planning Commission alleged that his policies were tailored to reward the elite families and major landowners in the country. In 1968, his administration celebrated the so-called "Decade of Development" when the mass protests erupted all over the country due to an increasingly greater divide between the rich and the poor.

=== Global policy ===
He was one of the signatories of the agreement to convene a convention for drafting a world constitution. As a result, for the first time in human history, a World Constituent Assembly convened to draft and adopt a Constitution for the Federation of Earth.

== Criticisms ==
=== Despotism, nepotism and corruption ===
After 1965, the corruption in government, nepotism, and suppression of free speech, thought, and press increased unrest and turmoil in the country against the Ayub administration. The 1965 presidential election, where Ayub Khan was opposed by Fatima Jinnah, was allegedly rigged. In 2003, the nephew of the Quaid-i-Azam, Akbar Pirbhai, re-ignited the controversy by suggesting that Fatima Jinnah's death in 1967 was an assassination by the Ayub Khan establishment. Sherbaz Khan Mazari criticised Gohar Ayub Khan for leading a victory parade after the 1965 election into the heart of opposition territory in Karachi, despite the prohibition, under Section 144, of holding processions there. Fierce clashes ensued, resulting in many deaths. He was faced with allegations of widespread intentional vote riggings, organizing political murders in Karachi. His peace with India was considered by many Pakistanis an embarrassing compromise.

Gohar Ayub Khan also faced criticisms during that time on questions of family corruption and cronyism through his business links with his father-in-law, retired Lieutenant General Habibullah Khan Khattak. One Western commentator in 1969 estimated Gohar Ayub's personal wealth at the time at $4 million, while his family's wealth was put in the range of $10–20 million. Public criticism of Gohar's personal wealth and that of the President increased. All these criticisms harmed President Ayub Khan's image.

=== Mishandling of East Pakistan ===
He is also blamed for not doing enough to tackle the significant economic disparity between East and West Pakistan. Whilst he was aware of the acute grievances of East Pakistan, he did try to address the situation. However, the Ayub Khan regime was so highly centralized that, in the absence of democratic institutions, densely populated and politicized East Pakistan province continued to feel it was being slighted.

During his presidency, differences between West and East Pakistan arose to an enormous degree, that ultimately led to the independence of Bangladesh following the Bangladesh Liberation War.

=== Weakening of constitutional government ===
On 13 May 2024, Minister of Defence Khawaja Asif delivered a speech on the floor of the National Assembly of Pakistan in which he stated that Ayub was the first dictator who violated the Constitution of Pakistan and overthrew a democratically elected government; hence, Ayub was the root cause of all the confusion and chaos which ensued. Minister Asif supported the demand(s) for Article 6 proceedings against violators of the Constitution of Pakistan. Consequently, Minister Asif called for the corpse of dictator Ayub to be dug out of his grave and be hung for the offence of high treason in accordance with Article 6 of the Constitution of Pakistan.

== Personal life ==
Ayub was married to Zaidi Khatoon and they had four sons and two daughters. His son, Gohar Ayub Khan, served as a foreign minister. Ayub's daughter Nasim did not enter politics and married Miangul Aurangzeb, the Wali of Swat. Another son, Shaukat, was a businessman and had four children: three sons, Akbar, Arshad, Yousaf, and one daughter. His grandsons, Omar and Yousaf are also politicians.

His health began to deteriorate in early 1968. In late January 1968, he contracted influenza, which led to viral pneumonia, and by the third week of February he had a pulmonary embolism.

In its obituary, The New York Times described him as "an imposing figure, he was 6 feet 2 inches tall and weighed over 200 pounds. His brush mustache and clipped British accent augmented his military bearing."

== Awards and decorations ==
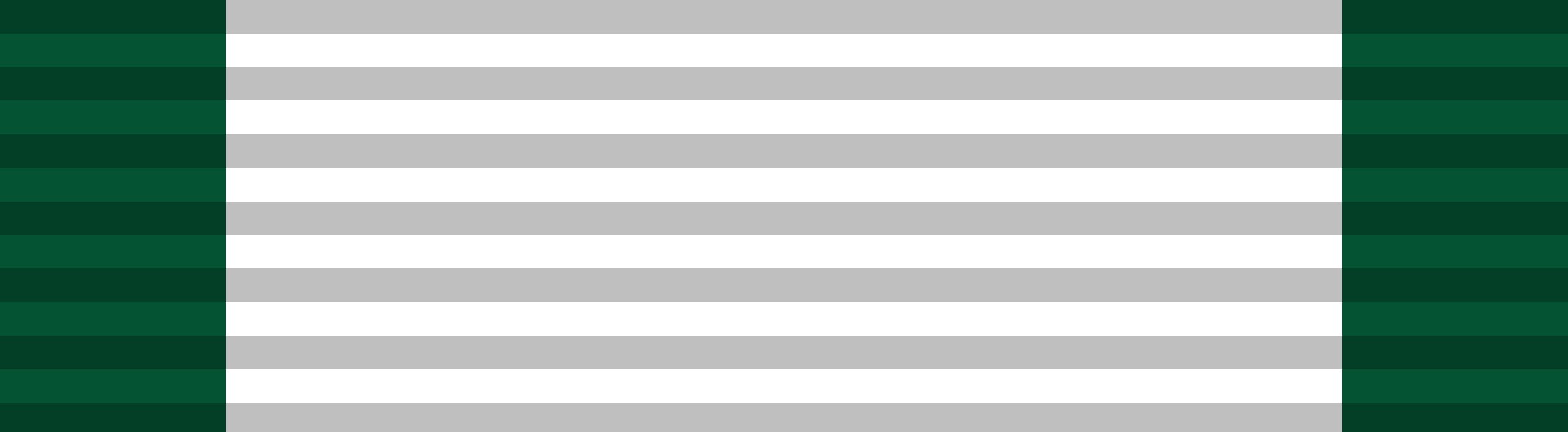

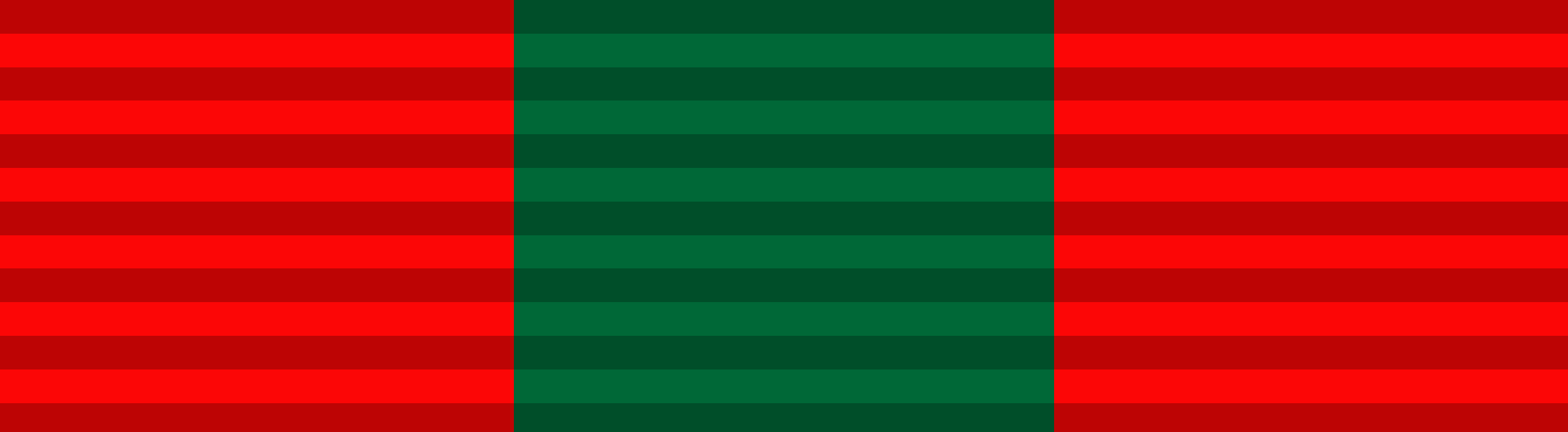

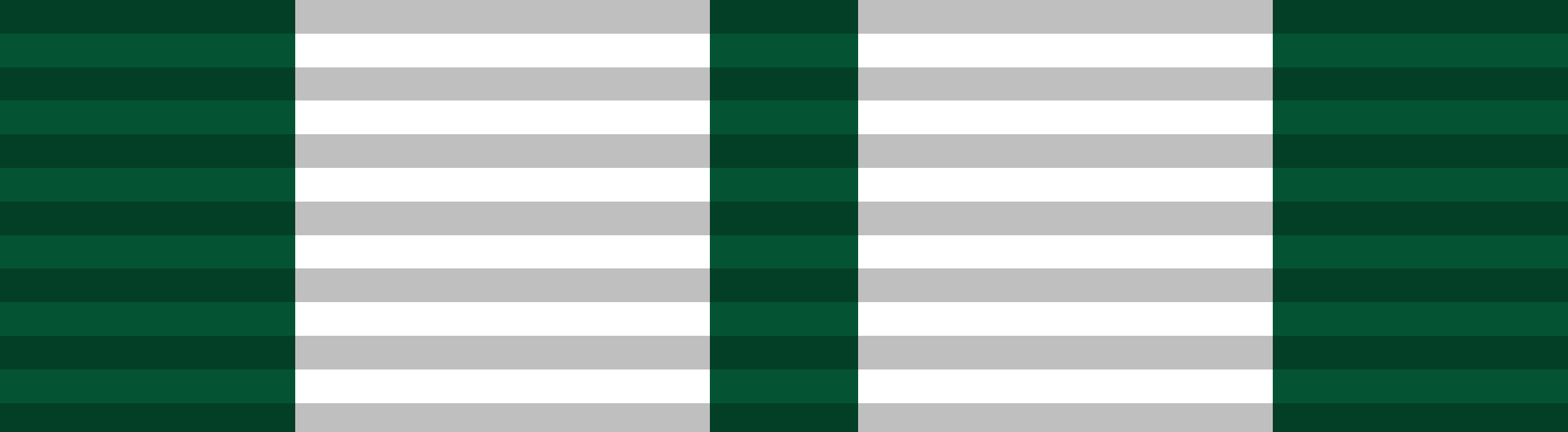

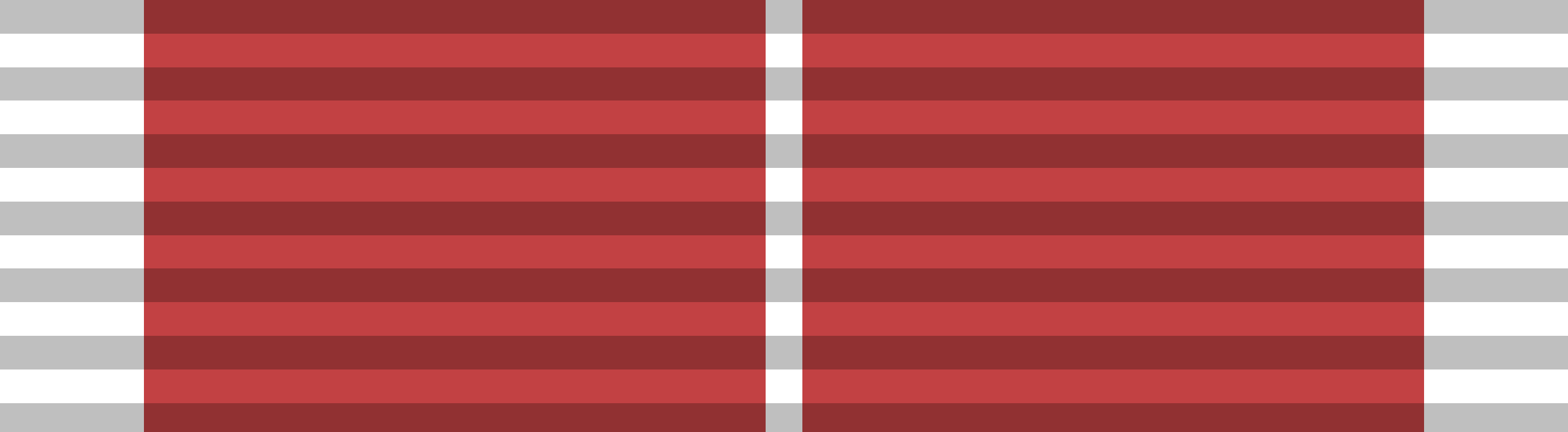

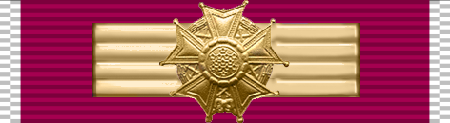

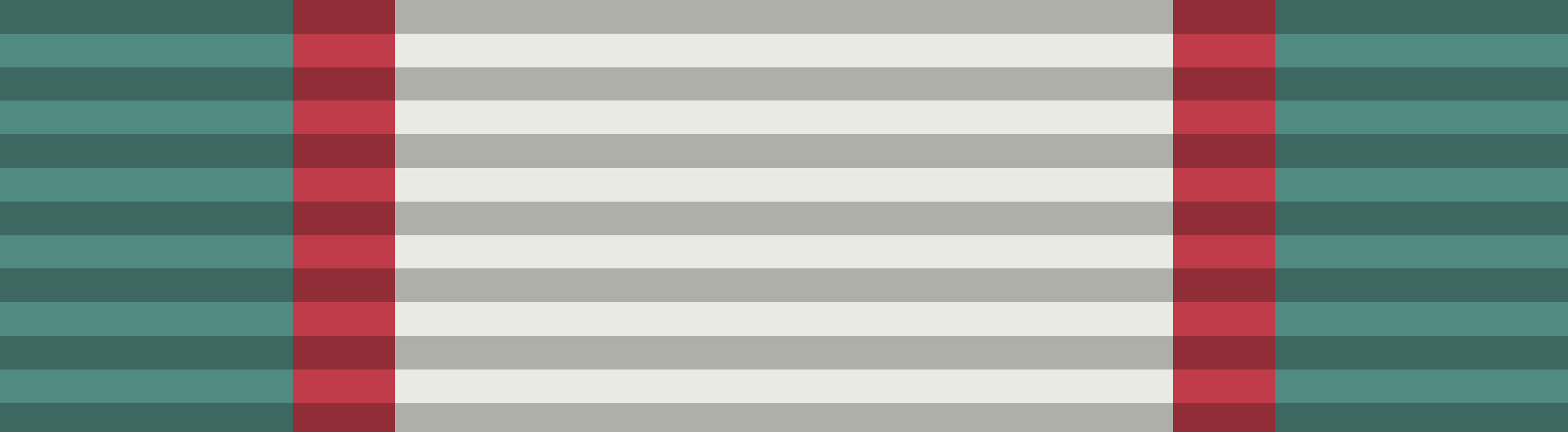

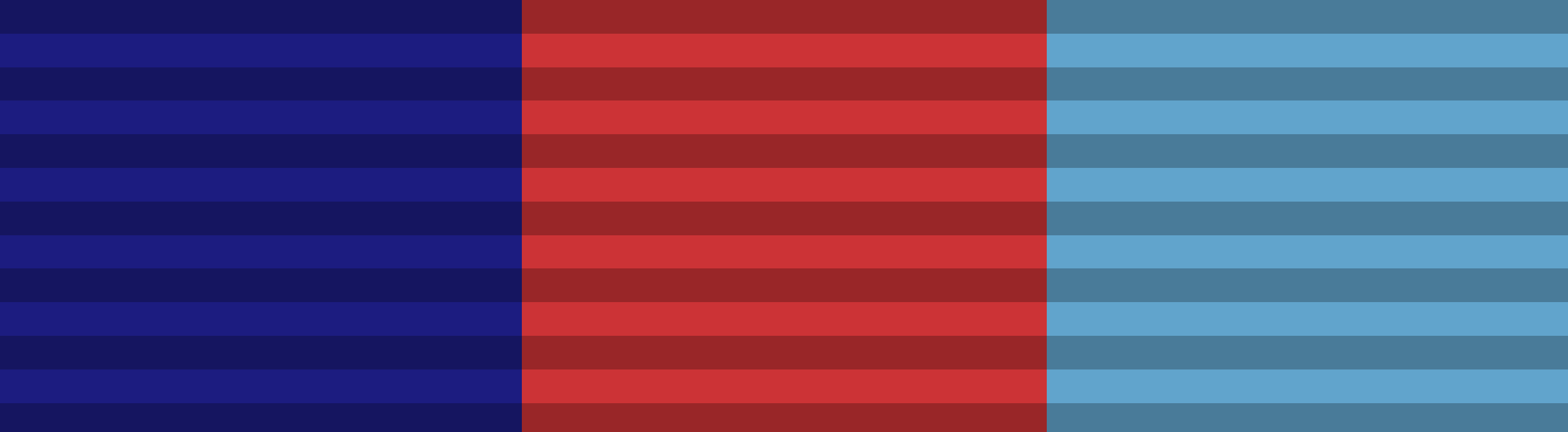

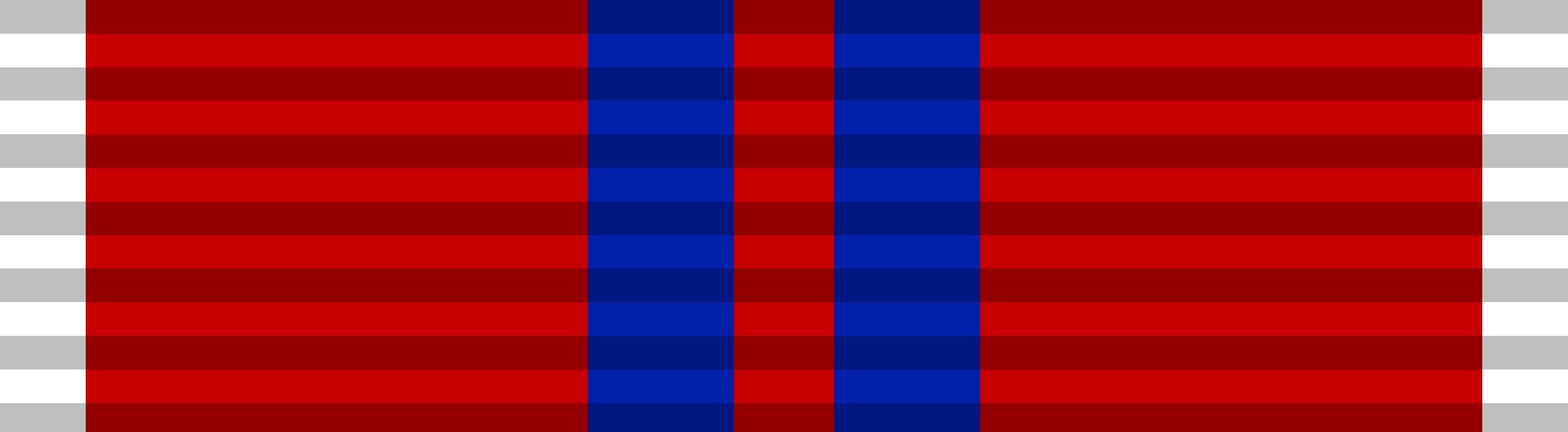

	Nishan-e-Pakistan (Order of Pakistan)		
Hilal-e-Jurat (Crescent of Courage)	Hilal-e-Pakistan (HPk)	Pakistan Medal (Pakistan Tamgha) 1947	Tamgha-e-Qayam-e-Jamhuria (Republic Commemoration Medal) 1956
Member of the Most Excellent Order of the British Empire (MBE)	Legion of Merit (Degree of Chief Commander) (US)	India General Service Medal (1936)	1939–1945 Star
Burma Star	War Medal 1939–1945	India Service Medal 1939–1945	Queen Elizabeth II Coronation Medal (1953)

=== Foreign Decorations ===
Foreign Awards
UK	Order of St Michael and St George
UK	Member of the Most Excellent Order of the British Empire (MBE)
US	Legion of Merit (Degree of Chief Commander)
UK	India General Service Medal (1936)
UK	1939–1945 Star
UK	Burma Star
UK	War Medal 1939–1945
UK	India Service Medal 1939–1945
UK	Queen Elizabeth II Coronation Medal
THA	Knight Grand Commander of the Order of Rama
YUG	Order of the Yugoslav Great Star

== Honours ==
=== National honours ===
- Pakistan:
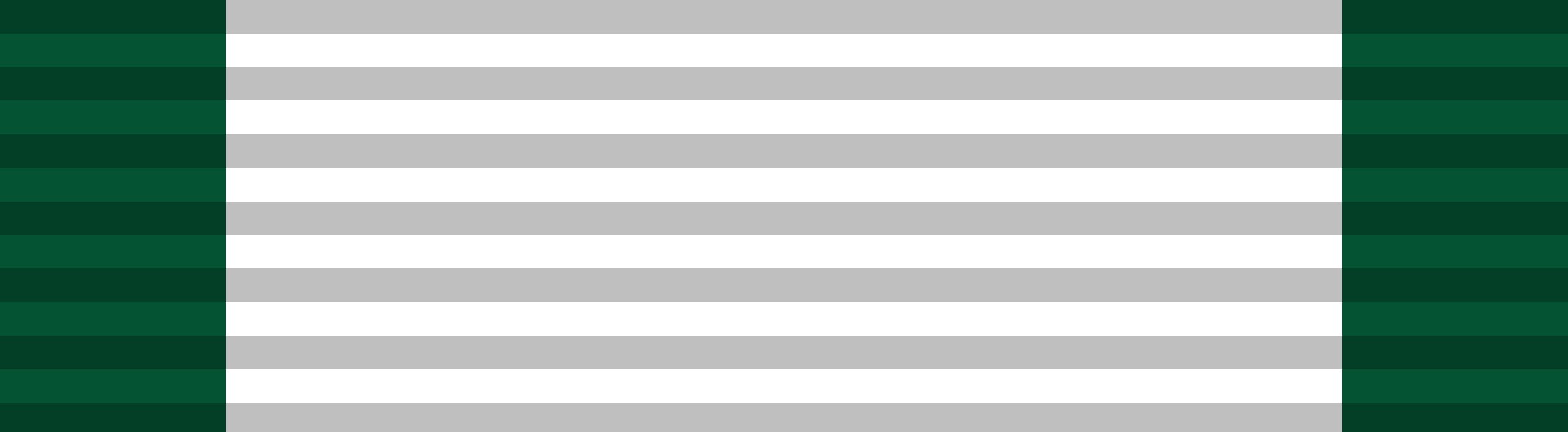
  - Recipient of the Nishan-e-Pakistan (NPk)
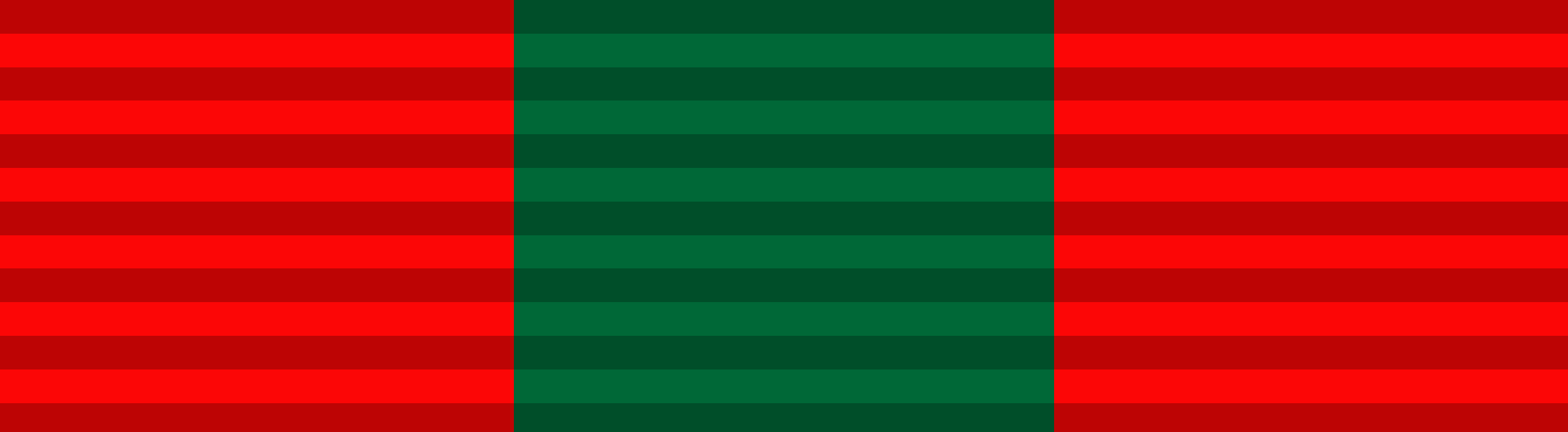
  - Recipient of the Hilal-e-Jurat (HJ)
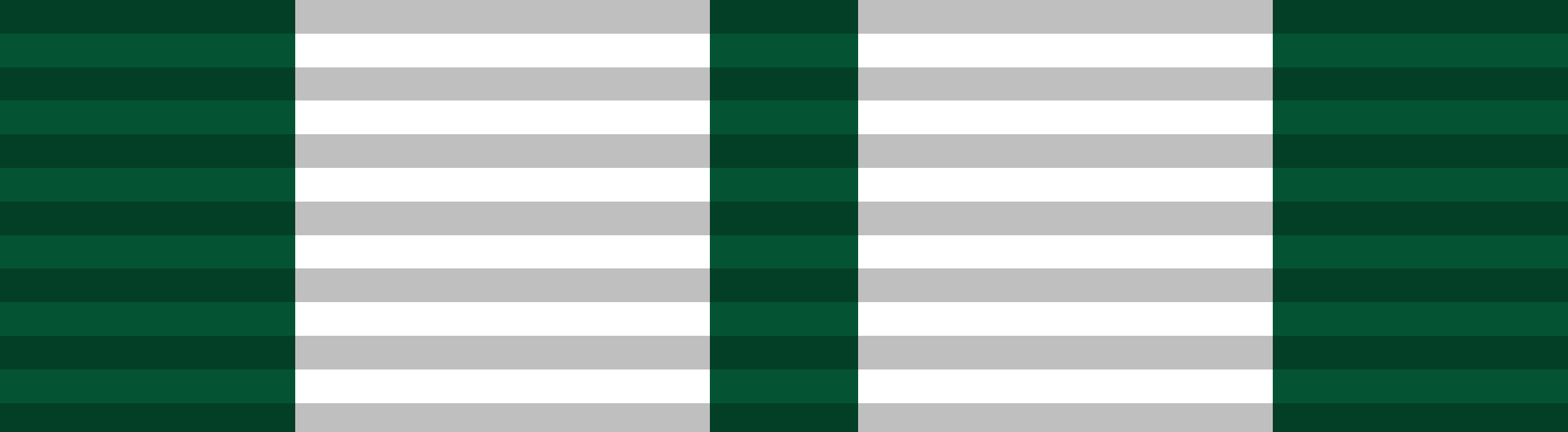
  - Recipient of the Hilal-e-Pakistan (HPk)

=== Foreign honours ===
- British India:
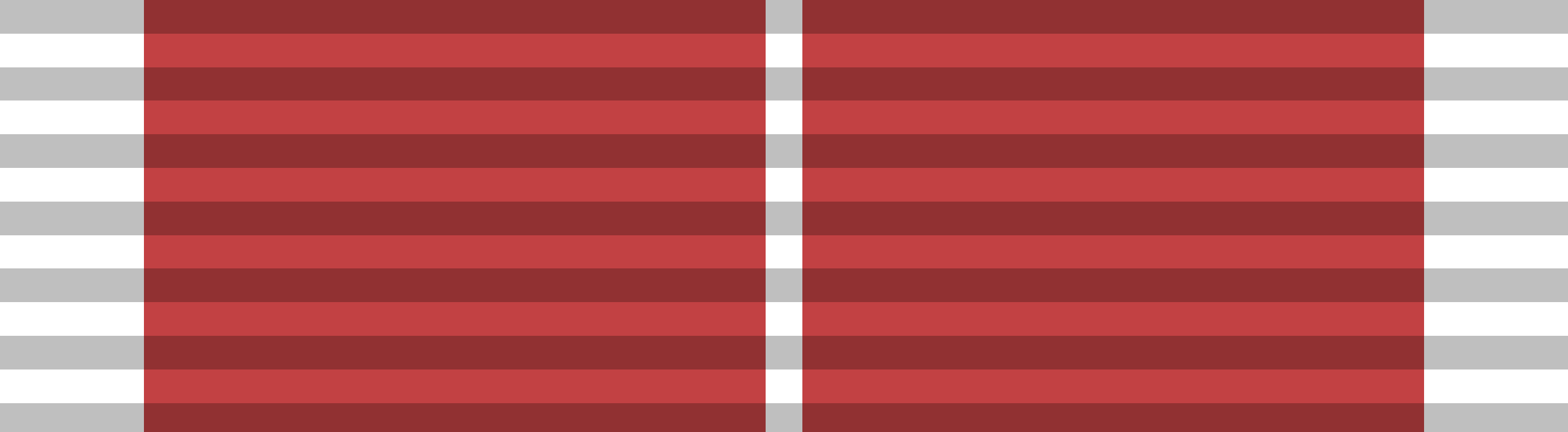
  - Member of the Most Excellent Order of the British Empire (MBE)
- Nepal:
  - Order of Ojaswi Rajanya
- Indonesia:
  - First Class of the Star of the Republic of Indonesia (1960)
- United Kingdom:
  - Honorary Knight Grand Cross of the Order of St Michael and St George (GCMG) (1961)
  - Recipient of the Royal Victorian Chain (1966)
- Malaya:
  - Honorary Recipient of the Order of the Crown of the Realm (D.M.N.(K)) (1962)

== Books ==
Among the books Ayub Khan authored or which were based on his speeches, talks and other output, are:

=== Authored ===
- Friends Not Masters: A Political Autobiography, Karachi: Oxford University Press, 1967.
- Ideology and Objectives, Rawalpindi: Ferozesons, 1968.
- Agricultural Revolution in Pakistan, Karachi: Rana Tractors & Equipment, 1968.

=== Edited by others ===
- Diaries of Field Marshal Mohammad Ayub Khan, 1966–1972, Karachi: Oxford University Press, 2007. Edited by Craig Baxter.
- Field Marshal Mohammad Ayub Khan: A Selection of Talks and Interviews, 1964–1967, Karachi: Oxford University Press, 2010. Edited by Nadia Ghani.

== See also ==
- Cold War
- Ayub National Park
- Ayub Medical College
- Americanism
- American cultural influence in Pakistan

== Notes ==
Footnotes

== Bibliography ==
- Cloughly, Brian (2006). "Chapter 2, "Ayub Khan, Adjutant General to President"". A History of the Pakistan Army. Oxford University Press. ISBN 978-1-57607-712-2.
- Haqqani, Husain (2010). Pakistan: Between Mosque and Military. Carnegie Endowment. ISBN 978-0-87003-285-1.
- Khan, Muhammad Ayub (1966). Diaries of Field Marshal Mohammad Ayub Khan. Karachi: Oxford University Press. p. 599. ISBN 978-0-19-547442-8.
- Khan, Muhammad Ayub (1967). Friends Not Masters. Oxford University Press. ISBN 0-19-211178-7.
- Shah, Aqil (2014). Military and Democracy: Military Politics in Pakistan. Harvard University Press. ISBN 978-1-134-40758-3.

Military offices
Preceded by General Gracey	C-in-C of the Pakistan Army; 1951–1958	Succeeded by General Musa Khan
Political offices
Preceded by Muhammad Ali Bogra	Defence Minister of Pakistan; 1954–1955	Succeeded by Chaudhry Muhammad Ali
Preceded by Iskander Mirza	President of Pakistan; 1958–1969	Succeeded by Yahya Khan
Preceded by Iskander Mirza	Chief Martial Law Administrator; 1958–1969	Succeeded by Yahya Khan
Preceded by Muhammad Ayub Khuhro	Defence Minister of Pakistan; 1958–1966	Succeeded by Afzal Rahman Khan
Preceded by Khan Habibullah Khan	Minister of the Interior; 1965	Succeeded by Chaudhry Ali Akbar Khan
