= Commerce Secretary of Pakistan =

Administrative post of the Ministry of Commerce

- معتمدِ تجارت پاکستان
- Appointer: Prime Minister of Pakistan
- Website: Ministry of Commerce

The Commerce Secretary of Pakistan (Urdu: معتمدِ تجارت پاکستان) is the Federal Secretary for the Ministry of Commerce. The position holder is a BPS-22 grade officer, usually belonging to the Pakistan Administrative Service. The Commerce Secretary is considered to be a coveted position in the Government of Pakistan with various public sector entities under his charge including Trading Corporation of Pakistan (TCP), State Life Insurance Corporation (SLIC), Trade Development Authority (TDAP) and National Insurance Corporation Limited (NICL). The position holder is a BPS-22 grade officer, usually belonging to the Pakistan Administrative Service. The current Commerce Secretary is Muhammad Sualeh Ahmad Faruqi.

Other organisations under the administrative control of the Commerce Secretary include Pakistan Reinsurance Company Limited (PRCL), Pakistan Tobacco Board (PTB) and Pakistan Tariff Commission (PTC).

== See also ==
- Government of Pakistan
- Federal Secretary
- Interior Secretary of Pakistan
- Cabinet Secretary of Pakistan
- Finance Secretary of Pakistan
- Petroleum Secretary of Pakistan
- Ministry of Commerce and Textile Industry
- Trading Corporation of Pakistan
