= CNIC (Pakistan) =

National identity card of Pakistan

Computerised National Identity Card (CNIC)
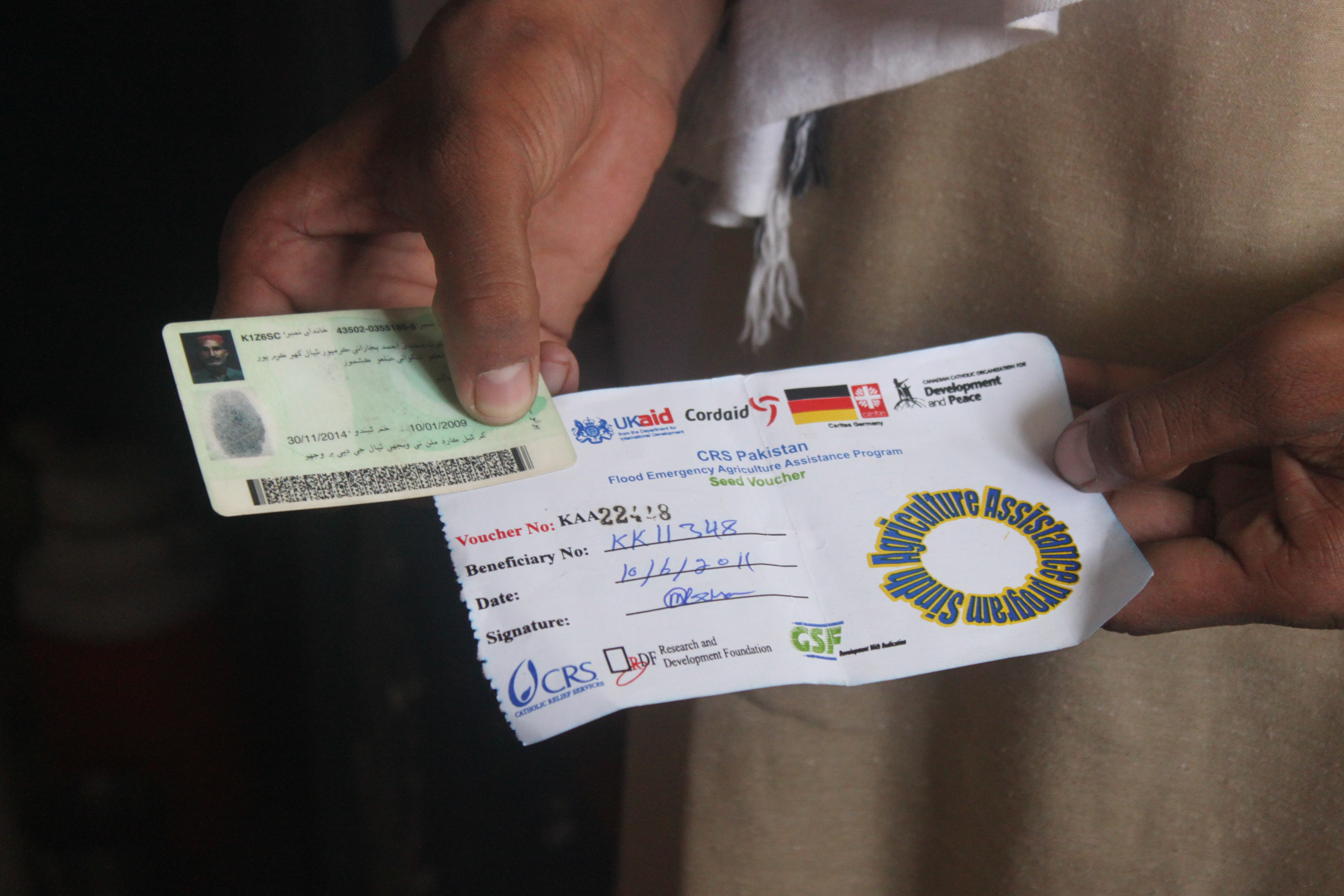
- A identity card entitles to a flood relief voucher.
- Type: Identity document
- Issued by: National Database and Registration Authority (NADRA)
- First issued: 1973 (paper-based); 2000 (computerised card); 2012 (smart card)
- Purpose: Identification; Direct benefit transfers; Insurance; Bank accounts; Passports
- Valid in: Pakistan
- Eligibility: Pakistani citizenship
- Expiration: 10 years (no expiry after bearer has exceeded 60 years of age)
- Cost: Different Rates

The computerised national identity card (CNIC) (Urdu: قومی شناختی کارڈ, romanised: qaumī śanāxtī kārḍ) is an identity card with a unique 13-digit number available to all adult citizens of Pakistan and their diasporic counterparts, obtained voluntarily. It includes biometric data such as 10 fingerprints, 2 iris prints, and a facial photo. The process of data collection and card issuance is conducted by the National Database and Registration Authority (NADRA), an autonomous body under the Federal Ministry of Interior, with the requisite autonomy to collect and maintain data independently.

The CNIC includes details such as legal name, gender (male, female, or transgender), father's name (or husband's name for married women), identification mark, date of birth, national ID card number, family tree ID number, current and permanent addresses, issue and expiry dates, signature, photo, and thumbprint (fingerprint).

Though not mandatory by law, the CNIC is essential for numerous transactions in Pakistan, including voting, passport applications, land and vehicle purchases, driver's license acquisition, ticket bookings, mobile SIM card acquisition, utility services access, education and healthcare access, and financial transactions.

== History ==
Efforts to establish a national ID system in Pakistan began in 1973, following the enactment of Article 30 of the Second Amendment. This initiative aimed to collect demographic data, addresses, photographs, and thumb impressions from citizens for the purpose of maintaining a statistical database. However, the process relied on physical files and lacked the adoption of emerging technologies by the Directorate General of Registration. As a result, the government's ability to provide a reliable document for ID verification was limited.

In 1999 the Pakistan Army, tasked with conducting a nationwide census, began considering merging two institutions: the Directorate General of Registration, responsible for issuing national ID cards, and the National Database Organization, established in 1998 for census purposes. This merger aimed to computerise census data collection and use it for issuing computerised cards. The National Database and Registration Authority (NADRA) Ordinance, 2000, effective from 10 March 2000, formalised this merger, combining the functions of both entities. The goal was to streamline the process of registering individuals and issuing biometric data based national ID cards while reducing government intervention. The Computerised National Identity Card (CNIC) contains a 13-digit unique ID, a photo, signature, and a microchip storing iris scans and fingerprints.

In 2007 NADRA began implementing fingerprint deduplication for national ID card issuance. By 2008, the data architecture was enhanced to include a full set of 10 fingerprints and a digital photograph. This technology proved highly effective in deduplicating the national database, significantly reducing instances of dual IDs and identity theft.

In October 2012 NADRA introduced the Smart National ID Card with enhanced security features to deter forgery and broaden its application in government services. Compliant with international standards, ICAO standard 9303 and ISO standard 7816-4, it incorporates a data chip, 36 security features, and a match-on-card applet, enhancing smart card authentication security by storing ID data on the card itself.

== Challenges ==
NADRA faced significant challenges in issuing ID cards due to limited technical capabilities from 2001 to 2005. To address this, they expanded their presence by setting up offices in every district and implementing mobile infrastructure to reach remote areas. With these improvements, registration surged from 54 million in 2008 to 98 million in 2014, with approximately 55 million men and 43 million women enrolled.

In relation, the percentage might be small, but many millions face challenges in obtaining this card, leaving them vulnerable. Studies indicate that women and children of unregistered parents are at risk of human trafficking and forced labour due to their inability to obtain CNICs or birth certificates. To address this issue, mobile registration units with female staff and simplified processes to assist vulnerable groups ensuring better inclusion.

== CNIC codes ==
The 13-digit CNIC number is entirely different for every Pakistani. The number has three parts. The first part, which comprises five digits i.e. '12101', has its first digit '1' identifying the province or administrative unit of Pakistan. People whose CNIC number starts with 1, are residents of Khyber Pakhtunkhwa province, similarly, 2 represents FATA, 3 for Punjab, 4 for Sindh, 5 represents Balochistan, 6 for Islamabad and 7 represents Gilgit-Baltistan. The second digit in the CNIC number shows the division, which means every a digit identifies a different division in a province, while the rest of the three digit represent the district, tehsil and union council. The second and middle part of the CNIC number, which consists of seven digits separated by hyphens i.e. XXXXX-1234567-X, is basically a code for the family number of a citizen. This code forms the family tree of a citizen. The third part following a hyphen (last digit), represents sex of a person. For a man, odd digits i.e. 1, 3, 5, 7, 9 are used, while even digits i.e. 0, 2, 4, 6, 8 are used for women.

CNIC codes of Pakistani administrative units

- Khyber Pakhtunkhwa – 1XXXX-XXXXXXX-X
  - FATA (now merged into Khyber Pakhtunkhwa) – 2XXXX-XXXXXXX-X
- Punjab, Pakistan – 3XXXX-XXXXXXX-X
- Sindh – 4XXXX-XXXXXXX-X
- Balochistan – 5XXXX-XXXXXXX-X

CNIC code of capital territory

- Islamabad – 6XXXX-XXXXXXX-X

CNIC code of administered sectors of Kashmir

- Gilgit Baltistan – 7XXXX-XXXXXXX-X
- Azad Kashmir – 8XXXX-XXXXXXX-X

CNIC code for Divisions

Divisions of Khyber Pakhtunkhwa

- Bannu Division (excluded ex FATA) – 11XXX-XXXXXXX-X
- Dera Ismail Khan Division (excluded ex FATA) – 12XXX-XXXXXXX-X
- Hazara Division – 13XXX-XXXXXXX-X
- Kohat Division (excluded ex FATA) – 14XXX-XXXXXXX-X
- Malakand Division (excluded ex FATA) – 15XXX-XXXXXXX-X
- Mardan Division – 16XXX-XXXXXXX-X
- Peshawar Division (excluded ex FATA) – 17XXX-XXXXXXX-X

Divisions of Punjab

- Bahawalpur Division – 31XXX-XXXXXXX-X
- Dera Ghazi Khan Division – 32XXX-XXXXXXX-X
- Faisalabad Division – 33XXX-XXXXXXX-X
- Gujranwala Division & Gujrat Division – 34XXX-XXXXXXX-X
- Lahore Division – 35XXX-XXXXXXX-X
- Multan Division & Sahiwal Division – 36XXX-XXXXXXX-X
- Rawalpindi Division – 37XXX-XXXXXXX-X
- Sargodha Division & Mianwali Division – 38XXX-XXXXXXX-X

Divisions of Sindh

- Hyderabad Division – 41XXX-XXXXXXX-X
- Karachi Division – 42XXX-XXXXXXX-X
- Larkana Division – 43XXX-XXXXXXX-X
- Mirpur Khas Division – 44XXX-XXXXXXX-X
- Sukkur Division & Shaheed Benazirabad Division – 45XXX-XXXXXXX-X

Divisions of Balochistan

- Kalat Division & Rakhshan Division – 51XXX-XXXXXXX-X
- Makran Division – 52XXX-XXXXXXX-X
- Nasirabad Division – 53XXX-XXXXXXX-X
- Quetta Division – 54XXX-XXXXXXX-X
- Sibi Division – 55XXX-XXXXXXX-X
- Zhob Division & Loralai Division – 56XXX-XXXXXXX-X

Islamabad Capital Territory

- Islamabad – 61XXX-XXXXXXX-X

Divisions of Gilgit-Baltistan

- 71XXX-XXXXXXX-X for all three divisions of Gilgit Baltistan: Gilgit Division, Baltistan Division & Diamer Division

Divisions of Azad Kashmir

- Mirpur Division – 81XXX-XXXXXXX-X
- Poonch Division & Muzaffarabad Division – 82XXX-XXXXXXX-X

== Contents ==
Starting in 2012, the card includes essential personal information, including:

Front side

	Feature	Explanation details
1	Name	Given name, family name: in English and Urdu.
2	Father's name	Given name, family name in English and Urdu. (Husband's name for married females)
3	Gender	containing one character for M (male), F (female), or X (transgender)
4	Country of stay	
5	Identity number	A unique 13-digit number
6	Date of birth	listed in the Gregorian calendar format, in DDMMYY
7	Photo of the individual	
8	Date of issue	
9	Date of expiry	written as Lifetime for above 60-year-old
10	Holder's Signature	

Back side

	Feature	Explanation Details
1	Present address	
2	Permanent address	
3	QR code	
4	Card serial number	
5	Card holder's name→ is entitled visa free entry into Pakistan.	NICOP and POC only
6	Machine-readable	NICOP and POC only

== Citizens who live abroad ==
Pakistani citizens living abroad have the option to apply for NICOP, also known as the National Identity Card for Overseas Pakistanis, serving as a registration document. Initially, it was exclusively granted to individuals residing abroad for six months or holding dual nationalities. But the eligibility criteria have since expanded to include all Pakistani citizens. Furthermore, those with ties to Pakistan, such as marriage to a CNIC or NICOP holder, can opt for a Pakistan Origin Card (POC).

== Data breach ==
In 2020 a data breach was alleged which was said to include 115 million national identity numbers and the addresses of Pakistani mobile users. The CNIC database is reportedly accessible by 300 public and private service providers. In March 2024, it emerged that the sensitive personal data of approximately 2.7 million Pakistanis had been compromised from NADRA's database, notably from the Multan, Karachi, and Peshawar offices.

Leaked personal information can lead to harassment and blackmail, particularly affecting vulnerable groups like women, journalists, activists, and minorities. Due to a missing data protection law, there is no accountability for such breaches.
