= Pervaiz Iqbal Cheema =

Pakistani political scientist (1940–2019)

- Born: Pervaiz Iqbal Cheema; Sialkot, Pakistan
- Died: 16 February 2019 (aged 79); Islamabad, Pakistan
- Education: University of Aberdeen

Pervaiz Iqbal Cheema (1940 – 16 February 2019) was a Pakistani political scientist, cricketer, professor of International Relations, and dean of the Faculty of Contemporary Studies, National Defence University, Islamabad - Pakistan.

He studied at Murray College and later played three first-class cricket matches for Lahore.

== Early life and education ==
Pervaiz Iqbal Cheema was born in 1940 at Sialkot, Punjab, British India and was initially educated at Sialkot. Later he moved to Government College, Lahore, where he completed his Master of Arts degree in history. He also received a Master of Arts degree in political science from Punjab University, Lahore. He received a diploma in international relations from Vienna University (Austria), M. Litt. in strategic studies from Aberdeen University (UK) and a Ph.D. degree from Quaid-i-Azam University (Pakistan).

== Career ==
Cheema was a teacher and a researcher for more than 45 years both inside Pakistan as well as abroad. Inside Pakistan, he had taught at Government College (Lahore), Pakistan Administrative Staff College (Lahore), Quaid-i-Azam University, (Islamabad), and National Defence University, Pakistan (Islamabad). He worked at Islamabad Policy Research Institute (Islamabad). Abroad, he had worked in various capacities like research fellow, Senior Fulbright scholar, visiting scholar for Australian National University (Australia), School of Advanced International Studies, Johns Hopkins University (US), Institute of Southeast Asian Studies, (Singapore), and University of Illinois at Urbana-Champaign (US).

As a visiting lecturer, he also delivered lectures at many professional and training institutions including National Defence College (now called National Defence University (Islamabad), Command and Staff College (Quetta), Joint Staff College (Rawalpindi), Foreign Service Training Institute (Islamabad), Information Services Academy (Islamabad), Allama Iqbal Open University (Islamabad), Pakistan Administrative Staff College (renamed now as National Management College, Islamabad).

During his long stay at Quaid-i-Azam University, Cheema served as the Chairman of International Relations Department as well as Defence and Strategic Studies Department for more than 14 years. Since 2009, Cheema had been working at the National Defense University as a Dean, Faculty of Contemporary Studies, Islamabad.

Pervaiz Iqbal Cheema participated in more than 215 National and International Seminars/Conferences/Workshops. He was a member of many International and National Academic Associations. He also had served on the Editorial Advisory Board of many International and National Academic Journals.

== Awards and recognition ==
- Pride of Performance Award by the President of Pakistan in 2013.

== Publications ==
Cheema's wrote a number of articles and books on South Asian politics.

=== Authored ===
- Quaid-i-Azam as a Strategist, Research and Publication Committee, Department of International Relations, Quaid-i-Azam University, Islamabad, 1977, Pakistan.
- Restraints in Korean War, Research and Publication Committee, Department of International Relations, Quaid-i-Azam University, Islamabad, 1978, Pakistan.
- Sanctuary and War, Quaid-i-Azam University, Islamabad, 1978, Pakistan.
- Conflict and Cooperation in the Indian Ocean: Pakistan's Interests and Choices, Canberra Papers on Strategy and Defence No.23, Strategic and Defence Studies Centre, The Research School of Pacific Studies, The Australian National University, Canberra, 1980, Australia.
- Afghanistan Since April 1978, Research and Publication Committee, Department of International Relations, Quaid-i-Azam University, Islamabad, 1980, Pakistan.
- Pakistan's Defence Policy 1947-58 (Macmillan, London, U.K. 1990)
- The Armed Forces of Pakistan (Allen & Unwin, Sydney. Also published by the New York University Press, 2002).
- The Politics of the Punjab Boundary Award (Heidelberg paper No.1, South Asia Institute, Department of Political Science, University of Heidelberg, September 2000).

=== Co-authored ===
- Brasstacks and Beyond: Perception and Management of Crisis in South Asia (Co-author), ACDIS Research Report, Programme in Arms Control, Disarmament and International Security, University of Illinois at Urbana-Champaign, USA, 1995.
- Nuclear Non-Proliferation in India and Pakistan: South Asian Perspectives (Co-author) Regional Centre for Strategic Studies, (Colombo, Sri Lanka) Manohar Publishers, New Delhi (India), 1996.
- Defence Expenditure in South Asia: An Overview (Co-author), RCSS Policy Studies 10, Regional Centre for Strategic Studies,(Colombo, Sri Lanka), March 2000.
- The Simla Agreement 1972: Its Wasted Promise (Co-Author), Regional Centre for Strategic Studies, Colombo, Sri Lanka, 2001.
- Perceptions, Politics and Security of South Asia: The Compound Crisis of 90 (Co-author), Routledge Curzon, London, 2003.
- Four Crises and a Peace Process: American Engagement in South Asia (Co-author), Brookings Institution Press, Washington, D.C., USA, 2007.

=== Compiled ===
- A Select Bibliography of Periodical Literature on India and Pakistan, National Commission of Historical and Cultural Research, Islamabad, Pakistan) Vol. I is on Pakistan and was published in 1976. Vol. II deals with India and was published in 1979. Vol. III covers subjects common to both India and Pakistan and was published in 1984.

=== Co-editor ===
- Arms Race and Nuclear Developments in South Asia (Co-editor), Islamabad Policy Research Institute, 2004.
- Tribal Areas of Pakistan: Challenges and Responses (Co-editor), Islamabad Policy Research Institute, Islamabad, 2005.
- The Kashmir Imbroglio: Looking Towards the Future (Co-editor), Islamabad Policy Research Institute, Islamabad, Pakistan, 2005.
- Problems and Politics of Federalism in Pakistan (Co-editor), Islamabad Policy Research Institute, Islamabad, Pakistan, 2006.
- Political Violence and Terrorism in South Asia (Co-editor), Islamabad Policy Research Institute, Islamabad, Pakistan, 2006.
- Ballistic Missiles and South Asian Security (Co-editor), Islamabad Policy Research Institute, Islamabad, Pakistan, 2007.
- Problems and Politics of Water Sharing and Management in Pakistan (Co-editor), Islamabad Policy Research Institute, 2007.
- Quest for Energy Security in Asia (Co-Editor), Islamabad Policy Research Institute, Islamabad, 2007.
- Pakistan and Changing Scenario: Regional and Global (Co-editor) Islamabad Policy Research Institute, Islamabad, 2008.
- Political Role of Religious Communities in Pakistan (Co-editor), Islamabad Policy Research Institute, Islamabad, 2008.
- Pakistan-India Peace Process: The Way Forward (Co-editor), Islamabad, Policy Research Institute, Islamabad, 2010.
