= Trade Dispute Resolution Organization =

Trade Dispute Resolution Organization (TDRO)
Agency overview
- Formed: 2015
- Jurisdiction: Pakistan
- Parent agency: Ministry of Commerce
- Website: tdro.gov.pk

Trade Dispute Resolution Organization (TDRO) is an attached department of the Ministry of Commerce in Pakistan. It was established as a platform to prevent the harmful effects of unresolved international trade disputes and the imbalance between strong and weak players can be reduced by settling their conflicts on the basis of rules.

== History ==
The TDRO was established by the Ministry of Commerce (MoC) in 2015 to address the growing number of disputes in international trade. However, it was unable to take up the task due to a lack of legal cover. Since its inception, TDRO has resolved only 25 to 30 cases/disputes, with mutual consent of the disputing parties.

=== Act of 2022 (TDA-2022) ===
The Trade Disputes Act 2022 (TDA-2022) provided for the establishment of a comprehensive system in Pakistan. Under the new law, trade disputes will be decided within a time frame to facilitate ease of doing business for import and export businesses.

=== Resolution bill, 2023 ===
In response to the challenges, the government decided to seek parliamentary approval for a Trade Dispute Resolution Act to improve the trade dispute procedure. The Trade Dispute Resolution Bill, 2023 aims to create a robust system for the swift and efficient settlement of disagreements pertaining to the export and import of goods and services, including those related to e-commerce.
