= Iqbal Dawood Pakwala =

Pakistani politician

Provincial Minister of Sindh
- In office 2013–2013

Personal details
- Party: Pakistan Peoples Party
- Occupation: Businessman

Iqbal Dawood Pakwala is a Pakistani businessman and former caretaker minister for food in the province of Sindh in 2013.

In July 2013, Pakwala was arrested for his involvement in a multi-billion dollar scam involving the Employees Old-Age Benefits Institution (EOBI).
