= Horticulture Society of Pakistan =

Based in Karachi, Sindh, Pakistan

The Horticulture Society of Pakistan is based in Karachi, Pakistan.

== History ==
In April 1948, the Pakistan Agri-Horticulture Society was established in Karachi. The Governor-General of Pakistan was the Patron in Chief and the Governor of Pakistan Agri-Horticulture Society.

On 23 September 1949 it was renamed as Horticultural Society of Pakistan.

== Horticulture ==
Horticulture is the branch of agriculture that deals with the art, science, technology, and business of plant cultivation. It includes the cultivation of fruits, vegetables, nuts, seeds, herbs, sprouts, mushrooms, algae, flowers, seaweeds and non-food crops such as grass and ornamental trees and plants. It also includes plant conservation, landscape restoration, landscape and garden design, construction, and maintenance, and arboriculture.

== See also ==
- Pakistan Horticulture Development and Export Company (PHDEC)
