= Friends Not Masters =

1967 political autobiography by Ayub Khan

Friends Not Masters: A Political Autobiography
- Author: Ayub Khan
- Language: English
- Subject: Politics of Pakistan; Foreign relations of Pakistan
- Genre: Autobiography
- Publisher: Oxford University Press
- Publication date: 1967
- Publication place: Pakistan
- Media type: Print
- Pages: 275

Friends Not Masters: A Political Autobiography is a 1967 political autobiography credited to Pakistani president Ayub Khan, which was ghost written by Altaf Gauhar. Published by Oxford University Press while Khan was still in office, the book combines memoir with an account of Pakistan's political development, Khan's 1958 military takeover, and his views on modernization and foreign policy.

The book describes Khan's village upbringing, education at Aligarh Muslim University and the Royal Military College, Sandhurst, service in the British Indian Army, rise to become Commander-in-Chief of the Pakistan Army, and later presidency. Its title reflects Khan's argument that developing countries sought outside assistance on the basis of equality rather than domination.

== Synopsis ==
The book recounts Ayub's life from his early years in the North-West Frontier region through his military career and entry into politics. It presents his version of the political instability of Pakistan's first decade, arguing that parliamentary government, shifting coalitions, and federal tensions had produced disorder before the 1958 coup.

Much of the book is devoted to Khan's defense of his domestic and diplomatic policies. It discusses his program of controlled political participation, economic development, land reform, and his views on Pakistan's relations with India, the United States, the Soviet Union, and China.

== Reception ==
Kirkus Reviews described it as "an unusual venture for a chief of state in office" and "a valuable document for students of government: economics and geopolitics", while noting that its background would be inadequate for readers unfamiliar with the politics of Partition and early Pakistan.

In a RAND review, political scientist W. Wilcox called the autobiography "an engaging, exhortative, and passionate statement" of Khan's view of himself, his opponents, and Pakistan's future, and wrote that the sections on foreign relations and the "enemies of modernization" made "major political and intellectual contributions" to understanding Khan's outlook. The book was also reviewed in journals including International Affairs, The American Historical Review, and Political Science Quarterly.
