= Muhammad Sualeh Ahmad Faruqi =

Pakistani civil servant

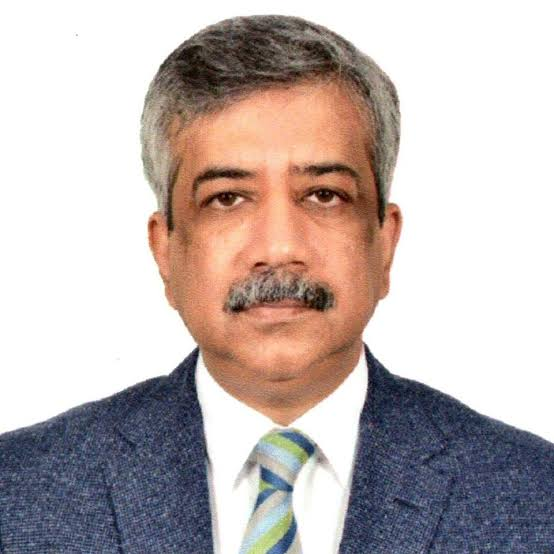

Commerce Secretary of Pakistan
- In office April 2024 – June 2024
- Appointed by: Shehbaz Sharif

Commerce Secretary of Pakistan
- In office July 2020 – March 2024
- Appointed by: Imran Khan

Personal details
- Born: Islamic Republic of Pakistan
- Parent: Ahmadullah faruqi
- Education: London School of Economics
- Occupation: Civil servant, Pakistan Administrative Service

Muhammad Sualeh Ahmad Faruqui is a retired Pakistani civil servant who served in BPS-22 grade, the highest attainable rank for a civil servant, as the Commerce Secretary of Pakistan. He currently serves as the rector of Pakistan's national school of public policy, the country's apex body for training senior civil servants. Faruqui belongs to the Pakistan Administrative Service and holds a master's degree from the London School of Economics. In 2022 after the retirement of Federal Secretary Rizwan Ahmed, Sualeh Faruqui being the next senior-most grade 22 officer from Sindh was appointed Member of the Central Selection Board- the prestigious body responsible for promotion of the country's senior civil servants.

Faruqi has previously served as Joint Secretary to Prime Minister Nawaz Sharif, Principal Secretary to Sindh Governor Muhammad Zubair Umar and as Chairman Employees Old-Age Benefits Institution (EOBI).

== Career ==
Sualeh Faruqi served as the Commerce Secretary of Pakistan, in office from July 2020 to March 2024. He has previously served as Joint Secretary to Prime Minister Nawaz Sharif, Principal Secretary to Sindh Governor Muhammad Zubair Umar, Chairman Employees Old-Age Benefits Institution (EOBI), Commissioner of Karachi, chief executive officer of Sindh Infrastructure Development Company, Director General Sindh Provincial Disaster Management Authority, and as Deputy Commissioner (South) Karachi.

== See also ==
- Naveed Kamran Baloch
- Rizwan Ahmed
- Fawad Hasan Fawad
- Jawad Rafique Malik
