= National Institute of Public Administration (Pakistan) =

Schools for civil servants in Pakistan

Agency overview
- Formed: 1961
- Jurisdiction: Government of Pakistan
- Parent agency: National School of Public Policy

National Institute of Public Administration (NIPA), are constituent units of the National School of Public Policy (NSPP) and were established to impart training for Civil Servants of Pakistan.

== History ==
It was established as National Institute of Public Administration (NIPA) in 1961 as an autonomous government organization.

In 2002, they became part of newly established National School of Public Policy.

== Campuses ==
- Quetta
- Islamabad
- Karachi
- Lahore
- Peshawar
