= Pakistan Horticulture Development and Export Company =

Government agency of Pakistan

Pakistan Horticulture Development and Export Company (PHDEC; Urdu: پاکستان باغبانی ترقی و برآمد کمپنی) is a department of Ministry of Commerce of Pakistan. PHDEC was created due to the enormous potential of Pakistan's horticulture products in the global market. In the absence of a single ministry or institution responsible for development at all levels of the horticulture value chain it was considered important to set up PHDEC to uplift this sector, especially in light of the impact of globalization and World Trade Organization (WTO) regime.

Pakistan Horticulture Development & Export Board (PHDEC), an autonomous body under the administrative control of Ministry of Commerce has been mandated with the development of horticulture industry of Pakistan with focus on exports. Its functions, inter alia, include provision of improved marketing infrastructure like establishment of agro processing zones, cold chain system, processing plants (for value added products). In 2019, Pakistan had targeted Philippines and China to further boost kinnow exports to these two countries.

The implementation arrangements are preferably under the public private partnership (PPP) modality with a clear exit strategy. PHDEC envisions the vitalization of a dynamic and market driven horticulture sector, which is resilient, sustainable and responsive to meet the challenges of globalization.

== See also ==
- Horticulture Society of Pakistan
