= National School of Public Policy =

Training center for civil servants in Pakistan

Agency overview
- Formed: 2005
- Jurisdiction: Government of Pakistan
- Headquarters: Lahore, Pakistan
- Agency executive: Muhammad Sualeh Ahmad Faruqi, Rector NSPP
- Child agency: National Institute of Public Administration
- Website: https://nspp.gov.pk/

The National School of Public Policy (NSPP) is Pakistan's leading institution for training and capacity building of senior ranking civil servants in the country. Civil servants being considered for promotion to BPS-21 complete and pass courses at NSPP, while those in grades BPS-18 to BPS-20 undergo mandatory promotion training at NSPP's constituent units, located in Karachi, Islamabad, Lahore, Quetta and Peshawar. The main NSPP campus is in Lahore.

NSPP is led by a Rector, typically a senior officer from the Pakistan Administrative Service who has served as a Federal Secretary. The Rector's position, governed by the NSPP Ordinance 2002, is a four-year term. Currently, Sualeh Ahmed Faruqui serves as Rector. The institution's Board of Governors is chaired by the President of Pakistan.
