= Nazir Ahmed =

Nazir Ahmed (also transliterated Nazir Ahmad or Nazeer Ahmed) may refer to:

== Politicians ==
- Chaudhry Nazeer Ahmad (born 1958), Pakistani businessman and politician
- Nazir Ahmad Khan (Indian politician) (born 1966), Indian Kashmiri politician
- Nazir Ahmad Khan (Pakistani politician)
- Nazeer Ahmed Baghio (born 1955), Pakistani politician
- Nazir Ahmed, Baron Ahmed (born 1957), British former politician and peer
- Nazir Ahmad Laway (born 1963), Indian politician
- Nazir Ahmed Abbasi, Pakistani politician
- Rana Nazeer Ahmed Khan (born 1949), Pakistani lawyer and politician
- Nazir Ahmed (Gilgit-Baltistan politician), Speaker of the Gilgit Baltistan Assembly
- Nazir Ahmed (politician, died 1972), former member of the National Assembly of Pakistan assassinated in 1972

== Religion ==
- Khwaja Nazir Ahmad (1897–1970), Pakistani Ahmadiyya writer
- Nazir Ahmad Qasmi (born 1965), Kashmiri Sunni scholar and Grand Mufti of the Darul Uloom Raheemiyyah seminary in Bandipore, Jammu and Kashmir, India
- Pir Nazeer Ahmed (1880–1960), Indian Sufi scholar

== Arts, entertainment, and media ==
- Nazir Ahmad Dehlvi (1836–1912), Indian Urdu writer and social and religious reformer
- Nazir Ahmed Khan (1910–1983), Pakistani film actor, director and producer
- Nazir Ahmed (filmmaker) (1925–1990), Bengali filmmaker in Pakistan

== Academia and science ==
- Nazir Ahmed (physicist) (1898–1973), Pakistani physicist, first chairman of PAEC
- Nazir Ahmed (scholar) (1915–2008), Indian scholar of Persian language and Padma Shri award winner
- Rank Nazeer Ahmed (born 1939), Indian Muslim scholar, Qur'an translator, and scientist
- Nazir Ahmad (neurosurgeon) (born 1950), neurosurgeon from Pakistan

== Other people ==
- Nazir Ahmad Khan (cricket administrator)
- Nazir Ahmad (cricketer), Afghan cricketer
- Naazir Ahmed, a fictional Indian Army commando in the 2023 Indian film Jawan, played by Kenny Basumatary
