= Ministry of Commerce (Pakistan) =

Ministry of the Government of Pakistan

- وزارت تجارت

Agency overview
- Formed: August 14, 1947; 79 years ago
- Jurisdiction: Government of Pakistan
- Headquarters: Block - A, Pak Secretariat, Red Zone, Islamabad; 33°44′13.61″N 73°05′36.29″E
- Minister responsible: Jam Kamal Khan
- Agency executive: Commerce Secretary of Pakistan
- Website: commerce.gov.pk

The Ministry of Commerce (Urdu: وزارت تجارت); abbreviated as MoCom), is a Cabinet-level ministry of the Government of Pakistan concerned with economic growth and commerce development and promotion in Pakistan. The administrative head of the ministry is the Commerce Secretary of Pakistan, presently Muhammad Sualeh Ahmad Faruqi. The political head, the Minister of Commerce, is required to be a member of Parliament.

== Departments ==
=== State Life Insurance Corporation ===
State Life Insurance Corporation of Pakistan in the state owned life insurance company. It was formed in 1972 when life insurance business in Pakistan was nationalized and 32 life insurance companies were merged and consolidated.

=== Trading Corporation of Pakistan ===
Trading Corporation of Pakistan (TCP) is the principal trading arm of the Government of Pakistan. Established as an international trading house in 1967, the corporation has gradually moved from barter, through commodity exchange to cash trade. TCP undertakes import of essential commodities to help ensure their availability to the common man at affordable prices.

=== Trade Development Authority ===
The Trade Development Authority of Pakistan (TDAP) was established in 2006. TDAP is the successor organization to the Export Promotion Bureau (EPB) and is mandated to have a holistic view of global trade development rather than only the ‘export promotion’ perspective of its predecessor. It is designated as the premier trade organization of the country.

=== National Tariff Commission ===
The National Tariff Commission (Urdu: قومی ماموریہ برائے درآمدی محصول, abbreviated at NTC) advises the Government of Pakistan on tariff measures or other form of assistance to provide protection to indigenous industry and promoting exports. Measures to counter dumping and other unfair measures adopted in respect of import and sale of foreign goods in Pakistan.

=== Pakistan Institute of Trade and Development ===
Pakistan Institute of Trade and Development, formerly Foreign Trade Institute of Pakistan (FTIP) was created in 1989 to provide specialized trainings to officers of Commerce and Trade Group.

In 2009 the institute was restructured and it now acts as policy Think Tank also and training center on International trade.

=== Pakistan Tobacco Board ===
Pakistan Tobacco Board (PTB) is a statutory semi-autonomous department of Government of Pakistan under Ministry of Commerce. Pakistan Tobacco Board oversees the promotion of the cultivation, manufacture and export of tobacco and tobacco products in Pakistan.

=== Pakistan Reinsurance Company ===
Pakistan Reinsurance Company Limited (PRCL) is a public sector company under the administrative control of the Ministry of Commerce is the sole reinsurance organization operating in Pakistan. Formerly called the Pakistan Insurance Corporation, Pakistan Reinsurance Company Limited was established in 1952.

PRCL's Role in Economic Development

The role of PRCL in economic development of Pakistan is significant. PRCL awareness of increasing requirements of insurance and reinsurance of a progressive economy is making great efforts in coming up to national expectations. This progress signifies the consolidation of the position, both at home and abroad, encouraging further expansion.

International Cooperation/ Business Relations

PRCL is actively collaborating and participating with its international counterparts in the field of insurance and reinsurance. This is being achieved under the aegis of Economic Cooperation Organization (ECO) with the object of reducing the outflow of Foreign Exchange and improving the standard of insurance and reinsurance services in the region. PRCL has been one of the pioneers and founder members of the Federation of Afro-Asian Insurers and Reinsurers (FAIR).

=== National Insurance Company Limited ===
National Insurance Company Limited (NICL) was established in 1976 to provide insurance cover to the Government/Semi Government organizations. National Insurance Company Limited is 100% owned by Government of Pakistan and working under the administrative control of federal ministry of commerce.

=== Pakistan Horticulture Development and Export Company ===
Pakistan Horticulture Development & Export Board (PHDEC), an autonomous body under the administrative control of the Ministry of Commerce has been mandated with the development of the horticulture industry of Pakistan with a focus on exports. Its functions include the provision of improved marketing infrastructure like the establishment of agro-processing zones, cold chain system, processing plants for value-added products. The implementation arrangements are preferably under the public-private partnership (PPP) modality with a clear exit strategy. PHDEC envisions the vitalization of a dynamic and market-driven horticulture sector, which is resilient, sustainable and responsive to meet the challenges of globalization.

=== Directorate General of Trade Organizations ===
Directorate General of Trade Organisations is working as an attached department of Ministry of Commerce. It was established in 2007. The core function of this Directorate is to process the applications for grant of licenses and registration of trade bodies. It also oversees the elections and results of Office Bearers and executive committee members of trade bodies and ensures that Trade Organizations Act and Rules made there-under are being followed.

=== Pakistan Institute of Fashion and Design ===
The Pakistan Institute of Fashion and Design, commonly referred to as PIFD, (formerly known as Pakistan School of Fashion Design) is a design institute specialising in design education. It offers a four-year course of study leading to a bachelor's degree.

== List of Commerce Ministers of Pakistan ==
Name of Commerce Minister	Entered Office	Left
Faisal Saleh Hayat	December 2, 1988	August 6, 1990
Assef Ahmad Ali	November 6, 1990	July 18, 1993
Ahmad Mukhtar	October 19, 1993	November 5, 1996
Ishaq Dar	February 17, 1997	October 12, 1999
Humayun Akhtar Khan	November 23, 2002	November 15, 2007
Shahid Khaqan Abbasi	March 31, 2008	May 12, 2008
Makhdoom Ameen Faheem	November 3, 2008	March 16, 2013
Khurram Dastgir Khan	January 7, 2014	July 28, 2017
Muhammad Pervaiz Malik	August 4, 2017	31 May 2018
Mian Misbah-ur-Rehman (caretaker)	June 27. 2018	18 August, 2018
Abdul Razak Dawood as Advisor with status of federal minister	20 August 2018	10 April 2022
Naveed Qamar	19 April 2022	10 August 2023
Gohar Ejaz (caretaker)	17 August 2023	4 February 2024
Jam Kamal Khan	11 March 2024	Incumbent

== See also ==
- Economy of Pakistan
- Ministry of Finance (Pakistan)
- Pakistan Board of Investment
- Trading Corporation of Pakistan
- Pakistan Horticulture Development and Export Board
