= Sarai Saleh =

Pakistani administrative area

Sarai Saleh سرائے صالح
- Town and union council
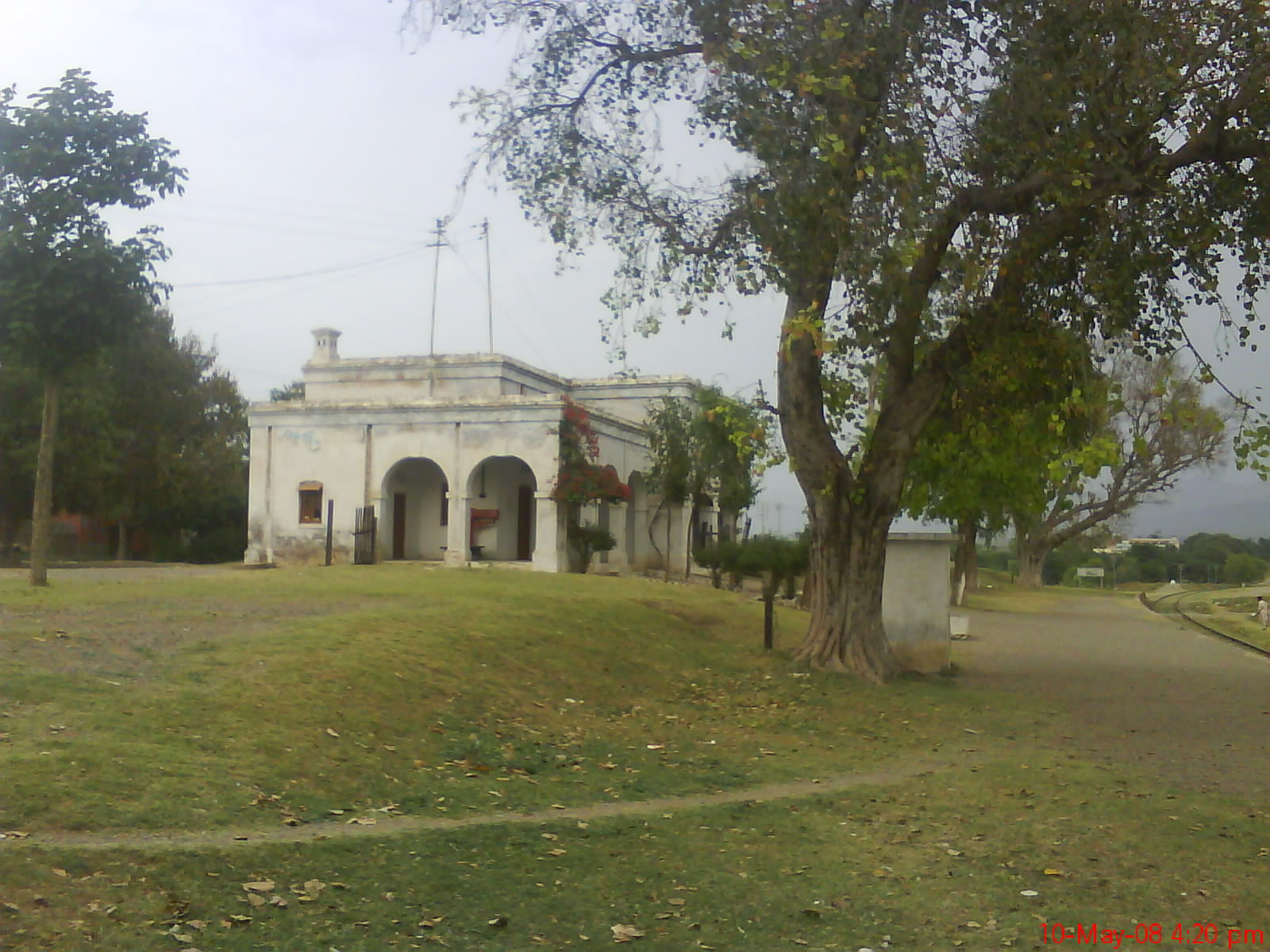
- Historic railway station in Serai Saleh
- Interactive map of Sarai Saleh
- Country: Pakistan
- Region: Khyber Pakhtunkhwa
- District: Haripur District
- Time zone: UTC+5 (PST)

Sarai Saleh (Urdu: سرائے صالح) is one of the 45 union councils of Haripur District, Khyber Pakhtunkhwa, Pakistan.

Located five kilometres northeast of Haripur City at an elevation of 597 meters, it is a scenic valley surrounded by hills, covering an area of two to three square kilometres. Situated on the main Hazara Road near the Dor River, Sarai Saleh is home to several archaeological sites, including Buddhist-era mounds, Hindu temples, and an historic train station.
