= Insurance in Pakistan =

Insurance in Pakistan is regulated under the Insurance Ordinance, 2000. It is divided into three components: life insurance, general insurance and health insurance. The Government of Pakistan established the Department of Insurance in April 1948 as a department of the Ministry of Commerce; the aim of this department is to take care of affairs related to the insurance industry.

== History ==
Pakistan was established as an Islamic country in 1947 out of British India with an underdeveloped insurance sector compared to India. Many Muslims relocating from India were uninsured, and the staff of Indian insurance companies quickly left Pakistan. Initially, Pakistan had only five domestic insurance firms. The establishment of life insurance companies in what is now Pakistan was predominantly influenced by Christian communities; Christian Mutual was established in Lahore in 1847, and Indian Life, founded by the Catholic community in Karachi in 1892, was renamed Ideal Life in 1956.

By 1950, two more companies, EFU Insurance and Habib Insurance, which were founded in 1932 and 1942 respectively in British India and catered primarily to Muslims, moved to Pakistan on Muhammad Ali Jinnah's request.

In the early 1950s, the Pakistani government initiated efforts to grow the domestic insurance industry and decrease the dominance of foreign companies, which in 1950 represented about 80 percent of non-life premiums and over 52 percent of life insurance premiums. By 1968, foreign participation had decreased to 25 percent in non-life insurance and less than 13 percent in life insurance. The reduction was facilitated by increasing the capital requirements for foreign firms and establishing the partly state-owned Pakistan Insurance Corporation (PIC) in 1953. All insurance companies in Pakistan were initially required to cede 10 percent of their business to the PIC, a figure that increased to a minimum of 30 percent after 1957. The PIC also supported the establishment of local companies and introduced a national co-insurance system in 1955 to aid smaller local firms.

After the secession of East Pakistan in 1971, which then became Bangladesh, both the new state and Pakistan nationalized their insurance industries. In Pakistan, this involved the creation of the State Life Insurance Corporation of Pakistan (SLIC) to manage the life insurance sector. Furthermore, all state-controlled enterprises, such as Pakistan International Airlines (PIA), were required to insure with the national co-insurance pool. By the 1970s, the market share of the remaining twenty-three foreign property insurers had been reduced to 20 percent.

== Regulation ==
Insurance in Pakistan is regulated under the Insurance Ordinance, 2000.

The Pakistani insurance market has undergone major structural changes in last few years through mergers of companies to meet the increased statutory requirement of minimum paid up capital as per Insurance Ordinance 2000. Some companies who were unable to raise this capital have been asked to close down their operations. The Security and Exchange Commission of Pakistan (SECP), Insurance Division, is trying to improve the image of Pakistan Insurance Industry by issuing directives on financial security and transparency, code of good governance and sound market practice.

== List of companies ==
List of notable insurance companies in Pakistan:

- Adamjee Insurance
- State Life Insurance Corporation of Pakistan
- Jubilee Life
- EFU Life
- Security General Insurance
- TPL Insurance
