= Employees' Old-Age Benefits Institution =

Pakistani government pension organization

Employees' Old-Age Benefits Institution (EOBI)
- ادارہِ مراعاتِ معمّر ملازمین

Agency overview
- Formed: April 15, 1976; 50 years ago
- Jurisdiction: Pakistan
- Headquarters: Karachi
- Agency executive: Javed Shaikh, Chairperson
- Website: Employees' Old-Age Benefits Institution

The Employees' Old-Age Benefits Institution (EOBI; Urdu: ادارہِ مراعاتِ معمّر ملازمین) is the pension, old age benefits and social insurance institution of the Government of Pakistan. It operates under the control of Ministry of Overseas Pakistanis and Human Resource Development. It came into formation in 1976, through the passage of the Employees' Old-Age Benefits Institution Act of 1976 by the Parliament of Pakistan. Javed Shaikh is the acting chairperson of Employee's Old-Age Benefits Institution.

== Contribution to EOBI ==
EOBI operates on the partially funded basis. The insured person as well as the employer of the insured person are supposed to make contribution to EOBI during the period of insurable employment. Employers are supposed to pay 5% of the minimum wages prescribed by the government while employees are supposed to pay 1% of the minimum wages. This contribution constitutes half of the total contribution while remaining half comes from the Government of Pakistan. Government of Pakistan contributed to this scheme till 1995 but withdrew thereafter. The current EOBI Contribution is Rs. 2400 per month for every employee, out of which Rs. 2000 is contributed by the employer while Rs. 400 is contributed by the employee.

In addition to the contribution from employers, employees and government, EOBI invests in profitable projects to generate income for providing pension.

== Benefits provided by EOBI ==
Employees' Old-Age Benefits Institution provides following benefits to the insured person or its survivors. An insured person typically becomes eligible to get pension after reaching the age of 60 and completing 15 years of insured service.

1. Old age pension - This pension is provided in an event of retirement
2. Survivors' pension - Survivors pension is provided to the nominees of the insured person in event of death of the insured person. As per Islamic teachings old parents and young widows are included in the survivor pension program. As per EOBI rules, parents of the unmarried employee gets pension for 5 years in case of employee's death. If any employee dies after 36 months of EOBI insurable service, his widow gets the survivors pension for the entire life. Children of the deceased insured individual are eligible to get the EOBI survivor pension even if the widow of the insured employee gets remarried given the stepfather of the children may not take the financial responsibility of the children
3. Invalidity pension - This pension is provided in case of disability of the insured person
4. Old age grant - Old age grants are given to those who have attained the superannuation age but do not meet the minimum threshold for pension

Minimum pension of ₨ 8500/- (revised 2019) is provided by scheme while maximum pension is limited by the average wages during employment and years of contribution to insurance scheme.

As per 2001-02 numbers there are over 2 lakh beneficiaries of these scheme. The details of the beneficiaries are given in the table below.

Category	Disbursed Pension in Million Rs	Percentage share in total pension	No. of beneficiaries
Old age pension	747	78.8	141330
Survivors pension	187	19.6	52782
Invalidity pension	8	0.9	4825
Old age grant	6	0.7	3776
Total	948	100	202,707

== Growth of EOBI ==
Number of employers and employees registered with EOBI grew since its inception in 1977. The details of participating employers, insured employees and beneficiaries are given in the table below.

Registration	Participating Employers	Insured Employees	Beneficiaries
1977	5447	8807	--
1999	42632	1,465,087	164,203
2000	43560	1,572,014	181,547
Growth(%) 99-'00	2.2	7.3	10.6

== Limitations and criticism ==
Average income distributed by the pension scheme is very low which grew from ₨ 888/- to ₨ 1000/- per month in year 2006-07. There is no provision for indexation with increase in cost of living. Also, provincial employees lose the health insurance benefit the moment they retire from the work which is the time they need the health insurance benefit the most.

== Major challenges ==
One of the major challenge faced by EOBI is low contribution to EOBI resulting in lower contribution compared with the liabilities for the beneficiaries. It is estimated that the current contributions and return from investment will not be sufficient to cover the benefit payment and administrative expenses by 2024. It is estimated that the fund will be completely exhausted by 2035.

== Mitigating actions taken ==
Computerization and administrative reforms are being carried out to reduce the administrative expenses. As a result, the administrative expenditure which was around 22% of the contribution in 2002-03 came down to 17% in 2003-04. Further work is required to reduce the administrative expenses to ensure profitability of the scheme.
