= Waqar Masood Khan =

Pakistani civil servant (21 January 1957 – 2025)

- وقار مسعود خان

Adviser to the Prime Minister on Finance
- Caretaker
- In office 17 August 2023 – 4 March 2024
- President: Arif Alvi
- Prime Minister: Anwar ul Haq Kakar
- Minister: Ali Pervaiz Malik
- Preceded by: Shaukat Tarin

Special Assistant to the Prime Minister for Finance and Revenue (Minister of State)
- In office 5 October 2020 – 20 August 2021
- President: Arif Alvi
- Prime Minister: Imran Khan
- Minister: Shaukat Tarin

Finance Secretary of Pakistan
- In office April 2013 – 20 January 2017
- Preceded by: Abdul Wajid Rana
- Succeeded by: Tariq Bajwa
- In office 21 December 2010 – 11 February 2012
- Preceded by: Salman Siddiq
- Succeeded by: Abdul Wajid Rana
- In office 2 September 2008 – 3 February 2009
- Preceded by: Farrukh Qayyum
- Succeeded by: Salman Siddiq
- In office 9 January 2008 – 2 May 2008
- Preceded by: Ahmad Waqar
- Succeeded by: Farrukh Qayyum

Personal details
- Born: 21 January 1957 Karachi, Pakistan
- Died: 20 September 2025 (aged 74) Islamabad, Pakistan
- Relatives: cricketer Shan Masood (nephew)
- Education: Boston University
- Occupation: Banker, former civil servant

Waqar Masood Khan (Urdu: وقار مسعود خان 21 January 1957 – 20 September 2025) was a Pakistani civil servant who served as an Adviser to Prime Minister Anwar ul Haq Kakar on Finance, in office from August 2023 until 4 March 2024.

== Personal life ==
Pakistani cricketer Shan Masood is his nephew.

== Career ==
He previously served as a Special Assistant to Prime Minister Imran Khan on Revenue and Finance in the capacity of a Minister of State in Cabinet, in office from October 2020 till August 2021.

Before his retirement from civil services, Waqar served in BPS-22 grade as Pakistan's longest running Secretary of Finance.

Waqar Masood Khan held several positions across the Federal Government including Special Secretary to the Prime Minister, Secretary Finance Division, Secretary Economic Affairs Division, Secretary Petroleum & Natural Resources and Secretary Textile Industry. He taught macroeconomics at the graduate level at Pakistan Institute of Development Economics (PIDE).

He also served as a board member on the Board of Directors of State Bank of Pakistan, Islamic Development Bank, National Bank of Pakistan, Pakistan International Airlines, Pakistan Telecommunication Company Limited (PTCL) and Pak-Oman Investment Company. Later, Khan was appointed Chairman of the Board of SadaPay, a fintech company in the private sector that is operating under the Electronic Money Institution regulatory framework by the State Bank of Pakistan.

== Death ==
Waqar Masood Khan died after a brief illness in Islamabad, on 20 September 2025, at the age of 68.

== Writings ==
Article

- "Towards an Interest-Free Islamic Economic System", Journal of King Abdulaziz University: Islamic Economics, Vol. 1, 1989, pp. 3–38.

Book

- Transition to a Riba Free Economy, International Institute of Islamic Thought and Islamic Research Institute, 2002, 144 p.
