= Victor Turner (civil servant) =

English-Pakistani civil service officer, statistician and economist (1892–1974)

Sir Victor Turner, CSI, CIE, MBE, SI
- Sir Victor Alfred Charles Turner in 1912

1st Finance Secretary of Pakistan
- In office 15 August 1947 – 1 February 1950
- Governors-General: Muhammad Ali Jinnah; Sir Khawaja Nazimuddin
- Prime Minister: Liaquat Ali Khan
- Governor: Zahid Hussain
- Preceded by: Office established
- Succeeded by: Abdul Qadir

Chairman of the Central Board of Revenue
- In office 14 August 1947 – 1 February 1950
- Governors-General: Muhammad Ali Jinnah; Sir Khawaja Nazimuddin
- Prime Minister: Liaquat Ali Khan
- Governor: Zahid Hussain
- Preceded by: Office established
- Succeeded by: Abdul Qadir

Personal details
- Born: Alfred Charles Turner; 12 March 1892 Kensington, London, England
- Died: 16 October 1974 (aged 82) Surrey, England
- Citizenship: British citizenship and Pakistani citizenship - dual citizenship
- Education: Emmanuel College, Cambridge
- Occupation: civil servant
- Profession: economist
- Cabinet: Liaquat Ali Khan government

Sir Victor Alfred Charles Turner, CSI, CIE, MBE, SI (12 March 1892 – 16 October 1974) was an English-Pakistani civil service officer, statistician and economist, and one of the founding fathers of the Civil Service of Pakistan, serving as the first Finance Secretary of Pakistan in the government of Prime Minister Liaquat Ali Khan, as well as Chairman of the Central Board of Revenue from 15 August 1947 until 1 February 1950.

== Early life and education ==
Alfred Charles Turner was born at 36, Campden Street, Kensington, London England on 12 March 1892 to Walter Charles Turner, a butler, and his wife Annie formerly Searle. His older brothers were Walter Edward Neal Turner, born 1886, and Robert Henry Turner, born 1889. Alfred's early education was at St Mary Abbots Higher Grade School, Kensington 1896–1904 and then he attended Latymer Upper School, Hammersmith 1905–1911. In the autumn of 1911, he went up to Emmanuel College, Cambridge on an Open Scholarship to read Mathematics. He gained a 'First' in Part 1 of the Maths Tripos in 1912, and in Part 2 was Wrangler in 1914. He was awarded his BA in 1914 and his MA in 1918.

== Military career ==
During the First World War, Alfred Charles served with the Royal Fusiliers as a Lieutenant, and fought in France from 9 August 1915. He then became Inspector of Propellent Explosives at the Woolwich Arsenal with the rank of Captain. In 1921, he applied for and was awarded the 1914/15 Star, British War and Victory Medals. His address at the time of his medal application was Sitapur, Gorakhpur, United Provinces, India.

== Indian Civil Service ==
Turner joined the Indian Civil Service in 1919 (he was posted to Lucknow as an assistant commissioner) and went out to what is now Uttar Pradesh in 1920. Between 1926 and 1929 he was involved with the resettlement of the Rae Bareli district and in 1930 was given responsibility for the organisation of the 1931 census of Uttar Pradesh. His undoubted skill as an administrator led to his appointment as Revenue Secretary to the Provincial Government in 1935 and was made Financial Secretary in 1936. In 1941, he rose to become Additional Secretary in the Indian Government in Delhi, was Financial Commissioner for Railways in late 1945 and returned to the Finance Department as Principal Secretary in early 1947. He was knighted in 1947 as a Knight Bachelor, and added 'Victor' to his name.

== Pakistan ==
After the establishment of the Dominion of Pakistan, Sir Victor Turner was the first finance secretary as well as the first Christian to be appointed to one of the key administrative posts, by the Prime Minister, Liaquat Ali Khan. He took an active role in the Pakistan Movement and was one of the main Christian leaders in the movement.

Soon after being appointed, Turner became the first person to head the Federal Bureau of Statistics, and was asked by the Prime Minister to re-organize the government departments and financial institutions. Turner succeeded in establishing the installation of a paper currency mill, with the help of De La Rue plc., printing the first official rupee which carries his own signature, V.A.C. Turner. Sir Victor made several reforms in the Pakistan Civil Service, submitting a report to the Prime Minister with recommendations about the size of the Civil Service and high-lighting existing deficiencies in various ministries. After the assassination of Prime Minister Liaquat Ali Khan, Turner was removed from the government, and he moved back to the United Kingdom to take up an appointment as the financial adviser to the High Commissioner of Pakistan in London. He also served as the first Treasurer of the newly founded, UK-based Pakistan Society until 1969.

== Later life ==
After leaving Pakistan, Sir Victor continued to visit it, advising the government on various economic issues. Because of his extensive contributions, the government of Pakistan conferred on him the Sitara-e-Imtiaz. In 1954 he was appointed as an economic adviser to Thomas De La Rue and Co.Ltd., and he retired in 1964. Sir Victor Turner died on 16 October 1974 in Surrey, England, aged 82 and was survived by his widow Winifred Bessie formerly Howarth whom he married in 1957. He also left a daughter by his first marriage, Joan Goodall (taking her step-father's surname, married name Bond), in 1916 to Gladys Olive Alice Sindall and a son and a daughter by his second marriage to Gladys Blanche Hoskins in 1927.

== Honours ==
- Knighthood as a Knight Bachelor – 1947.
- Companion of the Order of the Indian Empire (CIE).
- Companion of the Order of the Star of India (CSI).
- Member of the Most Excellent Order of the British Empire (MBE).
- Sitara-e-Imtiaz.

== See also ==
- Pakistan Movement
- Planning Commission
- Pakistan–United Kingdom relations
- British Raj
