= Tariq Bajwa =

Pakistani civil servant

- طارق باجوہ

19th Governor of the State Bank of Pakistan
- In office 7 July 2017 – 3 May 2019
- Appointed by: Nawaz Sharif
- Preceded by: Ashraf Mahmood Wathra
- Succeeded by: Reza Baqir

Finance Secretary of Pakistan
- In office February 2017 – July 2017
- Appointed by: Nawaz Sharif

Economic Affairs Secretary of Pakistan
- In office November 2015 – July 2017
- Appointed by: Nawaz Sharif

Chairman Federal Board of Revenue
- In office July 2013 – October 2015
- Appointed by: Nawaz Sharif

Personal details
- Party: PMLN (2017-predent)
- Education: Harvard University
- Occupation: Banker, former Central Superior Services, Politician

Tariq Bajwa is a retired Pakistani civil servant who served as the Finance Secretary and Economic Affairs Secretary of Pakistan. Bajwa also served as the 19th Governor of the State Bank of Pakistan and the 20th Chairman of the Federal Board of Revenue.

== Education ==
He is the only Pakistani who won the Littauer fellowship at Harvard University. He also received a master's degree in Public Administration from the same institution.

== Career ==
Bajwa served as the governor of the State Bank from 7 July 2017 up till he was asked to resign from the post on 3 May 2019. Prior to this, he served as a civil servant belonging to the Pakistan Administrative Service. He served as the Economic Affairs Secretary of Pakistan from November 2015 to February 2017, and as Finance Secretary of Pakistan from February 2017 to July 2017. He also remained the chairman of Federal Board of Revenue from July 2013 to October 2015.

He also previously served as Finance Secretary to the Government of the Punjab and as Head of Pakistan’s Trade Mission in Los Angeles.

== See also ==
- Nasir Khosa
- Fawad Hasan Fawad
- Rizwan Ahmed
- Nargis Sethi
- Shamshad Akhtar
