= Dominion of Pakistan =

British dominion in South Asia from 1947 to 1956

Pakistan پاکستان (Urdu) পাকিস্তান (Bengali)
- 1947–1956
- Flag Emblem
- Motto: "Faith, Unity, Discipline" (Note: adopted in 1948) ایمان، اتحاد، نظم (Urdu); Īmān, Ittiḥād, Naẓm ঈমান, একতা, শৃঙ্খলা (Bengali); Īmān, Ēkatā, Śr̥ṅkhalā
- Anthem: قومی ترانہ (Urdu) (Note: adopted in 1954); Qaumī Tarānah "The National Anthem"
- Land controlled by the Dominion of Pakistan shown in dark green; land claimed but not controlled shown in light green
- Capital: Karachi
- Largest city: Dacca
- Official languages: English (Note: Official Language: 14 August 1947)
- Recognised national languages: Urdu (Note: First National Language: 23 February 1948); Bengali (Note: Second National Language: 29 February 1956)
- Demonym: Pakistani
- Government: Federal constitutional monarchy
- Monarch
  - 1947–1952: George VI
  - 1952–1956: Elizabeth II
- Governor-General
  - 1947–1948: Muhammad Ali Jinnah
  - 1948–1951: Khawaja Nazimuddin
  - 1951–1955: Malik Ghulam Muhammad
  - 1955–1956: Iskander Mirza
- Prime Minister
  - 1947–1951: Liaquat Ali Khan
  - 1951–1953: Khawaja Nazimuddin
  - 1953–1955: Mohammad Ali Bogra
  - 1955–1956: Chaudhry Mohammad Ali
- Legislature: Constituent Assembly
- History
  - Independence: 14 August 1947
  - Republic: 23 March 1956

Area
  - Total: 1,030,373 km^{2} (397,829 sq mi)
- Currency: Indian rupee (1947–1948); Pakistani rupee (1948–1956)
Preceded by	Succeeded by
British Raj; See list of princely states	Islamic Republic of Pakistan
- Today part of: Pakistan; Bangladesh; India (Note: See territorial exchanges between India and Bangladesh (India–Bangladesh enclaves).)

The Dominion of Pakistan, officially Pakistan, was the Pakistani state between 1947 and 1956, when it existed as an independent federal dominion in the British Commonwealth of Nations. It was established on 14 August 1947 when it became independent from British India under the Indian Independence Act 1947 of the British parliament, which also established an independent Dominion of India on 15 August. The dominion ceased to exist on 23 March 1956, when the Constituent Assembly of Pakistan adopted a constitution which established Pakistan as a republic.

The new dominion consisted of those presidencies and provinces of British India which were allocated to it in the Partition of India. Until 1947, these regions had been ruled by the United Kingdom as a part of the British Empire.

Its status as a federal dominion ended in 1956 with the completion of the constitution of Pakistan, which established the country as a republic. The constitution also administratively split the nation into West Pakistan and East Pakistan. Until then, these provinces had been governed as a singular entity, despite being separate geographic exclaves. Eventually, the East became Bangladesh and the West became Pakistan.

During the year that followed its independence, the new country was joined by the princely states of Pakistan, which were ruled by princes who had previously been in subsidiary alliances with the British. These states acceded to Pakistan one by one as their rulers signed Instruments of Accession. For many years, these states enjoyed a special status within the dominion and later the republic, but they were slowly incorporated into the provinces.

== History ==
=== Partition and independence ===
Section 1 of the Indian Independence Act 1947 provided that from "the fifteenth day of August, nineteen hundred and forty-seven, two independent dominions shall be set up in India, to be known respectively as India and Pakistan." Muslims had been pushing for their own state since at least 1940 (see the Lahore resolution), believing they would become second-class citizens in a Hindu-majority India otherwise. The British monarch became the head of state of both the new dominions, with Pakistan sharing a king with the United Kingdom and the other dominions of the British Commonwealth, and the monarch's constitutional roles in Pakistan were delegated to the Governor-General of Pakistan.

Before August 1947, about half of the area of present-day Pakistan was part of British India, which was directly governed by the British in the name of the British Crown, while the remainder were princely states in subsidiary alliances with the British, enjoying semi-autonomous self-government. The British abandoned these alliances in August 1947, leaving the states entirely independent, and between 1947 and 1948 the states all acceded to Pakistan, while retaining internal self-government for several years.

More than ten million people migrated across the new borders and between 200,000 and 2,000,000 people died in the spate of communal violence in the Punjab in what some scholars have described as a 'retributive genocide' between the religions. The Pakistani government claimed that 50,000 Muslim women were abducted and raped by Hindu and Sikh men and similarly the Indian government claimed that Muslims abducted and raped 33,000 Hindu and Sikh women. The two governments agreed to repatriate abducted women and thousands of Hindu, Sikh and Muslim women were repatriated to their families in the 1950s. The dispute over Kashmir escalated into the first war between India and Pakistan. With the assistance of the United Nations (UN) the war was ended but it became the Kashmir dispute.

A 1950 documentary about Pakistan

In 1947, the founding fathers of Pakistan agreed to appoint Liaquat Ali Khan as the country's first prime minister, with Muhammad Ali Jinnah as both first governor-general and speaker of the State Parliament. Mountbatten had offered to serve as Governor-general of both India and Pakistan but Jinnah refused this offer.

The first formal step to transform Pakistan into an ideological Islamic state was taken in March 1949 when Liaquat Ali Khan introduced the Objectives Resolution in the Constituent Assembly. The Objectives Resolution declared that sovereignty over the entire universe belongs to Allah. Support for the Objectives Resolution and the transformation of Pakistan into an Islamic state was led by Maulana Shabbir Ahmad Usmani, a respected Deobandi alim (scholar) who occupied the position of Shaykh al-Islam in Pakistan in 1949, and Maulana Mawdudi of Jamaat-i Islami.

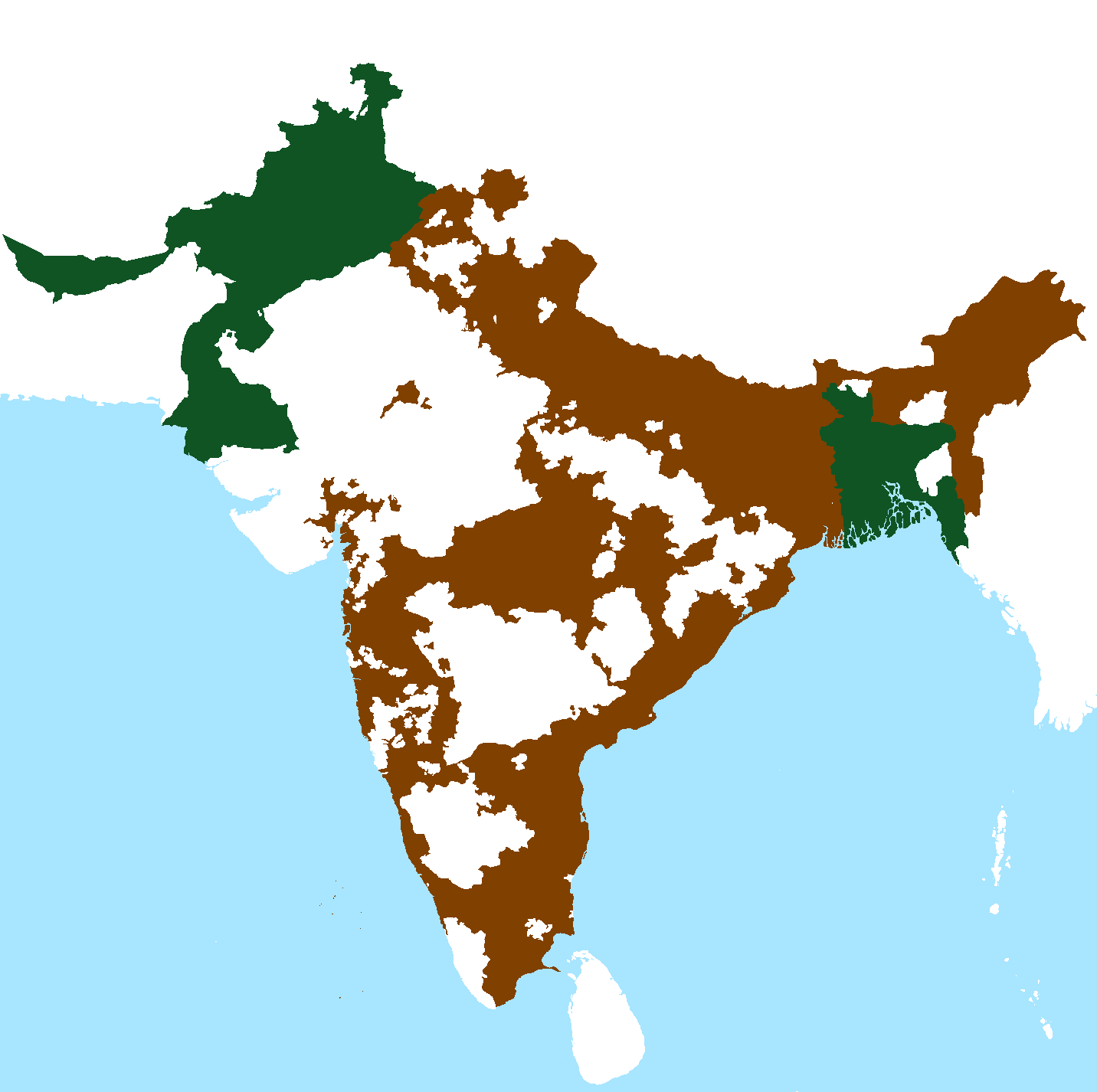
Territorial extent of Pakistan and India upon independence

Indian Muslims from the United Provinces, Bombay Province, Central Provinces and other areas of India continued migrating to Pakistan throughout the 1950 and 1960s and settled mainly in urban Sindh, particularly in the new country's first capital, Karachi. Prime Minister Ali Khan established a strong government and had to face challenges soon after gaining the office. His Finance Secretary Victor Turner announced the country's first monetary policy by establishing the State Bank, the Federal Bureau of Statistics and the Federal Board of Revenue to improve statistical knowledge, finance, taxation, and revenue collection in the country. There were also problems because India cut off water supply to Pakistan from two canal headworks in its side of Punjab on 1 April 1948 and also withheld delivering Pakistan its share of the assets and funds of United India, which the Indian government released after Gandhi's pressurisation.

=== Political unrest ===
In a 1948 speech, Jinnah declared that "Urdu alone would be the state language and the lingua franca of the Pakistan state", although at the same time he called for the Bengali language to be the official language of the Bengal province. Nonetheless, tensions began to grow in East Bengal. Jinnah's health further deteriorated and he died in 1948. Bengali leader, Sir Khawaja Nazimuddin succeeded as the governor general of Pakistan.

During a massive political rally in 1951, Prime Minister Ali Khan was assassinated, and Nazimuddin became the second prime minister. Tensions in East Pakistan reached a climax in 1952, when the East Pakistani police opened fire on students protesting for the Bengali language to receive equal status with Urdu. The situation was controlled by Nazimuddin who issued a waiver granting the Bengali language equal status, a right codified in the 1956 constitution. In 1953 at the instigation of religious parties, anti-Ahmadiyya riots erupted, which led to many Ahmadi deaths. The riots were investigated by a two-member court of inquiry in 1954, which was criticised by the Jamaat-e-Islami, one of the parties accused of inciting the riots. This event led to the first instance of martial law in the country and began the history of military intervention into the politics and civilian affairs of the country. In 1954 the controversial One Unit Program was imposed by the last Pakistan Muslim League (PML) Prime minister Ali Bogra dividing Pakistan on the German geopolitical model. The same year the first legislative elections were held in Pakistan, which saw the communists gaining control of East Pakistan. The 1954 election results clarified the differences in ideology between West and East Pakistan, with East Pakistan under the influence of the Communist Party allying with the Shramik Krishak Samajbadi Dal (Workers Party) and the Awami League. The pro-American Republican Party gained a majority in West Pakistan, ousting the PML government. After a vote of confidence in Parliament and the promulgation of the 1956 constitution, which confirmed Pakistan as an Islamic republic, two notable figures became prime minister and president, as the first Bengali leaders of the country. Huseyn Suhrawardy became the prime minister leading a communist-socialist alliance, and Iskander Mirza became the first president of Pakistan.

=== Radcliffe Line and territory ===
Mountbatten's proposed flag for Pakistan, consisting of the flag of the Muslim League defaced with a Union Jack in the canton

The dominion began as a federation of five provinces: East Bengal (later to become Bangladesh), West Punjab, Balochistan, Sindh, and the North-West Frontier Province (NWFP). Each province had its own governor, who was appointed by the Governor-General of Pakistan. In addition, over the following year the princely states of Pakistan, which covered a significant area of West Pakistan, acceded to Pakistan. They included Bahawalpur, Khairpur, Swat, Dir, Chitral, and the Khanate of Kalat.

The controversial Radcliffe Award, not published until 17 August 1947 specified the Radcliffe Line which demarcated the border between the parts of British India allocated to the two new independent dominions of India and Pakistan. The Radcliffe Boundary Commission sought to separate the Muslim-majority regions in the east and northwest from the areas with a Hindu majority. This entailed the partition of two British provinces which did not have a uniform majority — Bengal and Punjab. The western part of Punjab became the Pakistani province of Punjab and the eastern part became the Indian state of Punjab. Bengal was similarly divided into East Bengal (in Pakistan) and West Bengal (in India).

=== Monarchy and the Commonwealth ===
Under the Indian Independence Act 1947, British India was to be divided into the independent sovereign states of India and Pakistan. From 1947 to 1952, George VI was the sovereign of Pakistan, which shared the same person as its sovereign with the United Kingdom and the other Dominions in the British Commonwealth of Nations.

Following George VI's death on 6 February 1952, his elder daughter Princess Elizabeth, who was in Kenya at that time, became the new monarch of Pakistan. During the Queen's coronation in 1953, Elizabeth II was crowned as Queen of seven independent Commonwealth countries, including Pakistan. In her Coronation Oath, the new Queen promised "to govern the Peoples of ... Pakistan ... according to their respective laws and customs". The Standard of Pakistan at the Coronation was borne by Mirza Abol Hassan Ispahani.

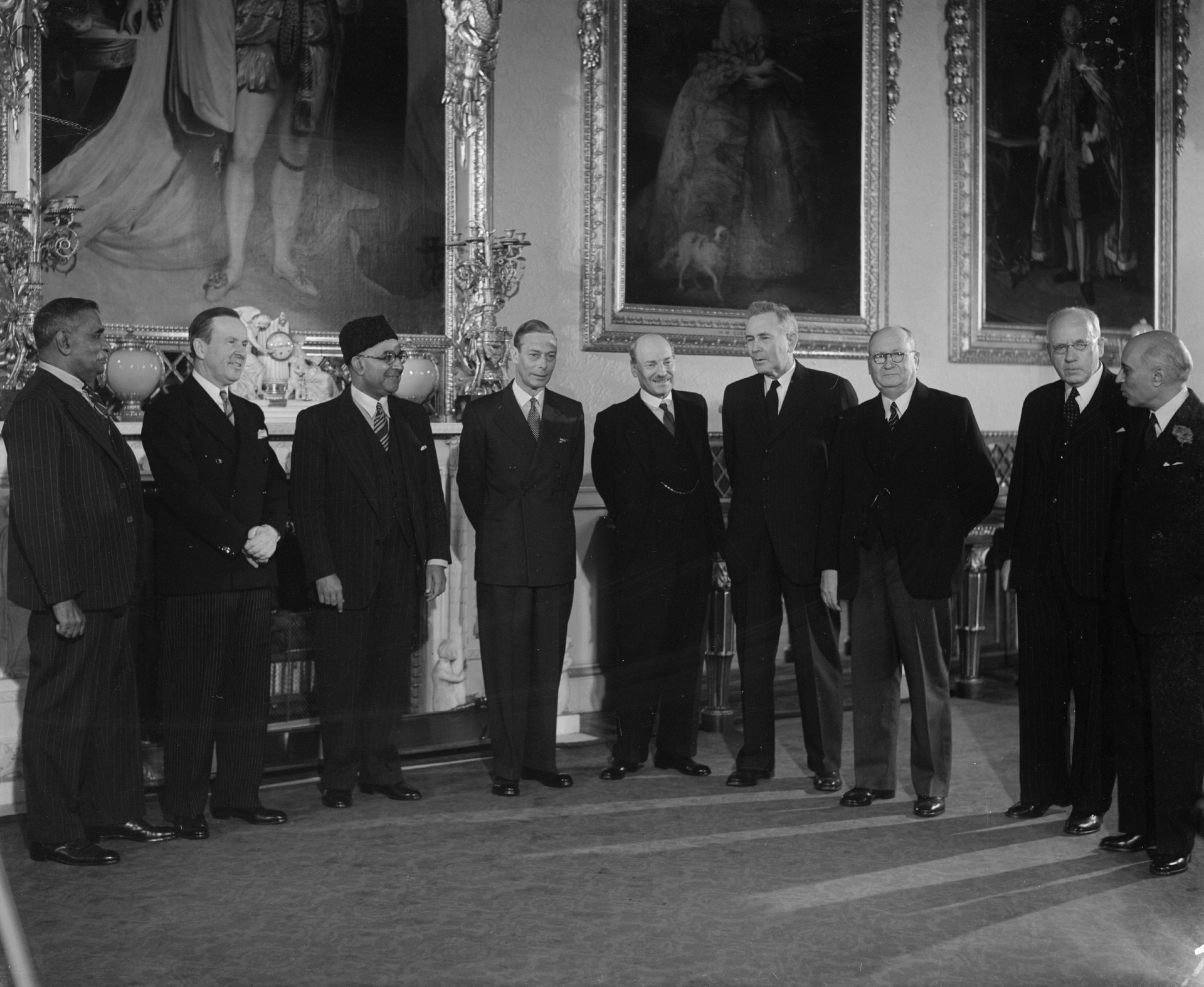
Commonwealth premiers along with King George VI, then the King of Pakistan, at Buckingham Palace for the Commonwealth Prime Minister's Conference in April 1949. Liaquat Ali Khan is third from the left.

Pakistan abolished the monarchy on the adoption of a republican constitution on 23 March 1956. However, Pakistan became a republic within the Commonwealth of Nations. The Queen sent a message to President Mirza which said, "I have followed with close interest the progress of your country since its establishment ... It is a source of great satisfaction to me to know that your country intends to remain within the Commonwealth. I am confident that Pakistan and other countries of the Commonwealth will continue to thrive and to benefit from their mutual association".

=== Foreign relations ===
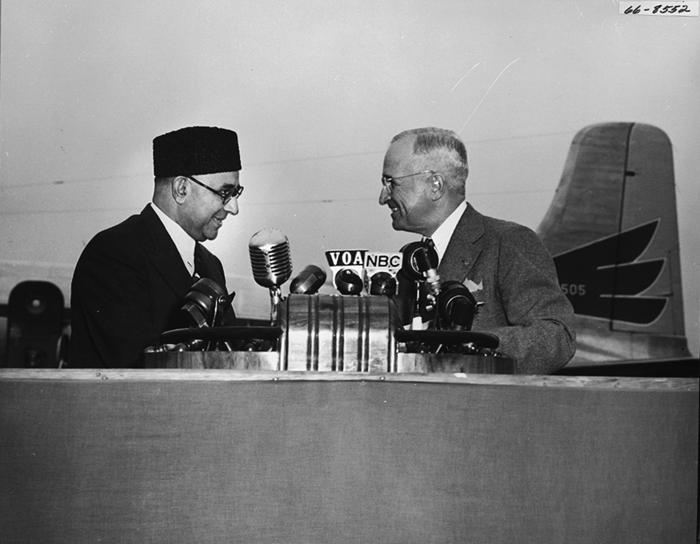
Prime Minister Liaquat Ali Khan meeting President Harry Truman

Territorial problems arose with neighbouring Afghanistan over the Pakistan–Afghanistan border in 1949, and with India over the Line of Control in Kashmir. Diplomatic recognition became a problem when the Soviet Union led by Joseph Stalin did not welcome the partition which established Pakistan and India. The Imperial State of Iran was the first country to recognise Pakistan in 1947. In 1948, Ben-Gurion of Israel sent a secret courier to Jinnah to establish the diplomatic relations, but Jinnah did not give any response to Ben-Gurion.

After gaining Independence, Pakistan vigorously pursued bilateral relations with other Muslim countries and made a wholehearted bid for leadership of the Muslim world, or at least for leadership in achieving its unity. The Ali brothers had sought to project Pakistan as the natural leader of the Islamic world, in large part due to its large population and military strength. A top ranking Muslim League leader, Khaliquzzaman, declared that Pakistan would bring together all Muslim countries into Islamistan – a pan-Islamic entity. The USA, which did not approve of Pakistan's creation, was against this idea and British Prime Minister Clement Attlee voiced international opinion at the time by stating that he wished that India and Pakistan would re-unite, as opposed to the hoped-for unity of Muslim World. Since most of the Arab world was undergoing a nationalist awakening at the time, there was little attraction in Pakistan's pan-Islamic aspirations. Some of the Arab countries saw the 'Islamistan' project as a Pakistani attempt to dominate other Muslim states. Pakistan vigorously championed the right of self-determination for Muslims around the world. Pakistan's efforts for the independence movements of Indonesia, Algeria, Tunisia, Morocco and Eritrea were significant and initially led to close ties between these countries and Pakistan. On 21 December 1954, Pakistan officially recognized Laos and Cambodia, while simultaneously granting de facto recognition to North Vietnam and South Vietnam.

== Economy ==
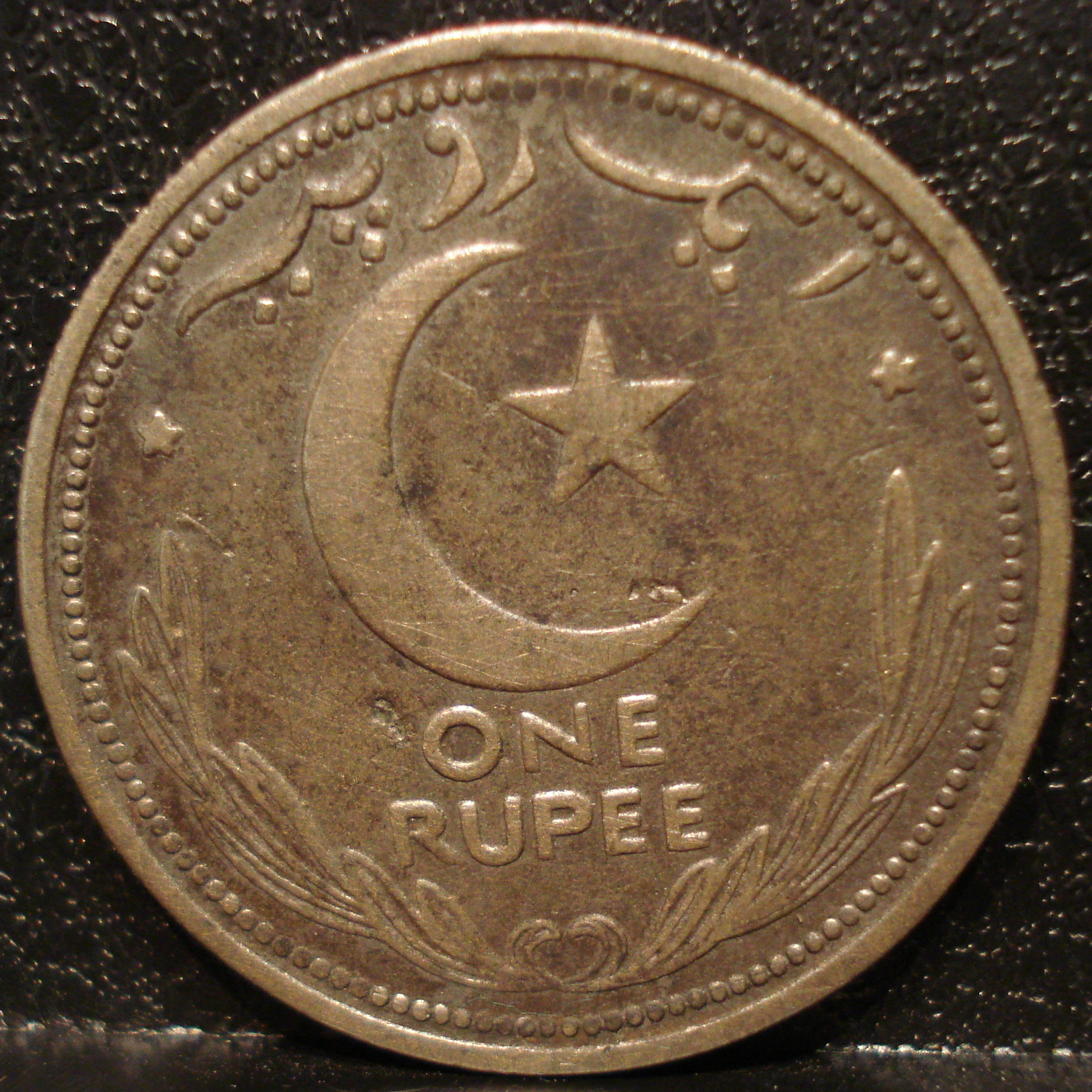
First one-rupee coin produced by the Government of Pakistan, 1948

Upon its independence, Pakistan suffered from several economic challenges as a result of the Partition of India. Over 6 million refugees from India to Pakistan, while several skilled non-Muslim artisans and labourers left Pakistan for the newly independent India. These occupational gaps in Pakistan's economy could not always be filled by Muslim refugees who had their own set of skills; for instance, insurance companies, manufacturing companies, clinics, and educational institutes were left crippled because their Hindu staff ventured to India. Moreover, India inherited most of British India's industrial hubs and ports, with Pakistan's only major port being Karachi. In 1950, Pakistan's per capita income was around $360 (in 1985 international dollars), and the literacy rate was only 10%. The nation encountered a lack of economic infrastructure, financial resources, and an industrial foundation, particularly with poverty rates ranging from 55% to 60% in West Pakistan.

Pakistan's economy was largely agrarian-based as agriculture constituted 53% of the country's GDP in 1947. With a population of approximately 30 million, including around 6 million residing in urban areas, about 65% of the labor force was engaged in agriculture. Agriculture contributed to 99.2% of exports and made up nearly 90% of foreign exchange earnings.

To coordinate economic development, the Pakistani government established a Development Board, a Planning Advisory Board, and an Economic Committee of the Cabinet. In 1948, Prime Minister Liaquat Ali Khan presented the first five-year plan of Pakistan to the Constituent Assembly, which was conceived by the Ministry of Finance. As a part of this plan, the State Bank of Pakistan was established while economic theories such as the cost-of-production theory of value where considered to kickstart economic development. The creation of this national bank gradually filled occupational gaps from partition as banking services were restored and government revenues increased.

The government opted to focus on the public sector to foster economic and industrial development because of the limited potential capital in the private sector. In the fiscal year 1949–50, Pakistan recorded a national savings rate of 2%, a foreign savings rate of 2%, and an investment rate of 4%. Manufacturing contributed 7.8% to the GDP, while services, trade, and other sectors accounted for a significant 39%, reflecting a policy centered around import-substituting industrialization. The trade balance of payments indicated a deficit of 66 million rupees (Rs) during the period spanning 1949/50 to 1950/51.

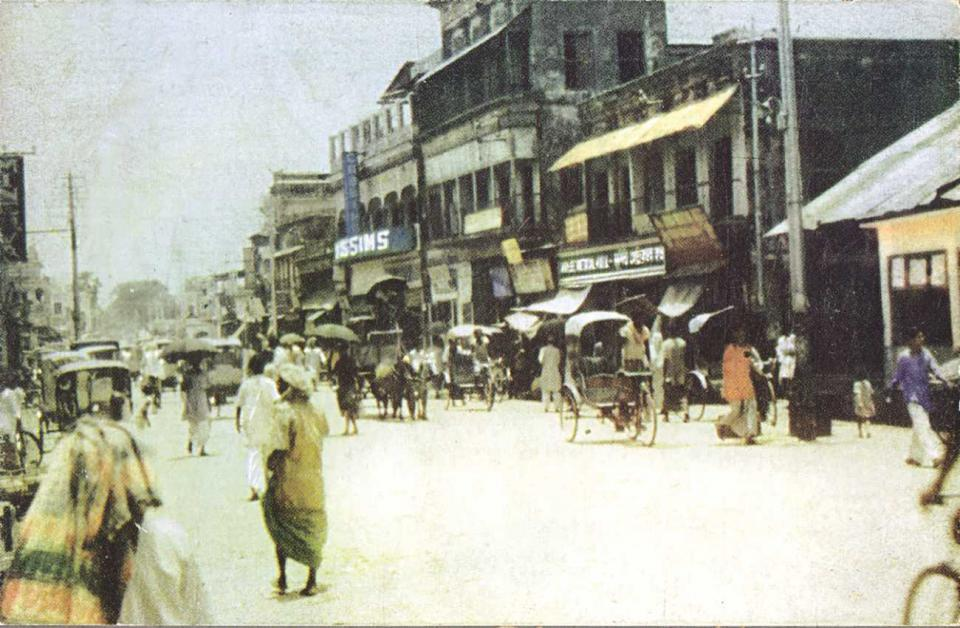
A market in Dacca, 1950

This five-year plan produced promising results as major urban centers such as Karachi, Dacca, and Khulna, grew tremendously and municipal services were expanded. There was a significant increase in the number of educational institutions in urban areas while health services substantially expanded. Housing areas were developed for about 500,000 refugees; however available facilities for basic services such as water supply were stretched by this population boost. Thousands of refugees still remained unhoused.

After the pound sterling was devalued by the British government in September 1949, Indo-Pakistani trade relations significantly deteriorated as India refused to recognize the Pakistani rupee. However, India decided to recognize the Pakistani rupee in February 1951 after a trade agreement with Pakistan, ending the trade war between the two countries.

In 1952, Pakistan imposed bans on the imports of cotton textiles and luxury goods, followed by comprehensive import regulations in 1953, propelling the country into the ranks of the fastest-growing nations. However, policies that favored industry over agriculture and unfavorable trade terms between agriculture and industry led to a decline in the annual growth rate of agriculture.

New studies were conducted in 1955 after the collapse of the first five-year plan. According to the census, over 90% of the population still lived in rural areas while only 10% lived in urban areas. In East Pakistan, the urban proportion was at 4.0% compared to 18.1% in West Pakistan.

== Demographics ==
=== Population ===
The First Census of Pakistan in 1951 enumerated 75.64 Million People, making Pakistan the 7th most populated nation in the world at the time and have a population density of 208 persons per square mile. About 55.6% of the population lived in East Pakistan while 44.4% of the population lived in West Pakistan. There were about 7,226,600 Muhajirs present in the entirety of Pakistan forming 9.8% of the total population. While 10.4% of the population was urban and 89.6% was rural. The literacy rate was 13.2%. The largest cities were Karachi, Lahore, Dacca (Dhaka), Chittagong (Chattogram) and Hyderabad.

=== Language ===
1. Bengali (54.4%)
2. Greater Punjabi (Note: Greater Punjabi here includes Punjabi, Saraiki and Hindko as they were considered the same at the time.) (27.6%)
3. Pashto (6.61%)
4. Sindhi (5.27%)
5. Urdu (3.25%)
6. Other (2.89%)

Out of the people enumerated 54.43% of the population identified Bengali as their mother tongue, making them a majority, 27.55% of the population identified as Punjabi (includes modern day Hindko and Saraiki), 6.61% identified their mother tongue as Pashto, 5.27% Sindhi, 3.25% Urdu and another 2.89% for smaller languages (Mostly Balochi, Brahui, Kohistani, Khowar and English).

== List of heads of state ==
=== Monarchs ===
From 1947 to 1956, Pakistan was a constitutional monarchy. The Pakistani monarch was the same person as the sovereign of the other Dominions in the British Commonwealth of Nations.

Portrait	Name	Birth	Reign	Death	Consort	Relationship with Predecessor(s)	Royal House
	George VI	14 December 1895	14 August 1947 – 6 February 1952	6 February 1952	Queen Elizabeth	None (position created); Emperor of India before partition	Windsor
	Elizabeth II	21 April 1926	6 February 1952 – 23 March 1956	8 September 2022	Prince Philip, Duke of Edinburgh	Daughter of George VI	Windsor

=== Governors-General ===
The Governor-General was the viceregal representative of the monarch in the Dominion of Pakistan.

Picture	Name (birth–death)	Took office	Left office	Appointer
	Muhammad Ali Jinnah (1876–1948)	15 August 1947	11 September 1948	George VI
	Sir Khawaja Nazimuddin (1894–1964)	14 September 1948	17 October 1951	George VI
	Sir Malik Ghulam Muhammad (1895–1956)	17 October 1951	7 August 1955	George VI
	Sir Malik Ghulam Muhammad (1895–1956)	17 October 1951	7 August 1955	Elizabeth II
	Iskander Mirza (1899–1969)	7 August 1955	23 March 1956	Elizabeth II

== See also ==
- Princely states of Pakistan
