= Abdul Qadir (banker) =

Governor State Bank of Pakistan (born 1903)

2nd Governor of the State Bank of Pakistan
- In office 20 July 1953 – 19 July 1960
- Preceded by: Zahid Hussain
- Succeeded by: Shujaat Ali Hasnie

Personal details
- Born: 1903 Jalandhar, Punjab, British India
- Occupation: Civil servant

Abdul Qadir (1903–unknown) was a Pakistani civil servant who served as a Governor of the State Bank of Pakistan and Finance Secretary of Pakistan.

== Early life and education ==
Abdul Qadir was born in 1903 in Jallandhar, British India. He studied at Forman Christian College in Lahore.

== Career ==
Before the partition of India in 1947, Qadir served in administrative and advisory positions within the Government of India. He was part of the Indian Audit and Accounts Services, working in the Accounts Offices of New Delhi, Nagpur, and Calcutta. In 1936, he transferred to the Ministry of Finance and was assigned to the Finance and Commerce Cadre. Later, he served as the Income Tax Commissioner for Punjab, Delhi, and the North-West Frontier Province (NWFP).

Following the creation of Pakistan, Qadir was appointed Joint Secretary in the Ministry of Finance and later became the chairman of the Central Board of Revenue. In 1950, he was appointed Secretary of the Ministry of Finance, becoming the first Pakistani to hold this position after succeeding Victor Turner.
