= Controller General of Accounts (Pakistan) =

The Controller General of Accounts (CGA) (Urdu: حسابدارِ اعلٰی حسابات پاکستان) is the premier accounting office of the Government of Pakistan. The Office is entrusted with the task of producing accurate and timely financial statements for the federation. It was formed under an ordinance issued in 2001. The Office achieves task through dedicated human resources, immense investment in infrastructure and strict quality control checks by the Senior Officers. It is also responsible for disbursing government money in form of payments of salaries and allowances to government servants and payments to contractors. All these transactions and any other transactions by Government of Pakistan, are captured in the SAP ERP and then the information is used to generate monthly, quarterly and yearly financials. The Controller General of Accounts is appointed by the President from amongst the officers of the Accounts Group and shall hold a civil service rank of BPS 22.

== Detailed functions ==
The functions of the Controller General are:

- to prepare and maintain the accounts of Pakistan, the Provinces and district governments in such forms and in accordance with such methods and principles as the Auditor-General may, with the approval of the President, prescribe from time to time.
- to authorize payments and withdrawals from the Consolidated Fund and Public Accounts of the Federal and Provincial Governments against approved budgetary provisions after pre-audited checks as the Auditor-General may, from time to time, prescribe.
- to prepare and maintain accounts of such organizations and authorities established, set up or controlled by the Federation or Provinces as may be assigned to him by the President or, as the case may be, the Governor of a Province.
- to lay down the principles governing the internal financial control for Government departments in consultation with the Ministry of Finance and the Provincial Finance departments as the case may be.
- to render advice on accounting proceeding for new scheme, programmes or activities undertaken by the Government concerned.
- to submit accounts compiled by him on any other person responsible in that behalf, after the close of each financial year, to the Auditor-General, showing under the respective heads, the annual receipts and disbursements for the purpose of Federation and of each Province within the time-frame prescribed by the Auditor-General.
- to provide, in so far as the accounts compiled by him permit, to the Federal Government or, as the case may be, the Provincial
- develop and maintain an efficient system of pension, provident funds and other retirement benefits in consultation with the concerned Government.
- to co-ordinate and ensure resolution of audit observation of the Audit Department with the concerned departments
- to prescribe syllabus, standards and provide facilities for the training of officers and staff under his administrative control.

== Certain offices to work under the control of the CGA ==
- The Controller General shall have such offices at the Federal, Provincial and district levels and such officers working in these offices as may be notified for this purpose by the Federal Government and the respective Provincial Government.
- Until such time the offices of the Controller General specified in sub-section (1) are notified the following accounting organizations shall work under the Controller General, namely:
  - the Accountant General of Pakistan Revenues and its sub-offices
  - the Military Accountant General and its sub-offices
  - the Offices of the Provincial Accountants General of each Province and the offices subordinate to them
  - the Chief Accounts Officers of the departmentalized accounting offices
  - any other departmentalized accounting organizations as well as their sub-offices.
- The Controller General shall be the administrative head of all the offices subordinate to him with full authority for transfer and posting within his organization.
