= Ministry of Economic Affairs (Pakistan) =

Government ministry of Pakistan

Agency overview
- Formed: January 2019; 7 years ago
- Jurisdiction: Government of Pakistan
- Headquarters: Pakistan Secretariat, Islamabad Capital Territory, Pakistan
- Minister responsible: Ahad Cheema, Federal Minister for Economic Affairs
- Agency executive: Dr. Kazim Niaz, Economic Affairs Secretary
- Website: Official Website

The Ministry of Economic Affairs, (abbreviated as MoEA) is a Cabinet-level ministry of the Government of Pakistan responsible for assessing, programming and negotiations of external economic assistance concerning the government and its constituent units from foreign governments and multilateral agencies.

== History ==
The Economic Affairs Division (EAD) plays a crucial role in managing Foreign Economic Assistance (FEA). EAD secures support from both bilateral and multilateral partners to fund important projects for the country's development.

FEA, which includes grants, loans, and technical assistance, helps bridge Pakistan's investment gap and improves its social and economic indicators. This assistance supports reforms in key sectors like energy and finance, contributing to economic growth.

EAD coordinates between implementing agencies and partners to ensure efficient project implementation. Through regular reviews, it aligns projects with national development goals.

The partnership between Pakistan and its development partners aims to manage FEA effectively for the benefit of the country's people. EAD continues to refine its strategies to drive Pakistan's economic and social development forward.

EAD also hosts Pakistan Development Forum and Donor Coordination Meetings.

== Functions ==
The functions and responsibilities of the Economic Affairs Division are:

- Assessment of requirements; programming and negotiations for external economic assistance from foreign Governments and organizations.
- Matters relating to IBRD, IDA, IFC, ADB and IFAD.
- Economic matters pertaining to the Economic and Social Council of the United Nations, Governing Council of UNDP, ESCAP (Economic and Social Commission for Asia and Pacific), Colombo Plan and OECD.
- Negotiations and coordination activities, etc., pertaining to economic cooperation with other countries (excluding RCD and IPECC).
- Assessment of requirements, programming and negotiation for securing technical assistance to Pakistan from foreign Governments organizations including nominations for EDI Courses.
- Matters relating to technical assistance to foreign countries.
- External debt management, including authorization of remittances for all external debt service, compilation and accounting and analysis of economic assistance from all foreign governments and organizations.
- Review and appraisal of international and regional economic trends and their impact on the national economy. Proposals concerning changes in International Economic Order.
- Matters relating to transfer of technology under UNDP assistance.
- Matters relating to International Islamic Development Bank.
- To provide technical assistance to friendly countries.
- To sign MoUs with local NGOs seeking foreign funding.

== Structure ==
EAD is headed by a Secretary, who is assisted by two Additional Secretaries, eight Joint Secretaries and one Chief in managing nine different Wings which perform duties in their respective functional areas based on territorial, economic and organizational demarcations. The Wings are:

1. World Bank Wing
2. ADB/Japan Wing
3. Administration Wing
4. UN Wing
5. China Wing
6. Paris Club [PC] Wing
7. Economic Cooperation [EC] Wing
8. Devolution-I Wing
9. Research & Statistics / IT / Debt Management Wing

== See also ==
- Economic Coordination Committee (Pakistan)
- Ministry of Finance (Pakistan)
- Board of Investment (Pakistan)
- Ministry of Commerce (Pakistan)
- Pakistan Development Forum
