= Imdad Ullah Bosal =

Finance Secretary of Pakistan

- امداد اللّٰہ بوسال

Finance Secretary, Pakistan
- Incumbent
- Assumed office 18 May 2023
- Appointed by: Establishment Division, Pakistan
- Preceded by: Hamid Yaqoob Sheikh

Chief Secretary, Government of Khyber Pakhtunkhwa
- In office 2 February 2023 – 21 March 2023
- Appointed by: Establishment Division, Pakistan
- Governor: Haji Ghulam Ali
- Chief Minister: Muhammad Azam Khan
- Preceded by: Shahzad Khan Bangash
- Succeeded by: Nadeem Aslam Chaudhry

Principal Secretary, Chief Minister of Punjab
- In office 20 June 2014 – 11 June 2018
- Appointed by: Services and General Administration Department, Punjab
- Chief Minister: Shehbaz Sharif
- Preceded by: Dr. Tauqir Shah
- Succeeded by: Capt. (Retd.) Muhammad Khurram Agha

Personal details
- Born: 14 June 1972 (age 54) Tibba Chaudhry Manak Bosal, Mandi Bahauddin, Pakistan
- Children: 3
- Parent: Chaudhry Muhammad Iqbal Bosal
- Relatives: Manak Khan Bosal (Paternal Grandfather); Jahan Khan Bosal (Maternal Grandfather); Nasir Iqbal Bosal (Brother); Akhtar Abbas Bosal (Cousin)
- Education: Cadet College Hasan Abdal; University of London; University of Oxford
- Occupation: Civil servant, Pakistan Administrative Service
- Awards: Sitara-i-Imtiaz

Imdad Ullah Bosal (Urdu: امداد اللّٰہ بوسال; born 14 June 1972) is a Pakistani civil servant who serves in BPS-22 grade as Secretary Finance Division. He was the Chief Secretary, Government of Khyber Pakhtunkhwa from February 2023 to March 2023. He belongs to the Pakistan Administrative Service.

== Early life and education ==
Imdad Ullah was born to Chaudhry Muhammad Iqbal Bosal. He hails from Tibba Chaudhry Manak Bosal, Mandi Bahauddin. He belongs to one of Punjab’s most politically influential and wealthy feudal families. His maternal grandfather Chaudhry Jahan Khan Bosal was elected as Member of Punjab Legislative Assembly in 1946 elections from Gujrat. His paternal grandfather Chaudhry Manak Khan Bosal, in whose name Imdad's ancestral village has been named, remained a Member of Sixth Legislator of Provincial Assembly of West Pakistan (1956-1969). His father Muhammad Iqbal Bosal was elected as Member National Assembly of Pakistan from Mandi Bahauddin by defeating Nazar Muhammad Gondal in 1997 general elections. His uncle Muhammad Nawaz Bosal remained a member of National Assembly of Pakistan for two terms, 1985 to 1988, and 1990 to 1993. He was also elected as a member of provincial assembly of Punjab in 1977. He is brother of Chaudhry Nasir Iqbal Bosal who is currently a Member National Assembly of Pakistan from Mandi Bahauddin, and remained MNA for two terms, 2013 to 2018, and 2018 to 2023. His cousin Akhtar Abbas Bosal is also a member of provincial assembly of Punjab, and remained an MPA from 2013 to 2018.

He got his early education from FG High School for Boys, Islamabad. Imdad attended Cadet College Hasan Abdal. He holds a master's degree in Political Economy of Development from School of Oriental and African Studies (SOAS), University of London. He also holds a master's degree in Public Policy from University of Oxford.

== Career in civil service ==
Imdad Ullah Bosal qualified Central Superior Services exam in 1994 and got allocation in District Management Group (now Pakistan Administrative Service) and belongs to 23rd Common Training Program.

He joined Pakistan Administrative Service on November 19, 1995. His date of retirement or superannuation from the civil service is June 13, 2032.

During his career in civil service, he has served as Federal Secretary of Industries and Production Division, Special Secretary, Additional Secretary (Expenditure), Additional Secretary (Banking, Investment & Inter-Governmental Finance) in Finance Division in years 2020 to 2022, Additional Secretary in Economic Affairs Division, Principal Secretary to Chief Minister of Punjab, and Secretary (Implementation) to Chief Minister of Punjab.

He was posted as Chief Secretary, Government of Khyber Pakhtunkhwa on 2 February 2023. He served in this capacity until 22 March 2023.

He was posted as Finance Secretary on May 18, 2023.

His other career appointments include Commissioner Lahore, Commissioner Rawalpindi, District Coordination Officer Rawalpindi (September 2008 to February 2011), Deputy Secretary, Additional Secretary, and Special Secretary in Finance Department, Government of the Punjab, and Additional Secretary in Health Department, Government of the Punjab.

He also received the Sitara-e-Imtiaz, which is the third-highest civilian award in Pakistan, on March 23, 2023. The government honored him for his twenty-eight years of outstanding public service, specifically recognizing his leadership in modernizing public finance and driving critical national economic reforms. [1]

== Other activities ==
- International Monetary Fund (IMF), Ex-Officio Alternate Member of the Board of Governors (since 2023)
