= List of international cricket centuries by Quinton de Kock =

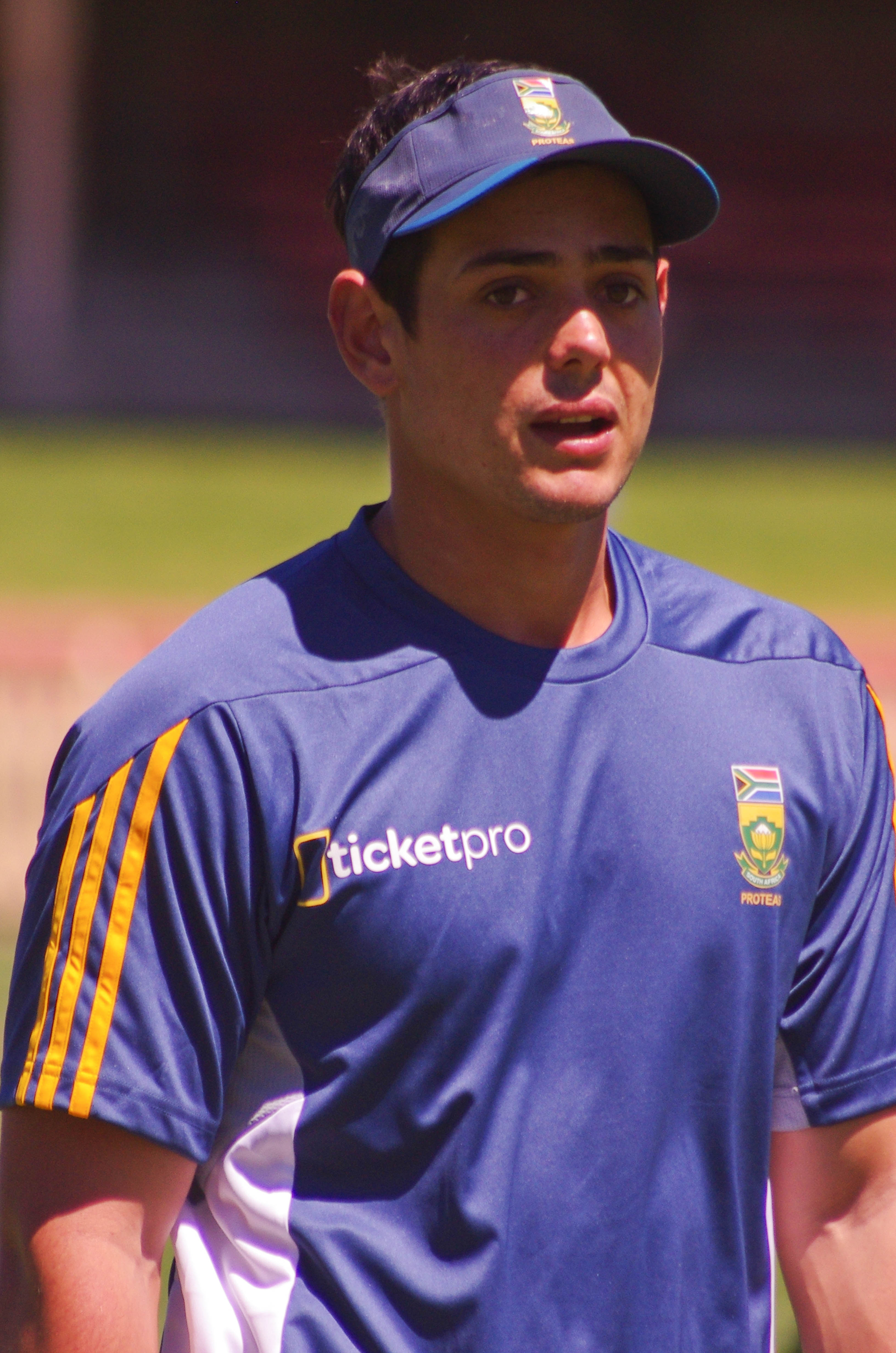
Quinton de Kock has scored 30 centuries in international cricket.

Quinton de Kock is a South African international cricketer, who plays as a wicketkeeper-batsman. As of January 2026, he has scored 31 centuries for South Africa: 6 in Tests, 23 in One Day Internationals (ODIs) and 2 in Twenty20 Internationals (T20Is).

After making his Test debut in 2014, de Kock scored his first Test century against England in January 2016. His last Test century was also his highest score: 141 not out against the West Indies in June 2021.

de Kock scored his maiden ODI century against Pakistan in November 2013. The following month, he scored centuries in three consecutive ODIs against India. This is the equal second highest number of consecutive ODI centuries, behind Kumar Sangakkara's four. de Kock's highest ODI score is 178 against Australia in September 2016. He scored four centuries at the 2023 World Cup, the most by any player. de Kock's three scores of 150 or more constitute the most by a designated wicketkeeper in ODIs.

de Kock's maiden T20I century came when he scored exactly 100 against the West Indies in March 2023.

== Key ==
* * – Remained not out
* † – Man of the match
* (DLS) – The result of the match was based upon the Duckworth–Lewis–Stern method

== Test centuries ==
List of Test centuries scored by Quinton de Kock
No.	Score	Against	Pos.	Inn.	Test	Venue	H/A/N	Date	Result	Ref
1	129*	England	7	1	4/4	Centurion Park, Centurion	Home	22 January 2016	Won	
2	104	Australia	7	2	2/3	Bellerive Oval, Hobart	Away	12 November 2016	Won	
3	101	Sri Lanka	7	1	2/3	Newlands Cricket Ground, Cape Town	Home	2 January 2017	Won	
4	129	Pakistan	7	3	3/3	Wanderers Stadium, Johannesburg	Home	11 January 2019	Won	
5	111	India	7	2	1/3	ACA–VDCA Cricket Stadium, Visakhapatnam	Away	2 October 2019	Lost	
6	141* †	West Indies	6	2	1/2	Daren Sammy Cricket Ground, Gros Islet	Away	10 June 2021	Won	

== One Day International centuries ==
List of ODI centuries scored by Quinton de Kock
No.	Score	Against	Pos.	Inn.	S/R	Venue	H/A/N	Date	Result	Ref
1	112	Pakistan	1	1	82.96	Sheikh Zayed Stadium, Abu Dhabi	Neutral	8 November 2013	Won	
2	135 †	India	2	1	111.57	Wanderers Stadium, Johannesburg	Home	5 December 2013	Won	
3	106 †	India	1	1	89.83	Kingsmead, Durban	Home	8 December 2013	Won	
4	101	India	2	1	84.16	Centurion Park, Centurion	Home	11 December 2013	No result	
5	128	Sri Lanka	2	1	100.78	Mahinda Rajapaksa International Cricket Stadium, Hambantota	Away	12 July 2014	Won	
6	107 †	Australia	2	1	86.99	Sydney Cricket Ground, Sydney	Away	23 November 2014	Lost (DLS)	
7	103	India	1	1	87.28	Saurashtra Cricket Association Stadium, Rajkot	Away	18 October 2015	Won	
8	109 †	India	1	1	125.28	Wankhede Stadium, Mumbai	Away	25 October 2015	Won	
9	138* †	England	1	2	143.75	Mangaung Oval, Bloemfontein	Home	3 February 2016	Won	
10	135 †	England	1	2	115.38	Centurion Park, Centurion	Home	9 February 2016	Won	
11	178 †	Australia	1	2	157.52	Centurion Park, Centurion	Home	30 September 2016	Won	
12	109	Sri Lanka	1	1	125.28	Centurion Park, Centurion	Home	10 February 2017	Won	
13	168* †	Bangladesh	1	2	115.86	De Beers Diamond Oval, Kimberley	Home	15 October 2017	Won	
14	121 †	Sri Lanka	1	1	112.03	Kingsmead Cricket Ground, Durban	Home	10 March 2019	Won	
15	107 †	England	1	1	94.69	Newlands Cricket Ground, Cape Town	Home	4 February 2020	Won	
16	120	Ireland	2	1	131.86	The Village, Malahide	Away	16 July 2021	Won	
17	124 †	India	1	1	95.38	Newlands Cricket Ground, Cape Town	Home	23 January 2022	Won	
18	100	Sri Lanka	1	1	119.04	Arun Jaitley Cricket Stadium, Delhi	Neutral	7 October 2023	Won	
19	109 †	Australia	1	1	102.83	BRSABV Ekana Cricket Stadium, Lucknow	Neutral	12 October 2023	Won	
20	174 †	Bangladesh	1	1	124.28	Wankhede Stadium, Mumbai	Neutral	24 October 2023	Won	
21	114	New Zealand	1	1	98.27	Maharashtra Cricket Association Stadium, Pune	Neutral	1 November 2023	Won	
22	123* †	Pakistan	2	2	103.36	Iqbal Stadium, Faisalabad	Away	6 November 2025	Won	
23	106	India	1	1	119.10	ACA-VDCA Cricket Stadium, Visakhapatnam	Away	6 December 2025	Lost	

== Twenty20 International centuries ==
List of T20I centuries scored by Quinton de Kock
No.	Score	Against	Pos.	Inn.	S/R	Venue	H/A/N	Date	Result	Ref
1	100 †	West Indies	1	2	227.27	Centurion Park, Centurion	Home	23 March 2023	Won	
2	115 †	West Indies	2	2	234.69	Centurion Park, Centurion	Home	29 January 2026	Won	

== See also ==
- List of cricketers with centuries in all international formats
