= Inland Revenue Service =

Inland Revenue Service may refer to:

- Federal Inland Revenue Service, Nigeria
- Inland Revenue, United Kingdom
- Inland Revenue Service (Pakistan)
