= Directorate General of Intelligence and Investigation =

Intelligence wing of Federal Board of Revenue, Pakistan

Directorate General of Intelligence and Investigation DG I&I

Agency overview
- Formed: 2011
- Preceding agency: Director General of Broadening of Tax Base FBR

Jurisdictional structure
- Federal agency: Pakistan
- Operations jurisdiction: Pakistan
- Governing body: Federal Board of Revenue
- General nature: Federal law enforcement; Civilian police

Operational structure
- Headquarters: Islamabad
- Agency executive: Muhammad Ali Raza Hanjra, Director General

The Directorate General of Intelligence and Investigation (DG I&I) (Urdu: نظامتِ عمومی برائے سراغرسانی و تفتیش) operates as a department under the Federal Board of Revenue (FBR) in Pakistan. While its core function is to serve as the intelligence wing of the FBR, it is actively engaged in the day-to-day investigation of revenue-related crimes and offenses.

The Directorate General of Intelligence and Investigation (DG I&I) is structured with key positions including a Director General, a Director HQs, and three Directors situated in Karachi, Lahore, and Faisalabad. The operational core of this organization is formed by the existing Vigilance units operating under Dte. Gen. I&I, FBR (Customs Intelligence), which are currently staffed by officers and officials specializing in Inland Revenue (IR). These units contribute significantly to the functioning and operations of DG I&I.

== History ==
The Directorate General of Intelligence and Investigation - Inland Revenue (DG I&I - IR) was officially rebranded from the pre-existing role of the Director General of Broadening of Tax Base FBR on March 25, 2011. The organization's primary functions encompass expanding the tax base, accessing significant databases, cross-referencing data with master indices and tax profiles, managing complaints referred by the Chairman FBR under the FBR Act, conducting financial investigations, and discreetly gathering information concerning all tax-related matters.

== Initiatives ==
=== Empowerment of IR’s Intelligence Wing ===
In 2021 the Federal Board of Revenue (FBR) has extended additional powers to the Directorate of Intelligence and Investigation (I&I) - Inland Revenue. This expansion involves broadening the functions, jurisdiction, and powers of the Director General of Intelligence and Investigation - Inland Revenue (DG I&I-IR) and the officers under its purview.

=== Separation of Cases of Tax Evasion and Money Laundering ===
In 2023 the Director General of Intelligence and Investigation - Inland Revenue (DG I&I-IR) has initiated a process to segregate cases involving tax evasion from those related to money laundering. This effort aims to prevent the prosecution of individuals within the business community for money laundering when their actions primarily pertain to tax fraud. The agency acknowledges the distinction that not every case of tax evasion should be treated as a money laundering case, reflecting a more nuanced approach to enforcement and prosecution.

== Director Generals ==
- Muhammad Ali Raza Hanjra

Mr. Muhammad Ali Raza Hanjra (Pakistan Customs Service/BS-21) moved to Director General, Directorate General of Intelligence & Investigation, FBR, Islamabad. The officer is also assigned the additional charge of the post of Project Director (ITTMS), Federal Board of Revenue (HQ), Islamabad. He is transferred from Project Director, (ITTMS) Federal Board of Revenue (Hq), Islamabad.
