= Melody Market =

- Commercial area
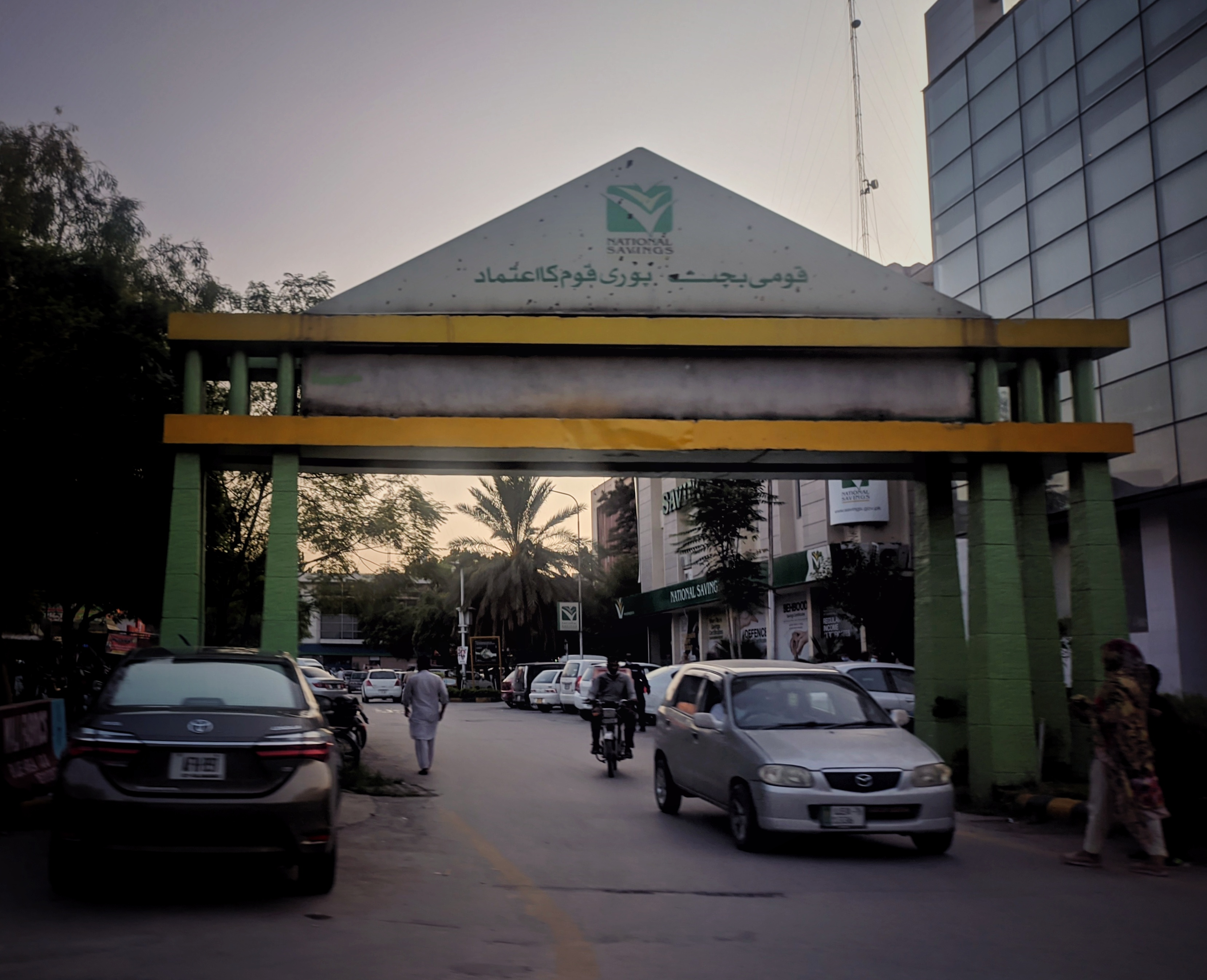
- Country: Pakistan
- Territory: Islamabad Capital Territory
- Sector: G-6

Melody Market, also referred to as G-6 Markaz or the Civic Center, is a commercial area and marketplace situated near the Lal Masjid in Sector G-6 of Islamabad, Pakistan.

The area serves as a hub for several major government institutions, including the headquarters of the National Accountability Bureau (NAB), the Metropolitan Corporation, the National Police Bureau, and the Central Directorate of National Savings.

== History ==
Melody Market was designed by a firm of English architects, with construction commencing in 1965. A food park was established within the commercial area in 2003 and was inaugurated by Moinuddin Haider, the former Interior Minister of Pakistan. It attracted approximately 7,000 daily visitors.

The Siege of Lal Masjid and a 2008 bombing took place in the vicinity of the market.
