= National Savings (Pakistan) =

State-owned savings bank of Pakistan

- Native name: مرکزی نظامت برائے قومی بچت
- Formerly: National Savings Bureau (1873), National Savings Organization (1972)
- Company type: Government agency
- Industry: Financial services
- Founded: 1873; 153 years ago
- Headquarters: 23-N, Savings House, G-6 Markaz, Islamabad, Pakistan
- Key people: Hamid Raza Khalid, Director General
- Products: Savings and Investments
- Website: savings.gov.pk

The Central Directorate of National Savings is a Pakistani state-owned savings bank, operating as an attached department under the Finance Division, Ministry of Finance led by the Director General. It is based in Melody Market, Islamabad.

National Savings serves as an intermediary which raises funds from individual savers to help finance the government's fiscal deficit through non-bank means.

== History ==
The history of the National Savings Organisation in Pakistan dates back to the British Raj when the Government Savings Bank Act, 1873 was promulgated. During the First and Second World War, the British government used the then National Savings Bureau (NSB) to raise funds to meet war-related expenses. After Pakistan won independence in 1947, the organisation continued to operate as NSB, before being renamed to Central Directorate of National Savings (CDNS) in 1953. In August 1960, the CDNS was given the status of an "Attached Department" of the Ministry of Finance and made responsible for all policy matters and execution of various National Savings Schemes (NSS). The present structure of CDNS was set up in early 1972 under the Ministry of Finance.

In August 2019, the government decided to turn National Savings Organisation from a government agency into a corporation that will run under the government. Relevant legislation in this regard, Pakistan Savings Bill 2019, is prepared and being finalized. The prize bond scheme was launched with a Prize Bond of Rs 100. The scheme has been expanded over time. Today there are Prize Bonds of six denominations, including Rs 100, 200, 750, 1500, 25000 and Rs 40000.

== Finances ==
The organisation manages investments worth Rs. 4.04 trillion (US$14 billion) as of FY 2018–19; an amount that is 25% of the country's net savings - making it the largest financial institution in Pakistan. It has 7 million customers, of which 47% are female, leading it to become the financial institution that is closest to gender parity in the country. The organisation sets the rate of interests based on the borrowing cost of government against wholesale debt instruments (Treasury Bills, Pakistan Investment Bonds).

== Operations ==
National Savings organisational structure is based on directorates and branches. The Central Directorate, or headquarters, is located in G-6 Markaz, Islamabad. The organisation's regional directorates are located in Lahore, Gujranwala, Faisalabad, Karachi, Quetta, Hyderabad, Multan, Sukkur, Bahawalpur, Islamabad, Abbottabad, and Peshawar. Under these regional directorates, there are 376 branches of National Savings Centres across the country.

== Investment ==
Total investment in National Savings amounts to Rs3.4 trillion.

== Products ==
The organisation offers several savings and investment products; including prize bonds, saving certificates, and saving accounts. Most products are available to resident and non-resident Pakistanis, however, some products have restricted access and require specified criteria to be met before they are offered. These restricted access products are italicized in the following products list:

=== Behbood Savings Certificates ===
Behbood Saving Certificates are designed as both a social welfare initiative and an investment instrument. The scheme is aimed at providing a stable monthly income to eligible investors, ensuring financial independence and protection for those who may be economically vulnerable. Its risk-free nature is underpinned by the sovereign guarantee of the Government of Pakistan. Initiated in 2003, the Behbood Saving Certificates scheme was developed in response to the financial needs of Pakistan's senior citizens, widows, and disabled individuals. Key features of the Behbood Saving Certificates include:

- High Profit Rates: Among the most competitive within Pakistan's national savings schemes, ensuring a substantial monthly income.
- Investment Limits: The minimum deposit is PKR 5,000. Individual investments are capped at PKR 5 million, while joint investments may go up to PKR 10 million.
- Tax and Zakat Exemptions: Profits are exempt from withholding tax and compulsory Zakat, enhancing the net return for investors.
- Reduced Tax Rates: BSC profits are taxed as normal taxable income under NTR—not under Section 7B—with a maximum tax rate of 5%, unlike the progressive rates on bank deposits.

==== Eligibility and Target Groups ====
The scheme is exclusively available to:

1. Senior Citizens: Individuals aged 60 years and above.
2. Widows: Women who have lost their spouses, and not married again, regardless of age.
3. Individuals with Disabilities: Persons holding a valid medical certification confirming their disability.
4. Joint Accounts: Accounts can be opened jointly, allowing collaborative investments as in clause (a) and (b) in their joint names.

=== Other products ===
- Prize Bonds
- Premium Prize Bonds
- Regular Income Certificates
- Defence Savings Certificates
- Special Savings Certificates
- Short Term Savings Certificates
- Pensioners Benefit Account
- Shuhadas Family Welfare Account
- Special Savings Account
- Savings Account
