= Finance Secretary (Pakistan) =

Administrative post of the Ministry of Finance

Finance Secretary of Pakistan
- معتمدِ خزانہ پاکستان
- Incumbent; Imdad Ullah Bosal
- Reports to: Prime Minister of Pakistan
- Appointer: Prime Minister of Pakistan
- First holder: Sir Victor Turner
- Website: Ministry of Finance

The Finance secretary of Pakistan (Urdu: معتمدِ خزانہ پاکستان) is the federal secretary for the Ministry of Finance. The federal finance secretary is one of the most powerful bureaucrats in the country. Being the head of the Finance Division, the secretary plays an important part in shaping the country's economic and financial policies. The position holder is a BPS-22 grade officer, usually belonging to the Pakistan Administrative Service. The current finance secretary is Imdadullah Bosal. The finance secretary is assisted by one Special Secretary of grade 22, six additional secretaries of grade 21 and one Special Assistant of grade 17-18, the most number of deputies any secretary has in the federal government, due to the enormous workload.

== List of secretaries ==
No.	Name	Entered office	Left office
1	Sir Victor Turner	14 August 1947	1 February 1950
2	Abdul Qadir	2 February 1950	25 February 1952
3	Mumtaz Hasan	25 February 1952	1 November 1958
4	Hafiz Abdul Majid	1 November 1958	29 July 1960
5	Mohammed Ayub	29 July 1960	19 June 1961
6	Mumtaz Mirza	19 June 1961	6 March 1963
7	Mirza Muzaffar Ahmad	6 March 1963	30 May 1966
8	Ghulam Ishaq Khan	31 May 1966	8 September 1970
9	Aftab Ghulam Nabi Kazi	8 September 1970	20 August 1973
10	Abdur Rauf Shaikh	20 August 1973	6 October 1977
11	Aftab Ahmad Khan	9 October 1977	1 August 1979
12	Habibullah Baig	1 August 1979	7 June 1987
13	Izharul Haq	8 June 1987	14 August 1988
14	Saeed Ahmad Qureshi	15 August 1988	21 January 1989
15	R.A. Akhund	22 January 1989	August 1990
16	Saeed Ahmad Qureshi	September 1990	31 July 1991
17	Qazi Alimullah	1 August 1991	24 September 1992
18	Khalid Javed	25 September 1992	24 April 1993
19	Qazi Alimullah	28 October 1993	30 June 1994
20	Javed Talat	30 June 1994	1 March 1996
21	Mian Tayeb Hasan	1 March 1996	31 October 1996
22	Chaudhry Mueen Afzal	1 November 1996	5 November 1998
23	Khalid Javed	5 November 1998	21 October 1999
24	Muhammad Younis Khan	22 October 1999	July 2002
25	Nawid Ahsan	July 2002	January 2006
26	Tanwir Ali Agha	January 2006	July 2007
27	Ahmad Waqar	20 July 2007	8 January 2008
28	Dr. Waqar Masood Khan	9 January 2008	2 May 2008
29	Farrukh Qayyum	3 May 2008	1 September 2008
30	Dr. Waqar Masood Khan	2 September 2008	3 February 2009
31	Salman Siddiq	4 February 2009	20 December 2010
32	Dr. Waqar Masood Khan	21 December 2010	11 February 2012
33	Abdul Wajid Rana	12 February 2012	April 2013
34	Dr. Waqar Masood Khan	April 2013	20 January 2017
35	Tariq Bajwa	3 February 2017	17 June 2017
36	Shahid Mahmood	17 June 2017	5 January 2018
37	Arif Ahmed Khan	10 January 2018	21 March 2019
38	Mohammad Younus Dagha	22 March 2019	23 May 2019
39	Naveed Kamran Baloch	23 May 2019	24 December 2020
40	Kamran Ali Afzal	24 December 2020	30 May 2021
41	Yusuf Khan	30 May 2021	3 December 2021
42	Hamid Yaqoob Sheikh	3 December 2021	18 May 2023
43	Imdad Ullah Bosal	18 May 2023	

== See also ==
- Finance Minister of Pakistan
- Governor of State Bank of Pakistan
- Planning Commission (Pakistan)
- Cabinet Secretary of Pakistan
- Interior Secretary of Pakistan
- Pakistan Secretary of Economic Affairs
- Commerce Secretary of Pakistan
- Planning and Development Secretary of Pakistan
