= Pakistan Development Forum =

Annual event regarding economic assistance to the Govt of Pakistan

The Pakistan Development Forum (PDF) convenes annually, bringing together the Government of Pakistan and its development partners to address diverse development challenges. It serves as a platform for sharing information, discussing key issues, and fostering collaboration to find solutions. The forum's proceedings, including presentations and statements, are documented in a report, with additional thematic context provided in background briefs. These resources extend the utility of the forum's discussions beyond the event itself, contributing to ongoing development efforts.

== See also ==
- Ministry of Economic Affairs (Pakistan)
