= Shan Masood =

Pakistani cricketer (born 1989)

Shan Masood Khan
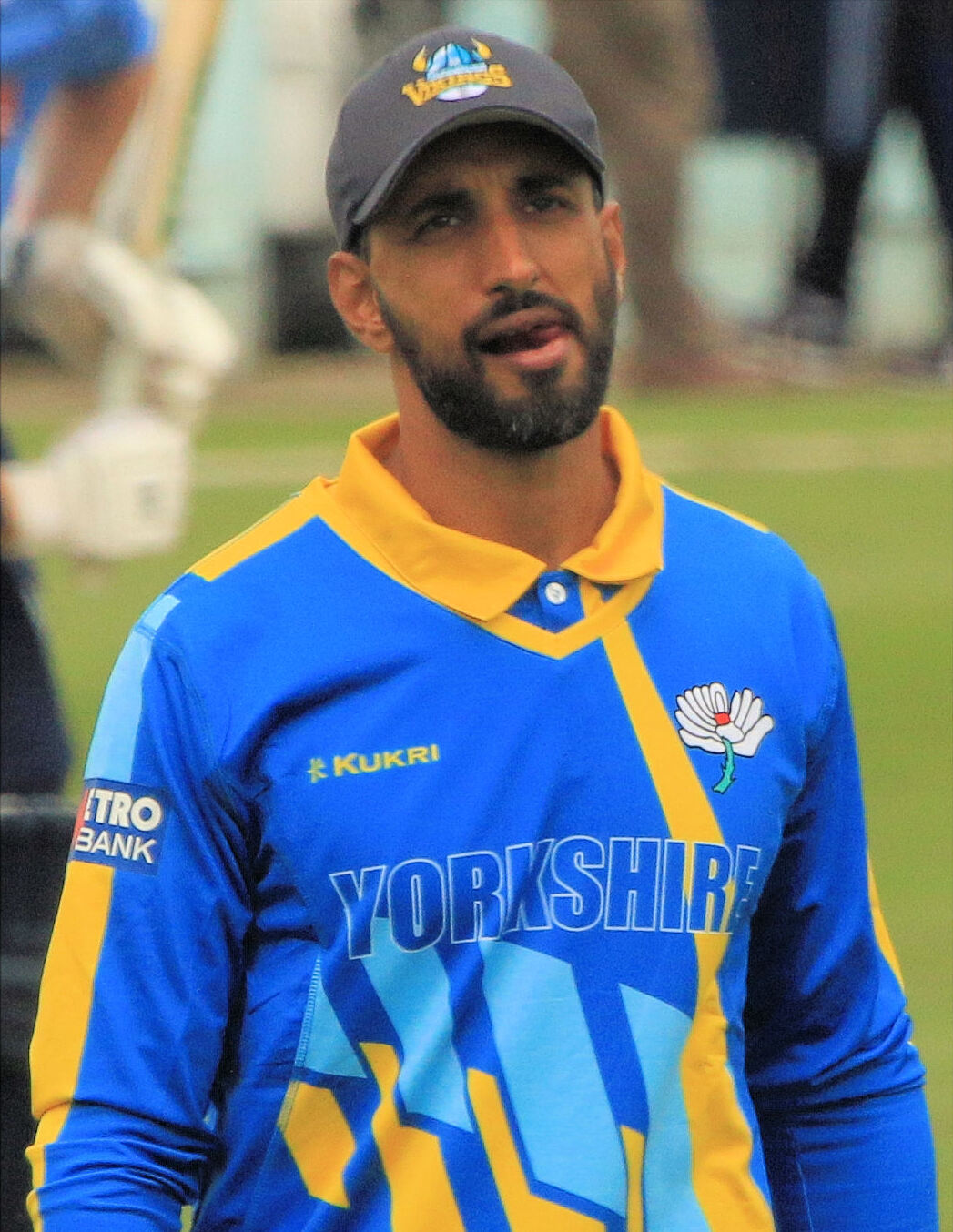
- Masood in 2023

Personal information
- Full name: Shan Masood Khan
- Born: 14 October 1989 (age 37); Kuwait City, Kuwait
- Nickname: Shaani
- Height: 6 ft 3 in (191 cm)
- Batting: Left-handed
- Bowling: Right-arm fast-medium
- Role: Opening batsman
- Relatives: Waqar Masood Khan (uncle)

International information
- National side: Pakistan (2013–present)
- Test debut (cap 213): 14 October 2013 v South Africa
- Last Test: 9 September 2026 v England
- ODI debut (cap 221): 22 March 2019 v Australia
- Last ODI: 7 May 2023 v New Zealand
- ODI shirt no.: 94
- T20I debut (cap 97): 20 September 2022 v England
- Last T20I: 13 November 2022 v England
- T20I shirt no.: 94

Domestic team information
- Years: Team
- 2007/08: Karachi Whites
- 2019–2023 2026–present: Multan Sultans (squad no. 94)
- 2019–2021: Southern Punjab (squad no. 94)
- 2021: Bagh Stallions (squad no. 94)
- 2022: Derbyshire (squad no. 94)
- 2022–2023: Balochistan (squad no. 94)
- 2023–2024: Yorkshire (squad no. 94)
- 2023–present: Karachi Whites (squad no. 94)
- 2024-2025: Karachi Kings (squad no. 94)
- 2024/25: Hampshire (squad no. 94)
- 2025: Leicestershire

Career statistics
| Competition | Test | ODI | FC | LA |
|---|---|---|---|---|
| Matches | 50 | 9 | 205 | 142 |
| Runs scored | 2,926 | 163 | 13,751 | 6,413 |
| Batting average | 30.80 | 18.11 | 40.56 | 53.00 |
| 100s/50s | 7/15 | 0/1 | 34/61 | 17/39 |
| Top score | 156 | 50 | 239 | 182* |
| Balls bowled | 144 | – | 893 | 24 |
| Wickets | 2 | – | 8 | 2 |
| Bowling average | 46.00 | – | 76.62 | 8.50 |
| 5 wickets in innings | 0 | – | 0 | 0 |
| 10 wickets in match | 0 | – | 0 | 0 |
| Best bowling | 1/6 | – | 2/52 | 2/0 |
| Catches/stumpings | 33/– | 2/– | 118/– | 39/– |
- Source: ESPNcricinfo, 12 September 2026

Shan Masood Khan (Urdu: شان مسعود; born 14 October 1989) is a Pakistani left-handed batter who has played for the Pakistan national cricket team since 2013. He captained Pakistan in Test matches from 2023 to 2026. Previously, he served as a captain of Karachi Kings, Multan Sultans, Southern Punjab, and Yorkshire County Cricket Club.

In August 2018, he was one of thirty-three players to be awarded a central contract for the 2018–19 season by the Pakistan Cricket Board (PCB).

== Early life and education ==
Shan Masood was born in 1989 in Kuwait, where his father worked in a bank. Following the Iraqi invasion of Kuwait and the start of the Gulf War, the family left for their native Pakistan, settling down in Karachi again.

His father Mansoor Masood Khan, apart from being a professional banker, always had an interest in sports, himself playing hockey at provincial level while loving cricket as well and encouraging his son to be invested in the field. Mansoor became a member of the governing board in the Pakistan Cricket Board in 2014.

His paternal uncle, Waqar Masood Khan, is a retired civil servant who served as Pakistan's longest serving Federal Secretary for Finance. His elder sister died in 2021 while his younger brother Ali is a barrister.

After moving to the United Kingdom with his parents, he studied at Stamford School, Lincolnshire and then Durham University where he studied economics. He studied Management and Sports Sciences at Loughborough University through a distance learning programme.

== Domestic career ==
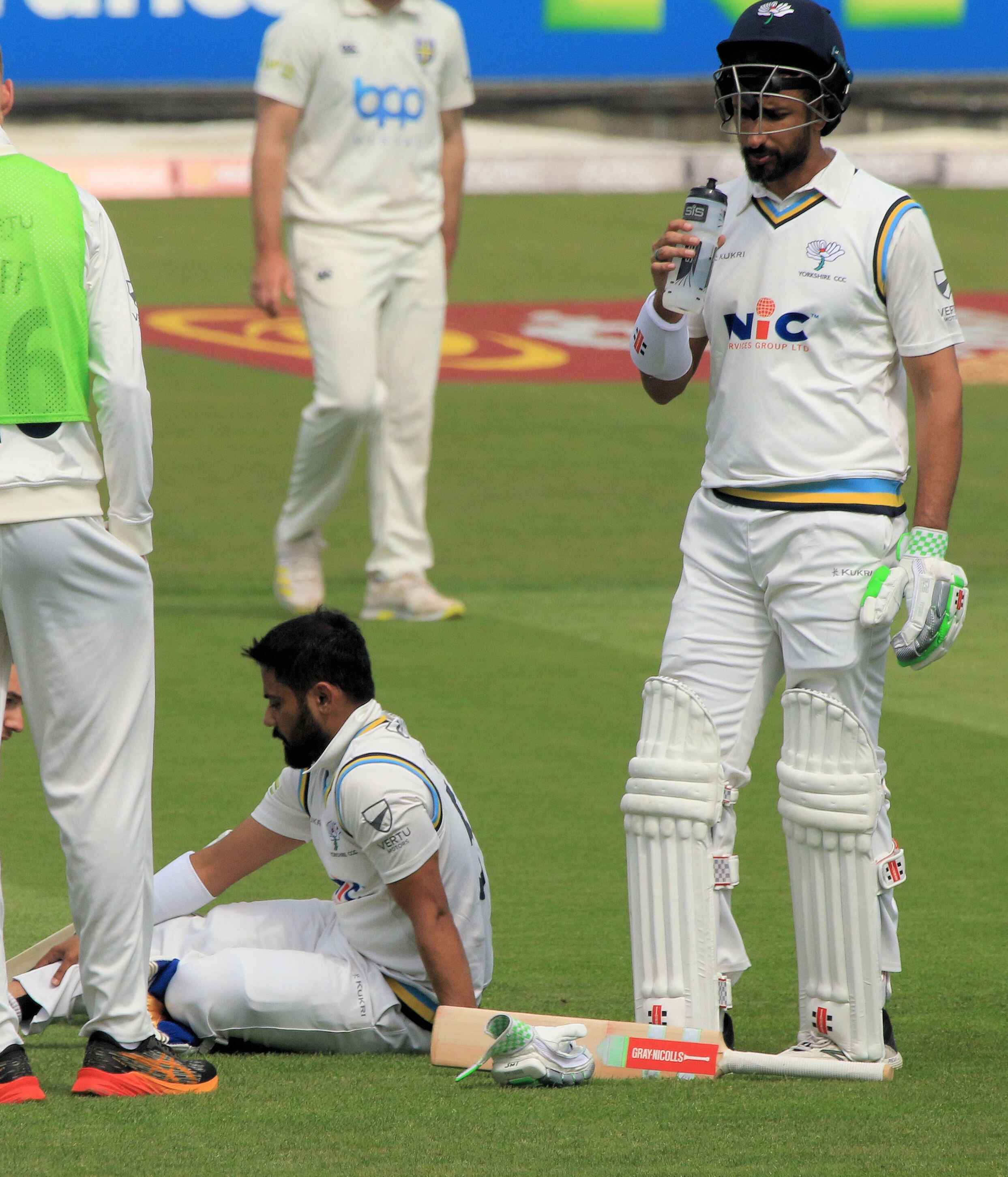
Masood captained Yorkshire in the 2023 County Championship.

=== Pakistan ===
In his first-class debut in the 2007–08 season of Quaid-e-Azam Trophy, Masood scored 54 for Karachi Whites against Hyderabad as part of a 154-run opening stand with Asad Shafiq.

In April 2018, he was named the vice-captain of Khyber Pakhtunkhwa's squad for the 2018 Pakistan Cup.

In September 2019, Masood was named as the captain of Southern Punjab for the 2019–20 Quaid-e-Azam Trophy tournament.

He is captain of Bagh Stallions in the Kashmir Premier League.

=== England ===
Earlier, he had played three first-class games for Durham University.

In December 2021, he was signed by Derbyshire for the 2022 county season. In April 2022, in the second round of matches in the 2022 County Championship, Shan scored his maiden double century in first-class cricket, scoring an unbeaten 201 runs on the opening day against Sussex. In the following match, Shan scored another double century, becoming the first batsman for Derbyshire to score back-to-back double centuries in first-class cricket. In May 2022, he scored his third century for Derbyshire against Worcestershire.

Masood was appointed captain of the Yorkshire County Cricket Club for the 2023 County season.

== International career ==
In October 2013, Masood made his Test debut in the first test against South Africa scoring 75 runs, at the Sheikh Zayed Cricket Stadium. He became only the third Pakistan batsman to score a half-century and a duck on Test debut.

In July 2015, he scored his maiden century against Sri Lanka at Pallekele, putting on 242 for the third wicket with Younis Khan as Pakistan scored 382 to complete their highest successful chase. Masood, a part-time medium pacer, bowled for the first time in Test cricket on 23 July 2016 against England at Old Trafford. His first delivery was a no ball.

In September 2018, he was named in Pakistan's One Day International (ODI) squad for the 2018 Asia Cup, but he did not play. In January 2019, he was named in Pakistan's ODI squad for their series against South Africa, but again he did not play. In March 2019, he was named in Pakistan's ODI squad for their series against Australia. He made his ODI debut for Pakistan against Australia on 22 March 2019.

In December 2019, he scored his second Test century, against the touring Sri Lankans at the National Stadium, Karachi. In the same match, he also scored his 1,000th run in Test cricket.

In February 2020, Masood made his third Test century, against Bangladesh at Rawalpindi.

In June 2020, he was named in a 29-man squad for Pakistan's tour to England during the COVID-19 pandemic. In July, he was shortlisted in Pakistan's 20-man squad for the Test matches against England. In August 2020, Masood scored 156 in the first Test against England, his fourth century in Test cricket, at the Old Trafford.

In November 2020, he was named in Pakistan's 35-man squad for their tour to New Zealand.

In September 2022, he was named in the Pakistan's T20I squad for the series against England. He made his T20I debut on 20 September 2022, against England. Masood was also named as part of the Pakistan squad for the 2022 T20 World Cup.

In January 2023, he was named as the vice-captain of the Pakistan's ODI team for their home series against New Zealand.

=== Captaincy ===
In November 2023, he was named as the captain of the Pakistan national cricket team in the test format.

Under his captaincy, Pakistan lost the three-match test series against Australia by 3-0 where he scored a total of 181 runs.

Masood was retained as Pakistan's captain for the two-match Test series against Bangladesh that ended in a 2–0 home series loss in Rawalpindi.

Masood was again retained as Pakistan's captain for the three-test home series against England. In the first Test, Masood scored his fifth test century and surpassed the 2,000 runs milestone in Tests. He also became the 17th Pakistan captain to score a hundred in the test format. In the second test, Pakistan's win marked Masood's first victory since taking over as captain, after six consecutive defeats in a row. Pakistan won the third Test in Rawalpindi for a 2–1 series win.

His next assignment as Pakistan's Test captain was a two-match away series against South Africa. In the first Test, he got a couple of starts but was unable to convert them into a big score, as Pakistan lost a nail-biter by two wickets. In the second Test, after being dismissed for a low score in the first innings, he scored his sixth Test century in the second innings. Despite his hundred, Pakistan went on to lose the match and the series 2–0.

After the 2-0 away series against Bangladesh in May 2026, Masood stepped down as captain.

== See also ==
- List of Test cricketers born in non-Test playing nations

| Preceded by Babar Azam | Pakistani national cricket captain (Test); 2023–2026 | Succeeded by Babar Azam |
