= 2008 Lal Masjid bombing =

Terrorist attack in Islamabad

The Lal Masjid bombing
- Location: Melody Market near Lal Masjid, Islamabad, Pakistan
- Date: July 6, 2008; 18 years ago
- Attack type: Suicide attack; mass murder; domestic terrorism

The Lal Masjid bombing was a domestic terrorist bombing near the Lal Masjid mosque in Islamabad, the capital of Pakistan, on 6 July 2008 at 7:50 pm local time, when a 30-year-old suicide bomber blew himself up killing 18 policemen and 1 civilian.

The bombing occurred on the first anniversary of the siege of Lal Masjid and was likely a revenge attack. The attack occurred even amid tight security in Islamabad, where thousands of Islamic students in Pakistan came to mark the day when Pakistani troops stormed Lal Masjid. Pakistani Interior Minister Rehman Malik, who visited the blast site, said about 12,000 students attended the rally and the attack was directed at police.

== Reaction ==
=== Domestic ===
- Minister for Information and Broadcasting – Sherry Rehman said the "government would never tolerate such acts and the perpetrators would be taken to task. Neither our religion nor any welfare state allows such acts. This is a hopeless attempt by those against the country and the democracy."
- Tehrik-e-Taliban – A senior Taliban official was quoted as saying, "We are holding consultations. Once our top leadership gives instruction, then the Tehrik-e-Taliban Pakistan [TTP] will issue a statement about the bomb blast in Islamabad." But he also added, "Taliban too were angered by the onslaught against Jamia Hafsa and Lal Masjid. We cannot forget what happened there."

=== International ===
- Bangladesh – The Foreign Affairs Adviser of the Interim Cabinet Iftekhar Ahmed Chowdhury said "This was a heinous act of cowardice perpetuated by terrorists, and we condemn it in the strongest terms," adding "Terrorism cannot and will not win. Our hearts go out to the families of the victims, and our sympathies to the Pakistani government and people."
- United Nations – Secretary General Ban Ki-moon's spokesperson, Michele Montas said "The Secretary-General urges all political forces to unite against the scourge of terrorism and expresses his heartfelt condolences to the families of the victims and to the Government and people of Pakistan."
- FICA – Federation of International Cricketers' Associations (FICA) chief Tim May was quoted as saying, "FICA is very concerned about the inherent risks of holding such an event in Pakistan in such a landscape of unrest and volatility and opposition to western countries."
