= Inland Revenue Service (Pakistan) =

Domestic taxation service in Pakistan

Inland Revenue Service (IRS)
- خدمات محصول اندرونی (IRS)

Agency overview
- Formed: 2009
- Jurisdiction: Pakistan
- Parent department: Federal Board of Revenue (FBR)
- Website: iris.fbr.gov.pk

The Inland Revenue Service (IRS) is a department of the Federal Board of Revenue (FBR) in Pakistan. It was established in 2009 and holds the responsibility for overseeing various aspects of domestic taxation, encompassing Sales Tax, Income Tax, and Federal Excise Duty.

== Background ==
The IRS was established to manage domestic taxation in Pakistan, which includes the administration of Sales Tax, Income Tax, and Federal Excise Duty. This initiative was a pivotal part of a larger undertaking aimed at enhancing tax administration and boosting revenue collection within the country. The IRS plays a crucial role in the country's fiscal policy by ensuring that taxes are collected efficiently and effectively.

== Role and responsibilities ==
=== IRS Common Pool Fund Rules ===
The FBR had formulated the IRS Common Pool Fund rules, initially scheduled to be implemented from 1 March 2023. However, the enactment of these rules was postponed due to the existing fiscal challenges and the broader economic circumstances in Pakistan.

=== Interaction with the IMF ===
The IRS has been a prominent subject of deliberations between Pakistan and the International Monetary Fund (IMF). The IMF has put forth several tax reform recommendations to the Pakistani government. These recommendations encompassed the removal of sales tax exemptions on fertilizers, pesticides, and tractors, the maintenance of general sales tax (GST) harmonization, and the initiation of reforms in Personal Income Tax (PIT).

== Recent developments ==
=== Staff transfers and postings ===
The IRS has witnessed numerous staff transfers and postings in recent years. In May 2022, the FBR (Federal Board of Revenue) executed the transfer and posting of 24 senior officers within the IRS. Subsequently, in August 2022, 21 senior officials of the IRS were also transferred and posted, and among the changes was the appointment of Malik Amjad Zubair Tiwana as the new Member (IR Operations) of the FBR.

=== Working conditions ===
In 2018, IRS officers expressed apprehensions about their working conditions and raised concerns about perceived elitism within the bureaucracy. They emphasized the substandard working conditions faced by Central Superior Services (CSS) officers and pointed out disparities among various groups, including the Pakistan Administrative Service, Police Service of Pakistan, Customs, Excise and Taxation, as well as Provincial Services.
