= Zahid Husain (banker) =

Governor of State Bank of Pakistan (1893-

1st Governor of the State Bank of Pakistan
- In office June 10, 1948 – July 19, 1953
- Succeeded by: Abdul Qadir

Personal details
- Born: 1893 Karnal, British India
- Died: 14 November 1957 (aged 63–64) Karachi, Pakistan
- Children: Nasir Aslam Zahid (son), former Supreme Court of Pakistan Judge
- Occupation: Banker

Zahid Husain1893 – 1957) was the founder and the first governor of the State Bank of Pakistan from June 1948 to July 1953.

He also served as Pakistan's first High Commissioner to India from August 1947 to April 1948.

He was a close aide of Quaid-e-Azam Muhammad Ali Jinnah, and also the father of Supreme Court of Pakistan Justice (R) Nasir Aslam Zahid.

== Early life ==
Zahid Hussain was born in 1895 in Karnal, now in Haryana, then in British India. He received his education at Government Islamia College, Civil Lines, Lahore and Aligarh Muslim University.

== Career ==
He was the first treasurer of Delhi University. Zahid Hussain then served as the Minister of Finance for the Nizam of Hyderabad in Hyderabad Deccan before the Independence of Pakistan in 1947. Zahid served as vice-chancellor of Aligarh Muslim University, the founding Governor of the State Bank of Pakistan and the first chairman of the Planning Commission of Pakistan besides being the author of Pakistan's first five-year plan.

== Death ==
Zahid Hussain died on 14 November 1957 in Karachi, Pakistan. He was buried in Karachi next to the grave of Shabbir Ahmad Usmani.

== See also ==
- Governor of the State Bank of Pakistan
