= South African cricket team against Pakistan in the UAE in 2013–14 =

Mens cricket tour

Pakistani cricket team vs South Africa in the UAE in 2013
	Pakistan	South Africa
- Dates: 14 October 2013 – 15 November 2013
Captains	Misbah-ul-Haq (Tests & ODIs); Mohammad Hafeez (T20I)	Graeme Smith (Tests); AB de Villiers (ODIs); Faf du Plessis (T20Is)

Test series
- Result: 2-match series drawn 1–1
Most runs	Misbah-ul-Haq (218)	Graeme Smith (281)
Most wickets	Saeed Ajmal (12)	Imran Tahir (8); Dale Steyn (8)
- Player of the series: AB de Villiers (RSA)

One Day International series
- Results: South Africa won the 5-match series 4–1
Most runs	Ahmed Shehzad (193)	AB de Villiers (193)
Most wickets	Saeed Ajmal (11)	Imran Tahir (9); Ryan McLaren (9)
- Player of the series: Ryan McLaren (RSA)

Twenty20 International series
- Results: South Africa won the 2-match series 2–0
Most runs	Umar Akmal (60)	Faf du Plessis (95)
Most wickets	Saeed Ajmal (3)	Dale Steyn (5)
- Player of the series: Faf du Plessis (RSA)

The South Africa and Pakistan national cricket teams toured the United Arab Emirates (UAE) from 14 October to 15 November 2013. The tour, which was a home series for Pakistan, included two Tests, five One Day Internationals (ODIs) and two Twenty20 Internationals (T20I)

== Squads ==
Tests		ODIs		T20Is	
Pakistan	South Africa	Pakistan	South Africa	Pakistan	South Africa
Misbah-ul-Haq (c); Abdur Rehman; Adnan Akmal (wk); Ahmed Shehzad; Asad Shafiq; Azhar Ali; Junaid Khan; Khurram Manzoor; Mohammad Irfan; Rahat Ali; Saeed Ajmal; Shan Masood; Umar Amin; Younus Khan; Zulfiqar Babar	Graeme Smith (c); Hashim Amla; AB de Villiers (wk); Jean-Paul Duminy; Faf du Plessis; Dean Elgar; Imran Tahir; Jacques Kallis; Rory Kleinveldt; Morne Morkel; Alviro Petersen; Robin Peterson; Vernon Philander; Dale Steyn; Thami Tsolekile	Misbah-ul-Haq (c); Abdur Rehman; Ahmed Shehzad; Asad Shafiq; Junaid Khan; Mohammad Hafeez; Mohammad Irfan; Nasir Jamshed; Saeed Ajmal; Sarfraz Ahmed; Shahid Afridi; Sohaib Maqsood; Sohail Tanvir; Umar Akmal; Umar Amin; Wahab Riaz	AB de Villiers (c & wk); Hashim Amla; Jean-Paul Duminy; Quinton de Kock (wk); Faf du Plessis; Imran Tahir; Ryan McLaren; David Miller; Morne Morkel; Wayne Parnell; Robin Peterson; Vernon Philander; Graeme Smith; Dale Steyn; Lonwabo Tsotsobe	Mohammad Hafeez (c); Abdul Razzaq; Abdur Rehman; Ahmed Shehzad; Junaid Khan; Mohammad Irfan; Nasir Jamshed; Saeed Ajmal; Shahid Afridi; Shoaib Malik; Sohaib Maqsood; Sohail Tanvir; Umar Akmal; Umar Amin	Faf du Plessis (c); Hashim Amla; Henry Davids; Quinton de Kock (wk); Jean-Paul Duminy; Imran Tahir; Ryan McLaren; David Miller; Morne Morkel; Wayne Parnell; Aaron Phangiso; Dale Steyn; Lonwabo Tsotsobe; David Wiese

== Tour match ==
=== Pakistan A vs South Africans ===
14–18 October 2013
Scorecard

South Africans	v	Pakistan A
354/8d (98.3 overs); Jacques Kallis 70 (100); Sohaib Maqsood 1/17 (3 overs)		311/6d (100 overs); Ahmed Shehzad 66 (105); Vernon Philander 2/39 (15 overs)
109/3 (31.5 overs); Faf du Plessis 42 (76); Ehsan Adil 1/24 (7 overs)

Match drawn
Sharjah Cricket Association Stadium, Sharjah
Umpires: Ahsan Raza and Shozab Raza (both Pakistan)

- Pakistan A won the toss and elected to field.
- South Africans 1st innings: 1x7 ball over

=== United Arab Emirates vs Pakistanis ===
14–18 October 2013
Scorecard

Pakistanis	v	UAE
317 (86 overs); Younus Khan 103 (160); Rohan Mustafa 2/19 (6 overs)		190 (73.5 overs); Shaiman Anwar 86 (162); Mohammad Irfan 4/28 (13 overs)

Pakistanis won by 127 runs
Sheikh Zayed Stadium, Abu Dhabi
Umpires: Rabi-ul-Haq and Zaheer-ul-Haq (both UAE)

- Pakistanis won the toss and elected to bat.
- Players per side: Pakistanis 10 (12 batting, 10 fielding); United Arab Emirates 14

== Test series ==
=== 1st Test ===
14–18 October 2013
Scorecard

South Africa	v	Pakistan
249 (93.1 overs); Hashim Amla 118 (252); Mohammad Irfan 3/44 (18.2 overs)		442 (138.4 overs); Khurram Manzoor 146 (266); Vernon Philander 3/84 (26 overs)
232 (82.4 overs); AB de Villiers 90 (157); Saeed Ajmal 4/74 (32.5 over)		45/3 (13.5 overs); Misbah-ul-Haq 28* (26); Vernon Philander 2/11 (5 overs)

Pakistan won by 7 wickets
Sheikh Zayed Stadium, Abu Dhabi
Umpires: Paul Reiffel and Rod Tucker (both Australia)
Player of the match: Khurram Manzoor (Pakistan)

- South Africa won the toss and elected to bat.
- Shan Masood and Zulfiqar Babar (both Pakistan) made their Test debut.

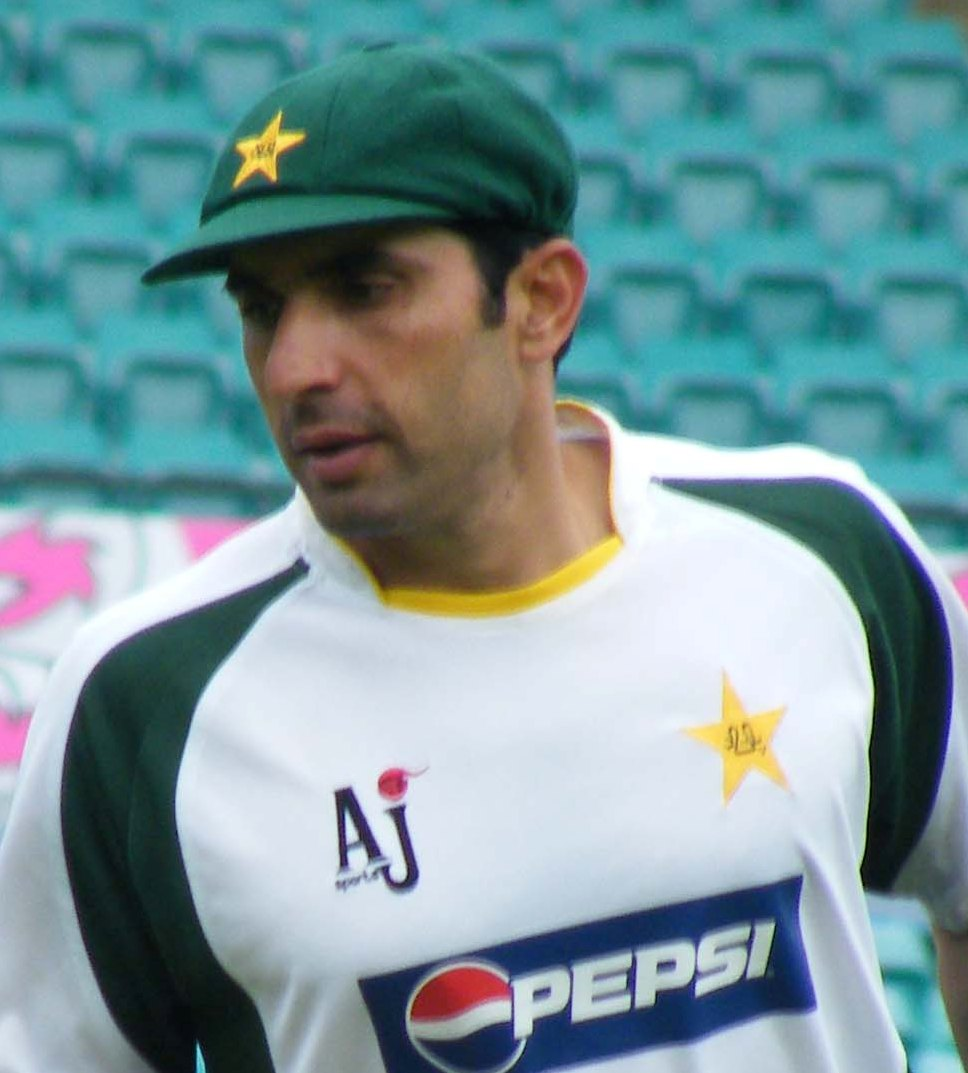
Misbah scored his first Test century against South Africa.

Day 1

South African captain, Graeme Smith, who was playing his first Test after recovery from his ankle injury, won the toss and elected to bat first. Jacques Kallis was also playing his first Test since last February. Hashim Amla's partnerships of 61 runs for the fourth wicket with AB de Villiers (19), and 95 runs for the fifth with Jean-Paul Duminy (57) stopped the Pakistani bowlers who have ruined their top-order, with 43 for three. Zulfiqar Babar and Shan Masood – on his twenty-fourth birthday – made their Test debuts for Pakistan. Zulfiqar, a left arm spinner, was most successful taking three wickets for 89. Amla reached his twentieth century in 201 balls, and at the end of the day, he was unbeaten on 118, with South Africa on 245 for eight wickets.

Day 2

South Africa were restricted to 249 runs in 93.1 overs, and Mohammad Irfan finished with three wickets for 44 runs in 18.2 overs. Younus Khan equaled Javed Miandad's record for Pakistan taking his ninety-third catch in Test cricket; he caught Amla off the bowling of Irfan. Pakistan started their innings with a new opening pair – Khurram Manzoor and Masood – who put on a century partnership of 135 runs. This was the first century-stand from Pakistani openers since January. Masood started his innings with a boundary off Dale Steyn, and scored 75 runs on his debut, before given leg before wicket off Duminy's bowling. At the end of the second day, Manzoor was unbeaten on 131 runs, and Pakistan were 263 runs for three wickets.

Day 3

Manzoor scored 146 runs before falling to Philander; he surpassed Azhar Mahmood's 136 runs and became the highest run-scorer in a Test innings by a Pakistani batsman against South Africa. Misbah-ul-Haq scored 100 runs, his first century since May 2011, and fourth overall in Test cricket. Asad Shafiq added 54 runs, and Pakistan led by 193 in the first innings, scoring 442 runs. Philander took three wickets while conceding 84 runs in 26 overs. At the end of the day, South Africa were 72 for four wickets in 26 overs, with De Villiers on 10 and Steyn on zero.

Day 4

Nightwatchman, Steyn, was dismissed by Babar on seven. De Villiers, who scored his thirty-third half century in Test cricket, was South African second innings' top scorer, with 90 runs. His partnership of 57 runs with Robin Peterson prevented South Africa from an innings defeat; the latter scored 47 runs not out. South Africa took their total to 232 runs in 82.4 overs, this left Pakistan a target of only 40 runs. Saeed Ajmal took four wickets for 74 runs. Pakistan lost their first three wickets for seven runs while chasing the target. They achieved the target in the fourteenth over, with a six hit by Misbah over Peterson. This was Pakistan's fourth consecutive win against a world's no.1 Test team in the UAE; they remained unbeaten for the ninth consecutive time there. South Africa lost for the first time a Test since 2011, after 15 consecutive unbeaten matches. Adnan Akmal and Peterson were fined 50% of their match fee by the International Cricket Council (ICC), due to violation of "Article 2.2.4 of the ICC Code of Conduct for players and player support personnel".

=== 2nd Test ===
23–27 October 2013
Scorecard

Pakistan	v	South Africa
99 (36.4 overs); Zulfiqar Babar 25* (33); Imran Tahir 5/32 (13 overs)		517 (163.1 overs); Graeme Smith 234 (388); Saeed Ajmal 6/151 (55.5 overs)
326 (131.5 overs); Asad Shafiq 130 (320); JP Duminy 3/67 (21.1 overs)

South Africa won by an innings and 92 runs
Dubai International Cricket Stadium, Dubai
Umpires: Ian Gould and Rod Tucker
Player of the match: Graeme Smith (RSA)

- Pakistan won the toss and elected to bat

== ODI series ==
=== 1st ODI ===
30 October 2013 (D/N)
Scorecard

South Africa; 183 (49.5 overs)	v	Pakistan; 182 (46.3 overs)
Wayne Parnell 56 (70); Saeed Ajmal 4/30 (10 overs)		Ahmed Shehzad 58 (92); Wayne Parnell 3/41 (8 overs)

South Africa won by 1 run
Sharjah Cricket Stadium, Sharjah
Umpires: Richard Illingworth (Eng) and Shozab Raza (Pak)
Player of the match: Wayne Parnell (SA)

- South Africa won the toss and elected to bat.

=== 2nd ODI ===
1 November 2013 (D/N)
Scorecard

Pakistan; 209 (49.4 overs)	v	South Africa; 143 (40.4 overs)
Ahmed Shehzad 58 (85); Ryan McLaren 4/34 (10 overs)		Ryan McLaren 29* (43); Shahid Afridi 3/26 (5.4 overs)

Pakistan won by 66 runs
Dubai International Cricket Stadium, Dubai
Umpires: Davis (Aus) and Shozab Raza (Pak)
Player of the match: Shahid Afridi (Pak)

- Pakistan won the toss and elected to bat.

=== 3rd ODI ===
6 November 2013 (D/N)
Scorecard

South Africa; 259/8 (50 overs)	v	Pakistan; 191 (44.3 overs)
JP Duminy 64 (88); Mohammad Irfan 3/46 (10 overs)		Wahab Riaz 33 (47); Imran Tahir 4/53 (10 overs)

South Africa won by 68 runs
Sheikh Zayed Stadium, Abu Dhabi
Umpires: Ahsan Raza (Pak) and Richard Illingworth (Eng)
Player of the match: JP Duminy (SA)

- South Africa won the toss and elected to bat.

=== 4th ODI ===
8 November 2013 (D/N)
Scorecard

South Africa; 266/5 (50 overs)	v	Pakistan; 238 (49.2 overs)
Quinton de Kock 112 (135); Mohammad Hafeez 2/34 (9 overs)		Misbah-ul-Haq 65 (76); Dale Steyn 5/25 (10 overs)

South Africa won by 28 runs
Sheikh Zayed Stadium, Abu Dhabi
Umpires: Ahsan Raza (Pak) and Steve Davis (Aus)
Player of the match: Dale Steyn (SA)

- South Africa won the toss and elected to bat.
- Sohaib Maqsood (Pakistan) made his ODI debut.

=== 5th ODI ===
11 November 2013 (D/N)
Scorecard

South Africa; 268/7 (50 overs)	v	Pakistan; 151 (35.3 overs)
AB de Villiers 115* (102); Saeed Ajmal 3/45 (10 overs)		Sohaib Maqsood 53 (65); Wayne Parnell 3/36 (7 overs)

South Africa won by 117 runs
Sharjah Cricket Stadium, Sharjah
Umpires: Ahsan Raza (Pak) and Richard Illingworth (Eng)
Player of the match: AB de Villiers (SA)

- South Africa won the toss and elected to bat.

== T20I series ==
=== 1st T20I ===
13 November 2013 (D/N)
Scorecard

Pakistan; 98/9 (20 overs)	v	South Africa; 99/1 (14.3 overs)
Umar Akmal 49 (41); Dale Steyn 3/15 (4 overs)		Quinton de Kock 48* (38); Sohail Tanvir 1/21 (2 overs)

South Africa won by 9 wickets
Dubai International Cricket Stadium, Dubai
Umpires: Ahsan Raza (Pak) and Shozab Raza (Pak)
Player of the match: Dale Steyn (SA)

- Pakistan won the toss and elected to bat.

=== 2nd T20I ===
15 November 2013 (D/N)
Scorecard

South Africa; 150/5 (20 overs)	v	Pakistan; 144/9 (20 overs)
Faf du Plessis 58* (48); Saeed Ajmal 3/25 (4 overs)		Sohaib Maqsood 37 (26); Wayne Parnell 3/25 (4 overs)

South Africa won by 6 runs
Dubai International Cricket Stadium, Dubai
Umpires: Ahsan Raza (Pak) and Zameer Haider (Pak)
Player of the match: Faf du Plessis (SA)

- South Africa won the toss and elected to bat.

== Broadcasting rights ==
TV broadcaster(s)	Country	Notes
TEN Sports	Pakistan; Sri Lanka	Official broadcasters
TEN Cricket	Bangladesh; India	
PTV Sports	Pakistan	
SuperSport	South Africa	
