= Economic Affairs Secretary of Pakistan =

Governmental administrative position

Pakistan Secretary of Economic Affairs
- Incumbent; Ahad Cheema
- Reports to: Minister for Economic Affairs
- Seat: Islamabad
- Appointer: Prime Minister of Pakistan
- Website: Economic Affairs Division

The Economic Affairs Secretary of Pakistan , also referred to as Secretary EAD, is the Federal Secretary for the Ministry of Economic Affairs. The position of Secretary EAD is considered to be a lucrative slot in the Federal government. The position holder is a BPS-22 grade officer, usually belonging to the Pakistan Administrative Service. The Secretary heads the EAD, which is the window to deal with external lenders, and plays a key role in assessing and negotiating external economic assistance concerning the Government of Pakistan and its constituent units from foreign governments and multilateral agencies.

Other functions of the Division headed by Secretary EAD includes management of external debt, provision of technical assistance to foreign countries, lending and re-lending of foreign loans, and monitoring of aid utilisation.

== See also ==
- Ministry of Finance (Pakistan)
- Finance Secretary (Pakistan)
- Cabinet Secretary (Pakistan)
- Planning and Development Secretary of Pakistan
- Commerce Secretary of Pakistan
