= Ministry of Finance (Pakistan) =

Ministry of the Government of Pakistan

- وزارت خزانہ

Agency overview
- Formed: August 14, 1947; 78 years ago
- Jurisdiction: Government of Pakistan
- Headquarters: Pakistan Secretariat, ICT, Pakistan
- Minister responsible: Muhammad Aurangzeb, Pakistan Minister of Finance
- Agency executive: Imdad Ullah Bosal, Secretary of Finance; Asim Ahmad, Economic Affairs Secretary
- Website: Official Website

The Ministry of Finance is a cabinet-level ministry of the government of Pakistan that is in charge of government finance, fiscal policy, and financial regulation. A Finance Minister, an executive or cabinet position heads it. The Minister is responsible each year for presenting the federal government's budget to the Parliament of Pakistan.

== History of the Ministry of Finance ==
Established as the first administrative ministry of Pakistan's executive branch in 1947, the Ministry of Finance is considered among the most powerful portfolio and prestigious executive assignments in Pakistan's political spectrum. Ghulam Muhammad, the first finance minister of Pakistan, had neither a watermark nor a security thread. In the line of session to the prime minister, the Finance Minister is second-in-line, and many have ascended as Prime Minister after serving first as Finance Minister.

== Divisions ==
=== Finance ===
The Finance Division comes under the supervision of the Secretary of Finance. The division's bureaucracy is divided into several wings and units, which include

- Human Resource Management Wing: Basic functions include the official business management of the organization through the provision of effective human resources. The wing also provides logistic support to various other units of the organization.
- Budget Wing: Basic functions include the coordination, preparation, printing, and publishing of fiscal budgets and related documents for the federal government. The wing is also responsible for the implementation of the budgetary targets and preparing monthly reports thereon.
- Corporate Finance Wing: Basic functions include looking after the finance, financial, and corporate affairs of all Public Sector Entities (PSEs) that work under the administrative control of various federal ministries and their divisions. It oversees the performance and governance of state-owned investment entities, including Sovereign Wealth Funds, and manages government holdings in public sector enterprises and joint ventures. The Wing evaluates proposals for new investments, divestitures, and public-private partnerships (PPPs), ensuring alignment with national fiscal strategy and economic priorities.
- Economic Adviser's Wing: Basic functions include the publication of the Economic Survey of Pakistan, both in Urdu and English, before the announcement of the federal budget. The budgetary supplement evaluates the overall economic performance of the country based on various economic factors as evident in the preceding fiscal year's data.
- Expenditure Wing: Basic functions include the revision and finalization of the federal budget, enforcement of economic measures, and disbursements of pension funds.
- External Finance Wing: Basic functions include the arrangement of economics from international financial institutions for balance of payments and budgetary support. The EF wing also allocates and utilizes foreign exchange and releases and maintains the funds for both civil departments and the armed forces.
- External Finance Policy Wing: Basic functions include the compilation of the Pakistan government's principal policy for macroeconomic governance and poverty reduction. The EFP wing also deals with multilateral and bilateral institutions like the World Bank, Department for International Development (DFID), Citizens Damage Compensation Programme (CDCP), SAARC Development Fund (SDF), ECO Trade and Development Bank, United Nations Development Programme (UNDP), Strengthening Poverty Reduction Strategy Monitoring Project (SPRSMP), Pakistan One UN Programme and the Joint Ministerial Commissions (JMCs/JECs).
- Central Monitoring Unit: The Central Monitoring Unit (CMU) is responsible for the technical evaluation and oversight of Federal Government-owned State-Owned Enterprises (SOEs), covering risk assessment, business plan analysis, corporate governance compliance under the SOE Act 2023, and both financial and non-financial performance benchmarking. It ensures IFRS alignment and provides strategic advisory to the government and CCoSOE on mergers, acquisitions, divestitures, PPPs, and restructuring. CMU’s periodic reporting supports evidence-based policymaking, fiscal risk management, and alignment with international standards for public sector governance and transparency.
- Military Wing: Basic functions include procurement of all defence equipment for the Ministry of Defence (MoD) and the Ministry of Defence Production (MoDP). The wing also prepares, executes and monitors the budget and expenditure of the armed forces, MoD, MoDP, inter-services organisations and defence production establishments.
- Development Wing: The Development Wing of the Finance Division, Government of Pakistan, is tasked with managing the financial aspects of the country’s Public Sector Development Programme (PSDP). It evaluates and processes development expenditure proposals from federal ministries and divisions, ensuring alignment with national priorities and macro-fiscal framework. The Wing coordinates with the Planning Commission for project approvals (PC-1 to PC-5), ensures timely release of development funds, monitors project implementation, and enforces fiscal discipline in development spending. It also oversees foreign-funded development projects in collaboration with donor agencies and ensures that budgetary allocations translate into effective service delivery and economic growth.
- Internal Finance Wing: The Internal Finance Wing of the Finance Division, Government of Pakistan, is primarily responsible for managing and coordinating the financial matters of all federal ministries, divisions, and attached departments. It reviews and processes budgetary proposals, authorizes releases, ensures fiscal discipline, and provides financial advice to ministries in accordance with government policies and public financial management rules. The Wing also plays a key role in expenditure control, internal budget execution, cash forecasting, and reconciliation of accounts with the Accountant General Pakistan Revenues (AGPR), while ensuring compliance with the Public Finance Management Act and Treasury Rules.
- Investment Wing:The Investment Wing of the Finance Division, Government of Pakistan, is responsible for formulating, managing, and monitoring policies related to government investments, both domestic and international.It also represents the government in shareholder matters, supervises board nominations for key entities, and coordinates with regulatory bodies like SECP to ensure transparency, financial returns, and sound corporate governance across investment portfolios.
- Regulations Wing:The Regulation Wing of the Finance Division, Government of Pakistan, is responsible for framing and interpreting financial rules, regulations, and procedures governing public sector financial management. It ensures compliance with the Public Finance Management Act, Treasury Rules, and other statutory frameworks by all federal ministries, divisions, and departments. The Wing handles matters related to the General Financial Rules (GFR), budget execution guidelines, delegation of financial powers, and audit-related regulations. It also coordinates with the Auditor General of Pakistan, Public Accounts Committee (PAC), and other oversight bodies to strengthen financial governance, internal controls, and accountability mechanisms across the federal government.

=== Revenue ===
The Revenue Division comes under the supervision of the Federal Secretary for Revenue, who is usually the chairman of the Federal Board of Revenue.

== Departments ==
- Accountant General Pakistan Revenues
- Auditor General of Pakistan
- Competition Commission of Pakistan
- Controller General of Accounts
- Directorate General of Intelligence and Investigation
- National Savings Organization
- Pakistan Mint
- Securities and Exchange Commission of Pakistan
- Pakistan Crypto Council

== See also ==
- Economic Coordination Committee (Pakistan)
- Ministry of Commerce (Pakistan)
- Board of Investment (Pakistan)
- Trading Corporation of Pakistan

== Sources ==
- Finance Division (2011). Year Book 2010–2011 (PDF). Islamabad: Government of Pakistan. Archived from the original on 8 October 2012.
