= Federal Board of Revenue =

Division of the Government of Pakistan

- هیئت وفاقی آمدنی

Department overview
- Formed: 1 July 1950; 76 years ago
- Preceding Department: Central Board of Revenue
- Type: Revenue collection
- Jurisdiction: Pakistan
- Headquarters: Islamabad, Pakistan
- Employees: 21,500 (2019)
- Department executive: Rashid Mahmood Langrial, Chairman/Federal Secretary Revenue Division for info & Advice {03427935933}[Umar Draz]
- Website: www.fbr.gov.pk

The Federal Board of Revenue (FBR; Urdu: هیئت وفاقی آمدنی), formerly known as Central Board of Revenue (CBR), is a federal law enforcement agency of Pakistan that investigates tax crimes, suspicious accumulation of wealth, money-laundering make regulation of collection of tax. FBR operates through Inspectors-IR that keep tax evaders under surveillance, assess taxable incomes and perform special tasks for FBR Headquarters. FBR performs role of collection of taxation in the country from all individuals and businesses.

In the fiscal year 2024–25, the FBR collected Rs11.74 trillion in tax revenue, up from Rs9.30 trillion the previous year.

The FBR also collects intelligence on tax evasion and administers tax laws for the Government of Pakistan and acts as the central revenue collection agency of Pakistan.

== History ==
Established as the Central Board of Revenue on 1 April 1924 through enactment of the "Central Board of Revenue Act, 1924". In 1944, the CBR was put under the Revenue Division with the Ministry of Finance until 1960, when on the recommendations of the "Administrative Reorganization Committee", the CBR was made into a division of the Ministry of Finance. In 1974, further changes were made to streamline the organization and its functions. In 1991, the CBR was once again reverted to its original status under the Revenue Division, however in January 1995, the Revenue Division was abolished and the CBR was once again reverted to a division of the Ministry of Finance. In 2007, the "FBR Act" was passed in July 2007, whereby the Central Board of Revenue was renamed to the present-day Federal Board of Revenue and for a third time placed again under the Revenue Division of the Ministry of Finance.

FBR primarily operates through its main collection arms comprising Regional Tax Offices (RTOs) and Large Taxpayer Units (LTUs) across the country.

The FBR's suo motu authority to modify income tax assessments has been limited by the Lahore High Court's (LHC) Rawalpindi bench, which ruled that Section 122(5A) of the Income Tax Ordinance, 2001, cannot be applied to "roving or fishing inquiries" or speculative revenue collection. In the income tax reference Commissioner Inland Revenue versus Sajid Hussain Gondal and others, Justices Mirza Viqas Rauf and Jawad Hassan provided long-needed doctrinal clarity to a provision often invoked by tax authorities by laying out guidelines on the extent and boundaries of amendment powers under Section 122. The reference application, which was submitted in accordance with Section 133 of the ordinance, contested an Appellate Tribunal Inland Revenue (ATIR) ruling that invalidated a change made to a taxpayer's presumed assessment for the 2019 tax year. The FBR's utilization of Section 122(5A) in the case was previously declared illegal by the tribunal.

== Structure ==
=== Wings ===
Pakistan Customs
Inland Revenue Service
Administration
Taxpayers Audit
Legal
FATE
SPR & S
HRM
Information Technology
Accounting
RA&R

=== Directorates ===
Directorate General of Transit Trade - Pakistan Customs
Directorate of Broadening of Tax Base (Special Directorate)
Directorate General of Intelligence & Investigation - Pakistan Customs
Directorate General of Internal Audit - Pakistan Customs
Directorate General of Input Output Coefficient Organization - Pakistan Customs
Directorate General of Reform & Automation - Pakistan Customs
Directorate of Post Clearance Audit - Pakistan Customs
Directorate General of Valuation - Pakistan Customs
Directorate General of Training & Research - Pakistan Customs
Directorate General of Intelligence & Investigation - Inland Revenue
Directorate general of Training and Research - Inland Revenue
Directorate of Withholding Tax - Inland Revenue
Directorate General of Internal Audit - Inland Revenue
Directorate General of Designated Non-Financial Businesses and Professions (DNFBPs)

== List of Chairmen/Chairperson CBR/FBR ==
The FBR Chairman is the executive forerunner of the board and is liable to formulate and enforce the fiscal policies of the country, decide on taxes and duties and ultimately act as a referent to the judicial appeals to the board. The chairman serves an essential job to operate in sync with the economic and trade ministers of the country as well as keep up with the prime minister of the state.

Name of Chairperson	Entered Office	Left Office
Victor Turner	14.08.1947	01.02.1950
Abdul Qadir	01.02.1950	25.02.1952
Mumtaz Hassan	25.02.1952	01.11.1958
H. A. Majid	01.11.1958	29.07.1960
M. Ayub	29.07.1960	19.06.1961
Mumtaz Mirza	19.06.1961	06.03.1963
M. M. Ahmed	06.03.1963	30.05.1966
Ghulam Ishaq Khan	31.05.1966	08.09.1970
A.G.N. Kazi	08.09.1970	10.10.1971
M. Zulfiqar	11.10.1971	17.11.1973
Riaz Ahmad	17.11.1973	30.09.1974
M. Zulfiqar	01.10.1974	12.11.1975
N.M. Qureshi	12.11.1975	14.12.1980
Fazlur Rahman Khan	14.12.1980	11.08.1985
I.A. Imtiazi	11.08.1985	20.08.1988
Syed Aitezazuddin Ahmed	20.08.1988	02.01.1989
Ghulam Yazdani Khan	22.01.1989	11.08.1990
Ahadullah Akmal	16.08.1990	24.07.1991
Sajjad Hasan	24.07.1991	03.10.1991
Alvi Abdul Rahim	13.07.1995	28.08.1996
Shamim Ahmed	28.08.1996	11.11.1996
Hafeezullah Ishaq	11.11.1996	02.01.1998
Moinuddin Khan	02.01.1998	06.11.1998
Mian Iqbal Farid	07.11.1998	06.11.1999
Riaz Hussain Naqvi	08.11.1999	02.07.2001
Riaz Ahmad Malik	03.07.2001	11.03.2004
M. Abdullah Yusuf	12.03.2004	23.07.2008
Sohail Ahmad	18.05.2009	18.03.2010
Salman Siddique	24.12.2010	21.01.2012
Mumtaz Haider Rizvi	21.01.2012	10.07.2012
Ali Arshad Hakeem	10.07.2012	09.04.2013
Ansar Javed	10.04.2013	30-06-2013
Tariq Bajwa (H.I.)	02.07.2013	17.11.2015
Nisar Muhammad Khan	17.11.2015	18.01.2017
Dr. Muhamad Irshad	19.01.2017	30.06.2017
Tariq Mahmood Pasha (H.I.)	04.07.2017	02.07.2018
Ms. Rukhsana Yasmin	02.07.2018	29.08.2018
Mohammad Jehanzeb Khan (H.I.)	29.08.2018	10.05.2019
Shabbar Zaidi	10.05.2019	06.01.2020
Nausheen Javaid Amjad (Acting Chairperson)	06.01.2020	08.04.2020
Nausheen Javaid Amjad	08.04.2020	07.07.2020
Muhammad Javed Ghani	07.07.2020	09.04.2021
Asim Ahmad (S.I.)	09.04.2021	24.08.2021
Dr. Muhammad Ashfaq Ahmad	24.08.2021	27.04.2022
Asim Ahmad (S.I.)	27.04.2022	31.07.2023
Malik Amjed Zubair Tiwana	31.07.2023	08.08.2024
Rashid Mahmood Langrial	08.08.2024	Incumbent
