= Central Superior Services =

Federal civil service of Pakistan

- State Emblem of Pakistan

- Flag of Pakistan
- Type: Civil service
- Abbreviation: CSS
- Formation: 26 September 1973 (current form)

The Central Superior Services (CSS) is the civil service authority of Pakistan under the jurisdiction of the Pakistani federal government. It is responsible for running the bureaucratic operations and government secretariats and directorates of the Cabinet of Pakistan. The Prime Minister is the final authority on all matters regarding the civil service. CSS exam primarily recruits for the All-Pakistan Services.

The civil service defined itself as "key wheels on which the entire engine of the state has to move." Derived from the British Empire of the former Imperial Civil Service, the civil service came into its modern formation immediately after the establishment of Pakistan as a "Civil Service of Pakistan". During its time of formation, the bureaucracy produced Ghulam Ishaq Khan who would go on to become the President of Pakistan. It influenced many of the state's defence, internal, foreign and financial policies. In 1971, it was re-organized and reestablished under "Chapter I: Part-XII, Article 240" of the Constitution of Pakistan which gave it foundation and constitutional status. The civil bureaucracy closely collaborated with the military establishments of Pakistani Armed Forces in issues concerning the national security. The bureaucracy consists of 12 directorates that provide vital office and secretariat related duties to the Government of Pakistan. The provincial bureaucracies are headed by the respective Chief Secretaries of Khyber Pakhtunkhwa, Sindh, Punjab and Balochistan. The highest attainable rank for an officer who serves in the country's bureaucracy is BPS-22 grade.

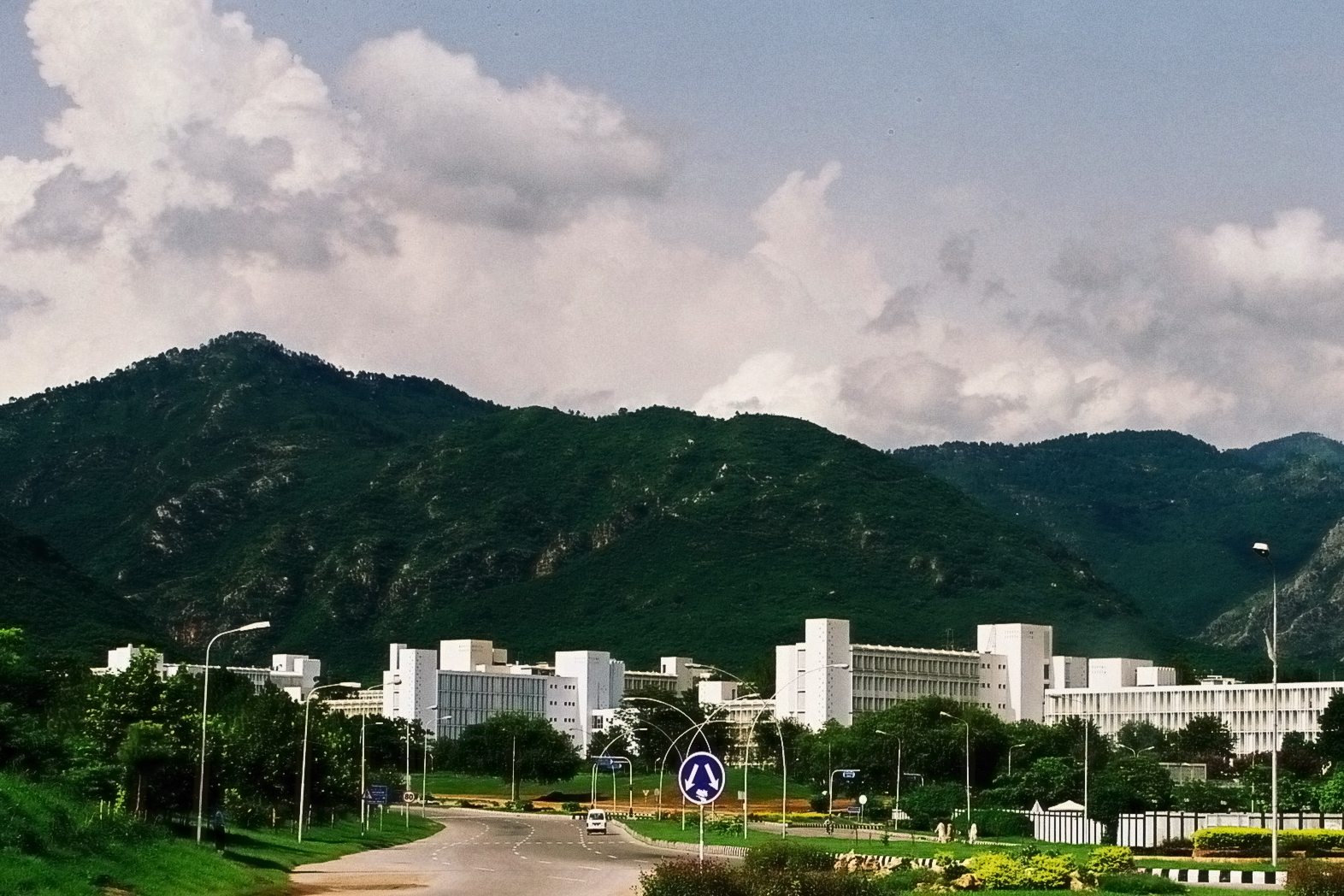
Pakistan Secretariat Buildings, Islamabad

The Civil Service of Pakistan selects only 7.5% of the applicants by merit, education, qualification and experience. In comparison, 92.5% are selected by a quota system. The civil service exams are competitive and provides equal opportunities to males and females, depending on their qualifications. The CSS Examinations are held at the start of every year. The Federal Public Service Commission conducts and supervises the exams. CSS exams have a reputation for a very low pass percentage. In 2020, the passing percentage was only 1.962. In 2021, only 364 (2.11%) of the 17,240 participants cleared the multi-staged exam. In 2022, the passing percentage decreased to 1.85%. In 2025 out of 12,792 candidates who appeared, only 355 passed the written part, 170 got recommended, 86 females and 84 males. Pass percentage stood at 1.32 with respect to recommended candidates and 2.77 with respect to appeared candidates

== Constitutional structure ==
The Constitution of Pakistan lays down separate services for the central government and the provincial governments. Although both types of governments are required to regulate their civil services through "Article 240 of Chapter I of Part XII", in case of the central reservation of the government and by the provisional assembly decrees for officers subjected in the legislative list of the provinces. The idea of civil service was established by the British Empire during the colonial period of the British Indian Empire. It was derived into "Pakistan Civil Service" in 1947 and reorganized and re-established into its modern form in 1973. The Constitution of Pakistan describes the constitutional status as below:

Appointment to service of Pakistan and conditions of service: (a) in the case of the civil services of the Federation, posts in connection with the affairs of the Federation and Civil Services by the Parliament).
(b) in the case of the services of provinces, the posts in connection with the affairs of the Provinces, by an act of the Provincial Assembly.
Existing rules: All rules and orders in force immediately before the commencing day shall, so far as consistent with the provisions of the Constitution.
Public Service Commission: The Parliament in relation to the affairs of the Federation, and the Provincial Assemblies of the Provinces in relation to affairs of the Provinces, may, by law, provide for the establishment and constitution of a Public Service Commission.

— Part XII: Chapter 1: Services and Miscellaneous [Article 240–242], source

== Naming convention ==
The Constitution of Pakistan does not set the legal name for the civil service, and there is no service named "Central Superior Services of Pakistan" (or CSS). The constitution allowed the government-appointed officer and chairman of the Federal Public Service Commission of Pakistan to choose the name. The term "CSS" emerged during the first public examination of the civil service for the appointment on posts at officer entry-level in the occupational groups of All-Pakistan Unified Group (APUG). The Federal Public Service Commission holds the combined competitive exam annually under the title advertised as exam for "Central Superior Services"— the term of colonial days which survived reforms. Similarly, the use of the word "Central" instead of "Federal" as well as the term "Superior" is also the legacy of the past. These were relevant when there was central government under 1956 constitution and classes existed in the civil service. The 1973 constitution abolished all classes in the civil service as the concept of occupational groups was introduced.

== Act ==
Following the foundations laid in the Constitution, the federal government promulgated The Civil Servants Act, 1973 and each province enacted its own Civil Servants Acts. The law allows the civil service of the federation and provinces to be regulated as per rules notified under these enactments. Consequently, both governments have notified Civil Servants (Appointment, Transfer, and Promotion) Rules, 1974. These rules regulate the qualification and method (the way) of filling all posts. The posts at the initial officer level, i.e. BS-17, are classified to be filled by way of promotion or transfer and by direct recruitment under share fixed for each category. The recommendation for appointment in BS-17, under direct recruitment share, is done by the Federal Public Service Commission, established under its law as a requirement of the Constitution. The rest of the posts reserved for departmental officers under promotion quota and posts under appointment by transfer are confined to officers inducted through a lateral entry or for hardship cases coming from the surplus pool. Practically, those appointed on posts in direct appointment quota in each occupational group through the CSS Exam have a natural advantage. They join service at a younger age than departmental officers and reach the highest slots. Since the number of direct officers at the entry-level is few, their quotas in posts in BS-18 to BS-22 are fixed on the higher side; therefore, their promotions are fast-paced. These arrangements make the civil service attractive for talented individuals and instil a sense of superiority and pride. Currently, CSS exams conducted by the Federal Public Service Commission include the following Occupational Groups.

1. Pakistan Customs Services
2. Foreign Service of Pakistan
3. Pakistan Administrative Service
4. Police Service of Pakistan
5. Commerce & Trade Group
6. Inland Revenue Service of Pakistan
7. Pakistan Audit and Accounts Service
8. Information Services of Pakistan
9. Military Lands & Cantonment Group
10. Office Management and Secretariat Group
11. Postal Group
12. Railways (Commercial & Transport) Group

== History of civil services in Pakistan ==
... Civil Service is the backbone of the State. Governments are formed. Governments are defeated; Prime Ministers come and go; Ministers come and go; but you stay on, and therefore, there is a very great responsibility placed on your shoulders ...

— Muhammad Ali Jinnah, Founder of Pakistan, source

Civil Bureaucracy is a colonial legacy in this part of the world. The British used to rule the native population through Indian Civil Service (ICS) and most of the officers in ICS were British themselves. It was in the early 20th century that the Indians also started competing against the British and many Indians eventually made it to the ICS. With the independence of Pakistan in 1947, the term 'Central Superior Services' was used in Pakistan, and the concept of All-Pakistan Services continued. The latter consisted of the Civil Service of Pakistan and the Police Service of Pakistan, whereas the Central Services included the Pakistan Foreign Service and a broad category of Finance and other services. The Finance category included the Pakistan Audit and Accounts Service, Pakistan Railway Accounts Service, Pakistan Military Accounts Service, Pakistan Taxation Service, and the Pakistan Customs and Excise Service. Other central services included the Pakistan Postal Service, Pakistan Military Land and Cantonment Service, Central Secretariat Service, and Central Information Service. Each of these services had its own cadre and composition rules, specifying the total cadre strength in terms of its number of positions.

With the Civil Services Reforms of 1973, a new system of the common training program was introduced and all of these occupational groups (12 at that time) were required to go through a mandatory combined training at Civil Services Academy, Lahore. The batch of officers who attended the Civil Service Academy in 1973 is recognized as "1st Common". Up till 5th Common, the allocation of occupational groups was done after the culmination of the Common Training Program but from 6th Common onwards this task has also been assumed by Federal Public Service Commission. Even to this day, it is an official procedure that once the Probationary Officers successfully complete their common training program then they undergo some further Specialized Training Program (STP) in their own professional academies.

== Pakistan Administrative Service ==
The Pakistan Administrative Service, previously known as the District Management Group before 1 June 2012, is an elite cadre of the Civil Service of Pakistan. The Pakistan Administrative Service over the years has emerged as the most consolidated and developed civil institution, with the senior Pakistan Administrative Service officers of grade 22 often seen as stronger than the government ministers. The service of Pakistan Administrative Service is very versatile in nature and officers are assigned to different departments all across Pakistan during the course of their careers. Almost all of the country's high-profile bureaucratic positions such as the federal secretaries, the provincial chief secretaries and chairmen of top-heavy organizations like the National Highway Authority, Trading Corporation of Pakistan and State Life Insurance Corporation usually belong to the elite Pakistan Administrative Service.

== Armed forces and civil services of Pakistan ==
Commissioned officers of Pakistan Army, Pakistan Air Force and Pakistan Navy have a quota of 10% in all service groups of the Central Superior Services. Still, historically, they have only joined the Pakistan Administrative Service (previously known as the District Management Group), Office Management Group, Foreign Service of Pakistan, and Police Service of Pakistan. Usually officers who join the civil services are of the rank of Captain / Lieutenant / Flight Lieutenant (equivalent to BPS-17 grade). Rank are shortlisted by respective Services Headquarters and selected against this quota after the interview process. The interviews are conducted by a committee headed by the Chairman of the Federal Public Service Commission, the same as in the case of regular candidates. Only the written exam is waived.

== Reform of civil services ==
Even though the Civil Services of Pakistan have been still running on the pattern set out by British Raj (no major change has been performed), the Musharraf government started a major reform process. The task was to be performed by the National Commission of Government Reforms (NCGR) under the chairmanship of Dr. Ishrat Hussain, the former governor of State Bank of Pakistan. The final report published in September 2007 stated that four CSS cadres, i.e., Pakistan Railway Service, Pakistan Postal Service, Commerce and Trade Group, and the Information Service of Pakistan, should be axed. According to the recommendation, the Postal and Railway Service should be made autonomous commercial bodies, and Commerce and Trade and Information Services should be suspended till further notice. The report also highlighted broad changes in the examination system, with the recommendation that a personality test be made part of the selection process.

=== 2016 onwards reforms ===
The civil services reforms have been under consideration, and the Federal Minister for Planning, Development and Reforms Ahsan Iqbal has announced that the upper age limit would be increased to 30 years instead of 28 for taking the Central Superior Services (CSS) examination from 2017 onwards; whereas the increase educational qualification by 14 to 16 years. The CSS Aspirants collected funds from their pocket money. They filed a petition for age relaxation in the Lahore High Court and Peshawar High Court.

On 2 August 2016, the Planning Commission announced plans to restructure the examination process by dividing the Civil Superior Services (CSS) under three cluster programs comprising three categories including General, Finance, and Information by abolishing the existing generalized system. The plan would come into effect from 2018 and would require participants to possess a four-year bachelor's degree in a relevant discipline, for information cluster, a degree in mass communication, journalism or information science will be required, while for finance cluster a degree in economics, finance or related discipline will be required.

On 1 January 2016, the Planning Commission began phasing out the Annual Confidential Report (ACRs) with the key performance indicators (KPIs) to determine the promotions of civil servants.

In 2019, the Prime Minister has constituted an Institutional Reforms cell (IRC) under the Cabinet Division. This cell is working under the chairmanship of Ishrat Hussain. The cell forces Federal Departments to acquire autonomous status, but the departments resist on multiple grounds.

== CSS Examination and statistics ==
The CSS examination is extremely competitive; for every one aspirant selected, there are 200 who are not; in 2015, more than 36000 candidates competed for 158 posts as compared to 2011, when approximately 19,000 candidates participated in the open public examination of the civil service; only 8.0% of them were qualified for 188 government jobs. In 2019, a total of 14,521 candidates appeared in the exam, out of which only 214 (1.47%) were finally recommended by the Federal Public Service Commission for various posts under the federal government.

CSS exams are held every year in the entire country. These are conducted by the Federal Public Service Commission of Pakistan, which also posts successful candidates to various civil service departments.

Only candidates between 21 and 30 years old can apply for CSS Exam. A candidate can appear for a maximum of three attempts. After 2020 FPSC has introduced MPT in order to shortlist the candidates before actual exams. It has been done 2 times till now 2023. The CSS Exam has two major parts: a written test, which takes place in February or March, and a panel interview, which takes place in November. In the first part, the FPSC tests the students in 12 different subjects. Six subjects are compulsory, and 6 are optional. Candidates can choose six subjects of their own choice from many different options. There is a total of 1200 marks.

== See also ==
- Civil Services Academy
- Police Service of Pakistan
- Pakistan Administrative Service
- Federal Secretary
- Establishment Secretary of Pakistan
- Chief Secretary Punjab
- Chief Secretary Sindh
- Chief Secretary Khyber Pakhtunkhwa
- Chief Secretary Balochistan
- Deputy Commissioner
