= Tehmina Durrani =

Pakistani author, artist, and activist (born 1953)

- تہمینہ درانی
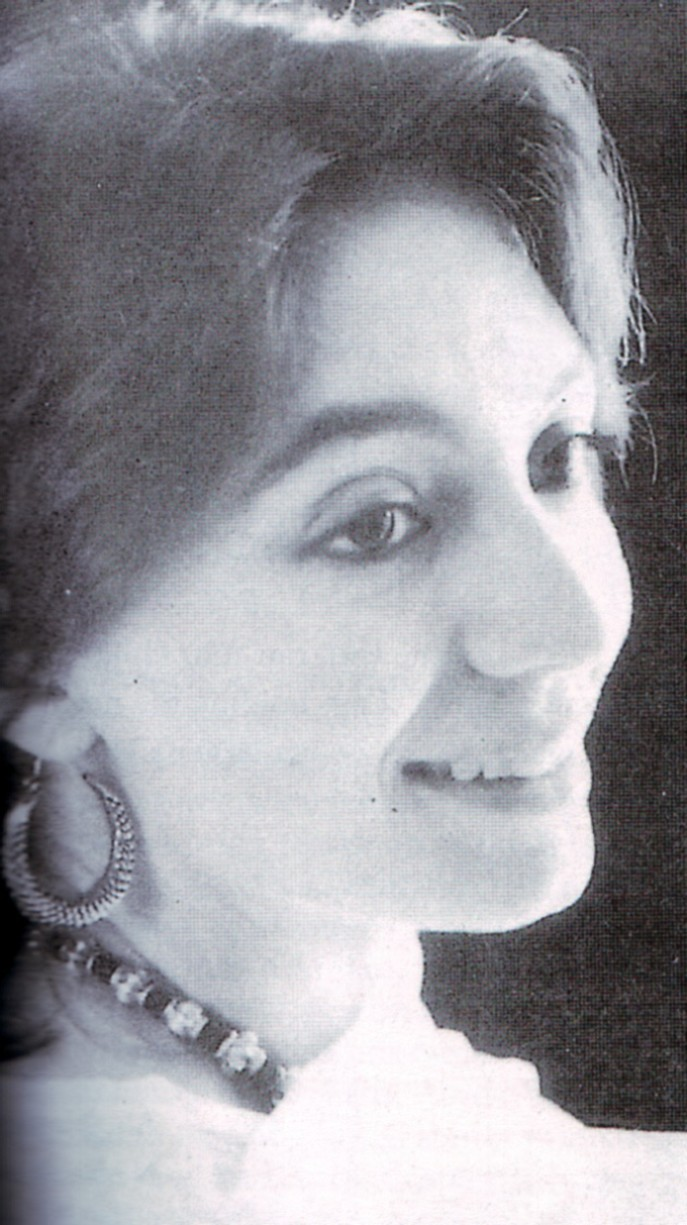
- Durrani in 1994

Spouse of the Prime Minister of Pakistan
- Incumbent
- Assumed role 4 March 2024 Serving with Begum Nusrat
- Prime Minister: Shehbaz Sharif
- In role 10 April 2022 – 13 August 2023 Serving with Begum Nusrat
- Prime Minister: Shehbaz Sharif
- Preceded by: Bushra Bibi

Personal details
- Born: 18 February 1953 (age 73) Karachi, Pakistan
- Spouse(s): Anees Khan (m. 1970; div. 1976) Ghulam Mustafa Khar (m. 1976; div. 1990) Shehbaz Sharif (m. 2003)
- Children: 5
- Parent: Shahkur Ullah Durrani (father)
- Relatives: See Sharif family

Tehmina Durrani (Urdu: تہمینہ درانی; born 18 February 1953) is a Pakistani author known for her bestselling book My Feudal Lord, an artist, a women's and children's rights activist, and a humantarian. She is the spouse of the Prime Minister of Pakistan, Shehbaz Sharif.

== Life ==
Tehmina Durrani, born and raised in Karachi, Pakistan into a mixed paternal Pashtun and maternal Punjabi family, was the daughter of a former Governor of State Bank of Pakistan and managing director of Pakistan International Airlines, Shahkur Ullah Durrani. Tehmina Durrani's paternal grandfather was Major Muhammad Zaman Durrani. Tehmina's mother, Samina Durrani, is the daughter of Nawab Sir Liaqat Hayat Khan, the prime minister of the former princely state of Patiala. Sir Liaqat Hyat Khan's brother, Sir Sikandar Hayat Khan, was a pre-1947 Punjab Premier, a statesman and leader.

At seventeen, she married Anees Khan, and they had one daughter together. Durrani and Khan divorced in 1976. Durrani later married Ghulam Mustafa Khar, a former Chief Minister and Governor of Punjab. Khar had been married five times. Durrani and Khar had four children. After being abused by Khar for several years, she ended her marriage of fourteen years in divorce.

In 1991, Durrani wrote an autobiography titled My Feudal Lord alleging abuse by Khar. She argued in the book that the real power of feudal landlords, like Khar, is derived from the distorted version of Islam that is supported by the silence of women and of society as a whole.

As a reaction to her expository book, her family on both the paternal and maternal sides disowned her and her five children for thirteen years.

In the years after leaving her second husband, Khar, one prominent event was her hunger strike in 1993 against government corruption, and the newly coined term, 'accountability', came into being. After seven days she was admitted to hospital and it was only when the prime minister of Pakistan, Moin Quraishi, visited her to break her fast did she do so.

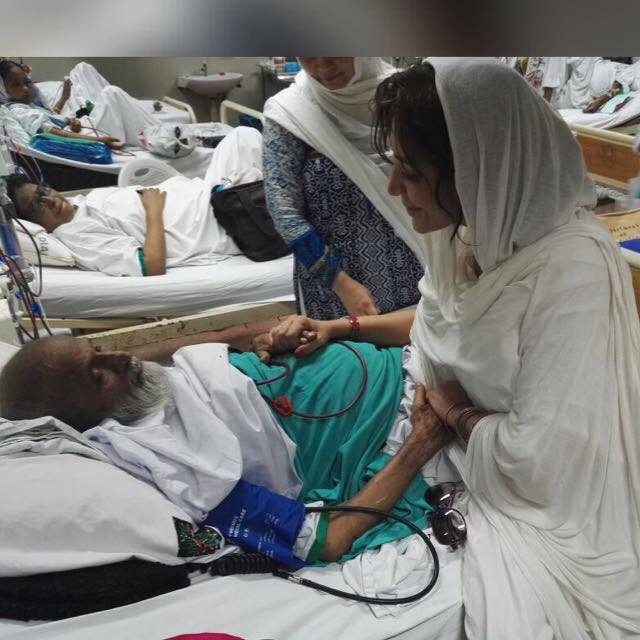
Durrani with Abdul Sattar Edhi in 2016

=== Years with Abdul Sattar Edhi ===
After many years of political exposure through her ex-husband, Mustafa Khar, who was a political leader, and in her struggle against corruption, she realized that the answers she was seeking would not come through politicians. In her search for someone who was in touch with the problems of the common man, and who had found a solution, she found Pakistan's most celebrated humanitarian, Abdul Sattar Edhi.

She moved in with the Edhi family and spent three years serving at Edhi Homes in Mithadar, Sorab Goth, and Kharadar, Karachi. She became his apprentice, and also got his permission to author his autobiography. These years shadowing Edhi sahab were a thesis for the dissertation of the book. These years were perhaps her most transformational as they laid the seeds for her further work as well as her spiritual quest for truth. "While I tied coffins to abandoned babies, stepped over corpses, and drove with him in a ‘peoples’ ambulance, I recorded the thoughts, inspirations, motives, observations, views and works of Pakistan's most revered and renowned social reformer." In 1994, A Mirror to the Blind, Edhi's official ‘narrated’ autobiography, was endorsed and published by the Edhi Foundation.

In 2003, Durrani married thrice-elected Chief Minister of Punjab, Shehbaz Sharif. They were married in a private ceremony in Dubai, United Arab Emirates. Durrani resides in Lahore with her husband, who is Prime Minister of Pakistan and a part of the politically prominent Sharif family, and the brother of Nawaz Sharif, the former Prime Minister of Pakistan.

== My Feudal Lord rights dispute ==
In June 1991, My Feudal Lord was released by Vanguard Books, a company owned by the journalists Najam Sethi and Jugnu Mohsin. Durrani denied she signed a contract vesting complete foreign rights with Mohsin rather than with herself and her estate. The dispute was settled in 1992.

On 19 May 1999, Durrani accused Sethi of stealing her book profits. She said, "[his actions were] an even bigger case of hypocrisy than my experience with the feudal system." At the time, Sethi was being detained without charge by Intelligence Bureau (Pakistan) for his comments to a British Broadcasting Corporation news team about government corruption. Durrani sued Sethi for mental torture, and he countersued for defamation. A review of the book contracts by the English newspaper The Independent described Sethi as acting in good faith and described him and Mohsin as "the injured party".

== Activist - acid attacks on women ==
Since 2005, Durrani has supported the social rehabilitation of women. In 2001, Durrani cared for Fakhra Younus, a former wife of Bilal Khar, the son of Khar from his third marriage. Younus had been attacked with acid, allegedly by her husband. Durrani's arrangements to take Younus abroad captured media attention. Younus was denied a passport to leave Pakistan but under public pressure was later allowed to leave. Durrani engaged the Italian cosmetics firm Sant' Angelica and the government of Italy to treat Younus. Smile Again, an Italian NGO head by Clarice Felli entered Pakistan to assist in the care of mutilated women. Italian mother left Pakistan after falling out with the chapter run by Musarat Misba of Depilex over financial discrepancies. On 17 March 2012, Younus died by suicide in Italy and was buried in Karachi. Durrani received Younus' body draped in an Italian and a Pakistan flag.The funeral prayers for Younus took place at the Edhi centre in Kharadar. The 2012 Sharmeen Obaid-Chinoy and Daniel Junge directed critically acclaimed documentary film Saving Face was made on Younus' life, which won the Academy Award for Best Documentary, among several other accolades.

== Tehmina Durrani Foundation ==
Founded in 2015, Tehmina Durrani Foundation (www.tehminadurranifoundation.org) officially launched its activities in January, 2017. Tehmina Durrani explains, "We are picking the mission of Edhi, where he left. His duty was to serve the humanity without distinction of caste and creed – and so is ours."

The core ideas in its Mission and Vision are:

1. Establishing Pakistan as a Social Welfare State.
2. Teaching the Edhi ideology of humanitarianism, tolerance, and service to others less privileged.
3. Women's empowerment through economic independence.
4. Protection and rehabilitation of the children of war.

== Author - selected works ==
=== My Feudal Lord (1991) ===
Her most famous book, which was an overnight best seller and sensation in Pakistan as well as around the world. It is based on her life. Tehmina Durrani was born into one of Pakistan's most aristocratic families. Her parents married her to Anees Khan when she was seventeen and they had a daughter together. While married, she met Mustafa Khar, an eminent Pakistani politician, who along with Bhutto founded the PPP political party. Tehmina and Khar got married after she divorced, but their honeymoon period turned bitter very quickly. The intense and grotesque abuse is described vividly in her book with gory details. She was brave enough to expose her then famous husband publicly in an extremely conservative Pakistani Muslim society. She paid a heavy price for it because she was shunned by society and her own parents disowned her. Her rebellious nature also cost her losing all financial support from her ex-husband, as well as the custody of her children. It did make her search for answers for the position of women within Islam and made her stand up for women's rights.

As no publisher was willing to take the liability of such a controversial book, she initially printed it herself, and after it became a hot selling book, it was published by Vanguard books. My Feudal Lord has been translated into 40 languages and has received many awards.

=== A Mirror to the Blind (1996) ===
Durrani's second book, A Mirror to the Blind, is the biography of Abdul Sattar Edhi, who was Pakistan's highly decorated social worker. Over a three-year period, Durrani lived in Edhi's home and accompanied him on his visits. The book was published in 1996 by the National Bureau of Publications with the Edhi Foundation. It is the official document Abdul Sattar Edhi's life and message.

=== Blasphemy (1998) ===
Her third book, Blasphemy (1998), was successful but also controversial. In the novel she describes the secret lives of the Muslim clergy and spiritual leaders or pirs. Durrani said that the story is factual, with some names and events altered to protect the identity of the women who are at the center of the story. The book also delves into a critical approach to the tradition and practice of Nikah Halala. She describes several cases resulting in the humiliation and torture of Muslim women. The book also made it into Pakistan's best-seller list.

=== Happy Things in Sorrow Times (2013) ===
Durrani's fourth book "Happy Things in Sorrow Times" (2013) is a novel based on the childhood and youth of an Afghan girl Rabia. The novel was published by Pakistani Publishing group Ferozsons. In contrast to Blasphemy that is based on the issue of domestic violence, Hypocrisy of religious figures in rural Sindh (Pakistan), and distortion of Islamic values, this novel explores the dynamics of Afghan politics in the pre/post 9/11. The setting of the novel is Afghanistan and Pakistan. However, the protagonist of the novel is an Afghan girl. The novel critiques interventions of Russia and America in Afghanistan. This is the first novel where Durrani uses her artwork as well.

== Artist ==
Tehmina Durrani is also a painter. She says she found another way of expressing and conveying her feelings through art, in addition to writing.

Her first exhibit, Catharsis, was held in 1992. One of those paintings became the cover of her third book Blasphemy.

Tehmina Durrani's next exhibit, A Love Affair, took place in 2016. She will be intertwining her writing and painting in her coffee table book by the same name, A Love Affair, with a print version of these paintings along with poems and songs that inspired her paintings.

== See also ==
- Aaminah Haq
- Ghulam Mustafa Khar
