= Bank of Balochistan =

- Company type: Proposed provincial bank (commercial/government hybrid)
- Founded: Approved August 2025; operational plan to be prepared within one week
- Founder: Government of Balochistan
- Headquarters: Quetta (presumed), Pakistan
- Area served: Balochistan province
- Key people: Ashraf Mahmood Wathra, then Governor of State Bank of Pakistan (SBP); Chief Minister Sarfraz Bugti (initiator); Finance Minister Mir Shoaib Nosherwani (oversight)
- Products: Commercial, investment, and development banking (anticipated)
- Parent: Government of Balochistan

Bank of Balochistan is a proposed financial institution of the Government of Balochistan, Pakistan. The bank was first proposed in 2017 by Ashraf Mehmood Wathra, then Governor of State Bank of Pakistan (SBP).

== Overview ==
The Bank of Balochistan was conceived to enhance banking facilities within the province and bolster the commercial banking sector's footprint. The provincial administration has earmarked Rs1 billion from its coffers for the bank's inception. The bank is slated to function as a commercial entity while also serving as a government bank.

On August 27, 2025, Chief Minister Mir Sarfraz Bugti announced Establishment of Bank of Balochistan .
