= Habib Bank =

Habib Bank may refer to:

- Habib Bank Limited, the oldest commercial bank in Pakistan
- Habib Bank AG Zurich, originally founded as a branch of HBL in 1967 and independent since HBL's 1974 nationalization
  - Habib Metropolitan Bank, now known as HabibMetro, Pakistani subsidiary founded in 1992
- Habib Credit and Exchange Bank, now known as Bank Alfalah, founded in 1997
- Bank AL Habib, founded in Pakistan in 1991

== See also ==
- Habib Bank Plaza, headquarters of Habib Bank Limited
- Habib Bank Limited cricket team
