= Economic Advisory Council (Pakistan) =

Economic Advisory Council is a non-constitutional and independent body formed to give economic advice to the Government of Pakistan, specifically the Prime Minister.

== Organizational Structure ==
=== Imran Khan ministry ===
In August 2021, the new government of Prime Minister Imran Khan reconstituted the council with the following members formed by the Prime Minister on Ministry of Finance recommendations for the Finance division under its Implementations and Economic Reforms Unit:

Organizational Structure
Chair	Imran Khan (Prime Minister)
Secretary	Arshad Saeed Jaffar (Secretary of the Economic Advisory Council/Finance Division)
Official Members	Abdul Hafeez Shaikh (Advisor to Prime Minister on Finance and Revenue)
Official Members	Hammad Azhar (Federal Minister for Economic Affairs)
Official Members	Asad Umar (Federal Minister for Planning, Development, Reforms and Special Initiatives)
Official Members	(Secretary of the Finance Division and Economic Advisory Council)
Official Members	Tariq Bajwa (Ex-Governor of the State Bank of Pakistan (SBP))
Official Members	Dr. Ishrat Hussain (Adviser to the Prime Minister on Institutional Reforms)
Official Members	Abdul Razak Dawood (Adviser to the Prime Minister on Commerce and Deputy Chairman of the Planning Commission)
Private Sector Members	Dr. Farrukh Iqbal (Dean & Director, Institute of Business Administration (IBA))
Private Sector Members	Dr. Ashfaque Hasan Khan (Principal and Dean, School of Social Sciences & Humanities, National University of Sciences and Technology (NUST))
Private Sector Members	Dr. Ijaz Nabi (Professor of Economics, Lahore University of Management Sciences)
Private Sector Members	Dr. Asad Zaman (Vice Chancellor of the Pakistan Institute of Development Economics (PIDE))
Private Sector Members	Dr. Abid Qaiyum Suleri (Executive Director, Sustainable Development Policy Institute (SDPI))
Private Sector Members	Syed Salim Raza - former Governor of State Bank of Pakistan
Private Sector Members	Dr Naved Hamid - Professor of Economics at the Lahore School of Economics (LSE)
Private Sector Members	Syed Salim Raza - former Governor of State Bank of Pakistan
Private Sector Members	Sakib Sherani - Economist and Journalist, founder of Macro Economic Insights (Pvt) Ltd

Among the members several retained their positions in Council from previous government, three members of the council belongs to non-economics background, and seven are ex or current office holder members including Asad Umar, on whose recommendations Council is formed.

Council was also criticised for the lack of female representation.

=== Resigned members ===
- Dr Atif Mian - Professor at Julis-Rabinowitz Center for Public Policy and Finance of Woodrow Wilson School at Princeton University.
- Dr Asim Ijaz Khwaja - Sumitomo-FASID Professor of International Finance and Development at the Harvard Kennedy School, Harvard University.
- Dr Imran Rasul - Professor of Economics, Department of Economics, University College, London.

Inclusion of renowned economist Atif Mian resulted in a controversy when former Deputy Speaker of Sindh Assembly Shehla Raza's social media team tweeted a racial and religious tweet against Mian, who belongs to Ahmadiyya faith. However, she later apologized after receiving severe backlash. Previously Khan, himself was under backlash for naming Mian as his cabinet's Finance Minister, but he withdraw Mian's name saying he did not know that he belonged to Ahmadiyya community. Initially, PTI has supported its decision on Mian's inclusion in Council. However after days of biased social media criticism from extremist religious groups, senator Faisal Javed Khan announced on 7 September 2018 in a tweet that, "Atif Mian was asked to step down from the Advisory Council and he has agreed. A replacement would be announced later."

On 7 September 2018, Dr Khwaja resigned from the EAC protesting the government's decision to withdraw the nomination of Dr Mian. On 8 September 2018, Dr Rasul became the second EAC member who resigned in protest over Dr Mian's removal.

== See also ==
- Economic Coordination Committee (Pakistan)
