= Hastilow =

Hastilow is an English surname. Notable individuals with this surname include:

- Alec Hastilow (1895–1975), English cricketer and businessman
- Nigel Hastilow (born 1956), English journalist and author
