= Zainab Abbas =

Pakistani commentator and sports presenter

- زینب عباس
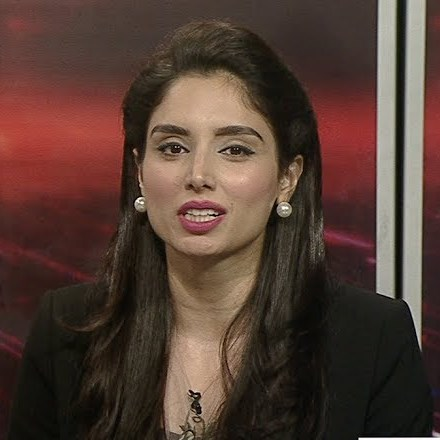
- Zainab Abbas in 2017
- Born: 14 February 1988 (age 38); Lahore, Punjab, Pakistan
- Education: Aston University; University of Warwick (MBA)
- Occupations: Television host; sports presenter; commentator
- Spouse: Hamza Kardar (m. 2019)
- Mother: Andleeb Abbas

Zainab Abbas (Urdu: زینب عباس; born 14 February 1988) is a Pakistani television host, sports presenter, commentator, and former makeup artist.

== Personal life ==
Zainab Abbas was born in Lahore to domestic cricketer Nasir Abbas and politician Andleeb Abbas. She studied at Aston University in Birmingham and then earned an MBA in Marketing and Strategy from the University of Warwick. She then spent two years working for Dolce & Gabbana at Harrods.

Her father played in the Faisalabad and Hafizabad cricket teams as a bowler and went to the same college as Ramiz Raja. On the other hand, her mother is a senior member of the Pakistan Tehreek-e-Insaaf party, elected to the National Assembly of Pakistan on a reserved seat for women from Punjab, and was appointed as the Federal Parliamentary Secretary for Foreign Affairs. She also covered a few cricket events as a journalist, including the 1999 World Cup.

In November 2019, Abbas married Hamza Kardar in Lahore. Hamza is the son of former finance minister and former governor of State Bank of Pakistan, Shahid Hafeez Kardar, himself the son of Abdul Hafeez Kardar, Pakistan cricket team's first captain. She gave birth to her first child in December 2021 and her second child in January 2025. Her younger brother Hussain Abbas Mirza is a fitness trainer, who in February 2023 joined Multan Sultans as their strength and conditioning specialist for the 2023 PSL.

== Career ==
Abbas used to work as a makeup artist with her own studio until 2015, when she successfully auditioned to appear as a guest on a show on Dunya News for the 2015 Cricket World Cup alongside former national team players Saeed Ajmal and Imran Nazir, which launched her career as a cricket presenter and commentator.

She then went to England as a correspondent for Dunya News to cover the Pakistan national cricket team on their 2016 tour. There, she appeared as a guest on BBC's Test Match Special. Upon her return, she earned a full-time contract to present her own show Cricket Dewangi on Dunya News, which she did from 2016 to 2018. During this time, she also wrote sports pieces for Pakistani independent news outlets Dawn and Dunya News.

Abbas has been one of the presenters of the Pakistan Super League from 2016 onwards, as well as for the Abu Dhabi T10. She has also worked with TEN Sports, Star Sports, and Sony for a while.

In late 2017, she hosted a web-series talk show titled Sawal Cricket Ka, which had seven episodes. From May 2018 to May 2019, she hosted 14 episodes of the web-series talk show Voice of Cricket on Cricingif. In both these shows, she interviewed various Pakistani cricketers.

In May 2019, Abbas became the first woman sports reporter and commentator to cover the ICC 2019 World Cup from Pakistan.

In July 2021, Abbas made her debut on Sky Sports as part of the broadcasting team for the inaugural season of The Hundred, thus becoming the first Pakistani female presenter to do so.

== Controversy ==
In 2023, Abbas travelled to India to cover the Men's Cricket World Cup. She had expressed her excitement in being able to travel and explore the country. It was later reported she left the country due to security concerns, after controversy arose following old resurfaced anti-Hindu and anti-India tweets. International Cricket Council stated that she left for personal reasons. Abbas later apologised for the old tweets and stated that "they do not represent my values."

== Recognition ==
In 2019, Abbas was awarded the Sports TV Host of the Year award at the first Pakistan Sports Awards. In July 2020, she was included in the 100 most influential list of people in Asia/UK/EU by the New York Press Agency. In October 2020, she was invited to the TedxLahoreWomen event to give a talk.
