= Sadiq Hussain Qureshi =

Pakistani politician (1927–2000)

Nawab Sadiq Hussain Qureshi

16th Governor of Punjab
- In office 13 March 1974 – 13 March 1975
- President: Fazal Ilahi Chaudhry
- Preceded by: Ghulam Mustafa Khar
- Succeeded by: Ghulam Mustafa Khar

8th Chief Minister of Punjab
- In office 15 July 1975 – 5 July 1977
- Prime Minister: Zulfikar Ali Bhutto
- Preceded by: Hanif Ramay
- Succeeded by: Muhammad Nawaz Sharif

Personal details
- Born: 25 July 1927 Shimla, Punjab, British India
- Died: 24 June 2000 (aged 72) Lahore, Punjab, Pakistan
- Resting place: Multan, Punjab, Pakistan
- Party: Pakistan Peoples Party
- Spouse: Begum Cheena Hussain Qureshi
- Education: Aitchison College, Lahore
- Profession: Politician

Nawab Sadiq Hussain Qureshi (Note: Punjabi/Urdu: نواب صادق حسین قريشی) (25 July 1927 – 24 June 2000) was a Pakistani politician who served as the eighth chief minister of Punjab from 1975 till Zia-ul-Haq's military coup in 1977. He also served as the governor of Punjab from 1974 to 1975. He was a close aide of Zulfikar Ali Bhutto, and retired from all active politics after Bhutto's overthrow in the 1977 coup.

He was born in Simla, British Punjab although his family is native to Multan. Educated at Aitchison College, Lahore, he was forced into responsibility at a young age after his father was killed during the partition. At the time Sadiq Hussain Qureshi was only 20 years old.

He turned his attention to politics in the late 1960s and early 1970s. Starting on the district council level as a vice chairman, he rose through the political ranks, being elected as a Member of Provincial Assembly (MPA), a Member of the National Assembly (MNA) and then being appointed advisor to the Governor. He assumed the post of Agriculture Minister Punjab in 1971. A member of the Pakistan Peoples Party he was chosen by Prime Minister Bhutto as Governor of the Punjab, a post he held from November 1973 to March 1975. He was then elevated to the position of Chief Minister Punjab, where he served until the imposition of Martial law in July 1977.

As well as his political posts, Sadiq Hussain Qureshi also held office as the president of the Pakistan Hockey Federation from 1971– 1976. During his time Pakistan won the first field hockey world cup in Spain (1971), finished runners up to India in the same tournament in Malaysia (1975), claimed a silver medal at the Munich Olympic Games (1972) and a bronze at Montreal (1976).

After the ouster of the Bhutto government in 1977, Sadiq Hussain Qureshi retired from active politics. He owned the Pepsi Cola factory in Lahore until the mid-1980s and after selling that concentrated on his land holdings in Multan. Despite offers during his later years he never held an elected office or participated in active politics again.

He had three sons and a daughter. He died at Lahore in June 2000.

He was a widely respected figure even after his death, especially in his native Multan and the province of Punjab, both of whom he served with great distinction throughout his life.

== Notes ==
Political offices
Preceded by Hanif Ramay	Governor of Punjab; 1974–1975	Succeeded by Ghulam Mustafa Khar
Preceded by Hanif Ramay	Chief Minister of Punjab; 1975–1977	Succeeded by Nawaz Sharif
