= Syed Salim Raza =

British Pakistani banker and financier

15th Governor of the State Bank of Pakistan
- In office February 1, 2009 – February 8, 2010
- Preceded by: Shamshad Akhtar
- Succeeded by: Shahid Hafeez Kardar

Personal details
- Born: 1946 (age 79–80)
- Occupation: Banker

Syed Salim Raza (born February 1946) is a British Pakistani banker and financier who served as the 15th Governor of State Bank of Pakistan. In September 2018, Raza was appointed to the Economic Advisory Council (Pakistan), the Prime Minister's Economic Advisory Council.

== Early life ==
Raza holds a combined BA & MA degree from Oxford University where he studied Politics, Philosophy and Economics at Oriel College.

== Career ==
Raza was the 15th Governor of the State Bank of Pakistan.

In September 2018, Raza was appointed to the Economic Advisory Council (Pakistan), the Prime Minister's Economic Advisory Council.

Raza's current and previous board memberships include: HBL, Telenor Bank, Karandaaz and Planet N Group.

Prior to becoming State Bank Governor, Raza was the Founding CEO of Pakistan Business Council from February 2006.

Raza worked on a variety of associated subjects, both at PBC and SBP, often in partnership with multilateral organizations and Government bodies. His SBP and PBC teams have been instrumental in preparing reports, surveys and recommendations covering subjects including corporate and tax law reforms; infrastructure development; public–private partnerships; capital market structure, corporate debt markets; corporate governance and competitiveness capacity building.

As Central Bank Governor, Raza was instrumental in reforming and improving efficiency within the banking sector while simultaneously advancing the causes of financial inclusion and economic empowerment.

Prior to his helming of the PBC and SBP, Raza was an international financier and banker for 36 years. His business experience covers corporate finance, real estate, private equity, credit and global asset management. Raza was Country and Regional Head for Citibank across various geographies in the Middle East, Asia, Africa, the UK, Central and Eastern Europe. Raza was based in London from 1989 to 2006.

== Family ==
He is the elder son of governor, bureaucrat and diplomat Syed Hashim Raza, and brother of former CEO of National Bank of Pakistan, Syed Ali Raza. The Raza family, originating from Mashhad, are of Persian heritage and are descended from the Nawabs of Pariyawan. Salim is married with three children.

== Citizenship ==
Salim Raza is a citizen of the United Kingdom and Pakistan.

Preceded by Shamshad Akhtar	Governor of State Bank of Pakistan	Succeeded by Shahid Hafiz Kardar
