= Andleeb Abbas =

Pakistani politician

Federal Parliamentary Secretary for Foreign Affairs
- In office 27 September 2018 – 10 April 2022
- Prime Minister: Imran Khan

Member of the National Assembly of Pakistan
- In office 13 August 2018 – 11 August 2023
- Constituency: Reserved seat for women

Personal details
- Born: Lahore, Punjab, Pakistan
- Party: IPP (2023-present)
- Other political affiliations: PTI (2018-2023)
- Spouse: Nasir Abbas
- Children: Zainab Abbas

Andleeb Abbas is a Pakistani politician who has been a member of the National Assembly of Pakistan from August 2018 till January 2023.

== Political career ==
She ran for the seat of the Senate of Pakistan as a candidate of Pakistan Tehreek-e-Insaf (PTI) in the 2018 Pakistani Senate election but was unsuccessful. She received 46 votes and lost the seat to Nuzhat Sadiq.

She was elected to the National Assembly of Pakistan as a candidate of PTI on a reserved seat for women from Punjab in the 2018 Pakistani general election.

On 27 September 2018, Prime Minister Imran Khan appointed her as Federal Parliamentary Secretary for Foreign Affairs.

== Personal life ==
Andleeb's husband Nasir Abbas is a former first-class cricketer who played for Faisalabad and Hafizabad as a bowler. They have a daughter, Zainab Abbas, who is a television sports presenter.
