= Fakhra Younus =

Pakistani dancer and acid attack victim

- Born: 1979; Karachi, Pakistan
- Died: 2012 (aged 32–33); Rome, Italy
- Cause of death: Suicide (jumped from building)
- Occupation: Dancer
- Known for: Victim of an acid attack
- Notable work: Il volto cancellato (The Erased Face) (2005 memoir)
- Spouse: Bilal Khar
- Children: 1

Fakhra Younus (Urdu: فاخرہ یونس; 1979 – 17 March 2012) was a Pakistani woman who was the victim of an acid attack, which severely injured her face. She underwent 39 surgeries during a 10-year period. She committed suicide at age 33.

== Biography ==
Fakhra Younus was born into a poor family in Karachi, Pakistan.She has an older sister and a brother.Her parents divorced when she was very young. Later, her mother became addicted to drugs and began prostitution herself to buy heroin.When Fakhra Younus was 13, her mother arranged for her to marry an older man, and the two did not obtain a marriage certificate. After the marriage, She gave birth to a son for her husband.After giving birth,Fakhra worked as a dancing girl in the red-light district of Napier Road, Karachi.She also had minor roles in two films.When she met her future husband, Bilal Khar, the son of Ghulam Mustafa Khar. The latter is a former Governor and Chief Minister of Pakistan's largest province, Punjab. The two got married after dating for six months.

Bilal and Fakhra were married for three years, with Fakhra eventually leaving him after she claimed physical and verbal abuse.Unable to endure her husband's domestic violence, Fakhra Younus went to live with her mother. Her mother arranged for her to live with her sister. In May 2000, Fakhra was asleep at her sister's house when Bilal and another man broke into her home. In front of her 5 years old son, Bilal threw sulfuric acid at her.Her nose completely melted, her hair burned off, fused lips, blinding one of her eye, destroying one ear and melting her breasts.

Pakistani writer and activist Tehmina Durrani wrote:

“I have met many acid victims. Never have I seen one as completely disfigured as Fakhra. She had not just become faceless; her body had also melted to the bone. Despite her stark and hopeless condition, the government of the Islamic Republic of Pakistan was not in the least God-fearing. She was provided nothing ... but disdain ... and trashed. ... Fakhra died again to remind the world that she had lived”.

Khar claimed that the attacker was someone else with his name. He was acquitted of all charges in the incident. Fakhra was sent to Rome, Italy, for treatment by Tehmina Durrani, Bilal's stepmother. Initially she was denied a visa, but under public pressure, she was allowed to leave for Italy. Durrani engaged the Italian cosmetic firm Saint Angelic and Italian government to treat her. Smile Again, an Italian NGO headed by Clarice Felli entered Pakistan to assist in the care of mutilated women.Fakhra underwent approximately 40 facial reconstruction surgeries.In 2005,Fakhra published a memoir, Il volto cancellato (The Erased Face).

In March 2012, Fakhra committed suicide by jumping from the sixth floor of a building in Rome, Italy. Her body was brought back to Pakistan by Durrani, and was wrapped in an Italian and Pakistani flag. The funeral prayer of Fakhra was held at Edhi home in Kharadar. She is buried at Karachi, Pakistan, in the Defence area.

== Legacy ==
Her attack, trial, and suicide received international attention, and highlighted the plight of acid attacks victims in Pakistan. There were 1,375 acid attacks in the country between 2007 and 2016; or some 153 per year; however only 56% are actually female victims or 85 per year. She was featured in a critically acclaimed documentary film about acid attacks, Saving Face (2012), which was awarded the nation's first Oscar less than a month prior to her suicide. As a result of the awareness she helped raise, acid attacks have continuously fallen.

"In 2016 and 2017, there were a total of 71 victims of acid attacks, whereas between 2018 and 2019, there were 62 cases related to acid throwing". Additionally protections have been brought in for women including the very latest Acid and Burn Crime Bill (2017), which "offers free medical treatment and rehabilitation for acid burn victims, who often face lifelong physical and psychological disabilities". The film directly helped in such legislation being brought forward and passed by the parliament.
