= Imtiaz Alam Hanfi =

Pakistani banker

10th Governor of the State Bank of Pakistan
- In office 17 August 1988 – 2 September 1989
- Preceded by: Vasim Aon Jafarey
- Succeeded by: Kassim Parekh
- In office 1 September 1990 – 30 June 1993
- Preceded by: Kassim Parekh
- Succeeded by: Muhammad Yaqub

Personal details
- Occupation: Civil servant

Muhammad Imtiaz Alam Hanfi (6 January 1929 – 22 April 2015) was a Pakistani civil servant who served as the governor of the State Bank of Pakistan (SBP) and has been part of various government committees, including the Planning Commission. He was the first central bank governor in the country who came from within the State Bank of Pakistan and not belonging to a political party or international bodies like IMF etc.

== Education ==
Born in Allahabad, British India, in 1929 in the village area of Pargana Chail. Hanfi got his schooling at the CAV High School and completed intermediate school education at the Union Christian College. Hanfi suffered severe bronchitis and asthmatic problems in his childhood and doctors advised his parent to keep him away from studies or sports; which is why he started formal education from grade 5. Following the independence of Pakistan in 1947, at the age of 18, Hanfi and his family left Allahabad and moved to Karachi, Pakistan where his father entered the civil service. Hanfi enrolled in Islamia College and went on to complete a master's degree in economics at the University of Karachi in 1952, with a First Class position.

During his higher education, his family was based in Hyderabad, where his father was an officer in Pakistan Railways.

== State Bank of Pakistan career ==
Hanfi always wanted to join the Civil Service; however, on the insistence of his roommate, he applied for an opening as an SBP Class I Officer. He was posted at Lloyd's Bank in Karachi as an SBP trainee in 1952. In the post-training exams, he stood at the top of the batch nationally. However, he was still obsessed with following his father into the civil service and Hanfi had no plans to pursue a career at the SBP.

Hanfi was sent to World Bank training course (6 months) where representatives from 130 countries were also attending. It was unusual for a young officer (aged 27) to be sent for such a course when only senior officer used to be sent abroad with political or other links. Hanfi surprised the SBP top management when he took the first position among all 130 participants in the training course, which involved managing various World Bank tasks for different countries in a simulated environment. He was given a hero's welcome by the SBP management on his return.

He would spend more than forty years at the central bank, with one brief stint as the chief executive of PICIC between 1981 and 1984. In 1984, he was recalled as deputy governor and eventually went on to be appointed as Governor of the State Bank in 1988. He is also the only governor who has been appointed twice on the post; as Qasim Parekh was appointed as Governor State Bank when Hanfi resigned from the post, subsequent to his long-standing non-agreement with PPP government on policy issues.

== Policy highlights ==
Hanfi started the financial sector reforms in 1987. He introduced a system of treasury bills auctions and foreign exchange reforms, including the relaxation and dismantling of controls; however, the most important was the handling of the BCCI crisis and privatization of the financial sector.

Hanfi faced pressure from international liquidators as well as Ministry of Finance (on international pressure) regarding the BCCI crisis, but Pakistan became the only country where depositors at BCCI were fully repaid. Hanfi was adamant that BCCI Pakistan was locally incorporated and as per the Articles any assets of the bank would be handed over to international liquidator only if the local bank is facing bankruptcy and all local depositors have been paid off.

Hanfi also participated heavily in bank reforms. Banks had originally had credit ceilings, a practice not in line with a market-based financial system, and Hanfi did away with them and brought capital adequacy in line with international requirements.

== Fall out with government ==
Hanfi since was not affiliated to any political party and had a very clean past; thus had no weak points and thus the political government of PPP and PMLN found it very difficult to get things done their way when it came to monetary policy. It was reported by famous journalist Shaheen Sahbai that Governor Sindh Jam Sadiq Ali openly told people that he would get Hanfi's family kidnapped as he was not approving the establishment of Mehran Bank. Later on, his son, Hamid, was actually kidnapped and returned home after 34 days. In this time Hanfi resigned from his post however his resignation was rejected by then the President of Pakistan, Ghulam Ishaq Khan. Ghulam Ishaq Khan had worked with Hanfi during his days as Governor of State Bank.

== Personal life ==
Hanfi has 4 children with his wife Razia; namely Zahida, Hamid, Farhi and Hena. He also had 4 brothers. Hanfi always avoided evening parties be it official or non-official; nor did he socialize with any politicians and civil bureaucracy. He didn't even move to the Governor Residence (a lavish British style mansion next to British Council, Karachi) and stayed in his private house that he built in 1966. He died on 22 April 2015, at his residence.
