= Ghulam Mustafa Khar =

Pakistani politician (born 1937)

Malik Ghulam Mustafa
- غلام مصطفى کھر

15th & 17th Governor of Punjab
- In office 10 March 1975 – 15 July 1975
- President: Fazal Ilahi Chaudhry
- Preceded by: Sadiq Hussain Qureshi
- Succeeded by: Mohammad Abbas Abbasi
- In office 23 December 1971 – 12 November 1973
- President: Zulfikar Ali Bhutto; Fazal Ilahi Chaudhry
- Preceded by: Attiqur Rahman
- Succeeded by: Sadiq Hussain Qureshi

6th Chief Minister of Punjab
- In office 12 November 1973 – 15 March 1974
- Prime Minister: Zulfikar Ali Bhutto
- Governor: Sadiq Hussain Qureshi
- Preceded by: Malik Meraj Khalid
- Succeeded by: Hanif Ramay

Personal details
- Born: 2 August 1937 (age 89) Sanawan, Punjab, British India
- Party: Pakistan Muslim League (N) (2022–present)
- Other political affiliations: Pakistan Tehreek-e-Insaf (2017–2022); Pakistan Muslim League (F) (2012–2017); Pakistan Muslim League (N) (2008–2012); Pakistan Muslim League Q (2002–2008); Pakistan Muslim League (N) (1997–2002); Pakistan Peoples Party (1988–1997); National Peoples Party (1977–1988); Pakistan Peoples Party (1969–1977); Pakistan Muslim League (1962–1969)
- Spouse(s): Wazeer Begum (m. 1957; div. 1967) Firdous Batool (m. 1963; div. 1968) Safia Bano (m. 1967; div. 1970) Naubahar Zaib (m. 1971; div. 1973) Sheherzad Pirzada (m. 1973; div. 1976) Tehmina Durrani (m. 1976; div. 1990) Ayesha Butt (m. 1990) Ayonia Mumtaz Marral (m. 2002)
- Children: Bilal Khar; Aamina Haq (daughter)
- Relatives: Malik Ghulam Arbi Khar (brother); Ghulam Rabbani Khar (brother); Safina Saima Khar (sister-in-law); Raza Rabbani Khar (nephew); Hina Rabbani Khar (niece)
- Education: Aitchison College

Malik Ghulam Mustafa Khar (Note: Urdu: غلام مصطفى کھر) (born 2 August 1937) is a Pakistani politician and feudal lord who served as the sixth chief minister of Punjab from 1973 to 1974, and as the 15th and 17th governor of Punjab from 1971 to 1973 and in 1975.

== Early life and education ==
He was born on 2 August 1937 in Sanawan in Kot Addu, Punjab to a wealthy landowning family belonging to the Khar clan, of the larger Kharal tribe. From his maternal side, he is a descendant of Khawaja Suleman Taunsvi of Taunsa Sharif.

He received his education from Aitchison College, Lahore.

== Political career ==
Ghulam Mustafa Khar won his first National Assembly election in 1962 at the age of 24. He remained on posts of Minister of Water and Power, Chief Minister and Governor. In 1967, Khar joined Zulfikar Ali Bhutto as one of the founding members of the Pakistan Peoples Party as a close personal friend and political ally. He was appointed Governor and Martial Law Administrator of Punjab, the most electorally powerful province in the country by the newly sworn in President Bhutto following the collapse of Yahya Khan's military government. When the 1973 constitution was adopted in August and Bhutto became Prime Minister of Pakistan, Khar was given the portfolio of Chief Minister of Punjab Province.

Thanks to complaints from within the PPP, Khar was replaced by the far more left-leaning and intellectual Hanif Ramay. Khar was briefly reappointed Governor in March 1975 before being finally dismissed in July 1975. Bhutto's suspicions over Khar's ambitions as well as the deep divisions within the PPP in the Punjab led to his refusal to allow Khar to run for Ramay's seat in Lahore. Khar's attempts to run for the seat as an independent ended in failure. By 1976, former rivals within the PPP, Khar and Ramay were working together within the Pir of Pagaro's Pakistan Muslim League (F). However, his relations with Prime Minister Zulfikar Ali Bhutto briefly improved as he was appointed Special Assistant to the Prime Minister in 1977.

In April 2017, he joined Pakistan Tehreek-e-Insaf (PTI) and he is considered to be on the left wing of the PTI. He quit the PTI in 2022 and went back to the PML-N.

== Personal life ==
Khar has been married eight times and six of the marriages have ended in divorce. One of Khar's former wives is Tehmina Durrani, a Pakistani women's rights activist and author. Her first book, My Feudal Lord, released by Vanguard Books of Lahore in June 1991, described her abusive and traumatic marriage to Ghulam Mustafa Khar.

His daughter Aaminah Haq is a Pakistani model and actress noted as a Lux model and for her role in the television drama Mehndi.

Hina Rabbani Khar, the former Minister of Foreign Affairs, is the daughter of his brother Ghulam Noor Rabbani.

His son, Bilal Mustafa Khar was accused by Bilal's former wife Fakhra Younus of pouring acid over her face. Later, his son was acquitted of the charges. Four witnesses who testified to seeing his son enter Fakhra's home on the day of the attack complained of receiving death threats; they later retracted their statements due to the seriousness of the threats. In December 2003, a judge dismissed the charges. Khar continued to protest his son's innocence, claiming the perpetrator was a pimp with whom Bilal's wife had been having an affair.

== Writings ==
=== Books ===
- Zulfiqar Ali Bhutto ki Kahani, 1975, 156 p.
- Khari Baten, 1987, 152 p.

=== Book chapter ===
“Pakistan’s role in Muslim world” in the book Re-emerging Muslim World edited by Zahid Malik, published by Pakistan National Centre in 1974.

== See also ==
- Hina Rabbani Khar
- Ghulam Noor Rabbani
- Tehmina Durrani
- Aaminah Haq
- Fakhra Younus

== Notes ==
Political offices
Preceded by Attiqur Rahman	Governor of Punjab; 23 Dec 1971 – 12 Nov 1973	Succeeded by Sadiq Hussain Qureshi
Preceded by Sadiq Hussain Qureshi	Governor of Punjab; 14 Mar 1973 – 31 Jul 1973	Succeeded by Mohammad Abbas Abbasi
Preceded by Malik Meraj Khalid	Chief Minister of Punjab; 12 Nov 1973 – 15 Mar 1974	Succeeded by Hanif Ramay
