= Shahid Hafeez Kardar =

Pakistani economist

16th Governor of the State Bank of Pakistan
- In office September 8, 2010 – July 13, 2011
- Preceded by: Salim Raza
- Succeeded by: Yaseen Anwar

Personal details
- Born: 1952 (age 73–74)
- Parent: Abdul Hafeez Kardar (father)
- Occupation: Economist

Shahid Hafeez Kardar (born 1952) is a Pakistani economist and former provincial finance minister. He served as the 16th Governor of the State Bank of Pakistan from September 2010 to July 2011.

He was the acting Punjab Minister for Finance, Planning & Development, Excise and Taxation and Industries & Minerals Development from November 1999 to January 2001. Previously, he served as the Vice-Chancellor of Beaconhouse National University in Lahore.

== Early life and education ==
Kardar is the son of former Pakistani Test cricket captain Abdul Hafeez Kardar and belongs to an Arain family of Lahore. He holds an accounting qualification from England and is a graduate of the University of Oxford. His son, Hamza, is married to cricket commentator and sports presenter Zainab Abbas.

== Bibliography ==
- Reflections on Pakistan's Economy
- The Political Economy of Pakistan
- Polarization in the Regions: The Roots of Discontent
