= Muhammad Yaqub =

Pakistani economist

12th Governor of the State Bank of Pakistan
- In office 25 July 1993 – 5 November 1999
- Preceded by: Imtiaz Alam Hanfi
- Succeeded by: Ishrat Husain

Personal details
- Born: 10 May 1937 (age 89)
- Occupation: Economist

Muhammad Yaqub (born 10 May 1937) is a Pakistani economist who served as the 12th Governor of the State Bank of Pakistan from 1993 to 1999.

== Early life and education ==
Muhammad Yaqub was born on 10 May 1937. He earned his B.A. from the University of the Punjab in 1957, an M.A. in economics from the same university in 1959, a second M.A. from Yale University in 1965, and a Ph.D. in economics from Princeton University in 1966.

== Career ==
Yaqub began his career at the State Bank of Pakistan in 1960 as a research officer in the Research Department and was promoted to director in 1975. He joined the International Monetary Fund (IMF) in 1972 and served there until he left in 1992 to serve as the Special Secretary and principal economic adviser in the Ministry of Finance of the Government of Pakistan. He resigned from his position as Governor on 5 November 1999, to become a member of the National Security Council.
