= Kassim Parekh =

11th Governor of the State Bank of Pakistan

11th Governor of the State Bank of Pakistan
- In office September 5, 1989 – August 30, 1990
- Preceded by: Imtiaz Alam Hanfi
- Succeeded by: Imtiaz Alam Hanfi

Personal details
- Born: 31 January 1931 Bantva, Gujarat, British India
- Died: 11 February 2017 (aged 86) Karachi, Pakistan
- Children: 4
- Occupation: Banker

Kassim Parekh (Urdu: قاسم پاریکھ) (31 January 1931 – 11 February 2017) was a Pakistani banker who served as the 11th Governor of the State Bank of Pakistan from September 1989 to August 1990. Previously, he served as the president of Habib Bank Limited.

== Early life and education ==
Parekh was born in Bantva, Gujarat, British India. He completed his early education in his village and Rajkot, followed by matriculation in Bombay. In 1947, he migrated to Karachi, Pakistan, initially residing in a rented house on M. A. Jinnah Road.

== Career ==
Parekh began his banking career at Habib Bank Limited in 1949 at 18, and rose to become the bank president by 1988. From September 1989 to August 1990, he served as the 11th Governor of the State Bank of Pakistan. Later, he worked for HabibMetro until he died in 2017.
