= Syed Ali Raza =

Pakistani banker

- Born: 1950 (age 75–76)
- Education: London School of Economics; Cass Business School; Institute of Business Administration, Karachi
- Occupation: Banker
- Parent: Syed Hashim Raza (father)
- Relatives: Syed Salim Raza (brother)
- Awards: Sitara-e-Imtiaz (2006)

Syed Ali Raza (born March 1950) is a Pakistani banker who served as the president of the National Bank of Pakistan (NBP) from July 2000 until January 2011. Before joining NBP, he spent a large part of his career with Bank of America and left the position of senior vice president and regional head for the Middle East, North Africa and Pakistan, to join NBP. In 2005, Businessweek included him in its annual list of the "25 Stars of Asia", recognising him among the region's leading financiers, and he was awarded the Sitara-e-Imtiaz by the President of Pakistan in 2006.

== Early life and education ==
Raza is the younger son of the Pakistani bureaucrat and diplomat Syed Hashim Raza, an Indian Civil Service officer who opted for Pakistan at independence and went on to serve as the first administrator of Karachi and briefly as acting Governor of East Pakistan. His elder brother, Syed Salim Raza, served as the 15th Governor of the State Bank of Pakistan from 2009 to 2010. The Raza family traces its origins to Mashhad in Iran and is descended from the Nawabs of Pariyawan.

Raza graduated with a Bachelor of Science in economics from the London School of Economics and later obtained a Master of Science in administrative sciences from Cass Business School in London. He also holds a graduate degree from the Institute of Business Administration, Karachi.

== Career ==
=== Bank of America ===
Before returning to Pakistan, Raza spent 26 years with Bank of America, serving in a series of international postings. He was serving as senior vice president and regional head of Bank of America's operations for the Middle East, North Africa and Pakistan when he left the bank in 2000.

=== National Bank of Pakistan ===
Raza was appointed president of the National Bank of Pakistan on 1 July 2000 for an initial three-year term, under Section 11(3)(a) of the Banking Nationalization Act of 1974. He was subsequently reappointed by the federal government for two further three-year terms in consultation with the State Bank of Pakistan.

During his tenure, Raza restructured the bank's workforce and branch network, eliminated more than 3,000 jobs and closed some 250 branches. In 2005, Bloomberg Businessweek named him among its "25 Stars of Asia" as one of the region's leading financiers.

Raza was removed from the presidency in January 2011 after the Supreme Court of Pakistan held that his appointment to a fifth consecutive term was unconstitutional; his last day in office was 14 January 2011. He continued on the bank's board as chairman until 7 March 2012, when the Government of Pakistan accepted his resignation.

== Trials, arrest, and pardon ==
In September 2017, the National Accountability Bureau (NAB) arrested Raza in Karachi after the Sindh High Court cancelled his pre-arrest bail in a corruption reference concerning the alleged misappropriation of roughly Rs. 18 billion (US$185 million) at NBP's Dhaka branch between 2003 and 2012. NAB alleged that Raza and sixteen co-accused, several of them Bangladeshi nationals, had misused their authority to grant and revise financing facilities at the branch, causing substantial losses to the national exchequer.

In a separate case pursued from 2016 onward, Raza and other senior officials were tried over the alleged misappropriation of about Rs. 2 billion in NBP staff welfare funds between 2003 and 2008. In proceedings before an accountability court in 2020, a NAB prosecutor told the court that Raza had initially been named as an accused in a related reference but was subsequently granted a pardon and made an approver.

== Awards and recognition ==
Raza was awarded the Sitara-e-Imtiaz, one of Pakistan's civilian honours, by the President of Pakistan in March 2006. In its 2005 "25 Stars of Asia" feature, BusinessWeek named him alongside the region's leading business figures.
