= Syed Hashim Raza =

Pakistani politician

SQA SP Syed Hashim Raza

Governor of East Pakistan
- In office 1 July 1961 – 5 August 1961

Personal details
- Born: 16 February 1910 Unnao, United Provinces of Agra and Oudh, British India
- Died: 30 September 2003 Karachi, Pakistan
- Party: All-India Muslim League
- Children: 4 including Syed Ali Raza and Syed Salim Raza
- Awards: Sitara-e-Pakistan; Sitara-e-Quaid-i-Azam

Syed Hashim Raza was a Pakistani civil servant who served as a Governor of East Pakistan.

== Early life and education ==
He was born on 16 February 1910 at Unnao in United Provinces of Agra and Oudh, British India into a prominent family of Mashhadi Persian origin.

In 1932, he graduated from Lucknow University with a Master of Arts degree in political science. Then he went on to University of Oxford, England for further studies.

== Career ==
In 1934, he joined the Indian civil service in British India. From 1934 to 1939, he was an assistant collector and magistrate. He served as deputy commissioner in Larkana and Tharparkar districts from 1943 to 1946. From 1946 to 1947, he served as the deputy secretary of Home and General Departments. Syed Hashim Raza held numerous positions including provincial press adviser and secretary to the Governor of Sindh.

From 1948 to 1951, he was the first administrator of the then federal capital of Pakistan, Karachi. In fact, he was serving in this administrator's position when the founder of Pakistan Muhammad Ali Jinnah died on 11 September 1948 in Karachi. He was one of the close associates of Jinnah. From 1951 to 1953, he served in various capacities in the Sindh administration. From 1 July 1961 to 5 August 1961, he was the acting Governor of East Pakistan.

== Awards and recognition ==
- Sitara-I-Pakistan (Star of Pakistan) Award for his distinguished services to Pakistan
- Sitara-e-Quaid-e-Azam (Star of Quaid-e-Azam) Award by the Government of Pakistan

== Death and legacy ==
He died on 30 September 2003 in Karachi, Pakistan at age 93 due to kidney failure after a long illness. He was married to Salma Raza. He had two daughters and two sons, Syed Ali Raza, former president of National Bank of Pakistan, and Syed Salim Raza, former Governor of State Bank of Pakistan.
