= Yaseen Anwar =

Pakistani-American banker

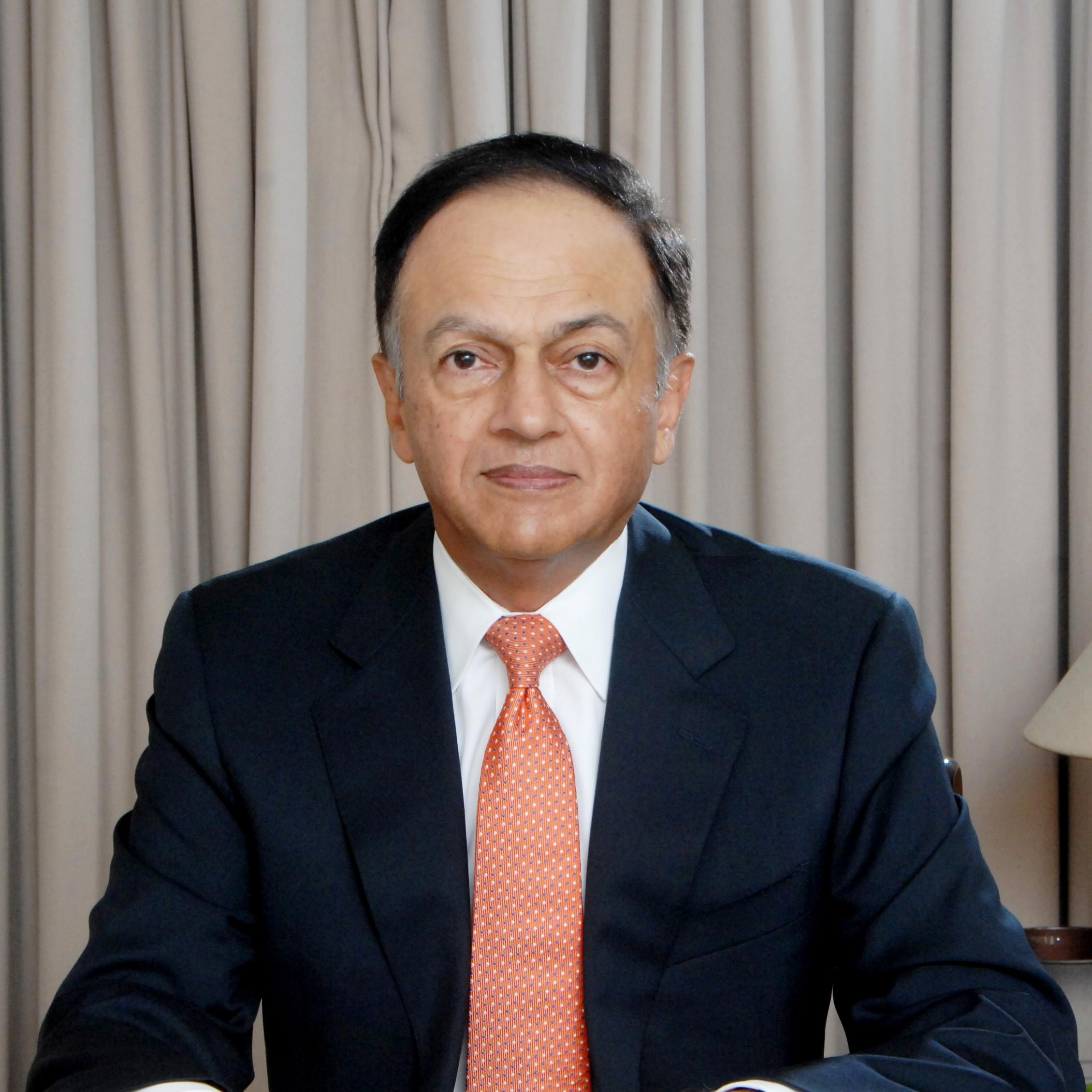

17th Governor of the State Bank of Pakistan
- In office October 20, 2011 – January 31, 2014
- President: Asif Ali Zardari; Mamnoon Hussain
- Deputy: Kazi Abdul Muktadir; Ashraf Mahmood Wathra
- Preceded by: Shahid Hafeez Kardar
- Succeeded by: Ashraf Mahmood Wathra

Deputy Governor of the State Bank of Pakistan
- In office March 29, 2007 – October 18, 2011
- President: Pervez Musharraf
- Succeeded by: Kazi Abdul Muktadir

Personal details
- Born: Yaseen Anwar; March 31, 1951 (age 75) Karachi, Sindh, Dominion of Pakistan
- Education: Wharton School of the University of Pennsylvania; Aitchison College; Karachi Grammar School

Yaseen Anwar (born March 31, 1951) is a Pakistani-American banker who had been the Governor of the State Bank of Pakistan from 20 October 2011 to 31 January 2014. He previously also acted as deputy governor and has 33 years of experience in international banking. Anwar holds a dual Pakistan and US citizenship. He is a graduate of the Wharton Business School at the University of Pennsylvania.

Before that, Yaseen Anwar acted as Deputy Governor from 2007 to 2011. During this tenure as Deputy Governor, he served as Acting Governor for 3 months each in 2010 and 2011 prior to being confirmed as Governor. After the State Bank, he served as Senior Advisor to the Industrial & Commercial Bank of China out of Singapore and Pakistan from 2014 to 2020. In 2020 he was the founding Chairman of Yaseen Anwar & Associates, a management consultancy based in Karachi, Pakistan. He is also Senior Advisor in Pakistan to the International Finance Corporation for Sustainable Banking, a member of the World Bank Group. Prior to his joining the State Bank of Pakistan, he had a long international banking career in New York, Paris, London, and Egypt with JPMorgan Chase, Bank of America, and Merrill Lynch.

== Early life and education ==
Yaseen Anwar was born in Karachi, Dominion of Pakistan, the son of Ismat and Commodore Sheikh M. Anwar, a decorated Pakistan Naval War hero. At the age of seven, his father was posted in Newport, Rhode Island to attend the Naval War College and thereafter as the Naval Attache in Washington D.C. until December 1964 when Yaseen attended the Rose Lee Hardy elementary School and was elected President of the Student Council. Yaseen then attended Ascension Academy in Alexandria, Virginia until the ninth grade before moving back to Karachi where he joined the Karachi American School His father, as the Naval Attache, was decorated with the Legion of Merit by the President of the United States for forging strong ties between the two countries.

At the Karachi American School, Yaseen was elected President of the Student Council, Captain of the Varsity Basketball team, and Editor of the school newspaper. After graduation, he attended the Wharton School at the University of Pennsylvania where he graduated with a BSc degree in economics and a B.A. in political science in 1972. During his undergraduate years, he was a Varsity Letterman on the University Squash team. He is often invited to speak at the Wharton School's Global Economic Forums on Central Banking, most recently in Singapore March 10, 2023 and has also been spotlighted in the Wharton School's Magazine.

== Career ==
In 1973, Yaseen joined the Credit training program at the Chase Manhattan Bank in New York where he spent 2 ½ years that included the International Department before joining the Bank of America in Paris in January 1976. In the Paris regional office, he worked with senior officers by honing his skills in Syndications & Private Placements. He then moved to London in 1977 to join the Middle East Regional office where he looked after Corporate & Institutional relationships in Saudi Arabia and the Gulf region. In 1979, he was transferred to Bank of America Cairo as Assistant Manager and a senior lending officer for local and multinational businesses. In 1982 he moved to Bank of America in New York where he managed the Middle East Financial institutions and concurrently the Global Export Finance Group that included relationship management of US EXIM Bank, USDA, OPIC, World Bank, Asian Development Bank, EBRD, and others.

In 1992, Yaseen joined the original Merrill Lynch (pre-Bank of America merger) in New York and switched to focusing on Wealth Management, Asset Management, Alternative Investments, and Capital Markets. He spent almost 10 years at Merrill, being transferred to the London office in 1996. After leaving Merrill in London, he spent some time with Kraken, a boutique UK investment firm, where he structured M&A transactions in the Power Sector before joining the State Bank of Pakistan.

== State Bank of Pakistan (SBP) ==
Joining SBP in 2007, during his initial 4 years as Deputy Governor, he was tasked to upgrade the country's Payment System by establishing Real Time Gross Settlement (RTGS) that he successfully implemented in 2008. This led to a monumental change in the country's landscape towards instant Interbank Funds Transfers (IBFT), Mobile/Digital banking, internet banking, and other banking products that enabled 80% of the previously unbanked Adult population, immediate access to financial services and products. This access to financial services has been a boon to the country's Financial Inclusion program that continues to grow today on the foundation of RTGS.

During 2010 and 2011, he served as Acting Governor State Bank twice for 3-month periods before he was confirmed as Governor in 2011. During his tenure, he negotiated and signed the country's first Currency Swap Agreements (CSA) with China and Turkey and in 2012 became the 7th Central Bank to sign an Agency Agreement with the People's Bank of China to invest in local Government Bonds. As Governor, he had oversight of over 40 banks, impacted Monetary Policy, and elevated the Branch-less Banking model/ strategy for Financial Inclusion, the success of which was recognized globally. Despite the 2008 financial crisis, not one bank failed in Pakistan during his tenure due to vigilant liquidity management and restructuring of marginally capitalized banks.

Pakistan in 2013 also witnessed serious balance of payments stress with a current account deficit of 2% that was managed meticulously by securing over $2.5 Billion from the CSA with China, the Peoples Bank of China and Industrial & Commercial Bank of China. This $2.5 Billion plugged up the current account gap thereby maintaining the PKR Currency stable throughout the year. In August 2013, he successfully negotiated and signed the $6.7 Billion IMF facility that elevated the country's Reserves, restored confidence in the economy with the Capital Markets, and elevated Pakistan's International ratings to a Positive outlook. In 2020, he was interviewed on the IMF Program as according to the IMF, the $6.7 Billion facility is the only one Pakistan has competed satisfactorily without suspension.

During his stint as Governor of the Central Bank, he was a member of the Board of Governors of the IMF, and served on the Financial Stability Board of Asia when it was first formed in 2012 under the Chairmanship of the BOE Governor.

In 2014, he left the State Bank and from 2014 – 2020, he was Senior Advisor to the Industrial & Commercial Bank of China in Singapore and is currently the founding chairman of management consultants, 'Yaseen Anwar & Associates' in Pakistan. Concurrently, in December 2020, the World Bank/IFC appointed him Senior Banking Policy Advisor for Pakistan Sustainable Banking. In 2021, he was also appointed by China as chairman of the first overseas chapter of Green Investment Principles for Central Asia & Pakistan in support of the Belt & Road Initiative. He also serves on the International Advisory Boards of the Official Monetary and Financial Institutions Forum in the UK, the International Monetary Institute of Renmin University, Beijing, and Zhejiang University International Business School (ZIBS) China. He is often invited to speak at various International Forums in Asia and the U.S.

== Notable Appointments/Achievements ==
- Only Central Bank Governor in the history of the State Bank of Pakistan to have successfully negotiated and signed Currency Swap Agreements with China and Turkey.
- As Governor, negotiated and signed the $6.7 Billion IMF agreement with the IMF in August 2013, the only one completed satisfactorily (without suspension) in Pakistan's history according to the IMF.
- A Pioneer in the launching of the Chinese Yuan in 2013 as an International Reserve Currency in the SDR basket of the IMF, officially inducted by IMF in 2015/2016.
- As governor of the Central Bank, actively promoted and elevated the branchless banking model in Pakistan for inclusive banking targeting the 80% of the unbanked market. Recognized as one of three countries for its success by the Economic Intelligence Unit of the Economist magazine.
- Recognized as a 'Notable' graduate to have become a Central Bank Governor in the history of the Wharton School, University of Pennsylvania.
- In March 2020, Spotlighted in an interview on the global economy by the Wharton School of Business magazine, University of Pennsylvania.
- Invited to speak in New York at the United Nations (UNCTAD) on Pakistan's Branchless banking model with numerous Heads of State. Also spoke at the World Affairs Council in Pittsburgh, U.S.A. in 2013.
- Internationally recognized former Central Bank Governor quoted by publications released by the Bank of International Settlements and leading Business Schools i.e. Wharton, INSEAD.
- Advisory Boards of the International Monetary Institute of Renmin University, Beijing, the Official Monetary & Financial Institutions Forum U.K. and Zhejiang University International Business School China.
- Chairman, Green Investment Principles for Central Asia & Pakistan in support of the Belt Road Initiative.
- As Sr. Advisor to the IFC/World Bank, aided IFC in upgrading the State Bank of Pakistan and the banking system in launching of the ESRM manual in 2022 on Green Banking Guidelines.
