= Shamshad Akhtar =

Pakistani politician, diplomat and banker (1954–2025)

- شمشاد اختر
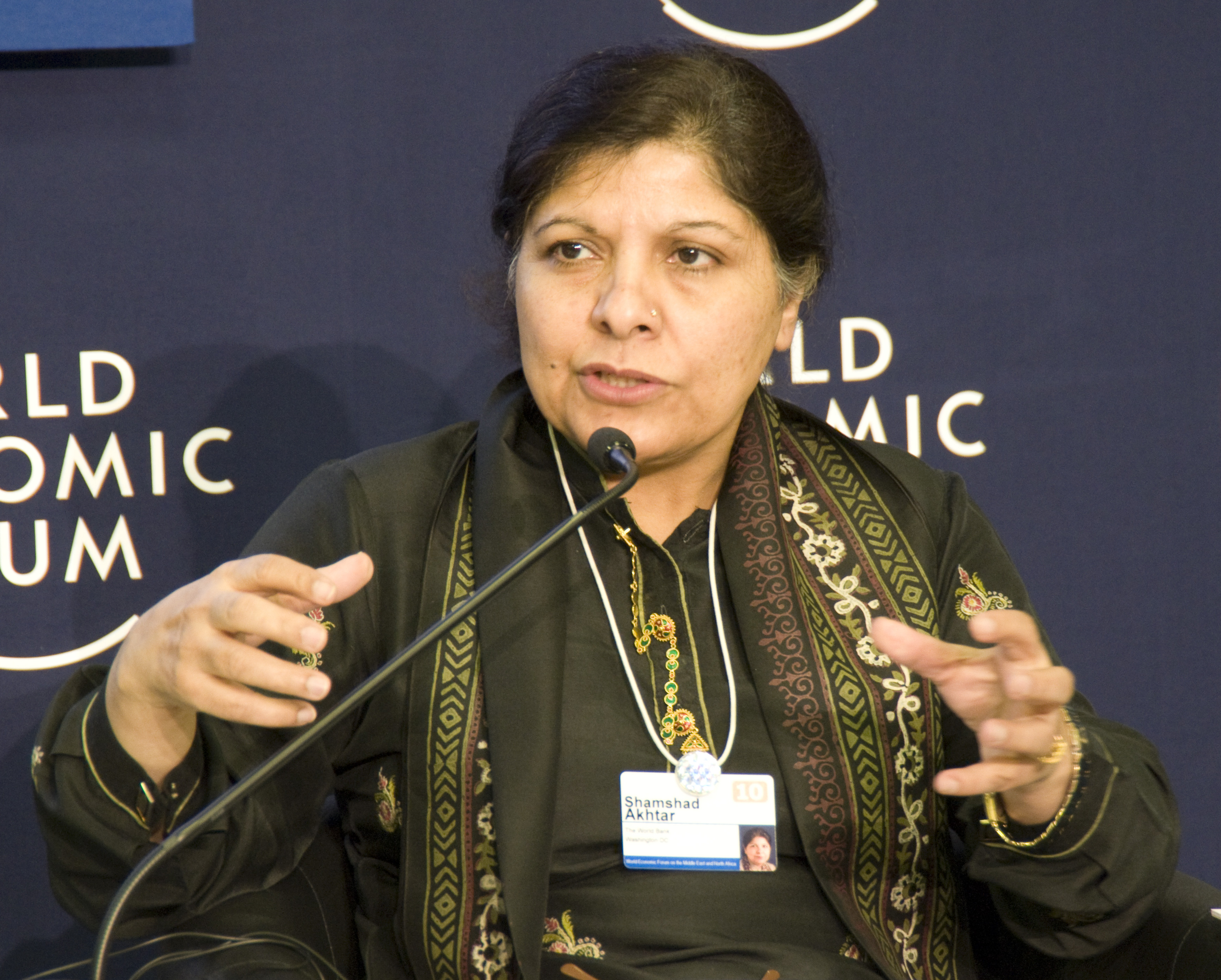
- Akhtar in 2010

Minister of Finance
- Caretaker
- In office 17 August 2023 – 4 March 2024
- President: Arif Alvi
- Prime Minister: Anwaar ul Haq Kakar
- Preceded by: Ishaq Dar
- Succeeded by: Muhammad Aurangzeb
- In office 5 June 2018 – 18 August 2018
- President: Mamnoon Hussain
- Prime Minister: Nasirul Mulk
- Preceded by: Miftah Ismail
- Succeeded by: Asad Umar

Executive Secretary of United Nations Economic and Social Commission for Asia and the Pacific (UN ESCAP)
- In office 10 December 2013 – 2018
- Preceded by: Noeleen Heyzer
- Succeeded by: Armida Salsiah Alisjahbana

14th Governor of the State Bank of Pakistan
- In office 2 December 2006 – 1 January 2009
- Prime Minister: Yousaf Raza Gillani
- Preceded by: Ishrat Hussain
- Succeeded by: Syed Salim Raza

Vice President of World Bank for Middle East and North Africa
- In office 1 January 2009 – 6 July 2009

Personal details
- Born: 1954 Hyderabad, Sind Province, Pakistan
- Died: 27 December 2025 (aged 71)
- Party: Independent
- Education: University of the West of Scotland (PhD); University of Sussex (MA); Quaid-i-Azam University (MSc); University of the Punjab (BA)

Shamshad Akhtar (Urdu: شمشاد اختر; 1954 – 27 December 2025) was a Pakistani development economist, United Nations diplomat, banker and politician who served as the caretaker finance minister of Pakistan from 2023 to 2024 as well as from 5 June 2018 to 18 August 2018.

Prior to that, she served as the 14th Governor of the State Bank of Pakistan, the first woman to assume this position. She also served as a senior adviser to the then Secretary-General of the United Nations, Ban Ki-moon and as Vice-President of the World Bank.

In December 2013, Akhtar was selected by the UN Secretary-General as Under-Secretary-General and the 10th Chief Secretary of the Monetary and Social Commission for Asia and the Pacific (ESCAP).

In 2023, she served as the caretaker finance minister in the Kakar caretaker government.

== Early life and education ==
Shamshad Akhtar was born in Hyderabad, Sindh, Pakistan.

She moved to the United Kingdom on a Commonwealth Scholarship to study at the University of Sussex, receiving an M.A. in development economics in 1977. She moved to the University of the West of Scotland (then Paisley College of Technology) where she was awarded a PhD in Economics in 1980.

== Career ==
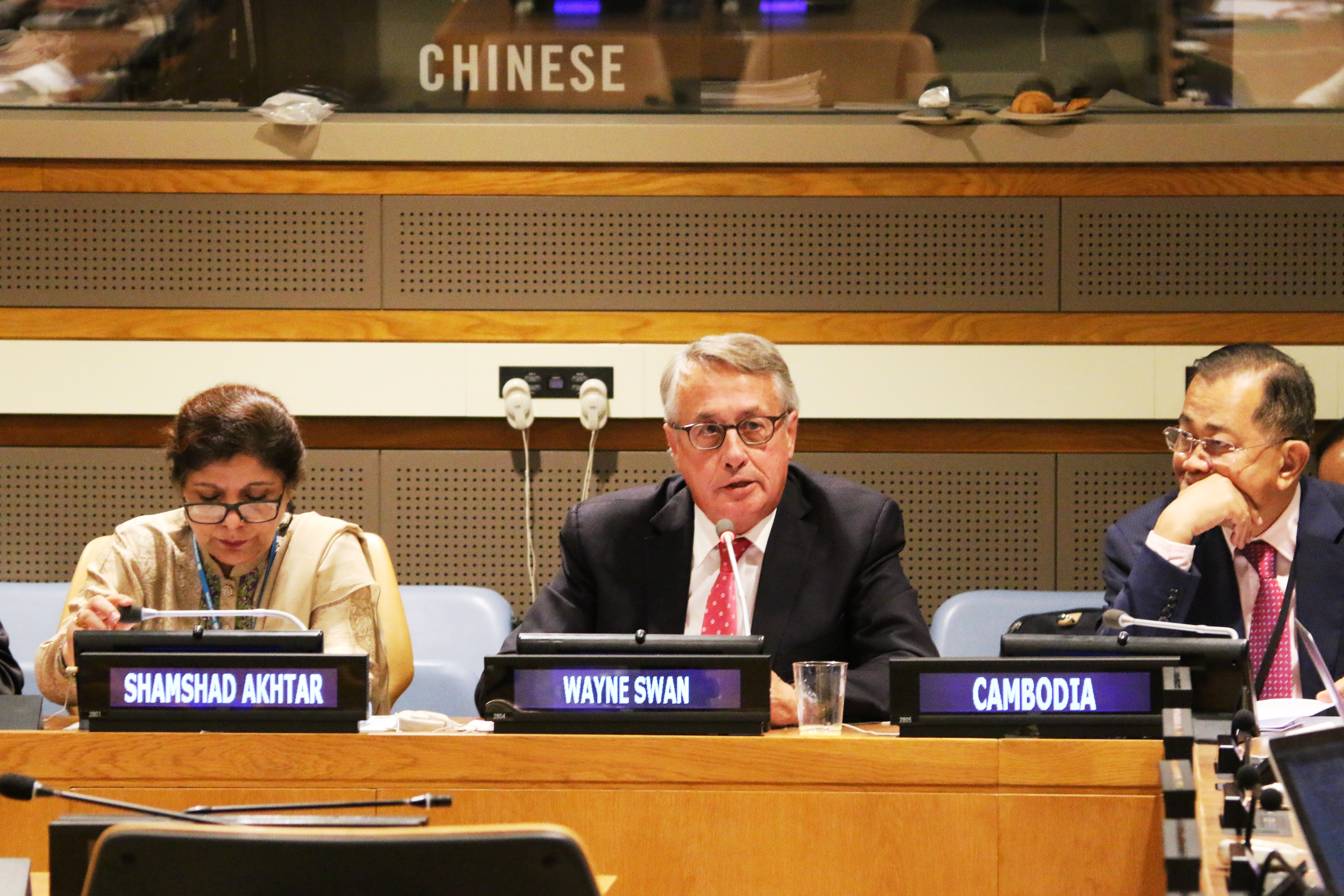
Akhtar, on far left, chairing the 2030 Agenda for Sustainable Development

Akhtar started her career in 1980 with the Planning Commission in Islamabad but moved a few months later to work with the World Bank's Resident Mission in Pakistan as a country economist. She left in 1986 for a year-long sabbatical to attend John F. Kennedy School of Government at Harvard University as a postdoctoral researcher under the Fulbright Program.

In 2005, she moved back to Pakistan to serve as the 14th Governor of the State Bank of Pakistan, a position she retained until January 2009.

In 2009, Akhtar re-joined the Asian Development Bank as a senior adviser to Haruhiko Kuroda. She moved to Washington, D.C. to be able to work at the World Bank and served as the Vice President, World Bank Middle East and North Africa region. During this period, she spearheaded the bank's response to the Arab Spring political campaign and the Arab regional integration strategy and its implementation.

In September 2011, she moved to the United Nations to serve as the Assistant Secretary-General for Economic and Social Affairs and Senior Adviser on Economic Development and Finance to the UN Secretary-General Ban Ki-moon.

In December 2013, Akhtar was appointed the 10th Executive Secretary of UNESCAP in Bangkok.

In 2020, Akhtar was appointed by United Nations Secretary-General António Guterres to serve on the Advisory Committee for the 2021 Food Systems Summit, chaired by Inger Andersen.

In 2023, Akhtar was appointed caretaker finance minister of Pakistan in the Kakar caretaker government.

== Wealth ==
According to Election Commission of Pakistan, prior to assuming her role as caretaker finance minister in 2023, Akhtar declared her net worth to be Rs. 2.94 billion (US$11 million). Among the mentioned assets are Rs. 2.8 billion (US$10 million) in Naya Pakistan Certificates, Rs. 109 million (US$390,000) in Pakistani treasury bills, shares of Pakistan State Oil worth Rs. 0.3 million, and residential plots in DHA. Akhtar also had more than Rs. 27 million (US$97,000) deposited in different banks.

== Death ==
Akhtar died on 27 December 2025 from a cardiac arrest at the age of 71.

== Awards and honours ==
- On 23 October 2007, Akhtar was conferred Best Central Bank Governor for Asia 2007 by the Euromoney Institutional Investor.
- On 11 November 2008, Akhtar was named amongst the top ten women leaders in Asia by The Wall Street Journal.
- On 23 March 2024, Akhtar was honored with the Nishan-e-Imtiaz in recognition of her service in the public sector.

Preceded by Ishrat Husain	Governor of State Bank of Pakistan; 2006–2009	Succeeded by Syed Salim Raza
