= Shujaat Ali Hasnie =

Governor of State Bank of Pakistan

Syed Shujaat Ali Hasnie

3rd Governor of the State Bank of Pakistan
- In office July 20, 1960 – July 19, 1967
- Preceded by: Abdul Qadir
- Succeeded by: Mahbubur Raschid

Personal details
- Born: 1905 Sialkot, British India
- Died: 1968 (aged 62–63)
- Occupation: Civil servant

Syed Shujaat Ali Hasnie (1905–1968) was a Pakistani civil servant who served as the third Governor of the State Bank of Pakistan from 1960 to 1967.

== Early life and education ==
Hasnie was born 1905 in Sialkot. He earned an M.S. degree in biology from the University of the Punjab in 1927.

== Career ==
Prior to the partition of India, Hasnie worked in the Government of India, holding positions such as Under Secretary and Deputy Secretary in the Ministry of Finance, and Joint Financial Adviser for War and Supply. After the partition, he served in Pakistan as Joint Secretary and later Secretary of the Ministry of Commerce. During his tenure, he represented Pakistan at General Agreement on Tariffs and Trade (GATT) meetings and was chairman of GATT in 1951.

Hasnie later served as Secretary of the Ministry of Food and Agriculture and was actively involved with the Food and Agriculture Organization (FAO) from 1952, serving as Independent Chairman of the FAO Council from 1955 to 1959. Following his tenure as Finance Secretary, he was appointed Governor of the State Bank of Pakistan, a role he held until 1967. Ayub Khan inaugurated the new State Bank of Pakistan building in Karachi during his tenure on 4 November 1961.
