= Shakirullah Durrani =

Governor, State Bank of Pakistan

Shakirullah Khan Durrani

5th Governor of the State Bank of Pakistan
- In office 1 July 1971 – 22 December 1971
- Preceded by: Mahbubur Raschid
- Succeeded by: Ghulam Ishaq Khan

Personal details
- Born: 3 March 1928
- Died: 20 November 2009 (aged 81)
- Spouse: Samina Durrani
- Children: Tehmina Durrani

Shakirullah Khan Durrani (also known as "Shakir K. Durrani.", and also transliterated as "Shakir'ullah"; Urdu: شاکر اللہ درانی; 3 March 1928 – 20 November 2009) was a Pakistani banker who served as the managing director of Pakistan International Airlines and Governor of the State Bank of Pakistan. His daughter Tehmina Durrani is married to the former Chief Minister of Punjab and the current Prime Minister of Pakistan, Shehbaz Sharif.

== Banking career ==
After leaving military service, Durrani started a career in banking. After some years in England, Durrani returned home to be appointed Deputy Managing Director of Pakistan Industrial Credit and Investment Corporation (PICIC) in 1962.

In February 1966, the Pakistani government established the Investment Corporation of Pakistan (ICP), a government-owned mutual fund with the objective of enlarging the investor base and developing the capital markets in Pakistan, and Durrani was appointed its first managing director.

On 13 September 1968, the Pakistani government nationalized Pakistan International Airlines and appointed Durrani as its new managing director.

In July 1971, he was appointed Governor of the State Bank of Pakistan but when the Pakistani military government lost a disastrous war against India in December, SU Durrani's meteoric rise was over. When Zulfiqar Ali Bhutto became president and Chief Martial Law Administrator of Pakistan in December 1971, Durrani was put under house arrest and later sent to prison. No charges were brought against Durrani.

After his release from prison, Durrani resumed his banking career. In the 1970s, Bankers Equity Limited (BEL) arranged a joint venture between him and a large Japanese leasing company --- Orient Leasing (later Orix), one of largest commercial aircraft lessors. BEL took 25% of the equity; the Japanese took 40%; Durrani's business partner took 4% with Durrani taking the rest (31%). SU Durrani was appointed Chairman of the Orient Leasing Pakistan Limited (OLP) with Humayun Murad as General Manager and his nominee. The Japanese managed the company till 1990, when the company went public. The Japanese directors took up assignments in Europe with the 43-year-old Humayun Murad appointed as managing director and Durrani remained as Vice Chairman.

Durrani later took on a number of projects in his home district, Charsadda, aimed at helping Pashtuns and Pakistanis, including job creation and funding humanitarian projects, development and charities. These projects included a fructose factory and Frontier Ceramics.

== See also ==
- Tehmina Durrani
- List of Pashtuns
