= Vasim Aon Jafarey =

9th Governor of the State Bank of Pakistan
- In office 10 July 1986 – 16 August 1988
- Preceded by: Aftab Ghulam Nabi Kazi
- Succeeded by: Imtiaz Alam Hanfi

Personal details
- Died: 2011
- Occupation: Civil servant

Vasim Aon Jafarey was a Pakistani civil servant who served as the ninth Governor of the State Bank of Pakistan.

== Early life and education ==
Jafarey was born in Allahabad, Uttar Pradesh, in British India. He studied economics and English at Allahabad University.

His father was a colonel in the Indian Army's Medical Corps. In 1947, Jafarey moved to Pakistan following his father's decision.

== Career ==
Jafarey was among the first batch of the Civil Service of Pakistan. During his career, he served as Secretary of Commerce, Planning, and Industries; Ambassador to Brussels; 9th Governor of the State Bank of Pakistan; 6th President of Institute of Chartered Accountants of Pakistan during 1970-72, Chairman of the Banking Islamization Commission; Executive Assistant to President Ghulam Ishaq Khan; and Advisor on Finance with the rank of federal minister to Prime Minister Benazir Bhutto during her two terms.

After the 1988 general elections, Jafarey was appointed as an advisor to Prime Minister Benazir Bhutto by the establishment, along with President Ghulam Ishaq Khan and Foreign Minister Sahibzada Yaqub Ali Khan. He was later appointed as Advisor on Finance when Bhutto was re-elected in 1993.
