= Hanif Ramay =

Pakistani politician (1930–2006)

7th Chief Minister of Punjab
- In office 15 March 1974 – 15 July 1975
- President: Fazal Ilahi Chaudhry
- Prime Minister: Zulfikar Ali Bhutto
- Preceded by: Ghulam Mustafa Khar
- Succeeded by: Sadiq Hussain Qureshi

Personal details
- Born: Muhammad Hanif Ramay; 1930 Simla, Punjab Province, British India
- Died: 1 January 2006 (aged 75-76) Lahore, Punjab, Pakistan
- Resting place: DHA Lahore, Punjab Pakistan
- Party: Pakistan Peoples Party
- Spouse: Shaheen Ramay (M-1957-died 1989) Sakina Joyce (M-1992)
- Children: Ibraheem; Maryam
- Education: Government College University and Punjab University
- Occupation: Artist; Writer; Politician
- Profession: Politician; Intellectual
- Chief Minister: Sadiq Hussain Qureshi

Muhammad Hanif Ramay (Note: Punjabi/Urdu: محمد حنیف رامے) (1930 – 1 January 2006) was a Pakistani politician, painter and journalist who served as the seventh chief minister of Punjab from 1974 to 1975. He was among the founders of the Pakistan Peoples Party (PPP), and also served as the speaker of the Punjab Assembly from October 1993 to February 1997.

== Early life and education ==
Hanif Ramay was born in Shimla in 1930 in an Arain Punjabi family. After completing a B.A. honors degree from Government College Lahore (the most prestigious educational institution in Lahore), he did his Masters in Economics and Philosophy from Punjab University.

Ramay had an interest in politics from his college years in Lahore; he held various leadership positions in the local political scene of Lahore.

== Artistic career ==
=== Literature ===
Ramay was a prolific Urdu writer whose literary activity spanned several genres and decades. His engagement with literature was shaped early by his family background in publishing; his family owned a printing press and published the literary magazine Adab-e-Latif. In his early career, Ramay also served on the editorial board of the avant-garde Urdu journal Sawera, which published fiction, poetry, and critical essays on literature and culture. As an author, Ramay wrote across a wide thematic range, including religion, politics, social commentary, and self-help, and also produced an English-language novel, initially published under the title Second Adam. Unlike many artists for whom writing was a secondary activity, Ramay regarded writing as a primary mode of intellectual and creative expression and used it to communicate ideas he believed could not be adequately conveyed through other media. His literary works include essays and books that combine political analysis with religious and ethical reflection, notably titles such as Punjab ka Muqaddama and Dubb-e-Akbar, in which he addressed contemporary social and political issues through a discursive and polemical prose style.

=== Painting and calligraphy ===
Alongside his literary activity, Ramay maintained a sustained practice in painting and calligraphy, in which literary and religious themes featured prominently. His visual work frequently drew on classical Urdu poetry, Sufi literature, and religious symbolism, translating well-known textual and poetic motifs into figurative and calligraphic compositions. Ramay produced series inspired by poets such as Mirza Ghalib and by figures from Islamic history and mysticism, including Imam Husayn and al-Hallaj, presenting these subjects through a visual idiom that combined narrative, symbolism, and political allegory. His calligraphic practice occupied a significant place in his oeuvre and was marked by a departure from strict classical conventions in favor of formal experimentation. In particular, he explored multiple graphic renderings of the same sacred names and phrases, treating calligraphy as a site of visual variation rather than fixed orthography. Retrospective exhibitions documented, for example, 67 distinct visual treatments of the name of the Prophet Muhammad, each differing in composition, line, and spatial arrangement. This approach reflected Ramay’s interest in reinterpreting religious text through visual form and underscored his broader tendency to translate literary and devotional material into painterly and calligraphic idioms.

His visual practice is often described as modernist and calligraphic, combining elements of Islamic visual culture with contemporary modes of expression. Rather than adopting modernism primarily through Western stylistic models, Ramay drew extensively on Islamic art and South Asian visual traditions, incorporating calligraphy, abstraction, and symbolic motifs to construct layered visual narratives. His works frequently juxtapose traditional forms with experimental compositions, producing a hybrid aesthetic that situates classical calligraphic elements within modernist pictorial structures. Ramay’s painting and calligraphy have been exhibited in Pakistan and abroad. In Pakistan, his work has been shown at institutions such as the National Art Gallery in Islamabad, the Lahore Art Gallery, and the Karachi Arts Council. His works have also appeared in international exhibitions in venues in Europe, North America, and the Middle East, often within group exhibitions addressing intersections of art, politics, culture, and spirituality.

== Political career ==
=== Islamic socialism and founding of Pakistan Peoples Party ===
During the dictatorship of Ayub Khan in Pakistan in the 1960s, Ramay led a group of intellectuals in Lahore in developing Islamic socialist ideas, drawing on the thought of Ghulam Ahmed Perwez and Khalifa Abdul Hakim, along with Ba'athist thinkers such as Michel Aflaq. Ramay and his co-thinkers, mostly through the literary magazine Nusrat, influenced Zulfikar Ali Bhutto when he founded the Pakistan Peoples Party with Jalaludin Abdur Rahim, and they were the primary ideological influence on the party's manifesto. Ramay outlined the priorities for the PPP's brand of Islamic socialism as including elimination of feudalism and uncontrolled capitalism, greater state regulation of the economy, nationalisation of major banks, industries and schools, encouraging participatory management in factories and building democratic institutions. They contextualised these policies as a modern extension of principles of equality and justice contained in the Quran and practiced under the authority of Muhammad in Medina and Mecca.

=== Provincial assembly and Chief Ministership of Punjab ===
Hanif Ramay was elected member provincial assembly on PPP ticket in 1970. He was Punjab finance minister from 1972 to 1973, Punjab governor from February 1973 to March 1974 and was appointed chief minister of Punjab from 15 March 1974 to 15 July 1975. Later on, he developed differences with Zulfikar Ali Bhutto and thus was forced to resign form his position, and later imprisoned as a result of a malicious prosecution. During the same time frame he founded the left-wing newspaper Masawaat.

=== Exile to United States ===
In a self-imposed exile to evade prosecution from the military dictatorship, Hanif left for the U.S., in the late 1970s. Hanif Ramay was associated with the University of California, Berkeley in Northern California from 1980 to 1983. After the demise of his first wife (Ms. Shaheen), he married an American woman in 1992, then Joyce Murad, a widow of his close friend, and lived with her in Fort Myers, Florida (USA) for several years. Hanif was the author of many best selling Urdu and English books in Pakistan and abroad, the most famous book he ever wrote was titled Punjab ka Muqadma (Punjab's Trial).

=== Return to politics ===
After deciding to re-enter politics in Pakistan in early 1990s, he contested in the general election from Lahore on PPP ticket, and thus after winning he was selected as the Speaker of Punjab Assembly in 1993, and he remained in that position until 1996.

== Death ==
Ramay died on 1 January 2006 in Lahore after a prolonged illness resulting out of an accidental fall he took at his home.

== Books ==
His published writings span multiple genres, encompassing religious and political commentary, self-help literature, as well as a novel written in English, originally titled Second Adam. His books include:

| Year | Original Urdu title | English title | Description |
|---|---|---|---|
| 1969 | Dabb-e-Akbar (دبِّ اکبر) | The Great Bear | An early ideological and political work reflecting Hanif Ramay’s engagement with symbolism, social justice, and revolutionary thought. |
| 1970 | Iqbal aur Socialism (اقبال اور سوشلزم) | Iqbal and Socialism | An examination of Muhammad Iqbal’s thought in relation to socialist ideas, arguing for a synthesis between Islamic ethics and social equality. |
| 1975 | Islami Socialism (اسلامی سوشلزم) | Islamic Socialism | A systematic exposition of Ramay’s concept of Islamic socialism, emphasizing economic justice, equality, and moral responsibility. |
| 2005 | Islam ki Ruhani Qadren: Maut Nahin, Zindagi (اسلام کی روحانی قدریں: موت نہیں، زندگی) | The Spiritual Values of Islam: Not Death, but Life | A reflective work focusing on the spiritual and ethical dimensions of Islam, stressing vitality, moral renewal, and inner life. |

== Notes ==
Political offices
| Preceded by Ghulam Mustafa Khar | Governor of Punjab; 1973 – 1974 | Succeeded by Sadiq Hussain Qureshi |
| Preceded by Ghulam Mustafa Khar | Chief Minister of Punjab; 1974 – 1975 | Succeeded by Sadiq Hussain Qureshi |
