= Mahbubur Raschid =

East Pakistani banker

4th Governor of the State Bank of Pakistan
- In office July 20, 1967 – July 1, 1971
- Preceded by: Shujaat Ali Hasnie
- Succeeded by: Shahkur Durrani

Personal details
- Occupation: Banker

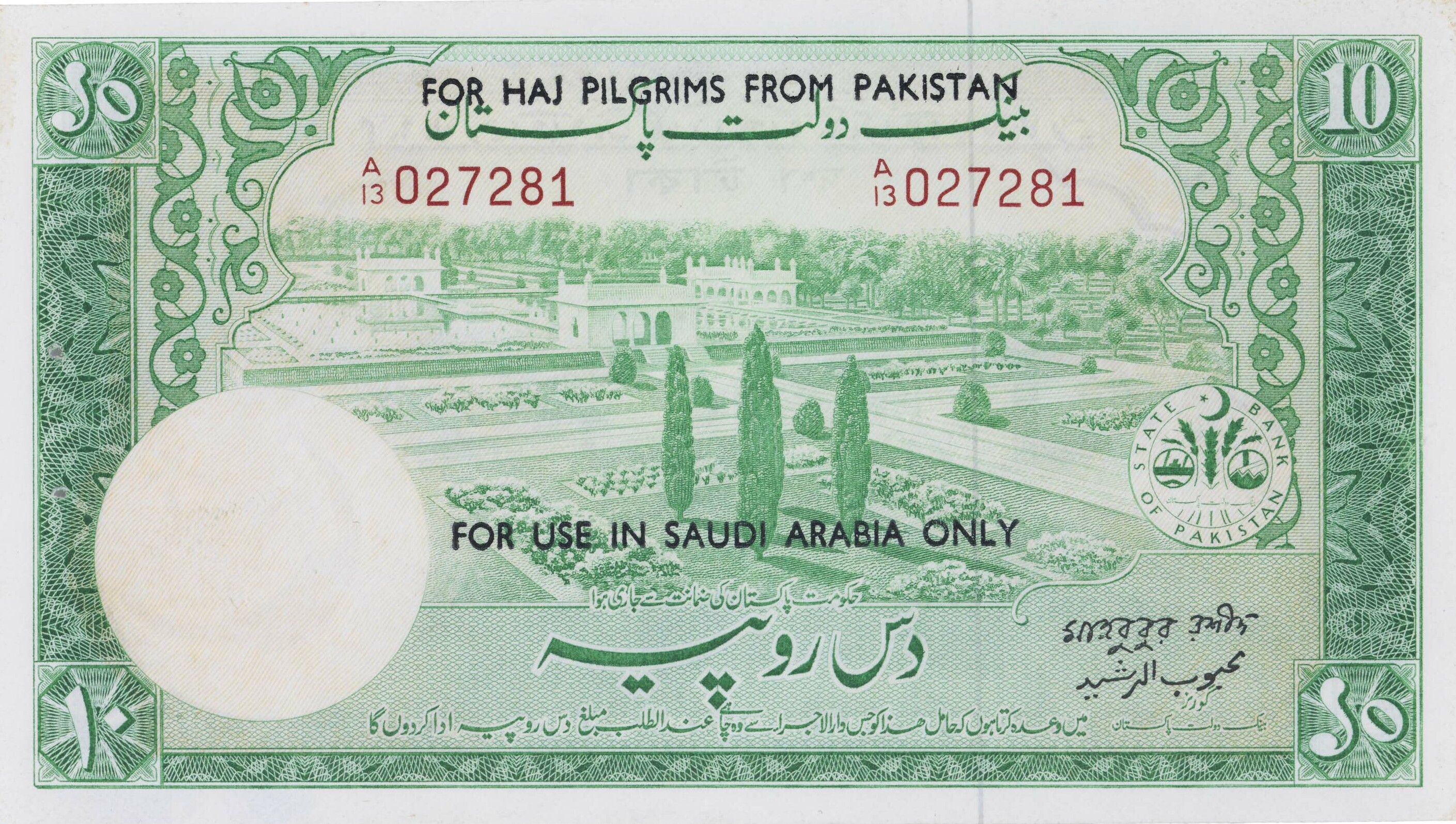
A Pakistani Haj note of Rs 10 bearing Raschid's signature.

Mahbubur Raschid was a banker from East Pakistan who served as the Governor of the State Bank of Pakistan from 1967 to 1971. He was the first career banker to serve as the governor of the State Bank of Pakistan.

== Early life and education ==
Raschid was from East Pakistan. He received his early education in commerce and arts from the United Kingdom and later studied banking systems and financial institutions in Japan, Britain, Germany, and Italy between 1961 and 1967.

== Career ==
Raschid began his banking career in 1939 and held executive roles, including deputy managing director of the National Bank of Pakistan in East Pakistan and founding managing director of the Industrial Development Bank of Pakistan. After his tenure at the SBP, he was appointed deputy chairman of the Planning Commission on July 1, 1971.

== Awards and recognition ==
Raschid was awarded the Tamgha-e-Pakistan in 1959 and the Sitara-e-Quaid-e-Azam in 1964.
