= HabibMetro =

Pakistani subsidiary founded in 1992

Habib Metropolitan Bank

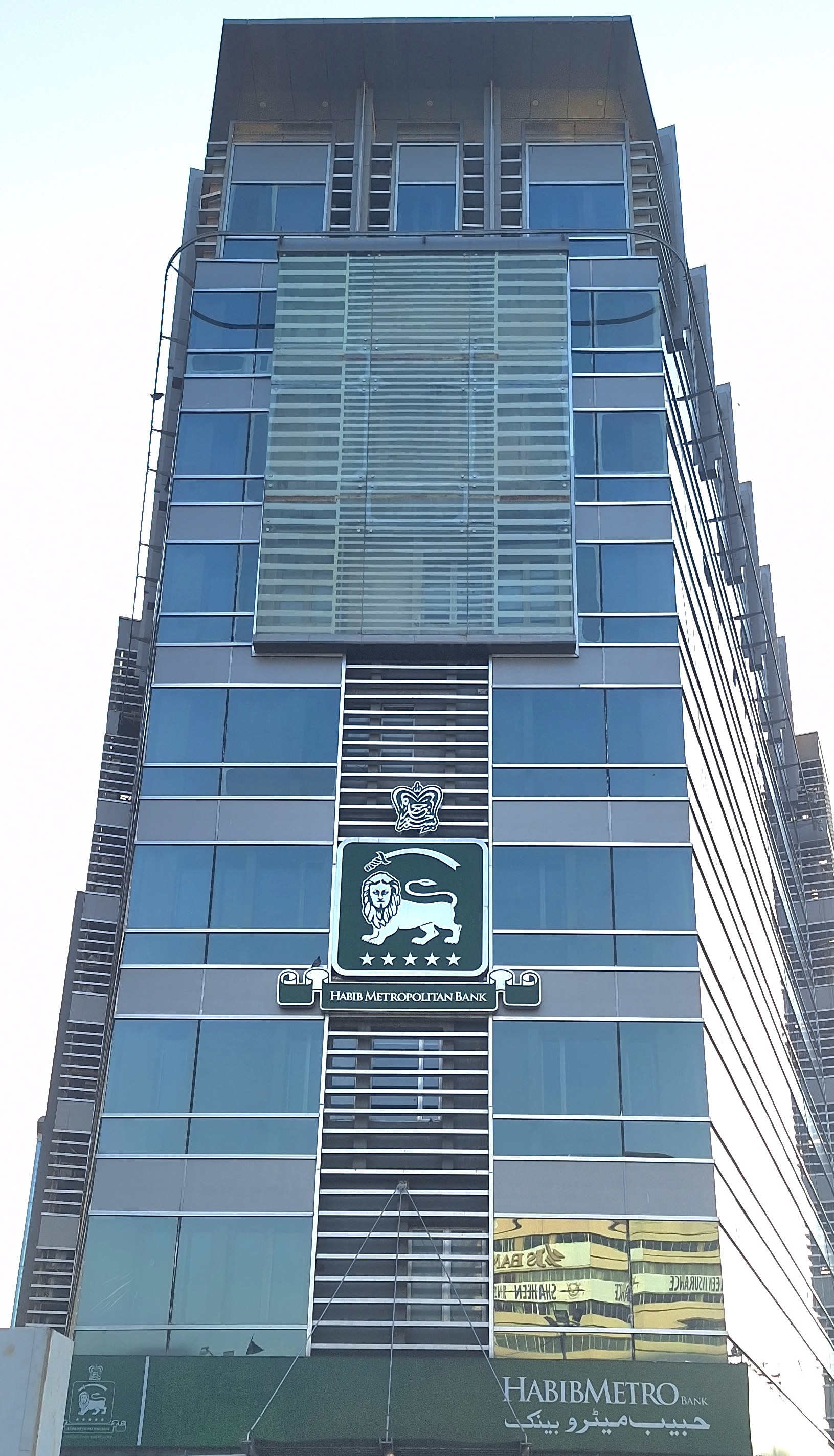
- Headquarters of HabibMetro on I.I. Chundrigar Road in Karachi
- Type: Public
- Traded as: PSX: HMB; KSE 100 component
- Industry: Conventional banking Islamic banking
- Founded: October 1992; 34 years ago
- Headquarters: Karachi, Pakistan
- Key people: Khurram Shahzad Khan (CEO); Mohamedali R. Habib (chairman)
- Products: Loans; Debit cards Credit cards Savings; Consumer banking Business banking Islamic banking
- Revenue: ▼ Rs. 92.844 billion (US$330 million) (2025)
- Operating income: ▼ Rs. 50.00 billion (US$180 million) (2025)
- Net income: ▼ Rs. 23.160 billion (US$83 million) (2025)
- Total assets: ▲ Rs. 1.691 trillion (US$6.0 billion) (2025)
- Total equity: ▲ Rs. 134.074 billion (US$480 million) (2025)
- Owner: House of Habib (Mohammedali branch)
- Number of employees: 6,316 (2025)
- Parent: Habib Bank AG Zurich
- Subsidiaries: Habib Metropolitan Financial Services; Habib Metropolitan Modaraba Management; HabibMetro Exchange Services; First Habib Modaraba (15.43%)
- Website: habibmetro.com

HABIBMETRO (Urdu pronunciation: [ha.ˈbiːb mɛ.ˈʈɾo] hah-BEEB-meh-TRO; stylized in all uppercase) is a Pakistani commercial bank headquartered in Karachi. It is a subsidiary of Swiss bank Habib Bank AG Zurich.

== History ==
=== 1992–2011: Early years, growth, and focus on trade finance ===
HabibMetro's main branch on I.I. Chundrigar Road in Karachi

Habib Metropolitan Bank was established in 1992 as a subsidiary of Habib Bank AG Zurich, following the government's decision in 1991 to allow private banks in Pakistan. The bank is named after Habib Esmail, the founder of Habib Bank Limited, and is owned by the descendants of Habib's third son, Mohammedali Habib. The other branch of Habib family founded Bank AL Habib, which is owned by the descendants of Habib's elder son, Dawood Habib. The bank was listed on the Karachi Stock Exchange in the same year.

Kassim Parekh, who had served as the president of Habib Bank from 1984 to 1988, was appointed as chairman and CEO of Metropolitan Bank in 1992. During his tenure, the bank's growth was limited to Karachi and trade finance.

In 2006, Habib Bank AG Zurich's Pakistan operations were merged into Metropolitan Bank Limited and the bank was subsequently renamed as Habib Metropolitan Bank Limited.

In April 2008, Kassim Parekh left HabibMetro and was succeeded by Anjum Iqbal, a former Citibank executive. During Anjum Iqbal's tenure, the bank's deposits grew at an annual rate of 9.5 percent, which was lower than the average inflation rate of 15.4 percent and the banking industry's growth rate of 13.7 percent. Iqbal's notable impact was shifting the bank's lending focus from the private sector to the government. After his departure in December 2011, Iqbal was appointed CEO of Habib Bank AG Zurich's operations in Britain.

=== 2011–present: Expansion outside of Karachi ===
In December 2011, Sirajuddin Aziz, former CEO of Bank Alfalah, was appointed as the new CEO of Habib Metropolitan Bank. Aziz aimed to leverage the bank's reputation in trade finance for Karachi's exporters by extending lending to their supply chain. He initiated expansion of the bank outside of Karachi, focusing on small industrial and agricultural clusters, particularly in Punjab. During Aziz's tenure, the bank's branch network grew by 77 percent, from 163 to 289 branches, with nearly three-quarters of the new branches being established outside Karachi and major cities. By June 2018, the bank had a presence in over 100 cities, compared to 21 cities prior to his tenure.

Aziz also rebranded the bank as HabibMetro in an effort to enhance its appeal across Pakistan. During his tenure, the bank deposits grew by 17.3 percent annually, compared to the industry average of 13.1 percent. The bank's net income also grew by 11.4 percent per year, which was higher than the industry average of 5.2 percent.

In 2015, HabibMetro received Asian Development Bank (ADB) award.

In 2018, Mohsin Nathani succeeded Sirajuddin Aziz as the CEO of the bank.

== Islamic banking ==
Habib Metropolitan Bank established its Islamic banking division in 2004, but it had a limited presence. In 2014, the division was branded as Sirat, following the trend of using Arabic terms for Shariah-compliant services.

== FinCEN ==
HABIBMETRO was named in FinCEN leak, published by Buzzfeed News and the International Consortium of Investigative Journalists (ICIJ). It had two suspicious transactions flagged.
