= Ashraf Mahmood Wathra =

Pakistani-Canadian banker

18th Governor of the State Bank of Pakistan
- In office April 29, 2014 – April 28, 2017
- Preceded by: Yaseen Anwar
- Succeeded by: Tariq Bajwa

Deputy Governor of the State Bank of Pakistan
- In office March 11, 2013 – April 29, 2014

Personal details
- Occupation: Banker

Ashraf Mahmood Wathra (born October 1955) is a Pakistani Canadian banker. He served as the 18th Governor of State Bank of Pakistan. He was appointed as the State Bank Governor on 29 April 2014 and served until 28 April 2017.

Wathra represents Pakistan in several international forums. He serves on the board of governors of the International Monetary Fund, Asian Clearing Union and ECO Trade and Development Bank. He is also the council member of Islamic Financial Stability Board. Since July 1, 2015, Wathra has been the co-chair of the Financial Stability Board - Regional Consultative Group for Asia (FSB-RCG Asia). He will serve as co-chair for a period of two years.

Wathra holds positions within Pakistan including the member of Monetary and Fiscal Policies Coordination Board, National Financial Inclusion Strategy (NFIS) Council, National Executive Committee on Anti Monetary Laundering (AML), and chair of the Board of Institute of Bankers in Pakistan (IBP), NFIS Steering Committee, and Agricultural Credit Advisory Committee (ACAC).

Wathra's association with the SBP started when he assumed charge of the office of Deputy Governor, on March 11, 2013. The Federal Government notified his appointment as Deputy Governor, SBP on March 5, 2013, for a period of three years from the date he assumed office.

Prior to joining SBP, he had been associated with various international and national banks and worked in various regulatory regimes in leadership positions; including Singapore, Hong Kong, Australia, Bangladesh, Sri Lanka etc. He also served as a member of Board of Directors of Habib Finance International Hong Kong, Habib Finance Australia and as First Vice Chairman of Himalayan Bank Nepal for several years.

He had started his career with Grindlays Bank Plc in 1978.

== See also ==
- Governor of State Bank of Pakistan
