= Alec Hastilow =

English cricketer

Cyril Alexander Frederick (Alec) Hastilow CBE (31 May 1895 – 30 September 1975) was an English first-class cricketer who played in two matches for Warwickshire in 1919. He was also prominent in cricket administration as chairman of the Warwickshire club and on the committee of the Marylebone Cricket Club (MCC) at times of significant decisions in the late 1950s and early 1960s. A businessman, he was chairman for many years of Smith and Nephew. He was born in Aston in Birmingham and died in Moseley, also in Birmingham.

As a cricketer, Hastilow, a right-handed batsman and a right-arm slow bowler, had a very long career on the fringes of first-class cricket, though he appeared in Warwickshire's first team only twice, both times in the 1919 season when the county cricket teams often struggled for players because of the depredations of the First World War and the slow demobilisation of service personnel. The transitory nature of cricket in that season is demonstrated by the fact that in Hastilow's second match – the match against Worcestershire which was not a County Championship match, Worcestershire not able to enter the competition that season – there were 11 players making their first-class debuts and seven, including Hastilow, appearing for the last time; his 14 in his only innings and his two wickets for 56 runs were the best batting and bowling performances of his career.

Below first-class cricket, however, Hastilow was tireless, playing for the Warwickshire Club and Ground team from before the First World War until after the Second World War and appearing in second eleven cricket for the county from 1930 through to 1947. When he retired from playing, he took on a succession of administrative posts as honorary secretary, chairman and president. He was Warwickshire's delegate to several important cricket committees and as a member of the MCC committee he sat on sub-committees that reported on the future structure of the game in the late 1950s and early 1960s, including the abolition of amateur status in first-class cricket and the introduction of the first one-day competition.

Hastilow had a distinguished industrial career and was on the board of the UK's leading paint manufacturer Pinchin Johnson and of the hygiene products group Southalls; from 1962 to 1968 he was chairman of Smith and Nephew, which had acquired Southalls in 1957. During the Second World War he worked for the Ministry of Supply and was awarded the OBE in 1947; this was upgraded to a CBE in 1955.

His daughter Helen Rosemary married the Pakistan cricket captain Abdul Hafeez Kardar, who also played for Warwickshire.
