= Ishrat Husain =

Pakistani civil servant

Ishrat Hussain NI
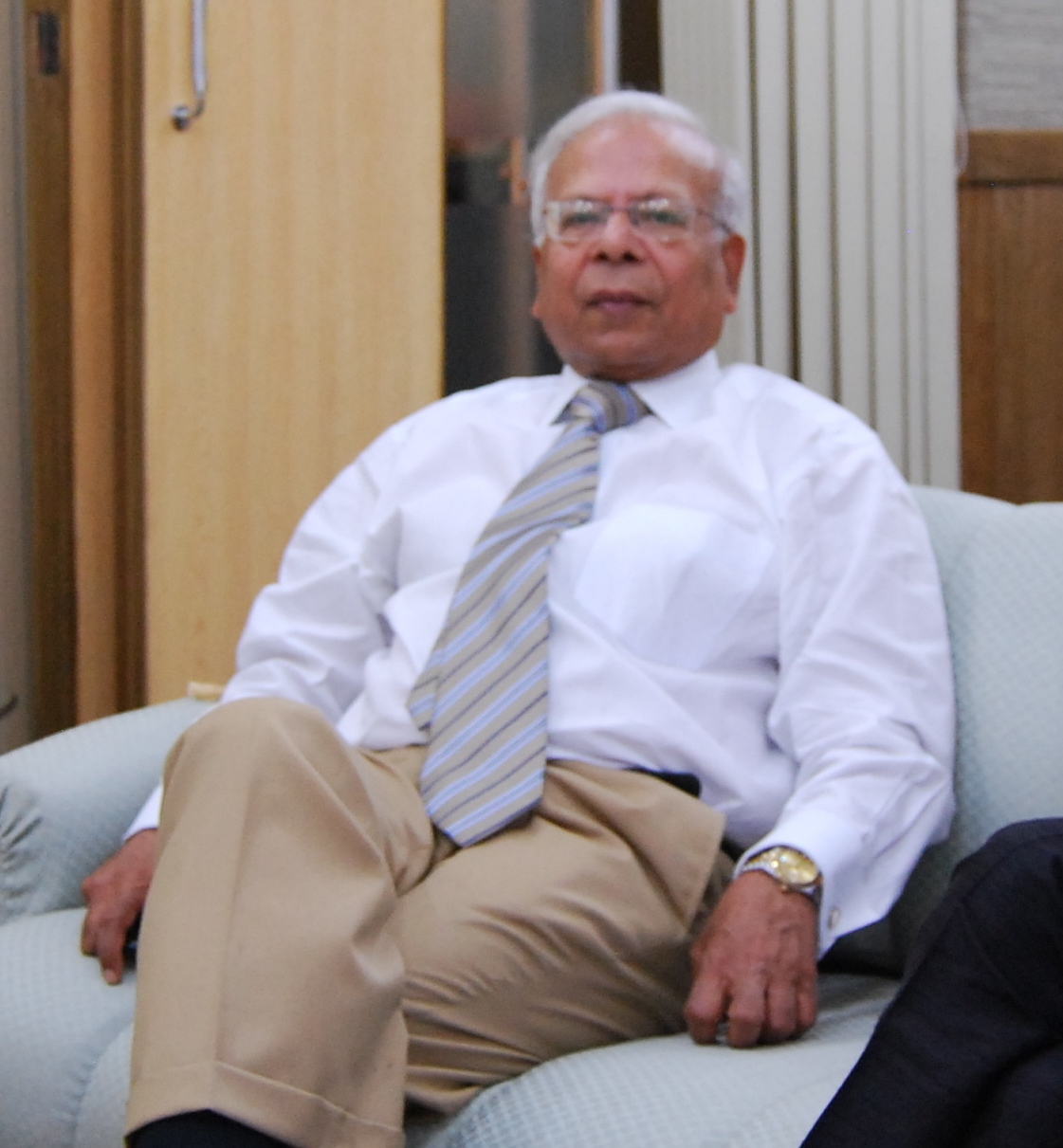

Advisor to the Prime Minister for Institutional Reforms & Austerity
- In office 27 August 2018 – 11 April 2022
- President: Arif Alvi; Mamnoon Hussain
- Prime Minister: Imran Khan

13th Governor of the State Bank of Pakistan
- In office 2 December 1999 – 1 December 2005
- Prime Minister: Zafarullah Khan Jamali; Shaukat Aziz
- Preceded by: Muhammad Yaqub
- Succeeded by: Shamshad Akhtar

Dean of IBA Karachi
- In office 2008–2016
- Governor: Ishrat-ul-Ibad Khan
- Succeeded by: Farrukh Iqbal

Personal details
- Born: 17 June 1941 (age 85) Allahabad, British India
- Education: University of Sindh; Williams College; Boston University

Ishrat Husain is a Pakistani civil servant who served as governor of the State Bank of Pakistan from 1999 to 2006, dean of the Institute of Business Administration (IBA) from 2008 to 2016, and advisor to the Prime Minister on Institutional Reforms and Austerity from 2018 to 2022. Husain is the Chairman of IBA's Centre for Excellence in Islamic Finance (CEIF), which has for objective the dissemination of knowledge in the field of Islamic finance.

== Early life and education ==
Ishrat Husain was born 1941 in Agra, British India. Husain's family relocated from Agra to Karachi in 1947 due to the partition of British India. He completed his early education in Karachi and later studied at the Government College Hyderabad. He earned a degree in zoology and chemistry before pursuing further studies in chemistry at the University of Sindh, where he also participated in political demonstrations, including protests against Ayub Khan's One Unit Scheme.

Husain developed an interest in development economics and sought further education through a government-sponsored program at Williams College in the United States. He received his M.A. in development economics in 1972 from the Williams College and his PhD from the Boston University in 1978.

== Career ==
After passing the civil service examination, Husain joined the Civil Services Academy in Lahore, graduating in 1964. His early assignments included administrative postings in various parts of Sindh, as well as in Chittagong (in what was then East Pakistan). During this period, he witnessed significant political changes, including the 1969 unrest against Ayub Khan and the secession of East Pakistan in 1971. He later served on the One Unit Dissolution Committee, dealing with a policy he had previously opposed as a student.

After completing his education at Williams College, Ishrat Husain returned to Pakistan and was appointed as the Deputy Secretary of the Finance Division in 1972, quickly advancing to Additional Secretary within a year. After earning his PhD in 1978, he was recruited by the World Bank, a transition influenced by his desire to engage more actively in global economic policy discussions during the Cold War. He worked initially as the country economist for Liberia.

By 1982, Husain had left the Pakistani civil service to focus on his career at the World Bank. His roles included World Bank Representative to Nigeria, head of the Debt and International Finance Division, Chief Economist for Africa, and later, Director for Poverty and Social Policy. He also served as the country director for the Central Asian republics, a position that solidified his critical perspective on socialist economic systems. His notable assignments included work in Ghana during a period of political instability under President Jerry Rawlings. Husain's approach in Ghana was shaped by his experiences in Pakistan, using these to inform his economic advice amidst the nation's internal conflicts.

In 1994, Husain became the chief economist for the Asia–Pacific region and between 1997 and 1999 headed the World Bank's operations in Central Asia. He ended his World Bank career in 1999, and was appointed the Governor of the State Bank of Pakistan and remained until December 2005.

In 2008, he was appointed the Dean of IBA Karachi, in 2015 he was awarded the Nishan-e-Imtiaz by President Mamnoon. He resigned as the dean of IBA in 2016, however remains the Professor Emeritus of the institute. During his tenure, IBA expanded from a solely business school to an interdisciplinary university. In 2016, Hussain joined the Woodrow Wilson Center as a resident policy fellow.

== Books ==
Year	Title	Role	Publisher	Description
1977	Rural-Urban Relations in Pakistan	Author	United Nations Centre for Regional Development	Study of rural–urban migration and development linkages in Pakistan.
1980	The Economy of Modern Sindh	Author	Oxford University Press	Comprehensive analysis of Sindh's provincial economy, including agriculture, industry, and public finance.
1984	Ghana: Policies and Programs for Adjustment	Author	World Bank	Examination of Ghana's economic adjustment and reform policies during the 1980s.
1989	Dealing with the Debt Crisis	Editor	World Bank	Edited volume on external debt challenges faced by developing countries.
1991	African External Finance	Editor	World Bank	Analysis of development finance and external financial flows to African economies.
1999	Political Economy of Reforms: A Case Study of Pakistan	Author	Pakistan Institute of Development Economics	Assessment of Pakistan's reform efforts and political constraints in the 1990s.
1999	Pakistan: The Economy of an Elitist State	Author	Oxford University Press	Influential work examining how elite interests shaped Pakistan's economic development since independence.
2002	Leading Issues Facing Pakistan Economy	Author	State Bank of Pakistan	Collection of speeches and papers on macroeconomic challenges and policy priorities.
2003	Economic Management in Pakistan 1999–2002	Author	Oxford University Press	Review of Pakistan's economic stabilization and reform policies in the early 2000s.
2004	Debt, Dollars and Deficits	Author	Vanguard Books	Discussion of Pakistan's fiscal imbalances, external debt, and macroeconomic policy issues.
2005	Key Issues in Pakistan's Economy	Author	State Bank of Pakistan	Essays on financial sector reform, globalization, and economic governance.
2018	Governing the Ungovernable: Institutional Reforms for Democratic Governance	Author	Oxford University Press (Pakistan)	Analysis of governance failures and proposed institutional reforms in Pakistan.
2023	Pakistan: Economic Challenges and Solutions	Author	Vanguard Books	Policy-oriented assessment of Pakistan's contemporary economic problems and reform options.

== Awards and achievements ==
- Jinnah Award (2005) for services to people as Governor of the State Bank of Pakistan.

Civic offices
Preceded by Muhammad Yaqub	Governor of the State Bank of Pakistan; 1999–2006	Succeeded by Shamshad Akhtar
