= Saving Face (2012 film) =

- Film poster
- Directed by: Sharmeen Obaid-Chinoy; Daniel Junge
- Produced by: Sharmeen Obaid-Chinoy; Sabiha Sumar
- Starring: Dr Mohammad Jawad
- Cinematography: Asad Faruqi; Aaron Kopp; Martina Radwan
- Edited by: Milkhaus
- Music by: Gunnard Doboze
- Production company: HBO Documentary Films
- Distributed by: HBO
- Release date: March 8, 2012
- Running time: 40 minutes
- Countries: United States; Pakistan
- Languages: English; Urdu

Saving Face is a 2012 documentary film directed by Sharmeen Obaid-Chinoy and Daniel Junge about acid attacks on women in Pakistan. The film won an Emmy Award and the 2012 Academy Award for Best Documentary Short Subject, making its director, Sharmeen Obaid-Chinoy, Pakistan's first Oscar winner. The film was inspired from the life of acid victim Fakhra Younus, who died by suicide in 2012.

== Synopsis ==
Saving Face features two women attacked by acid and their struggle for justice and healing. It follows London-based Pakistani plastic surgeon Dr. Mohammad Jawad as he journeys to Pakistan to perform reconstructive surgery on survivors of acid violence. Saving Face broaches the subject of the under-reporting of acid violence against women due to cultural and structural inequalities towards women from Pakistani men. The Acid Survivors Foundation of Pakistan, which is featured in the film, had documented more than 100 acid attacks a year in Pakistan but estimates far more due to lack of reporting.

Obaid-Chinoy has stated that the film is "a positive story about Pakistan on two accounts: firstly, it portrays how a Pakistani-British doctor comes to treat them and it also discusses, in great depth, the parliament’s decision to pass a bill on acid violence". She has said that the film assisted in the trial and conviction of one of the perpetrators of acid violence.

== Production ==
Obaid-Chinoy chose the subject of acid violence after being contacted by Junge, who had already filmed portions of the documentary prior to their discussion. Obaid-Chinoy commented to The Wall Street Journal that "The subject matter immediately appealed to me: Acid violence impacts women in southern Punjab and changes the lives of hundreds of women each year." The documenters initially had some difficulty contacting and gaining the trust of the survivors in the film as well as connecting with the local community, but stated that "once we had spent a considerable amount of time on the ground and had established relationships, we did not experience any further obstacles."

== Controversy ==
Obaid-Chinoy has faced criticism over allegations that she promised acid victim Rukhsana assistance in the form of money, a new home, and plastic surgery in return for participating in the film. Rukhsana filed a lawsuit against Obaid-Chinoy that stated that the director made her sign blank documents and that the film resulted in her husband evicting her from her home and her family ceasing communication with her. Obaid-Chinoy refuted the claims, replying that she did not promise Rukhsana any assistance and that Rukhsana had turned down offers to have Jawad operate upon her. The Acid Survivors Foundation and Rukhsana filed a civil suit to keep Saving Face from being shown in Pakistan, to which Obaid-Chinoy agreed to honor despite having airing rights.

== Awards and nominations ==
Year	Award-giving body	Award	Result
2012	Academy Award	Academy Award for Best Documentary (Short Subject)	Won
2012	Emmy Award	Best Documentary	Won
2012	Emmy Award	Outstanding Editing: Documentary and Long Form	Won
2012	Emmy Award	Outstanding Science and Technology Programming	Nominated
2012	Emmy Award	Outstanding Cinematography Documentary and Long Form	Nominated
2012	Emmy Award	Outstanding Research	Nominated

== See also ==
- Depilex Smileagain Foundation
