= Abdul Hafeez Kardar =

Pakistani cricketer and politician

- A.H. Kardar

Personal information
- Full name: Abdul Hafeez Kardar
- Born: 17 January 1925; Lahore, Punjab, British India
- Died: 21 April 1996 (aged 71); Islamabad, Pakistan
- Batting: Left-handed
- Bowling: Slow left arm orthodox
- Relatives: Zulfiqar Ahmed (brother-in-law); Alec Hastilow (father-in-law); Shahid Kardar (son)

International information
- National sides: India (1946); Pakistan (1952–1958)
- Test debut (cap 29/7): 22 June 1946; India v England
- Last Test: 26 March 1958; Pakistan v West Indies

Domestic team information
- Years: Team
- 1943–1945: Northern India
- 1944: Muslims
- 1947–1949: Oxford University
- 1948–1950: Warwickshire
- 1953–1954: Combined Services

Career statistics
Competition	Test	First-class
Matches	26	174
Runs scored	927	6,832
Batting average	23.76	29.83
100s/50s	0/5	8/32
Top score	93	173
Balls bowled	2,712	24,256
Wickets	21	344
Bowling average	45.42	24.55
5 wickets in innings	0	19
10 wickets in match	0	4
Best bowling	3/35	7/25
Catches/stumpings	16/–	110/–
- Source: CricketArchive, 3 December 2008

Abdul Hafeez Kardar PP, HI (Urdu: عبد الحفیظ کاردار) (17 January 1925 – 21 April 1996) was a Pakistani cricketer, politician, and diplomat. He was the first captain of the Pakistan cricket team and one of only three players to have played Test cricket for both India and Pakistan. Known as "The Skipper," Kardar led the Pakistan cricket team in its first 23 Test matches, spanning from 1952 to 1958, and later became the nation's foremost cricket administrator.

Widely regarded as the father figure of Pakistan cricket, Kardar received the Pride of Performance Award from the Government of Pakistan in 1958. In addition to his cricketing achievements, he served as a member of the Provincial Assembly of the Punjab and held the position of Punjab Minister for Food under the Bhutto government.

== Early career ==
Kardar was born in 1925 into a prominent Kardar Arain family in Lahore, Punjab. He was educated at Islamia College, Lahore, and University College, Oxford. Kardar played domestic cricket for various teams, including Oxford University, Northern India, and Muslims. He was one of the few players of his generation to have represented India in Tests against England before the partition and, following the independence of India and Pakistan, went on to represent Pakistan.

In 1952–53, Kardar was appointed captain of the Pakistan team for its first official Test series, a tour of India. Leading his team against Lala Amarnath's Indian team, Kardar's men faced defeats in Delhi and Bombay, with India winning the series. However, Pakistan secured its first-ever Test victory in the second match, held in Lucknow.

Kardar was a left-handed batsman and a slow left-arm orthodox spin bowler. In first-class cricket, he scored 6,832 runs at an average of 29.83 and took 344 wickets at an average of 24.55. He represented the Pakistan team from 1948 to 1952, during the years before Pakistan was granted Test status. Kardar also played for Warwickshire and Pakistan Services in domestic cricket.

== Pakistan's captain ==
Kardar captained Pakistan against all the Test-playing nations of his time, achieving the remarkable distinction of leading his team to victory against each of them—a notable accomplishment for a newly established cricketing nation. One of his most famous victories was the series-levelling win against England at The Oval in 1954. Another historic achievement came in 1957 when Pakistan secured their first Test victory against Australia, in Karachi.

Despite Kardar's aggressive, motivated, and confident leadership, Pakistan's team was still immature, inexperienced, and developing their cricketing skills, which limited their ability to win series consistently. The attitude of the players faced criticism during the Indian cricket team's first tour of Pakistan in 1954–55, where all five Tests ended in draws. Political tensions and the bloody legacy of independence created an atmosphere where both teams feared losing, hindering competitive cricket.

Under Kardar's captaincy, Pakistan played a total of 23 Tests, winning six, losing six, and drawing eleven. Although his leadership style was often dictatorial, and he was quick to anger—especially at criticism—Kardar was a visionary who advocated for the use of neutral umpires in cricket. Kardar retired from international Test cricket in 1958.

== Later career ==
Kardar was a strong supporter of Mohammad Ali Jinnah and a firm believer in the idea of Muslim glory in India. He ventured into politics and served as the president of the Pakistan Cricket Board (PCB) from 1972 to 1977. His tenure was notable for advocating increased representation of Asian and African cricketing nations within the International Cricket Council (ICC). However, he was forced to resign in 1977 following an embarrassing pay dispute with the players.

In addition to his cricketing and administrative roles, Kardar was actively involved in charitable and social development causes. In the final years of his life, he served as Pakistan's ambassador to Switzerland. He died in his hometown of Lahore in 1996.

Kardar is widely credited with popularizing cricket among the Pakistani people, mentoring some of the nation's greatest cricketers and nurturing young talent. His stewardship of the Pakistan team and the PCB during its formative years helped establish a culture of pride and professionalism in the sport. He was also elected to the Provincial Assembly of Punjab in 1970 on a Pakistan Peoples Party (PPP) ticket and served in the provincial cabinet as a minister.

== Private life ==
Kardar married twice. He married Shahzadi, the sister of Pakistani cricketer Zulfiqar Ahmed, in 1951. His second was to Helen Hastilow, the daughter of Alec Hastilow, chairman of Warwickshire County Cricket Club, in 1954. He had at least one son, Shahid Hafeez Kardar, who is a prominent economist.

== Tribute ==
In 2019, Abdul Hafeez Kardar was honored with a Google Doodle on what would have been his 94th birthday.

== Awards and recognition ==
Kardar received the Pride of Performance Award in 1958 from the President of Pakistan. In 2012, he was posthumously awarded the Hilal-i-Imtiaz in recognition of his contributions to Pakistan's cricket.

That same year, he was also awarded the Sitara-e-Imtiaz, Pakistan's third-highest civilian award, for his outstanding contributions to the country's cricket team.

== Books by A.H. Kardar ==
- Inaugural Test Matches (1954)
- Test Status on Trial (1954)
- Green Shadows (1958)
- People's Commitment (1971)
- The Cricket Conspiracy (1977)
- Is the Economic Future of Our Youth Become? (1985)
- Bangladesh: The Price of Political Failure (1985)
- Memoirs of an All-rounder (1987)
- Pakistan's Soldiers of Fortune (1988)
- An Ambassador's Diary (1994)
- Failed Expectations (1995)

== See also ==
- List of cricketers who have played for more than one international team

Preceded by Position Established	Pakistan Cricket Captain; 1952–1958	Succeeded by Fazal Mahmood
