= Habib Bank AG Zurich =

Swiss multinational commercial bank

- Type: Private
- Industry: Financial services
- Founded: 25 August 1967; 59 years ago
- Headquarters: Zürich, Switzerland
- Key people: Muhammad H. Habib (Member of the Board of Directors); Mohamedali R. Habib (Group CEO)
- Products: Loans; Checking; Savings; Investments; Credit Cards; Letter of credit
- Owner: Mohamedali Habib Family
- Number of employees: ~7,000
- Parent: Gefan Finanz AG
- Subsidiaries: HABIBMETRO
- Website: www.habibbank.com

Habib Bank AG Zurich is a privately owned bank founded in 1967 in Zurich, Switzerland, by Hyder Mohamedali Habib, son of the Bank’s patriarch, Mohamedali Habib. The Bank’s origins go back to 1941 when Mohamedali Habib established the first Habib family bank, which laid the foundation for Habib Bank AG Zurich. The Bank remains to this day in the hands and under the leadership of Mohamedali Habib's descendants.

Muhammad H. Habib serves as a Member of the Board of Directors, while Mohamedali R. Habib is the Group CEO. Dr. Andreas Länzlinger was elected to the Bank’s Board of Directors in 2008 and has been Chairman of the Board since 2013.

Habib Bank AG Zurich’s head office is located in Zurich, with branch operations in Kenya and the United Arab Emirates (UAE), and subsidiaries in Canada, Hong Kong SAR, Pakistan, South Africa, and the United Kingdom (UK). The Bank also has representative offices in Bangladesh, China, Hong Kong, Pakistan, and Türkiye.

As of 31 December 2024, the Bank employed a total of 7,904 people in 587 offices.

== Members of the Board of Directors ==
=== Dr. Andreas Länzlinger ===
Chairman since 2013, Board of Directors of Habib Bank AG Zurich since 2008.

=== Roland Müller-Ineichen ===
Chairman of the Audit Committee, Board member since 2018.

=== Muhammad H. Habib ===
Member of the Board of Directors.

=== Andrea Rieger ===
Member of the Audit and Risk & Control Committees.

=== Michael Schneebeli ===
Chair of the Risk & Control Committee, Board member since 2021.

== Members of General Management ==
=== Mohamedali R. Habib ===
Group Chief Executive Officer since 2016 and Chairman of the Board of Directors at HABIBMETRO since 2015.

=== Mohsin Ali Nathani ===
Member of General Management and Head of Asian Markets and Canada since June 2024.

=== Ertugrul Tüfekci ===
Member of General Management since February 2025, and Head of Shared Services since May 2025.

=== Arif Usmani ===
Member of General Management and Group Chief Risk Officer since 2023.

== Global Network ==
Branches, Subsidiaries and Representative Offices

- Switzerland – Head Office
- Kenya – 5 Branches
- UAE – 8 Branches, 1 Subsidiary, DIFC Branch
- Canada – 3 Branches
- Hong Kong – 2 Branches, 1 Rep Office
- Pakistan – 500+ Branches, Rep Office
- South Africa – 8 Branches
- United Kingdom – 8 Branches
- Bangladesh – Rep Office – Dhaka
- China – Rep Office – Shanghai
- Türkiye – Rep Office – Istanbul

== Key Services / Products ==
- Commercial Banking: Banking solutions for businesses, including loans, payment solutions, and account management.
- Trade Finance: Trade financing services for businesses and financial institutions worldwide.
- Personal Banking: Personal banking solutions for individual clients.
- Financial Institutions/Correspondent Banking: Global correspondent-banking services for international trade requirements.
- Wealth Management: Investment, asset and wealth management services for clients.
- Islamic Banking: Shariah-compliant financial solutions under Global Islamic Banking brand ‘Sirat’. ‘Sirat’ is available currently in 5 countries within the Habib Bank AG Zurich network.

== Awards and Recognitions ==
1. Habib Bank AG Zurich was awarded the Best Zurich-Based Private Bank at WealthBriefing Swiss Awards – 2025
2. Habib Bank AG Zurich was featured in The Banker magazine’s prestigious Top 1000 World Banks list in 2024
3. HABIBMETRO received Best Bank for Islamic Conversion Strategy in Pakistan at Islamic Retail Banking Awards - 2024
4. HABIBMETRO received Domestic Cash Management Bank of the Year - Pakistan 2024 at Asian Banking & Finance Awards
5. Habib Bank AG Zurich - Kenya received Digital Banker of the Year at Africa Fintech Forum – 2024
6. Habib Bank Zurich plc received Most Innovative Islamic Bank in the UK and HBZ received IFN Egypt Deal of the Year at the IFN Awards in 2024
7. Habib Bank AG Zurich received Client Initiative Award at WealthBriefing Swiss Awards – 2024
8. HABIBMETRO received Top 25 Companies Award at Pakistan Stock Exchange – 2023
9. Habib Bank Zurich plc received Best SME Bank, Best Customer Service Bank, and Best Islamic Bank by World Economic Magazine - 2024

== Notable Events ==
- 50 Years in the UAE
- 50 Years in the UK
- 30 Years in South Africa
- 25 Years in Canada

== Subsidiaries ==
=== Canada ===
Habib Canadian Bank: 3 Branches

=== Hong Kong ===
2 Branches & Representative Office

=== Pakistan ===
HABIBMETRO: 500+ Branches & Representative Office

=== South Africa ===
HBZ Bank Limited: 8 Branches

=== UK ===
Habib Bank Zurich Plc: 8 Branches

== Philanthropy ==
=== Pakistan ===
- Habib University, Pakistan
- IDA Rieu School
- Indus Hospital, Pakistan
- KDSP
- Make-a-wish foundation
- SIUT Trust, Pakistan
- Patient Aids Foundation, Pakistan

=== South Africa ===
- Dawnridge Primary School
- Emafezini Primary School
- Fernham Primary School
- Mashaka Primary School, South Africa
- Northlen Primary School
- Sultan Bahu Centre
- Sunfield Home School, South Africa

=== Switzerland ===
- Foodsharing Zurich
- Swiss Red Cross, Switzerland
- TCF School
- Turkish Red Crescent Society, Switzerland
- Zharity

=== Kenya ===
- Jikos and Mwikos Foundation
- Pwani One Shilling Foundation
- Sukuma Twende Trust, Kenya
- UN Refugee Agency, Kenya

=== Canada ===
- Max Scholarship Fund, Canada
- International Development and Relief Fund, Canada
- Operation Smile Canada
- Riverwood Conservancy

=== Hong Kong ===
- City University, Hong Kong
- Green Power Hike
- HandsOn Hong Kong
- THE ONE Humanitarian Award, Hong Kong

=== UK ===
- Adab Festival (Pakistan Literature Festival), London, United Kingdom
- Havillah Children’s Home, Mwiki
- Ministry of Stories, UK
- Thames21
- University of Westminster

=== UAE ===
- Beit Al Khair Society
- Emirates Down Syndrome Association (EDSA)
- Pakistan Association Dubai, UAE
- Rashid Centre for People of Determination

== ESG Initiatives ==
In 2023, 2024, and 2025, Habib Bank AG Zurich released its ESG reports outlining its sustainability initiatives and activities.

== See also ==
- House of Habib
