= List of governors of the State Bank of Pakistan =

This is a list of the governors of the State Bank of Pakistan, which is the central bank of Pakistan.

== List of governors ==
No	Governor	Took office	Left office	Time in office
1	Zahid Hussain	10 June 1948	19 July 1953	5 years, 40 days
2	Abdul Qadir	20 July 1953	19 July 1960	7 years
3	Shujaat Ali Hasnie	20 July 1960	19 July 1967	7 years
4	Mahbubur Raschid	20 July 1967	1 July 1971	3 years, 347 days
5	Shahkurullah Durrani	1 July 1971	22 December 1971	174 days
6	Ghulam Ishaq Khan	22 December 1971	30 November 1975	3 years, 344 days
7	S. Osman Ali	1 December 1975	1 July 1978	2 years, 213 days
8	Aftab Ghulam Nabi Kazi	15 July 1978	9 July 1986	7 years, 359 days
9	Vasim Aon Jafarey	10 July 1986	16 August 1988	2 years, 38 days
10	Imtiaz Alam Hanfi	17 August 1988	2 September 1989	381 days (first term)
11	Kassim Parekh	5 September 1989	30 August 1990	359 days
-	Imtiaz Alam Hanfi	1 September 1990	30 June 1993	2 years, 303 days (second term)
12	Muhammad Yaqub	25 July 1993	25 November 1999	6 years, 124 days
13	Ishrat Husain	2 December 1999	1 December 2005	6 years
14	Shamshad Akhtar	2 December 2006	1 January 2009	2 years, 31 days
15	Salim Raza	1 February 2009	2 June 2010	1 year, 121 days
16	Shahid Hafeez Kardar	8 September 2010	13 July 2011	309 days
17	Yaseen Anwar	19 October 2011	31 January 2014	2 years, 104 days
18	Ashraf Mahmood Wathra	29 April 2014	28 April 2017	3 years
19	Tariq Bajwa	7 July 2017	3 May 2019	1 year, 206 days
21	Reza Baqir	4 May 2019	4 May 2022	3 years
22	Murtaza Syed	6 May 2022	18 Aug 2022	104 days
23	Jameel Ahmed	19 Aug 2022	Incumbent	-

== See also ==
- State Bank of Pakistan
- Planning Commission (Pakistan)
- Economy of Pakistan
