= Masood ul-Mulk =

Pakistani expert on humanitarian aid

- Born: 1 May 1956 (age 69)
- Occupation: CEO of the Sarhad Rural Support Programme
- Known for: Humanitarian Work; Social Development; Poverty Reduction; Participatory Development; Rural Development
- Board member of: AKH Resource Center; RSPN; National Committee of IUCN; Langlands School; USEFP; Micro Finance Network (PK); INAFI Asia and others

Masood ul-Mulk TI (Urdu: مسود الملک) is a Pakistani expert on humanitarian aid and a development practitioner. He is the CEO of SRSP the largest NGO working to alleviate poverty in North-West Pakistan.

== Background and education ==
Masood is from Chitral, Khyber Pakhtunkhwa. He is the son of Shahzada Khush Ahmed ul-Mulk and the grandson of His Highness Sir Shuja ul-Mulk, the former Mehtar (Ruler) of the Princely State of Chitral. Masood is the son in law of veteran politician Shahzada Mohiuddin.

Masood pursued academic studies and professional courses from Lawrence College, Wye College, University of York, American University, University of Colorado Boulder the World Bank and IMF, Washington. He has also been a Hubert Humphrey Fellow at the Lyndon B. Johnson School of Public Affairs at the University of Texas at Austin, US. In 1996 a letters patent was issued by the Governor of Texas George W. Bush declaring Masood an Honorary Texan.

== Career ==
Masood has served in the development field for over 30 years. While serving as the Regional Programme Manager for the Aga Khan Rural Support Programme in Chitral his developmental work for the area manifested in social organization, women's development, natural resource management, physical infrastructure development, human resource development, enterprise promotion, and provision of credit and savings services. He also introduced a micro-hydro power system that supplied electricity to about 175,000 people in over 110 villages, and won the organisation an Ashden Award for Sustainable Energy (2004). The power house unit's supplied electricity to inaccessible high altitude valleys in the Hindu Kush where the Water and Power Development Authority would take another 50 years to put the basic infrastructure in place.

Since 2001, Masood has been leading the Sarhad Rural Support Programme, the organisation set up by Nishan-e-Imtiaz recipient Shoaib Sultan Khan. SRSP is part of the Rural Support Programmes (RSP's), which are working with 32 million people across the country. Masood led SRSP’s relief and reconstruction work following the 2005 earthquake, 2009 Swat valley conflict and 2010 floods, and worked closely with civil and military authorities. Given the technical difficulties and social resistance faced by international non-governmental organization's and multilateral organisations, their ability to deliver on ground was restricted, more so after September 11 attacks. Thus making the dispensation of foreign aid difficult. Hence a high proportion of the international developmental, humanitarian and relief aid to Khyber Pakhtunkhwa had to flow through SRSP. Masood has combined innovative techniques with aboriginal ones to make sure that the aid reaches those in need. He endorses the view that at times of austerity and destabilizing socio-economic and political conditions, a holistic approach to international development is required. At the core of his approach is the compelling idea that downward accountability is as important as upward accountability. He believes that amongst development approaches undertaken in developing countries, the most successful involve targeting the population as stakeholders in the development initiative.

Following the earthquake of 2005 Masood oversaw the relief work of SRSP followed by its reconstruction of 62,000 houses. The project was funded by the Pakistan Poverty Alleviation Fund and continues to be one of the largest of its kind anywhere in the world.

He was part of the five-member United Nations, government and humanitarian team that led the 2009 United Nations Humanitarian Appeal for Internally Displaced Persons. While doing so he also headed SRSP's humanitarian assistance, which reached out to 3.5 million IDP's, through systematic provision of transportation, accommodation, food items and medical services. Masood was invited to represent the Pakistani Civil Society in 2009 as one of the speakers at the Presidency where the President and Prime Minister of Pakistan had organised a function to honour those who had worked for the IDPs. He was among a select gathering of international donors, NGO's and civil society representatives who were honoured by the President for their efforts and contributions.

During the 2010 floods Masood lead SRSP’s humanitarian and relief assistance. The immediate reflexive actions were followed by more protracted and deliberate efforts to rebuild community infrastructure throughout Khyber Pakhtunkhwa, where they had been damaged by the flood's.

In 2015 under Masood’s care, SRSP won the Ashden Award for increasing energy access, for its work with communities living in one of the world’s most remote, dangerous and inhospitable environments. The Sarhad Rural Support Programme had constructed 189 village micro-hydro schemes and brought inexpensive, clean, sustainable and renewable energy to around 365,000 people in the area, spread over hundreds of kilometre's. With the aim of crossing the 1 million figure.

== Projects overseen ==
As the Chief Executive of SRSP Masood has over the years presided over many locally and internationally funded projects including:

- Bacha Khan Poverty Alleviation Programme
- Programme for Economic Advancement and Community Empowerment
- Community Driven Local Development
- People’s Primary Healthcare Initiative
- Earthquake Relief and Rehabilitation Project
- Access to Justice Initiatives
- Federally Administered Tribal Areas Programmes

== Miscellaneous ==
In his private capacity Masood has been a consultant for Department for International Development, Sustainable Development Commission, United Nations Development Programme, Food and Agriculture Organization, International Fund for Agricultural Development, International Institute for Environment and Development and International Centre for Integrated Mountain Development.

Masood has lectured at various forums including, Lahore University of Management Sciences, the Civil Services Academy of Pakistan Lahore as well as several universities across Canada. He has also delivered lectures at the University of Cambridge, The Pakistan Society in London, WANA forum in Jordan, and European Environment Foundation in Germany.

== Directorships ==
Masood has served on the boards of various organisations including:

- AKH Resource Center
- Rural Support Programme Network
- The United States Education Foundation in Pakistan
- Provincial Steering Committees of Essential Institutional Reform Project of Government of NWFP
- Steering Committee of Tropical Forestry Project of the United Nations Development Programme (2002 to 2006)
- National Committee of the International Union for Conservation of Nature
- Pakistan Micro Finance Network (2001 to 2007)
- Langlands School and College
- International Network of Alternative Financial Institutions (INAFI Asia)

== Publications ==
- Personalising Development: Policies, Processes and Institutions for Sustainable Rural Livelihoods
- The Inter-Group Resource Book-FAO
- Ending Poverty in South Asia: Ideas that Work
- Sustainable Mountain Agriculture. 2. Strategies and Innovative Approaches
- Pakistan Horizon, Volume 59, Issues 3–4
- Lessons on Sustaining Communities and Forests from The Small Grants Programme for Operations to Promote Tropical Forests
- Working in Uncertain, Complex and Fragile Environments
- A Microcosm of Farmers Strategies in Chitral
- State, Society and the Environment in South Asia
