= Shoaib Sultan Khan =

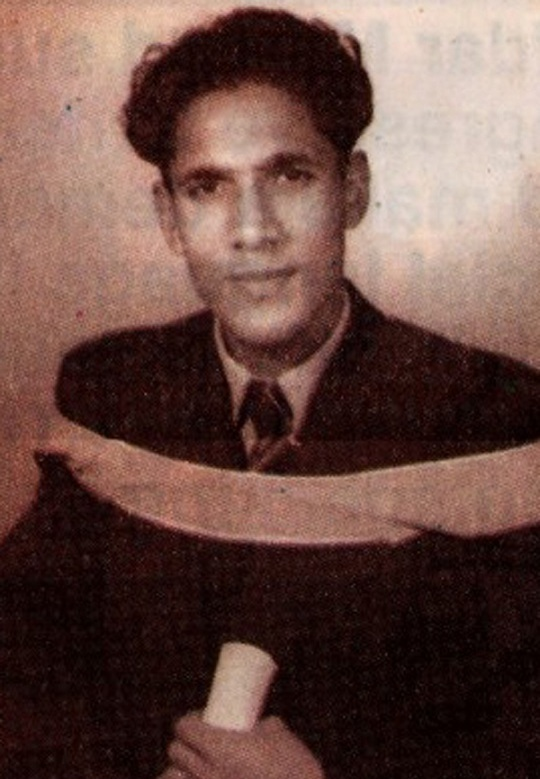
- Pioneers of rural development programmes in Pakistan
- Born: 11 July 1933 (age 93); Moradabad, British India
- Education: Master of Arts in English, Bachelor of Law degree
- Occupation: Development practitioner
- Known for: Social development Poverty reduction Participatory development
- Notable work: Founder of Rural Support Programmes in Pakistan
- Spouse: Mussarat Rahim
- Children: Roohi, Afshan, Falaknaz, and Shelley
- Parent(s): Mohammad Nasim Khan and Husna
- Relatives: Sultan Ahmad Beg (Grandfather)
- Awards: Global 500 Roll of Honour; Sitara-i-Imtiaz; Ramon Magsaysay Award; World Conservation Medal Sitara-e-Eisaar; Hilal-i-Imtiaz; Rotary International Gold Medal

Shoaib Sultan Khan NI (born 11 July 1933) is one of the pioneers of rural development programmes in Pakistan. As a CSP Officer, he worked with the Government of Pakistan for 25 years, later on he served Geneva based Aga Khan Foundation for 12 years, then UNICEF and UNDP for 14 years. Since his retirement, he has been involved with the Rural Support Programmes (RSPs) of Pakistan full-time, on voluntary basis. Today, the Rural Support Programmes have helped form 297,000 community organisations in 110 districts including two Federally Administered Tribal Areas of Pakistan.

He has received the United Nations Environment Programme Global 500 Award in 1989, the Sitara-i-Imtiaz in 1990, the Ramon Magsaysay Award in 1992, the WWF Duke of Edinburgh Conservation Award in 1994, "Man of the Year" Rotary International (Pakistan) Gold Medal in 2005, Sitara-e-Eisaar and Hilal-i-Imtiaz by the President of Pakistan in 2007. In 2009 he was elected as Senior Ashoka Fellow. He has written numerous research papers and books.

In 2009, he was nominated for the Nobel Peace Prize for "Unleashing the power and potential of the poor". In 2019 he was awarded Nishan-e-Imtiaz by the President of Pakistan.

== Biography ==
Shoaib Sultan Khan was born on 11 July 1933 in Moradabad, British India; a town now in Uttar Pradesh, India. His grandfather, Sultan Ahmad Beg, had won a coveted position in the state civil service of United Provinces, in the days of the British Raj. He maintained a large household that embraced his children and grandchildren.

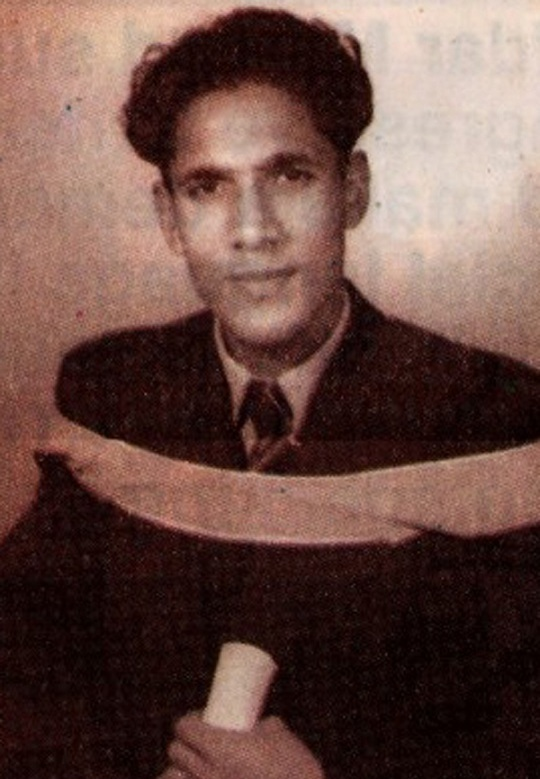
At the time of Graduation from Lucknow University

Shoaib obtained his Master of Arts degree in English from Lucknow University and subsequently completed a Public Administration Course at the University of Cambridge. He has a Bachelor of Laws degree from Peshawar University, in addition to which he has also done academic work at Birmingham University and at Queen Elizabeth House, Oxford.

== Career ==
He started his career as a lecturer in 1953, but joined the Civil Service of Pakistan in 1955 and remained in it till 1978. Eventually rising through the posts of Deputy Director of Civil Service Academy, Deputy Commissioner Kohat and Peshawar, Commissioner of Karachi Division, Secretary Department of Health, Education and Social Welfare in the Government of North West Frontier Province and Director for the Pakistan Academy of Rural Development.

His career in rural development started in 1959 when he came in contact with Dr. Akhter Hameed Khan. Dr. Khan asked him to follow three simple principles used in Germany by Friedrich Wilhelm Raiffeisen – get the oppressed peasants to organize and identify a leadership and then acquire the capacity to acquire capital, have savings and upgrade human skills. That conceptual package revolutionized Germany. Even the Grameen Bank and the Bangladesh Rural Advancement Committee (now just BRAC) came out of this simple concept. Under Dr. Khan's guidance he established the Daudzai Pilot Project of the Integrated Rural Development Programme in 1972 on the pattern of Comilla Project. In 1978, he was deputed to Nagoya, Japan, as a consultant to the United Nations Center for Regional Development. As UNICEF consultant, he worked in Sri Lanka during 1979 and 1982 on the Mahaweli Ganga Development Project.

== Non-government Programmes ==
In December 1982, the Aga Khan Foundation asked him to head the newly founded Aga Khan Rural Support Programme (AKRSP), a citizen sector organisation that targets poverty-stricken villages primarily in northern Pakistan (Gilgit-Baltistan and Chitral) and engages their inhabitants in development programmes. AKRSP was established with strong personal interest of His Highness the Aga Khan in its success. The same year Shoaib became the first and founding general manager of the newly established NGO. At the outset, Shoaib obtained commitment from the Aga Khan Foundation for long-term financial support of the program. The AKRSP model developed after trial and error in collaboration with 100,000 mountain farmers. This model subverted the conventional model of social development, which assumed that either central government or outside agencies would lift people out of poverty. And involved the local communities in the development initiative through an approach that was participatory rather than bureaucratic.

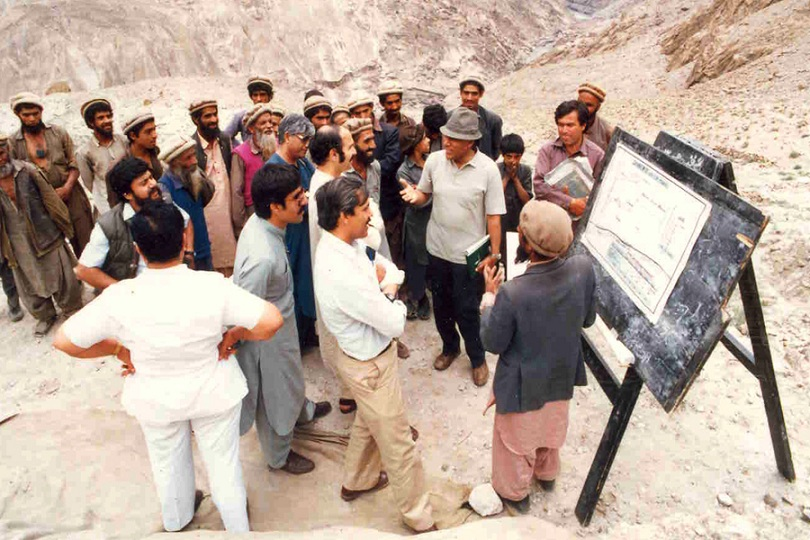
Dialogue with the community in the northern areas of Pakistan

The success of the AKRSP model was replicated in many countries and at the request of the United Nations Development Programme, he undertook South Asian Poverty Alleviation programme (SAPAP), setting up demonstration plots on its pattern in India, Maldives, Bangladesh, Nepal and Sri Lanka. Islamabad also started the National Rural Support Programme (NRSP) and the provincial programmes replicating the same model.

By the mid 1980s Shoaib had been successful in convincing Sartaj Aziz to lobby to set up the National Rural Support Programme. In 1987 Chief Minister of N.W.F.P Arbab Jehangir invited Shoaib Sultan to start the Sarhad Rural Support Programme. In 1993 Prime Minister Nawaz Sharif impressed with Shoaib Sultans international recognition donated 500 million rupees to the National Rural Support Programme. During the 1990s, when Sartaj Aziz was Finance Minister, Shoaibs interaction with him resulted in the establishment of the Pakistan Poverty Alleviation Fund. In 1997 he influenced Chief Minister of Punjab Shehbaz Sharif to commit 500 million rupees for the Punjab Rural Support Programme.

When Shoaib came to India in 1994 as part of the UNDP project, Prime Minister P.V. Narasimha Rao asked him to test the project in Andhra Pradesh, where it took off in three districts — Kurnool, Anantapur and Mehboobnagar. At the end of the U.N pilot, on Shoaibs suggestion, Mr. Chandrababu Naidu, then Andhra Pradesh Chief Minister, agreed to continue it.

In this context, India launched a national programme called National Rural Livelihood Mission based on the SAPAP principles of development to benefit over 300 million poor. At the behest of Rahul Gandhi, Shoaib started a project in Rajiv Gandhi Mahila Vikas Pariyojana (RGMVP) in his constituency in Uttar Pradesh on the same principles which have proven that the model can help marginalised people overcome obstacles even in the most hierarchical social structural settings. Similarly in Andhra Pradesh, the programme was started by the World Bank funding and it reached 50 million people and transformed their lives. In 2011, Sonia Gandhi directed the Indian Ministry of Rural Development to launch the National Rural Livelihood Mission (NRLM) on the pattern of the Andhra experience to mobilise 70 million households across the country by 2017. The Federal Government of India has now made it part of their central policy under the National Rural Livelihood Mission and 13 other states are following the Andhra Pradesh model.

India’s Rural Development Ministry, has admitted that in India, the state has internalised that rights-based development was not a charity, but a right. Based on the model advocated by Shoaib, the Government of India annually allocates Indian Rs 270 billion for rural support programmes through community support organisations.

== Positions ==
Shoaib has served on the board of numerous organisations including:

1. Rural Support Programmes Network (Chairman)
2. National Rural Support Programme
3. Ghazi Barotha Tarqiati Idara (GBTI)
4. Sindh Rural Support Organization
5. Aga Khan Rural Support Programme
6. Institute of Rural Management
7. Sarhad Rural Support Programme
8. Punjab Rural Support Programme
9. Balochistan Rural Support Programme
10. International Centre for Integrated Mountain Development
11. Akhter Hameed Khan Foundation (AHKF) https://ahk-foundation.org/

He is also a Member of the Advisory Group of the World Bank sponsored Community Development Carbon Fund, Member of the Government of Pakistan Advisory Committee on Millennium Development Goals and Chairman of the Pakistan Government's Vision 2030 Group on Just Society.

== Awards and honours ==
In recognition of his services, he has been awarded the United Nations Environment Programme Global 500 Award in 1989, Sitara-i-Imtiaz by the President of Pakistan in 1990, the Ramon Magsaysay Award by the President of Philippines in 1992 and the World Conservation Medal by the Duke of Edinburgh Prince Philip in 1994, the Rotary International (Pakistan) awarded Man of the Year 2005 Gold Medal in 2006, Sitara Eisaar for earthquake work and Hilal-i-Imtiaz on Pakistan Day in 2006 by the President of Pakistan. In 2009 he was elected as Senior Ashoka Fellow.

The list of nominees for the annual Nobel Peace Prize has always been a closely guarded secret over the last 50 years, with just a few names leaked to the public. One such nominee whose name slipped the net is Shoaib Sultan Khan. He was nominated for the Nobel Peace Prize in 2009 for "unleashing the power and potential of the poor". The Prize eventually went to President Obama, which raised more than a few eyebrows, considering the nomination came just 12 days after he took office. The New York Times called the decision a "stunning surprise", while less generous spectators accused the Nobel Committee of having political motivations. With President Obama confessing to Stephen Colbert on The Late Show that he did not know why he won the Nobel Prize.

In March 2019, he was nominated to be a recipient of Nishan-i-Imtiaz, the highest civilian honour of Pakistan. On 23 March 2019, Government of Pakistan awarded him the Nishan-i-Imtiaz. In March 2019, he was nominated to be a recipient of Nishan-i-Imtiaz, the highest civilian honour of Pakistan. On 23 March 2019, Government of Pakistan awarded him the Nishan-i-Imtiaz.

== Publications ==
- The Aga Khan Rural Support Programme – A Journey Through Grassroots Development
- Rural Change in the Third World: Pakistan and the Aga Khan Rural Support Program
- Andhra Pradesh revisited and meetings at Delhi
- NRSP Bank
- Advocacy and replication of AKRSP strategy
- The Aga Khan Rural Support Programme, Gilgit
- Asian Seminar on Community Participation organized by EDI, World Bank, IFAD, Asian and Pacific Centre for Development
- Discussion Between MG and Dr. Akhter Hameed Khan
- Dr. Akhter Hameed Khan Memorial Lecture
- Andhra really shining
- NRSP Bahawalpur Region: Incredible Achievements
- Speech at UN General Assembly "Eradicating Poverty through Enterprise"
- RSPs at the United Nations
- Two Days with Mr. Rahul Gandhi, MP
- Internally Displaced Persons
- American Odyssey
- Invitation by Cherie Blair
- Rajiv Gandhi Mahila Vikas Pariyojana
