= International response to the 2005 Kashmir earthquake =

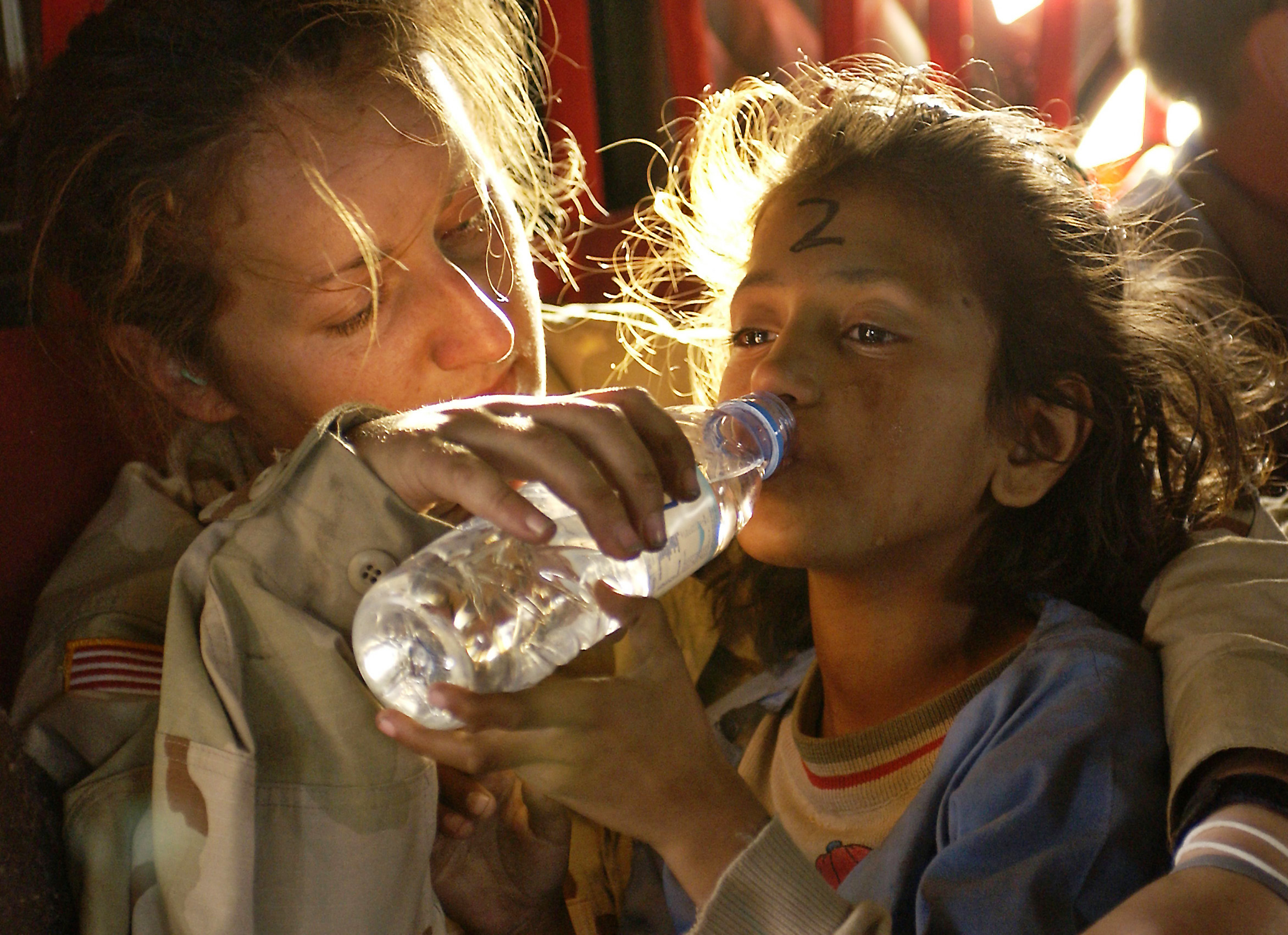
A U.S. Army soldier gives a young Pakistani Kashmiri girl a drink of water as they are airlifted from Muzaffarabad to Islamabad

The international response to the 2005 Kashmir earthquake was widespread and immediate, as many countries, international organizations and non-governmental organizations offered an abundance of relief aid to the affected regions − particularly Pakistan, which was hit the hardest due to the earthquake's epicentre being around Muzaffarabad, the capital city of Pakistani-administered Azad Jammu and Kashmir. The aid given was in the form of monetary donations and pledges, as well as relief supplies including food, various medical supplies, tents and blankets. Rescue and relief workers as well as peacekeeping troops were sent from different parts of the world to the region, bringing along rescue equipment, including helicopters and rescue dogs. The earthquake displaced some 3.3 million people, while killing around 80,000–100,000.

== Africa ==
- Tunisia - The Tunisian government sent a C-130 plane with 14 tons of relief supplies, including food, blankets and medical supplies to Pakistan.

== Asia ==
- Afghanistan - The Afghan government sent four rescue helicopters from its nascent air force, as well as a fixed-wing plane loaded with four tons of medicine and army medical personnel, to help with disaster relief in the hardest-hit areas of Kashmir. The country also pledged US$500,000 in aid. The Afghan Red Crescent Society also announced that it would donate 20 tons of dried food and send teams of medical personnel. The aid was given to the local authorities, with Pakistan getting most of it because the damages were greater on the Pakistani side of the border.
- Cambodia – The Prime Minister of Cambodia, Hun Sen, pledged US$60,000 in assistance.
- China - The government of the People's Republic of China offered emergency aid worth US$6.2 million to help earthquake victims in Pakistan. A 49-member international rescue team and the first batch of rescue materials were sent to Pakistan on October 9, 2005. US$1 million in cash was sent out on October 10, 2005. Rescue teams with sniffer dogs were deployed throughout the region to search for and rescue any survivors.
- Hong Kong - The government of Hong Kong approved a grant of HK$3.5 million from the Disaster Relief Fund to World Vision Hong Kong in order to undertake relief projects. Hong Kong procured and arranged to air-freight 20 tons of relief supply, including tents and blankets, to Pakistan.
- India - Prime Minister Manmohan Singh offered quake assistance to Pakistan. Indian and Pakistani High Commissioners were in touch regarding cooperation in relief work. India sent 25 tons of relief material to Pakistan including food, blankets and medicine. Indian MNCs companies such as Infosys have offered aid up to $226,000. On October 12, an Ilyushin-76 cargo plane ferried across seven truckloads (about 82 tons) of army medicines, 15,000 blankets and 50 tents and returned to New Delhi. A senior air force official also stated that they were asked by the Indian government to be ready to fly out another similar consignment. On October 14, India dispatched the second consignment to relief material to Pakistan, by train through the Wagah Border. The consignment included 5,000 blankets, 370 tents, 5 tons of plastic sheets and 12 tons of medicine. The third consignment was of medicine and relief material and was supposed to be sent, also by train. India also pledged $25 million as aid to Pakistan.

India opened the first of three points at Chakan Da Bagh, in Poonch, on the Line of Control (LoC) between India and Pakistan for the 2005 Kashmir earthquake relief work.

- Indonesia - Indonesia sent a C-130 Hercules aircraft with a medical team, medicine and various emergency materials to Pakistan. The Indonesian Red Cross (PMI) also prepared to send humanitarian relief and a special team.
- Iran - Iran dispatched different food items, blankets, tents and medicine through two aircraft.
- Israel - Israel offered aid to Pakistan and India immediately following the earthquake; Pakistan accepted the aid on the condition that the aid be channeled through a third-party organization such as the United Nations. The nature of the aid is unknown.
- Jordan – Prince Rashid bin Al Hassan, chief of the Jordanian Relief Agencies arrived in Pakistan on October 11, 2005, bringing with him a 50-bed mobile hospital to be deployed in Rawalakot.
- Japan - Japan provided experts and equipment for rescue operations. On October 11, 2005, Japan pledged a further US$20 million and stated that it was ready to dispatch dozens of troops and several transport helicopters to aid relief efforts. A statement by the Japanese Defense Ministry clarified on October 12, 2005, that they would be sending approximately 290 troops and three helicopters to help with the relief work in Pakistan.
- Kuwait - The Kuwaiti government announced US$100 million in aid to Pakistan. Half of the aid package was expected to be offered in the form of relief assistance, while the other half (approximately $51 million) would be used to repair damaged infrastructure.
- Malaysia - Malaysia dispatched a search-and-rescue team to quake-ravaged Pakistan and US$1 million (MYR 3.8 million) to its government. The Malaysian team comprised 50 men from various agencies and non-governmental organizations, including the National Security Division, Special Malaysia Disaster Assistance and Rescue Team (SMART), Kuala Lumpur Hospital, Malaysian Red Crescent Society and Mercy Malaysia.
- Nepal – Nepal offered US$50,000 in relief to Pakistan.
- Pakistan - In late 2006, a $20 billion development scheme was mooted by Pakistan for reconstruction and rehabilitation of the earthquake hit zones in Azad Kashmir. A land use plan for Muzaffarabad city had been prepared by Japan International Cooperation Agency.
- Qatar - A spokesman for the Qatari foreign ministry said that the country was also willing to give humanitarian assistance to Pakistan.
- Saudi Arabia - Saudi King Abdullah announced an emergency aid package worth 133 million dollars for Pakistan. Earlier, Saudi King Abdullah ordered the rapid establishment of an airlift of doctors, medicine, tents and emergency supplies to the affected region. The Saudi public also made a big contribution to helping victims of the earthquake, on the call of Saudi government. The Saudi government went one step further by institutionalizing this assistance in the form of Saudi Public Assistance for Pakistan Earthquake victims (SPAPEV).
- Singapore - Singaporean response to 2005 Kashmir earthquake: Prime Minister Lee Hsien Loong, on behalf of the people of Singapore, expressed his deepest condolences and sympathies to the families of the victims. The Singapore Civil Defence Force was preparing to dispatch a 44-member Disaster Assistance and Rescue Team to help Pakistan's relief and rescue operations. Another two medical relief teams were also sent.
- South Korea - The South Korean government sent US$500,000 along with blankets, relief food, and medical supplies to Pakistan as part of their initial response. A further $3 million in aid was announced by the Ministry of Foreign Affairs and Trade on October 10, 2005.
- Turkey - Turkey sent 30 aircraft carrying medical teams to Pakistan. Furthermore, on October 20, 2005, Turkey announced a relief package of US$150 million; financial assistance of $100 million and relief goods worth $50 million including 1 million blankets, 50,000 tonnes of flour and 25,000 tonnes of sugar. The Turkish Red Crescent sent 90 health personnel to Pakistan, built tent cities and hospitals. The Turkish Red Crescent also started building a new tent city that will provide shelter for 70,000 people.
- United Arab Emirates - The total monetary commitment, as of October 10, 2005, was US$100 million. United Arab Emirates President Khalifa bin Zayed Al Nahyan, ordered the immediate dispatch of humanitarian aid to the region and rescue teams. The Dubai police also left for Pakistan.

== Europe ==
- Norway - Norway provided some NOK 240 million ($38 million) in aid.
- Poland - Poland sent rescue dogs, medics and other disaster specialists
- Belgium - Belgian Federal Government allocated EUR 250,000 (PKR 18 million) and Flemish Government EUR 125,000 (PKR 9 million) for equipment and relief assistance in Pakistan and India. A 5 people strong rescue team was sent and 22 people of the special B-fast rescue team, departed for the region on October 11, 2005. The main purpose of the B-fast team was to set up a field hospital for performing basic operations.
- Czech Republic - The prime minister Jiří Paroubek announced on TV, that the Czech Republic would provide the victims with CZK 25 million (PKR 61 million).
- Denmark - The Danish Government initially granted DKK 10 million (PKR 97 million) in aid, but later offered two additional grants of DKK 20 million each, making the total aid DKK 50 million (PKR 485 million).
- Estonia - Estonia sent an 18-member medical disaster relief team to the northern Pakistan city Batagram. The team worked there for two weeks, during which they built up a hospital tent complex, which was the main facility in the city for medical assistance
- Finland - Ministry for Foreign Affairs of Finland allocated EUR 1 million to support the joint field hospital of Finnish and Norwegian Red Cross organizations. The hospital staff included 20 Finnish medical workers, who left for Pakistan on October 12, 2005, and October 13, 2005. Finland also donated 1.000 tents capable of housing 15.000 individuals.
- France - France continued its efforts to assist the earthquake victims in Pakistan. After sending many rescue teams with dogs and equipment for rescue operations, French aid to Pakistan was, in November 2005, reaching 10.5 million euros. In addition to this, once must have also considered France's contribution to EU programs and the generous contributions to various NGOs and private companies mobilized in France and in the stricken region since the first day of the quake. On the night of the earthquake, French authorities rushed 25 civil security personnel, 20 rescuers accompanied by dogs and specialized search and rescue material, 41 SAMU (France's emergency medical agency) personnel, and 18 military doctors along with relief materials.
- Germany - Germany sent a team of 16 THW experts with dogs and equipment for locating people in collapsed buildings. The German Red Cross stood by with tents, water-purification equipment and mobile hospitals, to support the work of its partner organizations in the region.
- Netherlands - The Dutch Department of International Co-operation promised EUR 1 million. A team of 66 rescue workers arrived and worked in Bagh. The government added EUR 10 million, on October 11, 2005.
- Russia - Russia sent two flights carrying rescue teams with dogs and equipment for rescue operations, and it also sent a field hospital.
- Sweden - Sweden gave 196 million kronor (24,2 million dollars approximately). Sweden prepared to assist a rescue effort led by the UN in Pakistan according to Swedish Minister for Foreign Affairs Laila Freivalds.
- Switzerland - Switzerland dispatched ten disaster relief experts to Islamabad and the Swiss government pledged CHF 1 million and non-governmental organizations pledged another CHF 750,000.
- United Kingdom - Foreign Secretary Jack Straw said that Britain was sending out 60 disaster response workers including 50 medical staff. International Development Secretary Hilary Benn announced an initial allocation of PKR 10 million, or about GBP 95,000. As of mid-November 2005, Britain has pledged over GBP 100 million. On October 31, 2005 Virgin Atlantic operated a humanitarian aid charter flight to the capital of Pakistan, Islamabad with 55 tonnes of aid for the affected by the earthquake in Pakistan.

== Americas ==
- Canada - Canada offered CAD 100,000 (PKR 5 million) to the International Red Cross and Red Crescent Movement for early needs assessment. An additional CAD 200,000 (PKR 10 million) was provided to the Canadian High Commission in Pakistan to respond to urgent requirements, i.e. housing, water, food and clothing. The Minister for International Cooperation, Aileen Carroll, also announced a pledge of CAD 20 million (PKR 1 billion), including 21 tonnes of blankets, dispatched by Canadian Forces aircraft, some of which are being routed to Pakistan from current operations in Afghanistan. The Canadian government also pledged to match all public funds as well as lease two helicopters from the United Nations. A joint team of government officials also was sent to evaluate further assistance, including the possibility of sending the Disaster Assistance Response Team (DART). Also, due to the fact that many Canadians criticized their government of reacting slowly 10 months ago when the Asian tsunami hit, Canadian Prime Minister Paul Martin challenged Canada by saying that his government will match whatever donations Canadians make over the next two weeks to NGOs operating in the region. On October 26, 2005, CIDA increased its funding to $57 million, including $10 million donated to the South Asia Earthquake Matching Fund and the other half to the UN and the Red Cross movement.
- Cuba – President Fidel Castro offered, in a letter addressed to the President of Pakistan and made public by officials in Havana, to send 200 doctors to Pakistan in order to help treat the victims of the earthquake. Some 2,260 Cuban health brigadistas, more than 1,400 of them doctors, were in the area of Kashmir. The fully equipped Cuban Field Hospitals was handed over to the Pakistani government. The Cuban Government provided 234.5 tons of medicines and disposable materials, and 275.7 tons of most leading-edge equipment. More than 300 students of medicine took courses in the Cuban Field Hospitals. The Cuban Government decided to offer a wide and free medicine scholarships program for 1,000 young Pakistanis from rural communities.
  The first Cuban medical team was in Pakistan on October 14, six days after the earthquake, the fast acceptance of the aid was a surprise due to the close relation of Pakistan and the US; the two countries have not even exchanged Ambassadors at that time. The leading Pakistani newspaper Dawn quoted President Musharraf as saying that "one of the most heart-warming letters of support" following the earthquake was from Fidel Castro. In his letter, Castro said that it was difficult for him to rest when thousands of Pakistanis were spending their days in pain, awaiting surgery.
- United States - The United States announced that it would provide an initial contribution of US$156 million (PKR 3 billion) for emergency relief in Pakistan, and teams from the United States were the first on the scene to deliver assistance. The U.S. military also provided supplies and assistance. As of November 3, 2005, the U.S. Department of Defense (DOD) had 933 personnel providing relief and reconstruction assistance in support of the Pakistan earthquake relief effort. Five CH-47 Chinook and three UH-60 Black Hawk helicopters were moved into Pakistan immediately, and a C-17 Globemaster III military aircraft was assigned to bring blankets, tents and other relief supplies to the victims. The 212th Mobile Army Surgical Hospital (MASH), established October 25 in Muzaffarabad, had 36 Intensive Care Unit beds, 60 intermediate minimal care beds, and two operating rooms. To date the MASH has performed 46 surgeries, and treated 548 non-surgical patients. Furthermore, a 23-member logistical support group was also being dispatched from McGuire Air Force Base in New Jersey. The United States Agency for International Development provided more than US$41.8 million for relief work in Pakistan, including nine completed airlifts of relief supplies. The airlifts delivered a total of 45,000 blankets, 1,570 winterized tents, 6,150 rolls of plastic sheeting for approximately 30,750 families, 15,000 water containers, 17 water bladders, 2 water purification units, 10 WHO emergency health kits, and 20 concrete cutting saws. USAID has also committed funds to the UN, other international organizations and NGOs. On Wednesday, November 9, 2005, business leaders from GE, UPS, Pfizer, Xerox, and Citigroup met with President Bush at the White House to announce the launch of the South Asia Earthquake Relief Fund and website.

== Oceania ==
- Australia - Parliamentary Secretary for Foreign Affairs Bruce Billson offered condolences and said that Australia was donating A$500,000 (PKR23 million) for medical and relief assistance to help provide medical help and shelter to affected communities. Later, Foreign Minister Alexander Downer said the Government has increased its total aid pledge to A$5.5 million (PKR250 million). On 11 October 2005, this was extended by A$4.5 million (PKR 204 million), bringing its total contribution to A$10 million (PKR 453 million) In a Ministerial Press Release Defence on November 9, 2005, Defence Minister Robert Hill announced an ADF deployment of about 140 personnel; comprising a command element, an aviation detachment of four Blackhawk helicopters, and logistics and communication personnel. They were to be based in Islamabad and establish a central medical facility located in Dhanni a region 20 km north-east of Muzaffarabad to support efforts. The deployment lasted six months with an estimated cost of A$20 million.
- New Zealand - Caretaker Associate Minister of Foreign Affairs and Trade Marian Hobbs said the government aid agency NZAID would make an initial contribution of NZD 750,000 (PKR 31 million) to the international relief effort. On 14 October 2005, this was extended by NZD 750,000 (PKR 31 million), bringing its total contribution to NZD 1.5 million (PKR 62 million)

== Multinational organizations ==
- United Nations — An eight-member U.N. relief team arrived in Pakistan to aid in search-and-rescue operations, coordinate relief efforts and assess the impact of the quake. Agencies involved included the: United Nations Children's Fund, United Nations World Food Programme, United Nations Population Fund and the International Nongovernmental Organizations Forum. Supplies such as blankets, clothes, tents, food for infants and medicine were sent to the disaster regions. The Office for the Coordination of Humanitarian Affairs released US$100,000 (PKR 5 million) of emergency fund for immediate relief aid.
- World Health Organization - WHO rushed 100,000 doses of anti-tetanus globulin to Pakistan as part of their relief effort. WHO had an extensive deployment in Pakistan's affected area.
- European Union — The European Commission released EUR 3.6 million (PKR 260 million) on 9 October 2005. Funds were made available to partner humanitarian organisations through ECHO, the humanitarian aid department of the European Commission.
- Organisation of the Islamic Conference (OIC) — Secretary general Ekmeleddin Ihsanoglu expressed immense shock and sadness at the tragedy and conveyed his "profound and sincere condolences to the government and the brotherly people of the Islamic Republic of Pakistan". He strongly appealed to all OIC member states and the international community, to expeditiously extend all possible humanitarian assistance and support to the Government and people of Pakistan, to overcome the impact of this tragedy.
- World Bank Group - On October 9, 2005, the World Bank committed US$20 million for recovery in Pakistan. This amount was raised to $40 million on October 11, 2005. A further $100 million was offered to build "designed houses" in Northern Pakistan and Kashmir area.

== Non-governmental organizations ==
- Human Aid Focus- was the first NGO to start work in Bagh, Azad Kashmir and won numerous awards for their emergency response. After the 2005 earthquake, they continued working in the area building shelters, school and on women empowerment projects.
- Humanity First- The first to reach the earthquake zone. Doctors, paramedics and volunteers from the UK, Canada, USA and Pakistan opened medical and tent camps which continued to provide longterm health care and shelter to the victims of the earthquake.
- Direct Relief - Through October 31, 2006, Direct Relief provided 1.5 million courses of treatment of specifically requested medicines, supplies, and equipment, along with $1.1 million in cash grants to 12 clinics, hospitals, and organizations, to the relief effort, and continues to provide ongoing programmatic support to its partners.
- Oxfam - An emergency assessment and response team was dispatched to the region. A coordinator said that the "initial needs appear to be tents, blankets, medical kits, food aid, water and trauma counseling for those affected."
- The Sarhad Rural Support Programme provided immediate relief efforts at a large scale following which it was involved in making damage assessments and paying compensation and monitoring the rebuilding of over 62,000 houses under the project named Earthquake Relief and Rehabilitation Project.
- The International Rescue Corps deployed a specialist Urban Search and Rescue team of 14 volunteers to Pakistan as part of the wider UK response.
- Red Crescent - Emergency assessment and response teams were deployed in all parts of the affected region. A team of the International Committee of the Red Cross (ICRC) reached Muzaffarabad on October 10, 2005. Further teams deployed in Uri and Jammu with the Indian Red Cross Society. The ICRC set up a website to facilitate the contact between relatives and friends unable to get in touch with each other.
- The Salvation Army - Mobilized some truckloads of relief supplies.
- SOS Children's Villages announced an emergency relief program in Jammu and Kashmir.
- Subh-e-Nau: An Environment and Public Health Concern was the first to initiate an aid and volunteer coordination mechanism. It later studied and put together the SN Disability Reduction and Rehabilitation Strategy that was presented to the international relief community. The SN Disability Program then focused on rehabilitation of persons with spinal cord injury, with the help of national and international volunteers, mainly from Canada.
- The Minhaj Welfare Foundation has been active in Pakistan over a decade. At the time of the earthquake they established tent villages with supplies and full medical facilities.
- The Edhi Foundation has been active in Pakistan for two decades. They provided food, clothes, blankets and medicine to those affected by the disaster.
- The World Islamic Mission Welfare Trust - sent out phases of doctors to the area, including both General Physicians and Surgeons with tens of thousands of pounds worth of medicine. They also set up various dispensaries within affected areas, as well as collaborated with hospitals within the area to take airlifted injured survivors. Rehabilitation was the main focus after the immediate phase has passed.
- SPO - Provided relief aid and medical goods at the Lady Reading and Khyber Hospitals, in Peshawar. Till date, goods worth 850 000 Rs. were sent.
- DEMIRA Deutsche Minenraeumer e.V. deployed an emergency team to Balakot district only hours after the earthquake. In cooperation with the Pakistan army DEMIRA set up a medical facility in the valley of Ghanool providing the hard-hit mountain communities with lifesaving triage and air ambulance.
- JEN Japan Emergency NGOs worked for the relief operation on 9 October 2005. Expert came from Japan to provide Non Food Items (NFIs) to the affected people in District Bagh. JEN worked in District Bagh until December 2008. JEN constructed 3 permanent structure (earthquake proof)Schools and 3 Shelter schools, each school contains 2 shelters.

== Estimate of financial aid ==
On November 19, 2005, it was estimated that the international community as a whole pledged about US$5.8 billion.

== Effects ==
A 2016 study showed that the Pakistanis affected by the international relief effort showed markedly higher trust in Europeans, Americans and Cubans.
