= NRSP =

NRSP may refer to:

- National Revolutionary Socialist Party
- NRSP Micro Finance Bank Limited
- NRSP Micro Finance Bank Limited
- New Riders of the Purple Sage
