= National Rural Support Programme =

Rural development programme in Pakistan

National Rural Support Programme (NRSP) is a poverty alleviation programme established by the Government of Pakistan in 1991. In 1995, NRSP established Ghazi Barotha Taraqiati Idara with funding from the World Bank.

== NRSP Microfinance Bank ==
The NRSP Microfinance Bank commenced its operations in March 2011. It is the subsidiary of National Rural Support Programme which is an integrated rural development organization registered under company's ordinance 1984 with corporate law authority Islamabad. The NRSP Microfinance Bank headquarters is in Bahawalpur.

=== Shareholding pattern ===
- National Rural Support Programme 57%
- International Finance Corporation 16%
- Acumen 11%
- PROPACRO 16%

== See also ==
- Balochistan Rural Support Programme
- Sarhad Rural Support Programme
- Aga Khan Rural Support Programme
- Rural Support Programmes Network
