= List of microfinance banks =

This is a list of microfinance banks

== A ==
1. Advans

== B ==
1. Bandhan Bank
2. BRAC

== E ==
1. ESAF Small Finance Bank

== F ==
1. FINCA
2. First MicroFinance Bank-Afghanistan
3. First MicroFinance Bank-Pakistan
4. First MicroFinance Bank-Tajikistan

== G ==
1. Grameen Bank

== K ==
1. Khushhali Bank

== N ==
1. NRSP Microfinance Bank
2. National Bank for Agriculture and Rural Development

== T ==
1. Telenor Bank
