= National Revolutionary Party =

National Revolutionary Party may refer to:

- National Revolutionary Party of Afghanistan
- Guatemalan National Revolutionary Unity
- National Revolutionary Socialist Party of Kerala, India
- Korean National Revolutionary Party, nationalist party formed in 1935 and dissolved in 1947
- National Revolutionary Party (Mexico)
- National Revolutionary Dividends Party or National Revolutionary Party of South Korea
- National Revolutionary Party (South Korea, 2021), far-right, Christian party led by pastor Jeon Kwang-hoon
