= Habib Bank Limited =

Pakistani commercial banking based in Karachi

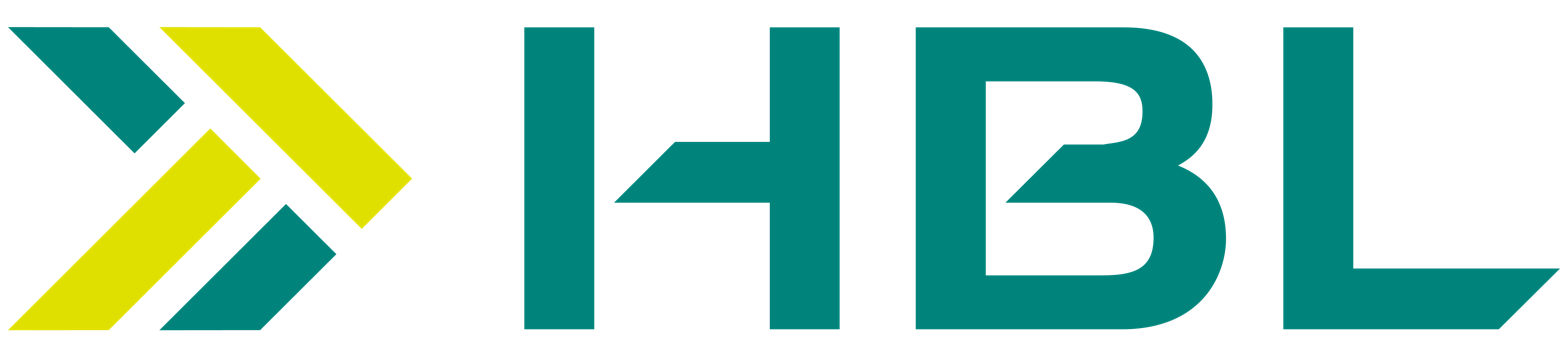

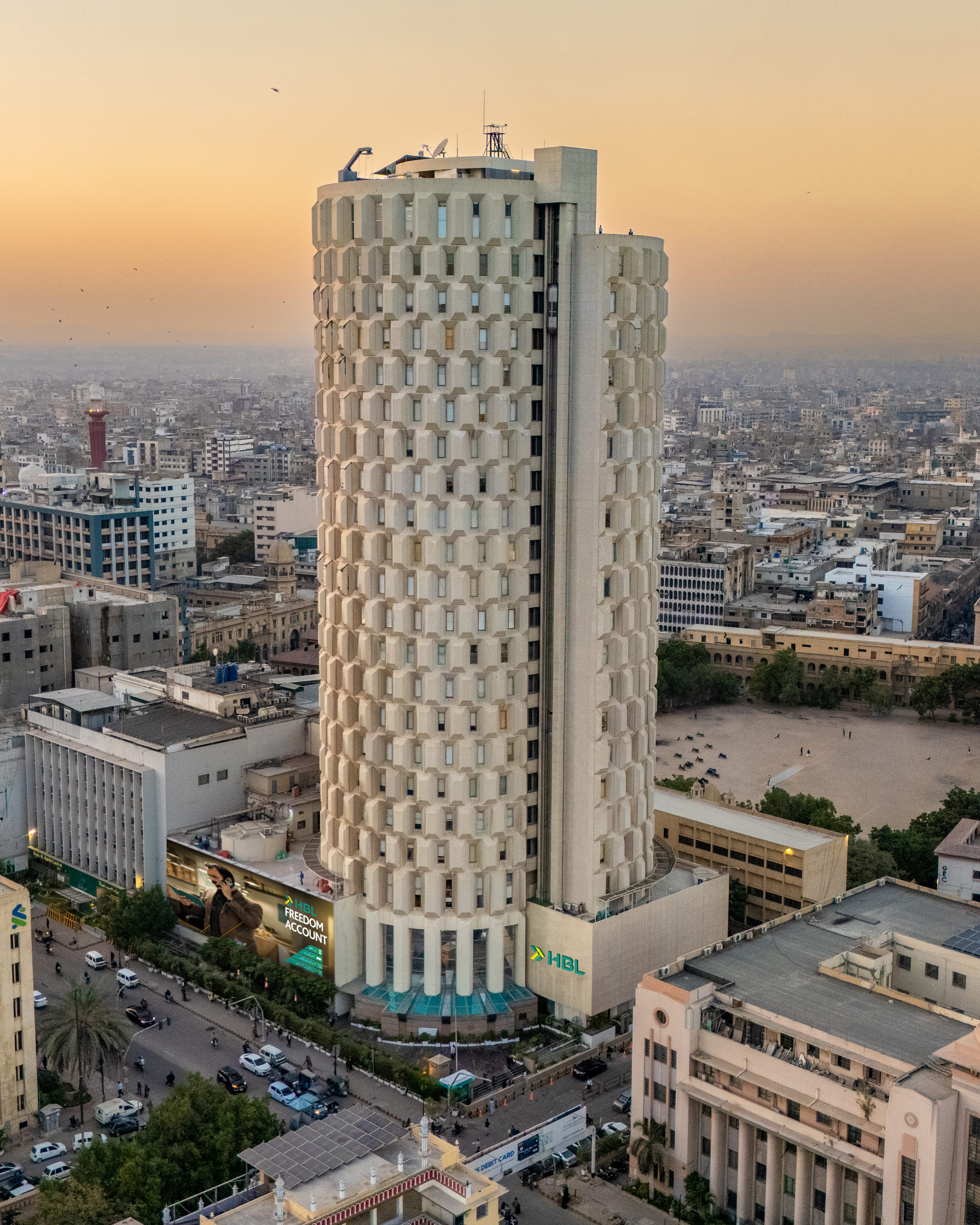
- Habib Bank Plaza, I.I. Chundrigar Road, Karachi
- Native name: حبیب بینک محدود
- Type: Public
- Traded as: PSX: HBL; KSE 100 component KSE 30 component
- Industry: Banking
- Founded: 25 August 1941; 85 years ago
- Founders: Mohammed Ali Habib; Dawood Habib
- Headquarters: Principal office, HBL Tower, Karachi, Pakistan
- Number of locations: 1,740 (2025)
- Key people: Sultan Ali Allana (Chairman); Muhammad Nassir Salim (CEO)
- Products: Loans, credit cards, debit cards, savings, consumer banking, business banking, Islamic banking, prestige banking, etc.
- Revenue: ▲ Rs. 361.10 billion (US$1.3 billion) (2025)
- Operating income: ▲ Rs. 157.21 billion (US$560 million) (2025)
- Net income: ▲ Rs. 66.76 billion (US$240 million) (2025)
- Total assets: ▲ Rs. 7.70 trillion (US$28 billion) (2025)
- Total equity: ▲ Rs. 488.6 billion (US$1.7 billion) (2025)
- Number of employees: 20,756 (2025)
- Parent: Aga Khan Fund for Economic Development
- Subsidiaries: Habib Allied Holding Limited; HBL Bank UK Limited; HBL Currency Exchange Limited; HBL Asset Management Limited; HBL Zarai Services Limited; Habib Bank Financial Services Limited; HBL Microfinance Bank (79.92%)
- Website: hbl.com
- Footnotes; Financials as of 31 December 2025

Habib Bank Limited (HBL) is a Pakistani bank headquartered at Habib Bank Plaza, Karachi with regional offices in Lahore and Islamabad. It is a subsidiary of Swiss-based organisation Aga Khan Fund for Economic Development (AKFED).

Established in 1941 by the Habib family, it is the oldest bank in Pakistan post-independence. In 1972, the bank moved its headquarters to the Habib Bank Plaza which was the tallest building in South Asia at the time. It was nationalised in 1974 by the Government of Pakistan and privatised it in 2004; at that time, the Aga Khan Fund for Economic Development acquired a controlling share and management control.

HBL is one of the largest domestic bank in Pakistan in terms of assets, and has been included in the Forbes Global 2000. As of 2025, HBL is the fourth largest bank in Pakistan by market capitalization and serves about 15% of all Pakistani bank deposits. It is Pakistan's largest bank by tier 1 capital.

== History ==
Habib Bank Limited was established in Bombay in 1941 as a public limited company by the Habib family, which had prior experience in internal trade and private banking. Its founding coincided with the revitalization of Muslim politics under Muhammad Ali Jinnah from 1936 and reflected an effort to counter Hindu-British dominance. With Jinnah's support and that of the All-India Muslim League, Habib Bank provided financial services to the Muslim League and was appointed banker to the Muslim League Fund, the Pakistan Fund, and the Quaid-e-Azam Bihar Relief Fund. Muhammad Ali Jinnah maintained a close relationship with Mahomedali Habib, the founder of the bank. In 1937, the Habib family converted from Ismailism to Ithna'ashari (Twelver) Shi'ism, to align religiously with Jinnah.

In early 1947, at Jinnah's request, Habib Bank relocated its headquarters to Karachi on 7 August 1947, shortly before the Partition of India. The move facilitated the transfer of Muslim financial assets to Pakistan, supporting both individual depositors and institutional accounts. The bank subsequently became an important component in the economic framework of newly independent Pakistan.

Habib Bank began expanding internationally in 1951, opening three branches in Sri Lanka, and in 1952 it established Habib Bank (Overseas) Limited to support its international business. HBL continued to expand along key trade routes, opening the first of five branches in Kenya in 1956 and a branch in Aden in 1957.

During the 1960s, HBL expanded into major financial and commercial centers. It opened the first of six branches in the United Kingdom in 1961. In 1964, it opened the first of four branches in Mauritius and a branch in Beirut. In 1966, it entered the Gulf by opening the first of eight branches in the United Arab Emirates.

HBL expanded further in 1969, opening the first of three branches in Bahrain and established an Offshore Banking Unit (OBU) there. In the same period, the Aden branch was nationalised by the South Yemeni government. In the early 1970s, HBL opened an OBU in Singapore and a branch in New York City in 1971. In 1972, it entered Oman with the first of eleven branches and constructed Habib Bank Plaza in Karachi.

The Habib family owned and managed the bank until the Pakistan government nationalised it on 1 January 1974. and merged Habib Bank (Overseas) Limited and Standard Bank into it. The Habib family received compensation of PKR 36.31 per share from the Government of Pakistan and subsequently the bank was delisted from the Karachi Stock Exchange.

In 1975, HBL opened a branch in Belgium and in the same year its Beirut branch building was destroyed in the communal riots. In 1976, it opened a branch in the Seychelles, Bangladesh, and the Maldives. It was followed with a branch in the Netherlands in 1979, branches in Paris and Hong Kong in 1980, and in 1981 the establishment of Nigeria Habib Bank with 40% ownership, along with a representative office in Tehran.

HBL opened a branch in Khartoum in 1982, branches in the Karachi Export Processing Zone and Istanbul in 1983, and a branch in Australia in 1987. In 1991, HBL opened a branch in Fiji and assumed control of the Pakistan branches of the failed BCCI. In 1992, HBL acquired a 20% stake in Himalayan Bank in Nepal, and in 1995 it established a representative office in Cairo. During this period, it also developed additional financial services platforms, including Habib Finance (Australia) and Habib Finance International Limited in Hong Kong.

On 13 June 2002, Pakistan's Privatisation Commission announced that the Government of Pakistan would grant the Aga Khan Fund for Economic Development, a subsidiary of the Aga Khan Development Network, majority ownership of HBL against AKFED's investment in the bank.

In 2002, Habib Bank's operations in the United Kingdom faced potential closure due to regulatory issues with the Financial Services Authority. The issue was resolved by converting the operations into a subsidiary. Subsequently, Habib Bank and Allied Bank merged their UK operations, with Habib Bank contributing six branches and Allied Bank contributing four branches. This merger resulted in the formation of Habib-Allied International Bank, in which Habib Bank held a 90.5% share, while Allied Bank held 9.5%.

In December 2003, the Government of Pakistan granted AKFED rights to 51% of the shareholding in the bank against an investment of PKR 22.409 billion (US$389 million). In February 2004, Government of Pakistan handed over management control of Habib Bank to AKFED. The Board of Directors was reconstituted to have four AKFED nominees, including the Chairman and the President/CEO, and three Government of Pakistan nominees.

In 2013, the bank acquired Citibank Pakistan consumer business for Rs. 2 billion. In April 2015, the Government of Pakistan sold its 41.5% stake or 609 million shares in the bank for US$1.02 billion. According to the finance ministry, the strike price of PKR 168 per share (compared to the floor price of PKR 166 per share) was recommended by the Privatisation Commission Board. The bank's owners now comprise the Aga Khan Fund for Economic Development (51%), and the remaining 49% of shares are in free float. CDC Group holds 4.99%, and the International Finance Corporation holds 0.87%, while individuals, institutions, and funds hold the rest of the shares. In June 2015, the bank acquired Barclays' Pakistan operations and absorbed the staff. On 18 April 2016, HBL received a licence to operate a subsidiary in Ürümqi, Xinjiang, becoming the first Pakistani bank to operate in China. In 2017, HBL opened a branch in China at Ürümqi High-tech Industrial Development Zone. In February 2018, HBL appointed Muhammad Aurangzeb as its president and CEO following the early retirement of Nauman K. Dar on 31 December 2017, after the bank was marred by a penalty of $225 Million (USD) for its non-compliance with risk management and anti-money laundering rules.

In 2020, HBL was designated as a domestic systemically important bank (D-SIB) of the by the State Bank of Pakistan. In 2021, HBL opened a branch in Beijing, China.

== Corporate governance ==
Board of Directors
| Name | Position |
|---|---|
| Sultan Ali Allana | Chairman of the board |
| Moez Ahamed Jamal | Director |
| Shafiq Dharamshi | Director |
| Salim Raza | Director |
| Najeeb Samie | Director |
| Saba Kamal | Director |
| Khaleel Ahmed | Director |

=== List of CEOs ===
1. R. Zakir Mahmood (2000 – 28 September 2012)
2. Nauman K. Dar (28 September 2012 – 31 December 2017)
3. Rayomond Kotwal - Interim CEO (31 December 2017 – 30 April 2018)
4. Muhammad Aurangzeb (30 April 2018 – 11 March 2024)
5. Muhammad Nassir Salim (11 March 2024 – )

== Subsidiaries ==
=== HBL Asset Management ===
HBL Asset Management Limited (HBL AMC) was incorporated in 2006 and launched its first fund in 2007. In 2016, HBL AMC acquired PICIC Asset Management for PKR 4.1 billion. In 2020, HBL received approval from the State Bank of Pakistan to inject PKR 500 million in HBL AMC. As of December 2024, HBL AMC had PKR 320 billion (US$1.3 billion) in assets under management, making it the fourth largest AMC in Pakistan.

=== HBL Microfinance Bank ===
HBL Microfinance Bank (HBL MfB) was established in 2002 through a structured transformation of the credit and savings section of the Aga Khan Rural Support Programme (AKRSP), an integrated development programme to pioneer the microfinance sector in the country since 1982 in Gilgit-Baltistan and Chitral. HBL holds a majority share-holding of 89.38% in HBL MfB. In 2024, HBL announced an equity investment of PKR 6 billion in HBL MfB.

== Lawsuits and controversies ==
=== DFS Investigation ===
In September 2017, HBL agreed to pay a fine of US$225 million in an out-of-court settlement with the New York State Department of Financial Services (DFS) against 53 separate violations allegedly committed between 2007 and 2017.

Following this, HBL shares surged 5 percent, to PKR 160.58 per share, amid investor relief that the fine was not larger than US$225 million. The penalty, however, is the largest ever imposed upon a Pakistani financial institution. HBL had already agreed to surrender its licence to operate a branch in New York that had been operational since 1978.

The DFS had earlier sought up to US$630 million in penalties from HBL for failing to comply with state and federal laws at its only U.S. branch. According to The Nation, compliance issues dated back to 2015 when the DFS told HBL to institute a series of reforms about the bank's policies for preventing illicit money transfers. In a December 2015 statement, the DFS identified issues in the bank's anti-money laundering compliance.

Habib also allegedly cleared transactions to a cybercriminal wanted by the US Federal Bureau of Investigation and a Chinese weapons manufacturer that was subject to US sanctions. Since Habib's New York operations were used to clear dollar-denominated transactions, the bank is required to follow US "know your customer" rules and sanctions law.

=== Allegations of Terror Financing ===
On 28 September 2022, a New York district court passed an order under the Justice Against Sponsors of Terrorism Act placing secondary liability on Habib Bank Limited as a party that "aids and abets, by knowingly providing substantial assistance, or who conspires with the person who committed such an act of international terrorism". The plaintiff claimed that between 2010 and 2019, the bank had aided and abetted Al-Qaeda terrorism and had participated in a conspiracy to launch attacks in Afghanistan that killed or injured 370 people. In response, HBL released a statement claiming the accusations were "meritless" and that the bank was fiercely and thoroughly contesting them.

=== FinCEN ===
In 2020, HBL was named in FinCEN leak published by Buzzfeed News and the International Consortium of Investigative Journalists (ICIJ) regarding the role global banks play in money laundering. It had one suspicious transaction flagged.

=== Federal Reserve Board ===
In September 2020, the Federal Reserve Board terminated enforcement actions against Habib Bank Limited and its New York branch that had been in effect since a 2015 cease-and-desist order. The action followed the bank's efforts to strengthen compliance controls and its voluntary closure of the New York branch in 2020 to meet regulatory requirements.

== See also ==
- List of largest companies in Pakistan
- Economy of Pakistan
- Habib Bank Plaza
- List of Banks in Pakistan
