= PPHI =

PPHI may refer to:

- Post-Polio Health International, US-based polio survivors' support organisation
- People’s Primary Healthcare Initiative KP, Health initiative in Pakistan
- Peninsula Postgraduate Health Institute, provider of medical education in Devon and Cornwall, England
