= Aga Khan Foundation =

Private international development agency

- Formation: 1967
- Founder: Aga Khan IV
- Type: Non-governmental organization
- Purpose: International Development
- Headquarters: Geneva, Switzerland
- Affiliations: Aga Khan Development Network
- Website: AKF

The Aga Khan Foundation (AKF) is a private, not-for-profit international development agency, which was founded in 1967 by Shah Karim Al Hussaini, Aga Khan IV, the 49th Hereditary Imam of the Shia Ismaili Muslims. AKF seeks to provide long-term solutions to problems of poverty, hunger, illiteracy and ill health in the poorest parts of South and Central Asia, Eastern and Western Africa, and the Middle East. In these regions, the needs of rural communities in mountainous, coastal and resource poor areas are given particular attention. The Foundation's activities often reinforce the work of other sister agencies within the Aga Khan Development Network (AKDN). While these agencies are guided by different mandates pertaining to their respective fields of expertise (the environment, culture, microfinance, health, education, architecture, rural development), their activities are often coordinated with one another in order to "multiply" the overall effect that the Network has in any given place or community. AKF also collaborates with local, national and international partners in order to bring about sustainable improvements of life in the 14 countries in which it implements programmes. The Foundation's head office is located in Geneva, Switzerland.

== Areas of focus ==
The Foundation has seven areas of focus that include: early childhood development, education, health and nutrition, agriculture and food security, civil society, work and enterprise, and climate resilience. Seeking innovative approaches to complex problems, it tries to identify solutions that can be adapted to conditions in many different regions and replicated.

Cross-cutting issues that are also addressed by the Foundation include human resource development, community participation, and gender and development.

== Funding ==
The Aga Khan provides the Foundation with regular funding for administration as well as making contributions to its endowment. Grants from government, institutional and private sector partners including from the United Nations, Global Affairs Canada, USAID, the UK's FCDO, the German Federal Foreign Office, Agence Française de Développement and others represent substantial sources of funding. The Ismaili community also contributes financial resources as well as volunteers, time, and professional services.

== Awards and recognition ==
Among other recognition for its work, the Foundation received the 2005 Award for Most Innovative Development Project from the Global Development Network for the Aga Khan Rural Support Programme (AKRSP). The AKRSP has successfully been replicated to form the Rural Support Programmes Network in Pakistan.

== Geographic focus ==
The Aga Khan Foundation has a presence in 17 countries globally, implementing programmes in 14 of those including in: Eastern Africa (Kenya, Madagascar, Mozambique, Tanzania and Uganda); Central & South Asia (Afghanistan, India, Kyrgyz Republic, Pakistan and Tajikistan); the Middle East (Egypt and Syria); and Europe (Portugal). The Foundation has fundraising and technical support offices in Canada, Switzerland, the United Kingdom and the United States.

=== Canada ===
The Aga Khan Foundation Canada was established in 1980 and has developed partnerships with Canadian institutions to support the global work of the Aga Khan Foundation. In 2026, the Foundation acquired land in Laval, Quebec, for the construction of the Laval Jamatkhana, an Ismaili Muslim community centre scheduled to open in 2028. The approximately 42,000-square-foot facility, valued at $21.5 million and funded through philanthropic donations, is set to include prayer, cultural and community spaces. The project received the support of the Mayor of Laval and Canada’s Minister of National Revenue.

== Sources ==
- AKF and AKDN: A Continuum of Development
