= Munawar Humayun Khan =

Munawar Humayun Khan was a Pakistani social worker. She was a Chairperson of SRSP and the wife of a Pakistani diplomat, Humayun Khan.

Khan chaired the board of directors of Sarhad Rural Support Programme (SRSP) and also served on the Board of many other not-for-profit organizations including: Pakistan Center for Philanthropy (PCP), Dost - Drug Rehabilitation Center, Ghazi Barotha Taraqiati Idara and the Rural Support Programmes Network (RSPN). She also Chairs the Board of Directors of Agribusiness Support Fund (ASF).
