= Programme for Economic Advancement and Community Empowerment =

EU funded community development programme in Pakistan

Programme for Economic Advancement and Community Empowerment (PEACE) is a four-year project funded by the European Union. and implemented by the Sarhad Rural Support Programme (SRSP). It was launched in 2013 in all districts of Malakand Division, Khyber Pakhtunkhwa, Pakistan, namely, Swat, Shangla, Buner, Lower Dir, Upper Dir, Chitral and Malakand Agency.

== Project details ==
The Programme for Economic Advancement and Community Empowerment (PEACE) commenced after an agreement worth € 40 million was signed between the Sarhad Rural Support Programme (SRSP) and the European Union (EU). The project runs under the principles of financial sustainability and equitable sharing of benefits with the community for social development purposes.

=== Hydro electricity ===
Under the PEACE project 62% of the funding is utilised for generation of community run micro-hydro power units in the project areas. Hydro power stations under the project are primarily built in areas where there is no active national grid or where such grid stands disrupted. Communities contribute time and labour, known as "sweat equity", which creates a sense of ownership and helps sustain the projects. The MHPs are run as a social enterprise and its earnings are spent on the welfare of local communities, particularly women. Electricity is generated harnessing the small glacier-meltwater rivers that drop steeply off soaring mountains.

The European Union under the PEACE project has funded the Sarhad Rural Support Programme (SRSP) to set up 240 micro hydropower plants, in the Malakand Division. In general, PKR 4/unit is charged for domestic and PKR 7-10/unit is charged for commercial use.

=== Community infrastructure ===
A significant portion of the funds are allocated to the building or restoration of basic infrastructure such as road, bridges, water channels etc.

== Environmental aspect ==
Electricity from hydro schemes cuts down the use of wood for cooking, heating and lighting, consequently reducing deforestation which is a huge problem in the region. The hydro schemes also cut greenhouse gas emissions, by virtually eliminating the use of kerosene lighting, cutting the use of diesel generators, and also reducing the use of unsustainable wood. A detailed breakdown has not been made of fuels replaced, but an indication of the significance can be made by assuming that the estimated 110,000 MWh of electricity generated each year replaces diesel generation producing around 0.8 tonnes of carbon dioxide per MWh. This suggests a substantial greenhouse gas saving of around 88,000 tonnes of carbon dioxide per year.

Pakistan is only producing 128 out of a potential of 3,100 MW of electricity from small hydropower projects.

== Recognition ==
In 2015 the Programme for Economic Advancement and Community Empowerment (PEACE) project earned the Sarhad Rural Support Programme (SRSP) an Ashden Award for Increasing Energy Access. In 2017 the project attracted the National Award given out by the Energy Globe Award in Pakistan for supplying electricity to off-grid areas.

== See also ==
- European Union
- Hydro power
- Pico hydro
- Small hydro
- Renewable energy
- Sustainable energy
