= Bacha Khan Poverty Alleviation Programme =

Pakistani organisation

Bacha Khan Poverty Alleviation Programme (BKPAP), named after Khudai-e-Khidmatgar movement leader, Bacha Khan, was a public-private venture sponsored by the Khyber Pakhtunkhwa Government, and executed by the Sarhad Rural Support Programme (SRSP), in the selected districts of Khyber Pakhtunkhwa, Pakistan.

Major components of the poverty alleviation programme included executing community-based uplift projects, social mobilisation, skill development and cash grants to a selected segment of the target areas. Implementation of a health insurance scheme in the target districts was also part of the programme.

== See also ==
- Poverty in Pakistan
- Poverty threshold
- List of countries by percentage of population living in poverty
