= Sultan Ali Allana =

Sultan Ali Alana - Pakistani banker (born 1959)

- سلطان علی الانا
- Allana in 2020
- Born: 1959 (age 66–67); Karachi, Pakistan
- Education: St. Patrick's High School, Karachi, D. J. Sindh Government Science College, McGill University, University of Wisconsin (MS)
- Occupations: Banker, Philanthropist, Business Leader
- Organization: Habib Bank Limited
- Board member of: Habib Bank Limited, Aga Khan Fund for Economic Development
- Awards: Sitara-e-Imtiaz, Hilal-i-Imtiaz & Nishan-e-Khidmat

Sultan Ali Allana (Urdu: سلطان علی الانا) is a Pakistani banker and philanthropist. He is the chairman of Habib Bank Limited and a director of the Aga Khan Fund for Economic Development.

Sultan Ali Allana is the youngest son of Akbar Ali Allana and Malek Sultan Bandeali, daughter of Gulam Hyder Bandeali Kassam.

== Early life and education ==
Sultan Ali Allana was born in Karachi into a Sindhi family in 1959. He attended St. Patrick's High School, and DJ Science College before moving to Canada where he obtained an undergraduate degree in Mechanical Engineering. Subsequently, he attained a postgraduate diploma in Management from McGill University. He then attended the University of Wisconsin, USA, where he obtained an MS in Management Technology.

== Career ==
Sultan Ali Allana’s career began at Citibank in 1985 as a Relationship Manager Executive Trainee. He rose through the ranks to later become the Head of the Local Corporate Group.

Later, he ventured into entrepreneurship, co-founding Global Securities. The company launched a joint venture with Union Bank of Switzerland, which operated in Hong Kong. He was involved in drafting the Microfinance Institutions Ordinance of 2001 and he established the First Micro-Finance Bank Limited with the sponsorship of Aga Khan Fund for Economic Development (AKFED), where he served as a chairman.

=== Chairman HBL ===
In 2004, he was appointed as the Chairman of Habib Bank Limited after the institution's privatization.

== Awards ==
- Sitara-e-Imtiaz – 2005
- Hilal-e-Imtiaz – 2023
- Nishan-e-Khidmat: 2024
