= Development programs in Tribal Areas =

Development programs in Tribal Areas are the various humanitarian, development and relief projects carried out by the Sarhad Rural Support Programme (SRSP) in the Federally Administered Tribal Areas (FATA) of Pakistan.

While individual projects are entirely independent and distinct, they all follow the Rural Support Programmes (RSP) approach to development, by producing outlines incrementally rather than going in with a blueprint.

== Origin and approach ==
At the behest of Governor Lt. Gen Ali Muhammad Jan Aurakzai of Khyber Pakhtunkhwa Province (KP) it was decided that the Rural Support Programmes (RSP) would be extended to all of FATA through the Sarhad Rural Support Programme (SRSP), thus the FATA Programmes were initiated.

The FATA Programmes adopt an incremental approach of first building trust and then coming up with human res

ource policies and grafting on traditions.

== The FATA Programmes ==
Over the years the FATA Programmes have consisted of the following projects amongst others:

=== FATA Integrated Area Development Project ===
With financial assistance from the Canadian International Development Agency (CIDA) the project ran from 2009 to 2013 in Kurram Agency and Frontier Region (FR) Peshawar. It focused on five components including community institution building, community infrastructure, social sector services, strengthening livelihoods and policy advocacy for influencing pro-poor policy.

=== Relief Assistance for IDP ===
With financial assistance from the United Nations High Commissioner for Refugees (UNHCR) and the KfW Development Bank (KfW) the ongoing project focuses on shelter construction, non-food items distribution and the registration of those returning home after displacement.

=== Developmental Initiative for Refugee Affected Hosting Areas ===
With financial assistance from Deutsche Gesellschaft für Internationale Zusammenarbeit (GIZ) the ongoing project aims to promote, develop and rebuild communities in areas that previously hosted, or continue to host Afghan Nationals or Afghans Refugees. It focuses on resuming access to critical infrastructure schemes and social sector services and establish livelihood opportunities.

=== Rural Livelihood & Community Infrastructure Project ===
With assistance from the FATA Secretariat the project ran from 2013 to 2015 and aimed at strengthening the local communities in an effort to revive collective action, enhance social cohesion and augment grass roots representation in participatory planning and implementation.

=== Reintegration and Rehabilitation of Temporarily Displaced Persons in the FATA ===
With financial assistance from the KfW Development Bank (KfW) of Germany, the project is being implemented with the support of the FATA Secretariat. The project commenced in 2016 and is scheduled to extend into the next four years. It aims to facilitate the reintegration of displaced persons by supporting livelihood, financing reconstruction of essential infrastructure and creating income earning opportunities for dislocated people in the Federally Administered Tribal Areas (FATA).

=== Aid to Uprooted People in Pakistan ===
With financial assistance of € 22 million from the European Union (EU) the project commenced in 2017 and is scheduled to end in 2021. The overall objective of the project is to facilitate the reintegration of FATA IDP's by creating a favourable environment for their return, improve the service delivery of the FATA Administration and assist the reform process in FATA. The project will also support and sustain community-driven local development initiatives to create a favourable socioeconomic environment for returning Internally Displaced Persons. More than 300,000 families are expected to benefit from the project interventions. Project activities will initially start in Khyber Agency, Orakzai Agency, North Waziristan and South Waziristan and later on extended to other agencies.
