= Earthquake Relief and Rehabilitation Project =

Earthquake Relief and Rehabilitation Project (ERRP) was a project undertaken by the Sarhad Rural Support Programme (SRSP) for the relief and rehabilitation of the people of Hazara, Pakistan following the devastating earthquake of 8 October 2005 in the region.

== Project details ==
The 8 October 2005 earthquake was the worst natural disaster in Pakistan's history. A 7.6 magnitude earthquake struck the Indian-Pakistani border with more than 140 aftershocks, causing extensive damage.

The Earthquake Relief and Rehabilitation Project was launched by SRSP for the relief and rehabilitation of the affected. With financial assistance from the Kreditanstalt fur Wiederaufbau (KfW) and the Pakistan Poverty Alleviation Fund (PPAF) over 63,000 houses, were built in Mansehra, Battagram and other quake-affected parts of NWFP. During the post-earthquake period, the project also focused on building community infrastructure. The implementing partners role was that of a catalyst organization: promoting social mobilization, cultivate social activists, providing technical assistance, etc. Apart from reconstruction of houses, the project funded the training of over 8,500 individuals in masonry, carpentry and steel fixing skills. The project followed an owner-driven reconstruction approach, reflected in the fact that no contractors were involved. The project was able to achieve 96% reconstruction of houses compliant to lintel level with safety standards, through disbursement of a total of PKR 8.73 billion.
