= Community Driven Local Development (KP) =

Community Driven Local Development (CDLD) is a budgetary support programme meant to bring social and structural improvements in Thirteen districts of Khyber Pakhtunkhwa, in Khyber Pakhtunkhwa, Pakistan.

== Scope and purpose ==
It is a public–private partnership, which sets out a fiscal and regulatory framework, encouraging district authorities to work directly with local communities. An inherent aim of the programme is to promote democratic values, women empowerment and Local Development. The selected districts of Khyber Pakhtunkhwa, for implementation of the programme include Chitral, Lower Dir, Malakand, Shangla, Swat, Haripur, Sawabi, Batagram, Nowshehra, Torghar, Buner and Upper Dir.

Authorities aim to achieve sustainable development through a ground-up-approach. The Programme is being implemented on community participation basis. The CDLD programme was rolled out in 2014 by the K-P Government with financial assistance of € 64 million from the European Union. While the social mobilisation process and designing is undertaken by the Sarhad Rural Support Programme (SRSP), identification is done by communities and local councillors and the district administration is overall responsible for project selection and implementation.

== Regularisation Of CDLD Program Staff ==
- Community-driven development
- On May 18, KP Chief Minister Mr. Mehmood Khan his official Visit To Dir Lower acknowledged the role Of Community Driven Local Development Program for its successful model of Implementing Community owned projects and schemes. He announced to regularize CDLD staff for futuristic envisioned social development at gross root level. The regularization Of CDLD staff will greatly effect The Program Sustainability as well as about 300 families of staff members hired through transparent, standard, Merit based Recruitment process and dedicatedly working since 09 years.
