= HBL Microfinance Bank =

Bank in Pakistan

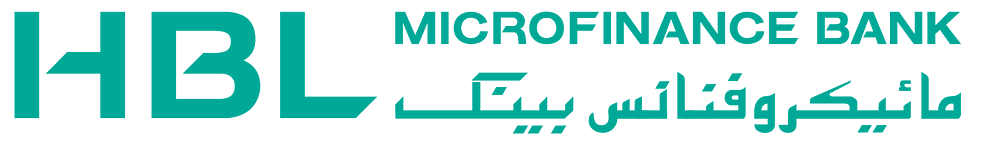
- Company type: Unlisted public company
- Industry: Microfinance
- Founded: 2002; 24 years ago
- Key people: Rayomond Kotwal (chairman); Muhammad Amir Khan (CEO)
- Revenue: ▲ Rs. 35.491 billion (US$130 million) (2023)
- Net income: ▼ Rs. 451.249 million (US$1.6 million) (2023)
- Total assets: ▲ Rs. 157.478 billion (US$560 million) (2023)
- Total equity: ▲ Rs. 14.217 billion (US$51 million) (2023)
- Owner: Habib Bank Limited (79.92%)
- Number of employees: 3,724 (2022)
- Parent: Habib Bank Limited
- Website: hblmfb.com
- Footnotes / references Financials as of 31 December 2023

HBL Microfinance Bank Ltd (HBL MfB) is a Pakistani microfinance bank headquartered in Islamabad. HBL MfB operates over 200 locations all over Pakistan. It is one of the oldest microfinance bank in the country with its roots in the credit and saving section of the Agha Khan Rural Support Program (AKRSP).

== History ==
HBL Microfinance Bank (HBL MfB) was founded as The First MicroFinanceBank Ltd, Pakistan (FMFB-P) in 2002. It was created through a structured transformation of the credit and savings section of the Aga Khan Rural Support Programme (AKRSP), a development programme active in Gilgit-Baltistan and Chitral.

== Major Shareholding ==
HBL has a majority stake in the bank.

Major Shareholding
Shareholding	Percent Stake
Habib Bank Limited (HBL)	76.42%
Aga Khan Agency for Microfinance (AKAM)	14.16%
Aga Khan Rural Support Programme (AKRSP)	5.23%
Japan International Cooperation Agency (JICA)	4.19%
