= Rajiv Gandhi Mahila Vikas Pariyojana =

Poverty reduction institution in India

- Founded: 2002
- Type: Non-governmental organization
- Purpose: Women's empowerment, Poverty reduction
- Location: Uttar Pradesh, India
- Region served: Uttar Pradesh India
- Method: Community Mobilization, Capacity Building
- Key people: P. Sampath Kumar, CEO
- Website: www.rgmvp.org

The Rajiv Gandhi Mahila Vikas Pari Yojana (RGMVP) is the flagship program of Rajiv Gandhi Charitable Trust, a registered non-profit institution, working for poverty reduction, women empowerment, and rural development in Uttar Pradesh, India, since 2002. RGMVP believes that "the poor have a strong desire and innate ability to overcome poverty." It aims to organize poor rural women into community institutions and promotes financial inclusion, health care, livelihood enhancement, education, and the environment.

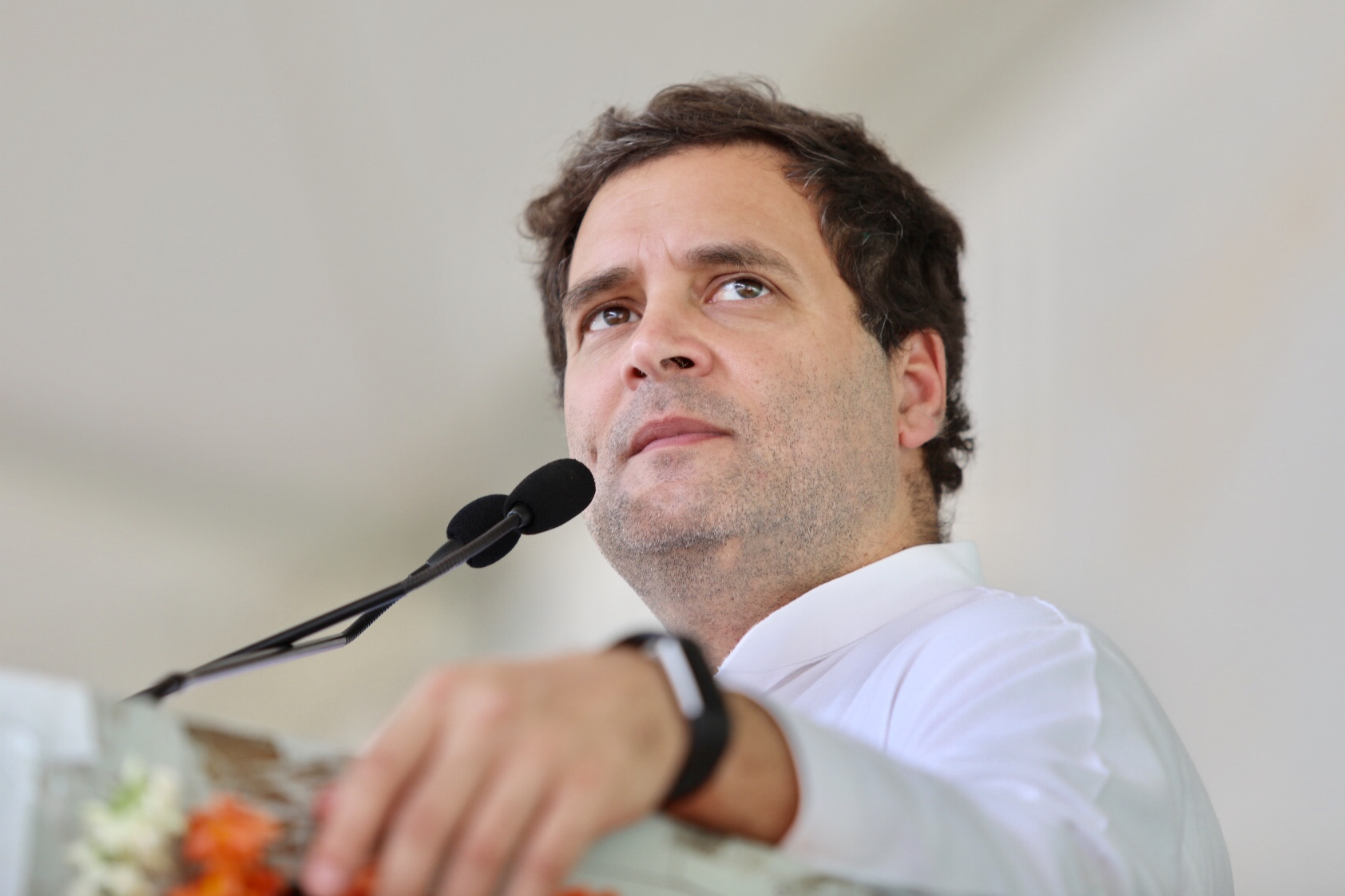
RGMVP represents Rahul Gandhi’s vision of women as independent and of communities as empowered. He is a trustee of the programme.

== Model and strategies ==
=== Community Institutions of the Poor ===
RGMVP aims to organize rural women and build their institutions to enable them to overcome poverty and channel their collective strength to access information, services, and entitlements. These institutions are organized in a three-tier system of Self-Help Groups (SHGs), Village Organizations (VOs), and Block Organizations (BOs). An SHG usually consists of 10–20 women, typically from similar socio-economic and weak financial backgrounds. All SHGs mobilized at the village level are federated into Village Organizations (VOs), representing 150 to 250 poor families drawn from 10 to 20 SHGs. The VOs in turn are federated into Block Organizations (BOs) representing 5000 to 7000 women. These institutions aim to act as a systemic interface between poor people and development initiatives.

=== Strategies ===
The key strategies of RGMVP include social mobilization, the building of social capital, synergy, and convergence, scaling up, and the saturation approach.

== Programmes ==
=== Financial inclusion ===
RGMVP enables the poor to build capital through their own savings within the SHGs and access credit through SHG-bank linkages. It has garnered support from 17 rural and central banks in its project areas.

=== Livelihoods ===
The main focus of RGMVP is on the promotion of income generation activities by providing backward linkages to the livelihood activities through specific initiatives on agriculture and dairy, livestock management, and non-farm activities to ensure that the family has at least two or three sources of income.

1. Agriculture and dairy: Under the agriculture and dairy initiative women are trained in making organic compost, sustainable agricultural practices such as the System of Rice Intensification (SRI) and System of Wheat Intensification (SWI), and the best practices of dairy management. RGMVP also aims to promote Farmers' Clubs.
2. Livestock management: This initiative focuses on supplementary livelihoods such as goat-rearing, bee-keeping, and poultry by facilitating access to sources and training activities.
3. Non-farm sector: RGMVP tried to encourage poor women to explore opportunities in the non-farm sector by providing training in activities such as stitching and embroidery, food preservation, cane furniture making, mechanical knitting, leather work, pottery making, detergent making, etc.

== Outreach ==
Based out of Raebareli, RGMVP has (as of September 2012) reached out to around 500,000 economically weak households in 191 blocks of 39 districts in the most backward and poverty-stricken regions of Uttar Pradesh.

== Partners ==
The project has been partnered with the National Bank for Agriculture and Rural Development and SERP for the promotion of credit linkage and federation of SHGs in select districts of Uttar Pradesh. For its community mobilisation project on maternal and neonatal health RGMVP has partnered with the Bill and Melinda Gates Foundation through a consortium headed up by the Public Health Foundation of India (PHFI) and including the Population Council, the Community Empowerment Lab, and the Center for Global Health and Development at Boston University.

== See also ==
- Women in India
- Poverty reduction
- Millennium Development Goals
- Community economic development
- Social responsibility
- Rajiv Gandhi Charitable Trust
