= Balochistan Rural Support Programme =

Non-profit organization in Pakistan

- Founded: 1983
- Type: Non-Profit Organization
- Purpose: Improving the quality of life of the rural poor by harnessing the potential of people.
- Location: BRSP House 5-A, Gulshan-i-Janan Street Sariab Road, Quetta, Balochistan, Pakistan.
- Origins: Quetta
- Region served: Zhob; Pishin; Qilla Saifullah; Loralai; Kharan; Khuzdar; Chaghai; Washuk; Jhal Magsi; Jaffarabad; Nushki; Qilla Abdullah; Ziarat; Kalat; Mastung; Bolan
- Employees: 300+
- Website: www.brsp.org.pk
- Formerly called: Pak-German Self Help Project. (till 1991)

Balochistan Rural Support Programme (BRSP) was a project funded by the German technical cooperation agency Deutsche Gesellschaft für Internationale Zusammenarbeit (GIZ) in the early 1980s which was converted into the Balochistan Rural Support Programme in 1991. It is a Non Government Organization (NGO), part of the Rural Support Programmes Network, working in rural areas of Balochistan, Pakistan.

In the mid-1990s, BRSP worked in 13 Districts of Balochistan with 250 staff members; however, it had to scale down its operations substantially in the subsequent years as GIZ withdrew its support. BRSP resumed its operations in 2001 with financial support from Pakistan Poverty Alleviation Fund (PPAF).

== Origin ==
In 1983, a project with the collaboration of Germany was initiated, being a joint venture of Government of Germany and Government of Pakistan. It was named the Pak-German Self-Help Project. Initially the project was implemented by the Local Government Department of Balochistan with the financial assistance of GIZ. The initiative primarily aimed at developing the socioeconomic conditions of the poor living in rural areas of Balochistan. Later in 1991, it was transformed into a company limited and a non profit organization named as Balochistan Rural Support Programme under the new organizational and administrative setup.

== Vision ==
The vision of the programme is a prosperous Balochistan where people, especially the poor and women, are provided with equal livelihood opportunities and are not socially and economically excluded.

== Mission ==
The mission is to harness potential of the rural poor to help themselves, assume control of local development and improve their standard of living.

== Structure and accountability ==
Balochistan Rural Support Programme is governed by a 15 members board of directors, headed by a chairman. The board is responsible for drawing general policy. The chief executive officer (CEO) is the executive authority in the organisation who is further assisted by senior managers, section managers, deputy managers, assistant managers and so on.

== Major programmes ==
- Social mobilization
- Community physical Infrastructure
- Technology development
- Provision of basic health facilities
- Provision of basic education facilities
- Community mobilization
- Capacity building of community institutions
- Development and rehabilitation of water supply schemes and construction and provision of sanitation services
- Youth development centers
- Livelihood enhancement program

== Program philosophy ==
Balochistan Rural Support Programmes primary role in poverty alleviation and community development is to encourage self-help and, in the long term, guide the Community Organizations (CO's) in becoming mature and self-reliant institutions. The Rural Support Programmes that this is the route to community empowerment, which must arise organically from CO's themselves. BRSP’s programme is holistic and multi sectoral aiming to ensure sustainable outcomes. BRSP holds that unless the concept of gender is understood and mainstreamed into every aspect of the organization and the programme, the kind of development, poverty alleviation and community empowerment that it wishes to attain will not be possible. This must be done in culturally appropriate ways.

== Sources of funds ==
Balochistan Rural Support Programmes has received funding from various national and international donor agencies. Amongst others the BRSP has received funding from the UNHCR, WFP, UNICEF, GIZ, PPAF, EU, KfW, EC, RSPN, MC, UNFPA, FAO, and UNDP.

== Emergency response ==
BRSP initiated and implemented emergency response to the 2007 floods of Balochistan, 2008 earthquake of Ziarat, 2010 Pakistan floods and the 2013 Mashkhel earthquake in all these disasters Balochistan was badly affected.

== Honors and recognition ==
- Balochistan Rural Support Programme received its first Pakistan Centre for Philanthropy (PCP) certification in 2005 and has been receiving the certification consecutively. The last certification was received in September 2012. PCP certification is given to an organization on the basis of its performance in achieving its objectives and goals, financial management, parameters of internal government and programme delivery.
- On March 5, 2013, Federal Minister for Education and Training, Government of Pakistan, Sheikh Waqas Akram, conferred on BRSP the Afro-Asian Rural Development Organization (AARDO), award for outstanding contribution for development.

== Timeline ==
- 1991–2000: During the span of eight years BRSP supported target communities to form, formalize, and strengthen 473 villages of Balochistan province which included; 317 Village Organization (VO's) and 156 Women Organizations (WO's). However the organization had to scaled down its operations in the subsequent years as GTZ withdrew its support.
- 2001–2006: From 2001, BRSP expanded its operations into 13 districts of the province focusing on social mobilization, micro credit, community physical infrastructure, natural resource management, and social sector services.
- 2007–2010: In this period BRSP experienced further programmatic expansion in four more districts with support of international and national donor agencies. A major livestock program was initiated during this phase with the support of Ministry of Food, Agriculture and Livestock (MINFAL), Pakistan.

== See also ==
- Sarhad Rural Support Programme
- Aga Khan Rural Support Programme
