= People's Primary Healthcare Initiative KP =

Pakistan provincial initiative

The People's Primary Healthcare Initiative KP (PPHI), also known as Khyber Pakhtunkhwa Health Programme, aims to enhance primary healthcare services at the grassroots level in Khyber Pakhtunkhwa province, Pakistan. Its primary objective is to improve healthcare accessibility and outcomes for patients in the province.

== Features ==
The People's Primary Healthcare Initiative (PPHI) in Khyber Pakhtunkhwa and other parts of the country was established in response to a World Bank report based on the World Health Organization's health model. It focuses on shifting the healthcare system from primarily curative approaches to a more preventive and promotive model of care.

The provincial government awarded contracts to the non-governmental organisations to manage BHUs by improving presence of staff, equipment and medicines. The organisations act as consultants, as they receive the total budget of the districts and fill vacant posts and make prompt purchases of medicines, equipments etc. to insure that patients get treatment. The programme offers grant incentives to doctors and other healthcare staff by attracting them to serve in the rural and remote areas of the province.

In Khyber-Pakhtunkhwa (K-P), the management of primary healthcare infrastructure was transferred to the Sarhad Rural Support Programme (SRSP) from 2007 to 2016. There are over 625 basic health units (BHU's) across Khyber Pakhtunkhwa and in agencies of the Federally Administered Tribal Areas (FATA).

In 2016 a legal and administrative disagreement arose between the PTI lead Provincial Government and the Sarhad Rural Support Programme (SRSP). It was decided that the programme would devolve back to the administrative control of the Health Department.

== See also ==
- Healthcare in Pakistan
