= Aga Khan Rural Support Programme =

Non-profit organization in Pakistan

The Aga Khan Rural Support Programme (AKRSP) is a private, non-profit organization, established by the Aga Khan Foundation in 1982 to help improve the quality of life of the villagers of Gilgit-Baltistan and Chitral. It is a non-governmental organization which is part of the Rural Support Programmes Network in Pakistan.

== Philosophy ==
AKRSP's development approach gives primacy to the people and their abilities. It is based on the belief that local communities have tremendous potential to plan and manage their own social development, once they are organized and provided access to necessary skills and capital. The organisations proclivity for a participatory approach found much support in Shoaib Sultan, the founding General Manager of AKRSP.

== Achievements ==
AKRSP's past efforts have led to many notable achievements in social and economic domains. Key achievements include manifold increase in incomes, construction/rehabilitation of more than 4000 small infrastructure projects (bridges, roads, irrigation channels, hydropower units and other small projects). The planting of tens of millions of trees and the development of hundreds of acres of marginal lands, developing a cadre of more than 50,000 community activists, mobilization of nearly $5 million village savings, and the establishment of more than 4,993 community organisations. AKRSP supported community organisations, which have established patterns of local governance that are participatory, democratic, transparent and accountable to their members, are now federating at the union council level to establish Local Support Organization (LSOs). Currently, there 67 LSOs across Gilgit-Baltistan and Chitral that are forging direct partnerships with government departments, local development partners, donors and the private sector actors to increase the scope and outreach of services for their member communities.

It has since won a number of awards, including the 2005 Global Development Awards for Most Innovative Development Project and an Ashden Award for Sustainable Energy in 2004.

== See also ==
- Rural Support Programmes Network
- Balochistan Rural Support Programme
- Sarhad Rural Support Programme
- First MicroFinance Bank-Pakistan
- Aga Khan Development Network
