= Strengthening Participatory Organization =

Strengthening Participatory Organization is the largest rights-based national support organization in Pakistan working since 1994 to strengthen and support community organizations and public interest institutions for promotion of democratic governance, social justice, peace and social harmony. SPO engages civil society networks, faith-based organisations and groups representing a wide range of stakeholders.

SPO focuses on capacity building of community institutions and nurtures civil society networks at the grassroots. SPO has so far worked in 77 districts out of 110 across four provinces and trained more than 3,000 community-based and local government institutions, strengthened 56 rights-based advocacy networks and undertook special projects for girls, education and humanitarian relief in case of natural disasters. All special projects are run with the help of community partners.

SPO envisions a democratic, socially just and tolerant society guided by participatory principles, which realizes the full potential of its people and their aspirations for sustainable and self-reliant development.

The mission is to strengthen and support community organisations and public interest institutions of Pakistan for the benefit of poor and disadvantaged sections of society for sustainable development through a participatory approach.

== History ==
Strengthening Participatory Organization began its life in the early 1990s as the Small Projects Office (SPO) of the Canadian International Development Agency (CIDA) programme in Pakistan. On January 15, 1994, the Small Projects Office was transformed into an indigenous NGO. The decade since that inception has seen many more transformations and developments.

From its humble beginning as a small and very new NGO in 1994, Strengthening Participatory Organization has grown to become one of the leading NGOs in Pakistan - in terms of its size and resources, the scope of its activities, its reach across the country, and the impact of its work. SPO did not start off as strengthening in participatory organization. Its original role was limited and temporary:to function as a Small Project Office for the Social Sector Funds (SSF) Project of the Canadian International Development Agency (CIDA). But in the eight years that follow the small project office acquired a life and niche of its own. But by end of this period it has transformed into an independent organization working for a different and deeper mandate than the one with which it had begun. This chapter becomes SPO's eight years growth to maturity and transformation from a small, project support office to a prominent contributor to participatory development in Pakistan.

== Aims and objectives ==
It is estimated that some 1,500,000 people have benefited directly through SPO's training programme and projects and another one million indirectly.

A few achievements of SPO's programme are listed below:

=== Empowering women ===
Increased number of women organisations have been strengthened, providing a platform to women to play an active role in integrating their own concerns in the overall planning process. The confidence of women has increased and their involvement in decision-making ensured. Women have been especially sensitised for good governance and provided political education so that they can play a role in the local government. Choti funding has also spurred economic activities that benefit female community members.

=== Promoting development ===
SPO's partner organisations demonstrated maturity in planning and undertaking development activities—over 300 CBOs and WOs designed development projects that addressed key needs of their communities. They were able to secure funds for these projects from SPO as well as other donors such as Trust for Voluntary Organisations (TVO), The Canada Fund and other bilateral donors. At least 30 percent of the beneficiaries of these projects hailed from the poorest segments of the target communities and no less than 30 percent were women. The POs also involved a large number of the intended beneficiaries in project needs, assessment, design and management. Environmental safeguards were built in.

=== Changing attitudes ===
Through SPO's interventions, an attitudinal change in society was observed where people demand that their basic needs are fulfilled and seen as their rights, rather than taking the fulfilment of such needs as a privilege. In order to strengthen advocacy for change, civil society organisations were linked with regional and sectoral networks to play a leading role in representing grass root communities. This further increased the participation of communities in decision-making.

=== Promoting policy debate ===
SPO has grown as an institution with the ability to develop linkages among grass root communities and policy-making institutions. Until now, SPO has engaged local communities to assist government in policy development processes including devolution of power plan, youth policy, education policy and repealing Hudood Ordinances. These networks gave their input at the policy level in provincial and national forums. Wide-ranging consultation processes were initiated by SPO across Pakistan. Representatives of government, NGOs, CBOs and the communities extensively attended consultative workshops.

=== Rights-based political education and supporting democracy ===
The POs played a vital role in order to provide women leadership in the first two phases of local bodies elections and the last two general elections. In order to ensure effective participation of women, the minimum female participation of 33% was achieved in Punjab through advocacy campaigns in collaboration with other agencies. SPO's local resource persons were also actively involved in 46 districts. 781 members of SPO partner organisations contested the elections, out of which, 536 were elected from all over the country. After reduction in seats more than 400 got elected in the second round. A larger number of activists participated in the process through campaigning, canvassing and bringing the development agenda to the fore. SPO can justifiably claim to have acted as a catalyst for smooth implementation of the new local government system.

SPO has established a mechanism through its local partner networks to collect feedback on government policies, review performance and propose alternative solutions. During the last year, SPO partner networks conducted research based studies in the areas of health and education.

Some interventions with political parties in 10 districts of all four provinces have provided an opportunity to establish a mechanism to communicate priorities and expectations of civil society to political leadership.

=== Reviving communities affected by natural disasters ===
SPO is very much rooted in the local communities in at least half of the districts of Pakistan. In any situation of emergency or disasters, it stands by these communities through developing and implementing relief and rehabilitation programme. During one of the most severe earthquakes of human history, which affected the lives of people in northern Pakistan, SPO was the only leading organisation, which utilized its full potential to mobilize resources in a very short time. The resources both cash and in kind were worth 40 million rupees. A number of small initiatives were undertaken in collaboration with other partners for communities in the areas of education and health. SPO has also provided massive support to flood affected communities in Turbat, Bolan, Gwadar, Naseerabad, Jaffarabad, Thatta, Badin, Swat and Rawalpindi (districts across four provinces). SPO was the first organisation to train the implementing partners of Earthquake Reconstruction and Rehabilitation Authority (ERRA), including the army, in community mobilisation and the only national organisation to work at the policy level with the newly formed National Disaster Management Authority (NDMA).

== Programmes ==
=== Democratic Governance Programme ===
The Democratic Governance Programme emphasises on mainstreaming of marginalised communities in decision making processes by working towards the realisation of the basic human rights as described in the Universal Declaration of Human Rights (UDHR) and the Constitution of Pakistan. It ultimately leads to the next stage of claiming rights from policy and decision making institutions in a democratic manner. It is achieved through extensive political education through Civil Society Networks on regular basis. Enabling the people through education and training to participate fully in all forms of voluntary activities for social development is encouraged. Youth, the most vibrant section of the society is engaged and mainstreamed in social and political processes through this programme.

=== Social Justice Programme ===
The Social Justice Programme is a mean to establish and expedite the community-rooted mechanisms in order to secure the well being of people, irrespective of caste, creed, colour or sex, by improving their quality of life. The programme aims to support mechanisms largely in the public sector and those devised by the civil society in the areas of basic education, primary healthcare, livelihood support to women and relief and rehabilitation after natural disasters in areas where SPO works.

=== Peace and Social Harmony Programme ===
The Peace and Social Harmony Programme encourages civil society networks, faith-based organisations and groups, representing a wide range of stakeholders, to jointly participate in decision-making processes for the protection of basic rights regardless of religion, language, ethnicity and class differences. The programme is based on building social harmony among diversified groups to share and understand each other's point of view and respect differences. The major challenges to be dealt with include the rising sectarian differences and inter-provincial harmony. ‘Politics of Consent, is encouraged resulting in informed, thoroughly debated, and positive public and policy messages of awareness raising and advocacy.

== Coverage ==
SPO is working in the following districts:

- Balochistan (18 districts):

Awaran, Bolan, Chaghai, Gwadar, Jaffarabad, Kech, Lasbella, Loralai, Mastung, Naseerabad, Nushki, Khuzdar, Panjgur, Pishin, Quetta, Sibi, Washuk, Ziarat

- NWFP (9 districts and FATA):

Charsadda, Chitral, Dir, Dera Ismail Khan, Malakand, Mardan, Peshawar, Swat, Shangla, FATA (Khyber, Orakzai and Mohmand Agencies)

- Punjab (14 districts):

Bahawalpur, Bhakkar, Dera Ghazi Khan, Gujranwala, Khanewal, Khushab, Lahore, Layyah, Lodhran, Mianwali, Multan, Muzaffargarh, Sargodha, Vehari

- Sindh (12 districts):

Badin, Hyderabad, Ghotki, Karachi, Matiari, Mirpurkhas, Nawabshah, Shikarpur, Tando Allahyar, Tando Muhammad Khan, Thatta, Umerkot

== Offices ==
SPO manages and implements its programmes through nine permanent and three temporary project offices:

- National Center (Islamabad)
- Balochistan (Quetta and Turbat)
- NWFP (Peshawar and Dera Ismail Khan)
- Punjab (Lahore and Multan)
- Sindh (Karachi and Hyderabad)
- Project Offices in Azad Kashmir (Muzaffarabad, Bagh Neelum and in Sukkur Sindh)
