= National Solidarity Program =

The National Solidarity Program(me) may refer to:

- Afghan National Solidarity Programme (2002-2017)
- National Solidarity Program (Mexico) (1989–1995)
