= National Revolutionary Socialist Party =

National Revolutionary Socialist Party (NRSP) was a political party in Kerala, India. NRSP emerged through a split in the Revolutionary Socialist Party.

NRSP contested the 1977 state legislative election as an ally of Communist Party of India (Marxist) (CPI(M)). The party had one candidate, R.M. Parameswaran in Eravipuram. Parameswaran got 22 666 votes, but lost to the RSP incumbent R.S. Unni.

Ahead of the 1982 election, alliances had switched. RSP had joined the Left Democratic Front whereas NRSP had joined the United Democratic Front. NRSP ran one candidate in the election, R.M. Parameswaran who now contested in Vamamapuram, getting 34 349 votes. He was defeated by a CPI(M) candidate.
