= Pakistan Poverty Alleviation Fund =

Poverty alleviation Not-for-Profit company based in Pakistan

Pakistan Poverty Alleviation Fund (PPAF) is a Pakistani not-for-profit company based on the model of public-private partnership. PPAF aims to promote an effective approach to poverty alleviation across Pakistan. A number of leading multilateral, bilateral, and international corporate institutions such as the World Bank contribute to PPAF’s poverty reduction goal by providing financial support and funds to promote grassroot development. This 'Fund' mostly helps by providing microfinance loans (very small loans) to the very poor households to help lift them out of poverty.

== Poverty statistics and challenges ==
According to a World Bank report released in June 2025, approximately 45% of Pakistan’s population is now living below the poverty line. The revised estimate is based on an updated poverty threshold and survey data from 2018–19. The report also highlighted a significant increase in the proportion of people living in extreme poverty — rising from 4.9% to 16.5%. These figures underscore the growing challenges faced by institutions such as the Pakistan Poverty Alleviation Fund (PPAF), which plays a critical role in addressing multidimensional poverty, supporting community-driven development, and delivering targeted interventions to uplift vulnerable segments of society.

== Achievements and recognition ==
Pakistan Poverty Alleviation Fund (PPAF) is the leading agency for poverty reduction in Pakistan.

- In 2017, 'PPAF' won the Outstanding Achievement Award at the Global Diversity & Inclusion Benchmarks (GDIB) Conference held in Karachi, Pakistan

The Government of Pakistan also provides large amounts of money every year from its budget (Pakistani Rupees 1.584 Billion granted in 2016) to Pakistan Poverty Alleviation Fund. Large Pakistani corporations and wealthy individuals in Pakistan also contribute to the 'Fund'.

== See also ==
- Balochistan Rural Support Programme
- Sarhad Rural Support Programme
