= Community-driven development =

Community-driven development (CDD) is an initiative in the field of development that provides control of the development process, resources and decision making authority directly to groups in the community. The underlying assumption of CDD projects are that communities are the best judges of how their lives and livelihoods can be improved and, if provided with adequate resources and information, they can organize themselves to provide for their immediate needs. CDD projects work by providing poor communities with direct funding for development with the communities then deciding how to spend the money. Lastly, the community plans and builds the project and takes responsibility for monitoring its progress.

== Characteristics of CDD ==
CDD programmes are motivated by their trust in people (Naidoo and Finn, 2001) and hence it advocates people changing their own environment as a powerful force for development.

By treating poor people as assets and partners in the development process, studies have shown that CDD is responsive to local demands, inclusive, and more cost-effective compared to centrally-led NGO-based programmes. CDD can also be supported by strengthening and financing community groups, facilitating community access to information, and promoting an enabling environment through policy and institutional reform

Following from this description, field practitioners at the World Bank have denoted five key characteristics of CDD projects.

1. A CDD operation primarily targets a community-based organization or a representative local council of a community. This community focus means that the essential defining characteristic of a CDD project is that the beneficiaries or grantees of implementations are agents of the community. Since the focus on small communities is so large the CDD normally targets small scale subprojects in the community.
2. In CDD operations, community- or locally based representation is responsible for designing and planning the subprojects in a participatory manner. Since the concentration on participatory planning is considerable in CDD operations, often the possible types of subproject investment options are very large with only a small list of subprojects that cannot be carried out.
3. The defining characteristic of CDD projects is that a transfer of resources to the community occurs and control of the resources is delegated to the community. The amount of transfer and control of resources will depend on the CDD implementations.
4. The community is directly involved in the implementation of the subproject. Often the participation of the community comes directly in the form of labour or funds. However, the community may also contribute to the subproject indirectly in the form of management and supervision of contractors or the operation and maintenance of the infrastructure when complete.
5. An element of community-based monitoring and evaluation has become a characteristic of CDD subprojects. Most often it is social accountability tools such as participatory monitoring, community scorecards and grievance redress systems which allow for the community to ensure accountability of the CDD implementation.

== CDD vs. CBD ==
Community-driven development is derived from community-based development (CBD) which can include a much broader range of projects. For example, CBD projects can include everything from simple information sharing to social, economic and political empowerment of community groups. However, CDD projects fit on the empowerment end of CBD by actively engaging beneficiaries in the design, management and implementation of projects. The stress on actual control of decision-making and project resources at nearly all stages of a subproject cycle distinguishes CDD from the previous generation of CBD projects. In this continuum of community participation covered by CBD, new-generation CDD projects are located at the extreme right (Tanaka, 2006).

Since community-driven development has only recently diverged from the broad community-based development there are a few contrasts visible in the five characteristics of CDD programmes. In essence, all five properties of CDD projects exist together only in the newer generation of CDD implementations. Nevertheless, the first attribute of community focus would apply to all CDD projects and CBD projects. In contrast, the second characteristic of participatory planning and design and the fourth property of community involvement are often visible among all CDD projects but very rarely in CBD projects. Moreover, community-based monitoring and evaluation which is the fifth aspect of CDD projects is only found in some of the newer projects. The fifth characteristic is what positions many of the newer CDD projects in the extreme right of the CDD cluster as diagrammatically demonstrated in Figure 1. As mentioned above, the third characteristic of community control of resources seems to be the key factor to conceptually distinguish between CDD and CBD projects. However, many of the early NGOs implementing CDD projects did not always interpret this factor rigorously (Tanaka, 2006). Thus, the distinction between CDD projects and CBD projects with CDD components was not always clear; however, this would be expected since there was a gradual evolution of CDD out of CBD.

To alleviate the earlier problems of over-reliance on central governments as the main service provider, CDD programs were launched by the World Bank to improve the accountability and services in key areas. However, NGOs quickly learned that well designed and implemented CDD programmes had ripple effects of promoting equity and inclusiveness, efficiency and good governance. By effectively targeting and including the vulnerable and excluded groups, as well as allowing communities to manage and control resources directly it was evident that CDD programs could allow poverty reduction projects to scale up quickly. Efficiency is gained through demand responsive allocation of resources, reduced corruption and misuse of resources, lower costs and better cost recovery, better quality and maintenance, greater utilization of resources, and the community's willingness to pay for goods and services. Good governance is promoted by greater transparency, accountability in allocation and use of resources because the community participates in project decision-making processes. Some of the principles of CDD—such as participation, empowerment, accountability, and nondiscrimination—are also worthy ends in themselves (Asian Development Bank, 2008).

It was as early as 1881 when T.H. Green who wrote about the maximum power for all members of human society alike to make the best of themselves (Zakaria, 1999). However, it was not until the 1970s with John Rawls’ book ―A Theory of Justice and in the 1990s with Amartya Sen's book ―Development as Freedom where the notions of substantive freedom and the multidimensional nature of poverty were made explicit to the multilateral development banks. This recognition of the multidimensional nature of poverty as well as the combined failures of both markets and governments and the socio-political complexity of ground level realities has made it clear that relying on traditional top-down, state-led, ―big development‖ strategies would not be effective to combat poverty. Moreover, this resurgence in participatory development and bottom-up approaches in the NGO and development sector has come in only the last two decades as explained above.

== Expansion of community-driven development ==
Since the mid-1990s, community-driven development has emerged as one of the fastest-growing investments by NGOs, aid organizations and multilateral development banks. This continued investment in CDD has been driven mostly by a demand from donor agencies and developing countries for large-scale, bottom-up and demand-driven, poverty reduction subprojects that can increase the institutional capacity of small communities for self-development. The success and scale of some CDD projects in the World Bank are especially notable. The World Bank supported approximately 190 lending projects amounting to $9.3 billion in 2000–2005 (Tanaka, 2006). Initiated by the International Development Association (IDA) at the World Bank, CDD projects have been instrumental in harnessing the energy and capacity of communities for poverty reduction. Since the start of this decade, IDA lending for CDD has averaged annually just over 50 operations, for an average total of US$1.3 billion per year (International Development Association, 2009).

Even the Asian Development Bank (ADB) has funded 57 projects worth about $2.5 billion between 2001 and 2007 that included community-driven development approaches to enhance delivery of inputs and beneficiary participation. They constituted 14% of the total loans approved by the Asian Development Bank during this period. Over one-third of the projects were in the agriculture and natural resources sector, followed by a smaller proportion of water supply and sanitation, waste management, education and health projects. The projects were primarily in Southeast Asia, South Asia, and Central and West Asia, where the developing country governments were investing in rural development programs (Asian Development Bank, 2008).

In the last few years the International Fund for Agricultural Development has been working with the Agence française de développement (AFD), the African Development Bank (AfDB), the European Union (EU), the Food and Agriculture Organization of the United Nations (FAO), the UN Capital Development Fund (UNCDF) and the World Bank to create a platform for learning and sharing knowledge on community-driven development (International Fund for Agricultural Development, 2010). Intensive forms of community participation have been attempted in projects of several donors for many years. Bilateral donors, such as the Department for International Development (DFID) of the United Kingdom and the Canadian International Development Agency (CIDA), have used CDD-type approaches for a long time as part of their sustainable livelihoods and integrated basic needs development assistance in developing countries. The Swedish International Development Agency (SIDA) and Danish International Development Agency have used CDD principles in the mandate of a rights-based approach to the development projects they fund (FAO, 2010).

More than 80 countries have now implemented CDD projects. The breadth and activities funded by the CDD programs at the World Bank can be explained by providing a brief overview of a few of them.

The Second National Fadama Development Project II (NFDP-II) targets the development of small scale irrigation, especially in the low-lying alluvial floodplains or "Fadama‖. NFDP-II increased the productivity, living standards and development capacity of the economically active rural communities while increasing the efficiency in delivering implementation services to an estimated four million rural beneficiary households and raising the real incomes of households by 45 percent (African Development Bank, 2003). The Social Fund for Development in Yemen provided support 7 million people of which 49 percent were female and generated 8,000 permanent jobs. It also increased the number of girls‘ schools from 502 to 554 and basic education enrollment rates from 63 percent to 68 percent. The program focuses on helping the poor to help themselves through providing income-generating activities and building community infrastructure rather than making cash transfers (El-Gammal, 2004). The Social Investment Fund Project V in Honduras benefited 2.5 million people with the implementation of 2,888 projects (1,446 rehabilitated schools, about 700 new schools, 163 new health centers, 347 small water/sanitation systems, and 461 latrines) resulting in all children in the targeted areas attending primary school. In addition the project communities were provided with better access to health care assistance and access to running water (Perez de Castillo, 1998). The Andhra Pradesh Rural Poverty Reduction Project (APRPRP) in India has helped to organize 10.1 million rural poor women into community-based organizations that collectively save over US$770 million and leverage credit over $2.7 billion from commercial banks (World Bank, 2003). The Kecamatan Development Program (KDP) in Indonesia which is what the National Solidarity Program in Afghanistan is based on has benefitted 18 million people by providing better services which include more than 37,000 kilometers of local roads and 8,500 bridges, 9,200 clean water supply units, and 3,000 new or improved health posts. In addition, more than 1.3 million people obtained loans to start or complement local businesses through microfinancing (Guggenheim, 2004). Lastly, the National Solidarity Programme (NSP) in Afghanistan will be the focus of this research. In this implementation elected village-level community development councils, which include women, use grants and local labor to rebuild bridges and roads, fix schools and install water pumps to benefit 13 million people across Afghanistan thereby building state credibility and strengthening local democracy.

== Effect of CDD programs on conflict ==
Governments and international organizations persist to address large amounts of development aid to conflict affected areas throughout the world by community-driven development programs, some of it in order to abate conflict by decreasing popular support for insurgent activities. Despite that, the effect of development aid on civil conflict remains unclear. The Philippines’ Kapit-Bisig Laban sa Kahiripan - Comprehensive Integrated Delivery of Social Services (KALAHI-CIDSS) — a large-scale community-driven development program from 2003 through 2008 implemented by the Philippine government's Department of Social Welfare and Development. The program intends to improve local infrastructure, governance, participation, and social cohesion. More than 4000 villages in 184 municipalities across 40 provinces had received aid through KALAHI-CIDSS. (Crost and Johnston, 2010) investigate the effect of a KALAHI-CIDSS development program in the Philippines, and conclude that the program actually intensify violence in the short term. There are at least two possible reasons through which aid could intensify conflict. The first is that an inflow of aid will increase the amount of resources, which in turn increases the incentive to fight. The second is that aid increases short-term conflict because it has the potential to weaken insurgents in the long-run, perhaps because it increases peaceful economic opportunities or popular support for the government. If insurgents expect a successful aid program to weaken their position, they have an incentive to sabotage its implementation by violent means. The National Solidarity Program (NSP), which began in June 2003, is the largest development program in Afghanistan. The program is focused on infrastructure, such as drinking water facilities, irrigation canals and roads, and services, such as training and literacy courses. NSP is executed by the Ministry of Rural Rehabilitation and Development (MRRD) of the Government of Afghanistan, funded by the World Bank and a consortium of bilateral donors, and implemented by around25 NGOs. By mid 2010NSP had already been implemented in over 29,000 villages across 361 of Afghanistan's 398 districts at a cost of nearly $1 billion. The results of NSP show that the program has a significant positive effect on the sense of economic wellbeing among the villagers and their support for the central and local governments. There is also evidence that NSP has positive effect on the perception of security situation by the villagers, but no evidence that this has led to a decrease in insurgent attacks there (Beath, 2011).
