= Rural Support Programmes Network =

Development network in Pakistan

The Rural Support Programmes Network (RSPN) is the largest development network in Pakistan with an outreach to over 34 million rural Pakistanis. It consists of a network of 12 Rural Support Programmes (RSPs). The RSP's rely on a community driven model of development. Communities are mobilised around their needs and organised to stimulate more effective demand for services.

== Philosophy and approach ==
The centre piece of the RSP approach is social mobilisation of the poor in order to enable them to participate directly in decisions that affect their lives and prospects. Communities are mobilised and asked to indicate their priorities through a process of dialogue, catalysed by the programmes. They are then encouraged to assume responsibility for implementing and maintaining the projects, reflecting their own priorities, with technical and financial support being extended by the programmes.

The model upholds civil society as central to addressing the economic, socio-political and cultural causes of poverty. It also subverts the conventional model of social development, which assumed that either central government or outside agencies would lift people out of poverty.

== Role of RSPN ==
The RSPN is a strategic platform for the RSP's. It provides capacity building support to them and assists them in policy advocacy and donor linkages. Although all the RSP's are said to be federated under the Rural Support Programme Network. Each RSP is an autonomous organization that develops programmes tailored to local needs, with each RSP having an independent board of directors.

== Network ==
The Rural Support Programmes Network is a network of 12 RSP namely

1. Aga Khan Rural Support Programme (1982)
2. Sarhad Rural Support Programme (1989)
3. Balochistan Rural Support Programme (1991)
4. National Rural Support Programme (1992)
5. Institute of Rural Management (1993)
6. Ghazi Barotha Taraqiati Idara (1995)
7. Lachi Poverty Reduction Programme (1997)
8. Tardeep Rural Development Programme (1997)
9. Punjab Rural Support Programme (1998)
10. Sindh Graduates Association (2001)
11. Sindh Rural Support Organisation (2003)
12. Azad Jammu and Kashmir Rural Support Programme (2005)
