= Social development theory =

Development is a process of social change

Social development theory attempts to explain qualitative changes in the structure and framework of society, that help the society to better realize aims and objectives. Development can be defined in a manner applicable to all societies at all historical periods as an upward ascending movement featuring greater levels of energy, efficiency, quality, productivity, complexity, comprehension, creativity, mastery, enjoyment and accomplishment. Development is a process of social change, not merely a set of policies and programs instituted for some specific results. During the last five centuries this process has picked up in speed and intensity, and during the last five decades has witnessed a marked surge in acceleration.

== Human development ==
Development is a human process, in the sense that human beings, not material factors, drive development. The level of people's education, intensity of their aspiration and energies, quality of their attitudes and values, skills and information all affect the extent and pace of development. These factors come into play whether it is the development of the individual, family, community, nation, or the whole world.

=== Unconscious vs. conscious development ===
Human development normally proceeds from experience to comprehension. As society develops over centuries, it accumulates the experience of countless pioneers. The essence of that experience becomes the formula for accomplishment and success. The fact that experience precedes knowledge can be taken to mean that development is an unconscious process that gets carried out first, while knowledge becomes conscious later on only. Unconscious refers to activities that people carry out without knowing what the end results will be, or where their actions will lead. They carry out the acts without knowing the conditions required for success.
