= Sarhad Rural Support Programme =

Pakistani development network

- Abbreviation: SRSP
- Founded: 1989
- Purpose: Social Mobilization, Poverty Alleviation, Community Physical Infrastructure, Renewable Energy, Microcredit, Social Sector Services, Human Resource Development, Humanitarian Aid
- Region served: Khyber Pakhtunkhwa, Pakistan
- Key people: Shoaib Sultan Khan, Founder and Member Board of Directors; Munawar Humayun Khan, Chairperson; Masood Ul Mulk, Chief Executive Officer
- Website: Official website
- Formerly called: Sarhad Rural Support Cooperation

The Sarhad Rural Support Programme (SRSP) is a non-governmental organization dedicated to alleviating poverty in North West Pakistan. Established in 1989, its mission is to reduce poverty and promote sustainable livelihoods in Khyber Pakhtunkhwa, Pakistan.

SRSP is part of the Rural Support Programmes Network, initiated by Shoaib Sultan Khan, a recipient of the United Nations Environment Programme Global 500 Award.

Today, SRSP stands as the largest regional RSP, with extensive outreach across communities. Due to its wide-reaching presence, SRSP has increasingly taken on a prominent role in responding to disasters affecting Khyber Pakhtunkhwa, making humanitarian relief, in addition to development work, a key area of focus for the organisation.

== Formation ==
SRSP began it operations in 1989. It was established by members of the civil society, members of the government in their individual capacities, and members of the academia, media and training institutions. SRSP was created to replicate the Rural Support Programmes approach from the province now called Khyber Pakhtunkhwa.

== Approach ==
SRSP's framework is based on the Rural Support Programmes (RSP's) approach to community empowerment, and economic and livelihood development. At the heart of this approach is the belief that marginalized communities and disadvantaged people have within them the capacity for self-help. Pakistan’s Rural Support Program (RSP) movement pioneered bottom-up, community-driven development using a flexible, autonomous, politically neutral approach, which has been replicated successfully across PakistanPakistan as well as in India and Bangladesh.

== Programmes ==
SRSP specialises in social mobilisation, gender and development, community infrastructure, education, micro-finance, micro-enterprise development, governance, conflict resolution, humanitarian assistance, and human resource development.

SRSP’s wide array of programmes includes support for developing/sustaining/advancing:

1. Community physical infrastructure
2. Renewable energy
3. Community investment/livelihoods funds, microcredit, village banks
4. Social sector services
5. Human resource development
6. Enterprise and value chain development
7. Development and humanitarian programmes
8. Legal empowerment
9. Education
10. Health care

== Achievements ==
Since its inception, SRSP has emerged as the largest non-government, non-profit organization in Khyber Pakhtunkhwa. It works in 22 out of 25 districts in the province. In 2007 it also initiated a programme for community empowerment and economic development in parts of the Federally Administered Tribal Areas (FATA).

SRSP has organized over 21,000 Community Organizations, covering 500,000 households; one third of the members being women. It has established over 7,000 small-scale infrastructure schemes worth PKR 32.6 billion benefiting a population of more than 10 million. Its major community infrastructure schemes include drinking water supply schemes, farm to market link roads and bridges, sanitation schemes, irrigation channels, micro-hydels, mini dams and rehabilitation of schools. SRSP has also installed more than 180 micro hydro power plants across Khyber Pakhtunkhwa, with production capacities ranging from 20 kilo-watts to 2 mega-watts.

SRSP has played a significant role in leveraging resources and providing humanitarian assistance to disasters affected communities in Khyber Pakhtunkhwa and its contribution has been acknowledged by the Federal and Provincial Government. During the earthquake of 2005, it helped rebuilt 62,000 houses in one of the biggest community driven housing programmes, funded by the Pakistan Poverty Alleviation Programme (PPAF). In addition to this, 40 public, public-private and community-based schools were reconstructed enabling over 5000 children to return to school. Following the IDP crisis in Pakistan of 2009 and the Pakistan floods of 2010, SRSP emerged as one of the largest implementing partners for United Nations High Commissioner for Refugees (UNHCR), reaching out to over 3.5 million Internally Displaced Persons (IDP's). SRSP has reached out to over 263,000 families with its flood response projects and programmes.

SRSP has remained one of the main partners of the government in the health sector and ran 570 basic health units (BHUs) throughout the province in 17 districts.

== Donors/Partners ==
SRSP has worked with a multitude of bilateral and multilateral donors, partners and international and national NGOs including:

1. Federal Government of Pakistan
2. Government of Khyber Pakhtunkhwa
3. European Union (EU)
4. United Nations Development Programme (UNDP)
5. United States Agency for International Development (USAID)
6. Canadian International Development Agency (CIDA)
7. Imran Khan Foundation (IKF)
8. Pakistan Army
9. Office of the United Nations High Commissioner for Refugees (UNHCR)
10. United Nations Educational, Scientific and Cultural Organization (UNESCO)
11. United Nations Population Fund (UNFPA)
12. Pakistan Poverty Alleviation Fund (PPAF)
13. Australian Agency for International Development (Australian Aid)
14. Department for International Development (DFID)
15. British Council
16. Foundation for Open Society Institute (OSF)
17. United Nations Children's Fund (UNICEF)
18. Deutsche Gesellschaft für Internationale Zusammenarbeit (GIZ)
19. PATRIP Foundation
20. Kreditanstalt fur Wiederaufbau (KfW)
21. Federal Republic of Germany
22. World Bank (WB)
23. Swiss Agency for Development and Cooperation (SDC)
24. World Food Programme (WFP)
25. Food and Agriculture Organization of the United Nations (FAO)
26. World Health Organization (WHO)
27. Citibank
28. International Rescue Committee (IRC)
29. International Union for Conservation of Nature (IUCN)
30. Save the Children
31. Alif Ailaan
32. International Federation of Red Cross and Red Crescent Societies (IFRC)
