= Turbat International Airport =

Airport in Balochistan, Pakistan

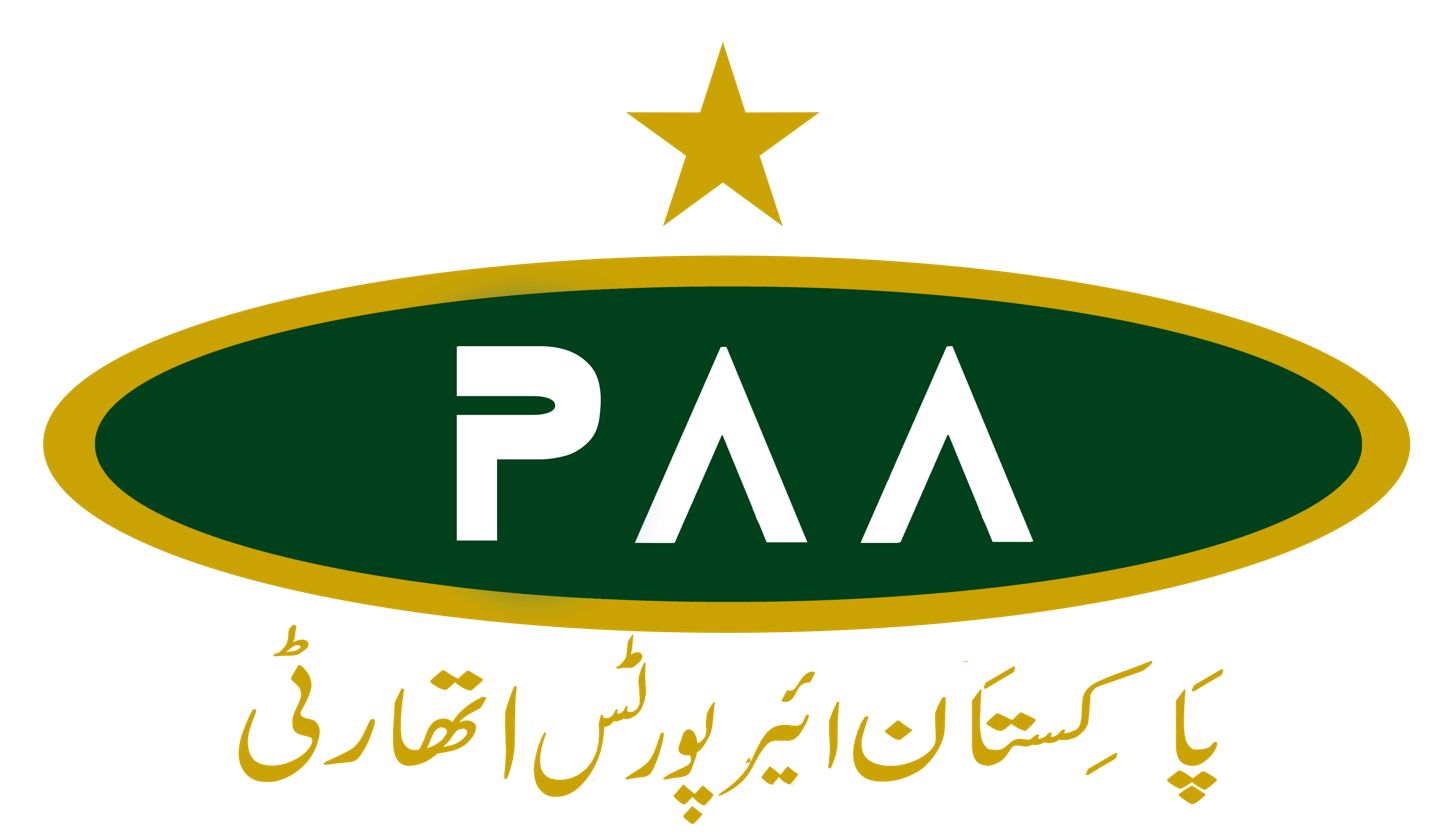
Turbat International Airport تربت بین الاقوامی ہوائی اڈا
- IATA: TUK; ICAO: OPTU

Summary
- Airport type: Joint-use airport
- Owner: GoP Aviation Division
- Operator: Pakistan Airports Authority
- Serves: Turbat
- Location: Chahser-92600, Kech District, Makran Division, Balochistan, Pakistan
- Built: 1970; 56 years ago
- Elevation AMSL: 501 ft (153 m)
- Coordinates: 25°59′10″N 63°01′48″E
- Website: paa.gov.pk
- Interactive map of Turbat International Airport

Runways
Direction	Length		Surface
Direction	ft	m	Surface
08L/26R	6,000	1,829	Bitumen
08R/26L	9,000	2,743	Bitumen

Statistics (2023-24)
- Passengers: 12,220
- Aircraft movements: 364
- Sources: PAA AIP

Turbat International Airport (IATA: TUK, ICAO: OPTU) (Balochi: تُربت میان اُستمانی بالی پٹ ) is located at Turbat, Balochistan, Pakistan. It has the largest land area within the province of Balochistan. It is the third largest airport in Balochistan, after Quetta International Airport and New Gwadar International Airport. The airport is located 5 km south of the city. The airport caters to the population of Turbat and the surrounding areas of Pidarak, Karkiabdar and Kalatak.

== History ==
Due to its geographical location, the airport has been not only catering to the regional traffic it receives from its local city, Turbat, but the surrounding towns and villages as well. The airport started out in the mid-1970s, when the Civil Aviation Authority of Pakistan constructed a runway and an apron to handle small turboprop aircraft. A year later, Pakistan International Airlines launched flights to the airport using Fokker F-27 Friendship aircraft. Due to lack of flights, PIA carried out their own handling at the airport and assumed responsibility for handling the airport operations. PIA offices were inaugurated and allowed the airline to carry out the tasks at the airport.

In 1979, the airport underwent a radical makeover that resulted in a re-carpeted runway as well as apron. A lounge for domestic arrival and departures was constructed in 1980. In 1983, a briefing area was constructed to allow family members of passengers seeing off their relatives, as well as an air traffic control building. The main road to the airport was re-developed and constructed to meet international standards by 1984. The Pakistan State Oil decided to provide aviation fuel to flights handled at the airport and built their own facility in 1994. The CAA of Pakistan decided to re-develop the airport in 2000, which housed the CAA administration office as well as a new ATC building. In 2003, a new arrivals lounge was constructed as well as a premium lounge for Commercially Important Persons (CIPs). A DVLS room was constructed in 2005. Customs and immigration facilities were upgraded in the same year. In 2008 a new office building for airlines and airport operational staff were inaugurated. The local government and the CAA have reported to be upgrading the airport to meet international standards in 2009 with new lounges, control tower and more apron space to handle more flights.

Pakistan International Airlines is the only airline operating from the airport, however Sharjah-based carrier Orbit Aviation has obtained clearance from the Pakistan Civil Aviation Authority to start twice weekly flights between Sharjah and Turbat via Gwadar. The company has yet to begin flights, although facilities and permissions are already in place for it to do so. airblue has also announced that it intends to start flying to Turbat in the future after it started regular flights to Gwadar. The national flag carrier also launched operations to the capital of Oman, Muscat in 2008 & Sharjah U.A.E

== Structure ==
Since the airport mainly caters to meet the need for local travellers and tourist passengers, it is regarded ideal to meet the number of flights and operations it has forecast for the future. However, with air travel on the rise, more is being invested at the airport to meet future needs. A new departure lounge was constructed and has been operational since 25 December 2012.

- Runway
  - 6,000 ft runway with dimensions 1829 m by 30 m
- Apron
  - For passenger and cargo, 91 m by 69 m area.
  - Combination of flexible and rigid pavements made of bitumen.
  - Nose-in parking for two narrow-bodied aircraft such as ATR/F-27 at a time.
- Lounge
  - One domestic and international lounge each.
  - Snack bar/tea shop available.
  - Newsagents/gift shop on premises.
  - Facility of restaurant of cooked meals (curry with roti, cold drink, sweet dish, and cup of tea) available 1.8 kilometres from terminal building. Transport is easily available
- Additional
  - No aircraft maintenance facility at the moment.
  - Fire Category at level CAT-4, Ambulance-01, Oshkosh(Striker)-01, Water Bowser-02.
  - A viewing verandah for enthusiasts, visitors, and various likely persons.
  - Facility for offering prayer available; separate for ladies and gents.
  - Habib Bank ATM located at a distance of 5 kilometres, linked to Visa and Mastercard, China UnionPay, and to the domestic 1LINK, MNET and PayPak switches. IBFT (Interbank Funds Transfer) facility is also provided at this ATM. This HBL ATM is attached to an HBL branch which also exchanges foreign currency, initiates SWIFT and FEDWIRE transfers, and facilitates RAAST real-time money transfer transactions.
  - Recently terminal building extended as passenger flow extended.

== Airlines and destinations ==
Airlines	Destinations
Pakistan International Airlines	Karachi
South Air	Quetta, Karachi

== Events ==
- PIA Flight 544 carrying 30 passengers on a Fokker F-27 originated at the airport bound for Gwadar. Mid-flight the aircraft was taken over by Baloch militants. The aircraft landed at Hyderabad Airport where commandos overtook the aircraft.

== See also ==
- List of airports in Pakistan
- Airlines of Pakistan
- Transport in Pakistan
