= Pakistani rupee =

Currency of the Islamic Republic of Pakistan

پاکستانی روپیہ (Urdu)
- Rs 20, Rs 100, Rs 500, Rs 1,000 banknotes

ISO 4217
- Code: PKR (numeric: 586)
- Subunit: 0.01

Units of account
- Base unit: Rupee
- Symbol: ₨ (This is an abbreviation. There is no formal currency symbol.)
- Subunit
- 1/100: Paisa (defunct); Paisa denominated coins ceased to be legal tender in 2013

Denominations
- Banknotes
- Freq. used: Rs 10, Rs 20, Rs 50, Rs 100, Rs 500, Rs 1,000, Rs 5,000
- Rarely used: Rs 75
- Coins
- Freq. used: Rs 1, Rs 2, Rs 5, Rs 10

Demographics
- Date of introduction: 1948; 78 years ago
- Replaced: Indian rupee
- User(s): Pakistan

Issuance
- Central bank: State Bank of Pakistan
- Website: www.sbp.org.pk
- Printer: Pakistan Security Printing Corporation
- Mint: Pakistan Mint

Valuation
- Inflation: 0.7% (March 2025)

The Pakistani rupee (Urdu: روپیہ; ISO code: PKR; symbol: 𞱱; abbreviation: Re (singular) and Rs (plural)) is the official currency of the Islamic Republic of Pakistan. It was formerly divided into one hundred paisa (Urdu: پیسہ); however, paisa-denominated coins have not been legal tender since 2013. The issuance of the currency is controlled by the State Bank of Pakistan. It was officially adopted by the Government of Pakistan in 1949. Earlier the coins and notes were issued and controlled by the Reserve Bank of India until 1949, when it was handed over to the Government and the State Bank of Pakistan, by the Government and the Reserve Bank of India.

In Pakistani English, large values of rupees are sometimes counted in thousands; lac (hundred thousands); crore (ten-millions); arab (billion); kharab (hundred billion). Nowadays the international grouping system is used in Pakistan.

== History ==
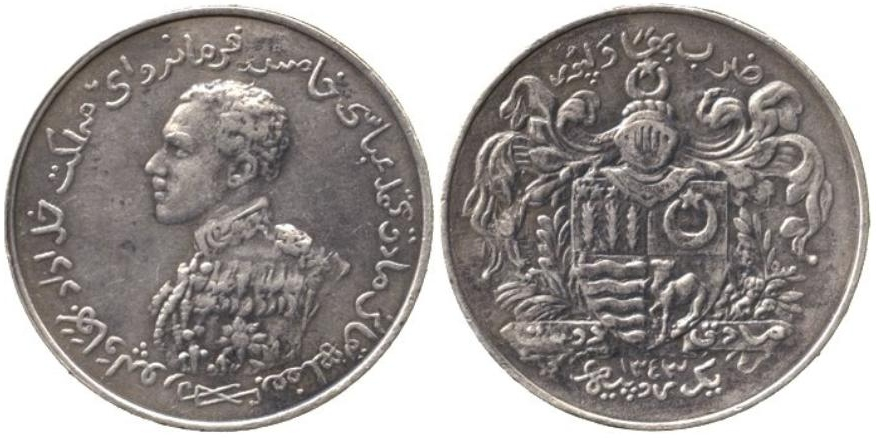
Rupee coin, struck in silver, used in the state of Bahawalpur before 1947.

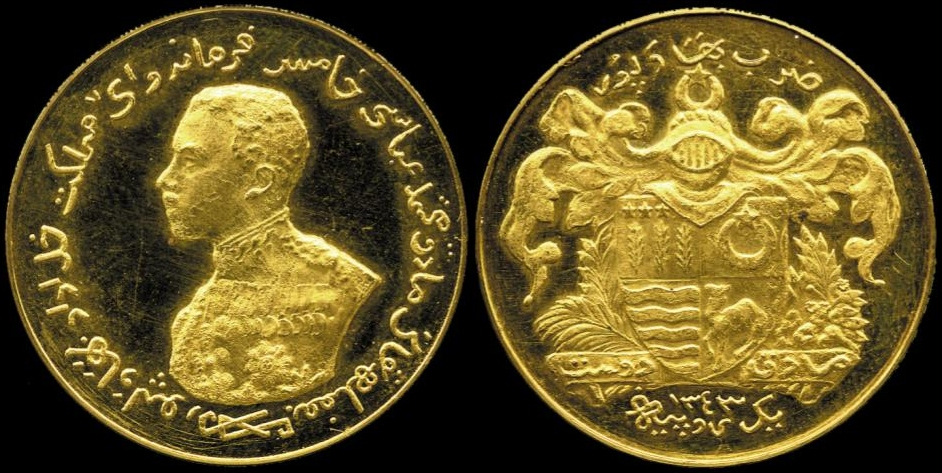
Rupee coin, struck in gold, used in the state of Bahawalpur before 1947.

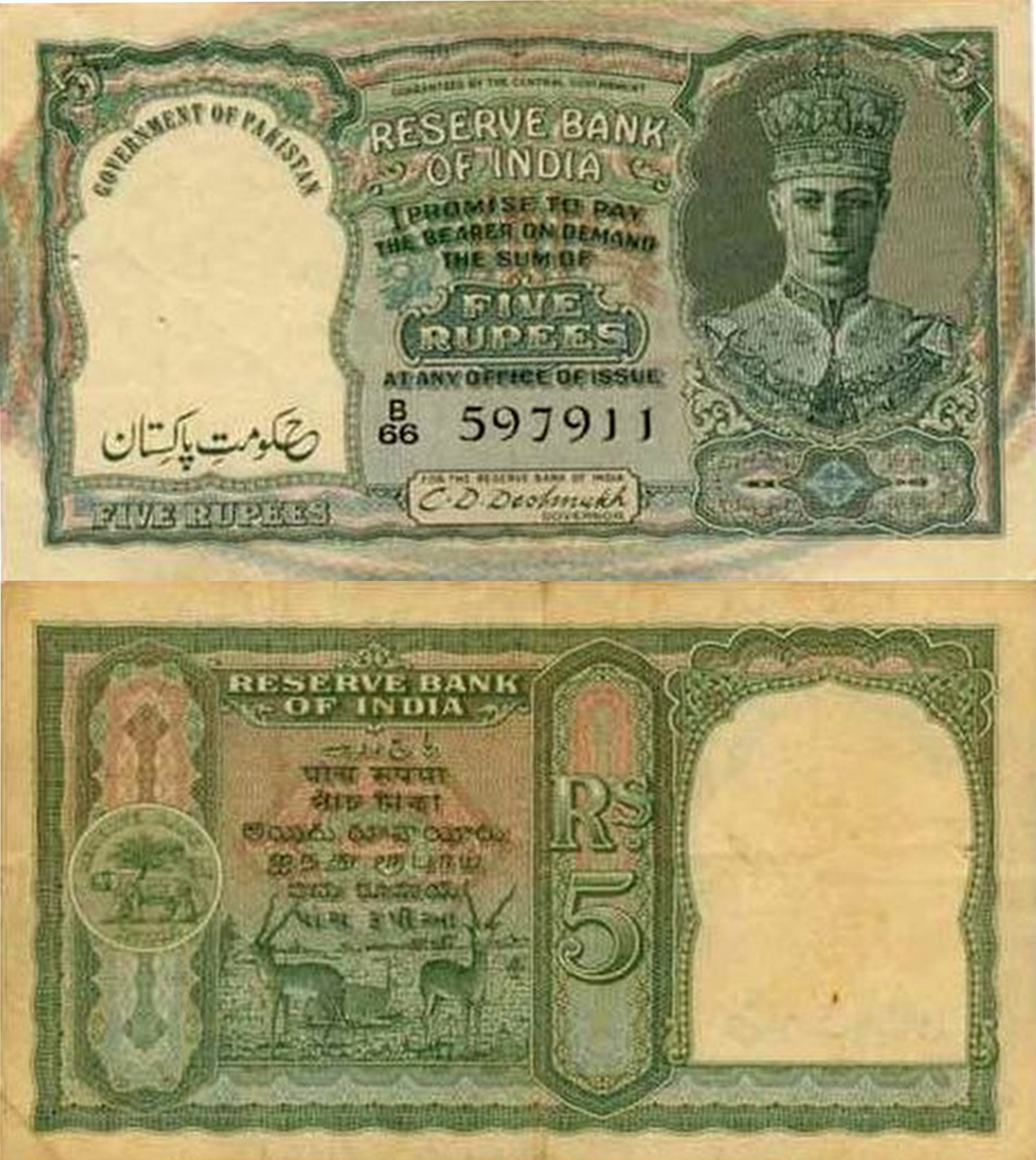
Indian rupees were stamped with Government of Pakistan to be used as legal tender in the new state of Pakistan in 1947.

The word rūpiya is derived from the Sanskrit word rūpya, which means "wrought silver, a coin of silver", in origin an adjective meaning "shapely", with a more specific meaning of "stamped, impressed", whence "coin". It is derived from the noun rūpa "shape, likeness, image". Rūpaya was used to denote the coin introduced by Sher Shah Suri during his reign from 1540 to 1545 CE.

The Pakistan (Monetary System and Reserve Bank) Order, 1947 was issued on 14 August 1947, by the Governor General of pre-partition British India, following the advice of an expert committee. It designated the Reserve Bank of India (RBI) as the temporary monetary authority for both India and Pakistan until 30 September 1948. During this transitional period, currency notes issued by the RBI and the Government of India were to remain legal tender in Pakistan. The order also allowed these notes to bear inscriptions of Government of Pakistan in Urdu and English, to be circulated from 1 April 1948. Like the Indian rupee, it was originally divided into 16 annas, each of 4 pice or 12 pie.

For the first seven months following partition, currency issued by the RBI and the Government of India continued to circulate in Pakistan. Modified RBI notes in denominations of 2, 5, 10, and 100 rupees, and 1-rupee notes from the Government of India were later introduced. The modifications involved inscribing Government of Pakistan in English and "Hakumat-e-Pakistan" in Urdu on the front of the notes.

An early 1948 agreement between the governments of India and Pakistan resulted in an amendment to the Pakistan (Monetary System and Reserve Bank) Order, 1947, moving up the deadline for the RBI's role as Pakistan's monetary authority from 30 September 1948, to 30 June 1948. Concurrently, the arrangement for the RBI to supply inscribed Indian notes to Pakistan was terminated on 30 June 1948.

In January 1961, the currency was decimalised, with the rupee subdivided into 100 pice, renamed (in English) paisa (singular paisa) later the same year. However, coins denominated in paisa have not been issued since 1996.

In 1972, the newly independent Bangladesh introduced the taka originally at parity with the Pakistani rupee. Afterwards, the Pakistani rupee ceased to be legal tender in Bangladesh.

== Coins ==
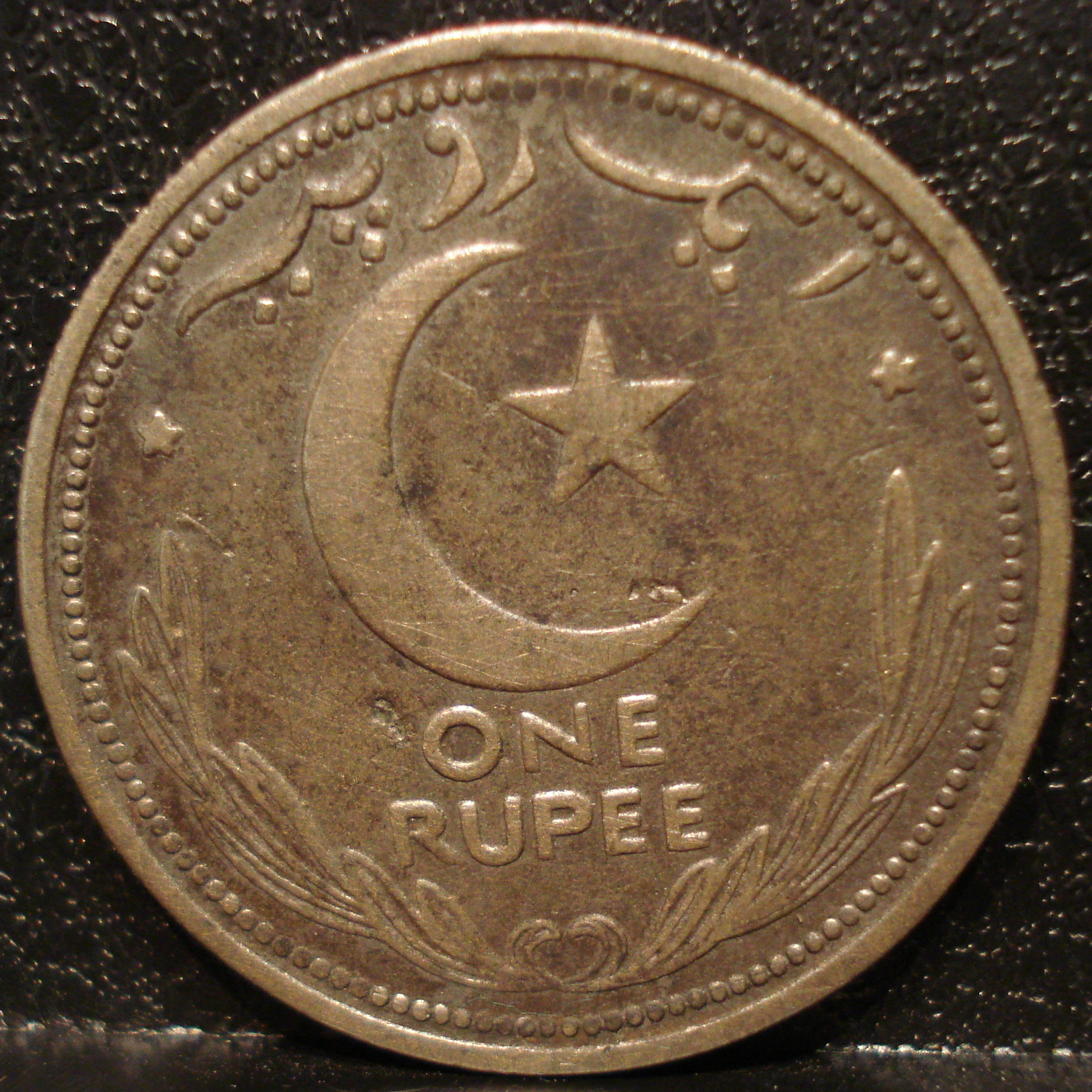
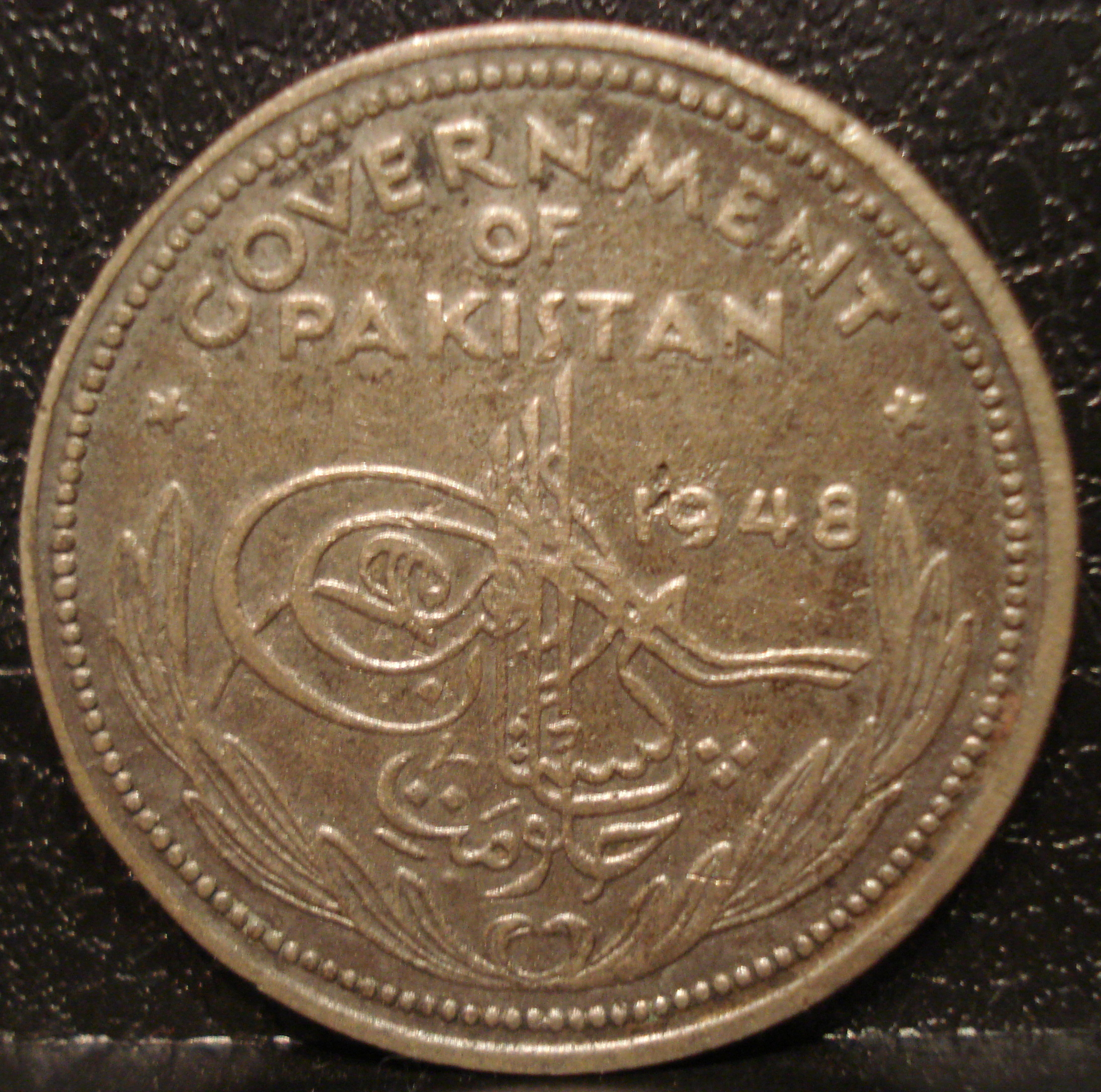
First Pakistani rupee coin, made of nickel, 1948.

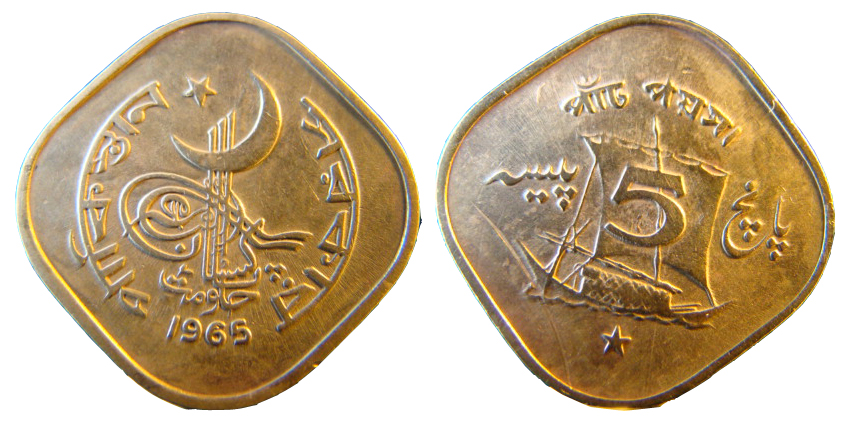
Five paisa coin first used in 1965

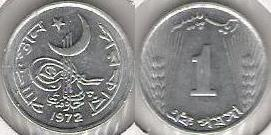
1 paisa coin first used in 1972

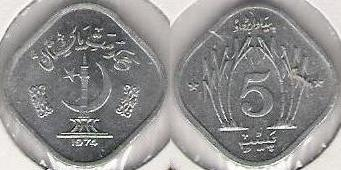
5 paisa coin used in 1974

In 1948, coins were introduced in denominations of 1 pice, 1/2, 1 and 2 annas, 1/4, 1/2 and 1 rupee. 1 pie coins were added in 1951. In 1961, coins for 1, 5 and 10 pice were issued, followed later the same year by 1 paisa, 5 and 10 paise coins. In 1963, 10 and 25 paise coins were introduced, followed by 2 paisa the next year. Re. 1/- coins were reintroduced in 1979, followed by Rs. 2/- in 1998 and Rs. 5/- in 2002. 2 paisa coins were last minted in 1976, with 1 paisa coins ceasing production in 1979. The 5, 10, 25 and 50 paise all ceased production in 1996. There are two variations of Rs. 2/- coins: most have clouds above the Badshahi Mosque but many don't. The Re. 1/- and Rs. 2/- coins were changed to Aluminium in 2007.

Paisa-denominated coins ceased to be legal tender in 2013, leaving the Re. 1/- coin as the minimum legal tender. On 15 October 2015, the Pakistan government introduced a revised Rs. 5/- coin with a reduced size and weight and having a golden colour, made from a composition of copper-nickel-zinc, and also in 2016 a Rs. 10/- coin was introduced into circulation.

In 2019, the Pakistani government introduced a commemorative Rs. 50/- coin to celebrate the 550th birthday of Guru Nanak and in tribute of opening of new Gurdwara of Kartarpur, Pakistan.

Currently circulating coins
Value	Years in use	Composition	Obverse illustration	Reverse illustration
Re. 1/-	1998 – present	Bronze (1998–2006); Aluminium (2007–present)	Quaid-e-Azam, Muhammad Ali Jinnah	Hazrat Lal Shahbaz Qalandar Mausoleum, Sehwan Shareef
Rs. 2/-	1998 – present	Brass (1998–1999); Nickel-brass (1999–2006); Aluminium (2007–)	Crescent and Star	Badshahi Masjid, Lahore
Rs. 5/-	2002 – present	Cupronickel (2002–2011); Copper-Zinc-Nickel (2015–present)	Crescent and Star	Number "5"
Rs. 10/-	2016 – present	Nickel-brass	Crescent and Star	Faisal Mosque, Islamabad
For table standards, see the coin specification table.

== Banknotes ==
On 1 April 1948, provisional notes were issued by the Reserve Bank of India and the Government of India on behalf of the Government of Pakistan, for use exclusively within Pakistan, without the possibility of redemption in India. Printed by the India Security Press in Nasik, these notes consist of Indian note plates engraved (not overprinted) with the words GOVERNMENT OF PAKISTAN in English and "Hukumat-e-PAKISTAN" in Urdu added at the top and bottom, respectively, of the watermark area on the front only; the signatures on these notes remain those of Indian banking and finance officials. Additionally, the United Kingdom's Thomas De La Rue and Company, along with Bradbury Wilkinson and Company, manufactured various denominations for Pakistan.

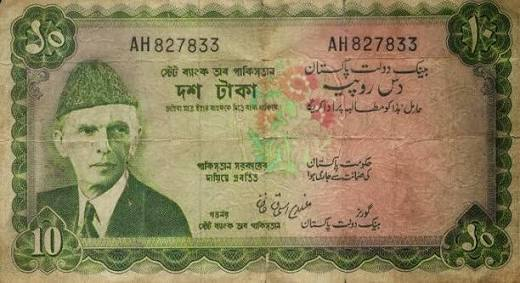
Old Pakistani rupee note, with Bengali written on it, as Bengali was a state language of Pakistan.

After independence, the Pakistani government established a national security printing facility in 1949, named the Pakistan Security Printing Corporation (PSPC). This venture, a partnership between Thomas De La Rue & Co. Ltd. (holding a 40% stake) and the Pakistani Government (with a 60% stake), started with a capital of 7.5 million rupees. The foundation for the facility was laid in Karachi by the Governor General of Pakistan on 11 March 1949. In selecting a printing method, the PSPC chose the intaglio process over the lithographic method due to concerns about counterfeiting and regional security issues with India. This decision reflected a preference for a higher-security printing technique.

Regular government issues commenced in 1948 in denominations of Re. 1/-, Rs. 5/-, Rs. 10/- and Rs. 100/-. The government continued to issue Re. 1 notes until the 1980s but another note-issuing was taken over by the State Bank of Pakistan in 1953 when Rs. 2/-, Rs. 5/-, Rs. 10/- and Rs. 100/- notes were issued. Only a few Rs. 2/- notes were issued. Rs. 50/- notes were added in 1957, with Rs. 2/- notes reintroduced in 1985. In 1986, Rs. 500/- notes were introduced, followed by Rs. 1,000/- the next year. Rs. 2/- and Rs. 5/- notes were replaced by coins in 1998 and 2002. Rs. 20/- notes were added in 2005, followed by Rs. 5,000/- in 2006. Until 1971, Pakistan banknotes were bilingual, featuring Bengali translation of the Urdu text (where the currency was renamed taka), since Bengali was the state language of East Pakistan (now Bangladesh).

The PSPC began issuing its own 1- and 5-rupee notes in the fiscal year 1952-53. These notes resembled those previously produced by Thomas de la Rue & Company, but the 1-rupee note featured a notable change: a blue back without under-print, different from the purple back of the British versions. This new design was circulated on 31 January 1953.

On 14 December 1963, the State Bank of Pakistan started operating its printing press, eventually taking over all national banknote production. Later, the 1-rupee note was modified to include a purple back with pink and blue under-print, similar to the De La Rue design. Variations of the 1-rupee note are identified by differences in the serial number font and signature styles.

Although the PSPC had been printing lower denomination notes since July 1953, the third series of the 100-rupee note, released in September 1953, was initially produced by Thomas De La Rue in the UK. Subsequently, these notes were printed by the PSPC, with the change in production source identifiable by variations in the serial number font.

=== Banknote features ===
All banknotes other than the Re. 1/- and Rs. 2/- feature a portrait of Muhammad Ali Jinnah on the obverse along with writing in Urdu. The reverses of the banknotes vary in design and have English text. The only Urdu text found on the reverse is the Urdu translation of the Prophetic Hadith, "Seeking an honest livelihood is an act of worship." which is حصول رزق حلال عبادت ہے (Hasool-e-Rizq-e-Halal Ibaadat hai).

The banknotes vary in size and colour, with larger denominations being longer than smaller ones. All contain multiple colours. However, each denomination does have one colour which predominates. All banknotes feature a watermark for security purposes. On the larger denomination notes, the watermark is a picture of Jinnah, while on smaller notes, it is a crescent and star. Different types of security threads are also present in each banknote.

=== List of banknotes ===
Banknotes before the 2005 series
Value	Dimensions	Main color	Description – Reverse	Status
Rs. 1/-	95 × 66 mm	Brown	Tomb of Muhammad Iqbal in Lahore	No longer in circulation
Rs. 2/-	109 × 66 mm	Purple	Badshahi Masjid in Lahore	No longer in circulation
Rs. 5/-	127 × 73 mm	Burgundy	Khojak Tunnel in Balochistan	No longer in circulation
Rs. 10/-	141 × 73 mm	Green	Mohenjo-daro in Larkana District	No longer in circulation
Rs. 50/-	154 × 73 mm	Purple and red	Alamgiri Gate of the Lahore Fort in Lahore	No longer in circulation
Rs. 100/-	165 × 73 mm	Red and orange	Islamia College in Peshawar	No longer in circulation
Rs. 500/-	175 × 73 mm	Green, tan, red, and orange	The State Bank of Pakistan in Islamabad	No longer in circulation
Rs. 1,000/-	175 × 73 mm	Blue	Tomb of Jahangir in Lahore	No longer in circulation

The State Bank has started a new series of banknotes, phasing out the older designs for new, more secure ones.

2005 series
Value	Dimensions	Main colour	Description			Date of			Ref.
Value	Dimensions	Main colour	Obverse	Reverse	Watermark	issue	withdrawal	lapse	Ref.
Rs. 5/-	115 × 65 mm	Greenish grey	Muhammad Ali Jinnah	Gwadar Port	Muhammad Ali Jinnah and "5"	8 July 2008	31 December 2011	31 December 2012	
Rs. 10/-	115 × 65 mm	Green	Muhammad Ali Jinnah	Bab-e-Khyber (entrance to the Khyber Pass)	Muhammad Ali Jinnah and "10"	27 May 2006	Current		
Rs. 20/-	123 × 65 mm	Burgundy	Muhammad Ali Jinnah	Mohenjo-daro	Muhammad Ali Jinnah and "20"	13 August 2005	Current		
Rs. 20/-	123 × 65 mm	Orange	Muhammad Ali Jinnah	Mohenjo-daro	Muhammad Ali Jinnah and "20"	22 March 2008	Current		
Rs. 50/-	131 × 65 mm	Purple	Muhammad Ali Jinnah	K2	Muhammad Ali Jinnah and "50"	8 July 2008	Current		
Rs. 100/-	139 × 65 mm	Red	Muhammad Ali Jinnah	Quaid-e-Azam Residency	Muhammad Ali Jinnah and "100"	11 November 2006	Current		
Rs. 500/-	147 × 65 mm	Deep Green	Muhammad Ali Jinnah	Badshahi Mosque	Muhammad Ali Jinnah and "500"	11 November 2006	Current		
Rs. 1,000/-	155 × 65 mm	Blue	Muhammad Ali Jinnah	Islamia College in Peshawar	Muhammad Ali Jinnah and "1000"	26 February 2007	Current		
Rs. 5,000/-	163 × 65 mm	Brown	Muhammad Ali Jinnah	Faisal Mosque	Muhammad Ali Jinnah and "5000"	27 May 2006	Current		
For table standards, see the banknote specification table.

=== Haj Pilgrim Banknotes ===
Pakistan put foreign exchange controls in place in 1949, restricting the export and import of currency except for when needed for the Haj in Saudi Arabia. This created an opportunity for smuggling, leading Pakistan to issue special Haj pilgrim notes for use by pilgrims. These were differentiated by an overprint in English "For pilgrims from Pakistan for use in Saudi Arabia and Iraq".

Although other means of exchange were considered, the high level of illiteracy amongst the Pakistani pilgrims and the additional costs that would be incurred through the need to purchase such means prevented the government from these methods of exchange. The State Bank Order to allow the issue of these Haj notes was made in May 1950.

A new series of notes was released in 1972, under the name of the State Bank of Pakistan rather than the Government of Pakistan. These had an Urdu overprint as well as an English one, saying "For Hajj [sic] pilgrims from Pakistan for use in Saudi Arabia only". New notes were printed in 1975 and 1978, reflecting changes in the standard notes. The use of Haj notes continued until 1978.

Until this date, stocks of notes were used without the necessity of printing new notes with the signatures of the later Governors. It is believed that once the use of Haj pilgrim notes were discontinued, most of the remaining stock of notes was destroyed. However, many notes entered the collector market following their sale to a banknote dealer by the State Bank of Pakistan.

=== Pakistan's 75th Independence Commemorative Bank Note ===
On 14 August 2022, State Bank of Pakistan released the design of the commemorative 75 Rupees note marking the 75th anniversary of Independence day of Pakistan. The note was signed by the former governor of State Bank of Pakistan Raza Baqir and was made available to the public from September 30, 2022.

=== State Bank's 75th Anniversary Banknote ===
On July 4, 2023, State Bank of Pakistan (SBP) Governor Jameel Ahmad introduced a commemorative Rs. 75 banknote to celebrate the central bank's 75th anniversary.

==== Security Features ====
The Rs75 commemorative note is equipped with security features as with the other currency notes. These include the Urdu numeral '75' which appears complete when the note is held in the light, Pure Image security thread with pulsing holographic rainbow effect and micro-lettering of 'SBP' and '75', among others.

Moreover, the portraits and numbers on the note have raised printing, allowing identification of the banknote by the visually impaired.

==== Controversies Regarding Legal Status ====
During Eid al-Fitr, shopkeepers across Pakistan refused to accept Rs. 75 notes, sparking rumours about the note’s possible demonetization.

In response, SBP spokesperson Abid Qamar posted a video on the central bank’s official Twitter account, reassuring the public that the Rs. 75 commemorative note is fully valid for transactions. He explained that the SBP issues all currency under Section 25 of its Act, and the Rs. 75 note has no expiration date.

Qamar also dismissed rumors that the government had withdrawn or discontinued the banknote.

The commemorative note issued in 2022 for Pakistan’s 75th independence anniversary featured Quaid-e-Azam, Fatima Jinnah, Allama Iqbal, and Sir Syed Ahmad Khan. This selection stirred some debate, as certain individuals felt the omission of figures like Pakistan’s first Prime Minister, Liaquat Ali Khan, was significant.

==== Supply ====
He explained that the commemorative Rs. 75 banknote, a legal tender, will not impact the overall money supply. Of the 4.3 billion notes being circulated this year, only 65 million will be the Rs. 75 denomination, making it a limited, one-time release.

Haj banknotes
Image		Value	Main colour	Description – Reverse	Date of usage
Obverse	Reverse	Value	Main colour	Description – Reverse	Date of usage
		Rs. 10/-	Dark purple	Shalimar Gardens in Lahore	1960–1969
		Rs. 10/-	Dark blue	Mohenjo-daro in Larkana	1970–1976
		Rs. 100/-	Dark orange	Islamia College (Peshawar)	1970–1976
For table standards, see the banknote specification table.

Special banknotes for the 50th and 75th anniversary of the Independence of Pakistan
Image		Value	Main colour	Description – Front	Description – Reverse	Date of usage
Obverse	Reverse	Value	Main colour	Description – Front	Description – Reverse	Date of usage
		Rs. 5/-	Dark purple	Quaid-e-Azam Muhammad Ali Jinnah	Baha-ud-din Zakariya Tomb Multan	1997
For table standards, see the banknote specification table.

Commemorative issues
Value	Dimensions	Main colour	Description			Date of issue	Ref.
Value	Dimensions	Main colour	Obverse	Reverse	Watermark	Date of issue	Ref.
Rs. 75/-	147 × 65 mm	Green	Muhammad Ali Jinnah, Muhammad Iqbal, Fatima Jinnah, Syed Ahmad Khan	Markhor, Deodar tree	Muhammad Ali Jinnah and "75"	30 September 2022	
Rs. 75/-	139 × 65 mm	Blue	Muhammad Ali Jinnah, Building of the State Bank of Pakistan	Fatima Jinnah	Muhammad Ali Jinnah and "75"	July 2023	
For table standards, see the banknote specification table.

== Exchange rate ==
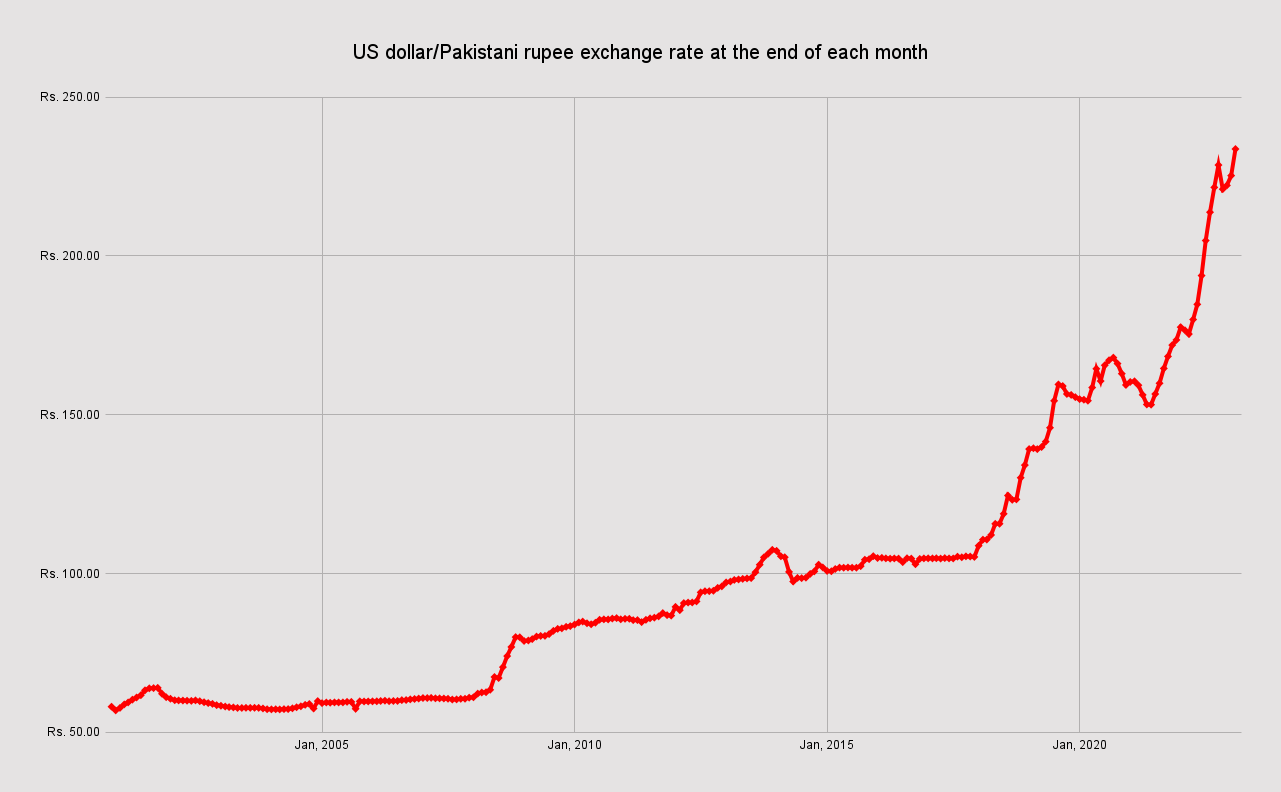
US dollar-Pakistani rupee exchange rate

Between 1948 and July 1955, the Pakistani rupee was effectively pegged to the U.S. dollar at approximately Rs.3/31 per U.S. dollar. Afterwards, this was changed to approximately Rs.4/76 per U.S. dollar, a devaluation of 30%, to match the Indian rupee's value. This fixed exchange rate was maintained until 11 May 1972, in which the rupee was devalued to Rs.11/- per dollar.

Initially, the Indian and Pakistani rupees were at parity until sterling was devalued in 1949, in which India followed suit but Pakistan did not. This caused the Pakistani rupee to be valued at a 44% premium to the Indian rupee until the Pakistani rupee was devalued in 1955, returning to parity with the Indian rupee. This parity lasted until India devalued their currency in 1966.

Since the United States dollar suspension in 1971 of convertibility of paper currency into any precious metal, the Pakistani rupee has been fiat money. Before the collapse of the Bretton Woods system, the currency was pegged at a fixed exchange rate to the United States dollar for international trade, with the dollar convertible to gold for foreign governments only.

The rupee was pegged to the Pound Sterling until 1982 when the government of General Zia-ul-Haq changed to a managed float. As a result, the rupee devalued by 38.5% between 1982–83 and 1987–88 and the cost of importing raw materials increased rapidly, causing pressure on Pakistani finances and damaging much of the industrial base. The Pakistani rupee depreciated against the United States dollar until the turn of the century when Pakistan's large current account surplus pushed the value of the rupee up against the dollar. The State Bank of Pakistan then stabilized the exchange rate by lowering interest rates and buying dollars, to preserve the country's export competitiveness.

2008 was termed a disastrous year for the rupee after the elections: between December 2007 and August 2008, it lost 23% of its value, falling to a record low of Rs.79/20 against the US dollar, due to fears that President Pervez Musharraf would be impeached for his role in the 1999 Pakistani coup d'état.

The Pakistani rupee gained value from the end of September until mid-October 2023, when Pakistan's Federal Investigation Agency embarked on a country-wide raid on exchange companies involved in illegal dollar transactions, which involved the buying and selling of dollars through informal channels without documentation. Since then, the Pakistani rupee became the best-performing currency of September 2023 against the US dollar.

Current PKR exchange rates
From Google Finance:	AUD CAD CHF CNY EUR GBP HKD JPY USD
From Yahoo! Finance:	AUD CAD CHF CNY EUR GBP HKD JPY USD
From XE.com:	AUD CAD CHF CNY EUR GBP HKD JPY USD
From OANDA:	AUD CAD CHF CNY EUR GBP HKD JPY USD

== See also ==
- Currency
- Rupee
- History of the rupee
- Economy of Pakistan
- List of countries by leading trade partners
