= Commemorative banknotes of Pakistan =

Commemorative currency denomination

Commemorative banknotes of Pakistani Rupee are issued by the State Bank of Pakistan. The green coloured 75-rupee banknote was issued on 17th August 2022 on the 75th Independence Anniversary of Pakistan. Another blue coloured note was released nearly a year later in July to commemorate the 75th Anniversary of State Bank of Pakistan.

== Pakistan's 75th independence commemoration note ==
The image is the obverse of 75 rupee independence commemoration notes featuring (left to right) Syed Ahmad Khan, Fatima Jinnah, Muhammad Ali Jinnah and Muhammad Iqbal. This is a late note signed by SBP governor Jameel Ahmed instead of former governor Reza Baqir.

The 75-rupee Independence commemorative banknote was introduced by the State Bank of Pakistan on August 14, 2022, to commemorate 75 years of Pakistan's independence. This release marked the second commemorative banknote issued by the State Bank of Pakistan, following the golden jubilee banknote issued in 1997 to celebrate 50 years of independence.

=== Design ===
==== Obverse ====
The note features a green and white design with tones of yellow and prominently displays portraits of Pakistan’s key historical figures: Muhammad Ali Jinnah, Fatima Jinnah, Allama Muhammad Iqbal, and Syed Ahmad Khan on the front or obverse. These images symbolize the "determination" and "sacrifices" of these "iconic" personalities in the struggle for Pakistan’s independence.

==== Reverse ====
On the back, there's a scene with Deodar (Cedrus Deodara) trees and the national animal, the Markhor. This design which is created by illustrator Sara Khan.

==== Security features ====
The Rs 75 commemorative note is equipped with similar security features as with the other currency notes. These include the Urdu numeral '75' which appears complete when the note is held in the light, Pure Image security thread with pulsing holographic rainbow effect and micro-lettering of 'SBP' and '75', among others. Moreover, the portraits and numbers on the note have raised printing, allowing identification of the banknote by the visually impaired.

== State Bank of Pakistan anniversary commemorative note ==
The State Bank of Pakistan's 75th anniversary note featuring Muhammad Ali Jinnah on the front along with a stylized sketch of state bank building signed by SBP governor Jameel Ahmed.

On July 4, 2023, State Bank of Pakistan Governor Jameel Ahmed introduced another commemorative Rs.75 banknote to celebrate the central bank's 75th anniversary.

=== Design ===
==== Obverse ====
The predominantly blue banknote, chosen to convey the stability of a central bank, features a stylized sketch of the state bank building by Syed Sadequain Ahmed Naqvi. This sketch appears alongside the traditional portrait of Quaid-e-Azam on the front.

==== Reverse ====
The back of the banknote reflects the state bank's commitment to "banking on equality," featuring a portrait of Fatima Jinnah. It also underscores Pakistan's dedication to combating climate change, showcasing sustainable energy sources like wind turbines and solar panels.

== See also ==
- Commemorative coins of Pakistan
