= Akram Khatoon =

Pakistani banker

- Born: 26 September 1937 (age 89); Ajmer
- Education: master in Economics from University of the Punjab (1958)
- Occupation: banking
- Title: President of First Women Bank Limited

Akram Khatoon (born 26 September 1937, in Ajmer) is a Pakistani retired banker who served the first president of First Women Bank Limited a position which she held from 1989 to 2004.

== Early life and education ==
Khatoon was born in Ajmer, British India, on 26 September 1937 to Muhammad Shafi and Hasina Begum. Shafi worked in the Pakistan Railways. Khatoon had two younger sisters. She attended a missionary school in Ajmer, India. Her parents migrated to Pakistan in 1947, when she was in grade 4. When her family settled in Lahore after the Partition, Khatoon was enrolled in Islamia Girls High School in the Lahore Cantonment area. She did her graduation from Lahore College for Women University and did a master in Economics from University of the Punjab through Forman Christian College Lahore in 1958. Khatoon had an excellent academic record. She took part in sports such as netball, volleyball, high jump, cycling and other activities such as debates, speech and writing competitions. A short autobiography of hers was published in the midweek magazine, Daily Jang of Karachi. Although her friends insisted, Khatoon decided against writing a book on her because she believes that readership for books is dwindling. Her sisters are married and live in London. She chose not to marry in order to care for her parents.

== Career ==
Khatoon's first job was lecturing in Sukkur, Sindh. She joined banking as a training officer for State Bank of Pakistan's officer training scheme. She was one of the fifty successful candidates from West Pakistan out of a total of 1600 candidates. She has a Banking Diploma from Diploma Associate Institute of Bankers Pakistan (DAIBP). She has been serving the banking sector for the last 41 years. Prior to her appointment as CEO of First Woman Bank, she served Muslim Commercial Bank for 28 years in different senior management positions. She has the privilege of initiating women banking on a global scale by heading Muslim Commercial Banks’ first all women branch in the earlier days of her career. Her last assignment at Muslim Commercial Bank was chief of the recruitment and training division at head office. She has been a council member for the Institute of Bankers in Pakistan and also member of the board of governors for NIPA Karachi. She remained in the executive committee of Pakistan Banks' Association till her retirement. Before being appointed as the President for First Women Bank, she was interviewed by the interior minister of the time Major-General Naseerullah Khan Babar.

=== Other notable career highlights ===
- President, Pakistan Federation of University Women
- Member on Marketing and Fund raising Committee of International Federation of University for Women, Switzerland
- Senior Advisor of Pakistan Federation of Business and Professional Women
- Vice President, Senior Citizen's Council Sindh
- Member of the Board of Governors of Jinnah Women University Karachi
- Has been on the Board of Directors of First Micro Finance Bank Ltd. Islamabad
- Office bearer and Trustee of various NGOs and Trusts.

== Contributions towards women empowerment ==
Khatoon was the founding president of the First Women Bank, she remained president from 26 November 1989 till 28 May 2001, a total of eleven and half years. Under her leadership, First Women Bank became a pioneer in introducing microfinancing in Pakistan to cater to the credit needs of under privileged business women, both in urban and rural sector. Another innovative step taken by her was to arrange training programs for women entrepreneurs for development of their business, behavioral and marketing skills under the aegis of First Women Bank. During her tenure, First Women Bank had set up business centers in all the big cities, housing and marketing outlets, and business development skills centers for businesswomen. For these innovative strategies introduced for economic empowerment of women, the bank was conferred ‘EURO – Money Award 1994', for being the ‘Best Bank’ in Pakistan. Through her bank, she disbursed 100,000 million rupees in loans to women and taught them business skills which would enable them to repay these loans. Surveys conducted after these strategies showed that there was a marked improvement in the health and well being of women as well as their children, they were now more involved in decision making.

== Contributions towards women's education ==
Khatoon served as the Chancellor of Jinnah University for Women from 2017 to 2019. She currently holds a lifelong seat on the university's Board of Governors. During her tenure in university leadership, she focused on initiatives aimed at academic quality and institutional development.

== Awards and recognition ==
- SIUT and APWA acknowledged her services for the country by opening their first satellite dialysis center by her name, APWA Akram Khatoon Dialysis Center
- Wonder Woman Pakistan 2017
