= Monetary Policy Committee =

Monetary Policy Committee (MPC) may refer to:

- Monetary Policy Committee (Brazil), of the Central Bank of Brazil
- Monetary Policy Committee (India), of the Reserve Bank of India
- Monetary Policy Committee (Pakistan), of the State Bank of Pakistan
- Monetary Policy Committee (United Kingdom), of the Bank of England
