= Murtaza Syed =

Pakistani economist

- Occupations: Economist, policymaker
- Employer: State Bank of Pakistan
- Title: Acting Governor
- Predecessor: Reza Baqir
- Successor: Jameel Ahmad

Murtaza Syed is a Pakistani economist and policymaker who served as the acting governor of the State Bank of Pakistan in 2022.

== Biography ==
Syed is a graduate of the Oxford University. During his career, he worked with the International Monetary Fund (IMF) for sixteen years, serving in various capacities at the IMF, working on issues related to emerging markets and advanced economies and held positions in China and Macao. Prior to the IMF, Syed worked as a Senior Policy Analyst at the Islamabad-based Human Development Center and conducted research at London's Institute for Fiscal Studies (IFS).

In 2020, Murtaza Syed began a three-year term as Deputy Governor of the State Bank of Pakistan, appointed by the Federal Government under the State Bank of Pakistan Act 1956 (amended).

Syed has published multiple papers on macroeconomic issues and has lectured at Cambridge and Oxford Universities.
