= IBP =

IBP may refer to:

== Science and technology ==
- Iso-butyl-propanoic-phenolic acid, marketed as Ibuprofen
- Indian buffet process, a statistical process
- Integration by parts, a technique used in integral calculus
- Invasive blood pressure
- International Biological Program, a large-scale research effort in ecosystem ecology in the 1960s and 1970s

== Organizations ==
- IBP, Inc. (Iowa Beef Processors), a defunct beef-producing company now owned by Tyson Foods
- The Institute for Bird Populations
- Institute of Bankers Pakistan, a banking training institute
- Institute of the Good Shepherd (Institut du Bon Pasteur), a traditional Catholic priest society
- Integrated Bar of the Philippines, a professional organization of lawyers
- Interim Batasang Pambansa, the unicameral legislature of the Philippines from 1978 to 1984
- Israel Border Police

== Other uses ==
- Iloilo Business Park, a central business district in Iloilo City, Philippines
- Integrated business planning
- Integrative body psychotherapy, a form of body psychotherapy
- International Business Park, a business park in Jurong East, Singapore
