= ICSP =

ICSP may refer to:

- In-circuit serial programming (ICSP), a method for programming microcontrollers
- Indian Centre for Space Physics, a research institute in India
- Institute of Corporate Secretaries of Pakistan, a professional body in Pakistan
- International Committee on Systematics of Prokaryotes
- International Council on Shared Parenting
