= PayPak =

Pakistani card payment service

- Product type: Debit Card; Contactless smart card
- Current owner: 1Link
- Country: Pakistan
- Introduced: 5 April 2016; 10 years ago
- Markets: Pakistan
- Website: paypak.net.pk

PayPak (Urdu: پے پاک) is a domestic payment service available in Pakistan.

It was launched in 2016 by 1Link to save inter-change costs of International Payment Schemes. PayPak cards can only be used on ATMs, POS terminals, and e-commerce portals within Pakistan.

The new payment scheme aims to compete in the domestic market with other, established, international payment schemes such as Visa, Mastercard, and UnionPay.

== Technology and license ==
PayPak uses Gemalto's product PURE. PURE is an off-the-shelf payment application from Gemalto that is fully compliant with the EMV standard. It is designed for banks and private payment card associations seeking chip-based security and a fast time to market. Additionally, PURE is a scheme-agnostic EMV application that private-label card issuers and national payment associations can utilise without the need to enter into a business agreement with another payment scheme.

== Market share ==
The uptake of the payment scheme was initially slow, with State Bank of Pakistan intervening to encourage adoption. By February 2021, more than 4 million PayPak cards had been issued – representing about 9% of the overall 44.5 million payment cards issued in the country. By January 2024, this number rose to 11 million cardholders, giving PayPak a market share of 25% in the country's debit card segment and 19% among the overall 57 million payment cards issued. By December 2025, PayPak accounted for more than 25% of the 53 million debit cards issued in Pakistan, but represented only 6% of total card usage.

== See also ==
- Rupay
- Google Pay (payment method)
- Raast
