= Hyderabad Airport (disambiguation) =

Hyderabad Airport may refer to:

In India

- Begumpet Airport, an airport for general and military aviation in Hyderabad, Telangana
- Rajiv Gandhi International Airport, the commercial airport serving Hyderabad, Telangana

In Pakistan

- Hyderabad Airport (Pakistan), the airport serving Hyderabad, Sindh
