= Pakistan International Airlines Flight 544 =

1998 aircraft hijacking in Pakistan

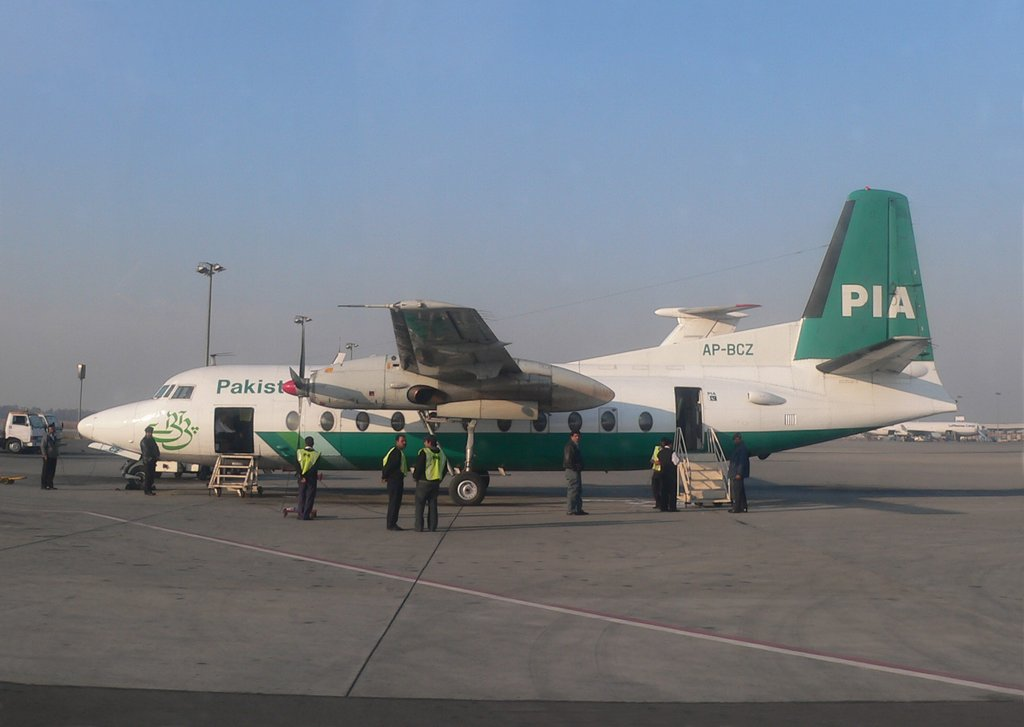
- AP-BCZ, the aircraft involved in the hijacking

Hijacking
- Date: 25 May 1998
- Summary: Hijacking
- Site: Gwadar, Balochistan

Aircraft
- Aircraft type: Fokker F-27
- Operator: Pakistan International Airlines
- IATA flight No.: PK544
- ICAO flight No.: PIA544
- Call sign: PAKISTAN 544
- Registration: AP-BCZ
- Flight origin: Gwadar International Airport
- Last stopover: Turbat Airport
- Destination: Hyderabad Airport
- Passengers: 33
- Crew: 5
- Fatalities: 0
- Injuries: 0
- Survivors: 38

Pakistan International Airlines Flight 544 was a Pakistan International Airlines Fokker F27 which was hijacked on 25 May 1998, shortly after it took off from Gwadar International Airport, by three armed men belonging to Baloch Students Organization. The aircraft, with 33 passengers and 5 crew members aboard, had just arrived from Gwadar International Airport, Balochistan, and was set to land at Hyderabad Airport, Sindh. The hijackers demanded that the aircraft be flown to New Delhi, India. The Army's Special Service Group's Haideri Company, 7th Commando Zarrar Battalion, SSG Division, accompanied by members of the Pakistan Rangers, stormed the aircraft, while the Pakistan Police surrounded the plane. The operation concluded with all three hijackers arrested. There were no casualties among the passengers and the crew. The hijackers were tried in court and sentenced to death. All 3 hijackers were hanged.

== Hijacking of the aircraft ==
The incident began while the aircraft was flying, carrying 33 passengers with 5 crew members abroad. The Karachi-bound PIA Fokker Aircraft, Flight PK-554, was hijacked shortly after it took off from Gwadar at 5:35pm on 25 May 1998. The hijackers forced the pilot to fly towards New Delhi, India.

== Hijacker's demands ==
The hijackers had initially asked the pilot to veer the plane towards New Delhi. But, the pilot refused to head towards Delhi on the pretext of fuel shortage and Pakistan Air Force jets had intercepted the aircraft as well. The drama started when the PIA pilot, Captain Uzair Khan, called the Hyderabad Airport general manager after being hijacked. His message addressed Hyderabad Airport as Bhuj Airport, and led the hijackers to believe that they were in Bhuj, India, as he had heard the hijackers talking about maps of Bhuj. The Hyderabad airport staff started pretending to be from Bhuj airport and told the pilot that they were waiting for the plane to land. This communication assured the hijackers that the plane had crossed into India.

== Hijackers ==
The three hijackers were identified as Shahsawar Baloch, Sabir Baloch and Shabir Rind. They were traveling under the names of Jamal Hussain, Anwer Hussain and Ghulam Hussain.

== Timeline ==
=== The siege of Flight 544 ===
The plane landed at Hyderabad late at night. The airport manager had switched off the lights and markings of Hyderabad. Later in the night, the hijackers released flight engineer Sajjad Chaudhry to talk to the authorities to refuel the plane for an onward journey to New Delhi, India. The standoff came to an end after seven hours of continuous negotiations led by senior officials of the Pakistan Police. The officials included Senior Superintendent of Police Akhtar Gorchani, Assistant Superintendent of Police Usman Anwar, Deputy Commissioner & District Magistrate Hyderabad Sohail Akbar Shah and Pakistan Rangers Major Aamir Hashmi, at 3 am on Monday. The hijackers demanded food, water, and fuel for the aircraft.

=== Preparation for the attack ===
The officials that included Senior Superintendent of Police (SSP) Hyderabad Akhtar Gorchani, Assistant Superintendent of Police (ASP) Hyderabad Dr. Usman Anwar, Deputy Commissioner (DC) Sohail Shah and Army ISI Rangers Major Aamir Hashmi, at 3 am on Monday . The hijackers' demand for food and water and fuel for the aircraft.

There were three hijackers and officials mentioned above were able to take control of the situation after women and children were released from the plane. After DC Sohail Shah reached out to control and informed them situation is under control, police and rangers vehicles approached the plane and all the hijackers were arrested.

This mission was completed by Senior Superintendent of Police (SSP) Hyderabad Akhtar Gorchani, Assistant Superintendent of Police (ASP) Hyderabad Dr. Usman Anwar, Deputy Commissioner (DC) Sohail Shah and Army Rangers ISI Major Aamir Hashmi. All the other military and para military agencies were in the vicinity but they were not allowed to come close the plane because hijackers were under the assumption they were at an Indian airport.

== Investigation ==
The hijackers were said to be carrying small weapons - pistols, although they showed some packets which they claimed were high intensity explosives. The interrogations revealed that the Baloch hijackers were opposed to the country's nuclear weapons tests in Balochistan province in response to recent Indian nuclear testing. It was later revealed that hijackers had demanded refueling to proceed to New Delhi. During the siege, the Corps Commander of V Corps, Chief Secretary, Home Secretary, and IG police were at the airport.

== Aftermath ==
Sindh Governor Moinuddin Haider remained in touch with the authorities throughout the siege. The following week, he honored the Sindh Police officers with the highest honors and gallantry awards. The hijackers were tried and convicted under Section 402-B of the Pakistan Penal Code (hijacking) in 1998 and were given the death penalty in 1999. All hijackers were hanged on 28 May 2015, after 17 years to the day when Pakistan had successfully conducted their nuclear tests in Chagai, Balochistan.
