= National Institute of Banking & Finance =

Training institute of the State Bank of Pakistan

National Institute of Banking and Finance Pakistan
- NIBAF P
- Former names: NIBAF and Institute of Pakistan
- Type: Banking institution
- Established: 8 March 1993
- Affiliations: State Bank of Pakistan
- Chairman: Governor of State Bank of Pakistan
- Location: Islamabad, Pakistan
- Campus: Islamabad Lahore and Karachi
- Website: nibaf.sbp.org.pk

The National Institute of Banking and Finance, Pakistan (NIBAF P) is a subsidiary of the State Bank of Pakistan (SBP) headed by the managing director, a board of directors and the SBP governor. NIBAF P, a non-profit organisation, aims at providing training and development to central and commercial bankers at national as well as international level. One of its important roles is to develop human capital of SBP and its subsidiaries. It has trained 140 participants from friendly countries through 22 weeks of training during the financial year 2006-07.

== History ==
The National Institute of Banking and Finance, Pakistan (NIBAF P) was set up on 8 March 1993 as a 'Private Limited Company by Guarantee' and was sponsored by the erstwhile Pakistan Banking Council (PBC) in collaboration with National Bank of Pakistan, Habib Bank Limited, United Bank Limited, Muslim Commercial Bank, The Bank of Punjab and Allied Bank Limited. The core purpose was to encourage the study of theory and practice of banking and all allied subjects. It was established under the Pakistani Companies Ordinance 1984 with a paid up capital of Rs. 250.0 million. The equity was contributed by the nationalized commercial banks and PBC that held 3% of the shares in its name. Consequent upon dissolution of PBC in 1997 State Bank of Pakistan took over the assets and liabilities of PBC and purchased assets of NIBAF. In February 1997, the Training Department of the State Bank was shifted to NIBAF premises at Islamabad. After becoming a subsidiary of SBP, its main focus is to provide trainings to the employees of SBP. NIBAF has its head office in Islamabad.

== Courses offered ==
NIBAF P offers the following courses:

- International courses:
  - Central banking course, and
  - Commercial banking course.
- Certificate courses:
  - Islamic banking, and
  - Micro-finance.
- SBP courses:

These are short-term courses offered to the employees of the SBP covering several topics relating to laws and practices of banking, book-keeping and accounting, information technology, management sciences, financial management, economics, etc.

== International training programs ==
The international training programs for central and commercial banking are conducted at NIBAF under the joint aegis of SBP and Economic Affairs Division, Government of Pakistan. Participants are invited from 105 friendly developing countries of the world.

== Academic facilities at NIBAF P, Islamabad ==
The main building contains facilities such as auditorium, training halls with all audio visual facilities, syndicate and break-away rooms, mock bank branch, IT Lab, a library and a rural finance resource centre.

== Residential facilities at NIBAF P, Islamabad ==
The residential block is where boarding and lodging is provided to the participants.

== See also ==
- State Bank of Pakistan
- Institute of Bankers Pakistan
