= Commemorative coins of Pakistan =

Commemorative coins are coins that were issued to commemorate some particular event or issue or issued on special occasions to commemorate occasions or services of national heroes or dignitaries who have rendered special services of great significance in the annals of national history.

Most of these coins serve the purpose of collectables only and are not part of circulation. On the advice of Government of Pakistan, the State Bank of Pakistan issues such coins on from time to time.

== List ==
| # | Coin | Issue date | Occasion | Composition | Shape and weight | Mintage | References |
|---|---|---|---|---|---|---|---|
| 1 | 50 Paisa Coin | December 22, 1976 | Quaid-e-Azam 100th Birth Anniversary | Cupro-Nickel: Copper 75%; Nickel 25% | The coin shall be round with 130 serrations, diameter of 24 mm and 5.83 grams (1/40th in weight) | 56,00,000 | |
| 2 | 1 Rupee Coin | 1977 | 100th birthday of Muhammad Iqbal | Cuprous Nickel: Copper 75%; Nickel 25% | The coin shall be round with 110 serrations, diameter of 27.5 mm and 7.5 grams (1/40th in weight) | 1,500 and 2,800 proofs. (7.5 grams (0.26 oz)) | |
| 3 | 1 Rupee Coin | February 22, 1977 | Islamic Summit Minar | Cuprous Nickel: Copper 75%; Nickel 25% | The coin shall be round with a diameter of 27.5 mm and 7.5 grams (1/40th in weight). | 50,74,000 | |
| 4- (a) | 50 Paisa Coin | November 5, 1980 | Advent of 15th century Hijra | Cuprous Nickel: Copper 75%; Nickel 25% | The coin shall be round with serrations, diameter of 23.00 mm and 5.00 grams (1/40th in weight) | 45,60,000 | |
| 4- (b) | 1 Rupee Coin | November 5, 1980 | Advent of 15th century Hijra | Cuprous Nickel: Copper 75%; Nickel 25% | The coin shall be round with serrations, diameter of 26.5 mm and 6.5 grams (1/40th in weight) | 42,33,000 | |
| 5 | 1 Rupee Coin | October 16, 1982 | F.A.O World Food Day | Cuprous Nickel: Copper 75%; Nickel 25% | The coin shall be round with serrations, diameter of 25 mm and 6.0 grams (1/40th in weight) | 12,67,000 | |
| 6 | 5 Rupee Coin | January 29, 1995 | 50th Anniversary of United Nations | Bronze Copper 97% Zinc 2.5% and Tin 0.5% | The coin shall be round with 200 serrations, diameter of 35 millimetres (1.4 in) and 20.0 grams (0.71 oz) (not exceeding 1/40 in weight) | 5,00,000 | |
| 7 | 50 Rupee Coin | March 22, 1997 | Golden Jubilee of Pakistan | Cuprous Nickel: Copper 75% Nickel 25% | The coin shall be round with 200 serrations on the edge, diameter of 35 millimetres (1.4 in) and 20.0 grams (0.71 oz) (not exceeding 1/40th in weight) | 500,000 | |
| 8 | 10 Rupee Coin | August 13, 1998 | Silver Jubilee of Senate of Pakistan | Cupro Nickel, Copper 75%, Nickel 25% | The coin shall be round, dimension of 27.50 mm (and weight of 8.25 grams). | 100,000 | |
| 9 | 10 Rupee Coin | July 31, 2003 | The Year 2003 as Madre-Millat Mohtrama Fatima Jinnah | Cupro Nickel, Copper 75%, Nickel 25% | The coin shall be round, dimension of 27.50 mm (and weight of 8.25 grams). | 100,000 | |
| 10 | 10 Rupee Coin | December 26, 2008 | First Death Anniversary of Former Prime Minister Benazir Bhutto | Cuprous Nickel: Cupro Nickel, Copper 75%, Nickel 25%. | The coin shall be round, dimension of 27.5 millimetres (1.08 in) and weight of 8.25 grams (0.291 oz) Remedy allowed not exceeding 1/40th) | 300,000 | |
| 11 | 10 Rupee Coin | October 1, 2009 | To Express Solidarity And Unity With The People's Republic of China On Its 60th Anniversary. | Cupro Nickel, Copper 75%, Nickel 25%. | The coin shall be round, dimension of 27.5 millimetres (1.08 in) and weight of 8.25 grams (0.291 oz) Remedy allowed not exceeding 1/40th) | 100,000 | |
| 12 | 20 Rupee Coin | May 21, 2011 | To commemorate the 60th anniversary of establishment of diplomatic relations between Pakistan and China as well as to celebrate the "2011 Year of Pak China Friendship". | Cupro Nickel, Copper 75%, Nickel 25%. | The coin shall be round, Dimension of 30 mm (and weight of 9.5 grams). | 100,000 | |
| 13 | 20 Rupee Coin | May 28, 2011 | To commemorate the 150 year celebrations of Lawrence College, Ghora Gali, Murree. | Cupro Nickel, Copper 75%, Nickel 25%. | The coin shall be round, Dimension of 30 mm (and weight of 9.5 grams). | 100,000 | |
| 14 | 25 Rupee Coin | June 2, 2014 | To commemorate the Golden Jubilee of Pakistan Navy Submarine Force. | Cupro Nickel, Copper 75%, Nickel 25%. | The coin shall be round, Dimension of 30 mm (and weight of 12 grams). | 50,000 | |
| 15 | 20 Rupee Coin | January 31, 2015 | To commemorate the "Pakistan-China Year of Friendly Exchange 2015". | Cupro Nickel, Copper 75%, Nickel 25%. | The coin shall be round, Dimension of 27.5 mm (and weight of 10 grams). | 100,000 | |
| 16 | 20 Rupee Coin | March 16, 2015 | To commemorate the"100 years of Glory" Islamia College, Peshawar. | Cupro Nickel, Copper 75%, Nickel 25%. | The coin shall be round, Dimension of 30 mm (and weight of 12 grams). | 50,000 | |
| 17 | 50 Rupee Coin | March 31, 2017 | Abdul Sattar Edhi. In recognition of services rendered by him. | Cupro Nickel, Copper 75%, Nickel 25%. | The coin shall be round, Dimension of 30 mm (and weight of 13.5 grams). | 100,000 | |
| 18 | 50 Rupee Coin | May 9, 2018 | In recognition of services rendered by Ruth Pfau. | Cupro Nickel, Copper 75%, Nickel 25%. | The coin shall be round, Dimension of 30 mm (and weight of 13.5 grams). | 100,000 | |
| 19 | 50 Rupee Coin | October 17, 2018 | To commemorate the 200th Birth Anniversary of Sir Syed Ahmed Khan. | Cupro Nickel, Copper 75%, Nickel 25%. | The coin shall be round, Dimension of 30 mm (and weight of 13.5 grams). | 100,000 | |
| 20 | 50 Rupee Coin | December 10, 2018 | To commemorate the International Anti-Corruption Day. | Cupro Nickel, Copper 75%, Nickel 25%. | The coin shall be round, Dimension of 30 mm (and weight of 13.5 grams). | 100,000 | |
| 21 | 550 Rupee Coin | November 12, 2019 | On the occasion of 550th birth anniversary of Baba Guru Nanak, known as the founder of Sikhism | Cupro Nickel, Copper 75%, Nickel 25%. | The coin shall be round, Dimension of 30 mm (and weight of 13.5 grams). | 100,000 | |
| 22 | 40 Rupee Coin | February 17, 2020 | Conference to commemorate the 40 years of arrival of Afghan refugees in Pakistan. | Cupro Nickel, Copper 75%, Nickel 25%. | The coin shall be round, Dimension of 27.5 mm (and weight of 10 grams). | 10,000 | |
| 23 | 70 Rupee Coin | June 11, 2021 | To commemorate the 70th anniversary of establishment of diplomatic relations between Pakistan and China. | Cupro Nickel, Copper 75%, Nickel 25%. | The coin shall be round, Dimension of 30 mm (and weight of 13 grams). | 100,000 | |
| 24 | 100 Rupee Coin | August 13, 2021 | To commemorate the 100th anniversary of NED (Nadirshaw Edulji Dinshaw) University Karachi. | Cupro Nickel, Copper 75%, Nickel 25%. | The coin shall be round, Dimension of 30 mm (and weight of 13 grams). | 50,000 | |
| 25 | 70 Rupee Coin | October 15, 2021 | To commemorate the 70th anniversary of establishment of diplomatic relations between Pakistan and Germany. | Cupro Nickel, Copper 75%, Nickel 25%. | The coin shall be round, Dimension of 30 mm (and weight of 13 grams). | ? | |
| 26 | 100 Rupee Coin | November 15, 2021 | To mark the 100th Anniversary of establishment of University of Engineering & Technology (UET) Lahore. | Cupro Nickel, Copper 75%, Nickel 25%. | The coin shall be round, Dimension of 30 mm (and weight of 13 grams). | ? | |
| 27 | 50 Rupee Coin | December 9, 2021 | To mark the Golden Jubilee of PNS Submarine Hangor. | Nickel-Brass Contents, Copper 79%, Zinc 20%, Nickel 1%. | The coin shall be round, Dimension of 27.5 mm (and weight of 11 grams). | 50,000 | |
| 28 | 50 Rupee Coin | March 17, 2023 | To mark the Golden Jubilee of Senate of Pakistan. | Cupro Nickel, Copper 75%, Nickel 25%. | The coin shall be round, Dimension of 30 mm (and weight of 13.5 grams). | 100,0000 | |
| 29 | 50 Rupee Coin | April 14, 2023 | To mark the Golden Jubilee of 1973 Constitution of Pakistan. | Cupro Nickel, Copper 75%, Nickel 25%. | The coin shall be round, Dimension of 30 mm (and weight of 13.5 grams). | ? | |
| 30 | 100 Rupee Coin | August 11, 2023 | To mark 10th Anniversary of the China–Pakistan Economic Corridor. | Cupro Nickel, Copper 75%, Nickel 25%. | The coin shall be round, Dimension of 30 mm (and weight of 13.5 grams). | ? | |
| 31 | 75 Rupee Coin | August 25, 2023 | To mark 75th Anniversary of Diplomatic Relations between Pakistan and USA. | Cupro Nickel, Copper 75%, Nickel 25%. | The coin shall be round, Dimension of 30 mm (and weight of 13.5 grams). | ? | |
| 32 | 55 Rupee Coin | November 22, 2024 | To Celebrate 555th Birthday of Baba Guru Nanak Dev Ji | 79% brass, 20% zinc, and 1% nickel | The coin shall be round, Dimension of 30 mm (and weight of 13.5 grams). | ? | |
| 33 | 75 Rupee Coin | August 15, 2025 | To celebrate Marka-e-Haq | Nickel-Brass, Cu 79%, Zn 20% & Ni 1% | The coin shall be round, Dimension of 30 mm (and weight of 13.5 grams). | ? | |
