= Jameel Ahmad =

Governor of the State Bank of Pakistan

Governor of the State Bank of Pakistan
- Incumbent
- Assumed office 26 August 2022
- Preceded by: Murtaza Syed

Deputy Governor of the State Bank of Pakistan
- In office 11 April 2017 – October 2021

Personal details
- Education: University of the Punjab
- Occupation: Banker
- Website: www.sbp.org.pk/about/governors/index.htm

Jameel Ahmad is a Pakistani banker who has served as the governor of the State Bank of Pakistan (SBP) since 26 August 2022. He has formerly also served as a Deputy Governor in the SBP from April 2017 to October 2021.

== Education ==
Ahmed completed his MBA from the University of the Punjab in 1988 and is a Fellow Member of the Institute of Cost & Management Accountants of Pakistan (FCMA) since 1994, Fellow Member of the Institute of Bankers Pakistan (FIBP) since 1993, and Fellow Member of the Institute of Corporate Secretaries of Pakistan (FCIS) since 1992.

== Career ==
Ahmed held various senior positions at the State Bank of Pakistan and the Saudi Central Bank. His association with the SBP dates back to 1991, where he served in various capacities, including the SBP Deputy Governor and executive director.

As the Deputy Governor (Banking and Financial Markets & Reserve Management) at the State Bank of Pakistan, Ahmed introduced a risk-based methodology for bank supervision, issued and implemented the latest international Basel capital adequacy standards, and established a depositors’ protection scheme. He also launched Pakistan's first retail payments gateway and took many other policy and regulatory initiatives.

Ahmed has extensive experience working in various areas of Monetary Policy and Operations, Treasury, Banking Policy & Regulation, Banking Supervision, Development Finance, Payment Systems, and Financial Resource Management. He has contributed to the development of many international standards at various global forums, including the Basel Committee on Banking Supervision (BCBS), Financial Stability Board (FSB), and the Islamic Financial Services Board (IFSB).

Ahmed has served as a Member of the Monetary Policy Committee of the State Bank of Pakistan, chairman of the Board of Directors of Deposit Protection Corporation of Pakistan, Member of the Policy Board of Securities & Exchange Commission of Pakistan, Vice Chairman of the Board of Directors of Pakistan Security Printing Corporation, and Member of the Board of Directors of the National Institute of Banking & Finance.

Ahmed was reappointed as the Deputy Governor of the State Bank of Pakistan (SBP) in 2018 and was appointed as the governor of the SBP in August 2022. One of his first tasks as Governor was to chair a monetary policy meeting to consider the bank's policy rate. During his tenure, Ahmed is expected to continue his focus on modernizing the banking system in Pakistan and driving economic growth in the country.

== Other activities ==
- International Monetary Fund (IMF), Ex-Officio Member of the Board of Governors (since 2022)
