= MNET (interbank network) =

Pakistani operator of inter-bank connectivity platform

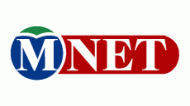
Logo used in 2001

MNET Services Private Limited was a Pakistani operator of inter-bank connectivity platform of MCB Bank Ltd (formerly known as Muslim Commercial Bank) for online financial transaction processing and offers a managed services portfolio that includes card personalisation & management, mobile payment services and ATM & POS controller hosting.

== History ==
Incorporated in 2001, MNET was the first company in Pakistan to provide a secure electronic inter-bank connectivity platform for online financial transactions.

In 2002, SBP circular for the mandatory connectivity of either of the two switches (1LINK or MNET).

In 2004, SBP instructed 1LINK and MNET to interconnect with each other.

The company is now being closed as MCB has now become a member bank of 1LINK.

== MNET services amalgamation with and into MCB Bank ==
MNET Services (Private) Limited amalgamated with MCB Bank, the effective date of amalgamation is April 30, 2019.
