= Pakistan Security Printing Corporation =

- Type: Government
- Industry: Security printing
- Founded: 1949; 77 years ago
- Headquarters: Karachi, Pakistan
- Key people: Jameel Ahmed (Governor - State Bank of Pakistan) (Chairman); Arshad Mehmood Bhatti (Executive Director - State Bank of Pakistan) (Managing Director)
- Products: Currency notes, Prize Bonds (1949–Present)
- Number of employees: 1500+
- Parent: State Bank of Pakistan
- Website: www.pspc.gov.pk

Pakistan Security Printing Corporation is a Pakistani securities printing company based in Karachi. It is a subsidiary of the State Bank of Pakistan. It prints security notes and prize bonds.

== History ==
Pakistan Security Printing Corporation was established in 1949 for the printing of securities including currency notes for the federal government.

In 1995, Pakistan Security Printing Corporation formed a joint venture with SICPA to form SICPA Pakistan with a production facility in Karachi. SICPA Pakistan produces security inks used in banknotes of all denominations, as well as other security documents such as passports, postage stamps, and stamp papers.

In July 2017, it was acquired by the State Bank of Pakistan from the Government of Pakistan for Rs. 100 billion. In the same year, National Security Printing Company was incorporated which took over tasks of printing passports, national identity cards, and stamp papers from Pakistan Security Printing Corporation.

In August 2024, National Security Printing Company was merged into Pakistan Security Printing Corporation.

== Companies ==
=== Security Papers Limited ===
Security Papers Limited is a majority-owned company of the Pakistan Security Printing Corporation. It was founded in 1965 as a joint venture among Pakistan, Iran, and Turkey to manufacture banknotes and security papers. In 1967, it was listed on the Karachi Stock Exchange. In 1969, it began commercial operations.

In March 2025, Security Papers Limited (SPL) awarded a paper machine upgrade project worth Rs3.4 billion to a German firm Giesecke+Devrient (G+D).

== See also ==
- SAMA Money Museum
- The Security Printing Corporation (Bangladesh) Ltd.
