= Raast =

Pakistani instant payment system

- Product type: Instant payment system
- Current owner: State Bank of Pakistan
- Produced by: State Bank of Pakistan, Karandaaz Pakistan
- Country: Pakistan
- Introduced: 11 January 2021; 5 years ago
- Tagline: پل بھر میں- ملک بھر میں
- Website: www.sbp.org.pk/raast

Raast (Urdu: راست; lit. 'direct') is Pakistan's first instant payment system operated by the State Bank of Pakistan (SBP). It operates using the state-of-the-art Pakistan Faster Payment System (PFPS), facilitating real-time settlement of small-value retail payments, including inter-bank peer-to-peer (P2P) and person-to-merchant (P2M) transactions.

It also enables digital payments between banks, businesses, and individuals, offering a free, fast, and reliable person-to-person (P2P) service within Pakistan. Users can conveniently send or receive money using Raast IDs, which are linked to their mobile numbers and bank accounts, making the process seamless and cost-free.

== History ==
Raast was launched by then Prime Minister Imran Khan on 11 January 2021 as part of his Digital Pakistan vision in an effort to include the poorer segments of the country into the formal economy. Operated by Raast Payments Pakistan (Private) Limited (RPP), a wholly-owned subsidiary of the State Bank of Pakistan, it received backing from the Bill and Melinda Gates Foundation and Karandaaz Pakistan. It was developed with World Bank assistance.

Raast began its development in 2018. Bulk/Batch payments (e.g. dividend disbursements from the SBP CDC) went live in January 2021.

Reza Baqir, the Governor of the State Bank of Pakistan (SBP), launched the National Payment Systems (NPS) Strategy on 1 November 2019 as part of the Pakistani government and SBP's move towards digitisation.

Raast peer-to-peer was launched in February 2022 to enable person-to-person transactions and facilitate free digital banking.

By the first quarter of FY 2025, Raast platform was being used to settle transactions worth Rs. 4.79 trillion (US$17 billion), with Rs. 4.69 trillion of it being peer-to-peer transfers, up from just Rs. 100 billion (US$360 million) at the end of FY 2022.

== See also ==
- Payment gateway
- State Bank of Pakistan
- PayPak
