= First Women Bank =

Pakistani commercial bank

- Type: Private
- Industry: Banking; Capital Markets
- Founded: December 2, 1989; 36 years ago
- Headquarters: Karachi-75530, Pakistan
- Key people: Farrukh Iqbal Khan (CEO)
- Products: Loans, credit cards, debit cards, savings, consumer banking, and bancassurance
- Revenue: ▲ Rs. 2.167 billion (US$7.8 million) (2023)
- Operating income: ▲ Rs. 457.354 million (US$1.6 million) (2023)
- Net income: ▲ Rs. 322.165 million (US$1.2 million) (2023)
- Total assets: ▲ Rs. 70.792 billion (US$250 million) (2023)
- Total equity: ▲ Rs. 3.082 billion (US$11 million) (2023)
- Owner: International Holding Company (100%)
- Website: fwbl.com.pk
- Footnotes; Financials as of 31 December 2023

First Women Bank Limited (FWBL) is a Pakistani commercial bank for women with headquarters in Karachi.

== History ==
The blueprint for infrastructure of the Bank was designed by Akram Khatoon. She presented it in 1988 to then Prime Minister Benazir Bhutto, who approved to set up the bank in December 1988. The bank was incorporated with a paid up capital of PKR 100 million which was subscribed by the state-owned banks. Its original charter mandated that the bank would employ women and extend small business loans exclusively to women. he first branch of the bank was opened in Karachi in December 1989, and by 1991, it had 15 branches throughout the country.

The Cabinet Committee on Privatization (CCoP) approved transaction structures for the privatization of First Women Bank Ltd.

After a hiatus of several years, in February 2024, the Federal Cabinet of the Government of Pakistan finally approved the privatization of the First Women Bank. On October 16, 2025, Pakistan's federal cabinet approved the sale of its 82.64% stake in First Women Bank Limited (FWBL) to the United Arab Emirates-based International Holding Company (IHC) for $14.6 million (Rs4.1 billion). The transaction, conducted under the Inter-Governmental Commercial Transactions Act of 2022, marks the first privatization under this legislation. The deal, valued at Rs5 billion for the bank, allows the buyer to meet the minimum capital requirement of Rs10 billion over five years. FWBL, established in 1989 to promote financial inclusion for women, had a net equity of Rs3.2 billion as of December 2023.

The sale agreement has been signed on October 17, 2025, in the presence of Prime Minister Shehbaz Sharif. The IHC, chaired by Sheikh Tahnoon bin Zayed Al Nahyan, plans to expand FWBL’s 42 branches to 200 in the medium term and is permitted to reduce up to 10% of the workforce immediately, with remaining employees protected from layoffs for at least 18 months.
