= 1Link =

Pakistan-based bank consortium

- Operating area: Pakistan
- Members: 43
- ATMs: 14,000+
- Founded: 1999
- Website: https://1link.net.pk/

1Link is a consortium of major banks that own and operate the largest representative interbank network in Pakistan and is incorporated under the Company Law, Section 42 by Security and Exchange Commission of Pakistan (SECP).

== History ==
=== Timeline ===
- Year 1999: ABN AMRO and Askari Bank connected their ATM network.
- Year 2002: SBP circular for the mandatory connectivity of either of the two switches (1LINK or MNET).
- Year 2003: 1LINK formed with a consortium of eleven founder banks.
- Year 2004: SBP instructed 1LINK and MNET to interconnect with each other.
- Year 2005: 1LINK partnership with Visa International
- Year 2006: 1LINK launched Inter Bank Funds Transfer Service (IBFT)
- Year 2007: 1LINK launched Utility Bill Payment Service (UBPS)

1LINK was converted to a Private Limited Company under section 49 of Companies Act 2017 on July 5, 2018.

1LINK is owned by the consortium of eleven major banks of the country, and operates through a chief executive officer. The company Board consists of eleven directors, one from each founder member bank.

== 1LINK Members ==
1LINK is the largest banking consortium in Pakistan. The State Bank of Pakistan has mandated that all commercial banks in Pakistan, both foreign and domestic, become members of 1LINK. Additionally, the four switches have been interconnected since 2006.

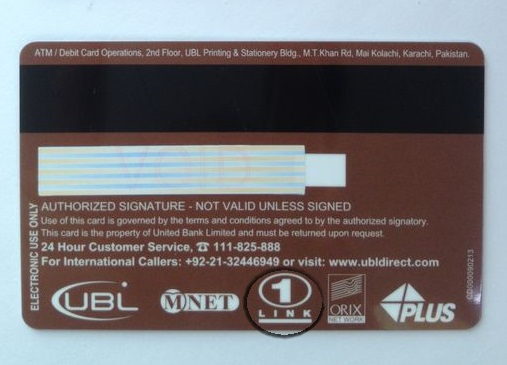
1Link logo on UBL Wiz Visa Card

- Member Banks - 43
- Affiliates Members - 20
- White Label ATMs - 01
- Billers - 4,365
- Bank and Non-Bank Aggregators - 44
- Non-Banking Financial Initiators - 73

== PayPak - Domestic Payment Scheme ==
In 2020, 1LINK launched Pakistan's first domestic payment scheme – PayPak in April 2016.

== See also ==
- Raast
