= Institute of Bankers Pakistan =

Banking training institute

Coordinates: 24°50′36″N 67°01′06″E

The Institute of Bankers Pakistan
- ادارہَ بینکارانِ پاکستان
- Type: Bankers training institute
- Established: 1951
- Affiliations: State Bank of Pakistan
- Chairman: Ashraf Mehmood Wathra Governor of State Bank of Pakistan
- Location: Karachi, Pakistan
- Campus: Karachi Head Office
- Website: www.ibp.org.pk

The Institute of Bankers Pakistan (IBP; Urdu: ادارہَ بینکارانِ پاکستان) established in 1951, is Pakistan's premier banking training institute, which aims to continuously develop and groom a cadre of banking and financial services professionals. It is an ISO-9001-2000 certified organization, with its head office in Karachi.

== Mission statement IBP ==
"To train and develop a sound human resource base for the financial sector and to work for continuous learning, adaptation and application of knowledge."

== Management of the institute ==
The management of the institute rests with the Council, which in effect operates as a board of governors. The governor of the country's central bank, the State Bank of Pakistan, is the ex officio president of the institute. The chief executives of major Pakistani and foreign commercial banks operating in the country are members of the Council and are elected by the IBP members for a three-year term. The chairman of the Council has the right to nominate one IBP fellow with a distinguished record of performance as member of the Council. The IBP Council designates the chief executive of the institute for a three-year term. The chairman of the Council nominates two vice presidents from amongst the Council members. The Council also nominates following committees to assist IBP in its day-to-day operations:

- Academic Board
- Finance Committee
- Audit Committee
- Editorial Board
- Human Resource Committee
- Building Committee
- Board of Trustees

== Institutional members ==
Sl. No.	Name of Institutional Member	Sl. No.	Name of Institutional Member
1.	State Bank of Pakistan	2.	Al Baraka Islamic Bank
3.	Allied Bank Limited	4.	Meezan Bank Limited
5.	Askari Bank Limited	6.	Bank Al Habib Limited
7.	Bank Alfalah Limited	8.	Bank of Tokyo-Mitsubishi UFJ Ltd.
9.	Citibank N.A.	10.	Deutsche Bank AG
11.	Dubai Islamic Bank Pakistan Ltd.	12.	Faysal Bank Limited
13.	First Women Bank Limited	14.	Habib Metropolitan Bank Limited
15.	Habib Bank Limited	16.	House Building Finance Company Limited
17.	Industrial Development Bank of Pakistan	18.	JS Bank Limited
19.	MCB Bank Limited	20.	Khushhali Bank
21.	National Bank of Pakistan	22.	National Investment Trust Limited
23.	Pak Oman Microfinance Bank Ltd.	24.	Pak-Kuwait Investment Co. (Pvt) Ltd.
25.	Pakistan Industrial Credit and Investment Corporation Limited	26.	Punjab Provincial Co-operative Bank
27.	Saudi Pak Commercial Bank Ltd.	28.	Soneri Bank Limited
29.	Saudi Pak Industrial & Agricultural Investment Company (Pvt) Ltd.	30.	Bank of Khyber
31.	Zarai Taraqiati Bank Limited	32.	United Bank Limited
33.	SME Bank Limited	34.	Standard Chartered Bank (Pakistan) Limited
35.	The Bank of Punjab		

== Courses offered ==
=== IBP Superior Qualification (ISQ) ===
The syllabus of IBP Superior Qualification is in line with that of other banking institutes worldwide. It is a unique qualification in the field of banking in Pakistan. Some courses offered are:

- Certified General Banker Program (CGBP) : At IBP School, this program was launched to create Potential Bankers for industry. Under the auspicious leadership of the senior management, The IBP School (TIS) aims to educate and train the candidates prior to joining the banking and financial sector as a profession. Certified General Banker Program (CGB) is a recent initiative under this flagship. Through this program, IBP aims to train the youth about banking procedures and technicalities involved while performing a task.

Both theoretical and practical methodologies would be used to provide the candidate with optimum knowledge prior to choosing the banking or financial industry as a career. Highly skilled and trained employees would be readily available for banks to choose from the job market.

The CGB curriculum was developed by IBP in consultation with banking professionals and qualified trainers. The qualification has received support from the banking and financial sector and is intended for candidates seeking to pursue a career in banking.

- Junior Associateship of IBP (JAIBP): The existing Banking Diploma (DAIBP) has been replaced with a high value qualification of Junior Associates of IBP (JAIBP). In JAIBP, the student is required to clear all the subjects of Stage I, II and III with one specialized subject. Business communication, accounting, macro economics, information technology, human resource management, monetary economics, management accounting and such other subjects are included in the Junior Associateship.
- Associateship of IBP (AIBP): Associateship of IBP is awarded to those who have completed all the subjects of JAIBP/DAIBP, have at least 3 years of experience in the financial sector, have a record of 'continual professional development' (CPD) during the 3 years, and have passed 5 additional subjects, including corporate and banking laws, advance risk management, financial planning and budgeting, and such other subjects.
- Fellowship of IBP (FIBP): Fellowship of IBP is awarded to those who have earned Associateship of IBP, possess at least 5 years of experience after completion of Associateship in the financial sector, have a record of 'continual professional development' (CPD) during the 5 years, and have passed 2 core subjects, including strategic management and risk management.

=== MBA Banking and Finance ===
IBP offers MBA Banking and Finance program in line with the requirements of the financial sector with greater emphasis on relevant and applied curriculum. The structure of the program and the curriculum is based on the requirements of the banking & financial sector. The program including 4-month supervised internship is of 2 years duration. The trainers are from the fields of Banking, Finance, Academia and Consultancy.

== Advisory and consultancy services ==
IBP also provides advisory and consultancy services to the financial institutions in Pakistan. The domain for these services is broad, however, initially these consultancy services include developing Banking Operational Manuals, Guidelines, Reports and Presentations covering all banking related subjects including Risk Management, Anti-Money Laundering, Corporate Governance, Lending Operations, SME Finance, Micro Finance and all the other products and services of financial services sector.

== Publication ==
Since 1956, IBP has been publishing a journal namely Journal of IBP. It is a quarterly publication which covers original articles on critical issues in banking and finance. Around 12,000 copies are published and circulated locally as well as internationally.

== See also ==
- National Institute of Banking and Finance
- State Bank of Pakistan
