= Monetary Policy Committee (Pakistan) =

Statutory decision-making body of the State Bank of Pakistan (SBP)

- مانیٹری پالیسی کمیٹی

Committee overview
- Jurisdiction: Government of Pakistan
- Headquarters: Karachi, Pakistan
- Committee executive: Jameel Ahmad, Governor of the State Bank of Pakistan (Chairman)
- Parent department: State Bank of Pakistan
- Website: sbp.org.pk

The Monetary Policy Committee (MPC) of Pakistan is the statutory decision-making body of the State Bank of Pakistan (SBP) responsible for formulating the country's monetary policy. It determines the policy (discount) rate, issues monetary policy statements, and sets the stance needed to achieve price stability and support sustainable economic growth.

The MPC meets regularly to assess macroeconomic conditions, including inflation, growth, and external sector developments. In recent years, it has kept the key policy rate at 11 percent, citing persistent inflation risks, energy price pressures, and commodity price shocks.

In September 2025, analysts expected the committee to extend its pause on rate changes, pointing to food inflation linked to floods and damage to farmland.

== Establishment ==
The Monetary Policy Committee (MPC) was created through amendments to the State Bank of Pakistan Act, 1956, passed by the Parliament in November 2015. The bill was moved by Rana Muhammad Afzal Khan, Parliamentary Secretary for Finance, and approved by both the National Assembly and the Senate as part of efforts to align the SBP’s framework with international central banking practices.

The amendments established the MPC as an independent decision-making body for monetary policy, transferring key functions from the SBP’s Executive Board and enhancing autonomy, transparency, and governance.

The committee held its first meeting on 30 January 2016, marking its debut in setting monetary policy and deciding on issues such as interest rates, inflation, and liquidity management.

== Members ==
The Monetary Policy Committee comprises a mix of ex-officio officials from the State Bank of Pakistan (SBP), independent economists, and non-executive directors of the SBP Board. The Governor of the SBP chairs the committee, while external members are appointed by the federal government to provide independent perspectives in decision-making.

Name	Position	Type of member
Jameel Ahmad	Governor of the State Bank of Pakistan (Chairperson)	Ex-officio
Dr. Inayat Hussain	Executive Director, SBP	Internal / SBP Executive
Saleem Ullah	Deputy Governor – Finance, Inclusion & Innovation, SBP	Internal / SBP Executive
Muhammad Ali Malik	Executive Director, SBP	Internal / SBP Executive
Dr. Naved Hamid	External Member	External
Dr. Hanid Mukhtar	External Member	External
Dr. S.M. Turab Hussain	External Member	External
Najaf Yawar Khan	Non-Executive Director, SBP Board	Board Member
Muhammad Ali Latif	Non-Executive Director, SBP Board	Board Member
Fawad Anwar	Non-Executive Director, SBP Board	Board Member
Fayyaz ur Rehman	Secretary to the MPC	Administrative

== Historical decisions ==
Since its establishment in 2015, the MPC has overseen Pakistan’s monetary policy through periods of economic volatility. In response to the COVID-19 pandemic, the committee cut the policy rate by a cumulative 625 basis points between March and June 2020, lowering it to 7 percent to support growth during lockdowns.

Between 2021 and 2023, the MPC pursued a tightening cycle to counter high inflation driven by global commodity prices and domestic currency pressures. By June 2023, the policy rate had reached a record 22 percent, the highest in Pakistan’s history.

In 2025, with inflation easing but risks from food supply disruptions after severe floods, the MPC kept the policy rate steady at 11 percent across multiple meetings.

== Yearly Policy Rates ==
Year	Opening policy rate (%)	Closing policy rate (%)	Net change (%)	Notes/Source
2015	9.50	6.50	−3.0	
2016	6.50	5.75	−0.75	
2017	5.75	6.00	+0.25	
2018	6.00	10.00	+4.00	
2019	10.00	13.25	+3.25	
2020	13.25	7.00	−6.25	
2021	7.00	7.00	0.00	
2022	7.00	15.75	+8.75	
2023	15.75	22.00	+6.25	
2024	22.00	13.00	−9.00	
2025	13.00	11.00	−2.00	current rate.
