= Reza Baqir =

Economist and from 2017 the Governor of the State Bank of Pakistan

20th Governor of the State Bank of Pakistan
- In office 4 May 2019 – 4 May 2022
- President: Arif Alvi
- Prime Minister: Imran Khan (2019-2022); Muhammad Shahbaz Sharif (2022)
- Preceded by: Tariq Bajwa
- Succeeded by: Murtaza Syed

Personal details
- Born: Lahore Punjab, Pakistan
- Education: Harvard University University of California at Berkeley
- Occupation: Economist

Reza Baqir is a Pakistani economist who served as the 20th Governor of the State Bank of Pakistan, from 4 May 2019 to 4 May 2022.

== Early life and education ==
Baqir was born to a Punjabi Arain family in Vehari. His father Chaudhary Sharif Baqir Arain was a very well known Barrister of Law and joined the PPP in 1988 and ran for the seat of National Assembly. Baqir received his early education from Aitchison College, Lahore.

He graduated magna cum laude from Harvard University with a bachelors degree in economics, and later obtained a PhD in economics at the University of California, Berkeley.

== Career ==
Before his political career, Dr. Baqir held numerous positions in the International Monetary Fund (IMF). These included being the Mission Chief for Romania and Bulgaria. He was also the IMF's Senior Resident Representative.

In 2019, President Arif Alvi appointed Baqir governor of the State Bank of Pakistan for a period of three years. The appointment took place a day after his predecessor Tariq Bajwa was unexpectedly removed from his post.

He currently is Managing Director and Practice Leader of Sovereign Advisory Services at Alvarez & Marsal in Dubai.

== Other activities ==
- International Monetary Fund (IMF), Ex-Officio Alternate Member of the Board of Governors (since 2019)
