= Institute of Corporate Secretaries of Pakistan =

Pakistani training institute for corporate secretaries

The Institute of Corporate Secretaries of Pakistan
- انسٹیٹیوٹ آف کارپوریٹ سیکریٹریز آف پاکستان
- Type: Professional institute
- Established: 22 November 1973
- Affiliations: ICAP, ICMAP, SECP, IFC, AIA, CIMA and CIIA.
- President: Mohammed Zaki
- Vice-president: Abdul Rehman
- Location: Karachi, Pakistan
- Campus: Karachi head office
- Website: www.icsp.org.pk

Institute of Corporate Secretaries of Pakistan (ICSP) (Urdu: انسٹیٹیوٹ آف کارپوریٹ سیکریٹریز آف پاکستان) was established on 22 November 1973 as a company limited by guarantee, under the then Indian Companies Act 1913, later substituted by the Companies Ordinance 1984. Since incorporation, the ICSP is functioning as the only recognized professional body of corporate secretaries which is imparting professional education and prudence in the areas of secretarial practice. Besides, equipping the students with knowledge for meeting challenges of modern corporate and financial world, the ICSP is also providing commands in the subjects of corporate & business laws, corporate governance, accounting, administration, management, human resource, business ethics and information technology. As a matter of fact the Corporate Secretaries should have caliber to chart a course of action or take decisions in accordance with regulations, legislations, precedents, traditions, best practices and to oversee that the operations of the organization are moving effectively/efficiently towards its objectives and goals.

At present the ICSP has about 750 members out of which 350 are the fellow members. The affairs of the Institute are managed professionally by the National Council. As a matter of fact a good corporate culture can only be developed through institutions not by the enforcement of corporate law. The Securities & Exchange Commission of Pakistan had felt the importance of the profession of company secretaries and has principally decided to convert the Institute of Corporate Secretaries of Pakistan.

The minimum qualification required for admission is bachelor's degree or equivalent as approved by the Higher Education Commission or any other qualification as deemed equivalent thereto by the council of the institute. Admission to a higher group is allowed, if a candidate qualifies or gets exemption from most or all papers of a lower group. A candidate is registered for a maximum period of five years and is required to pass the final examination within the stipulated time. A candidate, who is a graduate and is not less than 18 years of age may apply for the registration as a student. The application for registration may be obtained from the office of the Institute or may be downloaded from the website. The application for registration as student should be accompanied by attested copies of transcripts/certificates in support of educational qualifications to assess the eligibility for exemption and a pay order or a bank draft amounting to RS. 3,250/= being the payment of registration fees as student. Although the qualification provided by the ICSP is not fully recognized, but being a real non-profit organization, it has edge of providing the best professional education at lowest fee structure in the country. In the inflationary environment prevailing in our country, the fee structure has been designed in a manner which attracts professionals from all walks of life.

The institute conducts semiannual exams in January and July at Karachi, Lahore, and Islamabad simultaneously and is also considering opening the examination centers at Peshawar, Quetta, Multan and Faisalabad. The registration for examination is open throughout the year. The candidates registered up to and including the month of May in a year are eligible for appearing in examination held in July of the year and those registered up to and including the month of November are eligible to appear in the examination held in January of next year. To become a member of the institute, a person has to pass the final examination of the Institute. The following is the examination structure of the Institute.

The institute allows various exemptions to chartered accountants, cost and management accountants, MBAs and some other recognized qualifications. Exemptions for specific subjects are also available on the basis of qualification like MBA and ACCA. Currently, the members of the Institute of Chartered Accountants of Pakistan and the Institute of Cost & Management Accounts of Pakistan are offered exemption in modules A & B i.e. nine papers out of thirteen papers.

== National and international recognition ==
ICSP is recognised by the following national and international institutes:

- corporate association of secretaries
- Institute of Cost and Management Accountants of Pakistan
- Securities and Exchange Commission of Pakistan
- Pakistan Institute of Corporate Governance
- Pakistan Institute of Public and Finance Accountants (pipfa) Pakistan
- Association of International Accountants (AIA)United Kingdom
- Chartered Institute of Management Accountants (CIMA) United Kingdom
- Certified Internal Auditors (CIA) United States of America

== Mission statement ==
"to examine, groom and promote high quality corporate secretaries and professionals in the corporate sector who are able to meet the demands of present era and futuristic challenges to the profession."

== Role of corporate secretaries as defined by ICSP ==
- To work as secretaries of companies and of other corporate bodies;
- To work in other senior positions of companies, trusts, non-government organisations, local governments, educational and professional institutions, trade bodies and like; and
- To engage themselves in the independent professional practice as consultant corporate secretaries.
