= Hyderabad Airport (Sindh) =

Hyderabad Airport حيدرآباد ھوائي اڏو حیدرآباد ہوائی اڈا
- IATA: HDD; ICAO: OPKD

Summary
- Airport type: Public
- Operator: Pakistan Airports Authority
- Serves: Hyderabad, Sindh, Pakistan
- Closed: 2013
- Elevation AMSL: 135 ft / 41 m
- Coordinates: 25°19′06″N 068°22′00″E

Map
- Interactive map of Hyderabad Airport حيدرآباد ھوائي اڏو حیدرآباد ہوائی اڈا

Runways
Direction	Length		Surface
Direction	m	ft	Surface
02/20	2,133	6,998	Asphalt

The Hyderabad Airport (IATA: HDD, ICAO: OPKD) is a defunct airport in Hyderabad, Sindh, Pakistan. It is very close to the Pakistan Army's Sindh Regimental Centre and the HDA Kohsar Housing Society. The airport has been closed to commercial traffic as of 2013.

== History ==
Hyderabad Airport was closed to commercial traffic in 1998. It reopened on 19 August 2008 with Pakistan International Airlines announcing twice-weekly flights to Islamabad and Lahore via Nawabshah.

However, the airport was closed again to commercial traffic in 2013 due to financial losses and other reasons. This has caused alarm over possible impact on exports from Hyderabad.

== Events ==
On 25 May 1998, PIA Flight 544 was hijacked in Turbat by insurgents, who ordered the pilot to fly to India. The plane was diverted and landed at the Hyderabad Airport where the final standoff between the hijackers and the security forces took place. The three hijackers were captured after military personnel stormed the aircraft. The three were sentenced to death for the hijacking and eventually executed in 2015.

== See also ==
- List of airports in Pakistan
- Airlines of Pakistan
- Transport in Pakistan
- Pakistan Civil Aviation Authority
