= State Bank of Pakistan =

Central bank of Pakistan

State Bank of Pakistan بینک دولت پاکستان
- Seal of the State Bank of Pakistan

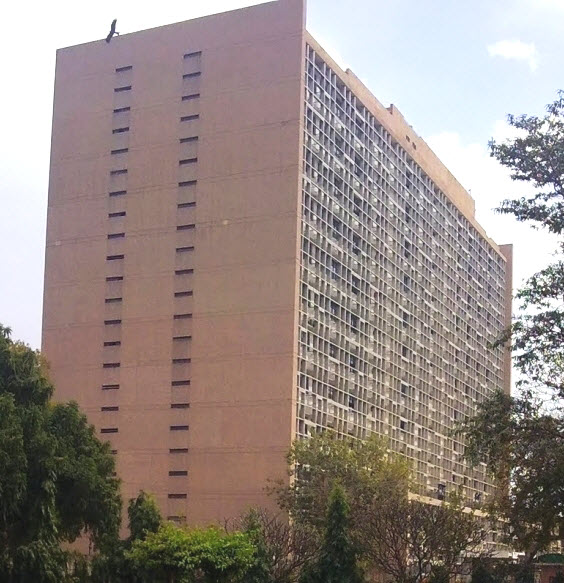
- Headquarters of the State Bank of Pakistan
- Central bank of: Pakistan
- Headquarters: I. I. Chundrigar Road, Serai Quarter, Karachi, Sindh, Pakistan
- Established: 7 January 1948; 78 years ago
- Ownership: 100% state ownership
- Governor: Jameel Ahmad
- Currency: Pakistani rupee (₨); PKR (ISO 4217)
- Reserves: ▲$16.40 billion (April 2026)
- Reserve requirements: ▼5.00%
- Bank rate: 10.5%
- Preceded by: Reserve Bank of India
- Succeeded by: Bangladesh Bank (1971, in Bangladesh)
- Website: www.sbp.org.pk/index.html

The State Bank of Pakistan (SBP; Urdu: بینک دولت پاکستان, romanised: Bank Daulat Pakistan) is the central bank of Pakistan. Its headquarters are located in Karachi, the financial capital of the country. The State Bank of Pakistan Act 1956, with subsequent amendments, forms the basis of its operations today. Its constitution, as originally laid down in the State Bank of Pakistan Order 1948, remained largely unchanged until 1 January 1974, when the bank was nationalised under President Zulfikar Ali Bhutto's presidency and the scope of its functions was considerably enlarged.

The bank has a fully owned subsidiary nameed SBP Banking Services Corporation (SBP-BSC), the operational arm of the central bank with branch offices in 16 cities across Pakistan, including the capital Islamabad and the four provincial capitals Lahore, Karachi, Peshawar, Quetta. The State Bank of Pakistan has other fully owned subsidiaries as well: National Institute of Banking and Finance, the training arm of the bank providing training to Commercial Banks, the Deposit Protection Corporation, and ownership of the Pakistan Security Printing Corporation.

== History ==
Before independence on 14 August 1947, during the British colonial era, the Reserve Bank of India was the central bank for the then undivided British India. On 30 December 1948 the British Government's commission distributed the Reserve Bank of India's reserves between Pakistan and India—30 percent (750 M gold) for Pakistan and 70 percent for India.

The losses incurred in the transition to independence, the small amount taken from Pakistan's share (a total of 230 million). In May 1948 Muhammad Ali Jinnah (Founder of Pakistan) took steps to establish the State Bank of Pakistan immediately. These were implemented in June 1948, and the State Bank of Pakistan commenced operation on 1 July 1948.

Under the State Bank of Pakistan Order 1948, the State Bank of Pakistan was charged with the duty to "regulate the issue of bank notes and keeping of reserves with a view to securing monetary stability in Pakistan and generally to operate the currency and credit system of the country to its advantage".

Initially, a large percent of the State Bank was funded by industrial families, who Quaid-e-Azam promoted. They would allot a percentage of their annual profit towards the functioning of the bank. Most notably, the Valika Family would allocate the largest share amongst these families, who also possessed good ties with the Quaid, since September 1947 when the Quaid laid the foundations of the first textile mill of Pakistan, Valika Textile Mills.

A large section of the State Bank's duties was widened when the State Bank of Pakistan Act 1956 was introduced. It required the state bank to "regulate the monetary and credit system of Pakistan and to foster its growth in the best national interest with a view to securing monetary stability and fuller utilisation of the country's productive resources". In February 1994, the State Bank was given full autonomy, during the financial sector reforms.

On 21 January 1997, this autonomy was further strengthened when the government issued three Amendment Ordinances (which were approved by the Parliament in May 1997). Those included were the State Bank of Pakistan Act, 1956, Banking Companies Ordinance, 1962 and Banks Nationalisation Act, 1974. These changes gave full and exclusive authority to the State Bank to regulate the banking sector, to conduct an independent monetary policy and to set a limit on government borrowings from the State Bank of Pakistan. The amendments to the Banks Nationalisation Act brought the end of the Pakistan Banking Council (an institution established to look after the affairs of NCBs) and allowed the jobs of the council to be appointed to the Chief Executives, Boards of the Nationalised Commercial Banks (NCBs) and Development Finance Institutions (DFIs). The State Bank had a role in their appointment and removal. The amendments also increased the autonomy and accountability of the chief executives, the Boards of Directors of banks and DFIs.

The State Bank of Pakistan also performs both the traditional and developmental functions to achieve macroeconomic goals. The traditional functions may be classified into two groups: 1) The primary functions including an issue of notes, regulation and supervision of the financial system, bankers' bank, lender of the last resort, banker to Government, and conduct of monetary policy. 2) The secondary functions including the agency function like management of public debt, management of foreign exchange, etc., and other functions like advising the government on policy matters and maintaining close relationships with international financial institutions.

The non-traditional or promotional functions, performed by the State Bank include the development of a financial framework, institutionalisation of savings and investment, provision of training facilities to bankers, and provision of credit to priority sectors. The State Bank also has been playing an active part in the process of Islamisation of the banking system.

The Bank is active in promoting financial inclusion policy and is a leading member of the Alliance for Financial Inclusion. It is also one of the original 17 regulatory institutions to make specific national commitments to financial inclusion under the Maya Declaration during the 2011 Global Policy Forum held in Mexico. In 2019, the SBP launched the National Payment Systems Strategy to lay out a framework for Pakistan to foster a modern digital payments infrastructure.

In July 2025, the State Bank of Pakistan held its policy interest rate at 11%, citing stable inflation and modest economic improvement. Despite a current account surplus in 2023, the SBP now projects a deficit of up to 1% of GDP for the ongoing fiscal year, driven by rising imports. While remittances and exports have grown, the increase in non-oil imports and expected rise in core inflation point to underlying structural weaknesses. Economic growth is forecast between 3.25% and 4.25%, but the outlook remains fragile, underscoring Pakistan's continued struggle with economic instability.

== Regulation of liquidity ==
The State Bank of Pakistan has also been entrusted with the responsibility to carry out monetary and credit policy in accordance with Government targets for growth and inflation with the recommendations of the Monetary and Fiscal Policies Co-ordination Board without trying to effect the macroeconomic policy objectives.

The state bank also regulates the volume and the direction of flow of credit to different uses and sectors, the state bank makes use of both direct and indirect instruments of monetary management. During the 1980s, Pakistan embarked upon a program of financial sector reforms, which lead to a number of fundamental changes. Due to these changes the conduct of monetary management which brought about changes to the administrative controls and quantitative restrictions to market based monetary management. A reserve money management programme has been developed, for intermediate target of M2, that would be achieved by observing the desired path of reserve money – the operating target.

State Bank of Pakistan has changed the format and designs of many bank notes which are currently in circulation in Pakistan. These steps were taken to overcome the problems of fraudulent activities.

== Banking ==
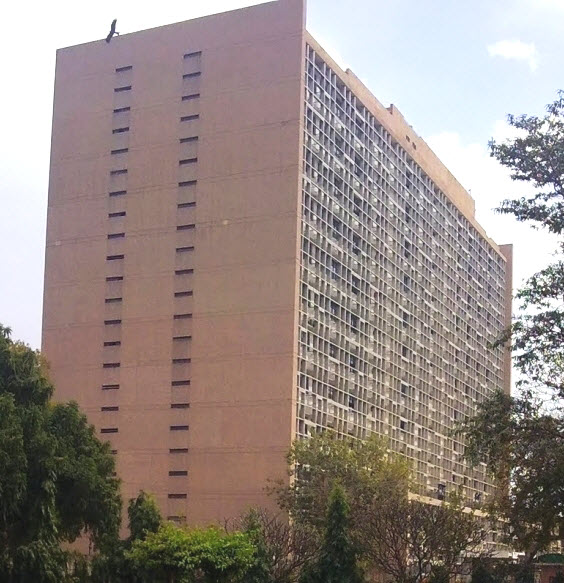
State Bank of Pakistan building

The State Bank of Pakistan looks into many ranges of banking to deal with changes in the economic climate and different purchasing and buying powers. Here are some of the banking areas that the bank looks into:

- State Bank's Shariah Board approves essentials and model agreements for Islamic modes of financing
- Procedure for submitting claims with SBP in respect of unclaimed deposits surrendered by banks/DFIs
- Banking sector supervision in Pakistan
- Microfinance
- Small and medium enterprises (SMEs)
- Minimum capital requirements for Banks
- Remittance facilities in Pakistan
- Opening of foreign currency accounts with banks in Pakistan under new scheme
- Handbook of corporate governance
- Guidelines on risk management
- Guidelines on commercial paper
- Guidelines on securitisation
- SBP Scheme for agricultural financing

=== Bank assets and liabilities ===
This is a chart of trend of major assets and liabilities reported by scheduled commercial banks to the State Bank of Pakistan with figures in millions of Pakistani rupees.

Year	Deposits
2020	17,875,958
2021	20,972,043

- Legal services
- Library
- Payment systems
- Real time gross settlement system (RTGS system)
- Small and medium enterprises
- Training and Development Department (TDD)
- Treasury operations
- Strategic and corporate planning
- Microfinance
- Pakistan Remittance Initiative
- Remittances
- Information Systems and Technology Department
- Risk Management Department

=== Currency Management Strategy ===
Commercial banks are allowed by State Bank of Pakistan (SBP) to outsource their cash processing functions that includes sorting, authentication and packing of banknotes to cash processing companies.

== Monetary policy ==
The State Bank of Pakistan (SBP) is responsible for formulating and implementing the country's monetary policy, with the primary objective of maintaining price stability while supporting economic growth. The SBP uses tools such as the policy rate, open market operations, and reserve requirements to manage inflation and liquidity. Since 2019, monetary policy decisions have been made by the Monetary Policy Committee (MPC), which was established under the SBP Amendment Act, 2015 to ensure transparency and independence in decision making. The MPC meets at least six times a year to review economic indicators and announce policy rate changes. In 2022 – 2023, Pakistan faced one of its worst inflationary periods in decades, with inflation peaking above 35 percent amid global commodity shocks and domestic currency depreciation. To curb inflation, the SBP raised its policy rate to a record 22 percent by mid-2023, the highest in its history. The tightening contributed to stabilisation in 2024 – 2025, although challenges from external debt and exchange rate volatility persisted.

In December 2025, Pakistan's current account returned to a deficit of $244 million, after a $98 million surplus in November. For July-December FY26, the current account deficit reached $1.174 billion, compared with a $957 million surplus in the same period the previous year. Goods imports rose to $5.74 billion while exports were $2.75 billion. Services trade remained negative, with $936 million in exports and $1.31 billion in imports. Workers' remittances provided support at $3.59 billion. The financing account posted a net outflow of $596 million, and foreign direct investment saw a net outflow of $135 million, highlighting continued vulnerability in Pakistan’s external stability.

== Governor ==
The principal officer of the SBP is the governor. Jameel Ahmad is serving as the current governor of the SBP since 26 August 2022.

== Board of directors ==
The Board (previously known as the Central Board) consists of ten members: the Governor (who is Chairman), the Secretary, Finance Division, Government of Pakistan – and eight Directors, including one Director from each Province, to be nominated by the Federal Government. The Directors (and the Governor) are appointed for a term of three years. Traditionally, these directors (other than Secretary, Finance Division) are re-appointed for a second term, though this is not a requirement of the law, and there have been a few exceptions to this practice.

The current Board of Directors consists of the following individuals:

- Jameel Ahmad (SBP Governor and chairperson of the board)
- Imdad Ullah Bosal (Secretary Finance)
- Dr. Ali Cheema
- Dr. Syed Akbar Zaidi
- Najaf Yawar Khan
- Fawad Anwar
- Mahfooz Ali Khan
- Zahid F. Ebrahim
- Muhammad Ali Latif
- Tahira Raza
- Fayyaz ur Rehman

== See also ==
- 1Link
- Banking in Pakistan
- Commemorative banknotes of Pakistan
- List of central banks
- List of financial supervisory authorities by country
- National Bank of Pakistan
- Pakistani rupee
- Raast
