= Brahui people =

Dravidian ethnic group in Pakistan

Brahuis
براہوی
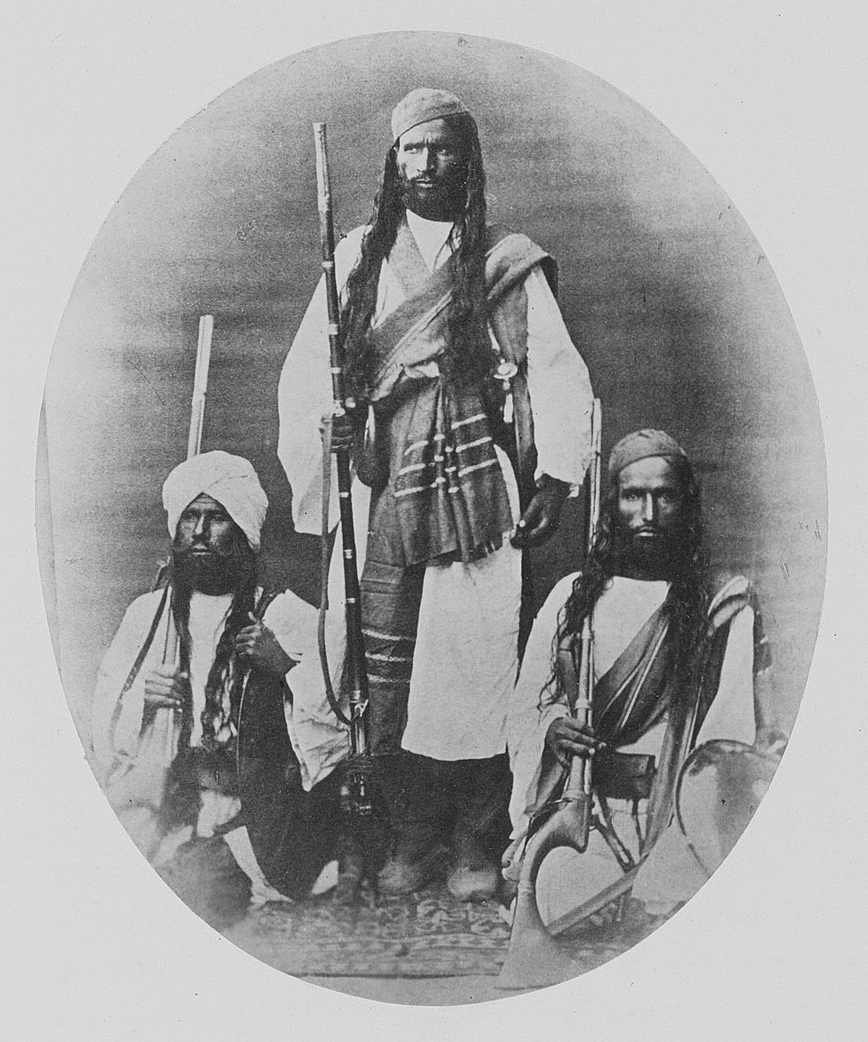
- Brahvi tribesmen in Kalat, c. 1862–1872

Total population
- c. 3 million

Regions with significant populations
- Pakistan, Afghanistan, Iran
- Pakistan: 2,778,670 (2023) (Note: This figure only includes those who speak Brahvi as mother tongue)

Languages
- Brahvi, Balochi, Urdu

Religion
- Islam

The Brahuis (Note: Brahui: براہوئی,[braːhu.iː]) (also spelled Brahvis, (Note: Brahui: براہوی, [braːhʋiː]) historically called the Kūrd/Kūrdgalla (Note: Brahui: کورد, [kuːrd])) are a tribal group principally found in the central regions of Balochistan province of Pakistan, and to a smaller extent in Afghanistan and Iran. They are mainly pastoralists and speak Brahvi, a northern Dravidian language.

== Etymology ==
The origin of the word "Brahvi" or "Brahui" is uncertain. Academic Mikhail Andronov hypothesised a derivation from Dravidian (lit. 'Northern hillmen'). However, Josef Elfenbein found it unconvincing and hypothesised a derivation from Saraiki (Jaṭki) brāhō, referring to the prophet Abraham; the term perhaps served to distinguish the neo-Muslim nomadic pastoralists — who had migrated into Sindh from the Western Deccan c. a millennium ago and adopted Islam.

== Origins ==
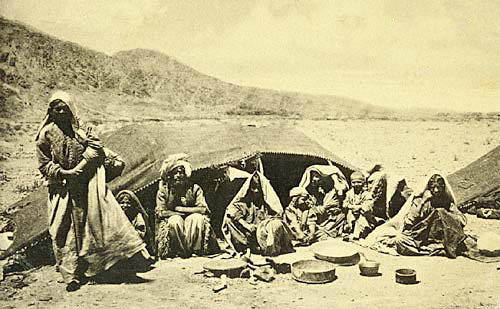
Brahvi people near Quetta in 1910

The origins of the Brahvis remain unclear. Bravui lore, which speaks of a migration from Syria to Kalat followed by the overthrow of one Sewa dynasty, is a piecemeal borrowing from Baloch traditions; historical ballads, etc., are nonexistent in the language. Thus, says Elfenbein, reconstructions of Brahvi pre-history can only depend on linguistics and genetics.

The fact that other Dravidian languages only exist further south in India has led to two hypotheses — either the Brahvis are a relict population of Dravidians remaining from a time when Dravidians were more widespread or they migrated to Baluchistan from South India sometime in the last two millennia. Noting extensive phonological similarities with Malto and Kurukh, Dravidian languages spoken as geographical isolates across central and eastern India, most linguists speculate the three groups to have shared a common stage before migrating along different directions. Sound changes shared with Kurukh and Malto also suggest that Brahvi was originally spoken near them. The absence of any Old Iranian (Avestan) loanwords in Brahvi suggests that the Brahvi migrated to Balochistan from central India less than 1,000 years ago. The main Iranian contributor to Brahvi vocabulary, Balochi, is a western Iranian language like Kurdish, and arrived in the area from the west only around 1000 CE. Additionally, both Kurukhs and Maltos speak of an eastward migration from Karnataka in their lore, and Brahvis' self-identification as migrants from Syria can be interpreted as a distorted version of the same event. Asko Parpola states in his book Deciphering the Indus Script that the Brahvi people are remnants of the Harappan culture, the language of which he concludes as "likely to have belonged to the Dravidian family".

=== Genetics ===
The Brahvi do not display a higher genetic affinity to the Dravidian-speaking groups of India, instead their ancestry is more comparable to that of the neighbouring Indo-European-speaking populations. Further more, the "ancient Dravidian genetic substrate" shared by all Pakistani populations (as well as other South Asians) does not signify a preferential link between Brahvi and the other Dravidian-speaking populations, thereby supporting the relict hypothesis. A 2025 paper found no evidence of recent genetic ancestry between Brahvi speakers and their closest linguistic relatives. Instead, the population affinity towards neighbouring populations of speakers of Balochi, as well as Pashtuns and Sindhis.

== History ==
=== Khanate of Kalat (1666–1955) ===
The Brahvis have traditionally been nomads; the state-formation — in the form of a confederacy, the Khanate of Kalat, a Baloch khanate — appears to have been a response to the increasing penetration of Mughal governance, especially under Shah Jahan, into their traditional grazing lands and migratory routes. The confederacy, though ruled by the Brahvi Ahmadzai dynasty, was heavily influenced by the Baloch from an early stage. The khans identified themselves with the Baloch, used Balochi in the household, and employed Persian for written communication.

The Khanate was established by Ahmad Khan I, a Brahvi chieftain, in the 1660s and derived its power from a complex system of inter-tribal alliances with the Balochs and Dehwaris; notwithstanding nominal suzerainties to Iran and Afghanistan at times, the kingdom gained in size and reached its zenith under Nasir Khan I in the late eighteenth century. However, British incursion into the subcontinent coupled with territorial losses to Iran compelled Kalat to accept a protectorate status.

=== In Pakistan (1947–present) ===
In the aftermath of the partition, the Khanate was absorbed into Pakistan by way of princely assent, notwithstanding popular protests.

== Language and literature ==
According to Elfenbein, only about 15% of the Brahvi tribesmen are primary speakers of the Brahvi language; only two nuclear tribes speak Brahvi as a primary language. Half of the rest may be secondary speakers of Brahvi with Balochi as the primary language, while the other half are estimated to speak no Brahvi "at all". The language belongs to the Dravidian language family and is, hence, a geographical isolate. It has extensively borrowed from Balochi and other languages of the area; linguist David W. McAlpin characterised it as an "etymological nightmare". There are three dialects with no significant variation: Sarawani (spoken in the north), Jhalawani (spoken in the southeast), and Chaghi (spoken in the northwest and west).

No significant corpus of Brahvi literature exists; the earliest extant work is Tuḥfat al-Aja īb (lit. Gift of Wonders), a translation from Persian by Malikdad Gharsin Qalati, c. 1759–1760, a court poet of Nasir Khan I. The Perso-Arabic script currently in use was developed c. 1900 out of the efforts of Mulla Nabo-Jan and Maulana Fazl Mohammed Khan Darkhani for spreading Islamic revivalist ideas. Literacy rates among Brahvis remained very low as late as the 1990s.

== Geographic distribution ==
The main ethnic group of Pakistan.

=== Pakistan ===
The Brahvis predominantly inhabit a narrow belt in Pakistan, stretching from Bolan Pass near Quetta through the Brahvi Hills to Ras Muari in the Arabian Sea, mainly the Mastung, Kalat, Nushki and Lasbela districts. Kalat separates the area into a northern part, known as Sarawan, and a southern part, known as Jhalawan. Brahvis constitute approximately 20% of the Balochistan province of Pakistan. The Brahvi community also has a sizeable presence in the neighbouring Sindh province of Pakistan.

=== Other countries ===
Large numbers of nomadic and semi-nomadic Brahvi speakers are found in Afghanistan, primarily in the Shorawak desert, in an area extending west of Nushki along the Helmand river into Iranian Sistan. In Iran, Brahvi are restricted to the north of Sistan; in 1909, G. P. Tate did come across a few Brahvi as far south as Khash, but they appear to have assimilated into the neighbouring Baloch. Some Brahvis are also found in Turkmenistan, mainly in the Merv oasis, where their ancestors migrated from British India in the late 19th and early 20th centuries in search of employment.

=== Tribes and population ===
The number of Brahvi tribes have fluctuated across the centuries. At the time of Nasir Khan I, when the Khanate of Kalat was at its zenith, the Brahvis had eight nuclear tribes and seven peripheral tribes; by the time of the last Khan, twelve peripheral tribes had been added. (Note: List of Brahui tribes.) The 1911 census was the only attempt to enumerate the Brahvi as an ethnic group. However, since most Brahvi describe themselves as Baloch to outsiders, the recorded count is an underestimate. Elfenbein, referencing estimations from 1996, speculates that there are c. 700,000 Brahvi tribesmen. The 2023 census of Pakistan enumerated 2.78 million Brahvi-speakers across Pakistan.

== Sources ==
- Scholz, Fred (2002) [1974]. Nomadism & colonialism : a hundred years of Baluchistan, 1872-1972. Karachi; Oxford; New York: Oxford University Press. ISBN 978-0-19-579638-4.
- Dash, Niladri Sekhar; Arulmozi, S.; Ramesh, N. (2 June 2025). Handbook on Endangered South Asian and Southeast Asian Languages. Springer Nature. ISBN 978-3-031-80752-7.
- Elfenbein, Josef (1987). "A periplus of the 'Brahui problem'". Studia Iranica. 16 (2): 215–233. doi:10.2143/SI.16.2.2014604.
- Elfenbein, Josef (1989). "BRAHUI". Encyclopaedia Iranica, Vol. IV, Fasc. 4. pp. 433–443.
- Elfenbein, Josef (2019). Seever, Sanford B. (ed.). The Dravidian Languages (2 ed.). Routledge. p. 495. ISBN 978-1138853768.
- Hock, Hans Henrich; Bashir, Elena (2016). The Languages and Linguistics of South Asia. Walter de Gruyter GmbH & Co KG. p. 105. ISBN 978-3-11-042330-3.
- Houben, Jan E. M. (1996). Ideology and Status of Sanskrit: Contributions to the History of the Sanskrit Language. BRILL.
- Krishnamurti, Bhadriraju (2003), The Dravidian Languages, Cambridge University Press, pp. 27, 142, ISBN 0-521-77111-0
- McAlpin, David W. (2015). "Brahui and the Zagrosian Hypothesis". Journal of the American Oriental Society. 135 (3): 551–586. doi:10.7817/jameroriesoci.135.3.551. ISSN 0003-0279. JSTOR 10.7817/jameroriesoci.135.3.551.
- Minahan, James B. (2012). Ethnic groups South Asia and the Pacific. Bloomsbury Publishing USA. ISBN 978-1-59884-660-7.
- Pagani, Luca; Colonna, Vincenza; Tyler-Smith, Chris; Ayub, Qasim (2017). "An Ethnolinguistic and Genetic Perspective on the Origins of the Dravidian-Speaking Brahui in Pakista n". Man in India. 97 (1): 267–278. ISSN 0025-1569. PMC 5378296. PMID 28381901.
- Parpola, Asko (1994). Deciphering the Indus script. Cambridge University Press.
- Singh, Prajjval Pratap; Pathak, Ajai Kumar; Tiwary, Sachin Kr.; Desai, Shailesh; Mishra, Rahul Kumar; Tamang, Rakesh; Shinde, Vasant; Villems, Richard; Kivisild, Toomas; Metspalu, Mait; van Driem, George; Sultana, Gazi Nurun Nahar; Chaubey, Gyaneshwer (1 March 2025). "Brahui and Oraon: Tracing the Northern Dravidian genetic link back to Balochistan". Human Population Genetics and Genomics 0003. doi:10.47248/hpgg2505010003. ISSN 2770-5005.
- "TABLE 11 : POPULATION BY MOTHER TONGUE, SEX, and RURAL/URBAN - 2023 Census" (PDF). Archived from the original (PDF) on 5 October 2024.
- Spooner, Brian (15 December 1988). "BALUCHISTAN i. Geography, History and Ethnography". Encyclopædia Iranica.
- Tahir, Muhammad (5 May 2015). "Brahvi". Dawn.
- Elfenbein, Josef (15 December 1989). "BRAHUI". Encyclopædia Iranica.
