= Mangocher =

Pakistani village

Mangocher Brahui: منگچر
- Village
- Location within Balochistan, Pakistan
- Coordinates: 29.350°N 66.639°E
- Country: Pakistan
- Province: Balochistan
- Division: Kalat Division
- District: Kalat District
- Tehsil: Mangochar Tehsil
- Time zone: UTC+5 (PKT)

Mangocher (Note: Brahui: منگچر, pronounced [məŋɡʧəɾ]; Sindhi: مڱڻهار, pronounced [məŋɳʱɑːɾ]; Balochi: منگچر, pronounced [məŋɡʧəɾ]) is a village located in Mangochar Tehsil of Kalat District, Balochistan, Pakistan. It is situated 35 kilometres (22 mi) north of the town of Kalat and lies around 107 kilometres (66 mi) south of Quetta, the provincial capital.

Mangocher is situated at an elevation of approximately 1,500 metres (4,900 ft) above sea level in the highland region of central Balochistan. The surrounding terrain consists of arid plateaus and mountainous formations, including parts of the Central Brahui Range. The climate is arid to semi-arid, with cold winters that may bring snowfall in higher areas, and warm to mild summers. Precipitation is generally low and irregular, occurring in both summer and winter. Nearby features include the Harboi Range, notable for its juniper forests.

Mangocher possesses essential infrastructure, including electricity supply through a grid station, road connectivity via the N-25 National Highway, and basic water and education facilities. These services, however, are constrained by security challenges, limited resources, and broader underdevelopment within the tehsil and district.

== History ==
In 1747, Mir Mahbat Khan, the Khan of Qalat, was defeated by the forces of Durrani Empire near Mangocher. Following his defeat, he fled to Qalat and Durrani Empire captured Mangocher in 1747. In 1899, Kalat State forces were disbanded in Mangocher.

=== 2022 Pakistan floods ===
Many parts of Mangocher were affected by the floods that occurred in 2022, which caused frequent power outages.

=== 2022 shooting ===
One person was killed and another injured as a result of gunfire by an unknown assailant. The suspect managed to flee the scene before the police arrived.

=== 2025 attack ===
On 3 May 2025, fighters affiliated with the Baloch Liberation Army (BLA) temporarily took control of the Mongochar bazaar (main market road) and blocked the Quetta-Karachi Highway passing through the area. They intercepted and searched several vehicles, causing a complete halt to traffic along the route. During the incident, the assailants set fire to the local offices of the National Database and Registration Authority (NADRA), the Judicial Complex, and the local branch of the National Bank of Pakistan. The attackers left the area before the arrival of security forces. In response, law enforcement agencies launched a search operation to apprehend those involved, and traffic on the highway was restored later that night.

After the incident, two other attacks occurred in Mangochar against the Balochistan Levies. In the first incident, unidentified armed assailants on motorcycles opened fire killing Levies personnel Haq Nawaz on the spot. In a separate incident, a powerful explosion damaged the National Highway near Rahimabad.
