= Khad Koocha Tehsil =

Pakistani administrative area

Khad Koocha Tehsil Brahui: تحصیل کھڈ کوچہ Khad Kocha
- Tehsil of Mastung District
- Location within Balochistan, Pakistan Location within Pakistan
- Coordinates: 29°40′10″N 66°46′50″E
- Country: Pakistan
- Province: Balochistan
- District: Mastung District
- Tehsil: Khad Koocha

Area
  - Tehsil of Mastung District: 640 km^{2} (250 sq mi)
- Elevation: 1,081 m (3,547 ft)

Population (2023)
  - Tehsil of Mastung District: 46,316
  - Density: 72.37/km^{2} (187.4/sq mi)
  - Rural: 46,316 (100%)

Literacy
  - Literacy rate: Total: (33.22%); Male: (42.69%); Female: (22.55%)
- Time zone: UTC+5 (PST)
- Main languages: 44,195 Brahui, 1,564 Pashto, 400 Balochi

Khad Koocha, also Khad Kocha and Khadkocha (Note: Brahui: تحصیل کھڈ کوچہ, pronounced [kʰʌɽ kuːt͡ʃa]) is a (sub-tehsil) in Mastung District, situated in the northwestern part of Balochistan, Pakistan. According to the 2023 national census, it has a population of 46,316, residing across 66 rural settlements. The town of Khad Koocha lies 18 kilometre south of Mastung. Agriculture is central to the local economy; however persistent water scarcity poses a major constraint on the productivity of cultivable land, particularly affecting the growth of temperate fruit orchards and winter vegetables.

Earthquakes, floods, and droughts occur periodically in the district and are recognised as significant environmental risks.

== Geography ==
Covering spans an area of approximately 640 square kilometres and shares borders with Mangochar Tehsil of Kalat District to the south, Kirdgap Tehsil to the west, Mastung Tehsil to the northeast, and Dasht Tehsil to the east. The landscape is predominantly arid and mountainous, with elevations generally exceeding 1,000 metres (3,300 ft) and some peaks rising above 3,000 metres (9,800 ft). Seasonal streams traverse the rugged terrain, which is largely desert-like in character.

== Climate ==
Mastung experiences a semi-arid climate, marked by long, hot, and dry summers, and short intensely cold winters that often accompanied by snowfall. Temperatures typically range from −2 °C (28 °F) to 34 °C (93 °F), with extremes rarely dipping below −6 °C (21 °F) or exceeding 37 °C (99 °F). Annual precipitation averages around 244 millimetres (9.6 in), with March being the wettest month. Vegetation is sparse and xerophytic, consisting of thorny shrubs, hardy bushes, occasional trees, and various ephemeral plants.

== Population ==
As recorded in the 2023 census, Khad Koocha Tehsil has a population of 46,316 residing in 5,954 households, resulting in a moderate population density of approximately 72 persons per square kilometre. The Tehsil faces notable development challenges, particularly in education. The literacy rate stands at 33.22%, with a gender disparities: 42.69% for males and just 22.55% for females, reflecting limited educational opportunities, especially for women and girls.

== Insurgency ==
Parts of Khad Koocha have been affected by the ongoing conflict between insurgent groups and state security forces in Balochistan.

Armed groups, including the Balochistan Liberation Army and others, have called for increased political autonomy and greater control over local natural resources. These security concerns are intertwined with persistent socio-economic difficulties, such as widespread poverty, inadequate access to healthcare and education, and underdeveloped infrastructure.
