= Mastung Tehsil =

Pakistani administrative area

Mastung Tehsil Brahui: مستونگ تحصیل
- Tehsil of Mastung District
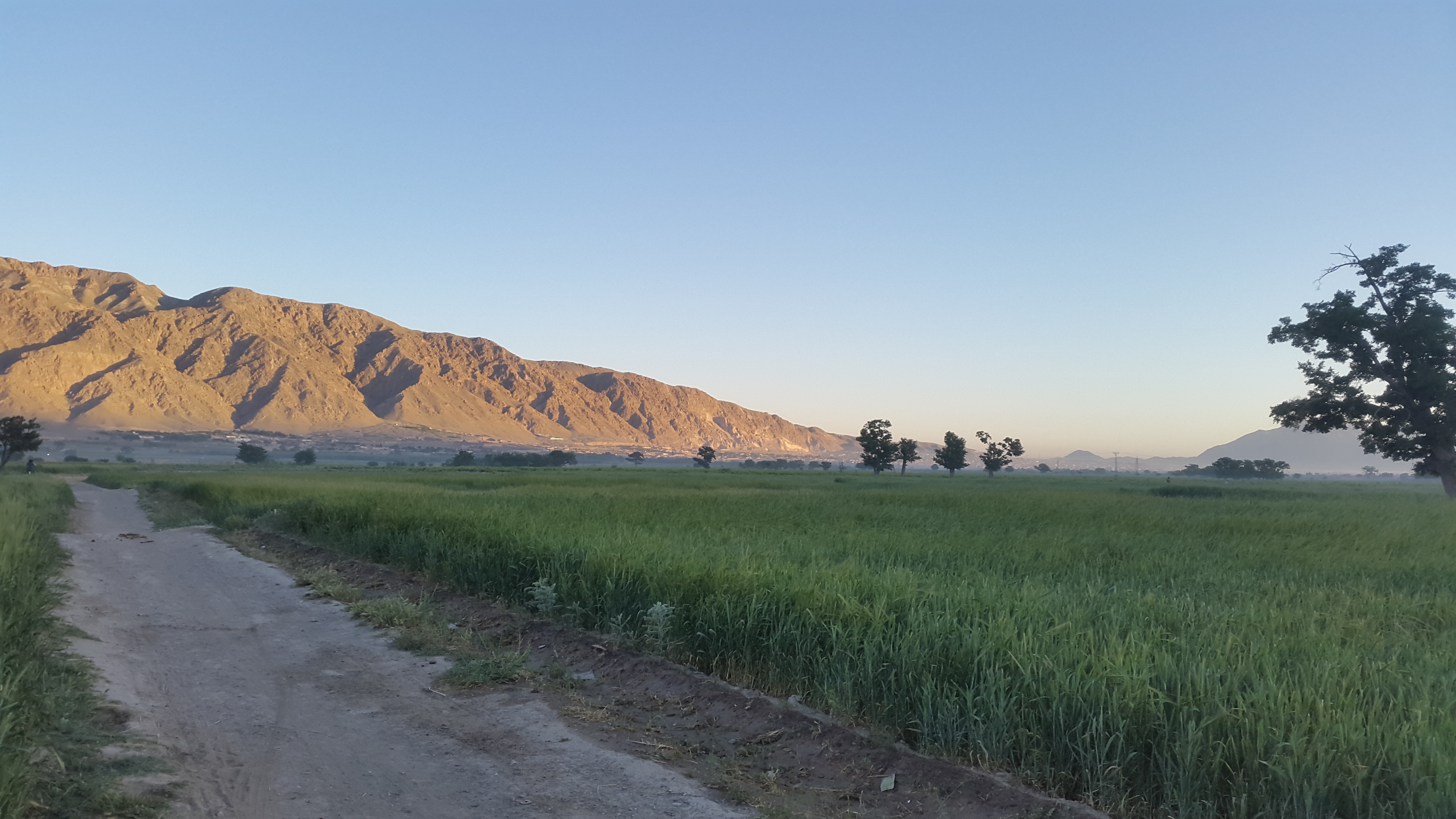
- Rural areas of Mastung Tehsil

- Location within Balochistan, Pakistan Location within Pakistan
- Coordinates: 29°48′N 66°50′E
- Country: Pakistan
- Province: Balochistan
- District: Mastung District
- Tehsil: Mastung

Area
  - Tehsil of Mastung District: 692 km^{2} (267 sq mi)
- Elevation: 2,214 m (7,264 ft)

Population (2023)
  - Tehsil of Mastung District: 162,319
  - Density: 234.57/km^{2} (607.5/sq mi)
  - Urban: 40,374 (24.87%)
  - Urban density: 94.7/km^{2} (245/sq mi)
  - Rural: 121,945 (7,513%)

Literacy
  - Literacy rate: Total: (53.70%); Male: (65.04%); Female: (41.07%)
- Time zone: UTC+5 (PST)
- Main languages: 132,804 Brahui, 20,484 Balochi, 4,103 Pashto

Mastung (Note: Brahui: تحصیل مستونگ, pronounced [mʊs.t̪ʊŋɡ]) is a tehsil in Mastung District, located in the northwestern part of Balochistan, Pakistan. Located approximately 20 kilometres (12 mi) south of Quetta, the provincial capital, the tehsil has a population, as per the 2023 national census, of 162,319 across 511 settlements, including 121,945 people living in rural areas and 40,374 residents in the town of Mastung.

According to local tradition, the name 'Mastung' derives from two Brahui words: Mas, meaning mountain, and Tung, meaning hole.

Agriculture is central to the local economy; yet persistent water scarcity significantly limits the productivity of arable land, particularly affecting the growth of temperate fruit orchards and winter vegetables.

The district is also vulnerable to natural hazards. Earthquakes, floods, and droughts occur periodically and are recognised as major environmental risks in the region.

== Geography ==
Covering covers an area of approximately 692 square kilometres and shares borders with Khad Koocha Tehsil to the south, Panj Pai Tehsil to the west, Quetta Saddar and Quetta City to the north, and Dasht Tehsil to the east. The landscape is largely arid and mountainous, with elevations generally above 1,000 metres (3,300 ft) and some peaks rising over 3,000 metres (9,800 ft). Seasonal streams traverse, or nalas, cross the rugged terrain, which is characterised by desert-like features and sparse vegetation.

== Climate ==
Mastung experiences a semi-arid climate, marked by long, hot, and dry summers and short, intensely cold winters that often accompanied by snowfall. Temperatures typically range from −2 °C (28 °F) to 34 °C (93 °F), with occasional extremes below −6 °C (21 °F) or above 37 °C (99 °F). Annual precipitation averages around 244 millimetres (9.6 in), with March being the wettest month. Vegetation is sparse and xerophytic, consisting of thorny shrubs, hardy bushes, occasional draught-resistant trees, and various ephemeral plants that appear after rainfall.

== Population ==
As per the 2023 census, Mastung Tehsil has a population of 162,319 living in 22,487 households. The population density is approximately 234 persons per square kilometre. The Tehsil faces notable development challenges, particularly in the education sector. The literacy rate stands at 33.22%, with significant gender disparities: 42.69% for males and just 22.55% for females, reflecting limited educational access, especially for women and girls.

=== Language ===
Brahui is the predominant language spoken in Mastung Tehsil, with approximately 132,804 speakers, accounting for around 81.9% of the population. Balochi is spoken by 20,484 people (12.6%), while Pashto is spoken by 4,103 individuals (2.5%). The remaining 2.9% of the population speaks a variety of other languages.
