= Kardigap =

Village in Balochistan, Pakistan

Kardigap کردگاپ
- Town
- Location within Pakistan
- Country: Pakistan
- Province: Balochistan
- Division: Quetta
- District: Mastung
- Municipality: Kardigap
- Time zone: UTC+05:00 (Pakistan Standard Time)
- Main language: Brahui

Kardigap, also spelled Kardagap, is a town and union council in Kirdgap Tehsil of Mastung District in Balochistan, Pakistan. The settlement, located approximately 22 kilometres (14 mi) west of the Afghan boarder, lies in a high-altitude valley within the Central Brahui Range, a subrange of the Sulaiman Mountains.

Kardigap is accessible via the N-40 National Highway and is served by Kirdagap railway station on the historic Quetta–Taftan railway line, built in 1905 to link Quetta with Sistan and Baluchestan province and Iran.
