= Brahvi =

Brahui may refer to:

- Brahvi language, a Dravidian language native to the Balochistan province of Pakistan
- Brahvi people, an ethnic group native to the Balochistan province of Pakistan
