= Mangochar Tehsil =

Pakistani administrative area

Mangochar Brahui: تحصیل منگچر Mangocher, Manguchar
- Tehsil of Kalat District
- Location within Balochistan, Pakistan Location within Pakistan
- Coordinates: 29°21′4″N 66°38′9″E
- Country: Pakistan
- Province: Balochistan
- District: Kalat District
- Headquarters: Mangocher

Area
  - Tehsil of Kalat District: 1,148 km^{2} (443 sq mi)
- Elevation: 1,000–3,000 m (3,300–9,800 ft)

Population (2023)
  - Tehsil of Kalat District: 80,138
  - Density: 69.81/km^{2} (180.8/sq mi)
  - Rural: 80,138 (100%)

Literacy
  - Literacy rate: Total: (35.22%); Male: (44.78%); Female: (25.44%)
- Time zone: UTC+5 (PST)
- Number of Union Councils: ..
- Main languages: 50,954 Balochi, 27,620 Brahui, 1,479 Pashto,

Mangochar, also spelled Mangocher and Manguchar (Note: Balochi: منگچر,pronounced [ˈmaŋɡot͡ʃar]), is an administrative subdivision (tehsil) of Kalat District, in central-eastern Balochistan, Pakistan. As of the 2023 national census, the tehsil has a population of 80,138 residents spread across 222 rural settlements. The town of Mangocher is serving as the administrative centre.

Located at an elevation of over 1,500 metres (4,900 ft), the tehsil experiences a predominantly arid highland climate with four distinct seasons, shaped by low and variable rainfall and significant temperature variations between summer and winter.

== Geography ==
Mangochar spans approximately 1,148 square kilometres (114,800 ha). It borders Kalat and Johan tehsils to the south and east, and the tehsils of Kirdgap, Khad Koocha, and Dasht to the northwest, north, and northeast, respectively. The landscape is largely mountainous, with altitudes ranging from 1,000 metres (3,300 ft) to over 3,000 metres (9,800 ft), and is characterised by arid terrain, seasonal streams, and xerophytic vegetation. The dominant plant life includes Artemisia-Haloxylon shrub steppe, scattered drought-resistant trees, and seasonal ground cover.

== Climate ==
As part of highland Balochistan, Mangochar has an arid to semi arid climate, with low and unpredictable rainfall. Droughts occur frequently, roughly every three to four years. The area falls within a semi-arid continental Mediterranean zone, with precipitation increasing from around 200 millimetres (7.9 in) in the southern areas to over 400 millimetres (16 in) in the north. Rainfall occurs during both summer and winter, though winter precipitation is more significant, especially in the northwestern areas.

Rainfall occurs during both summer and winter, though winter precipitation (with snow) is more significant, especially in the northwestern areas. Summers vary from hot in lower elevations to mild in the highlands, while winters are cold, with temperatures occasionally falling below −15 °C (5 °F). One of the most severe droughts in recent history occurred in 2009, with annual rainfall reduced to as little as 60 millimetres (2.4 in) to 150 millimetres (5.9 in) for several consecutive years.

== Demographics ==
Historical population
| Year | Pop. | ±% p.a. |
|---|---|---|
| 1951 | ... | — |
| 1961 | ... | — |
| 1972 | ... | — |
| 1981 | 27,156 | — |
| 1998 | 41,590 | +2.54% |
| 2017 | 65,678 | +2.43% |
| 2023 | 80,138 | +3.37% |
Sources: Pakistan Bureau of Statistics:

According to 2023 census, Tehsils had a population of 80,138 living in 9,217 households, overwhelmingly in rural areas. The overall literacy rate stands at 35.22%, with a significant gender gap: 44.78% for males and only 25.44% for females. These figures reflect ongoing challenges in education access, particularly for women and girls.

== Economy ==
The economy is primarily rural and relies on agriculture, livestock, and some local resources. Agriculture, as a main employer, relies, outside the canal-irrigated zones, primarily on tube-wells, followed by traditional systems such as karezes and natural springs. However, the unchecked proliferation of tube-wells, both authorised and unauthorised, over the past five decades has resulted in severe over-extraction of groundwater, causing water tables to decline by more than two metres annually. Consequently, groundwater resources have been critically depleted, leaving virtually no exploitable reserves. The majority of cultivated land is dedicated to dryland agriculture, which typically yields low productivity due to limited water availability. Predominant dry-farming methods include sailaba (floodwater) farming, bundat farming, ephemeral stream cultivation, and khushkaba (rain-fed) farming, all of which rely on seasonal runoff and moisture conservation techniques.

== Insurgency ==
Several areas within the tehsil have experienced unrest linked to the broader conflict between insurgent groups and state security forces in Balochistan. Armed groups, including the Balochistan Liberation Army and others, have voiced demands for greater political autonomy and local control over natural resources. These tensions are further compounded by persistent socio-economic challenges, such as poverty, limited access to education and healthcare, and infrastructural underdevelopment.
