= Kalat Tehsil =

Pakistani administrative area

Kalat Brahui: تحصیل قلات Qalat
- Tehsil of Kalat District
- Location within Balochistan, Pakistan Location within Pakistan
- Coordinates: 29°2′2″N 66°34′41″E
- Country: Pakistan
- Province: Balochistan
- District: Kalat District
- Headquarters: Kalat

Area
  - Tehsil of Kalat District: 3,788 km^{2} (1,463 sq mi)
- Elevation: 1,000–3,000 m (3,300–9,800 ft)

Population (2023)
  - Tehsil of Kalat District: 167,405
  - Density: 44.19/km^{2} (114.5/sq mi)
  - Urban: 44,440 (26.55%)
  - Rural: 122,965 (73.45%)

Literacy
  - Literacy rate: Total: (44.19%); Male: (54.36%); Female: (33.51%)
- Time zone: UTC+5 (PST)
- Number of Union Councils: ..
- Main languages: 154,741 Brahui, 10,896 Balochi

Kalat, also spelled Qalat, (Note: Brahui: قلات, Balochi: قلات, Urdu: قلات, [ˈqaːlat]) (Note: Locally known as Kalat-e-Brahui and Kalat-e-Sewa) is an administrative subdivision (tehsil) of Kalat District, located in central Balochistan, Pakistan. Covering approximately 3,788 square kilometres (1,463 sq mi), it is the largest tehsil in the district both in terms of area and population. According to the 2023 national census, the tehsil has a population of 167,405 residents, dispersed across 1,170 rural settlements. The tehsil's administrative offices are located in the town of Kalat, which also serves as the district headquarters and holds significant historical importance.

Situated at an elevation exceeding 1,500 metres (4,900 ft), the tehsil experiences a predominantly arid highland climate, with low and variable precipitation and pronounced seasonal temperature fluctuations.

== Geography ==
Kalat Tehsil covers an area of approximately 3,788 square kilometres (378,800 ha). It shares borders with eight other tehsils: Kirdgap and Mangochar to the north, Johan and Gazg to the east, Zehri to the southeast, Surab to the south, and Kharan and Nushki to the west.

The landscape is predominantly mountainous, with elevations ranging from 1,000 metres (3,300 ft) to over 3,000 metres (9,800 ft). The landscape is characterised by arid terrain, seasonal watercourses, and xerophytic vegetation, including Artemisia-Haloxylon shrub steppe, drought-resistant trees and seasonal ground flora adapted to the dry climatic conditions.

== Climate ==
As part of highland Balochistan, Kalat has an arid to semi arid climate, with low irregular rainfall. It is regarded as one of the coldest districts in Pakistan, with average peak temperatures reaching only around 24 °C (75 °F) in July. The region is prone to frequent droughts, typically occurring every three to four years. Climatically, Kalat falls within a semi-arid continental Mediterranean zone, where annual rainfall ranges from 200 millimetres (7.9 in) to over 400 millimetres (16 in). Rainfall occurs during both summer and winter, though winter precipitation is more substantial. Rainfall occurs during both summer and winters, with winter precipitation rainfall, often accompanied by snow, with temperatures falling below −15 °C (5 °F). One of the most severe droughts in recently occurred in 2009, when annual rainfall dropped to as little as 60 millimetres (2.4 in) to 150 millimetres (5.9 in) over five consecutive years.

== Population ==
Historical population
Year	Pop.	±% p.a.
1951	...	—
1961	22,185	—
1972	50,008	+7.67%
1981	59,219	+1.90%
1998	86,565	+2.26%
2017	121,458	+1.80%
2023	167,405	+5.49%
Sources: Pakistan Bureau of Statistics:

According to 2023 census, Tehsils had a population of 167,405 living in 20,124 households, including 14,926 in rural and 5,198 in urban areas.

The overall literacy rate stands at 44.19%, with a marked urban-rural divide: 68.49% in urban areas compared to only 35.07% in rural areas of the tehsil. A significant gender gap is also evident, with male literacy at 54.36% and females literacy at just 33.51%. These figures highlight persistent challenges in educational access, particularly for women and girls.

=== Languages ===
Languages of Kalat tehsil (2023)
1. Brahui (92.4%)
2. Balochi (6.51%)
3. Others (1.05%)

In Kalat Tehsil, Brahui is the predominant language, spoken by approximately 154,741 individual (~92.44% of the population). Other languages include Balochi (10,896 speakers, ~6.51%), with the remaining population speaking various other languages.

== Economy ==
The economy is primarily rural and relies on agriculture, livestock, and some local resources. Agriculture, as a main employer, produces wheat, barley, melons, and various fruits. Pile carpets, embroidery, leather goods, and palm bags and mats are local products. It relies, outside the canal-irrigated zones, primarily on tube-wells, followed by traditional systems such as karezes and natural springs. However, the unchecked proliferation of tube-wells, both authorised and unauthorised, over the past five decades has resulted in severe over-extraction of groundwater, causing water tables to decline by more than two metres annually. Consequently, groundwater resources have been critically depleted, leaving virtually no exploitable reserves. The majority of cultivated land is dedicated to dryland agriculture, which typically yields low productivity due to limited water availability. Predominant dry-farming methods include sailaba (floodwater) farming, bundat farming, ephemeral stream cultivation, and khushkaba (rain-fed) farming, all of which rely on seasonal runoff and moisture conservation techniques.

The N-25 National Highway runs through the tehsil from north to south, connecting Quetta to Karachi.
