= Gazg Tehsil =

Tehsil in Balochistan, Pakistan

Gazg Brahui: تحصیل گزگ
- Sub-Tehsil of Kalat District
- Location within Balochistan, Pakistan Location within Pakistan
- Coordinates: 28°54′N 67°0′E
- Country: Pakistan
- Province: Balochistan
- District: Kalat District
- Headquarters: Gazg

Area
  - Sub-Tehsil of Kalat District: 1,390 km^{2} (540 sq mi)
- Elevation: 1,000–3,000 m (3,300–9,800 ft)

Population (2023)
  - Sub-Tehsil of Kalat District: 8,286
  - Density: 5.96/km^{2} (15.4/sq mi)
  - Rural: 8,286 (100%)

Literacy
  - Literacy rate: Total: (18.75%); Male: (26.84%); Female: (9.25%)
- Time zone: UTC+5 (PST)
- Number of Union Councils: ..
- Main languages: 5,446 Brahui, 2,817 Balochi

Gazg, (Note: Brahui: گزگ, Balochi: گزگ, Urdu: گازگ, pronounced [ɡɑːzɡ]) is a sub-tehsil (administrative subdivision) of Kalat District in central Balochistan, Pakistan. Spanning an area of approximately 1,390 square kilometres (540 sq mi), it is the smallest tehsil in the district by population. According to the 2023 national census, Gazg is home to 8,286 residents, dispersed across 85 exclusively rural settlements.

Situated at an elevation exceeding 1,500 metres (4,900 ft), the tehsil experiences a predominantly arid highland climate, characterised by limited and irregular precipitation as well as marked seasonal temperature variation.

== Geography ==
Gazg lies approximately 44 kilometres (27 mi) east of Kalat and the N-25 National Highway, encompassing roughly 1,390 square kilometres (139,000 ha). It is bordered by Kalat to the west, Johan to the north, Sanni (in Kachhi District) to the east, and Zehri (in Khuzdar District) to the south

The landscape is predominantly mountainous, with elevations ranging from 1,000 metres (3,300 ft) to over 3,000 metres (9,800 ft). It features arid terrain punctuated by seasonal watercourses and xerophytic vegetation, such as Artemisia-Haloxylon shrub steppe, drought-resistant trees, and ephemeral flora adapted to dry conditions.

== Climate ==
As part of highland Balochistan, Gazg has an arid to semi arid climate, marked by low erratic rainfall. Kalat District is among the coldest regions in Pakistan, with summer peak temperatures averaging around 24 °C (75 °F) in July. Droughts occur frequently, typically every three to four years.

Climatically, the region falls within a semi-arid continental Mediterranean zone. Annual rainfall varies between 200 millimetres (7.9 in) and 400 millimetres (16 in), with winter precipitation generally more significant than summer rainfall. Snowfall is common in winter, with temperatures often dropping below −15 °C (5 °F). One of the most severe droughts occurred in 2009, when annual rainfall declined to as low as 60 millimetres (2.4 in), persisting over five consecutive years.

== Demographics ==
Historical population
Year	Pop.	±% p.a.
1951	...	—
1961	...	—
1972	...	—
1981	6,204	—
1998	3,979	−2.58%
2017	5,721	+1.93%
2023	8,286	+6.37%
Sources:Source: Pakistan Bureau of Statistics:

=== Population ===
Gazg's population of 8,286 people is spread across 1,274 households. The overall literacy rate stands at 18.75% with notable gender gap: 26.84% among men and just 9.25% among women. These figures reflect ongoing challenges in access to education, particularly for girls and women in rural areas.

=== Languages ===
Brahui is the predominant language in the sub-tehsil, spoken by approximately 5,446 individual (~65.7% of the population). Balochi is the second most spoken language, with 2,817 speakers (~34%). A small portion of the population speaks other local languages.
