= Lehri tribe =

Lehri tribe (Brahui: لہڑی) is a tribe in the Balochistan province of Pakistan, belonging to the Sarawani branch of tribes. The tribe inhabits Sarawan and Sibbi, and is bilingual in Brahui and Balochi.

Historians have linked the origins of the Lehri tribe to both the Dombki and the Rinds; Lehri branching out of the Dombki as a tribe, the Dombki emerging out of Rind as a tribe. The Rind being the tree from which many Baloch tribes have emerged, linking one tribe to the other as one people.

== History ==
The Lehris originally had their headquarters in Narmuk, Kalat District. During the reign of Mir Abdullah Khan of Kalat, Sardar Kakkar Khan Lehri lost his life in Bibi Nani whilst fighting the Kalhoras from the Kachhi District. The Kalhoras were forced to leave Kachhi when a retaliatory attack was launched on them by a collection of Baloch tribes.

Sardar Mir Jahangir Khan Lehri actively assisted the Khan of Kalat Mir Khudaidad Khan in controlling rebels in the Kadh region of Mastung Valley. After his death Sardar Mir Dost Mohammad Khan Lehri supervised the tribe until his death in the year 1905. Sardar Mir Dost Mohammad Lehri was succeeded by Sardar Mir Mohammad Bahram Khan who was well loved and respected by the Lehris as well as Baloch from other tribes.

In the past, the Lehris were mostly land owners; agriculture being the main means of their livelihoods.
