= Dasht Tehsil (Mastung District) =

Pakistani administrative area

Dasht Tehsil Brahui: تحصیل دشت
- Tehsil of Mastung District
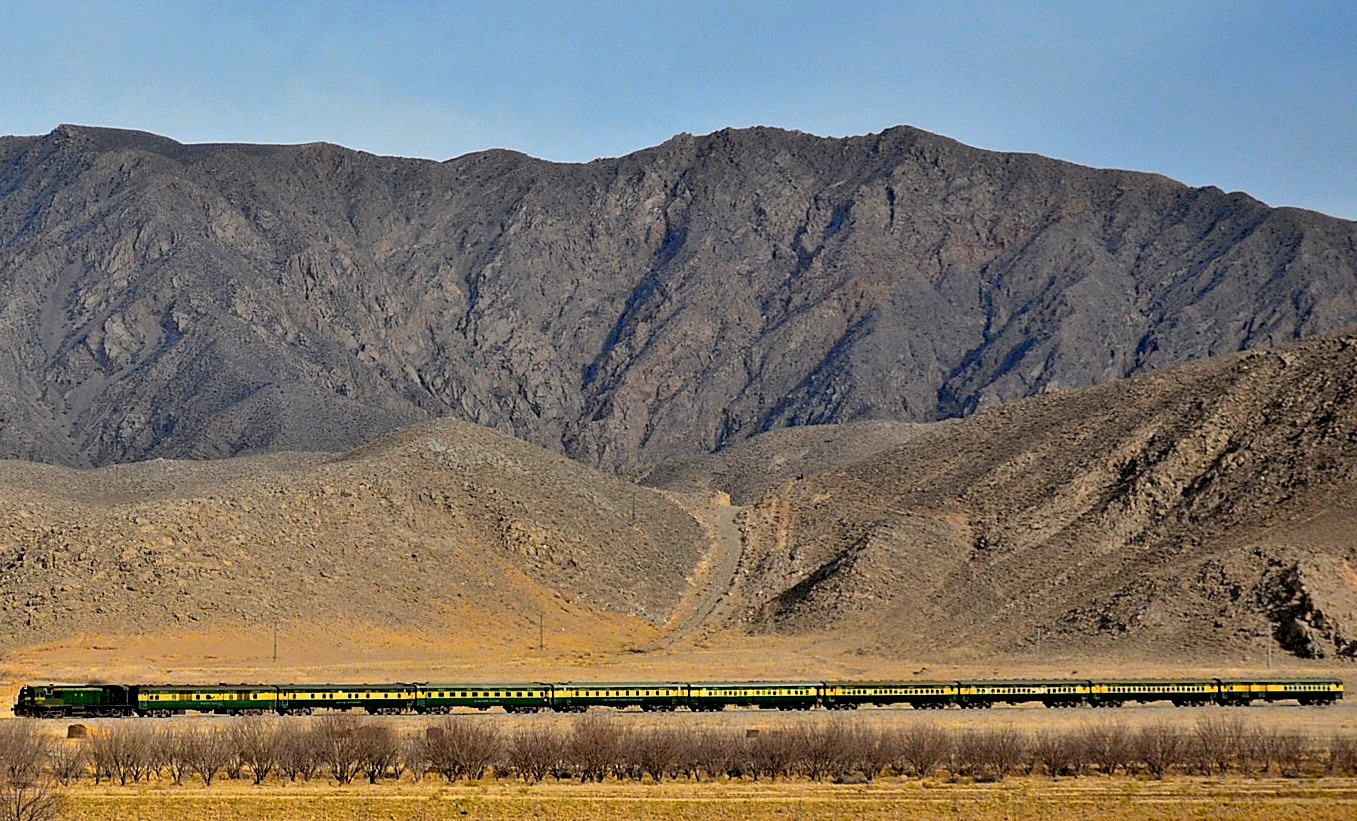
- Railway line near Spezand in Dasht Tehsil, showing a train moving across a mountainous landscape dominated by rocky slopes and sparse vegetation.

- Location within Balochistan, Pakistan Location within Pakistan
- Coordinates: 30°0′0″N 67°00′0″E
- Country: Pakistan
- Province: Balochistan
- District: Mastung District
- Tehsil: Dasht

Area
  - Tehsil of Mastung District: 1,047 km^{2} (404 sq mi)
- Elevation: 2,214 m (7,264 ft)

Population (2023)
  - Tehsil of Mastung District: 67,935
  - Density: 64.89/km^{2} (168.1/sq mi)
  - Rural: 67,935 (100%)

Literacy
  - Literacy rate: Total: (36.79%); Male: (48.48%); Female: (23.14%)
- Time zone: UTC+5 (PST)
- Main languages: 65,062 Brahui, 1,430 Balochi, 927 Pashto

Dasht (Note: Brahui: تحصیل دشت, pronounced [d̪əʃt̪]) is a tehsil in Mastung District, located in the northwestern part of Balochistan, Pakistan. Forming the district's eastern section, it lies south and east of Quetta, the provincial capital.

According to the 2023 national census, Dasht has a population of 67,935, living across 221 rural settlements.

Agriculture is central to the local economy, but chronic water scarcity limits the productivity of arable land, particularly affecting temperate fruit orchards and winter vegetables. The groundwater table has declined to depths ranging from 200 to 1,000 feet.

== Geography ==
The tehsil, covering approximately 1,047 square kilometres (404 sq mi), is the largest in Mastung District by area and borders ten neighbouring tehsils. Dasht is bordered to the south by Johan and Mangochar Tehsils, to the west by Khad Koocha Tehsil, to the northwest by Quetta and Quetta Saddar tehsils, to the north by Khoast Tehsil, to the northeast by Sharing and Sangan Tehsils, and along most of its eastern boundary by Mach Tehsil.

It is largely arid and mountainous, with elevations generally above 3,000 feet (910 m) and some peaks exceeding 10,000 feet (3,000 m). Seasonal streams, or nalas, cross its rugged terrain, which features desert-like landscapes and sparse vegetation. Native plants include karir (Capparis aphylla), milk broom (Periploca aphylla), and pipa (Caralluma tuberculata).

Dasht is prone to natural hazards, including earthquakes, floods, and droughts. Its landscape includes stretches of the Sulaiman Mountains, as well as desert and forest habitats, supporting a variety of flora. Vegetation is sparse and xerophytic, consisting of thorny shrubs, hardy bushes, occasional drought-resistant trees, and various ephemeral plants that appear after rainfall.

== Climate ==
Dasht experiences a semi-arid climate, marked by long, hot, and dry summers and short, intensely cold winters that are often accompanied by snowfall. Temperatures typically range from −2 °C (28 °F) to 34 °C (93 °F), with occasional extremes below −6 °C (21 °F) or above 37 °C (99 °F). Annual precipitation averages around 244 millimetres (9.6 in), with March being the wettest month.

== Population ==
As per the 2023 census, Dasht tehsil has a population of 67,935 living in 21,083 households. The population density is approximately 64 persons per square kilometre. The tehsil faces notable development challenges, particularly in the education sector. The literacy rate stands at 36.79%, with significant gender disparities: 48.48% for males and just 23.14% for females, reflecting limited educational access, especially for women and girls.

=== Language ===
Brahui is the predominant language in Dasht tehsil, spoken by about 65,062 speakers, accounting for around 95.8% of the population. Balochi is spoken by 1,430 people (2.1%), Pashto by 927 (1.4%), and the remaining 0.7% speak various other languages.

== Insurgency ==
Since early 2000s, parts of Dasht have been affected by the ongoing conflict between insurgent groups and state security forces in Balochistan.

Armed groups, including the Balochistan Liberation Army and others, have called for increased political autonomy and greater control over local natural resources. These security concerns are intertwined with persistent socio-economic difficulties, such as widespread poverty, inadequate access to healthcare and education, and underdeveloped infrastructure.
