= Drigarth attack =

2018 attack in Drigarh, Pakistan

At Drigarh attack on July 13, 2018 at least 149 people were killed and 189 injured in Drigarh, Pakistan. It was the third attack on campaign rallies in Pakistan within a few days. Initially, both the Islamic State and the Pakistani Taliban claimed the terrorist attack for themselves.

The attack took place in Drigarh, around 35 km south of the provincial capital Quetta, in the region Mastung and was part of a large gathering of the Balochistan Awami Party. A suicide bomber detonated eight to ten kilos of explosives. The explosive charge was mixed with metal parts such as ball bearings. A few hours after the attack, both the Islamic State (IS) and the Taliban Ghazi group claimed the crime for themselves.
