= Kirdgap Tehsil =

Pakistani administrative area

Kirdgap Tehsil Brahui: تحصیل کردگاپ
- Tehsil of Mastung District
- Location within Balochistan, Pakistan Location within Pakistan
- Coordinates: 29°44′0″N 66°27′00″E
- Country: Pakistan
- Province: Balochistan
- District: Mastung District
- Tehsil: Kirdgap

Area
  - Tehsil of Mastung District: 929 km^{2} (359 sq mi)
- Elevation: 1,542 m (5,059 ft)

Population (2023)
  - Tehsil of Mastung District: 36,701
  - Density: 39.51/km^{2} (102.3/sq mi)
  - Rural: 36,701 (100%)

Literacy
  - Literacy rate: Total: (42.71%); Male: (55.80%); Female: (28.34%)
- Time zone: UTC+5 (PST)
- Main languages: 36,117 Brahui, 159 Balochi, 37 Pashto

Kirdgap, also spelled Kardigap, Kardagāp, Kardgap, Kirad Gab, and Kirdagāp (Note: Brahui: تحصیل کردگاپ, pronounced [tahˈsiːl kardɪˈɡɑːp]) is a sub-tehsil in Mastung District, northwestern Balochistan, Pakistan. It lies about 40 kilometres (25 mi) southwest of Quetta, the provincial capital, and occupies the district's southwestern portion.

According to the 2023 national census, the tehsil has a population of 36,701 distributed across 47 settlements. Agriculture, particularly the cultivation of temperate fruit and winter vegetables, forms the backbone of the local economy, though productivity is limited by chronic water scarcity. Groundwater levels range from depths of 200 to 1,000 feet.

Kirdgap is served by a station on the Quetta–Taftan railway line, constructed in 1905.

== Geography ==
The tehsil covers approximately 929 square kilometres (359 sq mi) and borders Khad Koocha Tehsil within Mastung District. It shares borders with Mangochar Tehsil to the east, Kalat Tehsil to the south, Nushki Tehsil to the west, Panj Pai Tehsil to the north. Its terrain is largely arid and mountainous, with elevations generally above 900 metres (3,000 ft) and peaks exceeding 1,700 metres (5,600 ft).

Vegetation is sparse and adapted to dry conditions, including species such as Capparis aphylla (karir), Periploca aphylla (milk broom), and Caralluma tuberculata (pipa). The area is prone to earthquakes, floods, and droughts, and contains sections of the Central Brahui Range of the Sulaiman Mountains.

== Climate ==
The climate is cold semi-arid (Köppen climate classification), with long, dry summers and short, cold winters. Mean temperatures range from −2 °C (28 °F) in winter to 34 °C (93 °F) in summer, with occasional extremes. Annual precipitation averages 244 millimetres (9.6 in), peaking in March.

== Population ==
As per the 2023 census, Kirdgap tehsil has a population of 36,701 living in 5,024 households. The population density is approximately 39 persons per square kilometre. The tehsil faces notable development challenges, particularly in the education sector. The literacy rate stands at 42.71%, with significant gender disparities: 55.80% for males and just 28.34% for females, reflecting limited educational access, especially for women and girls.

=== Language ===
Brahui is the predominant language, spoken by about 98.41% of the population (36,117 speakers), followed by smaller numbers speaking Balochi (0.43%) spoken by 159 people, Pashto (0.10%), and other languages (1.06%).

== Insurgency ==
Since early 2000s, the wider region has experienced unrest linked to the Insurgency in Balochistan.

Armed groups, including the Balochistan Liberation Army and others, have called for increased political autonomy and greater control over local natural resources. These security concerns are intertwined with persistent socio-economic difficulties, such as widespread poverty, inadequate access to healthcare and education, and underdeveloped infrastructure.
