= Sinan ibn Salama ibn Muhbiq =

Muslim commander (died 673)

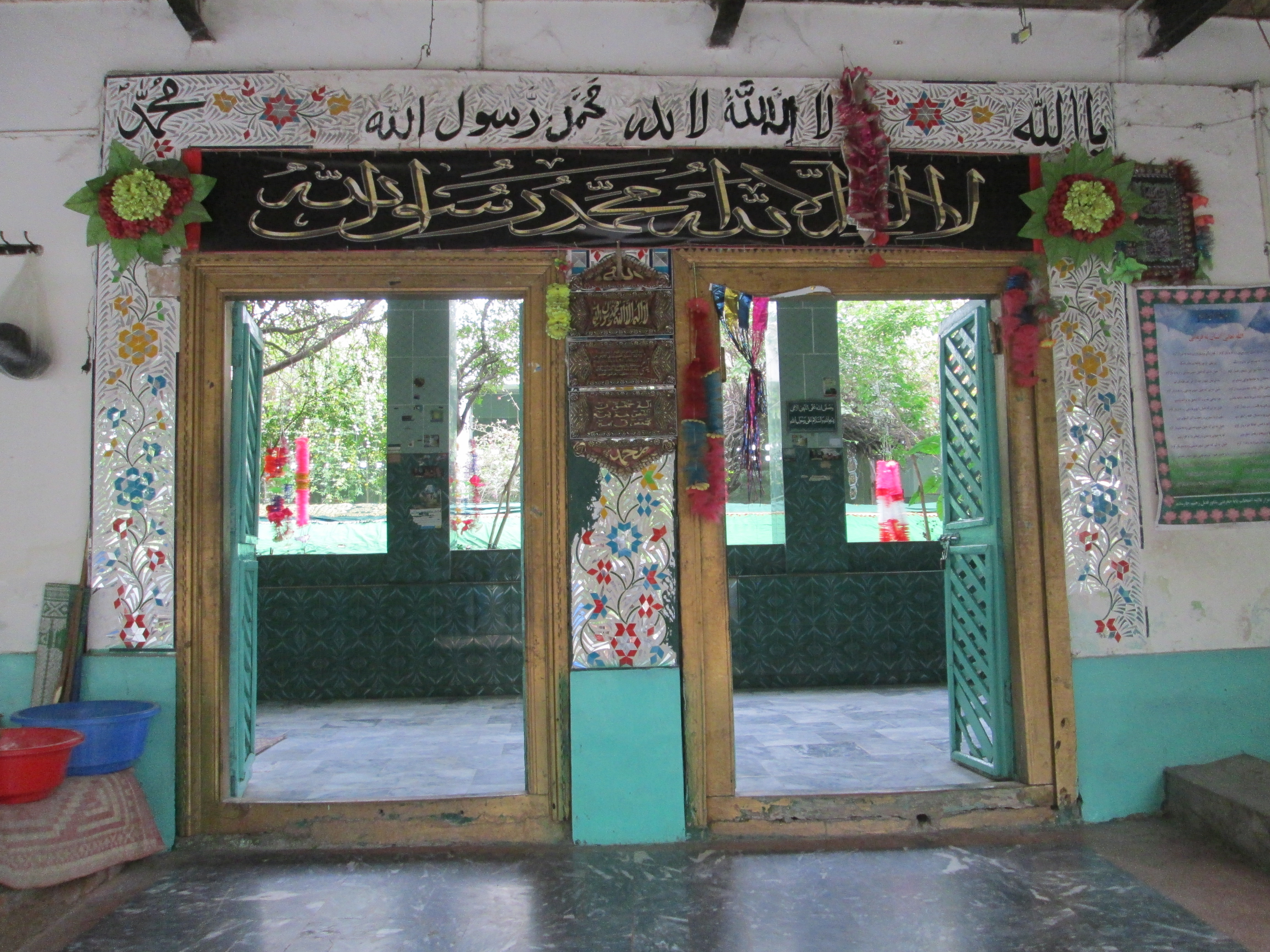
- Entrance to the grave of Sinan ibn Salama
- Born: 628; Mecca, First Islamic state
- Died: 673 (aged 44–45); Chaghar Matti, Peshawar, Pakistan
- Relatives: Salama ibn Muhbiq (father)
- Military career
- Allegiance: Umayyad Caliphate
- Conflicts: Umayyad campaigns in Qiqan †

Governor of Qiqan
- In office 667–673
- Preceded by: Abdallah ibn Sawwar al-Abdi

Sinan ibn Salama ibn Muhbiq (Arabic: سنان بن سلمة بن المحبق; 628–673 CE) was an Umayyad military commander and governor during the early Muslim conquests. He is best known for his role in the Arab campaigns in contemporary Pakistan, particularly in the Umayyad campaigns in Qiqan, in present-day Kalat, Balochistan.

== Background ==
Sinan was born in Mecca on the day of the Muslim conquest of the city. Salama, his father, was preparing to leave for the Battle of Hunayn when heard the news of his birth. He was compelled to take leave from the expedition but later expressed that:

The Sinan (a tool of war) which I will use in the path of Allah is dearer to me than my son.

Muhammad gave his blessings to the newborn Sinan when he was taken to him, and named him Sinan.

In childhood, Sinan had a habit to collect the scattered dates in the garden. One day he was busy collecting the dates along with other children, as caliph Umar happened to pass by. Other children who were playing at the time scattered quickly but Sinan remained still at that place. The caliph came near and inquired of him but he responded in a manner which moved the caliph to adore and help him reaching home safe and sound.

== Career ==
Sinan ibn Salama was sent twice as the governor of Qiqan, in 42 and 48 AH (664 and 670 CE, respectively) during the reign of Mu'awiya I (41–60 AH/663–81).

In the year of 42 AH (664), Abdallah ibn Sawwar al-Abdi was killed at a battle in Qiqan along with his army. Ziyad ibn Abihi was appointed as the governor of Khurasan. He deputed Sinan to complete the mission initiated by Abdallah ibn Sawwar al-Abdi, Sinan succeeded in bringing up under his control the territory of Kalat.

In the year of 44 AH (668), he entered the Indus Valley and proceeded towards Makran, and made administrative reforms. In the year of 53 AH (673), after conquering Kohat and Bannu, he entered the Peshawar Valley. He was killed in battle against the Buddhist inhabitants of the valley.

== See also ==
- Chaghar Matti
