= Abdallah ibn Sawwar al-Abdi =

Umayyad military commander and governor (died 667)

- عبدالله بن سوار العبدي
- Died: 667; Kalat, contemporary Pakistan
- Military career
- Allegiance: Umayyad Caliphate
- Rank: Commander
- Conflicts: Umayyad campaigns in Qiqan

Governor of Qiqan
- In office 664–667
- Succeeded by: Sinan ibn Salama ibn Muhbiq

Abdallah ibn Sawwar al-Abdi (died 667) was an Umayyad military commander and governor during the early Muslim conquests, best known for his role in the Umayyad campaigns in Qiqan, in present-day Kalat in Pakistan, where he was killed in 667 during a battle.

== Career ==
Abdallah played an important role in the military campaigns in Qiqan under the Umayyad Caliphate. He was appointed by the second caliph, Umar ibn al-Khattab, to march on Sindh, which was then being ruled by the Chach dynasty.

=== Conquest of Qiqan ===
The region of Qiqan (modern Kalat) was inhabited by the Jats, known to the Arabs as Zuṭṭ, in the 7th century. Arabs called the Jats of Qiqan as Qiqaniyya. Many Qiqani Jats had been taken captive between 659 and 664 by al-Abdi to Iraq, who was appointed as the governor of the region surrounding Sindh.

=== Administration and death ===
Abdallah waged successful campaigns in the region of Kalat, where he was killed along with his most of army in 667 by the Qiqaniyya. After his death, Sinan bin Salamah al-Hazli continued his campaigns and succeeded in bringing the territory under Muslim control.

== See also ==
- Harith ibn Murrah al-Abdi
