= Kirdagap railway station =

Railway station in Pakistan

General information
- Coordinates: 29.7656°N 66.4367°E
- Owner: Ministry of Railways

Other information
- Station code: KDB

History
- Former names: Great Indian Peninsula Railway
Location

Kirdagap railway station (Urdu: کرداگاپ ریلوے اسٹیشن) located near the village of Kardigap, Kirdgap Tehsil, Mastung District, Balochistan, Pakistan. The village lies 20 Km away from the boarder with Afghanistan.

The station is situated on the Quetta–Taftan railway line, constructed in 1905 to link Quetta with western Balochistan and to provide onward rail connectivity to Iran.

== See also ==
- List of railway stations in Pakistan
- Pakistan Railways
