= Koord =

Koord may be:

- an abbreviation for botanist Sijfert Hendrik Koorders (wikispecies)
- an obsolete spelling of Kurd

== See also ==
- Kūrd
- Coord
