= Chaghar Matti =

Pakistani village

Chagharmatti
- Village
- Chagharmatti
- Interactive map of Chagharmatti
- Coordinates: 34°08′06.6″N 71°30′30.9″E
- Country: Pakistan
- Province: Khyber Pakhtunkhwa
- District: Peshawar District
- Time zone: UTC+5
- Area code: 091

Chaghar Matti (Pashto: چغرمٹی) or Matai, also spelled Chagar Matti, is a village in Peshawar District. Chaghar Matti is known for the Tomb of Ashab Baba (a companion of Muhammad) being located in the region.

== Location ==
Chaghar Matti is located 17 km away from Peshawar and 5 km from Warsak Road. The village is located at an altitude of 345 metres (1,132 feet) above sea level. It is located in a plain area, surrounded by green and fertile fields. To the east of Chaghar Matti, Peshawar City is situated, to the west Bara and Warsak, to the north Mechani and Shabqadar and to the south, University Road. There are more than twenty small villages around Chaghar Matti, which have their own local names, such as Haryan Ghar, Sarkhana and Jogani but they are collectively known by the name of Chaghar Matti. Chaghar Matti is a central place for these villagers.

== History ==
It is believed that Matai got its name after Chagharzai tribe who lived here before Daudzais came to the area. Another theory is that the name may be given by Sikhs, called it "Chakni Matti" due to its fertile soil. The village changed names over the course of time from Chukri Matti, Chughri Matti, Chaghri Matti, to the present official name of Chaghar Matti. It is also believed that 'Matai' and 'Jatai' were two villages not too far from each another and one day the Kabul River flooded to the extent that it washed away the entire village. The residents of Matai had to find a place on a high ground to escape the flood water. The two villages parted and Matai found its new abode on the Southern bank of River Kabul, leaving behind the sister village of Jatai at its original location. The present village is situated at least 20 to 30 feet above the river bed. At the east end of the village is the resting place of Mian Ji Baba ( میاجی بابا), who was a pious and religious person of great stature. To the South West of the village near Pir Kalay, the resting place of Sharhsham (Gul) Baba is another attraction due to the abundance of date palm trees. This place is said to be the camping ground of Ashab Baba ( اصحاب بابا ), who brought dates with them as a food ration for the troops. The date palms are not seen elsewhere in the area in such a large quantity. The locals consider these palms sacred and as opposed to other kinds of trees, the branches or trunks are not burnt as fuel for cooking. However, the branches have been used for heating water for ablution in the mosques and the trunks are still used to bridge small irrigation drains.

== Climate and economy ==
It is hot in the summer, while in the winter the climate is damp and cold. March and April are the pleasant months of the year, as the temperature remains pleasant during the spring. Wind speeds vary during the year from 5 knots (5.8 mph; 9.3 km/h) in December to 24 knots (28 mph; 44 km/h) in June. The relative humidity varies from 46% in June to 76% in August. Winter starts from mid of November to the end of February, while summer lasts from May to September. The maximum temperature in summer is over 40 °C (104 °F) and the mean minimum temperature is 25 °C (77 °F). The mean minimum temperature during winter is 4 °C (39 °F) and maximum is 18.35 °C (65.03 °F). A branch of the Kabul River called Shahalam flows in the outskirts of Chaghar Matti, playing a role in the economy of the village. This river provides water for irrigation and a habitat for various species of fish and birds.

== Tomb of Ashab Baba ==
According to local legend, the grave of Sinan ibn Salama ibn Muhbiq is located at Chaghar Matti. The grave attracts pilgrims from Khyber Pakhtunkhwa. He was an army commander and along with other Mujahedeen, reached this particular place of Peshawar in order to fight against Hindu Rajas and raise the flag of Islam. He was killed in 66 AH and was buried there in a collective grave said to be of many other companions of Muhammad, along with Mujahedeen.

When Khurasan was conquered, Ziyad ibn Abih was appointed as Hakim (Governor) of Khurasan. This was the period of Usman who had scattered his army in different regions. All these commanders and generals of army conveyed the message of monotheism. They traveled far and wide in order to preach this important concept of Allah. Among these Commanders was Abdullah ibn Sawar, who was killed along with other companions in Kalat. After this incident in 66AH, the Governor of Khurasan, Ziyada, sent Sanan bin Salma bin Muhbiq as a Commander to conquer the regions of Hindustan. According to legend, first he crushed the revolt in Makran and waving the flag of Islam went ahead. He went on to conquer Kalat and Quetta. Here he established the foundation of a strong Islamic Government. Then after conquering D.I. Khan and Bannu, he reached Kohat and there, he established his rule. After conquering the valley of Peshawar, Sanan bin Salma bin Muhbiq entered into "Daudzai" and in Chaghar Matti, the great commander and his army fought a bloody battle. Conquering this place, Sanan bin Salma bin Muhbiq and his other Mujahedeen (fighters for the sake of Islam) were killed. All these people were supposedly buried here in Chaghar Matti. This tomb is now known as Ashab Baba, which over the years has assumed the status of a shrine. There are many other shrines in the vicinity. They include the shrine of Sharsham Baba and shrine of Mian Jo Baba, the shrine of Nadan Shaheed and that of Chahal Ghazi Baba.
