= Umayyad campaigns in Qiqan =

Early Umayyad Campaigns in the region of Qiqan

- Part of Arab invasion of India and Muslim conquests in the Indian subcontinent
Date	661–711
Location	Qiqān, Sindh region (modern-day Kalat, Balochistan, Pakistan)
Result	Umayyad victory
Territorial changes	Qiqan falls to the Umayyads during the Umayyad conquest of Sind

Belligerents
Umayyad Caliphate	Kingdom of Qiqan; Jats

Commanders and leaders
Al-Muhallab ibn Abi Sufra; Al-Harith ibn Murra †; Abdallah ibn Sawwar †; Sinan ibn Salama †; Rashid ibn Amr †; Muhammad ibn al-Qasim	Qīqān Shah

Strength
4,000+	50,000+

Casualties and losses
1,500+ killed	Unknown

The Umayyad campaigns in Qiqan were various military expeditions and raids conducted by the Umayyad Caliphate in order to subdue the region of Qiqan or Kaikan, which was historically a part of the greater region of Sindh. Despite the multiple attempts to subdue the region, the region was only conquered and incorporated into the Umayyad Caliphate in 711 CE.

== Background ==
After the assassination of the fourth Rashidun caliph Ali ibn Abi Talib, the long-time governor of Syria, Mu'awiya ibn Abi Sufyan, compelled the abdication of Ali's eldest son Hasan and took over the caliphate, establishing the Umayyad dynasty. Mu'awiya began expanding the caliphate by subduing the eastern regions. He sent several campaigns in eastern Iran and recruited Basran forces to consolidate Umayyad rule over Persia. Subsequently, several campaigns were made against Turk Shahis in Kabul. He sent an army to Qiqan in 658/59, which suffered a defeat with its commander and most of the army being killed.

The ruler of Qīqān, a region of northern Sindh adjacent to Makran, was granted the title Qīqān Shah by the kings of Persia. According to al-Baladhuri, the inhabitants of Qiqan were Jats (Zuṭṭ). The Sindhi word Qiqan or Kaykân meant 'excellent horse', as the region was known for fine breed of horses.

In the early period, Muslims suffered severe losses in this region. In 662 (42 AH), al-Harith ibn Murra al-Abdi was killed along with his army. In the same year, Rāshid ibn Amr al-Jadidi al-Abdi arrived and was also killed. Later, in 665 (45 AH), Abdallah ibn Sawwar al-Abdi achieved notable victories in the area and appointed Karz ibn Wabara al-Harithi as his deputy before departing for Syria to present himself before Mu'awiya I. However, upon his return, he too was killed along with the Muslim army. Subsequently, in 668 (48 AH), Sinan ibn Salamah al-Hudhali carried out a large-scale campaign, establishing peace and security throughout the region. Throughout this entire period, the name of the ruler of Qiqan appears only in connection with the campaigns of 664 (44 AH), despite repeated setbacks suffered by Muslims within his territory. It is evident that Qiqan Shah must have been involved in these expeditions, and like other local rulers, he likely confronted the Muslim forces. However, he did not openly come to the forefront, which is why his name is largely absent from historical accounts. During the campaigns of 665 (45 AH), however, he did emerge, acknowledged his defeat, and paid the jizya to Abdallah ibn Sawwar, presenting valuable and rare items as gifts. Qadi Rashid ibn Zubayr writes: "The ruler of Qiqan secured peace by paying the jizya and sent such exceptional gifts and curiosities from Sindh as had never been seen before." Some of these significant gifts were later presented by Ibn Sawwar to Mu'awiya I. Thus, the ruler of Qiqan, having recognized the change in circumstances, altered his policy toward the Muslims and chose negotiation over confrontation. However, in 667 (47 AH), two years later, the killing of Ibn Sawwar and most of his forces in Qiqan indicates a renewed shift in his stance. After this, his name does not appear again in the sources, although Qiqan remained fully under Muslim control, suggesting that he ultimately adopted a loyal and peace-oriented position.

== Campaigns ==
In 662, al-Harith ibn Murra al-Abdi who had succeeded in his previous campaign against Qiqan during Ali's reign, was slain along with some of his troops in Qiqan.

Mu'awiya I sent a military expedition to frontier under al-Muhallab ibn Abi Sufra. The Umayyad forces advanced up to Bannu and Lahore, two regions between Kabul and Multan. They marched southwards towards Qiqan, but were attacked by the Turks (Zunbils, according to André Wink) and Medes. Eighteen Turks attacked the Umayyads. All of them were defeated and killed by the Umayyads.

Abdallah ibn Sawwar al-Abdi was dispatched with 4,000 troops in order to invade Qiqan. Qiqan had various spoils including horses and the inhabitants rebelled in the protection of the mountains. Upon their arrival in the territory of Qiqan, the Arab forces were attacked by the troops of the provincial chiefs of the Jats and Medes. The Muslims routed the first assault, but the local population rose up in large numbers. They occupied the mountain passes, clashing with the Arab forces. Abdullah ibn Sawad was killed in the conflict, and the Arab forces were defeated to Makran.

Rashid ibn Amr and Sinan ibn Salama ibn Muhbiq were sent for the conquest of Sindh. Sinan made the troops make an obligation to divorce their wives if they fled. They first attempted to invade Makran. Although Sinan managed to establish control over some regions of Makran, the locals rebelled against him. Rashid and Sinan reached Qiqan in order to collect revenues and established a garrison town in Makran for further conquests. They arrived in the mountains of Bharj and Mauzar whose inhabitants gathered 50,000 troops against the Arabs. A violent clash took place between the two sides which lasted from Fajr to Zuhr and Rashid was killed. Sinan managed to defeat them, but the people of Budhia then staged an uprising against Sinan and killed him.

In 704 CE, al-Hajjaj ibn Yusuf dispatched a certain Mujja'a ibn Si'r to subdue a group of rebels known as the "Ilāfīs"; the Ilāfīs fled to Sindh before Mudjja's arrival. However, Mudjja subdued the local tribes of Qiqan or the "tribes of Kandabil", who had likely cooperated with the Ilāfīs. Following these events, the Brahmin ruler, Dahir of Aror occupied Qiqan and installed his nephew, Dhol, son of Chandar, as governor of Qiqan. Later, Muhammad ibn al-Qasim successfully conquered Sind in 711 CE. Qiqan was incorporated as an administrative district within the province of al-Sind, and finally the area entered a period of stability.

Expeditions against the Jats of Qiqan continued to be sent as late as 844.
