= Kūrd =

Tribe of Balochistan, Pakistan

The Kūrd (کُرد، کورد) are a Brahui tribe of Balochistan in Pakistan, Afghanistan, and Iran. They belong to the Sarawan group and speak the Dravidian Brahui language. Josef Elfenbein contends that they are among the first Brahui-speakers to have come in contact with outsiders in the former Khanate of Kalat, as they appear in a certain oral tradition of the Persian-speaking Dehwars of Mastung District, where they are known as Kūrdgalla 'Kurd-people'. This term is likely to have been the source of Kūrdgāl, the name by which the Kūrd are known to the Baloch and the Jats, among whom it has been reinterpreted as meaning "speaker of Kūrd. They are Brahui and are not to be confused with the Kurd tribe of the Mazari tribe of the Baloch proper.

Henry Walter Bellew described the Kūrd as a Brahui tribe descending from the Kurds of Kurdistan, who had a dynasty in Luristan that was absorbed by Shah Abbas in the 12th century, causing many of them to migrate to Balochistan, including in Sistan and Afghanistan, where Shamsuddin Kurd established the Malik Kurd dynasty in Ghor as he served as governor of Khorasan for Ghiyath al-Din Muhammad. However, Josef Elfenbein dismissed the connection between the Kurd Brahui tribe and the Kurds of Western Asia as folk etymology used by the Kurd Brahuis but was implausible, claiming that Brahui tribe had a long "u" whereas the Kurds had a short "u". However, in Balochi and Brahui, the Brahui Kurd could have also been spelt as "کُرد" instead of "کورد", using the short "u" vowel like the Kurds of West Asia. M.S. Khan Baloch claimed that the Brahui Kurd were of Kurdish origin and that the ancestor dialect of Kurdgali was still spoken in Kurdistan by the 20th century. In several regions, all Brahuis were called Kurd, whether or not they were from the Kurd tribe. Before British colonization, the Brahui language was mostly known as Kurdi or Kurdgali, with Brahui later becoming dominant.

== Bibliography ==
- Elfenbein, Josef H. (1987). "A periplus of the 'Brahui Problem'". Studia Iranica. 16 (2): 215–233. doi:10.2143/SI.16.2.2014604.
- Scholz, Fred (2002) [1974]. Nomadism & colonialism : a hundred years of Baluchistan, 1872-1972. Karachi; Oxford; New York: Oxford University Press. ISBN 978-0-19-579638-4.
