= Johan Tehsil =

Pakistani administrative area

Johan Tehsil Brahui: جوہان تحصیل
- Sub-Tehsil of Kalat District
- Location within Balochistan, Pakistan Location within Pakistan
- Coordinates: 29°18′N 67°0′E
- Country: Pakistan
- Province: Balochistan
- District: Kalat District
- Headquarters: Johan

Area
  - Sub-Tehsil of Kalat District: 1,328 km^{2} (513 sq mi)
- Elevation: 1,000–3,000 m (3,300–9,800 ft)

Population (2023)
  - Sub-Tehsil of Kalat District: 15,731
  - Density: 11.85/km^{2} (30.7/sq mi)
  - Rural: 15,731 (100%)

Literacy
  - Literacy rate: Total: (27.49%); Male: (36.65%); Female: (17.91%)
- Time zone: UTC+5 (PST)
- Number of Union Councils: ..
- Main languages: 11,037 Brahui (70.2%), 4,653 Balochi (29.6%)

Johan, (Note: Brahui: جوہان, Balochi: جوہان, Urdu: جوہان, pronounced [d͡ʒoːˈɦɑːn]) is a sub-tehsil (administrative subdivision) of Kalat District in central Balochistan, Pakistan. Spanning an area of approximately 1,328 square kilometres (513 sq mi), it is the smallest tehsil in the district by area. According to the 2023 national census, Johan is home to 15,731 residents, dispersed across 60 exclusively rural settlements.

Situated at an elevation exceeding 1,500 metres (4,900 ft), the tehsil experiences a predominantly arid highland climate, characterised by limited and irregular precipitation as well as marked seasonal temperature variation.

== Geography ==
Johan lies approximately 33 kilometres (21 mi) east of Mangocher and the N-25 National Highway, encompassing roughly 1,328 square kilometres (132,800 ha). It is bordered by Gazg Tehsil to the south, Kalat Tehsil to the west, Dasht Tehsil and Mach Tehsil to the north, and Dhadar Tehsil and Sanni Tehsil (both in Kachhi District) to the east.

The landscape is predominantly mountainous, with elevations ranging from 1,000 metres (3,300 ft) to over 3,000 metres (9,800 ft). It features arid terrain punctuated by seasonal watercourses and xerophytic vegetation, such as Artemisia-Haloxylon shrub steppe, drought-resistant trees, and ephemeral flora adapted to dry conditions.

== Climate ==
As part of highland Balochistan, Johan has an arid to semi arid climate, marked by low erratic rainfall. Kalat District is among the coldest regions in Pakistan, with summer peak temperatures averaging around 24 °C (75 °F) in July. Droughts occur frequently, typically every three to four years.

Climatically, the region falls within a semi-arid continental Mediterranean zone. Annual rainfall varies between 200 millimetres (7.9 in) and 400 millimetres (16 in), with winter precipitation generally more significant than summer rainfall. Snowfall is common in winter, with temperatures often dropping below −15 °C (5 °F). One of the most severe droughts occurred in 2009, when annual rainfall declined to as low as 60 millimetres (2.4 in), persisting over five consecutive years.

== Population ==
Historical population
Year	Pop.	±% p.a.
1972	...	—
1981	21,850	—
1998	12,299	−3.32%
2017	10,708	−0.73%
2023	15,731	+6.62%
Sources:Source: Pakistan Bureau of Statistics:

Johan's population of 15,731 people is spread across 2,486 households. The overall literacy rate stands at 27.49% with notable gender gap: 36.65% among men and just 17.91% among women. These figures reflect ongoing challenges in access to education, particularly for girls and women in rural areas.

=== Languages ===
Brahui is the predominant language in the sub-tehsil, spoken by approximately 11,037 individual (~70.2% of the population). Balochi is the second most spoken language, with 4,653 speakers (~29.6%). A small portion of the population speaks other local languages.

== See also ==
- Districts of Balochistan, Pakistan
- Tehsils of Pakistan
- Tehsils of Balochistan
