= Mastung, Pakistan =

Mastung مستونگ
- Town
- Location within Balochistan, Pakistan Location within Pakistan
- Coordinates: 29°47′56″N 66°50′50″E
- Country: Pakistan
- Province: Balochistan
- Division: Quetta
- District: Mastung

Government
  - Type: Municipal Committee
  - Chairman: Vacant
  - Vice-Chairman: Vacant
- Elevation: 1,701 m (5,581 ft)

Population (2023)
  - Town: 40,374
- Time zone: UTC+5 (PST)
- Number of Union councils: 2

Mastung (Balochi and Urdu: مستونگ), is a town in the Balochistan province of Pakistan and serves as headquarters of Mastung District. It sits at an altitude of 1,701 metres (5583 feet). and is also the administrative centre for Mastung Tehsil, a subdivision of the district. Primary languages spoken by the people in Mastung are Brahui and Balochi.

== History ==
Mastung was known to the 10th-century geographers al-Muqaddasi and Istakhri, who both listed it among the towns in the province of Bālis, also called Bālish or Wālishtān, whose capital was Sibi.

The Ain-i-Akbari, written during the reign of the Mughal emperor Akbar in the late 1500s, lists Mastung as one of the 24 mahals included in the Sarkar of Kandahar. At that time, Mastung was defended by a mud brick fort and produced a yearly revenue of 10 tumans and 8,000 dinars in cash alongside 470 kharwars of grain. Its population was a mixture of Afghans and Balochs.

The 2017 Mastung suicide bombing killed 28 and injured 40. A 2018 suicide bombing killed 149 and injured 186. The town was once again the site of a suicide bombing in 2023.

== Demographics ==
=== Population ===
Historical population
Year	Pop.	±% p.a.
1951	2,792	—
1961	5,962	+7.88%
1972	10,397	+5.19%
1981	16,450	+5.23%
1998	24,131	+2.28%
2017	34,997	+1.98%
2023	40,374	+2.41%

As of the 2023 census, Mastung had a population of 40,374.

There are numerous Baloch as well as Pashtun tribes populated in Mastung, the tribes include Alizai, Bangulzai, Shahwani, Pirkani, Sarpara, Raisani and Muhammad Shahi Khilji]], which are the most common tribes and are politically active and leading in the area other tribes include Dehwar, Lehri, Satakzai, Bangulzai, Tareen and several more.

=== Religion ===
Religious groups in Mastung City (1941 & 2017)
Religious group	1941		2017	
Religious group	Pop.	%	Pop.	%
Islam	2,963	94.36%	34,369	98.21%
Hinduism	124	3.95%	416	1.19%
Sikhism	28	0.89%	—N/a	—N/a
Christianity	25	0.8%	201	0.57%
Others	0	0%	11	0.03%
Total population	3,140	100%	34,997	100%

== See also ==
- Mastung Valley
- Khwaja Ibrahim Yukpasi
- Baluchistan Agency

== Notes ==
- Mastung, Pakistan at GEOnet Names Server
