= Al-Harith ibn Murra al-Abdi =

Rashidun military leader (died 662)

Harith ibn Murrah al-Abdi

Personal details
- Died: 662 CE Qiqan (present-day Kalat, Pakistan)
- Military career
- Allegiance: Rashidun Caliphate
- Branch: Rashidun army
- Service years: During the caliphate of Uthman ibn Affan and Ali ibn Abi Talib
- Conflicts: Ali's Eastern Campaigns; Mu'awiya I's Sindh Campaigns †

Al-Harith ibn Murra al-Abdi (Arabic: الحارث بن مرة العبدي; died 662) was an Arab military commander and governor during the early Muslim conquests. He belonged to the Rabi'a branch of the Abd al-Qays tribe, and is known for his service as the qadi (justice) of Makran in contemporary Pakistan, during the caliphate of Uthman ibn Affan. He was also a notable military leader, and was killed during the reign of Ali ibn Abi Talib in 662 at Qiqan in a battle.

== Background ==
Harith belonged to the Rabi'a branch of the Abd al-Qays tribe. His tribe was prominent in the early Islamic community, contributing many members to the Islamic cause.

== Career ==
=== Qadi of Makran ===
During the caliphate of Uthman ibn Affan, Harith ibn Murrah al-Abdi served as the qadi (justice) of Makran.

=== Military campaigns ===
Harith played an important role in expanding the influence of Islam into the far southeastern provinces. He, along with his 1,000 warriors, advanced into the territory of Makran, increasing the reach of the Islamic state. Alongside Sayfi ibn Fil 'al-Shaybani, another officer of Ali's army, Harith ibn Murrah al-Abdi attacked Sindhi bandits.

=== Conquest of Qiqan ===
The early Muslim historians, al-Baladhuri, Ibn Sa'd and Khalifa ibn Khayyat, note the first raid to Qiqan to have taken place in 658 CE. Kaikan, also known as al-Qiqan, was located near Quetta (probably modern Kalat, Pakistan), where al-Abdi and Sayfi ibn Fil al-Shaybani had participated in this first raid.

Harith was also entrusted with investigating significant matters of the state. For instance, during the reign of Ali ibn Abi Talib, he was sent by him to investigate the murders of Khabbab ibn al-Aratt and his pregnant bondmaid. Harith was killed in 662 during a campaign to Qiqan.

== See also ==
- Abdallah ibn Sawwar al-Abdi
- Ali's Eastern Campaigns
