= Zamuri hills =

Pakistani mountain range

The Zamuri hills are a mountain range located in the Kalat District of Balochistan, Pakistan.
