= Talár (newspaper) =

Pakistani Newspaper

Talar
- Type: Daily & Weekly newspaper
- Format: Broadsheet
- Founder(s): Abdul Raziq Ababaki
- Founded: 2004
- Headquarters: Quetta, Pakistan
- Website: talarbrahui.com

Talar (Brahui: تلار) also known as Weekly Talar Quetta and Daily Talar Noshki is a Pakistani newspaper written in the Brahui language with both daily and weekly editions. The newspaper is founded by Abdul Raziq Ababaki. The weekly edition entered publication in January 2004 to promote the Brahui language, literature and culture. Published every Saturday, the Weekly Talar is based on twelve pages and is the most circulated periodical in Brahui.

The four-page Daily Talar, the first ever daily newspaper in Brahui, is an attempt to standardize and develop the language in order to meet the requirements of modern political, social and scientific discourse. The daily edition entered publication in July 2005.
