= Nagau =

Mountain range in Pakistan

Coordinates: 29°16′30″N 67°17′55″E

Nagau is a mountain range located in the Kalat District of Balochistan, Pakistan. It is located at 29°16'30N 67°17'55E.
