= Spezand =

Pakistani town

Coordinates: 29°59′0″N 67°0′0″E

Spezand is a town and Union Council of Mastung District in the Balochistan province of Pakistan. It is located at 29°58'60N 67°0'0E and has an altitude of 1795 metres (5892 feet).

== Transport ==
Spezand is the junction where the railway to Zahedan branches off the railway to Quetta.

== See also ==
- Railway stations in Pakistan
