= ڷ =

Letter found in Arabic script

ڷ is an additional letter of the Arabic script, derived from lām (ل) with an additional three dots above the letter. Though not used in the Arabic alphabet itself, it is used in the Brahui, Sawi, and Dhatki. In Brahui, it is to represent a voiceless lateral fricative [ɬ]. In Sawi, 'ڷ' represents the voiced palatal lateral approximant [ʎ] as well as the voiceless lateral fricative [ɬ]. In Dhatki, it represents the voiced retroflex lateral approximant [ɭ] similar to Kalasha's لؕ and also represents the voiced retroflex lateral flap [𝼈].

== Forms ==
Position in word:	Isolated	Final	Medial	Initial
Glyph form: (Help)	ڷ	ـڷ	ـڷـ	ڷـ
