= Sorgaz =

Pakistani town

Coordinates: 27°44′0″N 66°41′50″E

Sorgaz is a town and Union Council of Mastung District in the Balochistan province of Pakistan. The town is located at 27°43'60N 66°41'50E at an altitude of 1,148 metres (3,769 feet).
