= Sarawan =

Former division of Baluchistan, Pakistan

Coordinates: 29°48′33″N 66°51′24″E

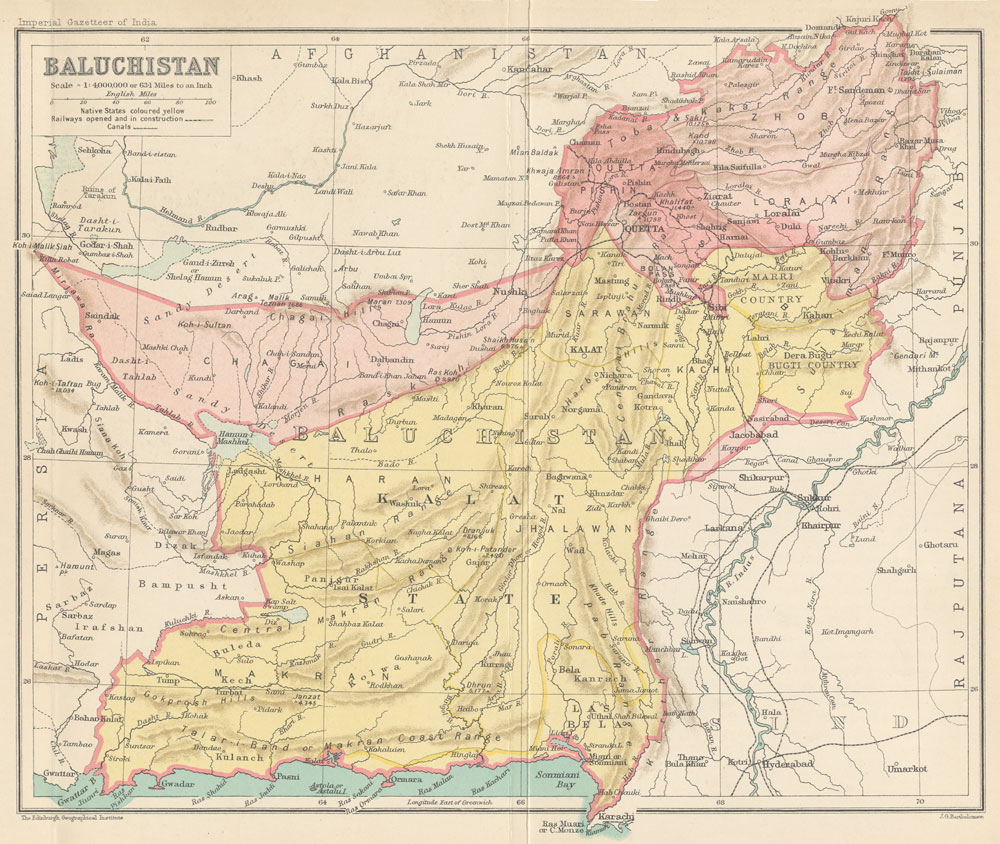
Map of the Baluchistan Agency.

Sarawan (Balochi: سراوان) was a division of the former princely state of Kalat in Baluchistan, Pakistan, with an area 4,339 square miles (11,240 km^{2}). To the north were Quetta, Pishin, Bolan Pass and Sibi District. On the south was the division of Jhalawan. The main mountain ranges are Nagau, Bhaur, Zamuri hills, Bangulzai hills with the peaks of Moro, Dilband and Harboi.

== History ==
Sarawan tribal area was ruled by many empires including the Ghaznavid Empire and Ghorid empires, until the end of the 15th century. In 1666, Mir Aḥmad Khan Qambrani was ruler of Khanate of Kalat. In 1758, Muhammad Nasir Khan I came to power. Nasir Khan II was brought on throne by Sarawan tribesmen in the 1840.

== Demographics ==
Religious groups in the Sarawan Division of Kalat State (British Baluchistan era)
Religious group	1911		1921		1931		1941	
Religious group	Pop.	%	Pop.	%	Pop.	%	Pop.	%
Islam	62,660	98.24%	53,304	98.23%	27,722	97.39%	27,592	97.6%
Hinduism	1,003	1.57%	896	1.65%	729	2.56%	592	2.09%
Sikhism	113	0.18%	60	0.11%	10	0.04%	61	0.22%
Christianity	5	0.01%	2	0%	3	0.01%	25	0.09%
Zoroastrianism	0	0%	0	0%	0	0%	0	0%
Judaism	0	0%	0	0%	0	0%	0	0%
Jainism	0	0%	0	0%	0	0%	0	0%
Buddhism	0	0%	0	0%	0	0%	0	0%
Tribal	—N/a	—N/a	—N/a	—N/a	0	0%	0	0%
Others	0	0%	0	0%	0	0%	0	0%
Total population	63,781	100%	54,262	100%	28,464	100%	28,270	100%

== See also ==
- Baluchistan Agency
