= Dilband =

Mountain range in Balochistan, Pakistan

Coordinates: 29°29′40″N 67°10′45″E

Dilband is a mountain range located in the Kalat District of Balochistan, Pakistan. It is located at 29°29'40N 67°10'45E and is an important source of iron ore and has reserves of 165 million tons.
