= Ali's Eastern Campaigns =

Series of expeditions across the Indus Valley during the Caliphate of Ali

- Part of Arab conquest of Sindh and Sistan
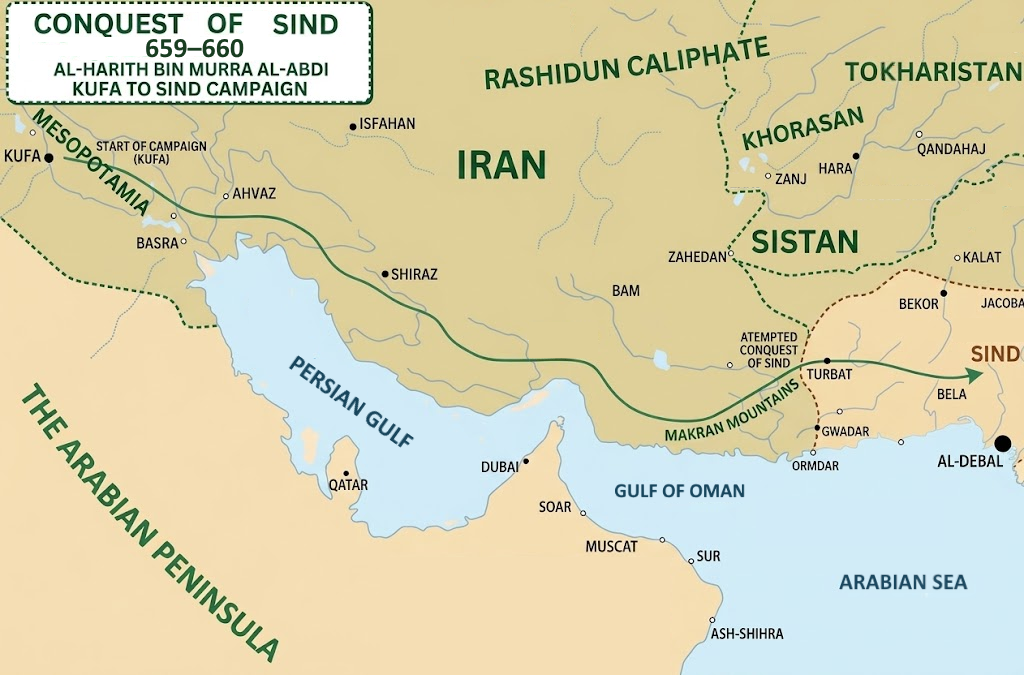
- Route of Al-Harith ibn Murra al-Abdi during the Sindh Campaign
Date	658–661
Location	Iran , Afghanistan , Sindh of Pakistan
Result	Victory for Ali
Territorial changes	Bolan, Qayqan and Balochistan conquered by Ali's forces

Belligerents
Rashidun Caliphate	Hephthalites; Sindhi Kingdom of Qiqan

Commanders and leaders
Ali ibn Abi Talib; Al-Harith ibn Murra al-Abdi; Tāgir ibn Du'r; Ja'dah b. Hubayrah; Ziyad ibn Abihi	Qiqan Shah; Nezak Tarkhan Other unknown leaders

Strength
5,000+	20,000

Casualties and losses
Unknown	unknown

Ali's Eastern Campaigns were a series of military expeditions and raids conducted between 658 and 661 CE by the fourth Rashidun caliph Ali. Amidst the disruptions of the First Fitna, various eastern provinces rose in revolt or fell under the influence of Sasanian and Hephthalite forces. Ali dispatched several contingents to re-establish Rashidun authority across Sistan, Balochistan, and the Indus Valley. These expeditions resulted in the recapture of Zaranj, the suppression of regional revolts, and the first significant Muslim incursions into the Qayqan region.

== Background ==
During the reign of the third Rashidun caliph Uthman, the governor of Sistan Abd al-Rahman ibn Samura led an army to suppress revolts in southern Afghanistan. His forces captured Zaranj and moved through the Hindu Kush to take Kabul and Ghazni. Another column moved into northeastern Balochistan and secured the area around the Bolan Pass. By 654, almost all of Balochistan was under Rashidun control with the exception of the Qayqan region. Following the assassination of Uthman and the outbreak of the First Fitna in 656, the eastern frontier experienced widespread instability. Abd al-Rahman ibn Samura left his post as governor in 656 and many of the conquered regions in Sistan and the Indus Valley revolted against central authority.

To address this collapse of control, Caliph Ali utilized commanders with prior experience in the eastern regions. Hukaym ibn Jabala al-Abdi had previously scouted Makran in 649 to report on the geography and local tribal dynamics, including the Jats of the Indus delta. In 658, Al-Harith ibn Murra al-Abdi and Sayfi ibn Fusil al-Shaybani were commissioned to lead an advance into Sindh. Their immediate objectives were to suppress banditry and re-establish a military presence in the territories that had shifted toward local Sasanian and Hephthalite influence during the civil war.

== Expeditions ==
=== Expedition to Sindh and the Bolan Pass ===
During Ali's caliphate, a multi-pronged offensive was launched toward the Indus Valley. Al-Harith ibn Murra al-Abdi volunteered for the Sindh campaign after receiving authorization from Ali. He successfully raided the outskirts of Sindh, taking captives and securing significant spoils. Historical records indicate that two primary land expeditions took place during this period: one led by Tagir ibn Du'r in 659 and another by Al-Harith in 660. This campaign was supported by a strategic advance into the region of Qayqan, situated along the Bolan Pass. While Muslim forces initially moved through the pass without resistance, they engaged local defenders in 658 near modern-day Kalat. The Rashidun forces emerged victorious, reportedly inflicting 1,000 casualties in a single day. Although al-Harith achieved initial success, he was killed four years later while conducting further raids during the reign of the first Umayyad caliph Mu'awiya.

=== Conflict with the Jats and Medes ===
According to the Chach Nama, Qayqan was under the direct administrative control of the Chach Rai and inhabited by the Jats and the Medes. While these groups mounted a fierce resistance that caused initial setbacks for the Arab forces, the chronicle notes that the defenders were eventually overpowered as the conflict progressed.

=== Naval raids and coastal incursions ===
Complementing these land operations, the Arab navy conducted maritime raids against the ports of Thane, Bharuch, and Debal, projecting authority over the coastal regions of the Indian subcontinent.

=== Campaigns in Sistan the Hephthalite borders ===
After recapturing the provincial capital of Zaranj, Ali's governors utilized the city as a strategic base for large-scale raids into the dominions of the Hephthalites between 658 and 659. And Ali, who sent out Khulayd b. Qurrah al-Yarbu-ī ,who besieged the people of Naysabür until they made peace with him, and so too those of Marw. These expeditions served to secure the far-eastern Iranian highlands and re-assert the Caliphate's authority during the disruptions of the First Fitna.
