= Afghan units of measurement =

System of units of measurement historically used in Afghanistan

A variety of units of measurement have been used in Afghanistan to measure length, mass and capacity. Those units were similar to Iranian, Arabian and Indian units. In 1924, Afghanistan adopted the metric system.

== Length ==
These lengths are not necessarily standardized and could differ between different regions of Afghanistan:

- 1 gaz-i-shah (Kabul yard) = 1.065 meters (m)
- 1 girah-i gaz-i-shah = 0.066 m
- 1 gaz-i-mimar (mason's yard) = 0.838 m
- 1 gaz-i-jareeb (for land) = 0.736 m
- 1 jareeb (one side) = 44.183 m
- 1 biswah (one side) = 9.879 m
- 1 biswasah (one side) = 2.209 m
- 1 jareeb (land measurement) = 2,000 m^{2} (standardized)
- 1 goes = 1.16 m (45.67 in)

== Weights ==
- 1 nakhud = 0.19 gram (g)
- 1 misqal = 24 nakhuds = 4.4 g
- 1 khurd = 110.4 g
- 1 pao = 441.6 g
- 1 charak = 1766.4 g = 1.77 kilogram (kg)
- 1 seer = 30 miskals = 7066.0 g = 7.07 kg
- 1 man = 40 seers = 4.5 or more kg
- 1 kharwar = 80 sers = 100 mans = 565,280.0 g = 565.28 kg
- 1 puri = just under 1 kg
- 1 khaltar = approximately 7 kg

== Localized differences ==
British sources from the late 19th and early 20th century described some Afghanese weights as follows:

- 1 Herati seer = 8 tolas = 1/10 British (Indian) seer
- 1 Herati man = 40 seers = 4 seers British
- 1 Herati kharwar = 100 mans = 10 maunds British
- 1 Mazar seer = 1 1/2 Kabuli seers (11 1/4) British seers
- 1 Mazar man = 16 Mazar seers = 4 maunds 20 seers British
- 1 Mazar kharwar = 3 Mazar mans = 13 maunds
- 1 kadam or gaz-i-shari (Turkestan) = 28 inches (pace) = 16 tasa
- 1 farsakh (Herat) or 1 sang (Turkestan) = 12,000 kadam = 5 miles
- 1 grain per kulba (southern Afghanistan) = 50 Kandahari kharwars
- 1 Tashkurghan seer = 9 British seers
- 1 Taskhurghan man = 8 seers = 1 maund 32 seers British
- 1 Kandahari yard = 41 1/2 inches British
- 1 tanab (Kandahar) = 85 acres British

== See also ==
- Persian units of measurement
- Arab units of measurement
- Indian units of measurement
