= Mastung Valley =

Mastung Valley (Urdu: وادی مستونگ) is located in Mastung District, Balochistan, Pakistan. It is a popular tourist destination in Pakistan.

== See also ==
- Mastung, Pakistan (town)
- Khwaja Ibrahim Yukpasi
