= Kalat, Balochistan =

Pakistani town

Kalat قلات Qalat
- Town
- Location of Kalat Kalat (Pakistan)
- Coordinates: 29.030°N 66.589°E
- Country: Pakistan
- Province: Balochistan
- District: Kalat

Government
  - Type: Municipal Committee
  - Chairman: Vacant
  - Vice-Chairman: Vacant

Area
  - Town: 489 km^{2} (189 sq mi)
- Elevation: 2,007 m (6,585 ft)

Population (2023)
  - Town: 44,440
- Time zone: UTC+5 (PST)
- Area code: +92844

Kalāt or Qalāt (Brahui, Balochi and Urdu: کلات, romanized: Kalāt, Balochi: [kɐlaːt̪]), historically known as Qīqān or Kaikan, is a city in the Pakistani province of Balochistan. It was the historical capital of the Khanate of Kalat from the 17th to the mid-20th centuries. Situated within the Central Brahui Range, today the town is the headquarters of the Kalat District and the Kalat Division.

== Name ==
The city of Kalat or Qalat, from Arabic Qal'a, meaning 'fortress', was originally known as Kalat-e Sewa, after the pre-Islamic Hindu monarch who ruled the region, later being called Kalat-e Baloch as Baloch tribes migrated into the region in the 15th century, to distinguish it from Kalāt-e Ghilzai in Afghanistan, and Kalat-e Sewa, after its legendary founder.

== History ==
According to the Encyclopaedia of Islam:

It has been known in earlier times as Kalāt-i-Sēva (from a legendary Hindu king) and Kalāt-i-Ničārī which connects it with the Brahōī tribe of Ničārī, which is generally accepted as belonging to the oldest branch of the indigenous Brahōīs.

As per the local folklore, the town of Kalat was founded by the Hindu Sewa dynasty (Qalat-e Sewa) before the Brahui rule in the 15th century.

The region was inhabited by the Jat tribes at the time of early Muslim conquests in the 7th century, known in Arabic as al-Zuṭṭ. The Jats of Qayqan (Kalat) fought against the Arab troops near Bolan Pass, killing the Arab commander al-Harith ibn Murra al-Abdi in 662 CE; this version is also preserved in the Chachnama. The Umayyad campaigns in Qiqan would continue for several decades.

In the 15th century, Kalat was conquered by the Brahui people under Mirwari clan from the Hindu Sewa dynasty, from where they soon established a large kingdom. The Brahui Khans of Kalat were dominant from the 17th century onwards until the arrival of the British in the 19th century. A treaty was signed in 1876 to make Kalat part of the British Empire. In 1948, the last Khan of Kalat acceded to the dominion of Pakistan. He was formally removed from power in 1955, but the title is still claimed by his descendants. The current Khan of Qalat is Mir Suleman Dawood Jan.

== Climate ==
Kalat features a cold desert climate (BWk) under the Köppen climate classification. The average temperature in Kalat is 14.1 °C (57.4 °F), while the annual precipitation averages 163 mm (6.4 in). June is the driest month with 1 mm (0.039 in) of rainfall, while January, the wettest month, has an average precipitation of 36 mm (1.4 in).

July is the warmest month of the year with an average temperature of 24.8 °C (76.6 °F). The coldest month January has an average temperature of 3.4 °C (38.1 °F). The all-time lowest recorded temperature in Kalat was −17 °C (1 °F) on 20 January 1978, while the highest temperature ever recorded was 38 °C (100 °F) on 19 June 1977.

Climate data for Kalat
| Month | Jan | Feb | Mar | Apr | May | Jun | Jul | Aug | Sep | Oct | Nov | Dec | Year |
|---|---|---|---|---|---|---|---|---|---|---|---|---|---|
| Mean daily maximum °C (°F) | 10.3 (50.5) | 12.1 (53.8) | 17.1 (62.8) | 22.1 (71.8) | 27.4 (81.3) | 31.9 (89.4) | 32.6 (90.7) | 31.7 (89.1) | 28.6 (83.5) | 23.3 (73.9) | 17.5 (63.5) | 13.1 (55.6) | 22.3 (72.2) |
| Daily mean °C (°F) | 3.4 (38.1) | 5.3 (41.5) | 9.8 (49.6) | 14.3 (57.7) | 18.9 (66.0) | 22.7 (72.9) | 24.8 (76.6) | 23.4 (74.1) | 19.4 (66.9) | 13.8 (56.8) | 8.6 (47.5) | 4.9 (40.8) | 14.1 (57.4) |
| Mean daily minimum °C (°F) | −3.5 (25.7) | −1.5 (29.3) | 2.6 (36.7) | 6.6 (43.9) | 10.5 (50.9) | 13.5 (56.3) | 17.0 (62.6) | 15.2 (59.4) | 10.3 (50.5) | 4.3 (39.7) | −0.2 (31.6) | −3.3 (26.1) | 6.0 (42.7) |
Source: Climate-Data.org

== Demographics ==
=== Population ===
Historical population
| Year | Pop. | ±% p.a. |
|---|---|---|
| 1951 | 2,009 | — |
| 1961 | 5,321 | +10.23% |
| 1972 | 6,481 | +1.81% |
| 1981 | 11,037 | +6.09% |
| 1998 | 22,646 | +4.32% |
| 2017 | 36,864 | +2.60% |
| 2023 | 44,440 | +3.16% |

As of the 2023 census, Kalat has population of 44,440.

Languages

Languages of Kalat (2023 Census)
1. Brahui (83.9%)
2. Balochi (12.9%)
3. Pashto (0.44%)
4. Urdu (0.35%)
5. Others (2.39%)

The population is mostly Muslim (97 percent), with a Hindu population of three percent, out of which many are Hindkowan merchants who regard Kalat as their homeland.

"The Hindus of Kalat town — undoubtedly among the oldest in the community — claim to be offshoots of the mysterious Sewa dynasty that ruled in Kalat centuries before the Brahui Confederacy took shape. But though the Bhatia of Las Bela punctiliously refer their advent to the year 708 A.D., and the Hindus of Lahri tell in all good faith of their journeyings from Aleppo with Chakar the Rind, the early history of these old Hindu families is hopelessly befogged. Everything, however, seems to point to the western Panjab and Sind as the countries from which most of them came, though isolated families in Nushki may have immigrated by way of Afghanistan, and a few others may have wandered in from the far corners of India. Originally they may have been as diverse as the villages from which they came and the dates of their coming. Today the old Hindu families form a more or less homogeneous community. In particular customs no doubt they vary considerably; but common environment has set its common mark on them all. And it is in the effect of an alien environment on Hindus and Hindu caste that the main interest in these old trading families of Baluchistan is centred."

— Excerpt from the Census of India, 1911 AD

=== Religion ===
Religious groups in Kalat City (1941 & 2017)
| Religious group | 1941 | | 2017 | |
| Religious group | Pop. | % | Pop. | % |
|---|---|---|---|---|
| Islam | 2,049 | 83.19% | 35,547 | 96.61% |
| Hinduism | 381 | 15.47% | 1,234 | 3.35% |
| Sikhism | 33 | 1.34% | —N/a | —N/a |
| Christianity | 0 | 0% | 13 | 0.04% |
| Ahmadiyya | —N/a | —N/a | 2 | 0.01% |
| Total population | 2,463 | 100% | 36,796 | 100% |

==== Kalat Kali Temple ====
Kalat Kali Temple is a Hindu temple devoted to Kali. The Kali Temple of Kalat is located at the foot of the ancient city fort of Kalat state. This temple was built before the arrival of Islam in South Asia.

== See also ==
- Gandava
- Khuzdar
