= Central Brahui Range =

Sulaiman sub-range in Pakistan

Coordinates: 30°07′N 67°48′E

Highest point
- Elevation: 3,578 m (11,739 ft)

Geography
- Location: Pakistan

Central Brahui Range (Urdu: وسطی براہوئی پہاڑی سلسلہ) is a mountain range located in the east of Quetta District, in Balochistan province of western Pakistan. The range, which is part of the Sulaiman Range, contains the tallest mountain peak in Balochistan, Zarghun Ghar (3578 m). The range is home to a broad swathe of flora and fauna. The important passes through the range include Bolan Pass and Harnai Pass. Near Quetta it meets the Suleiman Range and Toba Kakar Range.

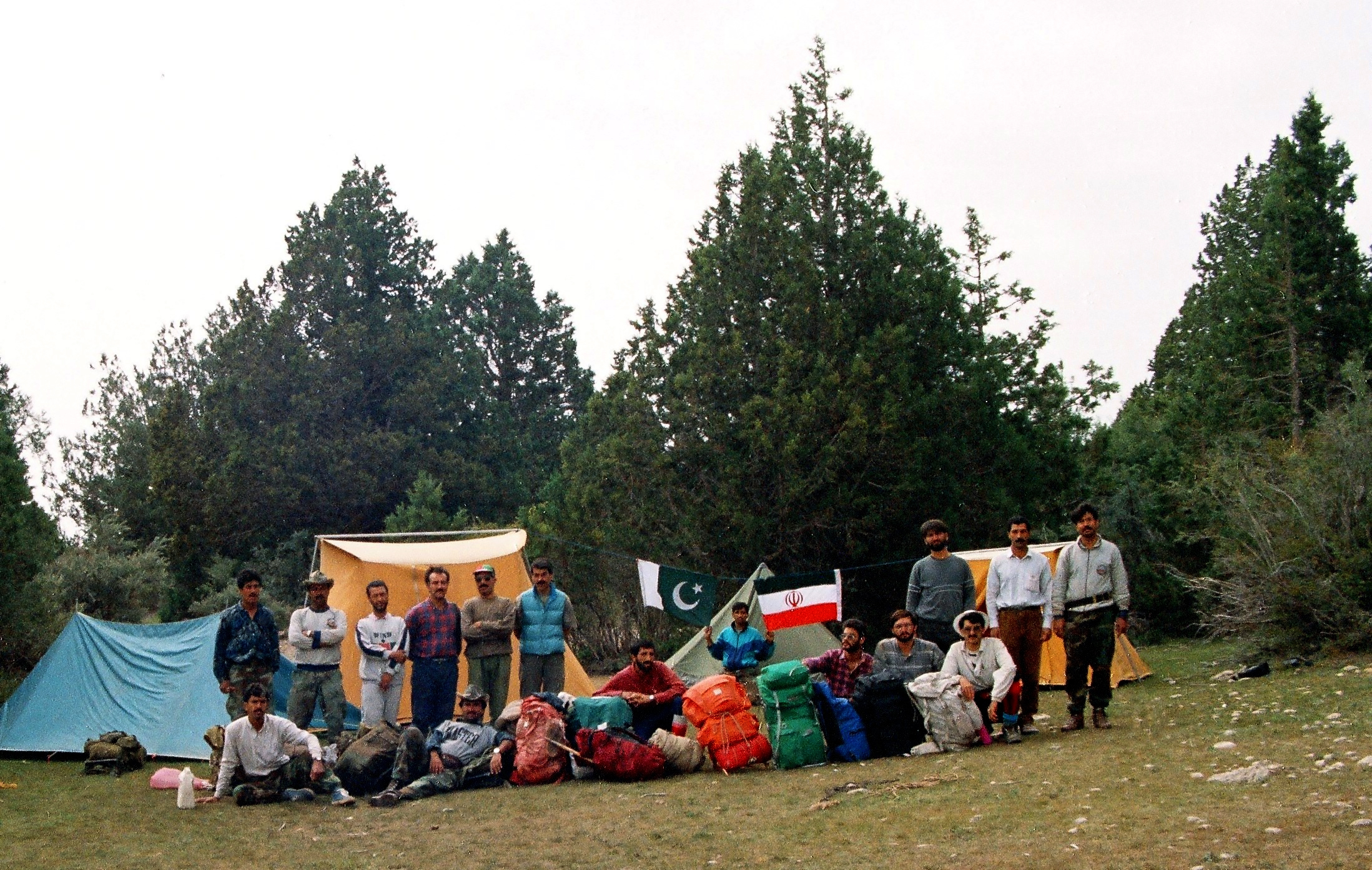
Pak-Iran Juniper Defenders and Mountaineers headed by Hayatullah Khan Durrani at base camp of Zarghoon Mount Balochistan, 1991.

== Peaks ==
The Central Brahui Range's highest peak is Zarghun Ghar, at 3,578 meters (11738. ft), which is also considered the highest mountain peak in Balochistan, while the second highest peak is Kuchnai Saar, at 3,404 meters (11,170. ft).

== Flora ==
The base of the Zarghoon Ghar up to the city of Ziarat is densely covered by Pashtun juniper (Juniperus seravschanica) trees, a forest of about 200,000 acres (810 km^{2}). The Pashtun Juniper forest in the adjacent Ziarat District covers an area of about 247,000 acres (1,000 km^{2}).

== See also ==
- List of mountains in Pakistan
- Mountain ranges of Pakistan
