= Mastung District =

District in Balochistan, Pakistan

Mastung District ضلع مستونگ مستونگ دمگ
- District of Balochistan
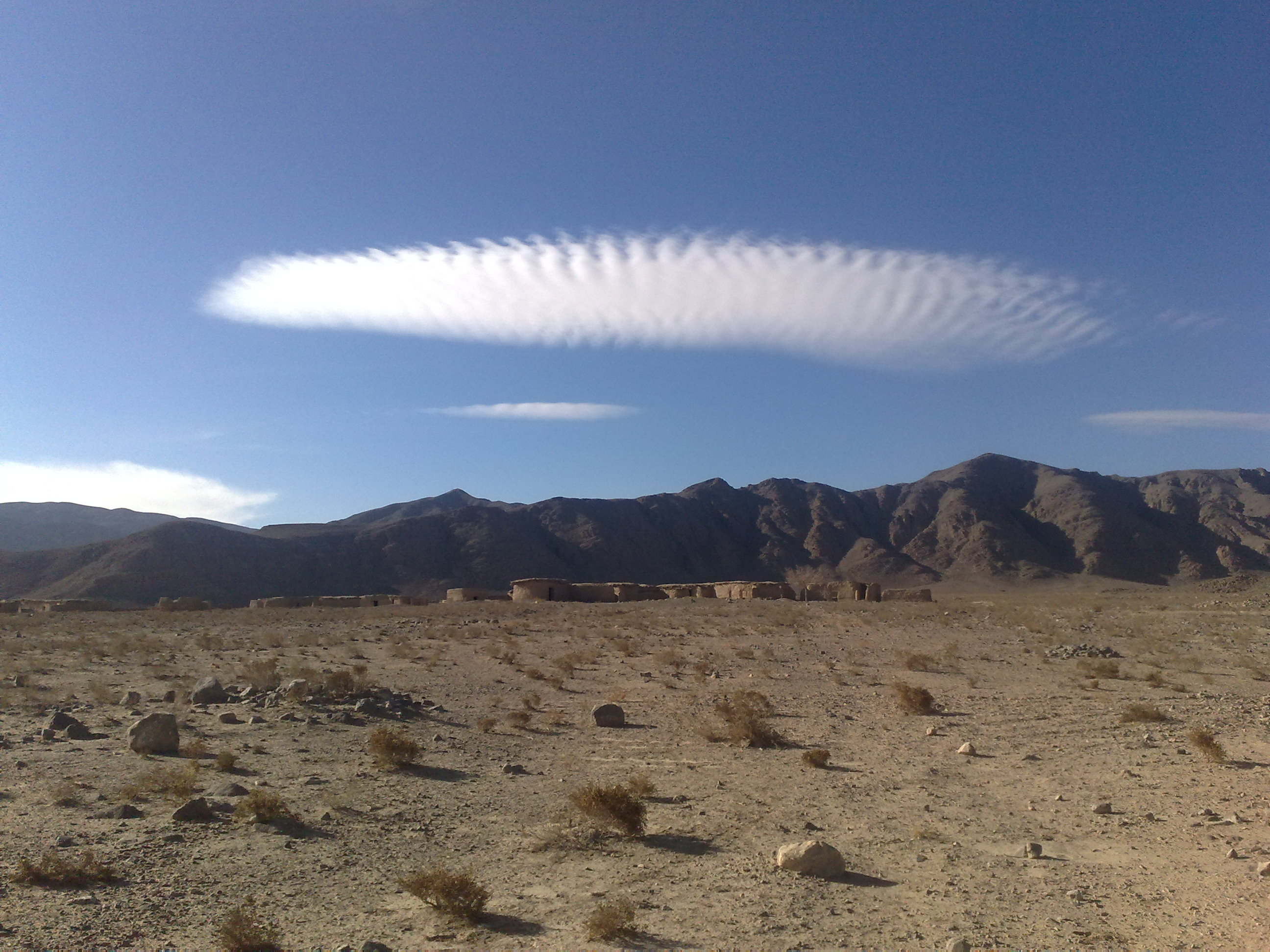
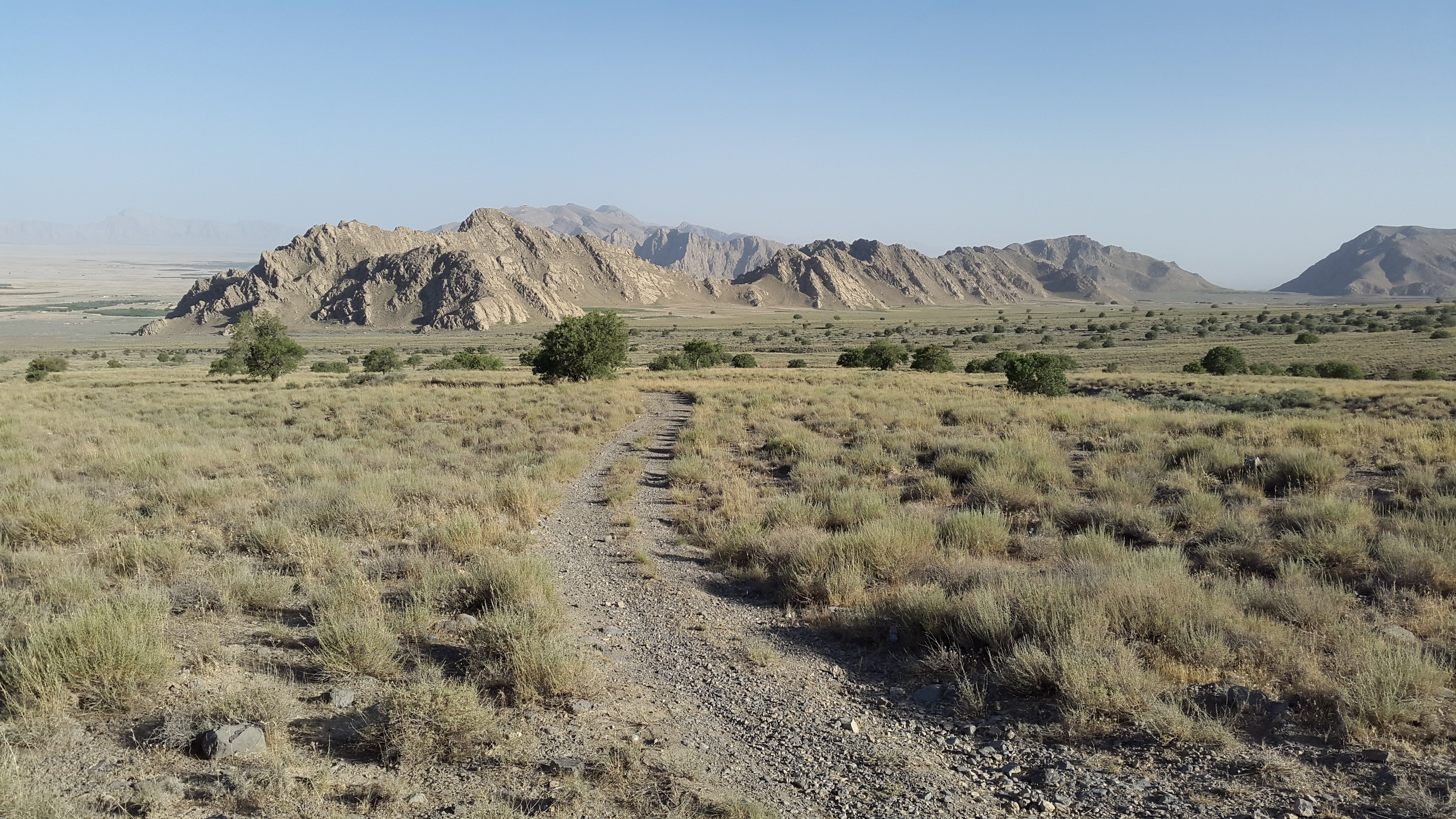
- Top: Mountains near Dasht; Bottom: Koh-i-Chiltan

- Map of Balochistan with Mastung District highlighted
- Coordinates: 29.80°N 66.85°E
- Country: Pakistan
- Province: Balochistan
- Division: Quetta
- Established: 1991
- Headquarters: Mastung
- Administrative Areas: 04: Dasht Subdivision Khad Kocha Sub Tehsil Kardgab Subdivision Mastung Subdivision

Government
  - Type: District Administration
  - Deputy Commissioner: Captain (R) Mir Baz Khan Marri
  - Constituensy: NA-261 Surab-cum-Kalat-cum-Mastung

Area
  - District of Balochistan: 5,896 km^{2} (2,276 sq mi)
- Elevation: 1,701 m (5,581 ft)

Population (2023 Pakistani census)
  - District of Balochistan: 313,271
  - Density: 53.13/km^{2} (137.6/sq mi)
  - Urban: 40,374 (12.89%)
  - Rural: 272,897 (87.11%)

Literacy
  - Literacy rate: Total: (45.97%); Male: (57.26%); Female: (33.27%)
- Time zone: UTC+05:00 (PKT)
  - Summer (DST): DST is not observed
- ZIP Code: 88200
- NWD (area) code: 843
- ISO 3166 code: PK-BA

Mastung District (Note: Balochi: مستونگ دمگ; Brahui and Urdu: ضلع مستونگ) is located in the northwest of Balochistan (Pakistan), covering an area of 3,308 km². It lies south of Quetta District, with elevations between 5,600 feet (1,700 m) to 10,000 feet (3,000 m) above sea level.

The Hazarganji-Chiltan National Park, one of Balochistan's protected areas, is situated between Quetta and Mastung, about 20 kilometres (12 mi) southwest of Quetta city.

Formerly a sub-division of Kalat District, Mastung was granted district status in July 1991 and has functioned independently since 18 February 1992. Its name is traditionally derived from the Brahui words Mas (mountain) and Tung (hole).

The district is prone to natural hazards, including earthquakes, floods, and droughts. Its varied landscapes encompass the high Sulaiman Mountains, desert, and forest habitats, and support a rich diversity of flora. Medicinal plants remain an important part of rural healthcare, while agriculture is the primary source of livelihood for nearly half the population, with major crops including wheat, barley, cumin, fodder, melon, potato, and other vegetables.

== Administration ==
The district consists of following Tehsils:

Tehsil	Area (km²)	Pop. (2023)	Density (ppl/km²) (2023)	Literacy rate (2023)	Union Councils
Dasht Tehsil	1,047	67,935	64.89	36.79%	
Mastung Tehsil	692	162,319	234.57	53.70%	
Khad Koocha Tehsil	640	46,316	72.37	33.22%	
Kirdgap Tehsil	929	36,701	39.51	42.71%	

Prior to 2006, the three tehsils contained 12 union councils: Khadkoocha, Ghulam Parenz, Karez Noth, Mastung-1, Mastung-2, Sorgaz, Tehsil Dasht, Isplinji, Kanak, Shaikh Wasil, Kardigap and Soro. In 2006, one additional union council formed with the name of Alizai, making the total union councils to 13.

== Demographics ==
=== Population ===
Historical population
Year	Pop.	±% p.a.
1951	...	—
1961	33,718	—
1972	74,690	+7.50%
1981	130,207	+6.37%
1998	150,039	+0.84%
2017	265,676	+3.05%
2023	313,271	+2.78%

As of the 2023 census, Mastung district has 43,695 households and a population of 313,271. The district has a sex ratio of 113.70 males to 100 females and a literacy rate of 45.97%: 57.26% for males and 33.27% for females. 109,539 (35.07% of the surveyed population) are under 10 years of age. 40,374 (12.89%) live in urban areas. 1,696 (0.54% of the surveyed population) was from religious minorities, of which 900 were Hindus and 750 Christians.

=== Language ===
Languages of Mastung district (2023)
1. Brahui (89.0%)
2. Balochi (7.19%)
3. Pashto (2.12%)
4. Others (1.64%)

At the time of the 2023 census, 89.05% of the population spoke Brahui, 7.19% Balochi and 2.12% Pashto as their first language.

== Education ==
According to the Pakistan District Education Rankings 2017, district Mastung is ranked at number 74 out of the 141 ranked districts in Pakistan on the education score index. This index considers learning, gender parity and retention in the district.

Literacy rate for 2014–15 of population 10 years and older in the district stands at 59% whereas for females it is only 38%.

Post primary access is a major issue in the district with 79% schools being at primary level. Compare this with high schools which constitute only 8% of government schools in the district. This is also reflected in the enrolment figures for 2016–17 with 15,842 students enrolled in class 1 to 5 and only 642 students enrolled in class 9 and 10.

Gender disparity is another issue in the district. Only 36% schools in the district are girls’ schools. Access to education for girls is a major issue in the district and is also reflected in the low literacy rates for females.

Moreover, the schools in the district lack basic facilities. According to Alif Ailaan district education rankings 2017, the district is ranked at number 107 out of the 155 districts of Pakistan for primary school infrastructure. At the middle school level, it is ranked at number 115 out of the 155 districts. These rankings take into account the basic facilities available in schools including drinking water, working toilet, availability of electricity, existence of a boundary wall and general building condition. 4 out of 5 schools do not have electricity in them. More than half the schools lack a toilet and 1 out 3 schools do not have a boundary wall. 3 out of 5 schools do not have clean drinking water.

== Natural Resources ==
Mastung District's primary natural resource is marble, extracted by numerous small and medium-sized enterprises. The area also contains deposits of iron ore and fluorite. Fluorite is found within the Chiltan Limestone formation in small veins, irregular pods, pockets, and along bedding planes. The district's ironstone bed, once thought to be a bauxite deposit, has been confirmed by the Geological Survey of Pakistan to hold economically significant iron ore, chiefly composed of hematite, with quartz, calcite, and chlorite as associated minerals. In the Dilband area of Mastung, ironstone beds ranging from 1 to 7 metres in thickness have been identified, with reserves tentatively estimated at over 200 million tonnes.

== See also ==
- 2017 Mastung suicide bombing
- Mastung Valley
- Dehwar Tribe
- Shahwani Tribe
- Bangulzai Tribe
- Raisani Tribe
- Sarparah Tribe
- Kurd Tribe
