= Kalat District =

District in Balochistan, Pakistan

Coordinates: 29.0257°N 66.5893°E

Kalat District قلات
- District of Balochistan
- Map of Balochistan with Kalat District highlighted in maroon
- Country: Pakistan
- Province: Balochistan
- Division: Khuzdar
- Established: March 1954
- Headquarters: Kalat

Government
  - Type: District Administration
  - Deputy Commissioner: Jameel Ahmed Baloch
  - District Police Officer: N/A
  - District Health Officer: N/A

Area
  - District of Balochistan: 7,654 km^{2} (2,955 sq mi)

Population (2023)
  - District of Balochistan: 272,506
  - Density: 35.6/km^{2} (92/sq mi)
  - Urban: 44,440 (16.30%)
  - Rural: 227,120 (83.70%)

Literacy
  - Literacy rate: Total: (39.70%); Male: (49.54%); Female: (29.41%)
- Time zone: UTC+5 (PST)
- Number of Tehsils: 2

Kalat District (Brahui and Urdu: قلات) is a district located in Balochistan province of Pakistan. Kalat was made a separate district on 3 February 1954. At that time Khuzdar and Mastung districts were sub-divisions of Kalat (which then also included Kachi, Jhal Magsi and Naseerabad (Dera Murad Jamali); these were separated in 1965 as Kachhi District). Khuzdar became a separate district by notification of 1 March 1974, while Mastung was announced as a separate district on 18 February 1992. The district draws its name from the ancient city of Kalat. The old name of the district headquarters was Kahan. The current district consists of two sub-divisions, i.e. Kalat and Manguchar, four tehsils: Kalat, Mangochar, Johan, and Gazgz, 81 Patwar circles and 614 mauza (villages).

The climate is arid, hot in summer and cold in winter, with most rainfall occurring in the winter. The terrain is mountainous with several valleys and one main river. The Khan of Kalat is a ceremonial title held by Mir Suleman Dawood Jan, and efforts have been made by the Pakistani government to reconcile with him; his son Mohammed, who is next in line to be the Khan of Kalat, is pro-Pakistan.

== Administration ==
The district is administratively subdivided into the following tehsils:

Tehsil	Area (km²)	Pop. (2023)	Density (ppl/km²) (2023)	Literacy rate (2023)	Union Councils
Kalat Tehsil	3,788	167,405	44.19	44.19%	
Mangochar Tehsil	1,148	80,138	69.81	35.22%	
Gazg Tehsil	1,390	8,286	5.96	18.75%	
Johan Tehsil	1,328	15,731	11.85	27.49%	

== Demographics ==
Historical population
Year	Pop.	±% p.a.
1951	N/A	—
1961	N/A	—
1972	N/A	—
1981	N/A	—
1998	144,433	—
2017	211,201	+2.02%
2023	271,560	+4.28%

=== Population ===
As of the 2023 census, Kalat district has 33,101 households and a population of 271,560. The district has a sex ratio of 104.26 males to 100 females and a literacy rate of 39.70%: 49.54% for males and 29.41% for females. 100,643 (37.06% of the surveyed population) are under 10 years of age. 44,440 (16.36%) live in urban areas.

=== Religion ===
In the 2023 census, Islam was the predominant religion with 99.25% while Hindus were 0.39% of the population and Christians were 0.31% of the population.

The district has a historical Hindu community dating back to the Sewa dynasty. The Kalat Kali temple is the major temple in the district, which is visited by Hindus from all parts of Pakistan and also from India.

=== Language ===
Languages of Kalat district (2023)
1. Brahui (73.2%)
2. Balochi (25.5%)
3. Pashto (0.67%)
4. Others (0.59%)

At the time of the 2023 census, 73.22% of the population spoke Brahui, 25.52% Balochi and 0.67% Pashto as their first language.

== Education ==
According to the Pakistan District Education Rankings 2017, district Kalat is ranked at number 66 out of the 141 ranked districts in Pakistan on the education score index. This index considers learning, gender parity and retention in the district.

Literacy rate in 2014–15 of population 10 years and older in the district stood at 54% whereas for females it was only 45%.

Post primary access is a major issue in the district with 83% schools being at primary level. In comparison with high schools which constitute only 9% of government schools in the district. This is also reflected in the enrollment figures for 2016–17 with 20,031 students enrolled in class 1 to 5 and only 658 students enrolled in class 9 and 10.

Gender disparity is another issue in the district. Only 34% schools in the district are girls schools. Access to education for girls is a major issue in the district and is also reflected in the low literacy rates for females.

Moreover, the schools in the district lack basic facilities. According to Alif Ailaan Pakistan District Education Rankings 2017, the district is ranked at number 128 out of the 155 districts of Pakistan for primary school infrastructure. At the middle school level, it is ranked at number 136 out of the 155 districts. These rankings take into account the basic facilities available in schools including drinking water, working toilet, availability of electricity, existence of a boundary wall and general building condition. 4 out of 5 schools were reported to have no electricity in them. Approximately 1 out of 2 schools lacked toilet and a boundary wall. More than 1 out of 3 schools did not have clean drinking water.

== See also ==
- Kalat (princely state)
- Districts of Pakistan
  - Districts of Balochistan
  - Districts of Khyber Pakhtunkhwa
  - Districts of Sindh, Pakistan
  - Districts of Punjab, Pakistan
  - Districts of Azad Kashmir
  - Districts of Gilgit-Baltistan
