= Brahvi language =

Dravidian language spoken in Pakistan

Brahvi
- براہوئی
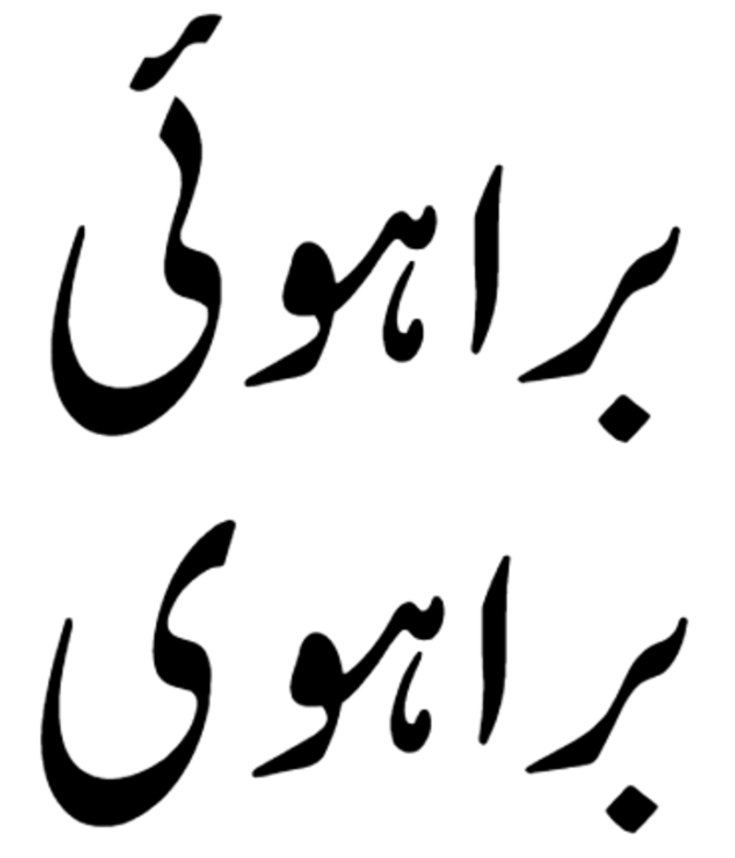
- Brahui and Brahvi written in the Nastaliq script
- Pronunciation: [bɾaːhuiː]
- Native to: Pakistan
- Region: Balochistan
- Ethnicity: Brahvis
- Native speakers: 2.7 million (2023)
- Language family: Dravidian: Northern; Brahvi
- Writing system: Arabic (Brahvi alphabet); Latin script (Brolikva)

Official status
- Regulated by: Department of Brahvi, University of Balochistan

Language codes
- ISO 639-3: brh
- Glottolog: brah1256
- Brahvi is geographically isolated from other Dravidian languages, spoken in Balochistan

- Brahvi is classified as Vulnerable by the UNESCO Atlas of the World's Languages in Danger.

Brahvi (براہوی, Brāhvī, [braːhʋiː]), also spelled Brahui (براہوئی, Brāhū'ī, [braːhu.iː], historically called the Kūrd/Kūrdgalla (Note: Brahui: کورد, [kuːrd])), is a north Dravidian language primarily spoken by the Brahvi people native to the central-southern regions of modern-day Balochistan, Pakistan.

It is geographically isolated from other Dravidian languages, with the nearest being over 1,500 kilometres (930 mi) away in South India. Brahvi constitutes a majority in the districts of Kalat, Khuzdar, Mastung, Quetta, Bolan, Nasirabad, Nushki, and Kharan.

It is also spoken by smaller communities in Iranian Baluchestan, Afghanistan, and Turkmenistan (around Merv). Expatriate Brahvi communities also exist in Iraq, Qatar, and the United Arab Emirates (UAE). Brahvi is the only Dravidian language that is primarily written in the Arabic script. It is also written in the Latin script.

== Etymology ==
The origin of the word "Brahvi" or "Brahui" is uncertain. Academic Mikhail Andronov hypothesised a derivation from Dravidian (lit. Northern hillmen). However, Josef Elfenbein found it unconvincing and hypothesised a derivation from Saraiki (Jaṭki) brāhō, referring to the prophet Abraham; the term perhaps served to distinguish the neo-Muslim nomadic pastoralists — who had migrated into Sindh from the Western Deccan c. a millennium ago and adopted Islam.

== Distribution ==
The proportion of people with Brahvi as their mother tongue in each Pakistani District as of the 2023 Pakistani Census

Brahvi is spoken in the central part of Pakistani Balochistan, mainly in the Kalat, Khuzdar, and Mastung districts, but also in smaller numbers in neighboring districts, as well as in Afghanistan which borders Pakistani Balochistan; however, many members of the ethnic group no longer speak Brahvi. There are also an unknown (but very small) number of expatriate Brahvis in the Arab states of the Persian Gulf, and Turkmenistan.

== History ==
There is no consensus as to whether Brahvi is a relatively recent language introduced into Balochistan or the remnant of a formerly more widespread Dravidian language family. According to Josef Elfenbein (1989), the most common theory is that the Brahvi were part of a Dravidian migration into north-western parts of the Pakistan in the 3rd millennium BC, but unlike other Dravidians who migrated to the south, they remained in Sarawan and Jahlawan since before 2000 BC. However, some other scholars see it as a recent migrant language to its present region. They postulate that Brahvi could only have migrated to Balochistan from central India after 1000 CE.

This is contradicted by genetic evidence that shows the Brahvi population to be indistinguishable from neighbouring Balochi speakers, and genetically distant from central Dravidian speakers. Others claimed that Brahvi was a Dravidian language spoken by the indigenous people of Kalat valley, and was later adopted by Baloch tribes who spoke Balochi and Bravui tribes who at the time spoke a language known as Kurdgali. The main Iranian contributor to Brahvi vocabulary, Balochi, is a Northwestern Iranian language, and moved to the area from the west only around 1000 CE. One scholar places the migration as late as the 13th or 14th century.

The Brahvi lexicon is believed to be of: 35% Perso-Arabic origin, 20% Balochi origin, 20% Indo-Aryan origin, 15% Dravidian origin, and 10% unknown origin. The Brahvi language, with all dialects, was called Kurdi or Kurdgali, after the Kurd tribe, with Brahvi becoming used more after the British colonization.

Linguists David W. McAlpin and Franklin Southworth proposed that Brahvi is not a Dravidian language, but can be linked with the remaining Dravidian languages and Elamite to form the "Zagrosian family," which originated in Southwest Asia (southern Iran) and was widely distributed in South Asia and parts of eastern West Asia before the Indo-Aryan migration.

The earliest written work of Brahui literature is the "Tuḥfat al-Aja īb" (lit. "Gift of Wonders"), a translation from Persian by Malikdad Gharsin Qalati, a court poet of Nasir Khan I, dating to c. 1759–1760. The Perso-Arabic script currently used to write Brahvi was developed c. 1900 through the efforts of Mulla Nabo-Jan and Maulana Fazl Mohammed Khan Darkhani, who sought to disseminate Islamic revivalist ideas. Literacy rates among Brahvi speakers remained very low as late as the 1990s..

== Dialects ==
There are no major dialectal differences. Jhalawani (southern, centered on Khuzdar) and Sarawani (northern, centered on Kalat) dialects are distinguished by the pronunciation of *h, which is retained only in the north (Elfenbein 1997). Brahvi has been influenced by the Iranian languages spoken in the area, including Persian, Balochi, and Pashto.

== Phonology ==
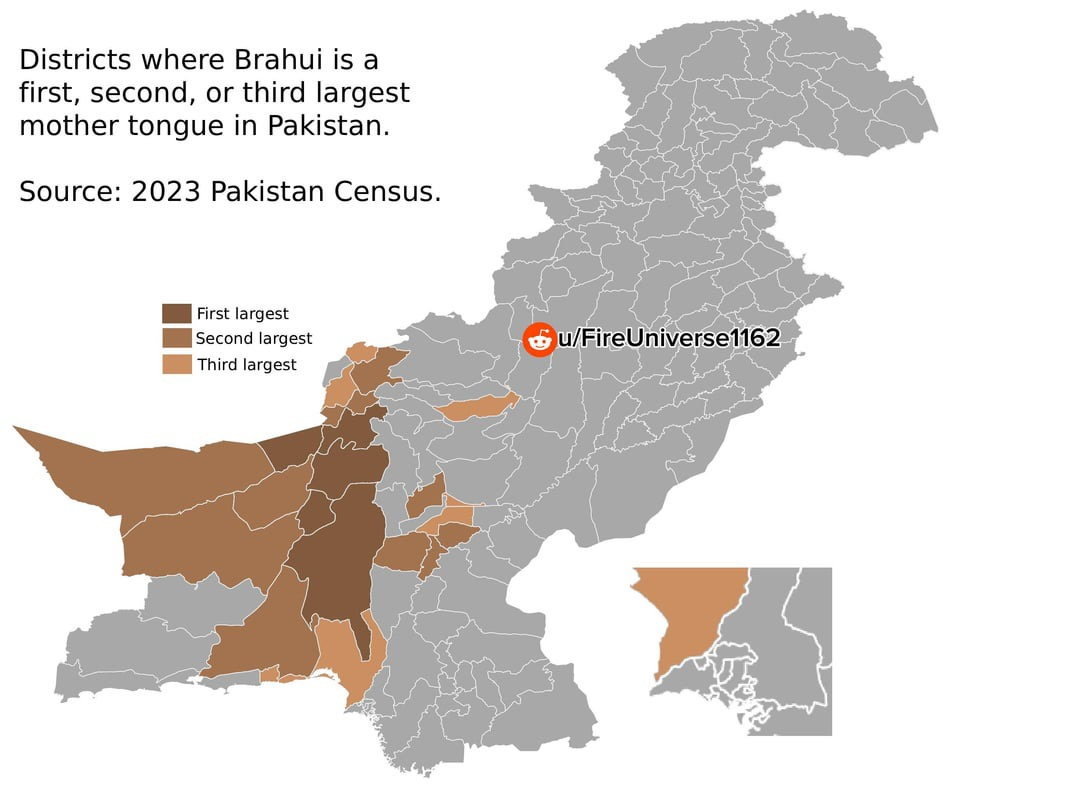
Brahvi as a first, second, and third largest mother tongue by district.

Brahvi vowels show a partial length distinction between long /aː eː iː oː uː/ and diphthongs /aɪ̯ aʊ̯/ and short

/a i u/. Brahvi does not have short /e, o/ due to influence from neighbouring Indo-Aryan and Iranic languages, the PD short *e was replaced by a, ē and i, and ∗o by ō, u and a in root syllables. However, some older sources, such as by Denys Bray, claimed that Brahvi has had a short /e/, in addition to its long counterpart.

Vowels
	Front	Central	Back
Close	i iː		u uː
Mid	(e) eː		oː
Open		a aː	

Brahvi consonants show patterns of retroflexion but lack the aspiration distinctions found in surrounding languages and include several fricatives such as the voiceless lateral fricative [ɬ], a sound not otherwise found in the region. Consonants are also very similar to those of Balochi, but Brahvi has more fricatives and nasals (Elfenbein 1993).

Consonants
	Labial		Dental alveolar		Retroflex		Palato- alveolar		Velar		Glottal
Nasal		m		n		ɳ				(ŋ)	
Stop	p	b	t	d	ʈ	ɖ	t͡ʃ	d͡ʒ	k	ɡ	ʔ
Fricative	f		s	z			ʃ	ʒ	x	ɣ	h
Lateral			ɬ	l							
Rhotic				ɾ		ɽ					
Glide								j		w	

- [h] of north corresponds to a glottal stop of south initially and intervocalically. Before a C in word-final position it is lost. Non-phonemic glottal stop before word-initial vowels, e.g. hust (N), ʔust (S) 'heart'.
- [ɬ] and [l] vary freely in many cases; contrast is limited to two or three items. Conditions for the emergence of [ɬ] are not clear.
- /ɽ/ does not occur word-initially. /r/ → /ɽ/ before /t d s z/ in northern Brahvi (Elfenbein 1998: 394), e.g. xūrt → xūṛt 'tiny'.
- The consonants [p t k] freely alternate with aspirated counterparts in the northeast. Aspirated stops word-initially occur in loanwords in the south, where they freely vary with unaspirated stops.
- [ŋ] occurs before velar stops /k, g/.
- Brahvi preserves the PD laryngeal */H/ as /h/ in some words e.g. PD. *caH- ~ *ceH- > Br. kah-.

=== Stress ===
Stress in Brahvi follows a quantity-based pattern, occurring either on the first long vowel or diphthong, or on the first syllable if all vowels are short.

== Morphology ==
=== Verbal morphology ===
Below is the paradigm of the simple verb uŧ "to be" in Brahvi:

Present
	Affirmative		Negative	
	Singular	Plural	Singular	Plural
1st person	uŧ	un	affaŧ	affan
2nd person	us	ure	affés	affére
3rd person	é	o	affak	affas

Past
	Affirmative		Negative	
	Singular	Plural	Singular	Plural
1st person	assuŧ	assun	allavaŧ	allavan
2nd person	assus	assure	allavés	allavére
3rd person	ass	assur/asso	allav	

Similarly, regular finite verbs exhibit two paradigmatic series affirmative vs negative. Below is the schematic overview of fully finite, non-negated paradigm of the verb bar ("to come").

Fully finite, non-negated, first person singular of the root bar ("to come")
	Form	Example	Meaning
Future/Present	Σ-i/e-PERS/NUM-a	bar-e-v-a	"I come"
Future	Σ-o-uŧ	bar-o-ŧ	"will come"
Past	Σ.PST-PERS/NUM	bass-uŧ	"I came"
Past Conditional	Σ-os-uŧ	bar-os-uŧ	"If I had come"
Imperfect	Σ.PST-PERS/NUM-a	bass-uŧ-a	"I was coming"
Perfect	Σ.PST-n-uŧ	bass-un-uŧ	"I have come"
Pluperfect	Σ.PST-s-uŧ	bass-us-uŧ	"I had come"
Subjunctive	Σ-e/i-PERS/NUM	bar-e-v	"I shall come"

== Orthography ==
Brahvi
- Brahvi has the rare letter "ڷ" and is written in Nastaliq script.
- Script type: Abjad
- Period: 20th century - present
- Languages: Brahvi language

Related scripts
- Parent systems: Proto-Sinaitic: Phoenician; Aramaic; Nabataean; Arabic; Persian alphabet; Urdu alphabet; Brahvi

Brahvi is the only Dravidian language which is not known to have been written in a Brahmi-based script.

=== Arabic script ===
Brahvi has been written in the Arabic script since the second half of the 20th century. Other Dravidian languages have also been historically written in the Arabic script by the Muslim minority speakers of each respective language, namely Arabi-Tamil and Arabi-Malayalam. In Pakistan, an Urdu based Nastaliq script is used in writing. Brahvi orthography is unique in having the letter "ڷ", representing the sound [ɬ]. Table below presents the letters adopted for Brahvi orthography:

Letter	Latin equivalent	IPA
ا	á, a, i, u	/aː/, /ə/, /ɪ/, /ʊ/
ب	b	/b/
پ	p	/p/
ت	t	/t/
ٹ	ŧ	/ʈ/
ث	(s)	/s/
ج	j	/d͡ʒ/
چ	c	/t͡ʃ/
ح	(h)	/h/
خ	x	/x/
د	d	/d/
ڈ	đ	/ɖ/
ذ	(z)	/z/
ر	r	/ɾ/
ڑ	ŕ	/ɽ/
ز	z	/z/
ژ	ź	/ʒ/
س	s	/s/
ش	ş	/ʃ/
ص	(s)	/s/
ض	(z)	/z/
ط	(t)	/t/
ظ	(z)	/z/
ع	', (a), (i), (u)	/ʔ/, /ə/, /ɪ/, /ʊ/
غ	ģ	/ɣ/
ف	f	/f/
ق	(k)	/k/
ک	k	/k/
گ	g	/ɡ/
ل	l	/l/
ڷ	ļ	/ɬ/
م	m	/m/
ن	n	/n/
ں	ń	/ɳ/
و	v, o, ú	/w~ʋ/, /o/, /u/
ہ	h	/h/
ھ	(h)	/h/
ی	y, í	/j/, /iː/
ے	e	/eː/

=== Latin script ===
More recently, a Roman-based orthography named Brolikva (an abbreviation of Brahvi Roman Likvar) was developed by the Brahvi Language Board of the University of Balochistan (UoB) in Quetta and adopted by the newspaper Talár.

Below is the new promoted Bráhuí Báşágal Brolikva orthography:

Aa /ə/	Ii /ɪ/	Uu /ʊ/	Ee /eː/	Oo /oː/	Kk /k/	Gg /g/	Xx /x/	Hh /h/	Pp /p/	Bb /b/	Ff /f/	Vv /w~ʋ/	Tt /t/	Dd /d/	Cc /t͡ʃ/	Ss /s/	Zz /z/	Jj /d͡ʒ/	Mm /m/	Nn /n/ (/ŋ/)	Rr /ɾ/	Ll /l/	Yy /j/
Áá /aː/	Íí /iː/	Úú /uː/				Ģģ /ɣ/						(Ww) /w~ʋ/	Ŧŧ /ʈ/	Đđ /ɖ/		Şş /ʃ/	Źź /ʒ/			Ńń /ɳ/	Ŕŕ /ɽ/	Ļļ /ɬ/	

The letters with diacritics are the long vowels, the post-alveolar or retroflex consonants, and the voiced velar or voiceless alveolar fricatives.

The native alphabetic order is: b á p í s y ş v (w) x e z ź ģ f ú m n l g c t ŧ r ŕ d o đ h j k a i u ń ļ

== Sample text ==
=== Universal Declaration of Human Rights ===
==== English ====
"All human beings are born free and equal in dignity and rights. They are endowed with reason and conscience and should act towards one another in a spirit of brotherhood."

==== Arabic script ====
"مُچَّا اِنسَاںک آجو او اِزَّت نَا رِد اَٹ بَرےبَر وَدِى مَسُّنو. اوفتے پُهِى او دَلِىل رَسےںگَانے. اَندَادے وفتے اَسِ اےلو تون اِىلُمِى اے وَدِّفوئِى اے."

==== Latin script ====
"Muccá insáńk ájo o izzat ná rid aŧ barebar vadí massuno. Ofte puhí o dalíl raseńgáne. andáde ofte asi elo ton ílumí e vaddifoí e."

== Endangerment ==
According to a 2009 UNESCO report, Brahvi is one of the 27 languages of Pakistan that are facing the danger of extinction. It was classified as "unsafe", the least endangered level out of the five levels of concern (Unsafe, Definitely Endangered, Severely Endangered, Critically Endangered and Extinct). This status has since been renamed to "vulnerable". In 2014, a constitution amendment bill was proposed in the National Assembly of Pakistan to make Brahvi, alongside other regional languages, as national languages of Pakistan.

=== Publications ===
Talár is the first daily newspaper in the Brahvi language. It uses the new Roman orthography and is "an attempt to standardize and develop [the] Brahvi language to meet the requirements of modern political, social and scientific discourse".
