= 2024 in Pakistan =

- Decades: 2000s; 2010s; 2020s
- See also: History of Pakistan; List of years in Pakistan; Timeline of Pakistani history

The events listed below are both anticipated and scheduled for the year 2024 in Pakistan.

== Incumbents ==
=== Federal government ===
S. No	Photo	Name	Office
1		Arif Alvi (until 10 March 2024)	President of Pakistan
1		Asif Ali Zardari (from 10 March 2024)	President of Pakistan
2		Anwar ul Haq Kakar (Until 4 March)	Prime Minister of Pakistan
2		Shehbaz Sharif (From 4 March)	Prime Minister of Pakistan
3		Sadiq Sanjrani (Until 9 March 2024)	Chairman of the Senate
3		Yusuf Raza Gillani (From 9 March)	Chairman of the Senate
4		Raja Pervaiz Ashraf (until 1 March 2024)	Speaker of the National Assembly
4		Ayaz Sadiq (from 1 March 2024)	Speaker of the National Assembly
5		Yahya Afridi	Chief Justice of Pakistan
6		Sikandar Sultan Raja	Chief Election Commissioner of Pakistan
7		16th National Assembly of Pakistan (from 29 February 2024)	National Assembly
8		16th Senate of Pakistan	Senate of Pakistan

=== Provincial government ===
Province	Governor	Chief Minister			Government Type	Chief Justice				
Balochistan	Sheikh Jaffar Khan Mandokhail (since 6 May 2024)	Ali Mardan Khan Domki (until 2 March 2024)		Caretaker	Caretaker	Muhammad Hashim Kakar (acting) (BHC)		Sarfaraz Bugti(from Mar 2024)		PPP
Balochistan	Sheikh Jaffar Khan Mandokhail (since 6 May 2024)	Ali Amin Gandapur (from 2 March 2024)	Ghulam Ali	Muhammad Azam Khan (until 2 March 2024)		Muhammad Hashim Kakar (acting) (BHC)	Caretaker	Caretaker	Muhammad Ibrahim Khan (PHC)	
Khyber Pakhtunkhwa		Ali Amin Gandapur (from 2 March 2024)	Ghulam Ali	PTI					Muhammad Ibrahim Khan (PHC)	
Punjab	Sardar Saleem Haider Khan	Mohsin Naqvi (until 26 February 2024)		Caretaker	Caretaker	Malik Shehzad Ahmed Khan (LHC)				
Punjab	Sardar Saleem Haider Khan	Maryam Nawaz (from 26 February 2024)		PML-N		Malik Shehzad Ahmed Khan (LHC)				
Sindh	Kamran Tessori	Maqbool Baqar (until 27 February 2024)		Caretaker	Caretaker	Aqeel Ahmed Abbasi (SHC)				
Sindh	Kamran Tessori	Murad Ali Shah (from 27 February 2024)		PPP		Aqeel Ahmed Abbasi (SHC)				

=== State government ===
Province	President	Prime minister		Government Type	Chief Justice
Gilgit-Baltistan	Mehdi Shah	Gulbar Khan	PTI	Coalition	Shamim Khan (SACGB)
Azad Kashmir	Sultan Mehmood Chaudhry	Chaudhry Anwarul Haq	PTI	Coalition	Raja Saeed Akram Khan (SCAJK)

=== Services chief ===
S. No	Photo	Name	Office
1		Asim Munir	Chief of Army Staff
2		Zaheer Ahmad Babar	Chief of Air Staff
3		Naveed Ashraf	Chief of Naval Staff
4		Sahir Shamshad Mirza	Chairman Joint Chiefs of Staff Committee

== Events ==
=== January ===
- 2 January – Unidentified gunmen kill six barbers in Mir Ali, Khyber Pakhtunkhwa.
- 10 January – The Supreme Court of Pakistan upholds the 2019 death sentence upon former leader Pervez Musharraf, who died in February 2023.
- 16 January – 2024 Iranian missile strikes in Pakistan: Iran launches a missile attack within Balochistan, targeting what it describes are terrorist sites. Pakistan calls the action an "unprovoked violation" of its airspace resulting in the death of two children and injuries to three others.
- 17 January – Pakistan recalls its ambassador to Iran in response to the attack on Balochistan the previous day.
- 18 January – Operation Marg Bar Sarmachar: The Pakistan Air Force launches "precision airstrikes" on Baloch separatist targets inside Iran in retaliation for its attacks on Balochistan. Camps belonging to the Baluch Liberation Front and Balochistan Liberation Army (BLA) are reportedly hit. Explosions are reported in the city of Saravan. Four women and three children are killed in the strikes, all of whom are foreign nationals.
- 27 January – In Iran, three gunmen kill nine Pakistani labourers in Saravan.
- 29 January – The BLA launches a coordinated attack dubbed "Operation Dara-e-Bolan" on Pakistani security forces, attacking checkpoints and military bases in Machh, and attacking other areas, including Kolpur.
- 30 January – Former prime minister Imran Khan is sentenced to 10 years in prison for leaking state secrets.

=== February ===
- 5 February – Ten policemen are killed and six more injured during an attack by Tehreek-e-Jihad Pakistan militants on a police station in Dera Ismail Khan, Khyber Pakhtunkhwa.
- 7 February – 2024 Balochistan bombings: Twin bombings outside electoral offices kill at least 29 people and injure dozens more in Balochistan ahead of the general election. The Islamic State claims responsibility for the attacks.
- 8 February –
  - Five police officers are killed and two others are injured assailants detonate a bomb and open fire at a police van in Khyber Pakhtunkhwa.
  - 2024 Pakistani general election: Voters elect members of the 16th National Assembly.
    - 2024 Balochistan provincial election
    - 2024 Khyber Pakhtunkhwa provincial election
    - 2024 Punjab provincial election
    - 2024 Sindh provincial election
  - Mobile phone services are temporarily suspended and thousands of troops are deployed to protect polling stations. Five policemen and two children are killed during two separate bombings, targeting a patrol and a polling station respectively.
- 10 February – 2024 Pakistani general election: Despite a lead by candidates affiliated with Imran Khan's Pakistan Tehreek-i-Insaf, the Pakistan Muslim League (N) (PML-N)'s Nawaz Sharif claims victory amidst allegations of military-led rigging.
- 14 February - The PML-N, the Pakistan People's Party (PPP) and other allied parties announce that it would form a coalition government.
- 19 February – The Senate of Pakistan rejects a bill to introduce the public hanging of rapists.

=== March ===
- 3 March –
  - Twenty-nine people are killed and 59 more injured during heavy rains that cause landslides across the country in the past 48 hours.
  - Shehbaz Sharif is elected as Pakistan's prime minister for a second term.
- 6 March – The Supreme Court of Pakistan unanimously rules that former leader Zulfikar Ali Bhutto was denied a fair trial before his execution by hanging in April 1979.
- 10 March –
  - Asif Ali Zardari is elected as President of Pakistan for the second time.
  - Two people are killed and another person is injured in a motorcycle bombing in Peshawar.
- 12 March – Nine people are killed and two others are injured after a three-story residential building collapses in Multan.
- 16 March – Seven soldiers and six militants are killed in a combined suicide bombing and gun attack on a military post in North Waziristan, Khyber Pakhtunkhwa. The attack is claimed by Jaish-e-Fursan-e-Muhammad.
- 18 March – 2024 Pakistan-Afghanistan skirmishes: In response to the attacks in North Waziristan on 16 March, Pakistan retaliates by air striking alleged TTP hideouts inside Afghanistan. The Taliban government claims that the air strikes by Pakistan kill eight civilians. Following this, cross-border attacks via shelling and mortar began between the two countries.
- 20 March –
  - Eight militants are killed and two members of the security forces are injured in an attack on Gwadar Port, Balochistan, that is claimed by the BLA.
  - Twelve people are killed and eight more are rescued after an explosion at a coal mine in Harnai District, Balochistan.
- 21 March – Two soldiers are killed and 15 others are injured in a bomb attack on a security forces convoy in Dera Ismail Khan, Khyber Pakhtunkhwa.
- 25 March – Four militants are killed in an attack on PNS Siddique in Turbat, Balochistan, that is claimed by the BLA.
- 26 March:
  - Four militants are killed in a military raid in Dera Ismail Khan.
  - 2024 Shangla bombing: Five Chinese nationals and their Pakistani driver are killed in a suicide bomb attack on a convoy near Besham, Khyber Pakhtunkhwa.
- 30 March:
  - One person is killed and 14 others, including three soldiers, are injured in a bomb attack in Harnai District, Balochistan.
  - At least eight people are killed by building collapses caused by heavy rains in Khyber Pakhtunkhwa.

=== April ===
- 2 April – 2024 Pakistani Senate election
- 5 April – Eight militants are killed during clashes with the army in Dera Ismail Khan District, Khyber Pakhtunkhwa.
- 6 April – Two police officers are killed and two others are injured after their vehicle is ambushed in a gun attack by the Pakistani Taliban in Lakki Marwat District, Khyber Pakhtunkhwa. One police officer is killed in a roadside bombing in Bajaur District.
- 7 April – Two people are killed and five others, including two police officers, are injured in a motorcycle bombing in Khuzdar, Balochistan.
- 8 April – A police officer is killed and six others are injured in a grenade attack on a mosque near Quetta.
- 10 April – A bus carrying Eid Al-Fitr pilgrims plunges into a ditch in Lasbela District, Balochistan, killing 17 people and injuring 16 others.
- 12 April:
  - Pakistan designates the Liwa Zainebiyoun, a group suspected of ties with Iran, as a terrorist organization.
  - Militants set up a roadblock near Nushki, Balochistan, and attack two approaching vehicles including a bus, killing 11 people and injuring six.
- 12-17 April – At least 63 people are killed due to heavy rainfall and lightning across the country.
- 17 April:
  - The Sindh High Court orders the federal government to restore public access to X following its blockage during the general election in February.
  - Security forces kill seven militants trying to enter the country from Afghanistan near Ghulam Khan, Khyber Pakhtunkhwa.
- 18 April – Four officials of the Pakistan Customs are killed in a gun attack on their vehicle in Dera Ismail Khan District, Khyber Pakhtunkhwa.
- 19 April – Three people are injured in a suicide bombing targeting a van carrying Japanese nationals in Karachi.
- 20 April:
  - A flood alert is issued in Khyber Pakhtunkhwa due to glacial melt.
  - Two officials of the Pakistan Customs are killed and three others are injured in a gun attack on a checkpoint in Dera Ismail Khan District, Khyber Pakhtunkhwa.
- 19 April – Eleven militants are killed in raids by the Pakistani military in Dera Ismail Khan and North Waziristan Districts, Khyber Pakhtunkhwa.
- 27 April – A judge is abducted by armed militants while traveling in Dera Ismail Khan District, Khyber Pakhtunkhwa. He is later rescued in an operation by security forces on 29 April.
- 30 April – A police officer is killed in a gun attack on a polio vaccination team in Bajaur District, Khyber Pakhyunkhwa.

=== May ===
- 2 May – One person is killed and 18 others are injured after two landmines explode in Duki District, Balochistan.
- 3 May:
  - A bus plunges into a ravine along the Karakoram Highway in Gilgit-Baltistan, killing 20 people and injuring 30 others.
  - Three people, including a journalist, are killed in a car bombing in Khuzdar, Balochistan.
  - Pakistan embarked on its maiden lunar mission with the successful launch of the iCube Qamar (Moon).
- 8 May:
  - Six militants are killed in separate military raids in Khyber Pakhtunkhwa.
  - A girls' school is damaged in a bomb attack in Shawa, Khyber Pakhtunkhwa, injuring a guard.
- 9 May - Seven barbershop workers are killed by militants in Gwadar.
- 10-13 May - 2024 Azad Kashmir protests: Four people, including a police officer are killed during protests against rising prices in Azad Kashmir.
- 14 May - Four members of the same family are killed in a drone strike on their residence in South Waziristan.
- 16 May - A school is destroyed in a bomb attack in South Waziristan.
- 25 May - A mob burns down a house and factory in Sargodha over alleged blasphemy by its Christian owner, who dies on 3 June after sustaining injuries from the attack. More than 100 people are subsequently arrested on suspicion of participating in the attack.
- 27 May - Seven soldiers and 23 militants are killed during clashes in Khyber Pakhtunkhwa.
- 29 May:
  - A school is destroyed in an arson attack in North Waziristan.
  - Four Pakistanis are killed and two others are injured after their vehicle is fired upon by Iranian border guards near Mashkel, Balochistan.

=== June ===
- 3 June:
  - A police officer is killed in a gun attack on a polio vaccination team in Lakki Marwat District, Khyber Pakhtunkhwa.
  - The Islamabad High Court overturns Imran Khan's conviction on leaking state secrets in January 2024.
- 9 June - 2024 Lakki Marwat bombing - Seven soldiers are killed in a bomb attack on a military convoy in Lakki Marwat District, Khyber Pakhtunkhwa.
- 10-11 June - Eleven militants are killed in a military raid in Khyber Pakhtunkhwa conducted in retaliation for 9 June bombing in Lakki Marwat.
- 11 June - The World Bank approves a $1 billion loan to Pakistan for the construction of the Dasu Dam in Khyber Pakhtunkhwa.
- 15 June - A Japanese climber is found dead while his companion is reported missing following an incident at Mount Spantik.
- 20 June - A man in Madyan, Khyber Pakhtunkhwa is killed after being lynched for alleged blasphemy by a mob that also sets fire to the police station where he is being held.
- 21 June - An IED kills five Pakistan Army personnel in Kurram District, Khyber Pakhtunkhwa.
- 26 June - Authorities announce the arrest of two senior commanders of the Pakistani Taliban in Balochistan.
- 27 June -
  - An appeals court upholds Imran Khan's conviction for entering into an invalid marriage with his wife Bushra Bibi.
  - 2024 Pakistan heat wave: At least 568 people die from heat-related illnesses due to extreme temperatures and humidity in southern Pakistan, with at least 427 deaths reported in Karachi alone.

=== July ===
- 1 July –
  - A Christian man is sentenced to death by a court in Sahiwal for blasphemy charges in connection with the 2023 Jaranwala church arsons.
  - Rawalakot prison escape: One inmate is killed while seventeen others escape in a mass jailbreak in Rawalakot, Azad Kashmir.
  - Three people are killed in a roadside bombing in Turbat District, Balochistan.
  - Two members of the security forces are killed in a rocket attack on their post in Jamrud, Khyber Pakhtunkhwa.
- 3 July – Former senator Hidayat Ullah and four other people are killed in a bomb attack on his vehicle in Bajaur District, Khyber Pakhtunkhwa.
- 5 July – Three people are killed while seven others are injured after a bomb explodes on a bridge while a rickshaw passes by in Mardan District, Khyber Pakhtunkhwa.
- 8 July – A court in Kenya rules that the 2022 killing of Pakistani journalist Arshad Sharif by police in Nairobi was unlawful and orders the Kenyan government to pay 10 million Kenyan shillings ($78,000) as compensation to his family.
- 10 July –
  - The Pakistani government grants an extension of residence permits to Afghan refugees carrying proper documentation until 30 June 2025.
  - A Pakistani Taliban commander is killed along with two militants and three members of the security forces during a raid on their hideout in Matni, Khyber Pakhtunkhwa.
  - Fourteen people are killed and one person is injured after a jeep falls into a ravine in the Neelam Valley in Azad Kashmir.
- 12 July:
  - The Supreme Court rules that the Pakistan Tehreek-i-Insaf was unlawfully deprived of at least 20 reserved seats in the National Assembly following the results of the general election in February.
  - Pakistan reaches an agreement to obtain a $7 billion loan from the International Monetary Fund.
- 13 July – A court in Islamabad overturns Imran Khan's conviction for entering into an invalid marriage with his wife Bushra Bibi.
- 15 July –
  - Bannu Cantonment attack: Eight members of the security forces and ten militants are killed in a suicide attack on a military compound in Bannu, Khyber Pakhtunkhwa that is claimed by the Hafiz Gul Bahadur faction of the Pakistani Taliban.
  - The government moves forward a case to ban the Pakistan Tehreek-e-Insaf due to alleged use of illegal foreign funds and its support for the 2023 Pakistani protests. It also announces plans to file treason charges against PTI leader Imran Khan and former Pakistani president Arif Alvi.
- 16 July - Five people are killed in a militant attack on a healthcare facility in Dera Ismail Khan.
- 19 July:
  - Amin ul Haq, a close aide of Osama bin Laden, is arrested by the Counter Terrorism Department near Jhelum.
  - Two people are killed in a bomb attack in South Waziristan.
- 20 July – Demonstrators carrying Afghan flags storm the Pakistani consulate in Frankfurt, Germany.
- 26 July–11 August – Pakistan at the 2024 Summer Olympics in Paris.
- 29 July:
  - Zaheerul Hassan Shah, the deputy leader of the Tehreek-e-Labaik Pakistan, is arrested after offering a 10 million rupee-($36,000) reward for the death of Chief Justice Qazi Faez Isa for granting bail to an Ahmadiyya member charged with blasphemy.
  - Protesters taking part in a march in Gwadar attack security forces deployed to guard them, killing one soldier and injuring 16 others, according to the Pakistani Army.
- 30 July:
  - At least 14 people are reported killed in flash floods in Kohat District, Khyber Pakhtunkhwa.
  - Unidentified gunmen open fire on a bulletproof vehicle carrying local staff working for a United Nations development agency in Dera Ismail Khan. No casualties are reported.

=== August ===
- 1 August – One person is killed in Lahore following floods caused by a cloudburst.
- 2 August – Two police officers are killed in a gun attack on a vehicle carrying three judges in Dera Ismail Khan District, Khyber Pakhtunkhwa.
- 8 August – Arshad Nadeem clinches Pakistan's first Olympic track and field medal after winning gold at the men's javelin throw at the 2024 Summer Olympics in Paris.
- 9 August – Three soldiers and four militants are killed in attacks on three army outposts in the Tirah Valley, Khyber Pakhtunkhwa, that are claimed by the Gul Bahadur faction of the Pakistani Taliban.
- 12 August – Zakir Baloch, the deputy commissioner of Mastung District, Balochistan, is killed in a gun attack on his vehicle. Three suspects are subsequently killed in a raid by security forces in Mastung on 20 August.
- 13 August –
  - Faiz Hameed, the former head of Inter-Services Intelligence, is arrested on charges of abuse of power involving a raid on a private property development business when he was in office.
  - Three people are killed and six others are injured in grenade attacks on a house and a shop selling Pakistani flags for Independence Day in Quetta. The Balochistan Liberation Army claims responsibility.
  - Three Afghan civilians are killed during clashes between the Afghan Taliban and Pakistani forces at the Torkham border crossing.
- 14 August – One person is killed and ten others are injured in a grenade attack outside a hotel in Quetta.
- 15 August – The first case of clade 1b mpox in Asia is discovered in Mardan District, Khyber Pakhtunkhwa, from a patient who had travelled to the Middle East.
- 19 August –
  - Pakistan reports a case of mpox in Azad Kashmir, raising the total of cases in the country to four. In response, Prime Minister Shehbaz Sharif announces that the country will now be screening people at entry points for the disease.
  - Clashes between security forces and militants entering from Afghanistan leave five militants and three soldiers dead in Bajaur District, Khyber Pakhtunkhwa.
- 21 August – A freelance web developer in Lahore is arrested on suspicion of spreading online misinformation regarding the 2024 Southport stabbing that contributed to the 2024 United Kingdom riots. He is acquitted on 26 August.
- 22 August –
  - Twelve police officers are killed in an attack on their convoy by bandits in Rahim Yar Khan.
  - Two children are killed in a gun attack on a school van in Attock.
- 24 August – Three people, including two children, are killed in a motorcycle bombing near a police station in Pishin, Balochistan.
- 25 August –
  - A bus falls off a ravine along the Makran Coastal Highway in Lasbela District, Balochistan, killing 12 people and injuring 32 others.
  - A bus falls off a ravine in Kahuta, Punjab, killing all 24 people on board.
- 26 August –
  - Twenty-three people are killed after being waylaid from vehicles and shot in Musakhail District, Balochistan. The Balochistan Liberation Army claims responsibility.
  - Nine people, including four police officers, are killed in a gun attack in Kalat District, Balochistan.
- 28 August – Four people, including a lieutenant-colonel, are abducted by unidentified assailants in Dera Ismail Khan. They are released on 31 August.
- 30 August –
  - Twelve people are killed in a mudslide in Upper Dir, Khyber Pakhtunkhwa.
  - Twelve Pakistani Taliban members are killed during a raid by the Pakistani Army in the Tirah Valley of Khyber Pakhtunkhwa, bringing the number of insurgents killed there to 37 since 20 August.

=== September ===
- 2 September – Three people are killed after their bus is struck by a mudslide in Kohistan District, Khyber Pakhtunkhwa.
- 9 September –
  - Nine people are injured in a bomb attack on a vehicle carrying security personnel escorting polio vaccination workers in South Waziristan.
  - Two Pakistani nationals, including Saad Hussain Rizvi, the leader of the Tehreek-e-Labbaik Pakistan, are convicted in absentia by a court in the Netherlands for making death threats against anti-Islam politician Geert Wilders.
- 11 September – A police officer and a polio vaccination worker are killed in a gun attack in Bajaur District, Khyber Pakhtunkhwa.
- 12 September –
  - A man in police custody on blasphemy charges is shot dead by a police officer in Quetta.
  - A police officer escorting polio vaccination workers is killed in a gun attack in Bannu District, Khyber Pakhtunkhwa.
  - A woman working as a polio vaccinator is gang-raped while performing her duties in Jacobabad. One suspect is arrested.
- 14 September – Two police officers are killed in a bomb attack on their vehicle in Kuchlak, Balochistan. The Islamic State claims responsibility.
- 19 September –
  - A doctor wanted on blasphemy charges is shot dead by police at a checkpoint in Mirpur Khas.
  - Three members of the security forces are killed in an attack by militants in North Waziristan.
- 20 September – Six soldiers are killed in an attack by militants in Misha, South Waziristan.
- 22–25 September – At least 25 people are killed in clashes between Sunni and Shia Muslims caused by a land dispute in Kurram District, Khyber Pakhtunkhwa.
- 22 September – A police officer is killed and four others are injured in an IED attack on a multinational diplomatic convoy in Malam Jabba, Khyber Pakhtunkhwa.
- 23 September – Lieutenant General Asim Malik is appointed as Director-General of Inter-Services Intelligence effective 30 September.
- 25 September –
  - At least 25 people are killed and dozens are injured in clashes between Shia and Sunni Muslim tribes in Kurram District, Khyber Pakhtunkhwa since 20 September.
  - The International Monetary Fund approves a $7 billion loan for Pakistan to help its economy, with $1 billion being disbursed immediately and the rest in instalments over 37 months.
- 26 September – Eight militants are killed in a military raid in North Waziristan.
- 28 September –
  - 2024 Mari Petroleum Mil Mi-8 crash: A Mil Mi-8 helicopter chartered by Mari Petroleum crashes in the Shewa oil field in North Waziristan due to engine failure, killing six people and injuring eight others.
  - Seven labourers from Punjab are killed and an eighth is injured following a gun attack on the house they were renting in Panjgur District, Balochistan.
- 29 September – Twenty labourers working for a private energy company are abducted in an attack on their camp by gunmen in Musakhel District, Balochistan.

=== October ===
- 2 October – Six Baloch Liberation Army militants are reported killed in a raid by security forces in Harnai District, Balochistan.
- 3 October – A bus falls into a ravine near Quetta, killing at least seven people and injuring 17 others.
- 5 October – Six soldiers, including a lieutenant-colonel, and eight militants are killed in separate clashes in North Waziristan and Swat District, Khyber Pakhtunkhwa.
- 5–6 October – A police officer is killed during protests by supporters of Imran Khan in Islamabad, resulting in attempted murder charges being filed against Khan on 8 October.
- 6 October –
  - Two Chinese nationals are killed while ten people are injured in a car bombing near Jinnah International Airport in Karachi on a convoy carrying Chinese employees of the Pakistan Port Qasim Power Project. The Balochistan Liberation Army claims responsibility.
  - The government declares the Pashtun Tahafuz Movement as a "proscribed group", accusing it of engaging "in certain activities which are prejudicial to the peace and security of the country".
- 10 October – Two police officers are killed in a gun attack on their vehicle in Tank, Khyber Pakhtunkhwa.
- 11 October – At least 21 people are killed in a gun attack on a coal mine in Duki District, Balochistan.
- 12 October – At least 11 people are killed in intertribal clashes across Kurram District, Khyber Pakhtunkhwa.
- 14 October – The New Gwadar International Airport is opened in a ceremony led by Prime Minister Shehbaz Sharif and Chinese Premier Li Qiang.
- 15 October – 2024 SCO summit (Heads of government) in Islamabad.
- 17 October – Punjab closes schools and universities due to student protests following an alleged rape at the Punjab College for Women.
- 20 October – Two transgender women are stabbed to death in an attack on their residence in Mardan, Khyber Pakhtunkhwa.
- 21 October – The federal government passes the 26th Constitutional Amendment Bill to the Constitution of Pakistan, providing for the selection of the Chief Justice of the Supreme Court by a parliamentary committee and setting the officeholder's tenure at three years.
- 22 October – Yahya Afridi is selected to become the next Chief Justice of Pakistan by a parliamentary committee and President Zardari.
- 24 October – Nineteen militants are killed in separate encounters with security forces in Khyber Pakhtunkhwa and Punjab.
- 26 October – Four members of the security forces are killed in a suicide car bombing on a checkpoint in Mir Ali, Khyber Pakhtunkhwa.
- 29 October – Two police officers and three militants are killed in an attack on a polio vaccination center in Orakzai District, Khyber Pakhtunkhwa.
- 30 October – Eight militants, including a commander, are killed in a raid by security forces in Bannu District, Khyber Pakhtunkhwa.

=== November ===
- 1 November – Nine people are killed in a motorcycle bombing in Mastung District, Balochistan.
- 4 November – The National Assembly votes in favour of extending the tenures of heads of the Pakistan Armed Forces and its service branches from three to five years.
- 5 November – Two Chinese nationals are injured in a shooting by a security guard at a textile factory in Karachi.
- 6 November –
  - Four members of the security forces are killed in a bomb attack in South Waziristan.
  - Two children are killed in a mortar attack in Tirah.
- 9 November – 2024 Quetta railway station bombing: A suicide bomber detonates at a platform inside Quetta railway station, killing 26 people and injuring 62 others. The Balochistan Liberation Army claims responsibility.
- 11 November – A police constable is arrested on suspicion of helping aid the perpetrator of the 2023 Peshawar mosque bombing.
- 12 November – A bus falls into the Indus River in Gilgit-Baltistan, killing 18 people and injuring another.
- 13 November –
  - Eight members of the Pakistani Taliban are killed in a raid by security forces in North Waziristan.
  - Four militants are killed in a raid by security forces in Kech District, Balochistan.
- 14 November – Seven people are killed in the accidental explosion of a car bomb inside the house of a Pakistani Taliban commander in Mir Ali.
- 15 November –
  - A health emergency is declared in Punjab due to heavy smog that also forces a lockdown in Lahore and Multan.
  - Seven soldiers and six BLA militants are killed in a shootout in Kalat District, Balochistan.
- 18 November –
  - The Council of Islamic Ideology rules against the usage of VPNs as contrary to Sharia law amid efforts by the government to outlaw it.
  - Ten Lashkar-e-Islam militants are killed in a raid by security forces on their hideout in Tirah.
- 19 November – Twelve members of the security forces and six militants are killed in a suicide car bombing and shootout at a security post in Bannu that is claimed by the Hafiz Gul Bahadur Group.
- 21 November – 2024 Kurram massacre : At least 42 people are killed while 20 others are injured in a gun attack on a convoy carrying Shiites in Kurram. Subsequent clashes between Sunni and Shiite groups in Kurram from 21 until 23 November leave a total of 82 dead and 156 others injured.
- 26 November – At least six people are killed in clashes in Islamabad between police and PTI supporters demanding the release of Imran Khan.

=== December ===
- 4 December – Five militants are killed in a raid by security forces on their hideout in Lakki Marwat.
- 7 December – Seven members of the security forces are killed in an attack on a checkpoint in Bagam, Khyber Pakhtunkhwa.
- 9 December –
  - The Government of Azad Kashmir revokes the Peaceful Assembly and Public Order Ordinance 2024 that was introduced in November and barred "unregistered organisations" from holding protests without permission following widespread protests and strikes in the region.
  - Two suspected militants are killed in a premature motorcycle bombing in Killa Abdullah, Balochistan.
- 16 December – A man kills his wife and her alleged paramour in an honour killing in the Bhag area of Karachi.
- 17 December –
  - Two police officers are killed in a gun attack on an outpost in Shangla, Khyber Pakhtunkhwa.
  - Three police officers escorting polio vaccination workers are killed in a bomb attack on their vehicle in Dera Ismail Khan.
- 18 December – The United States imposes sanctions on four entities involved in the Pakistani missile research and development program.
- 21 December – At least 16 soldiers are killed in an attack by the Pakistani Taliban on an outpost in South Waziristan.
- 26 December – Thirteen militants are killed in raids by security forces in Khyber Pakhtunkhwa.
- 28 December – The Afghan Taliban says it had launched attacks on multiple targets in Pakistan in retaliation for airstrikes by the latter inside Afghanistan on 24 December.
- 30 December –
  - A bus overturns in Fateh Jang, Punjab, killing ten passengers and injuring seven others.
  - A van collides with a truck in Naushahro Feroze, Sindh, killing eight passengers.
- 31 December – Two people are killed in a gun attack on a police outpost in Dera Ismail Khan.

== Holidays ==
- 5 February – Kashmir Solidarity Day
- 23 March – Pakistan Day
- 10 April to 12 April – Eid al-Fitr
- 1 May – Labour Day
- 28 May - Youm-e-Takbir
- 17–18 June – Eid al-Adha
- 16–17 July – Ashura
- 14 August – Independence Day
- 16 September – Milad un-Nabi
- 9 November - Iqbal Day
- 25 December – Quaid-e-Azam Day

== Arts and entertainment ==
- List of Pakistani films of 2024
- List of 2024 box office number-one films in Pakistan
- List of Pakistani submissions for the Academy Award for Best International Feature Film

== Deaths ==
- 2 January
  - Sartaj Aziz, 94, politician and economist, minister of foreign affairs (1998–1999, 2013–2017), national security advisor (2013–2015) and three-time minister of finance.
  - Qaiser Rashid Khan, 62, jurist, chief justice of the Peshawar High Court (2021–2023).
- 5 January: Masood ur Rehman Usmani, Islamic scholar.
- 7 January: Norma Fernandes, teacher.
- 11 January: Khalid Butt, actor (Shah, Rahm, Motorcycle Girl) and film producer.
- 13 January: Shaukat Zaidi, 72, actor (Hum Sub Umeed Se Hain), journalist and playwright.
- 15 January: James Masih Shera, 77, Pakistani-born British politician and educationist.
- 20 January: Ali Zia, 66, cricket player and coach (Bangladesh national team).
- 25 January: Elahi Bux Soomro, 97, politician, member (1985–2007) and speaker (1996–2001) of the National Assembly.
- 31 January: Rehan Zaib Khan, politician.
- 3 March: Farhan Khan, footballer.
- 20 March: Saeed Ahmed, cricketer.
- 10 May: Akmal Lewane, poet.
- 26 May: Talat Hussain, actor.

== See also ==
=== Country overviews ===
- Pakistan
- Economy of Pakistan
- Government of Pakistan
- History of Pakistan
- History of modern Pakistan
- Outline of Pakistan
- Politics of Pakistan
- Years in Pakistan

=== Related timelines for current period ===
- 2024
- 2020s
- 21st century
