= 2026 in Pakistan =

- Decades: 2000s; 2010s; 2020s
- See also: History of Pakistan; List of years in Pakistan; Timeline of Pakistani history

The events listed below are both anticipated and scheduled for the year 2026 in Pakistan.

The year 2026 will be the 79th year of the independence of Pakistan.

== Incumbents ==
=== Federal government ===
S. No	Photo	Name	Office
1		Asif Ali Zardari	President of Pakistan
2		Shehbaz Sharif	Prime Minister of Pakistan
3		Yusuf Raza Gilani	Chairman of the Senate
4		Ayaz Sadiq	Speaker of the National Assembly
5		Yahya Afridi	Chief Justice of Pakistan
6		Sikandar Sultan Raja	Chief Election Commissioner of Pakistan
7		16th National Assembly of Pakistan	National Assembly
8		16th Senate of Pakistan	Senate of Pakistan

=== Provincial government ===
Province	Governor	Chief Minister		Government Type	Chief Justice
Balochistan	Jaffar Khan Mandokhail (from 6 May 2024)	Sarfraz Bugti (from 2 March 2024)	PPP	Coalition	Rozi Khan Barrech (BHC)
Khyber Pakhtunkhwa	Faisal Karim Kundi (from 4 May 2024)	Sohail Afridi (from 15 October 2025)	PTI	Coalition (Note: The government is made up of PTI members and members who are de jure independents but are de facto members of the PTI.)	Syed Muhammad Attique Shah (PHC)
Punjab	Saleem Haider Khan (from 10 May 2024)	Maryam Nawaz (from 26 February 2024)	PML-N	Coalition	Aalia Neelum (LHC)
Sindh	Nehal Hashmi (from 13 March 2026)	Murad Ali Shah	PPP	Majority	Muhammad Junaid Ghaffar (SHC)

=== State government ===
Province	President	Prime minister		Government Type	Chief Justice
Gilgit-Baltistan	Mehdi Shah	Gulbar Khan (from 13 July 2023)	PTI	Coalition	Sardar Muhammad Shamim Khan (SACGB)
Azad Kashmir	Sultan Mehmood Chaudhry	Chaudhry Anwarul Haq (from 20 April 2023)	PTI	Coalition	Raja Saeed Akram Khan (SCAJK)

== Events ==
=== January ===
- 2 January – An anti-terrorism court in Islamabad sentences multiple journalists and social media personalities to life imprisonment on charges of inciting violence during the 2023 Pakistani protests.
- 5 January – Three people are arrested in Karachi on suspicion of plotting attacks for the Balochistan Liberation Army.
- 11 January – Eight people are killed in a gas cylinder explosion at a wedding in Islamabad.
- 12 January – Six police officers are killed in a bomb attack on their vehicle in Tank District, Khyber Pakhtunkhwa.
- 15 January – Twelve BLA militants are killed in an attack on a police station and two banks in Kharan District, Balochistan.
- 17 January –
  - A truck falls into a canal amid heavy fog in Sargodha, killing 14 people and injuring nine others.
  - A bus overturns along the Makran Coastal Highway in Balochistan, killing 10 people and injuring 36 others.
  - A fire erupts at the Gul Plaza mall in Karachi, killing at least 79 people.
- 19 January – A magnitude 6.0 earthquake hits Gilgit-Baltistan, killing one person and damaging 20 homes in Ghizer District.
- 23 January –
  - Nine people are killed in an avalanche in Chitral District, Khyber Pakhtunkhwa.
  - Seven people are killed in a suicide bombing at a wedding held at the residence of a community leader in Dera Ismail Khan District, Khyber Pakhtunkhwa.
- 24 January –
  - A fire erupts at a hotel in Lahore, killing at least three people.
  - A court in Islamabad sentences human rights lawyers Imaan Mazari and her husband, Hadi Ali Chattha, to 17 years' imprisonment on charges of using social media to malign the state and its security institutions.
- 29 January –
  - A woman and her child are found dead in a manhole in Lahore.
  - Forty-one militants are killed in military raids in Panjgur and Harnai Districts in Balochistan.
  - A series of attacks are carried out by militants affiliated with the BLA on multiple locations across Balochistan from 29 January to 5 February, leaving 36 civilians, 2 members of the security forces, and 216 of the militants/insurgents dead.

=== February ===
- 6 February –
  - At least 31 people are killed in a suicide bombing at a Shiite mosque in Islamabad.
  - The Basant festival is held in Punjab for the first time since 2005 following the lifting of a ban imposed for safety reasons.
- 11 February – Four police officers are killed in an ambush by militants on their vehicle in Dera Ismail Khan District, Khyber Pakhtunkhwa.
- 12 February – One person is killed in a bomb attack on a vehicle belonging to the Frontier Works Organization in Chilas.
- 13 February – A multi-vehicle collision on the M9 motorway in Gadap, Karachi, kills 13 people.
- 15 February – A bus crashes into a trailer in Khairpur District, Sindh, killing 11 people and injuring 10 others.
- 16 February –
  - Two people are killed in a motorcycle bombing near a police station in Bannu District, Khyber Pakhtunkhwa.
  - 2026 Bajaur attack: Twelve people are killed in a vehicle bombing near a checkpoint in Bajaur District, Khyber Pakhtunkhwa.
  - Three police officers and several militants are killed in clashes in Shangla District, Khyber Pakhtunkhwa.
- 17 February – Three Pakistani soldiers captured by Afghanistan during the 2025 Afghanistan–Pakistan conflict are released following mediation by Saudi Arabia.
- 18 February – Two officials are killed in a militant attack on a police station and a customs office in Dera Ismail Khan.
- 19 February – A three-story building collapses following a suspected gas explosion in Soldier Bazaar, Karachi, killing 16 people.
- 21 February – Two soldiers and five militants are killed in a motorcycle bombing on a military convoy in Bannu District, Khyber Pakhtunkhwa.
- 22 February – Pakistan carries out airstrikes on suspected militant camps in Afghanistan, killing 18 people.
- 23 February – Three people are killed in a drone attack and ambush on a paramilitary Frontier Corps outpost in Karak District, Khyber Pakhtunkhwa.
- 24 February –
  - Five police officers are killed in an ambush in Kohat District, Khyber Pakhtunkhwa.
  - Two police officers are killed in a suicide bombing near a checkpoint in Bhakkar District, Punjab.
- 25 February –
  - Three security personnel are killed in an attack on their vehicle by militants near Chaman.
  - Four police officers are killed in an attack on a patrol in Bajaur District, Khyber Pakhtunkhwa.
- 26 February – Afghanistan carries out attacks on Pakistani army posts and claims 40 Pakistani soldiers were killed, while Pakistani security sources claim 22 Taliban personnel dead and several quadcopters shot down.
- 27 February – Defense minister Khawaja Asif declares an "open war" against Afghanistan.

=== March ===
- 1 March –
  - At least 20 people are killed in nationwide protests against the assassination of Ali Khamenei.
  - Hundreds of protestors attempt to storm the consulate of the United States in Karachi, leading to clashes with security forces that leave at least nine people dead and multiple others wounded.
- 3 March – Pakistan says 67 Afghans and one Pakistani soldier had been killed in clashes along their border.
- 6 March – The United Nations High Commissioner for Refugees reports at least 100,000 civilians have been displaced from their homes due to the fighting between Afghanistan and Pakistan, while Afghan forces say they have destroyed 14 more Pakistani military outposts along the border and downed a drone.
- 7 March –
  - At least 10 people are killed and several others are critically injured in a suspected bombing at a filling station in Wana, South Waziristan District, Khyber Pakhtunkhwa.
  - At least four people are killed, including two policemen, and more than 35 others are injured, including three seriously, in two separate bombings targeting a police patrol van and a market in Wana and Lakki Marwat District, Khyber Pakhtunkhwa.
- 10 March – Pakistan holds its 5G spectrum auction, organised by the Pakistan Telecommunication Authority, raising about US$507 million after selling spectrum to telecom operators Jazz, Zong, and Ufone to support the rollout of 5G services in Pakistan.
- 15 March – Four people are killed in a suspected Afghan mortar attack in Bajaur District, Khyber Pakhtunkhwa.
- 16 March –
  - Eight people are killed in a roof collapse at a shop hosting payouts for government welfare schemes in Rahim Yar Khan District, Punjab.
  - Five soldiers are killed and several others are injured in a roadside bombing in Duki District, Balochistan.
  - At least 100 people are killed in a suspected Pakistani airstrike on a drug rehabilitation clinic in Kabul.
- 18 March –
  - At least 18 people are killed due to a thunderstorm in Karachi.
  - 2026 Afghanistan–Pakistan conflict: Afghanistan and Pakistan declare a ceasefire lasting until 23 March.
- 26 March –
  - Middle East special envoy Steve Witkoff confirms that the United States has shared a 15-point peace plan to Iran through the Pakistani government. Pakistani foreign Minister Ishaq Dar confirms that indirect negotiations between the United States and Iran are taking place.
  - Start of the 2026 Pakistan Super League
- 31 March – Ali Zafar vs. Meesha Shafi: A Lahore court rules in favour of Zafar and orders Shafi to pay damages, in a defamation suit filed in 2018.

=== April ===
- 2 April – At least five people are killed due to a thunderstorm in Karachi.
- 3 April –
  - The government introduces free public transport in Islamabad and Punjab for one month and provides targeted subsidies in other regions to offset the impact of recent fuel price increases.
  - Five people are killed while 13 others are injured in a suicide bombing in Bannu District, Khyber Pakhtunkhwa.
- 6 April – Pakistan proposes a ceasefire plan received by Iran and the United States, reportedly dubbed the Islamabad Accord, which calls for an immediate halt to hostilities, the reopening of the Strait of Hormuz, and a 15–20 day period of negotiations between Iran and the U.S. This comes following reported talks between Pakistani army chief Asim Munir, U.S. vice president JD Vance, U.S. special envoy Steve Witkoff, and Iranian foreign minister Abbas Araghchi. The Pakistani foreign ministry says that talks between Iran and the U.S. are ongoing.
- 12 April –
  - JD Vance announces that the talks between the US and Iran had failed, as he was unable to reach an agreement after a day of negotiations.
  - Three Pakistan Coast Guard personnel are killed in an ambush by the Balochistan Liberation Army on a patrol boat in the Arabian Sea near Gwadar.
- 16 April – A gas pipeline explodes and sets several residential buildings on fire in Haripur, Khyber Pakhtunkhwa, killing eight people.
- 23 April – Nine people are killed in an attack on a mining site in Chagai.

=== May ===
- 3 May – 2026 Pakistan Super League final: Peshawar Zalmi wins the tournament.
- 9 May – At least three police officers are killed in a suicide bombing and shooting in Bannu District, Khyber Pakhtunkhwa.
- 10 May – At least 12 police officers are killed and five are wounded in a car bombing in Fateh Khel in Bannu District, Khyber Pakhtunkhwa.
- 12 May – Nine people including two police officers, are killed in a rickshaw bombing on a bazaar in Lakki Marwat, Khyber Pakhtunkhwa.
- 13 May – Five soldiers and seven militants are killed in clashes with the BLA in Barkhan District, Balochistan.
- 18 May –
  - Two police officers escorting polio vaccination workers are killed in separate ambushes in Bajaur District, Khyber Pakhtunkhwa.
  - Three people are killed in a bomb attack on a market in Wana, South Waziristan.
- 19 May – Umar Hayat is sentenced to death for the murder of Sana Yousaf in 2025.
- 24 May – At least 30 people are killed and 100 injured in a suicide bombing on a train transporting military personnel in Quetta. The Balochistan Liberation Army claims responsibility.
- 25 May – A minibus collides with a parked bus near Mardan, Khyber Pakhtunkhwa, killing 17 people and injuring five.
- 26 May – A magnitude 4.6 earthquake hits Malakwal, killing one person and injuring 11 others.

=== June ===
- 7 June – Seven people are killed in clashes between police and supporters of the Joint Awami Action Committee (JAAC) in Rawalakot, Azad Kashmir.
- 9 June – A strike is carried out across Azad Kashmir following a call from the JAAC in protest against overrepresentation of refugees from Indian-controlled Kashmir in the Azad Kashmir Legislative Assembly.
- 10 June –
  - 2026 Pakistan Army Mil Mi-17 crash: An Mi-17 transport helicopter of the Pakistan Army crashes near Muzaffarabad, killing all 22 people on board.
  - A van plunges into a ravine and catches fire near Khajut, Punjab, killing 10 people and injuring 13 others.
- 11 June – Fifteen people are killed in clashes between police and JAAC supporters in Azad Kashmir.
- 15 June – A PAC MFI-17 Mushshak of the Pakistan Air Force crashes near Mardan, Khyber Pakhtunkhwa, killing both pilots.
- 20 June – Seven people are killed in two successive roadside bomb attacks in Bannu District, Khyber Pakhtunkhwa.
- 23 June – Human rights activist Mahrang Baloch is sentenced to life imprisonment by an court in Quetta on charges of murder and terrorism involving the killing of a Federal Constabulary official during a protest in Gwadar in 2024.
- 26 June – A magnitude 5.2 earthquake hits Balochistan, injuring 20 people.
- 27 June –
  - A magnitude 5.4 earthquake hits Balochistan, injuring 20 people.
  - Three Sindh Rangers personnel and six militants are killed in an attack on their headquarters in Karachi claimed by Jamaat-ul-Ahrar.
- 28 June – Pakistan launches airstrikes in eastern Afghanistan in retaliation for the attack on Karachi the previous day.
- 30 June – Fourteen children are killed and at least eight others are injured after the roof of a private tuition centre collapses in the Kahna area of Lahore.

=== July ===
- 3 July – At least 40 people are killed when an overloaded bus crashes into a ravine in Zhob District, Balochistan.
- 4–8 July – At least 42 people, including 38 security personnel and four civilians, are killed in a series of attacks by militants across Balochistan. The Pakistani military claimed 54 militants were killed in these attacks.
- 7 July – A Boeing 737 aircraft operated by K2 Airways as K2 Airways Flight 1732 crashes into the Arabian Sea off Ormara, leaving its five crew missing.
- 24 July –
  - Twenty-seven people, including 15 security personnel are killed in a suicide car bombing carried out by the Pakistani Taliban in Tank District. The Pakistani military claims 12 militants were killed in the attack.
  - The United States imposes a 10% tariff on Pakistani exports, citing the presence of alleged forced labour in the supply chain.
- 27 July–10 August – 2026 Azad Kashmiri general election
- 30 July – Four climbers are killed while six others are reported missing following an avalanche on Broad Peak in Gilgit-Baltistan.
- 31 July –
  - At least 34 miners are killed in a methane gas explosion at a coal mine near Quetta.
  - Entrepreneur and Wafflix founder Mir Raza Ali Khan is abducted after leaving his home and is found dead in Gulistan-e-Johar, Karachi.

=== August ===
- 2 August – At least 14 people are killed in a suicide bombing at an antimilitant rally in Kabal Tehsil, Khyber Pakhtunhkwa.
- 7 August – Saudi Arabia, Pakistan, and Turkey sign a joint defense agreement.
- 21 August – The Pakistan Army kills 49 militants in Khyber Pakhtunhkwa and Balochistan during multiple operations.
- 26 August – At least 14 infants are killed in a fire at the maternity ward of the Pakistan Institute of Medical Sciences in Islamabad.
- 28 August – Pakistan and Kuwait sign a new defense accord.

=== September ===
- 3 September – Security forces kill 15 militants trying to cross the border from Afghanistan.
- 8 September – A military drone strikes a suspected hideout of Balochistan militants.
- 15 September – A Pakistan Navy vessel collides with an Indian Navy vessel in the Arabian Sea, prompting diplomatic protests between both countries.
- 16 September – An MOU is signed with the Pakistan army by US drone maker Powerus, which is set to merge with a firm backed by US President Donald Trump’s sons.
- 16–17 September – The Pakistan-China Boundary Joint Commission is formally inaugurated in Islamabad.
- 18–19 September – At least 31 people, including 17 police personnel are killed in a terrorist attack on a police facility in Kohat.
- 20 September – Aleema Khanum, the sister of former prime minister Imran Khan, is arrested on suspicion of plotting to mobilise his supporters amid planned protests.
- 21 September – The Pakistani military launches air strikes on Afghanistan in retaliation for the Kohat attack.
- 24 September – The Pakistani military launches air strikes on Afghanistan in retaliation for the Kohat attack.
- 26 September – Eleven people are killed in an bomb attack in Dera Ismail Khan claimed by the TTP.

=== October ===
- 1 October – Pakistan launches air strikes on what is described as "terrorist camps" in Afghanistan.
- 11 October – The federal government imposes a state of emergency in Khyber Pakhtunkhwa and removes the PTI-led provincial government in favour of governor's rule, accusing it of failing to combat insurgency.
- 12 October – A PAC MFI-17 Mushshak trainer aircraft of the Pakistan Army crashes near Nawan Killi, Quetta, killing the two pilots on board.
- 13 October – A passenger train derails in Sher Shah, Multan, killing five people and injuring 35 others.
- 15 October – The roof of a private school collapses in Peshawar, killing at least 35 people and injuring more than 50.
- 17 October –
  - Pakistan and the Afghan Taliban exchange fire following an attempt by TTP militants to infiltrate into the country.
  - A magnitude 5.7 earthquake hits Balochistan, killing one person.
- 20 October – A bus crashes into a road divider before overturning in Punjab, killing 11 passengers and injuring 30.
- 21 October – Indonesia, Pakistan, Turkey, and Qatar sign the Badr defense agreement.
- 23 October – A bus collides with a minibus along the N-25 National Highway in Balochistan, killing 12 people and injuring over 20.
- 29 October – An oxygen cylinder explodes inside an ambulance parked at a medical facility in Tharparkar, Sindh, killing 10 people.
- 30 October – A court sentences human rights lawyers Imaan Mazari and her husband, Hadi Ali Chattha, to 10 years' imprisonment on charges of removing road barriers and obstructing police officers in violation of anti-terrorism laws.

=== November ===
- 5 November – A passenger bus collides with a truck in Pakpattan District, Punjab, killing 11 people and injuring 33 others.
- 12 November – A passenger van plunges off a road in Gilgit-Baltistan, killing 11 people and injuring three more.

== Holidays ==
- 5 February – Kashmir Solidarity Day
- 23 March – Pakistan Day
- 20–21 March – Eid al-Fitr (Note: Subject to the moon's appearance)
- 1 May – Labour Day
- 26–28 May – Eid al-Azha
- 25–26 June – Ashura
- 14 August – Independence Day
- 25 August – Mawlid
- 9 November – Iqbal Day
- 25 December – Quaid-e-Azam Day

== Deaths ==
- 5 January – Maulana Fazl-ur-Raheem Ashrafi, 81, Islamic scholar, patron of Wifaq-ul-Madaris al-Arabia.
- 22 January – Jamshed Khan, politician.
- 31 January – Sultan Mehmood Chaudhry, 71, president (since 2021) and prime minister (1996–2001) of Azad Kashmir.
- 11 March – Niaz Ahmed Jhakkar, politician.
- 8 April – Ali Hussain Khan, 70, Punjab MPA (since 2024).
- 9 April – Zulfiqar Ali Khosa, 90, governor of Punjab (1999) and senator (2012–2018).
- 5 May – Shaikh Idrees, 64, Islamic scholar, Khyber Pakhtunkhwa MPA (2002–2007).
- 15 May – Malik Nadeem Kamran, 72, Punjab MPA (1997–1999, 2008–2023).
- 12 June – Taj Muhammad Afridi, 56, senator (2015–2021).
- 1 August – Malik Muhammad Iqbal Channar, 76, MNA (since 2024).
- 23 August – Imran Ullah Khan, 93, army general, Governor of Balochistan (1994–1997).
- 11 September –
  - Chaudhry Mehmood Bashir, 88, minister for law (2018) and MNA (1997–1999, since 2008).
  - Naseebullah Bazai, senator (2018–2024).
- 17 September – Chaudhry Muhammad Hanif, 62, Punjab MPA (2008–2018, since 2025).
- 5 October – George Ali Murad Khan, 93, monarch, Mir of Khairpur (1947–1954).
- 26 October – Abdul Waheed Kakar, 89, chief of the army staff (1993–1996).
- 7 November – Raja Muhammad Zulqarnain Khan, 90, president of Azad Kashmir (2006–2011).

== See also ==
=== Country overviews ===
- Pakistan
- Economy of Pakistan
- Government of Pakistan
- History of Pakistan
- History of modern Pakistan
- Outline of Pakistan
- Politics of Pakistan
- Years in Pakistan
- Media of Pakistan

=== Related timelines for current period ===
- 2026
- 2020s
- 21st century
