= 2027 in Pakistan =

- Decades: 2000s; 2010s; 2020s
- See also: History of Pakistan; List of years in Pakistan; Timeline of Pakistani history

The events listed below are both anticipated and scheduled for the year 2027 in Pakistan.

The year 2027 will be the 80th year of the independence of Pakistan.

== Events ==
=== Predicted and scheduled ===
- 23–31 March – 2027 South Asian Games

== Holidays ==
- 5 February – Kashmir Solidarity Day
- 10–12 March – Eid al-Fitr (Note: Subject to the moon's appearance)
- 23 March – Pakistan Day
- 1 May – Labour Day
- 17–18 May – Eid al-Azha
- 14–15 June – Ashura
- 14 August – Independence Day
- 15 August – Mawlid
- 9 November – Iqbal Day
- 25 December – Quaid-e-Azam Day

== See also ==
=== Country overviews ===
- Pakistan
- Economy of Pakistan
- Government of Pakistan
- History of Pakistan
- History of modern Pakistan
- Outline of Pakistan
- Politics of Pakistan
- Years in Pakistan
- Media of Pakistan

=== Related timelines for current period ===
- 2027
- 2020s
- 21st century
