= National symbols of Pakistan =

Pakistan has several official national symbols, including a flag, an emblem, an anthem, a memorial tower as well as several national heroes. The symbols were adopted at various stages in the existence of Pakistan and there are various rules and regulations governing their definition or use. The oldest symbol is the Lahore Resolution, adopted by the All India Muslim League on 23 March 1940, and which presented the official demand for the creation of a separate country for the Muslims of India. The Minar-e-Pakistan memorial tower which was built in 1968 on the site where the Lahore Resolution was passed. The national flag was adopted just before independence was achieved on 14 August 1947. The national anthem and the state emblem were each adopted in 1954. There are also several other symbols including the national animal, bird, flower and tree.

== Minar-e-Pakistan ==
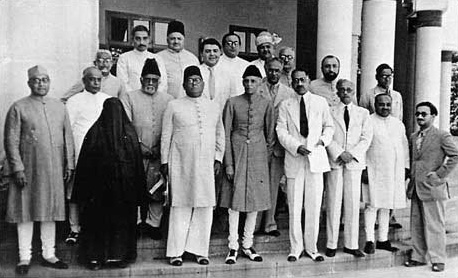
The Muslim League Working Committee in Lahore, 1940

The Lahore Resolution (Qarardad-e-Lahore) (Urdu: قرارداد لاھور), also known as the Pakistan Resolution, was a formal political statement adopted by the All India Muslim League at the occasion of its three-day general session on 22–24 March 1940 at Minto Park (now Iqbal Park), Lahore. The resolution called for greater Muslim autonomy in British India and has been largely interpreted as a demand for a separate Muslim state. The idea of separate state for Indian Muslims was first suggested by Muhammad Iqbal in 1930 and the name of Pakistan was proposed by Choudhary Rahmat Ali in his Pakistan Declaration pamphlet in 1933. Initially, Muhammad Ali Jinnah and other leaders were in favour of Hindu-Muslim unity, but the volatile political climate and religious hostilities of the 1930s made the idea more appealing. In his speech, Jinnah criticised the Indian National Congress and the nationalist Muslims, and espoused the Two-Nation Theory and the reasons for the demand for separate Muslim homelands. Sir Sikandar Hayat Khan, the Chief Minister of the Punjab, drafted the original resolution, but that was not fully acceptable to all the Working Committee, so extensive redrafting followed, by the Subject Committee of the Muslim League. The text is ambiguous in accepting the concept of various Muslim 'zones' within a "United India" due to communal concerns and it does not clearly recommend the creation of a separate, fully independent Muslim state. The resolution was moved in the general session by A.K. Fazlul Huq, Chief Minister of Bengal and was supported seconded by several leaders. The principle text of the Lahore Resolution was passed on 24 March 1940. In 1941 it became part of the Muslim League's constitution. By 1946, it formed the basis for the struggle of the Muslim League for a separate Muslim state. The statement declared:

No constitutional plan would be workable or acceptable to the Muslims unless geographical contiguous units are demarcated into regions which should be so constituted with such territorial readjustments as may be necessary. That the areas in which the Muslims are numerically in majority as in the North-Western and Eastern zones of India should be grouped to constitute independent states in which the constituent units shall be autonomous and sovereign … That adequate, effective and mandatory safeguards shall be specifically provided in the constitution for minorities in the units and in the regions for the protection of their religious, cultural, economic, political, administrative and other rights of the minorities, with their consultation. Arrangements thus should be made for the security of Muslims where they were in a minority.

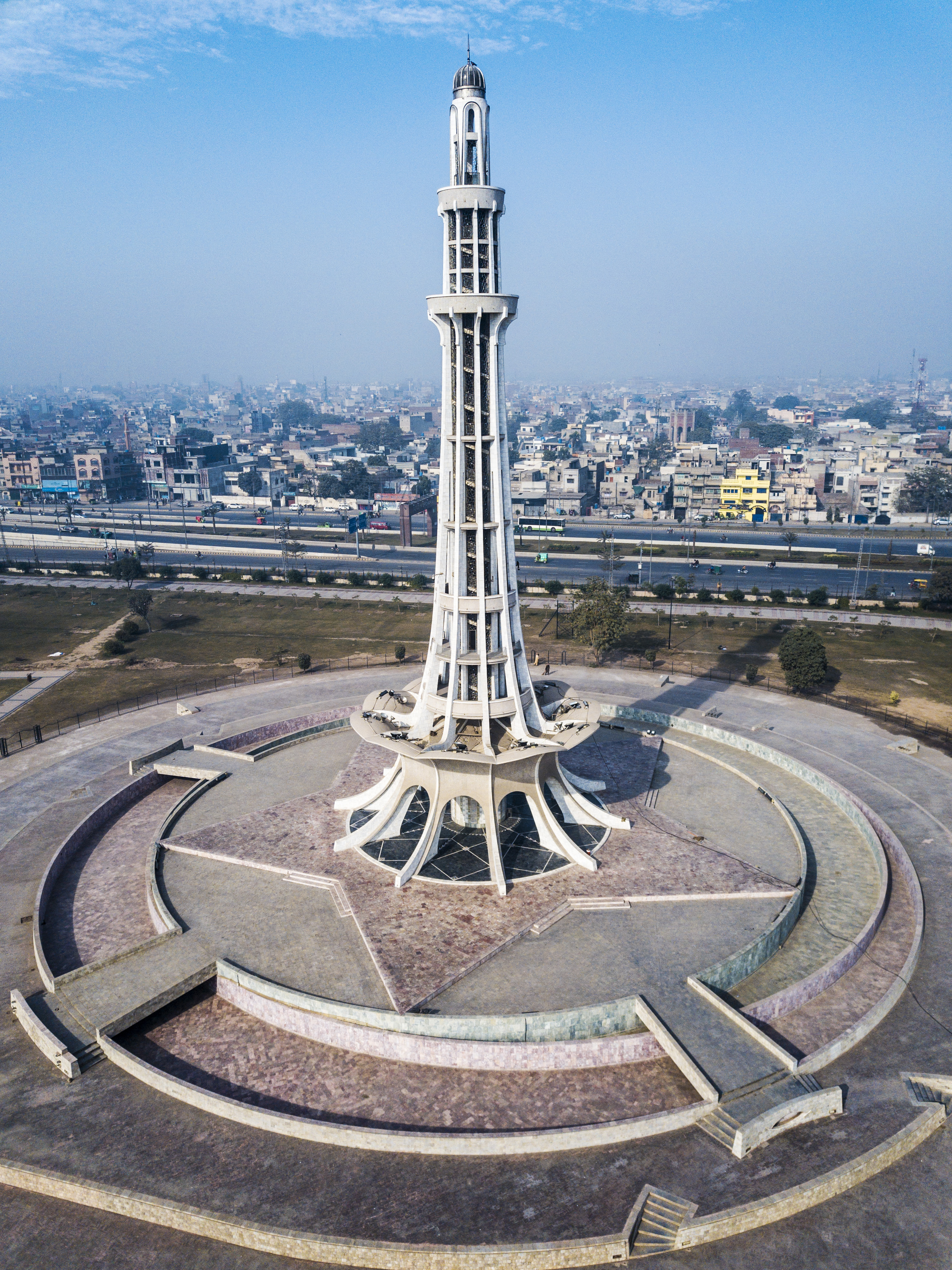
The Minar-e-Pakistan

The Minar-e-Pakistan (Urdu: مينارِ پاكستان; Mīnār-ĕ Pākistān) which is the national tower of Pakistan also known as Tower of Pakistan is a 60 metre tall concrete minaret in Iqbal Park in Lahore. The Minar was built on the site where the Muslim League passed the Lahore Resolution, demanding the creation of Pakistan. Pakistan now celebrates this day as a national holiday each year under the name of Pakistan Day which is also the day in 1956 when the country became the first Islamic Republic in the world. It was designed by Muhammad Wali Ullah Khan and built by Mian Abdul Khaliq Company. The base of the tower is raised about 4 metres from the ground. The next 13 metres form a sculpted, flower-like base and from this point, the Minar tapers as it rises. The base platform is shaped like a five-pointed star and it encloses crescent-shaped pools. It is constructed of reinforced concrete, with the floors and walls rendered in stone and marble.

== National flag ==
The National Flag

The national flag was designed by Muhammad Ali Jinnah, the founder of Pakistan, and was based on the original flag of the Muslim League. It was adopted by the Constituent Assembly on 11 August 1947, just days before independence. The flag is referred to in the national anthem as Parcham-e-Sitāra-o-Hilāl in Urdu (lit. Flag of the Crescent and Star). The flag comprises a dark green field, representing the Muslim majority of Pakistan, with a vertical white stripe in the hoist, representing religious minorities. In the centre is a white crescent moon, representing progress, and a white five-pointed star, representing light and knowledge. The flag symbolizes Pakistan's commitment to Islam, the Islamic world and the rights of religious minorities. The flag is flown on several important days of the year including Republic Day and Independence Day. The flag is also flown on the residences and motor vehicles of many public officials including the President and the Prime Minister.

== National anthem ==
The national anthem of Pakistan or Qaumī Tarāna (Urdu: قومى ترانہ), is played during any event involving the hoisting of the flag, for example Resolutions Day (23 March) and Independence Day (14 August). The Constituent Assembly had not adopted a national anthem by the time Pakistan became independent, so when the flag was hoisted at the independence ceremony it was accompanied by the song, "Pakistan Zindabad, Azadi Paendabad". Muhammad Ali Jinnah asked a Lahore-based Hindu writer, Jagan Nath Azad, to write a national anthem for Pakistan. Jinnah may have done this to promote a more secular idealism for Pakistan. The anthem written by Azad was quickly approved by Jinnah, and it was played on Radio Pakistan. Azad's work remained as Pakistan's national anthem for about eighteen months.

A National Anthem Committee was formed in 1948, but it had difficulty finding suitable music and lyrics. The impending state visit of the Shah of Iran in 1950, resulted in the hasty adoption of a three stanza composition by Ahmed Ghulamali Chagla. Initially it was performed without lyrics for the Prime Minister Liaquat Ali Khan on 10 August 1950 and was approved for playing during the visit of the Shah. However, the anthem was not officially adopted until August 1954. The National Anthem Committee eventually approved lyrics written by Abu-Al-Asar Hafeez Jullandhuri and the new national anthem was first played properly on Radio Pakistan on 13 August 1954. Official approval was announced by the Ministry of Information and Broadcasting on 16 August 1954 followed by a performance of the national anthem in 1955 involving eleven major singers of Pakistan including Ahmad Rushdi.

== State emblem ==
The State Emblem

The State Emblem was adopted in 1954 and symbolizes Pakistan's ideological foundation, the basis of its economy, its cultural heritage and its guiding principles. The four components of the emblem are a crescent and star crest above a shield, which is surrounded by a wreath, below which is a scroll. The crest and the green colour of the emblem are traditional symbols of Islam. The quartered shield in the centre shows cotton, wheat, tea and jute, which were the major crops of Pakistan at independence and signify the agricultural base of the economy. The floral wreath, surrounding the shield, represents the floral designs used in traditional Mughal art and emphasizes the cultural heritage of Pakistan.

== Motto ==
The scroll supporting the shield contains Muhammad Ali Jinnah's motto in Urdu, which reads from right to left: (ایمان ، اتحاد ، نظم و ضبط) "Iman, Ittehad, Nazm o Zabt" translated as "Faith, Unity, Discipline" and are intended as the guiding principles for Pakistan.

== List of other national symbols ==
Title	Symbol	Image	Notes
Father of the Nation (Quaid-e-Azam)	Muhammad Ali Jinnah		Muhammad Ali Jinnah (born Mahomedali Jinnahbhai; 25 December 1876 – 11 September 1948) was a barrister, politician and the founder of Pakistan. Jinnah served as the leader of the All-India Muslim League from 1913 until the inception of Pakistan on 14 August 1947, and then as the Dominion of Pakistan's first Governor-General until his death. He is revered in Pakistan as the Quaid-i-Azam ("Great Leader") and Baba-i-Qaum ("Father of the Nation"). As the first Governor-General of Pakistan, Jinnah worked to establish the new nation's government and policies, and to aid the millions of Muslim migrants who had emigrated from neighbouring India to Pakistan after the two states' independence
Mother of the Nation (Madar-i-Millat)	Fatimah Jinnah		Fatima Jinnah widely known as Māder-e Millat ("Mother of the Nation"), was a Pakistani politician, dental surgeon, stateswoman, and one of the leading founders of Pakistan. She was the younger sister of Muhammad Ali Jinnah, the founder and the first Governor General of Pakistan. then-President of Pakistan. Her legacy is associated with her support for civil rights, her struggle in the Pakistan Movement and her devotion to her brother. Referred to as Māder-e Millat ("Mother of the Nation") and Khātūn-e Pākistān ("Lady of Pakistan"), many institutions and public spaces in Pakistan have been named in her honour.
National poet	Muhammad Iqbal		Sir Muhammad Iqbal was a South Asian Muslim writer, philosopher, and politician, whose poetry in the Urdu language is among the greatest of the twentieth century. Iqbal is widely commemorated in Pakistan, where he is regarded as the ideological founder of the state. His birthday is annually commemorated in Pakistan as Iqbal Day, and until 2018 it was also a public holiday.
State religion	Islam		Islam in Pakistan existed in communities along the Arab coastal trade routes in Sindh as soon as the religion originated and had gained early acceptance in the Arabian Peninsula. The connection between the Sind and Islam was established by the initial Muslim missions during the Rashidun Caliphate. The mosque is an important religious as well as social institution in Pakistan. Many rituals and ceremonies are celebrated according to Islamic calendar. Pakistan was created as a separate state for Indian Muslims in British India in 1947, and followed the parliamentary form of democracy. In 1949, the first Constituent Assembly of Pakistan passed the Objectives Resolution which envisaged an official role for Islam as the state religion to make sure any future law should not violate its basic teachings. In 1956, the elected parliament formally adopted the name Islamic Republic of Pakistan, declaring Islam as the official religion.
National language (lingua franca)	Urdu		Urdu is an Indo-Aryan language spoken chiefly in South Asia. It is the official national language and lingua franca of Pakistan. Urdu is the sole national, and one of the two official languages of Pakistan (along with English). It is spoken and understood throughout the country. Its official status has meant that Urdu is understood and spoken widely throughout Pakistan as a second or third language. It is used in education, literature, office and court business.
National flower	Common jasmine		In Pakistan, jasmine is a very common plant and one can find it in any garden. Because of its attractive scent, the white jasmine symbolizes attachment and represents amiability and modesty; therefore, jasmine was named the national flower of Pakistan.
National tree	Himalayan cedar (Deodar)		Cedrus deodara is a species of cedar native to the western Himalayan and the Hindu Kush ranges in northern Pakistan (especially in Khyber Pakhtunkhwa). It is considered to be the national tree of Pakistan.
National fruit	Mango		Mango is highly cultivated in Pakistan (especially in the Punjab and Sindh provinces). Some of the most popular cities for their production include: Multan, Bahawalpur, Muzaffargarh, Khanewal, Sahiwal, Sadiqabad, Vehari, and Rahim Yar Khan. Mirpur Khas, Hyderabad and Thatta. Dera Ismail Khan, Peshawar and Mardan.
National vegetable	Lady Finger		
National animal	Markhor		The Markhor is the national animal of Pakistan. The Markhor is the largest of the goat family and is commonly found in the Northern Areas of Pakistan. The name Markhor translates to “snake eater” in Persian, for the Markhor holds great skill at killing snakes in the wild to protect its harem. Despite their large size, Markhors are extremely skilled climbers. Conservation efforts from wildlife NGOs like Save Our Species and WCS Pakistan were then put into action. Thanks to these initiatives, the majestic mammal gradually began to rebound.
National mammal	Indus river dolphin		
National predator	Snow leopard		
National bird	Chukar partridge		The national bird of Pakistan is Chukar partridge. They are commonly known as Chakor and it is a Eurasian upland game bird in the pheasant family Phasianidae. The chukar sometimes symbolizes intense, and often unrequited, love. It is said to be in love with the moon and to gaze at it constantly. Because of their pugnacious behaviour during the breeding season they are kept in some areas as fighting birds. In short, Chukar partridge have a huge reason to be the National bird symbol of Pakistan.
State bird	Shaheen falcon		The Shaheen falcon is actually a symbolic icon of the Pakistani Air Force and is considered by many to be the state bird.
National fish	Mahseer (Himalayan golden mahseer)		
National reptile	Mugger crocodile		
National sport	Field hockey		Field Martial Ayub Khan's arrival in 1958 proved to be not only one of the most significant determining factors behind declaring hockey as this new nation's national sport but also brought in a new wave of enthusiasm for the sport as he emphasized on it more than football or cricket.
National mosque	Faisal Mosque		The Faisal Mosque was conceived as the National Mosque of Pakistan and named after the late King Faisal bin Abdul-Aziz of Saudi Arabia, who supported and financed the project. It was completed in 1986. The largest mosque in Pakistan, the Faisal Mosque was the largest mosque in the world from 1986 until 1993.
National tower	Minar-e-Pakistan (Minaret of Pakistan)		This tower marks Pakistan’s resolution (Lahore Resolution) that marked the first step in the history of creation of Pakistan. Its construction began in 1960, and finished in 8 years to be completed in October 1968. This national monument draws its three steps symptomatic of the three stages of the challenges and successes in the independence of Pakistan. The floral inscriptions at the base of this Minar shows the text of the Pakistan Resolution that solidified Iqbal’s dreams and Jinnah’s struggle.
National monument	Pakistan Monument		This national monument, consisting of four large petals and three small petals, is symbolic of the four provinces (Punjab, Sindh, Khyber Pakhtunkwa, Balochistan) and AJK, Gilgit-Baltistan, and FATA. The blossoming flower as a whole is also a bode and prayer to a progressing Pakistan. The inner walls of these granite petals are decorated with murals, that are primarily based on Islamic art. This monument is a symbol and reminder of the history and heritage of Pakistan, the sacrifices that went into its creation, and the culture that makes it Pakistan.
National days	Pakistan Day; Independence Day		Pakistan Day or Pakistan Resolution Day, also Republic Day, is a national holiday in Pakistan commemorating the Lahore Resolution passed on 23 March 1940 and the adoption of the first constitution of Pakistan. Independence Day is observed annually on 14 August, is a national holiday in Pakistan. It commemorates the day when Pakistan achieved independence and was declared a sovereign state following the end of the British Raj in 1947.
National clothing	Shalwar kameez		Shalwar kameez is the national clothing of Pakistan worn by both men and women. The clothing is worn in all provinces of Pakistan. Every province may have its own special intricate pattern or design that may be available as well.
National mountain	K2		K2 Also known as Mount Godwin-Austen or Chhogori Consider As The National Mountain of Pakistan. It is the Second Highest Mountain in the World and the highest in Pakistan. It's located on the Pak-China border in the Pakistani administrated region of Gilgit Baltistan.
National mausoleum	Mazar-e-Quaid		Mazar-e-Quaid, also known as Jinnah Mausoleum or the National Mausoleum, is the final resting place of Quaid-e-Azam ("Great Leader") Muhammad Ali Jinnah, the founder of Pakistan.
National airline	PIA		PIA is the national airline of Pakistan operating in all provinces of Pakistan along with Gilgit Baltistan and Azad Kashmir.
National drink	Sugarcane juice		
National instrument	Daf		Daf is commonly known as the national instrument of Pakistan.
National currency	Pakistani Rupee (PKR)		The Pakistani rupee has been the official currency of Pakistan since 1948. The coins and notes are issued and controlled by the central bank, namely State Bank of Pakistan.
National river	Indus River		Indus River is the national river of Pakistan. Indus River is the largest river in Pakistan. The river has two principle tributaries in Pakistan, the Kabul river, and the Panjnad river—which in turn is formed by successive confluences of the five Punjab rivers, of which four: Jhelum, Chenab, Ravi, and Sutlej flow through Pakistan.
National colours	Green and white		
National coat of arms	Coat of Arms of Pakistan		
National archives	National Archives of Pakistan		The National Archives of Pakistan is a body established by the Government of Pakistan for the purpose of preserving and making available public and private records which have bearings on the history, culture and heritage of Pakistan.
National library	National Library of Pakistan		The National Library of Pakistan is the national and the research library located in the vicinity of the Islamabad.
National museum	National Museum of Pakistan		The National Museum of Pakistan is the national collection of history located in Karachi.
