= World Urdu Day =

Annual observance on 9 November

- Official name: World Urdu Day
- Observed by: Pakistan and India
- Type: International
- Date: 9 November
- Duration: 1 Day
- Frequency: Annual
- Related to: Iqbal Day

World Urdu Day ( Urdu :عالمی‌یومِ‌اردو) is celebrated all over the world on the birth day of famous Urdu poet Dr. Allama Muhammad Iqbal On 9 November.

The purpose of celebrating this day is to highlight the popularity of Urdu language and to appreciate its importance. Urdu is one of the most important languages spoken in the Indian subcontinent. It is also the national language of Pakistan.

== Allama Muhammad Iqbal ==
This day is celebrated all over the world on the occasion of Allama Muhammad Iqbal's birthday.

Allama Iqbal was a great Urdu poet and thinker. He breathed new life into the youth of the subcontinent through his self-concept. Iqbal reminded the Muslim Ummah of its glorious past and taught them to reunite.

== Celebrations ==
On this day, prestigious ceremonies are held in all prominent institutions of Pakistan and India to highlight the importance of Urdu and to pay homage to Iqbal.

== See also ==
- Iqbal Day
- UN English Day
- Hindi Day
