= Hindi Day =

Holiday in India (14 September)

Hindi Diwas
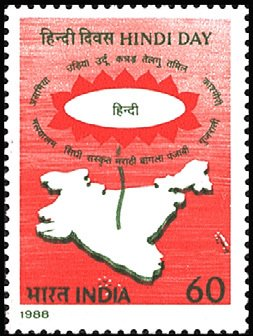
- 1988 Indian stamp.
- Official name: Hindi Diwas
- Observances: Commemoration of luminaries in the field of Hindi literature
- Date: 14 September
- Next time: 14 September 2026
- Frequency: Annual
- Related to: World Hindi Day (10 January)

Hindi Day (Hindi: हिन्दी दिवस, romanized: Hindī Divas) is observed in India on 14 September each year. It commemorates the adoption of Hindi as one of the official languages of the Republic of India. The date marks the consensus reached in 1949 during the drafting of the Constitution of India, when the Constituent Assembly decided on the official language framework for the nation.

== History ==
The Constituent Assembly of India debated the issue of national language for nearly three years. On 14 September 1949, a compromise reached during the drafting of the Constitution of India on the languages that were to have official status in the Republic of India. The compromise, usually called the Munshi-Ayyangar formula, after drafting committee members K. M. Munshi and N. Gopalaswami Ayyangar, was voted by the Constituent Assembly of India after three years of debate between two opposing camps. The Hindi protagonists wanted the Hindi language in the Devanagari script to be the sole "national language" of India (replacing Hindustani and Urdu written in Perso-Arabic script); the delegates from South India preferred English to have a place in the Constitution. The Munshi-Ayyangar formula declared (i) Hindi to be the "official language" of India's federal government; (ii) English to be an associate official language for 15 years during which Hindi's formal lexicon would be developed; and (iii) the international form of the Hindu–Arabic numerals to be the official numerals. The compromise resolution became articles 343–351 of India's constitution, which came into effect on 26 January 1950. In 1965, when the 15 years were up, the Government of India announced that English would continue to be the "de facto formal language of India."

== Events ==
Apart from local-level events in schools and other institutions, a few of the notable events include

- The former President of India, Pranab Mukherjee had conferred awards in different categories for the excellence in different fields pertaining to Hindi at a function in Vigyan Bhavan in New Delhi.
- Rajbhasha Awards were conferred upon the Ministries, Departments, PSUs and Nationalised Banks.

Ministry of Home Affairs in its order dated 25 March 2015 has changed name of two awards given annually on Hindi Divas. 'Indira Gandhi Rajbhasha Puraskar' instituted in 1986 changed to 'Rajbhasha Kirti Puraskar' and 'Rajiv Gandhi Rashtriya Gyan-Vigyan Maulik Pustak Lekhan Puraskar' changed to "Rajbhasha Gaurav Puraskar".

== See also ==
- World Hindi Conference
- World Hindi Secretariat
- International Mother Language Day
- UN English Day
- World Urdu Day
