= Akmal Lewaney =

Pakistani poet (1948–2024)

Akmal Lewane
- Born: 1946; Shamozai, Mardan District, Pakistan
- Died: 9 May 2024 (aged 78)
- Occupation: Poet
- Known for: Pashto literature, Nationalist poetry, Humorist poetry

Akmal Lewaney (1946 – 9 May 2024), known by his pen name Lewaney, was a Pashto language poet. He was born in 1946 in the village of Shamozai, Mardan District. Lewaney's education was limited to the second grade, but this did not hinder his literary journey. He started his career in poetry at the age of 15 with his first book of poetry "Yao So Gallona". Over the years, he wrote several notable works including "Lewantob", "Chapawoona", "Ajeeba Paigham", and "Tortam". Lewani was not only a poet but also an important part of the Pashto literature and national movement, known for his unique style of expression, witty humor and efforts to promote book culture through his mobile stalls. He left a rich legacy in Pashto literature.

== Early life and education ==
Lewaney was born in 1946 in the village of Shamozai, Mardan. He attended school up to the second grade and learned to read and write but could not continue his education as he had to work in the fields with his parents.

== Career ==
Lewaney was associated with Tehreek Khudai Khidmatgar of Bacha Khan. He was 15 years old when he wrote his first book of poetry "Yao So Galuna". His books of poetry include Lewantob, Chapawoona, Ajeeba Paigham and Tortam. He used to set up a stall to sell books at any literary or cultural event and earn enough profit to feed his family.

=== Contributions to Pashto literature ===
Akmal Lewane was known for his unique style of expression and his witty humor. He was an important part of Pashto literature and national movement. He was promoting book culture through his mobile stalls. He was a symbol of humor and nationalism.

== Bibliography ==
- Tortam
- Ajeeba Paigham
- Chapawuna Lewantob

== Death ==
Akmal Lewane died at the age of 78 on 9 May 2024 after a prolonged illness.
