= Youm-e-Takbir =

National holiday in Pakistan

Youm-e-Takbir یومِ تکبیر
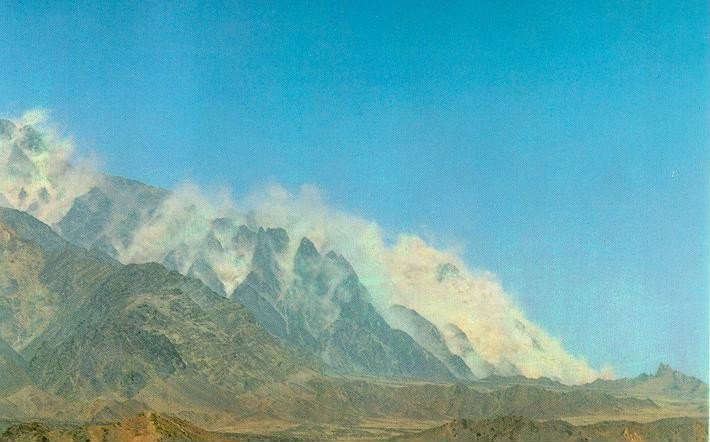
- Chagai-I atomic test
- Observed by: Pakistan
- Type: National
- Celebrations: Flag hoisting, atomic energy exhibitions, award ceremonies, singing patriotic songs, entertainment and military programmes, speeches, etc.
- Date: 28 May
- Next time: 28 May 2026
- Frequency: Annual

Youm-e-Takbir (Urdu: یومِ تکبیر; lit. The day of greatness) is celebrated as a national day in Pakistan on 28 May in commemoration of Chagai-I and Chagai-II series of nuclear tests. The nuclear tests made Pakistan the seventh nation to possess nuclear weapons and the first in the Muslim world.

== Etymology ==
This phrase is recited by Muslims in many different situations. For example, when they are very happy, during times of extreme stress, to express approval, to praise a speaker, or as a battle cry (contemporarily used by Pakistan Army). In the Islamic world, instead of applause, often someone will shout Takbir or Nara-e-Takbir (in Urdu or Persian) and the crowd will respond with Allahu Akbar (God is great). The word is also used in Muslim prayers. The Government of Pakistan asked for proposals from the nation to decide a name by which the day should be celebrated. A country wide campaign was launched to select the name for this particular day. Thousands of names were proposed by millions of Pakistanis. This name was suggested by more than one person. All the people who suggested this name were given the Prime Minister Award. Youm-e-Takbir here can be translated to "The day of greatness" or "The day of God's greatness".

== History ==
The Prime Minister of Pakistan at the time, Nawaz Sharif and by the joint efforts of Dr Abdul Qadeer Khan ordered the launching of the nuclear bomb test in response to Indian threats and nuclear tests (Pokhran-II).

== Celebrations ==
The day was officially signed by then Prime Minister Nawaz Sharif. It was first celebrated by giving awards such as the Chagai Medal to various individuals and industries in the fields of science and industry. The Sharif government also established the Chagai I Medal which was first awarded to the scientists of Pakistan in 1998 who witnessed the tests. The graphite mountains are visibly shown in the gold medallion and equal ribbon stripes of yellow, red and white.

== See also ==
- Public holidays in Pakistan
- Defence Day
- Independence Day
