= Shaukat Zaidi =

Pakistani actor and playwright (1951/1952 – 2024)

- شوکت زیدی
- Born: 1951/1952; Pakistan
- Died: 13 January 2024 (aged 72); Lahore, Punjab, Pakistan
- Occupations: Actor; Playwright

Shaukat Zaidi (Urdu: شوکت زیدی; 1951/1952 – 13 January 2024) was a Pakistani actor and playwright, known for his performance in television show Hum Sub Umeed Se Hain.

== Career ==
Throughout his career, Zaidi performed many times in various dramas, winning the hearts of viewers. In addition to the glamour of the entertainment industry, from 1970 till 1998 Shaukat remained in the forefront of journalism, showing resilience and perseverance in difficult times.

== Death ==
Zaidi died from kidney disease at a private medical facility in Lahore, on 13 January 2024, at the age of 72.
