= Shamozai, Mardan =

شموزۍ شموزںٔی
- Union council
- Shamozai
- Country: Pakistan
- Province: Khyber Pakhtunkhwa
- Division: Malakand
- District: Swat
- Tehsil: Barikot
- Demonym(s): Shamozwal, Shamozay
- Time zone: UTC+5 (PST)
- Postal code: 19250

Shamozai (Pashto: شموزۍ , Romanized: šamozǝy )(Urdu: شموزںٔی), is a union council in Swat District of Khyber Pakhtunkhwa. It is located at the edge of Swat river and have border with Lower Dir. Villages present in it are Zarkhela, Khazana, Rangila, Terang, Dedawar, Malak Abad, Garhi, Nimogram, Landake, Gamkot etc. The local language of this place is Pashto.The Name Shamozai is Derived From Pashto. Shamozai Is subclan of Dilazak Pashtun.
