= Public holidays in Pakistan =

Holidays in Pakistan are celebrated according to the Islamic or Gregorian calendars for religious and civil purposes, respectively. Religious holidays such as Eid are celebrated according to the Islamic calendar whereas other national holidays such as Labour Day, Pakistan Day, Independence Day, and Quaid-e-Azam Day are celebrated according to the Gregorian calendar. Seasonal festivals are celebrated according to the Bikrami calendar.

== National holidays ==
Date	English Name	Local Name	Notes
5 February	Kashmir Day	یومِ یکجہتیِ کشمیر Yōum-e-Yakjehtī Kashmīr	Observed to show Pakistan's support and unity with the people of Jammu and Kashmir.
23 March	Pakistan Day	یومِ پاکستان Yōum-e-Pākistān	Commemorates the Lahore Resolution, which formally demanded an independent Muslim-majority state to be created out of British India. The republic was also declared on this day in 1956.
1 May	Labour Day	یومِ مزدور Yōum-e-Mazdoor	Celebrates the achievements of labour.
28 May	Youm-e-Takbeer	یومِ تکبیر Yōum-e-Takbīr	Commemorates the Chagai-I and Chagai-II series of nuclear tests.
14 August	Independence Day	یومِ آزادی Yōum-e-Azādī	Marking Pakistani independence and the formation of Pakistan in 1947.
9 November	Iqbal Day	یومِ اقبال Yōum-e-Iqbāl	Birthday of Muhammad Iqbal, national poet of Pakistan.
25 December	Quaid-e-Azam Day	یومِ قائدِاعظم Yōum-e-Quaid-e-Āzam	Birthday of Muhammad Ali Jinnah, founder of Pakistan.

== Islamic religious holidays ==
Date	English Name	Local Name	Notes
Muharram 9th & 10th	Ashura	عاشورہ/یومِ کربلا	Karbala Day for Shias to the mourn for the martyred Imam Hussein ibn Ali, Grandson of Prophet Muhammad. For Sunni Muslims, Ashura marks the parting of the Red Sea by Prophet Musa and the salvation of the Israelites. Also on this day, Prophet Nuh disembarked from the Ark, God forgave Prophet Adam, and Prophet Yusuf was released from prison.
Rabiʽ al-Awwal 12th	Eid Milad-un-Nabi	عید میلاد النبی	Birthday of the Islamic prophet Muhammad
Shawwal 1st	Eid-ul-Fitr	عيد الفطر	Marks the end of the fasting month of Ramadan
Dhu al-Hijjah 10th	Eid-ul-Adha	عید الاضحٰی	Marks the end of the Hajj pilgrimage; sacrifices offered on this day commemorate Abraham's willingness to sacrifice his son

== Optional holidays ==
Date	English Name	Local Name	Notes
1 January	New Year's Day	نئے سال کا دن Nayē Sāl kā Din	Commemorates the first day of the Gregorian calendar
Rajab 27th (27 January)	Lailat al-Miʿraj	شب معراج Shab-i Mi'rāj	Observes the night journey of Prophet Muhammad to Al-Aqsa and the heaven
Magha 5th (2 February)	Basant Panchami	بسنت پنچمی Basant Panchamī	Marks the start of spring and also honours the Hindu goddess Saraswati
Shaban 14th–15th (13–14 February)	Shab-e-Barat	شبِ برأت Shab-e-Barāt	Night of forgiveness for the Sunni Muslims
Phalguna 14th (26 February)	Maha Shivaratri	مہا شیوراتری Mahāshivarātri	Honours the Hindu deities Shiva and Parvati
First full moon of Phalguna (14 March)	Holi	ہولی Holī	Celebrates the love between the Hindu deities Radha and Krishna
Farvardin 1st (20 March)	Nowruz	نوروز Naurōz	Persian New Year
Farvardin 7th (26 March)	Khordad Sal	خرداد سال; Khordād Sāl	Commemorates the birthday of Zoroaster in Zoroastrianism (Persian Culture)
Vaisakh 1st (14 April)	Vaisakhi	ویساکھی; Vaisākhī	Celebrates the spring harvest in Punjab
18 April	Good Friday	شام کلوری; Shām-e-Calvary	Observes the crucifixion of Jesus in Christianity
20 April	Easter	عیدالفصح; Eīd-ul-Fisah	Commemorates the resurrection of Jesus in Christianity
Jalál 13th (20 April)	Ridván	عید رضوان; Eīd-e-Rizwān	Commemorates Baháʼu'lláh's declaration as a Manifestation of God in Baháʼí Faith
First full moon of Vaisakha (5 May)	Buddha's Birthday	بدھ کا جنم دن; Buddhā kā Janam Din	Commemorates the birthday of Siddhartha Gautama
Safar 20th (15 August)	Arba'in	چہلم; Chehlum	Marks forty days after Ashura
Bhadra 8th (16 August)	Krishna Janmashtami	کرشنا جنم اشٹمی; Krishnā Janmashṭamī	Commemorates the birthday of Hindu deity Krishna
Rabi' al-Thani 11th (4 September)	Gyarvi Sharif	گیارہویں شریف; Gyārvī Sharīf	Commemorates the gratuity and generosity of the Sufi scholar Abdul Qadir Gilani on the 11th of every month
6 September	Defence Day	یومِ دفاع Yōum-e-Difā	To commemorate the sacrifices made by Pakistani soldiers in defending its borders and interests.
Ashvina 6th–10th (28 September–2 October)	Durga Puja	درگا پوجا; Durgā Pūjā	Celebrated because of Hindu deity Durga's victory over Mahishasura
Ashvina 10th (2 October)	Vijayadashami	دسہرہ; Dussehra	Marks the end of Durga Puja
Ashvina 14th (6 October)	Diwali	دیوالی; Dīwālī	Symbolises the spiritual "victory of light over darkness, good over evil, and knowledge over ignorance" in Hinduism
Ashvina 15th (7 October)	Guru Valmiki's Birthday	گرو والمیکی کا جنم دن; Gūrū Vālmikī kā Janam Din	Commemorates the birthday of the legendary poet Valmiki
First full moon of Kattak (5 November)	Guru Nanak Gurpurab	گرو نانک گروپورب; Gūrū Nānak Gurpūrab	Commemorates the birthday of the founder of Sikhism, Guru Nanak

- The Gregorian dates are according to the year 2025.

== Historical evolution of holidays in Pakistan ==
In early years of its independence, people in Pakistan used to observe many multi faith holidays such as Holi, Diwali, Christmas, etc. However, as the population of minority religions dropped - from about 14% in 1947 to 3.52% in 2017, the number of multiple-faith holidays also dropped. The main cause of the decline of the population minorities is the separation of Bangladesh, where the ratio of the non-Muslim to the total populace was high.
