= 2026 PIMS hospital fire =

Hospital fire in Islamabad, Pakistan

- A view of Pims NICU after fire erupted on August 26, 2026
- Date: 26 August 2026
- Location: Islamabad, Pakistan; 33°42′08″N 73°03′09″E
- Type: Fire
- Deaths: 14

Early on 26 August 2026, a fire broke out in the maternity ward of the Pakistan Institute of Medical Sciences (PIMS) in Islamabad, killing 14 newborn babies.

== Background and cause ==
Initial reports indicated that the fire was caused by an air-conditioning compressor that exploded inside the nursery. The incident was among the deadliest hospital fires in Pakistan in recent years, highlighting concerns over the country's under-resourced and overburdened public healthcare facilities.

=== Timeline ===
According to the PIMS administration, the fire broke out inside the nursery at approximately 6:38 a.m. on 26 August 2026. Rescue officials, however, gave a slightly different account, stating that the fire began around 6:45 a.m. following an explosion involving an air-conditioning compressor. The fire reportedly spread rapidly after coming into contact with oxygen points connected to the incubators. Of the 15 or 16 newborns reportedly present in the nursery, only one was rescued. Accounts of the cause also differed, with rescue officials citing an air-conditioning compressor explosion, while PIMS Executive Director Imran Sikandar attributed the fire to an electrical short circuit. Witnesses said that the rescue effort was delayed during the fire, which killed 14 newborn babies. On 27 August, the National Assembly's health committee visited PIMS to examine the circumstances surrounding the fire. Committee chairman Dr Mahesh Kumar said there was no conclusive evidence that the fire had originated from an old air-conditioning unit, which had reportedly been out of service for some time. CCTV footage and statements from staff did not establish the source of the initial spark. The committee said it was examining possible faults in the oxygen pipeline and electrical wiring, noting that the fire had spread rapidly and that the oxygen supply may have accelerated its spread. The committee also questioned why the nursery had been located in an older building dating from 1990 rather than in a newer, better-equipped block.

== Aftermath ==
Prime Minister Shehbaz Sharif expressed his condolences over the deaths and ordered an investigation into the fire. He later ordered the immediate suspension and removal of Federal Health Secretary Aslam Ghori from his post and constituted a high-level inquiry committee to investigate the fire. The Muttahida Qaumi Movement–Pakistan (MQM-P) rejected calls for the resignation of Federal Health Minister Syed Mustafa Kamal following the fire. Sindh Assembly member Engineer Syed Muhammad Usman said the incident should not be politicised and called for a transparent and impartial investigation to determine responsibility. He argued that previous federal governments should also be considered in the investigation, noting that PIMS was established in 1987 and had operated under successive governments.

== International response ==
Saudi Arabia's Ministry of Foreign Affairs expressed its condolences to the families of the victims and to the government and people of Pakistan following the fire. The ministry said that Saudi Arabia stood in solidarity with the victims' families and wished Pakistan and its people security and safety. President of the Maldives Mohamed Muizzu sent condolences to Prime Minister Shehbaz Sharif, the Government of Pakistan and the families of the victims. He expressed hope that the investigation into the fire would lead to stronger preventive measures in the future. UNICEF Representative in Pakistan Pernille Ironside expressed condolences to the victims' families and called for an urgent review and strengthening of fire-prevention and safety standards across healthcare facilities.
