= Hashim Kakar =

Justice of Supreme Court of Pakistan
- Incumbent
- Assumed office 14 February 2025
- Preceded by: Naeem Akhtar Afghan

Chief Justice of Balochistan High Court
- In office 20 April 2024 – 13 February 2025

Justice of Balochistan High Court
- In office 12 May 2011 – 20 April 2024

Personal details
- Born: 18 September 1963 (age 63)
- Education: University of Balochistan (MA) University Law College, University of Balochistan, Quetta (LL.B)

Muhammad Hashim Kakar (born 18 September 1963) is a jurist from Pakistan who has been a Justice of the Supreme Court of Pakistan since 14 February 2025. He also served as chief justice of the Balochistan High Court from 20 April 2024 to 13 February 2025.
