= Pakistan Day =

National holiday in Pakistan

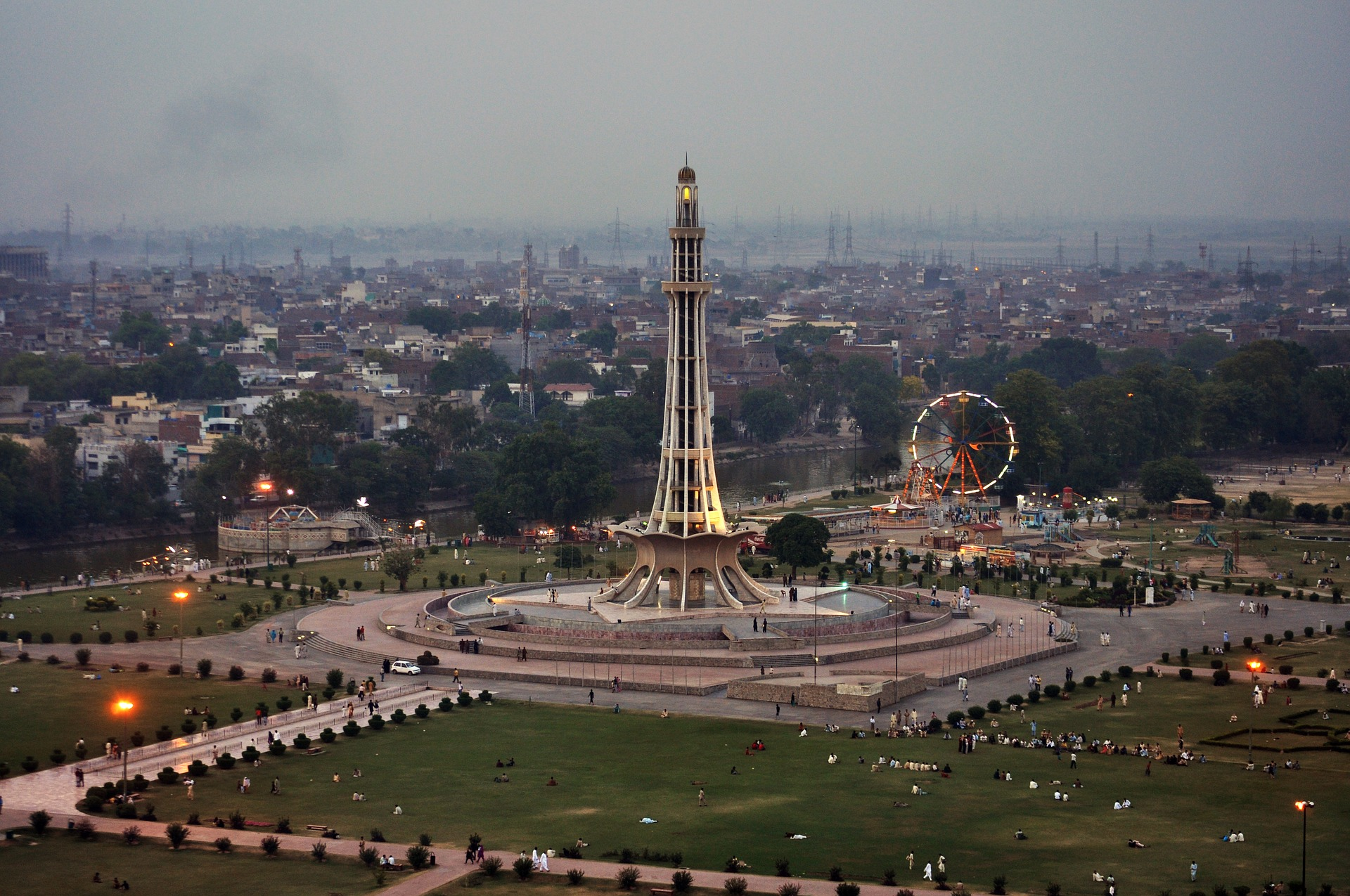
- Minar-e-Pakistan, where the Lahore Resolution was passed
- Official name: یومِ پاکستان, Yaum-e-Pakistan (Note: Official name is (Urdu: Urdu: یومِ پاکستان, lit. Yaum-e-Pakistan) or Pakistan Day in English. The day also commemorates Joint Inter-Services parade. Unofficially, the day is also known as 23 March)
- Observed by: Pakistan
- Type: Islamic Republic
- Significance: Commemoration of Pakistan Resolution and Constitution
- Celebrations: Full Joint Inter-Services military parade, conferring of Pakistani national honours
- Observances: Pakistan (Diplomatic missions of Pakistan in other countries)
- Begins: 23 March
- Ends: 23 March
- Date: 23 March
- Next time: 23 March 2027
- Duration: 24 hours
- Frequency: Annual
- First time: 23 March 1940 (86 years ago) 23 March 1957 (69 years ago)

Pakistan Day (Urdu: یومِ پاکستان, romanized: Yaum-e-Pakistan) is a national holiday in Pakistan celebrated annually on 23 March. It commemorates both the adoption of the first constitution, transitioning the country from a dominion to a republic in 1956; as well as the adoption of the Lahore Resolution by the Muslim League at the Minar-e-Pakistan (lit. 'Pakistan Tower') in 1940, laying the foundations of the Pakistan Movement.

The day is celebrated annually, primarily by Government officials and army staff throughout the country, and is a public holiday for civilians. While civilians do not celebrate the public holiday, the Pakistan Armed Forces usually hold a military parade to celebrate both the passing of the Lahore Resolution in 24 March 1940 and the Constitution of Pakistan of 1956.

== History ==
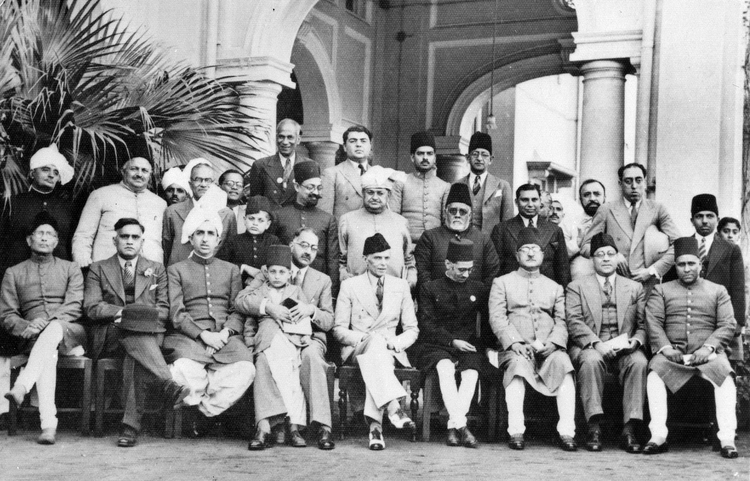
Group photo of Muhammad Ali Jinnah (in centre) and some of the Founding Fathers of Pakistan in Lahore, c. 1940

The Muslim League held its annual session at Minto Park in Lahore, Punjab, from 22 March to 24 march 1940. During this event, the Muslim League led by Muhammad Ali Jinnah and other Founding Fathers narrated the events regarding the differences between Hindus and Muslims, and presented the Lahore resolution on 23rd March 1940 and was later passed on 24th March 1940 that cemented the formation of independent states in subcontinent it did not actually mention Pakistan at all.

The resolution was moved by A. K. Fazlul Huq (26 October 1873 – 27 April 1962), often called Sher-e-Bangla, passed on 24th March and had its signatures from the Founding Fathers of Pakistan. It reads as:

[Quoting Resolution:] No constitutional plan would be workable or acceptable to the Muslims unless geographical contiguous units are demarcated into regions which should be so constituted with such territorial readjustments as may be necessary. That the areas in which the Muslims are numerically in majority as in the North-Western and Eastern zones of India should be grouped to constitute independent states in which the constituent units shall be autonomous and sovereign.

The British plan to partition the Indian subcontinent into two dominions - India and Pakistan - was announced on 3 June 1947. In the event, Pakistan was created on 14 August 1947 and Indian independence came a day later. Pakistan was immediately identified as a migrant state born amid bloodshed. Muhammad Ali Jinnah, the founder of Pakistan, became the first Governor-General of Pakistan with Liaqat Ali Khan becoming the first Prime Minister of Pakistan. The Indian Act of 1935 provided the legal framework for Pakistan until 1956, when the state passed its own constitution.

While Pakistan's Independence Day celebrates its freedom from British rule, the Republic Day celebrates the coming into force of its constitution.

Works and efforts by the Basic Principles Committee drafted the basic outlines of the constitution in 1949. After many deliberations and years of some modifications, the first set of the Constitution of Pakistan was enforced in the country on 23 March 1956. This marked the country's successful transition from Dominion to Islamic Republic. The Governor-General was replaced with the President of Pakistan as ceremonial head of state. Initially it was called Republic Day but after Ayub Khan's takeover its name was changed to Pakistan Day due to the end of democracy in Pakistan.

== Celebrations ==
The main celebration is held in Islamabad, the capital of Pakistan. The President of Pakistan is usually the Chief Guest; also in attendance are the Prime Minister of Pakistan alongside the Cabinet ministers, military chiefs of staff, and chairman joint chiefs.

A full inter-services joint military parade is rehearsed and broadcast live by the news media all over the country. The Pakistan military inter services also gives a glance of its power and capabilities during this parade.

The celebrations regarding the holiday include a full military and civilian parade in the capital, Islamabad. These are presided by the President of Pakistan and are held early in the morning. After the parade, the President confers national awards and medals on the awardees at the Presidency. Wreaths are also laid at the mausoleums of Allama Sir Muhammad Iqbal and Quaid-i-Azam Muhammad Ali Jinnah, founder of Pakistan. In very rare times and significance, foreign dignitaries have been invited to attend the military parade.

In the United States, while New York City has celebrated North America's largest Pakistan Day parade for decades, New Jersey's first annual Pakistan Day parade was held on 16 August 2015, in Edison and Woodbridge, New Jersey.

== See also ==
- History of Pakistan
- Holidays in Pakistan
- Iqbal Day
- Minar-e-Pakistan

== Notes and references ==
Citations
