= Jinnah's birthday =

Public holiday in Pakistan

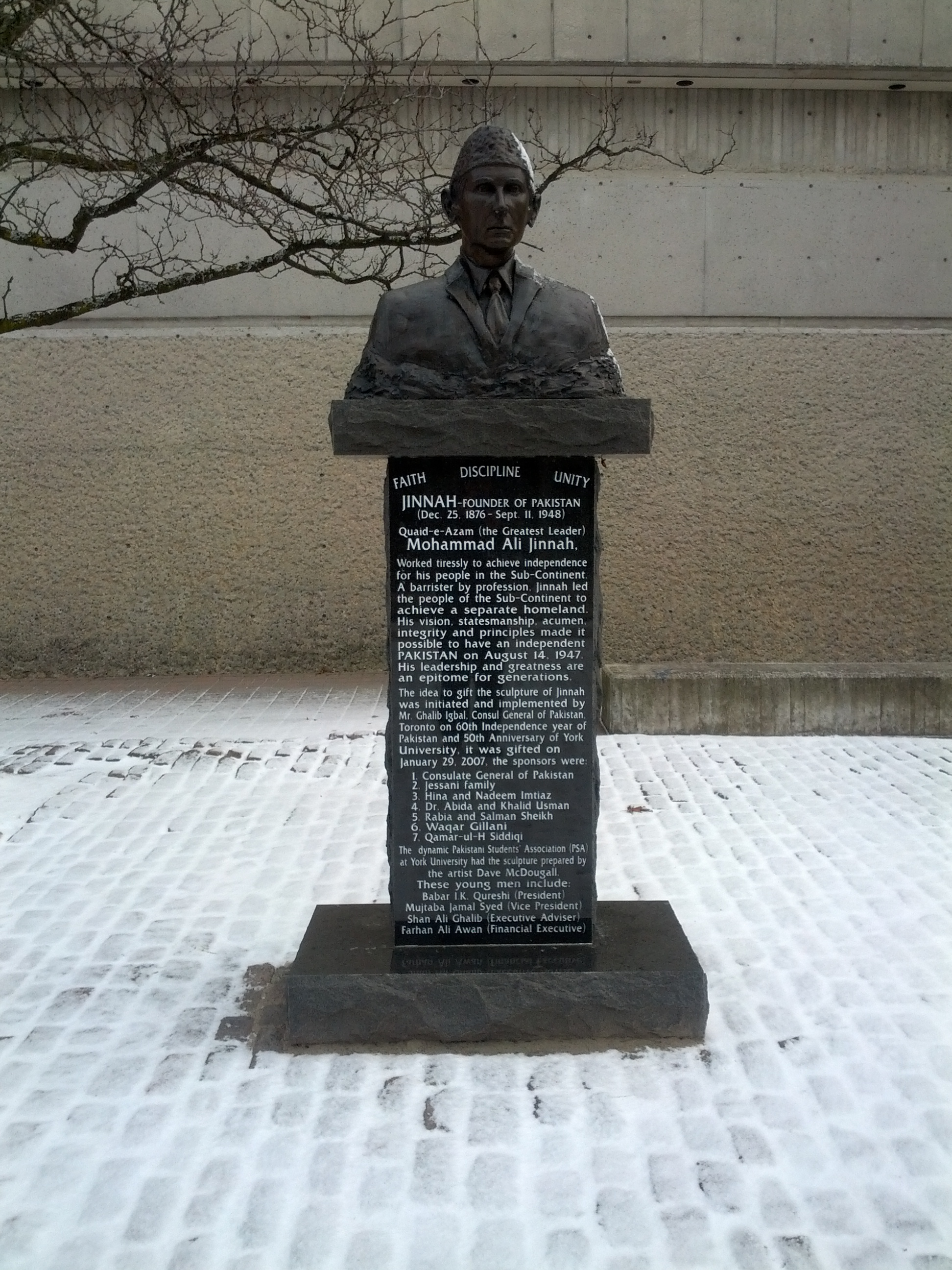
- Statue of Jinnah at the York University
- Official name: Quaid-e-Azam Day
- Also called: Quaid Day
- Observed by: Pakistan
- Type: National
- Significance: Honours Muhammad Ali Jinnah, founder and the first governor-general of Pakistan
- Date: 25 December
- Frequency: Annual

Jinnah's birthday, officially Quaid-e-Azam Day and sometimes known as Quaid Day, is a public holiday in Pakistan observed annually on 25 December to celebrate the birthday of the founder of Pakistan, Muhammad Ali Jinnah, known as Quaid-i-Azam ("Great Leader"). A major holiday, commemorations for Jinnah began during his lifetime in 1942, and have continued ever since. The event is primarily observed by the government and the citizens of the country where the national flag is hoisted at major architectural structures such as private and public buildings, particularly at the top of Quaid-e-Azam House in Karachi.

== History ==
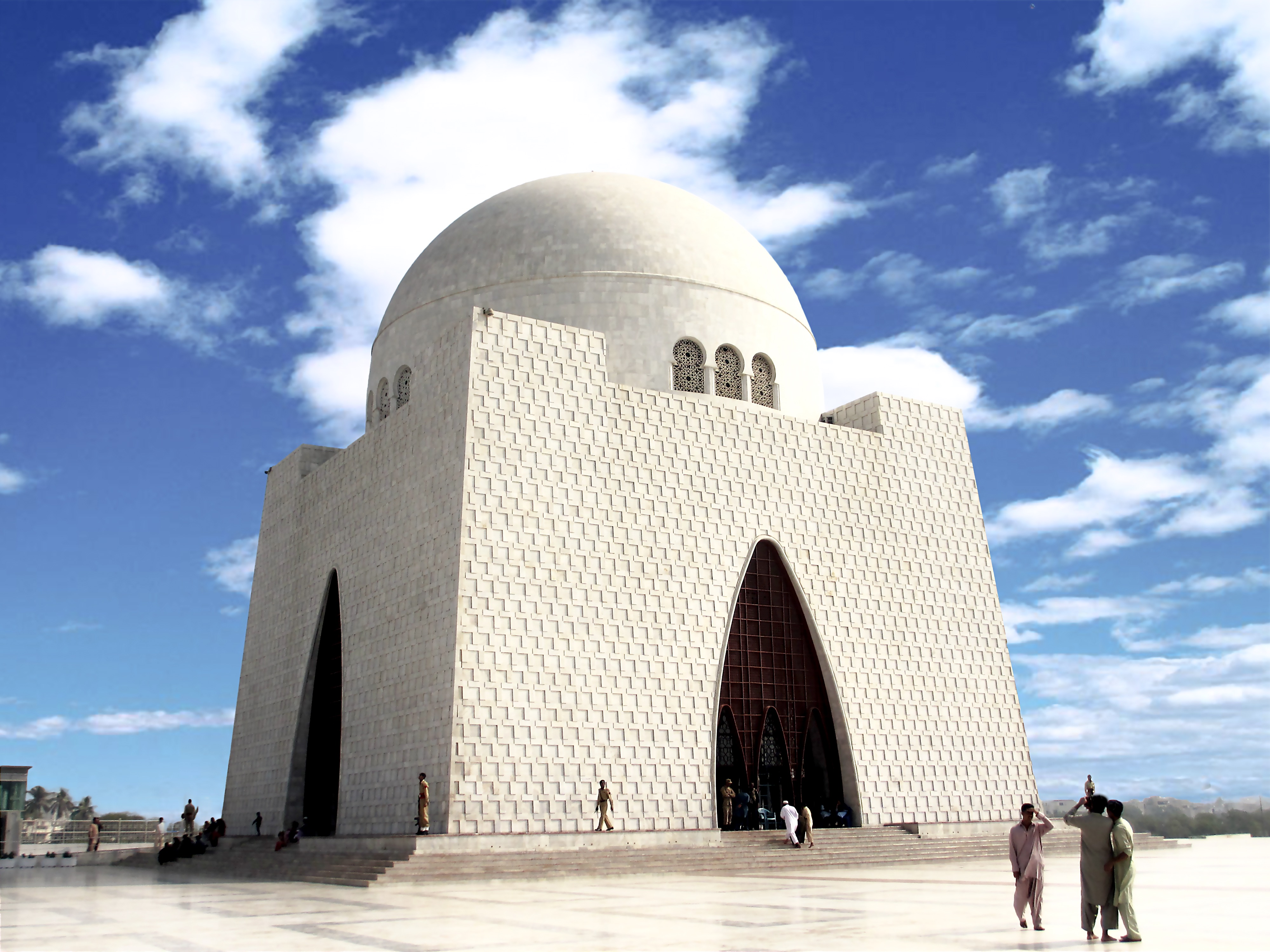
Tomb of Muhammad Ali Jinnah in Karachi

Muhammad Ali Jinnah (1876–1948) was the founder and first governor-general of Pakistan. He is among the most revered leaders in the country's history, and often referred to as Qaid-e-Azam, meaning "Great Leader". In 1942, numerous events commemorated Jinnah on his birthday, 25 December: the All-India Muslim League organised a fund for the poor and Liaquat Ali Khan held a reception for the leader. At the Wellington Pavilion in Delhi, Muslim citizens also held a reception for Jinnah. From then on, numerous events were held yearly on 25 December to honour Jinnah during his lifetime; this included receptions, parades, commemorations, speeches and recognition from other world leaders.

== Observance and traditions ==
A major holiday in Pakistan, it is celebrated conventionally across the country. Since 25 December is coincidentally also Christmas, Pakistani citizens observe both holidays on 25 December.

The unified ritualistic event, usually attended by prominent leaders, military commanders and citizens, is organised at Mazar-e-Quaid, and while it is aimed at to highlight the life of Jinnah, all public and private sectors, including schools, colleges and universities remain closed to organise multiple events such as debates, seminars and exhibitions at respective locations without being involved in office management.

== Security arrangements ==
The event's security arrangements are handled by the Pakistan Army. This is also assigned to the Pakistan Air Force. A guard mounting is also held in the country to perform ceremonial guard duties on Jinnah's Day.

== See also ==
- List of things named after Muhammad Ali Jinnah
- Public holidays in Pakistan

== General sources ==
- Ahmed, Akbar S. (2005) [First published 1997]. Jinnah, Pakistan, and Islamic Identity: The Search for Saladin. London: Routledge. ISBN 978-1-134-75022-1.
