= Iqbal Day =

Public holiday in Pakistan

Iqbal Day یومِ اقبال
- Official name: Iqbal Day
- Also called: یومِ ولادتِ محمد اقبال transliterated as Yōm-e Welādat-e Muḥammad Iqbāl
- Observed by: Pakistan
- Date: 9 November
- Frequency: Annual

Iqbal Day (Urdu: یومِ اقبال, romanized: Yōm-e Iqbāl) is the birthday of Islamic philosopher and poet Muhammad Iqbal. Falling on 9 November, his birthday is celebrated as a public holiday in Pakistan. The public holiday status was briefly withdrawn, in 2015, before being restored in 2022 by Prime Minister Shehbaz Sharif.

== History of Muhammad Iqbal ==
Iqbal Day is organized and celebrated on 9 November every year in all the provinces as a tribute to Allama Muhammad Iqbal, the "Poet of the East". Iqbal was born on 9 November 1877 in Sialkot, within the Punjab Province of British India (now in Pakistan). He died on 21 April 1938 in Lahore, Punjab, British India. The Government of Pakistan has officially declared him the national poet.

== See also ==
- Independence Day (Pakistan)
- Pakistan Resolution
- Allahabad Address
- World Urdu Day
