= Independence Day (Pakistan) =

Public holiday celebrated on 14 August

Pakistan's Independence Day
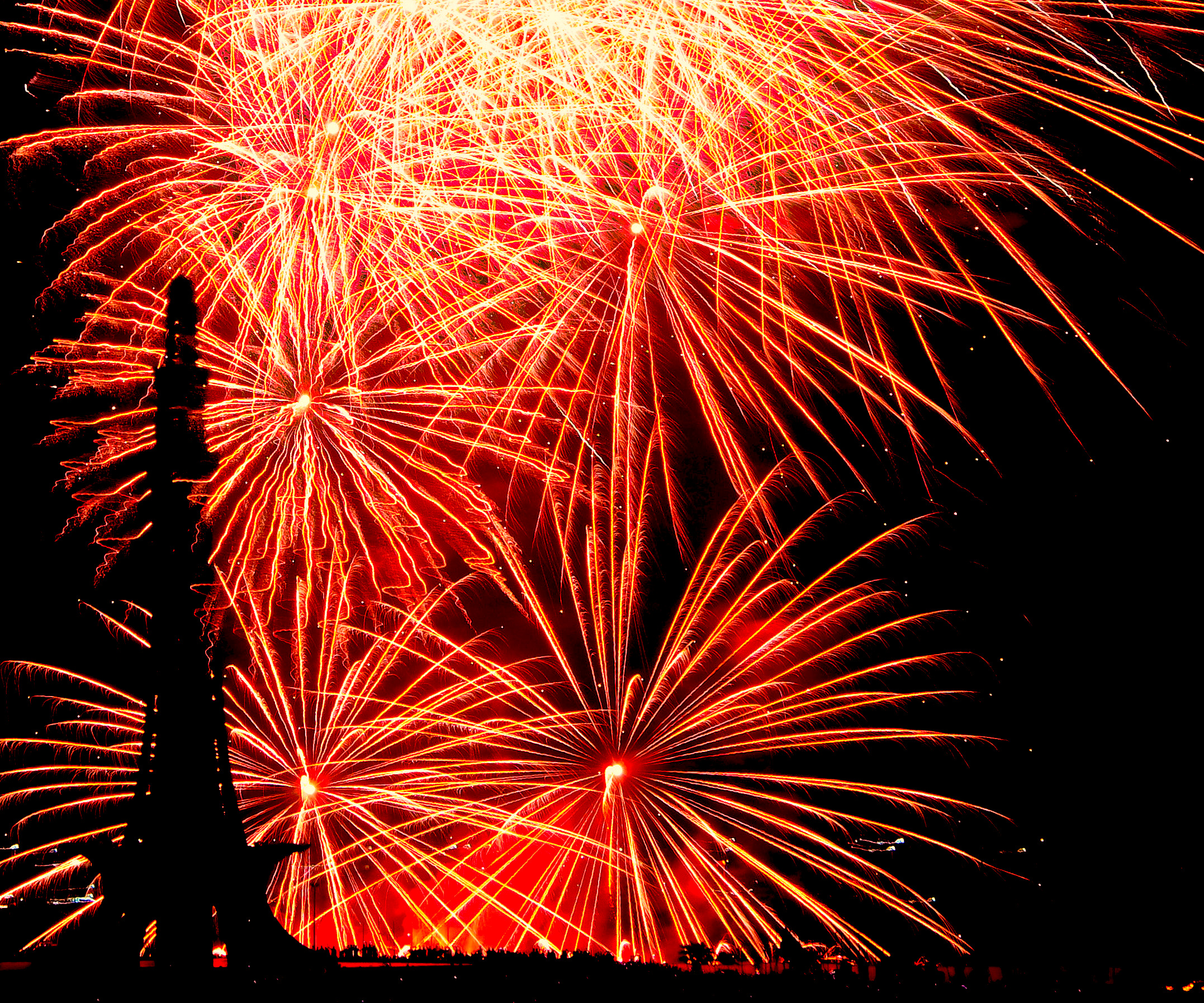
- Fireworks at Minar-e-Pakistan during the 14 August celebrations, where the Lahore Resolution was Passed
- Official name: یومِ آزادی (Yaum-i Āzādī)
- Observed by: Pakistan and Pakistanis worldwide (Pakistani Diaspora)
- Liturgical color: Green and White
- Type: National day
- Significance: Commemorates the independence of Pakistan
- Celebrations: Parades, Award ceremonies, singing patriotic songs and the national anthem, speeches by the president and prime minister.
- Date: 14 August
- Next time: 14 August 2027
- Frequency: Annual
- First time: 14 August 1947 (79 years ago)
- Related to: Pakistan Day

Independence Day (Urdu: یومِ آزادی, romanised: Yaum-i Āzādī), observed annually on 14 August, is a national holiday in Pakistan. It commemorates the day when Pakistan achieved independence from the United Kingdom and was declared a sovereign state following the termination of the British Raj at midnight at the end of 14 August 1947. Muhammad Ali Jinnah took the oath as the first Governor-General of the country on 14 August. The nation came into existence as a result of the Pakistan Movement, which aimed for the creation of an independent Muslim state in the north-western regions of British India via partition. The movement was led by the All-India Muslim League under the leadership of Muhammad Ali Jinnah. The event was brought forth by the Indian Independence Act 1947 under which the British Raj gave independence to the Dominion of Pakistan which comprised West Pakistan (present-day Pakistan) and East Pakistan (now Bangladesh). That year the day of independence coincided with 27 Ramadan of the Islamic calendar, the eve of which, one of the ten nights on which Laylat al-Qadr may occur, is regarded as sacred by Muslims.

The main Independence Day ceremony takes place in Islamabad, where the national flag is hoisted at the Presidential and Parliament buildings. It is followed by the national anthem and live televised speeches by leaders. Usual celebratory events and festivities for the day include flag-raising ceremonies, parades, cultural events, and the playing of patriotic songs. A number of award ceremonies are often held on this day, and Pakistanis hoist the national flag atop their homes or display it prominently on their vehicles and attire.

== History ==
=== Background ===
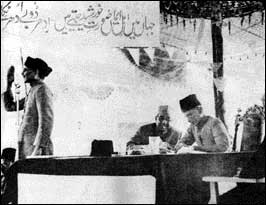
Jinnah chairing a session in Muslim League general session, where the Lahore Resolution was passed.

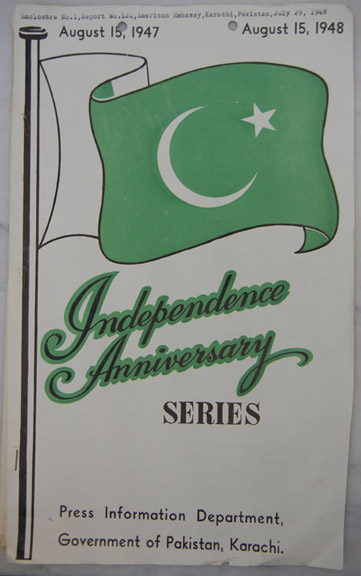
Cover of a press release; "Independence Anniversary Series" by the Press Information Department of Pakistan, in 1947 in relation to the country's first independence day which was celebrated on 15 August 1947.

The area constituting Pakistan was historically a part of the British Indian Empire throughout much of the nineteenth century. The East India Company began their trade in colonial India in the 17th century, and the company rule started from 1757 when they won the Battle of Plassey. Following the Indian Rebellion of 1857, the Government of India Act 1858 led to the British Crown assuming direct control over much of the Indian subcontinent. All-India Muslim League was founded by the All India Muhammadan Educational Conference at Dhaka, in 1906, in the context of the circumstances that were generated over the division of Bengal in 1905 and the party aimed at creation of a separate Muslim state.

The period after World War I was marked by British reforms such as the Montagu-ford Reforms, but it also witnessed the enactment of the repressive Rowlatt Act and strident calls for self-rule by Indian activists. The widespread discontent of this period crystallised into nationwide non-violent movements of non-cooperation and civil disobedience. The idea for a separate Muslim state in the northwest regions of South Asia was introduced by Allama Iqbal in his speech as the President of the Muslim League in December 1930. Three years later, the name of "Pakistan" as a separate state was proposed in a declaration made by Chaudhary Rahmat Ali, in the form of an acronym. It was to comprise the five "northern units" of Punjab, Afghania (erstwhile North-West Frontier Province), Kashmir, Sindh, and Baluchistan. Like Iqbal, Bengal was left out of the proposal made by Rehmat Ali.

In the 1940s, as the Indian independence movement intensified, an upsurge of Muslim nationalism helmed by the All-India Muslim League took place, of which Muhammad Ali Jinnah was the most prominent leader. Since a long time, feelings between Hindus and Muslims were intensifying. Being a political party to secure the interests of the Muslim diaspora in British India, the Muslim League played a decisive role during the 1940s in the Indian independence movement and developed into the driving force behind the creation of Pakistan as a Muslim state in South Asia. During a three-day general session of All-India Muslim League from 22–24 March 1940, a formal political statement was presented, known as the Lahore Resolution, which called on for the creation of an independent state for Muslims. In 1956, 23 March also became the date on which Pakistan transitioned from a dominion to a republic, and is known as Pakistan Day.

=== Independence ===
In 1946, the Labour government in Britain, exhausted by recent events such as World War II and numerous riots, realised that it had neither the mandate at home, the support internationally, nor the reliability of the British Indian Army for continuing to control an increasingly restless British India. The reliability of the native forces for continuing their control over an increasingly rebellious India diminished, and so the government decided to end the British rule of the Indian Subcontinent. In 1946, the Indian National Congress, being a secular party, demanded a single state. The All India Muslim League, who disagreed with the idea of single state, stressed the idea of a separate Pakistan as an alternative. The 1946 Cabinet Mission to India was sent to try to reach a compromise between Congress and the Muslim League, proposing a decentralised state with much power given to local governments, but it was rejected by both of the parties and resulted in a number of riots in South Asia.

Eventually, in February 1947, Prime Minister Clement Attlee announced that the British government would grant full self-governance to British India by June 1948 at the latest. On 3 June 1947, the British government announced that the principle of division of British India into two independent states was accepted. The successor governments would be given dominion status and would have an implicit right to secede from the British Commonwealth. Viceroy Mountbatten chose 15 August, the second anniversary of Japan's surrender in the World War II, as the date of power transfer. He chose 14 August as the date of the ceremony of power transfer to Pakistan because he wanted to attend the ceremonies in both India and Pakistan.

The Indian Independence Act 1947 (10 & 11 Geo 6 c. 30) passed by the Parliament of the United Kingdom divided British India into the two new independent dominions; the Dominion of India (later to become the Republic of India) and the Dominion of Pakistan (later to become the Islamic Republic of Pakistan). The act provided a mechanism for division of the Bengal and Punjab provinces between the two nations (see partition of India), establishment of the office of the Governor-General, conferral of complete legislative authority upon the respective Constituent Assemblies, and division of joint property between the two new countries. The act later received royal assent on 18 July 1947. The partition was accompanied by violent riots and mass casualties, and the displacement of nearly 15 million people due to religious violence across the subcontinent; millions of Muslim, Sikh and Hindu refugees trekked the newly drawn borders to Pakistan and India respectively in the months surrounding independence.

On 14 August 1947, the new Dominion of Pakistan became independent and Muhammad Ali Jinnah was sworn in as its first governor general in Karachi. Independence was marked with widespread celebration, but the atmosphere remained heated given the communal riots prevalent during independence in 1947.

=== The date of independence ===
Since the transfer of power took place on the midnight of 14 and 15 August, the Indian Independence Act 1947 recognised 15 August as the birthday of both Pakistan and India. The act states;

"As from the fifteenth day of August, nineteen hundred and forty-seven, two independent Dominions shall be set up in India, to be known respectively as India and Pakistan."

Jinnah in his first broadcast to the nation stated;

"August 15 is the birthday of the independent and sovereign state of Pakistan. It marks the fulfillment of the destiny of the Muslim nation which made great sacrifices in the past few years to have its homeland."

The first commemorative postage stamps of the country, released in July 1948, also gave 15 August 1947 as the independence day, however in subsequent years 14 August was adopted as the independence day. This is because Mountbatten administered the independence oath to Jinnah on the 14th, before leaving for India where the oath was scheduled on the midnight of the 15th. The night of 14–15 August 1947 coincided with 27 Ramadan 1366 of the Islamic calendar, which Muslims regard as a sacred night.

== Celebrations ==
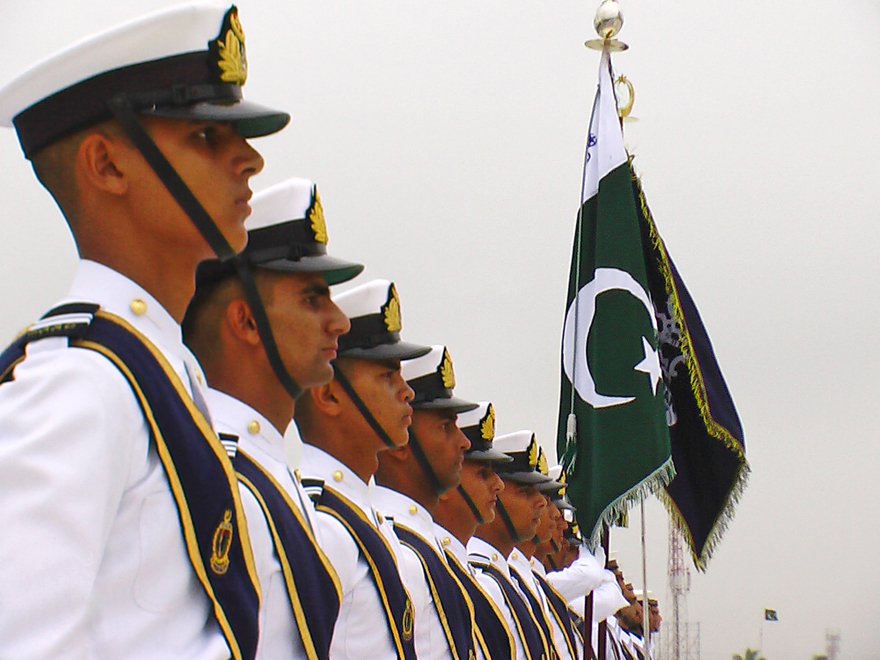
The change of guard ceremony takes place at various monuments throughout the country. Here the Pakistan Navy cadets salute the tomb of the father of the nation, Muhammad Ali Jinnah

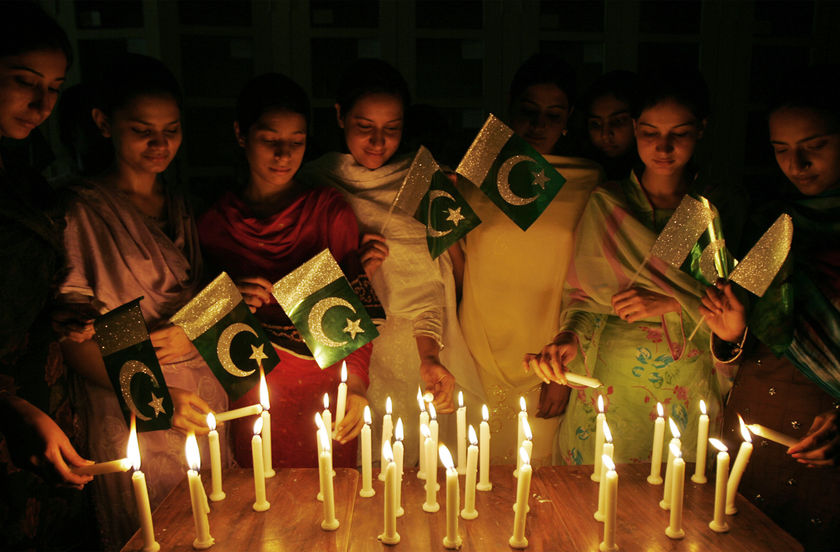
Girls lighting candles at midnight to celebrate the day

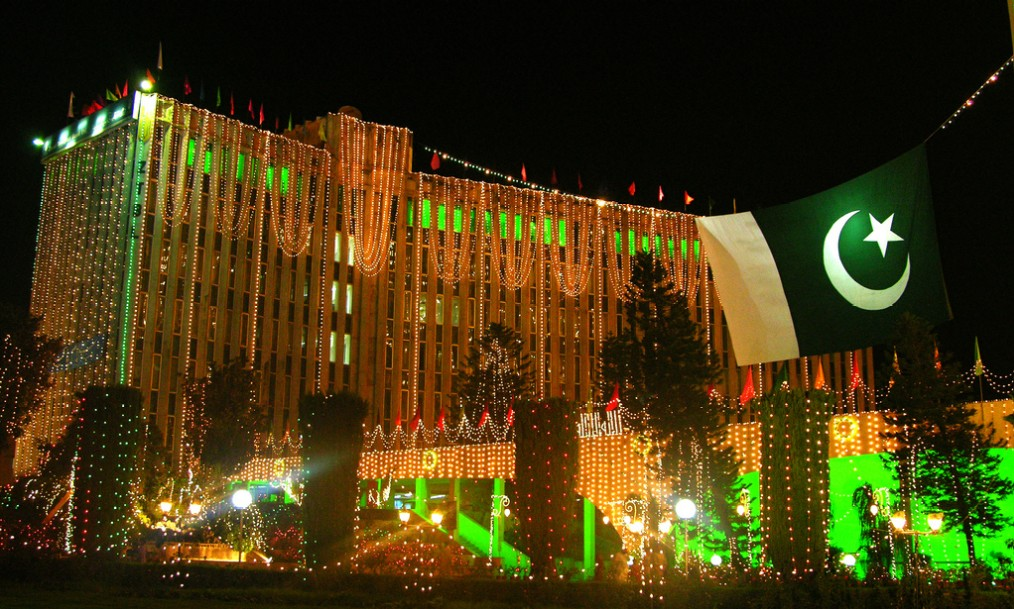
An office building in Islamabad illuminated by decorative lighting

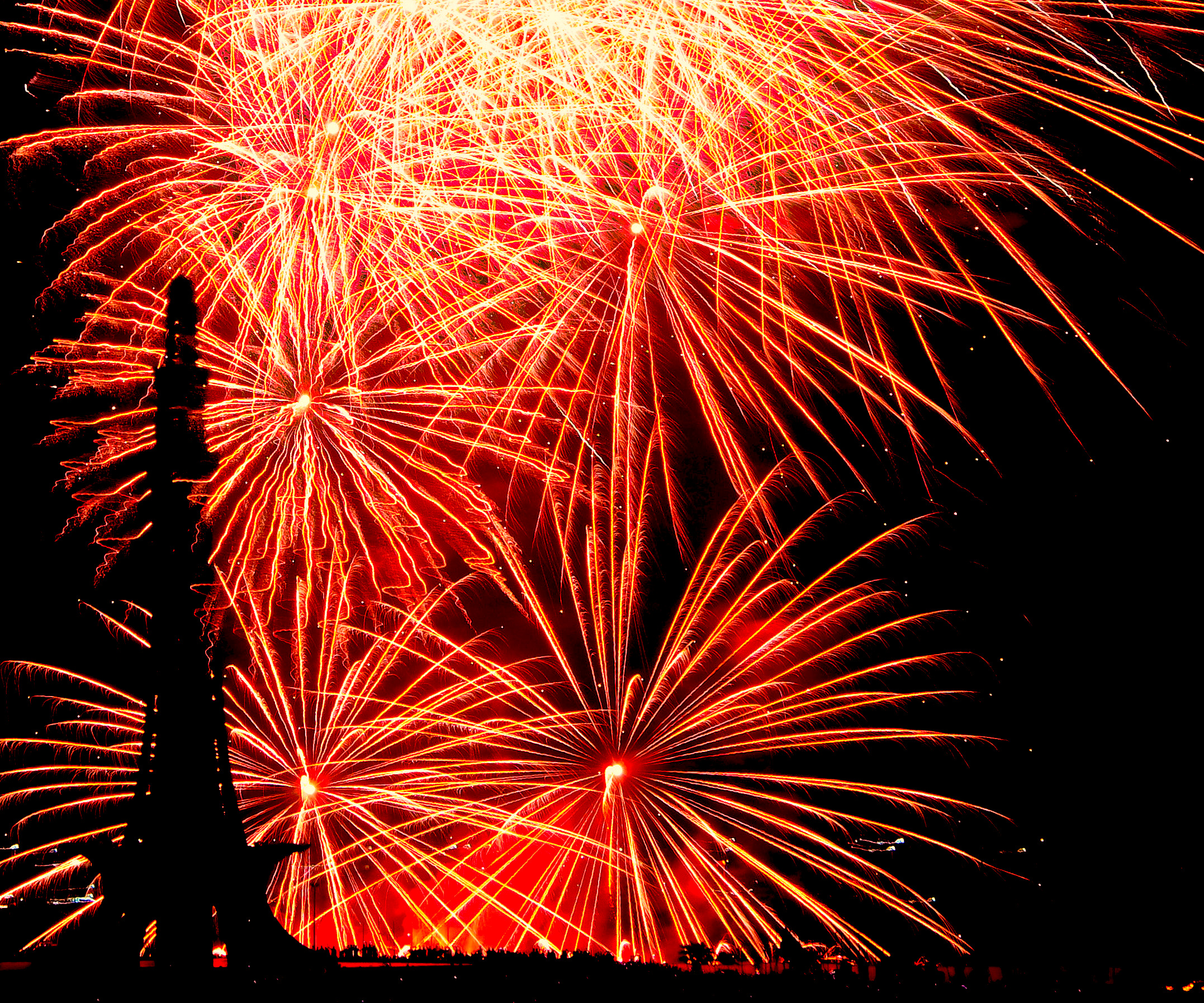
Independence Day fireworks at the Minar-e-Pakistan in Lahore

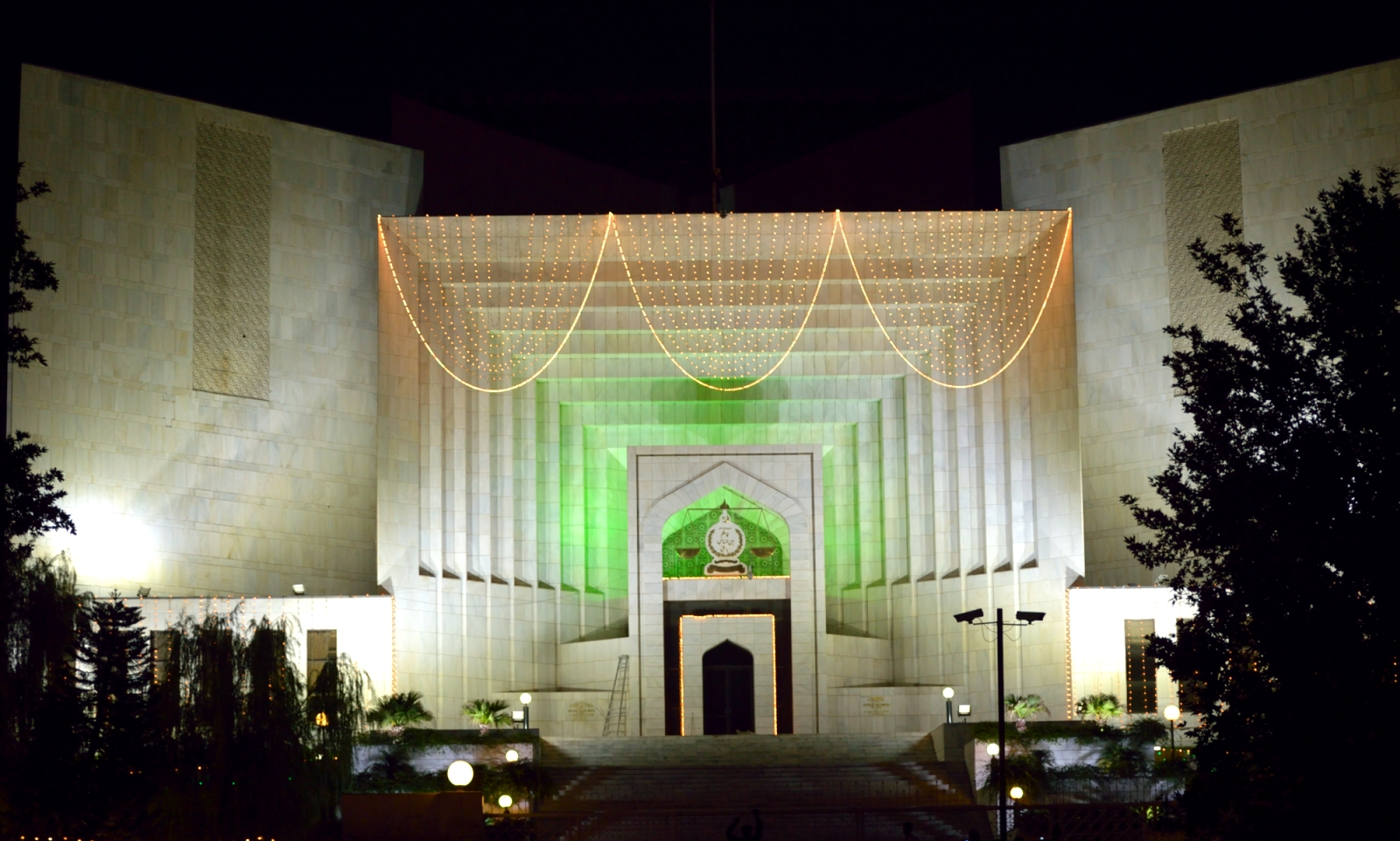
Supreme Court of Pakistan illuminated on 14 August

=== Official celebrations ===
The independence day is one of the six public holidays observed in Pakistan and is celebrated all across the country. To prepare and finalise the plans for independence day celebrations, meetings are held in the provincial capitals by local governments which are attended by government officials, diplomats, and politicians. Public organisations, educational institutions, and government departments organise seminars, sports competitions, and social and cultural activities leading up to the independence day. In Karachi, drives are initiated to clean and prepare the Mazar-e-Quaid (Jinnah Mausoleum) for the celebration.

The official festivities take place in Islamabad and commence with the raising of the national flag on the Parliament House and the Presidency followed by a 31-gun salute in the capital and a 21-gun salute in provincial capitals. The President and Prime Minister of Pakistan address the nation in live telecasts. Government officials, political leaders and celebrities deliver messages or speeches during rallies, ceremonies and events, highlighting Pakistani achievements, goals to set for the future, and praise the sacrifices and efforts of national heroes. Government buildings including the Parliament House, Supreme Court, President House and Prime Minister's Secretariat are decorated and illuminated with lights and bright colours. A change of guard takes place at national monuments by the Armed Forces. The Army, Air Force and Navy feature prominently in independence day parades. In the cities around the country, the flag hoisting ceremony is carried out by the nazim (mayor) belonging to the respective constituency, and in various public and private departments, the ceremony is conducted by a senior officer of that organisation. In 2017, the Pakistan International Airlines introduced a special in-flight jam session to entertain passengers travelling on Independence Day, featuring artists singing national songs on board a domestic flight.

International figures including heads of state, public personalities and diplomats extend their messages of felicitation to Pakistan, and flag raising ceremonies are held across Pakistani diplomatic missions abroad. Overseas dignitaries are invited as chief guests in ceremonies, while their military contingents often participate in parades. On the international border, Pakistani paramilitary troops exchange sweets with their cross-border counterparts as a tradition. National flags are displayed on major roads and avenues such as Shahrah-e-Faisal, Shahara-e-Quaideen, and Mazar-e-Quaid Road, leading up to Jinnah's mausoleum in Karachi. The Minar-e-Pakistan in Lahore, where the Pakistan Resolution was passed in 1940, is fully illuminated on the eve of the independence day to signify its importance in the creation of Pakistan.

=== Public celebrations ===
As the month of August begins, special stalls, fun fairs and shops are set up across the country for the sale of national flags, buntings, banners and posters, badges, pictures of national heroes, multimedia and other celebratory items. Vehicles, private buildings, homes, and streets are decorated with national flags, candles, oil lamps, pennants and buntings. Businesses engage in rigorous marketing, as do leading designer fashion outlets which stock independence-themed clothing, jewellery and self-adornments.

The day begins with special prayers for the integrity, solidarity, and development of Pakistan in mosques and religious places across the country. Citizens attending independence day parades and other events are usually dressed in Pakistan's official colours, green and white. Many people meet their friends and relatives, dine over Pakistani food, and visit recreational spots to mark the holiday. Public functions including elaborate firework shows, street parades, seminars, televised transmissions, music and poetry contests, children's shows and art exhibitions are a common part of the celebrations. Along with flag hoisting, the national anthem is sung at various government places, schools, residences, and monuments on the day, and patriotic slogans such as Pakistan Zindabad are raised. Musical concerts and dance performances are arranged both inside and outside the country, featuring popular artists. Homage is paid to the people who lost their lives during the migration and riots which followed independence in 1947, as well as martyrs of the Pakistan Army and recipients of Nishan-e-Haider, and political figures, famous artists and scientists.

Immigrant communities in Pakistan partake in the festivities as well. In countries where there are significant Pakistani communities or which share strong relations with Pakistan, the national colours and flag of Pakistan are frequently illuminated on prominent structures, squares and public monuments as a show of celebration. The Pakistani diaspora organises cultural events to celebrate independence day, and public parades are held in cities with large Pakistani populations, such as New York, London and Dubai. In addition, some Kashmiris from Indian side of Jammu and Kashmir are known to observe the day, causing friction with Indian authorities.

== Security measures ==
Security measures in the country are intensified as the independence day approaches, especially in major cities and in troubled areas. The security is set up after various representatives of intelligence and investigation agencies meet. High alert is declared in sensitive areas such as the country's capital, to restrict security threats. Despite this, there have been instances where attacks have occurred on independence day by insurgents who boycott the celebrations as a part of their protest.

On 13 August 2010, the country witnessed floods causing deaths of 1,600 people and affecting 14 million lives. On account of the calamity, the president made an announcement that there would not be any official celebration of the independence day that year.

== In popular culture ==
From the beginning of August, radio channels play milli naghmay (patriotic songs) and various TV shows and programmes highlighting the history, culture, and achievements of Pakistan are broadcast. Popular national songs like Dil Dil Pakistan and Jazba-e-Junoon are played and sung all over the country. New patriotic songs are also released each year. The film Jinnah released in 1998 follows the story of Jinnah and details the events leading up to the independence of Pakistan. The events during the independence of Pakistan are depicted in many literary and scholarly works. Khushwant Singh's novel Train to Pakistan, Saadat Hasan Manto's short story Toba Tek Singh, Larry Collins and Dominique Lapierre's book Freedom at Midnight, and poetic works of Faiz Ahmad Faiz chronicle events during the independence of Pakistan. Ali Pur Ka Aeeli by Mumtaz Mufti is an autobiography narrating the account of bringing his family from Batala to Lahore. Khaak aur Khoon (Dirt and Blood) by Naseem Hijazi describes the sacrifices of Muslims of South Asia during independence. Dastaan, a Pakistani drama serial, based on the novel Bano by Razia Butt, also tells the story of Pakistan Movement and events surrounding the independence of Pakistan.

Pakistan Post released four commemorative stamps in July 1948 for the country's first independence anniversary. Three of the four stamps depicted places from Pakistan while the fourth stamp depicted a motif. The stamps were inscribed "15th August 1947" because of the prevailing confusion of actual date of independence. In 1997, Pakistan celebrated its 50th anniversary of independence. The State Bank of Pakistan issued a special banknote of rupee 5 depicting the tomb of Baha-ud-din Zakariya on 13 August 1997, commemorating the 50th independence day. On the front of the note a star burst is encircled by Fifty Years Anniversary of Freedom in Urdu and '1947–1997' in numerals.

In November 1997, the 1997 Wills Golden Jubilee Tournament was held in Gaddafi Stadium, Lahore to mark the golden jubilee. During the final of the tournament, Pakistan Cricket Board honoured all the living test cricket captains of Pakistan by parading them in horse-drawn carriages and presenting them with gold medals. On 14 August 2004, Pakistan displayed the largest flag of the time with the dimensions of 340 by 510 feet (100 m × 160 m).

Since 2011, the Google Pakistan homepage has featured special doodles designed with Pakistani symbols to mark Pakistan's Independence Day. Such symbols have included the star and crescent, national monuments and colours, historic and artistic representations, geographic landscapes and other national symbols. Facebook allows its users in Pakistan to post an independence day status with a Pakistani flag icon on it or greets users in the country with a special message on the home page.

== See also ==
- Pakistan Day
- National symbols of Pakistan
- Public holidays in Pakistan
