= 2025 in Pakistan =

- Decades: 2000s; 2010s; 2020s
- See also: History of Pakistan; List of years in Pakistan; Timeline of Pakistani history

The events listed below are both anticipated and scheduled for the year 2025 in Pakistan.

The year 2025 will be the 78th year of the independence of Pakistan.

== Incumbents ==
=== Federal government ===
S. No	Photo	Name	Office
1		Asif Ali Zardari	President of Pakistan
2		Shehbaz Sharif	Prime Minister of Pakistan
3		Yusuf Raza Gilani	Chairman of the Senate
4		Ayaz Sadiq	Speaker of the National Assembly
5		Yahya Afridi	Chief Justice of Pakistan
6		Sikandar Sultan Raja	Chief Election Commissioner of Pakistan
7		16th National Assembly of Pakistan	National Assembly
8		16th Senate of Pakistan	Senate of Pakistan

=== Provincial government ===
Province	Governor	Chief Minister		Government Type	Chief Justice
Balochistan	Jaffar Khan Mandokhail (from 6 May 2024)	Sarfraz Bugti (from 2 March 2024)	PPP	Coalition	Rozi Khan Barrech (BHC)
Khyber Pakhtunkhwa	Faisal Karim Kundi (from 4 May 2024)	Ali Amin Gandapur (until 15 October 2025)	PTI	Coalition (Note: The government is made up of PTI members and members who are de jure independents but are de facto members of the PTI.)	Syed Muhammad Attique Shah (PHC)
Khyber Pakhtunkhwa	Faisal Karim Kundi (from 4 May 2024)	Sohail Afridi (from 15 October 2025)	PTI	Coalition	Syed Muhammad Attique Shah (PHC)
Punjab	Saleem Haider Khan (from 10 May 2024)	Maryam Nawaz (from 26 February 2024)	PML-N	Coalition	Aalia Neelum (LHC)
Sindh	Kamran Khan Tessori (from 10 October 2022)	Murad Ali Shah (from 27 February 2024)	PPP	Majority	Muhammad Junaid Ghaffar (SHC)

=== State government ===
Province	President	Prime minister		Government Type	Chief Justice
Gilgit-Baltistan	Mehdi Shah	Gulbar Khan (from 13 July 2023)	PTI	Coalition	Sardar Muhammad Shamim Khan (SACGB)
Azad Kashmir	Dr. Muhammad Najeeb Naqi Khan	Chaudhry Anwarul Haq (from 20 April 2023)	PTI	Coalition	Raja Saeed Akram Khan (SCAJK)

== Events ==
=== January ===
- 4 January – Four people are killed in a bomb attack in Turbat.
- 7 January –
  - Three soldiers and 19 militants are killed in separate raids on insurgent hideouts across Khyber Pakhtunkhwa.
  - A Karakorum K-8P jet trainer of the Pakistan Air Force crashes in Risalpur, Khyber Pakhtunkhwa, killing the pilot.
- 9 January –
  - Sixteen miners are abducted from a vehicle by militants in Lakki Marwat District, Khyber Pakhtunkhwa.
  - At least 11 miners are killed in a methane gas explosion at a coal mine in Singdi, Balochistan.
- 10 January –
  - Pakistan International Airlines resumes flights to Paris for the first time since the European Union lifted a 2020 ban on the airline from operating in its airspace.
  - Three people are injured in a bomb attack on a Frontier Corps truck in Chaman, Balochistan.
- 11 January – A truck crashes onto a passenger vehicle in Karak, killing 10 people and injuring 15 others.
- 13 January –
  - Eight Pakistani Taliban militants are killed in two raids by security forces in Khyber Pakhtunkhwa.
  - Twenty-seven militants are killed in a raid by security forces in Kachhi District, Balochistan.
- 16 January –
  - Five people are killed in an attack on a humanitarian aid convoy in Kurram District, Khyber Pakhtunkhwa.
  - A boat carrying migrants capsizes near Dakhla, Western Sahara on its way to Spain's Canary Islands, killing at least 50 people including 44 Pakistanis.
- 17 January – Former prime minister Imran Khan is sentenced to 14 years' imprisonment for corruption over the Al-Qadir Trust case. His wife, Bushra Bibi, is also sentenced to seven years' imprisonment in the same case.
- 20 January – The New Gwadar International Airport begins full operations.
- 21 January – The Provincial Assembly of the Punjab passes a law banning kite-flying in the province.
- 21 January – The National Assembly of Pakistan passes a law requiring social media platforms to register with the Social Media Protection and Regulatory Authority, and criminalizes spreading disinformation.
- 25 January – A court in Rawalpindi sentences four people to death for posting blasphemy on social media.
- 27 January – A truck carrying liquefied petroleum gas catches fire and explodes in Multan, killing 18 people.
- 28 January – Two soldiers and five militants are killed in an attack on a security outpost in Killa Abdullah District, Balochistan.
- 29 January – Two soldiers and six militants are killed in a military raid in North Waziristan.

=== February ===
- 1 February –
  - Eighteen members of the Frontier Corps are killed in an attack by the Balochistan Liberation Army on their vehicle in Mangochar Tehsil, near Mangocher town, Kalat District, Balochistan. Twenty-four attackers are also reported to have been killed.
  - Five people, including four members of the security forces, are killed in an attack by militants on their vehicle in Khyber Pakhtunkhwa.
- 2 February – Prime Minister Shehbaz Sharif launches a nationwide polio vaccination campaign by administering polio drops to children under age five.
- 3 February – A police officer escorting polio vaccination workers is killed in an ambush by unidentified gunmen in Jamrud, Khyber Pakhtunkhwa.
- 6 February –
  - Three police officers are killed in an attack on their outpost by militants in Karak District, Khyber Pakhtunkhwa.
  - FIFA imposes an indefinite suspension on the Pakistan Football Federation, citing the latter's failure to guarantee fair and democratic elections.
- 8–14 February – 2024–25 Pakistan Tri-Nation Series
- 8–9 February – A boat carrying migrants sinks off the coast of Libya on its way to Europe, killing at least 16 Pakistani nationals and leaving ten others missing.
- 13 February – Turkish President Recep Tayyip Erdoğan visits Pakistan to strengthen bilateral ties. He co-chairs the 7th Pakistan-Turkey High-Level Strategic Cooperation Council with Prime Minister Shehbaz Sharif, leading to 24 agreements in defense, energy, and trade. Both nations commit to increasing bilateral trade to $5 billion.
- 14 February – Eleven people are killed in a roadside bomb attack on a vehicle carrying coal miners in Harnai District, Balochistan.
- 15 February –
  - Four members of the security forces and 15 Pakistani Taliban militants are killed in clashes in Dera Ismail Khan and North Waziristan.
  - The Green Pakistan Initiative is launched in Cholistan, Punjab by General Asim Munir and Punjab Chief Minister Maryam Nawaz.
  - A bus carrying pilgrims for a religious festival overturns in Khairpur District, Sindh, killing 12 people and injuring 15 others.
  - A van heading to Sehwan collides with a trailer near Qazi Ahmed, Sindh killing five people and injuring 10 others.
- 17 February – Two people are killed in a gun attack on an aid convoy in Kurram District, Khyber Pakhtunkhwa.
- 18 February –
  - Four soldiers responding to the attack on the aid convoy in Kurram District the previous day are killed in an ambush by militants.
  - The Pakistan Army kills 30 militants in South Waziristan near the Afghan border during an operation.
- 19 February –
  - 2025 ICC Champions Trophy: The ninth edition of the ICC Champions Trophy commences in Karachi, marking Pakistan's first time hosting an ICC event since 1996.
  - Seven people are killed in an attack by gunmen on a bus in Barkhan District, Balochistan. The Balochistan Liberation Army subsequently claims responsibility.
  - A police officer escorting polio vaccination workers is killed in an ambush by unidentified gunmen in Bajaur, Khyber Pakhtunkhwa.
- 21 February –
  - Six militants are killed in a raid by security forces in Karak District, Khyber Pakhtunkhwa.
  - A minivan falls into a drainage channel in Kasur District, Punjab, killing eight people and injuring two others.
- 23 February – Security forces kill seven militants in two separate operations in Daraban and Maddi area of Dera Ismail Khan District, Khyber Pakhtunkhwa.
- 24 February – Ten militants are killed in a raid by security forces in Bagh, Khyber Pakhtunkhwa.
- 28 February –
  - 2025 Darul Uloom Haqqania bombing: A suicide bombing during Friday prayers in Darul Uloom Haqqania in Akora Khattak, Khyber Pakhtunkhwa, kills Hamid Ul Haq Haqqani and six others.
  - Two people are killed in a bomb attack in Orakzai District, Khyber Pakhtunkhwa.
  - Ten people are injured in a bomb attack on a vehicle carrying soldiers in Quetta.
  - Six militants are killed in a security operation in North Waziristan.

=== March ===
- 3 March –
  - Two people, including a woman perpetrator, are killed in a suicide bombing on a Frontier Corps vehicle in Kalat, Balochistan.
  - An Afghan soldier is killed during clashes with Pakistani forces at the Torkham border crossing.
- 4 March – Eighteen people are killed in a combined suicide bombing and assault on a military base in Bannu, Khyber Pakhtunkhwa, that is claimed by the Pakistani Taliban affiliate Jaish Al-Fursan.
- 11 March – 2025 Jaffar Express hijacking: Balochistan Liberation Army militants blow up railway tracks and hijack the Jaffar Express train bound from Quetta to Peshawar taking 450 people hostages including both security personnel and civilians.
- 15 March – Eleven suspected Pakistani Taliban militants are killed in raids by security forces in Mohmand and Dera Ismail Khan districts in Khyber Pakhtunkhwa.
- 16 March – 5 April – Pakistani cricket team in New Zealand in 2024–25
- 16 March – Five soldiers are killed in a suicide car bombing and ambush on their convoy in Nushki District, Balochistan.
- 20 March – Ten militants and one soldier are killed in a raid on a Pakistani Taliban hideout in Dera Ismail Khan district, Khyber Pakhtunkhwa.
- 20 March – Sixteen Pakistani Taliban militants are killed by security forces while trying to enter the country from Afghanistan in Ghulam Khan, Khyber Pakhtunkhwa.
- 28 March – 2025 Katlang drone airstrike: Eleven people are killed in drone strikes by the Pakistani military on Pakistani Taliban targets in Khyber Pakhtunkhwa.

=== April ===
- 1 April – 2025 India–Pakistan heat wave: Pakistan and India are struck by a severe heatwave with temperatures up to 50 °C, prompting health alerts. Experts link it to climate change and regional weather patterns.
- 6 April – Pakistani security forces repel an infiltration attempt by Pakistani Taliban militants near the Afghanistan-Pakistan border in North Waziristan, leaving eight militants dead.
- 7 April – Nine Pakistani Taliban militants are killed in a raid by security forces in Dera Ismail Khan.
- 12 April – Eight Pakistani laborers from Bahawalpur are killed by unidentified gunmen at an auto workshop in Mehrestan, Iran.
- 13 April – A large rally is held in Karachi in support of Palestinians amid the ongoing conflict in Gaza.
- 14 April – A KFC employee is killed in an attack by a suspected Islamist mob on one of its restaurants in Sheikhupura.
- 15 April –
  - Three officers are killed in a bomb attack on a vehicle carrying members of the security forces in Mastung District, Balochistan.
  - Two polio vaccination workers are abducted by unidentified gunmen in Dera Ismail Khan.
  - A Dassault Mirage 5 fighter jet of the Pakistan Air Force crashes in Vehari District, Punjab. The two pilots eject safely.
  - A passenger van and a trailer collide on the Indus Highway near Methakhel, Khyber Pakhtunkhwa, killing 10 people.
- 16 April – A severe hailstorm hits Islamabad, causing power outages in parts of the city.
- 18 April – A member of the Ahmadiyya community is killed in an attack by a suspected Islamist mob in Karachi.
- 22 April – A truck carrying passengers falls off a ravine in Jamshoro District, Sindh, killing 13 people and injuring 20 others.
- 23 April – Two security escorts for polio workers are killed in a gun attack in Mastung District, Balochistan.
- 24 April – 2025 India–Pakistan crisis: Pakistan suspends visas issued to Indian nationals and closes its airspace to Indian aircraft in retaliation for India accusing Pakistan of involvement in the 2025 Pahalgam attack and launching punitive measures as a result, including the suspension of the Indus Waters Treaty and entry and border restrictions.
- 25 April –
  - 2025 India–Pakistan crisis: Indian and Pakistani soldiers briefly exchange fire along the Line of Control.
  - A member of the Ahmadiyya community is killed in a shooting in Bhulair, Punjab.
  - Four soldiers are killed in a bomb attack on their vehicle in Quetta.
- 26 April – Naveed Ahmad is convicted and sentenced to life imprisonment for the attempted assassination of Imran Khan in 2022.
- 27 April – 2025 North Waziristan border clashes: Fifty-four Pakistani Taliban militants trying to enter the country from Afghanistan are killed by security forces in North Waziristan.
- 28 April –
  - Seven people are killed in a bomb attack outside the office of a peace committee in Wanna, South Waziristan.
  - A fuel truck catches fire and explodes in Nushki District, Balochistan, killing two people and injuring 56 others.

=== May ===
- 1 May –
  - 2025 India–Pakistan crisis: All madrasas in Azad Kashmir are ordered closed for 10 days citing concerns over tensions with India.
  - Three members of the security forces and one militant are killed in a raid on a Pakistani Taliban hideout in Bannu District, Khyber Pakhtunkhwa.
- 2 May – Eight members of the same family are killed after a car falls into a ravine in Lower Kohistan District, Khyber Pakhtunkhwa.
- 3 May –
  - Five militants belonging to the Tehreek-e-Taliban Pakistan are killed and two others are apprehended in three separate operations in Bajaur District, Khyber Pakhtunkhwa.
  - The Pakistani military conducts a test-fire of the Abdali Weapon System ballistic missile.
- 5 May –
  - Six girls die after getting trapped in a wheat storage drum in Kot Momin, Sargodha District, Punjab.
  - The Pakistan military conducts a test fire of the Fateh series surface-to-surface missile.
- 6 May – 2025 Machh bombing: Seven soldiers are killed in a bomb attack on a military vehicle in Kachhi District, Balochistan.
- 7 May – 2025 India–Pakistan conflict: India launches a series of airstrikes on targets in Azad Kashmir and Punjab, killing eight people.
- 9 May – The Pakistan Cricket Board orders the transfer of the remaining eight matches of the 2025 Pakistan Super League to the United Arab Emirates after a drone from India lands near the Rawalpindi Cricket Stadium before a match. Games resume on 17 May in Pakistan.
- 10 May – 2025 India–Pakistan conflict: India and Pakistan reach a ceasefire agreement.
- 11 May – Two police officers are killed in a bomb attack on their vehicle in Peshawar.
- 16 May – A doctor belonging to the Ahmadiyya community is shot dead at a hospital in Sargodha.
- 18 May – Four people are killed in a car bombing near a market in Killa Abdullah District, Balochistan.
- 19 May – 2025 Waziristan drone strike: Four children are killed in a suspected drone strike in Mir Ali, Khyber Pakhtunkhwa.
- 20 May – General Asim Munir, Chief of the Army Staff of the Pakistan Army, is promoted to Field marshal, becoming the second person in Pakistan to receive the title since Ayub Khan in 1965.
- 21 May – 2025 Khuzdar school bus bombing: A suicide bomber drives an explosives-laden vehicle into a school bus carrying students from the Army Public School in Khuzdar District, Balochistan, killing eight people, including four children and injuring 53 others.
- 24 May –
  - A bus collides with a car on GT Road in Okara, Punjab, killing seven family members traveling from Lahore to Pakpattan.
  - The bodies of four tourists from Gujrat who went missing en route from Hunza to Skardu on 16 May are found in a gorge in Roundu Valley.
- 25 May –
  - A severe windstorm and subsequent heavy rainfall in Punjab kills 15 people and injures more than 100 others.
  - 2025 Pakistan Super League final: The Lahore Qalandars win their third Pakistan Super League title, defeating Quetta Gladiators by six wickets.
- 27 May – A police officer escorting polio vaccination workers is killed in a shooting in Nushki District, Balochistan.
- 28 May – At least 10 people are reported killed in flooding and thunderstorms across central and northern Pakistan.
- 29 May – Two police officers and four Pakistani Taliban militants are killed in a raid in Rawalakot, Azad Kashmir.
- 30 May – A government official is killed in an attack claimed by the BLA on Surab, Balochistan.

=== June ===
- 1–23 June – A series of 57 earthquakes hits Karachi, ranging from 1.5 to 3.8 magnitude on the Richter Scale.
- 2 June –
  - The first case of polio in Gilgit-Baltistan since 2018 is discovered in a child from Diamer District.
  - Killing of Sana Yousaf: Social media influencer Sana Yousaf is shot dead at her home in Islamabad. The perpetrator is arrested shortly after her killing from Faisalabad.
- 3 June – 225 inmates escape from a prison in Karachi during an evacuation caused by the earthquake swarm. By 17 June, 172 of them are returned.
- 4 June – Fourteen Pakistani Taliban militants are killed in a raid by security forces in North Waziristan.
- 16 June – Pakistan orders an indefinite closure of the Iran–Pakistan border amid the Twelve-Day War.
- 27 June – At least eight people are killed in a flash flood that hits a picnic along the Swat River in Khyber Pakhtunkhwa.
- 28 June – Thirteen soldiers are killed in a suicide bombing on a military vehicle in Mir Ali, North Waziristan.
- 29 June – A magnitude 5.5 earthquake hits Balochistan, injuring five people.

=== July ===
- 1 July – One civilian is killed in an attack by gunmen on a police station and two banks in Mastung District, Balochistan.
- 2 July –
  - Five government officials, including an assistant commissioner, are killed in a roadside bomb attack on their vehicle in Bajaur District, Khyber Pakhtunkhwa.
  - Three people are injured after being attacked by a lion that had escaped a private residence in Lahore.
- 3 July – Czech mountain climber Klára Kolouchová dies after a fall while climbing Nanga Parbat.
- 4 July –
  - At least 27 people are killed in the collapse of a multi-story building in Karachi.
  - At least 30 Pakistani Taliban militants trying to enter the country from Afghanistan are killed in clashes with the military in North Waziristan.
- 7 July – A minibus collides with a car and overturns near Adda Sagran, Punjab, killing 10 people and injuring 32 others.
- 10 July – Nine people are abducted and killed by gunmen from several buses in Balochistan.
- 13 July – A bus plunges into a ravine near Chakri, Rawalpindi, killing six people and injuring 38 others.
- 16 July –
  - The United Kingdom lifts an airspace ban it imposed on Pakistani airlines since 2020, citing improved safety standards.
  - Three people are killed in a gun attack on a bus in Kalat District, Balochistan.
  - Torrential rains in Punjab kill at least 65 people and injure 290 others.
- 17 July – Pakistan, Uzbekistan, and Afghanistan sign a tripartite framework agreement in Kabul to conduct a feasibility study for the Trans-Afghan railway project.
- 18 July – The government issues a five-year moratorium on the construction of hotels around lake areas in Gilgit-Baltistan, citing environmental concerns.
- 19 July – A soldier is killed in a bomb attack in Quetta.
- 21 July – Three people are killed while 15 others are reported missing in a flash flood in Chilas District, Gilgit-Baltistan.
- 27 July –
  - Seven people are killed in a shooting during a protest rally in Tirah, Khyber Pakhtunkhwa.
  - A bus falls into a ditch near Balkassar, killing 10 people.
- 28 July –
  - Three Pakistani Taliban militants suspected of involvement in an attack on Chinese nationals in Karachi in 2024 are killed in a raid by security forces.
  - German athlete Laura Dahlmeier is killed in a rockfall while climbing in the Karakoram mountains.
- 29 July – 2025 Bajaur Operation
- 31 July – A court in Faisalabad convicts 196 supporters of the Pakistan Tehreek-e-Insaf (PTI), including Leader of the Opposition Omar Ayub, six MNAs and a senator and sentences them to up to 10 years' imprisonment over the 2023 Pakistani protests.

=== August ===
- 1 August – Three cars of the Islamabad Express passenger train derail in Kala Shah Kaku, injuring 27 people.
- 5 August – More than 200 PTI supporters are arrested in nationwide rallies to commemorate the 2023 arrest of former prime minister Imran Khan.
- 6 August – Two police officers are killed in an IED attack on their vehicle in Wanna, Khyber Pakhtunkhwa.
- 8 August – Thirty-three Pakistani Taliban militants who attempt to enter the country from Afghanistan are killed in clashes with soldiers in Zhob District, Balochistan.
- 9 August – The Capital Development Authority demolished the Madni Masjid in Islamabad for being an unauthorized structure on a greenbelt, prompting nationwide protests and a subsequent government agreement to reconstruct it at the same site.
- 10 August – Six cars of the Jaffar Express passenger train from Quetta to Peshawar derail following a bomb attack claimed by the BLA on a section of railway in Mastung District, Balochistan.
- 11 August – Seven people are killed in a mudslide in Danyor, Gilgit-Baltistan.
- 12 August –
  - The United States designates the BLA and its armed wing, the Majeed Brigade, as foreign terrorist organizations.
  - A Chinese climber is killed in a rockfall while descending from K2.
- 13 August – Three civilians are killed in a mortar attack on a house in Mamund, Khyber Pakhtunkhwa, during a military operation against the Pakistani Taliban.
- 14 August – Five police officers are killed in militants attacks on police targets across Khyber Pakhtunkhwa, including in Upper Dir District, Lower Dir District and Hassan Khel Tehsil.
- 15 August –
  - A helicopter carrying humanitarian aid to flood victims crashes in Mohmand District, Khyber Pakhtunkhwa, killing all five people on board.
  - At least 340 people are reported killed in flash floods and landslides in Khyber Pakhtunkhwa, Azad Kashmir and Gilgit-Baltistan.
- 18 August – Authorities announce the arrest of a university lecturer on suspicion of plotting a suicide attack on behalf of the BLA targeting Independence Day celebrations in Balochistan.
- 19–20 August – At least 17 people are killed following heavy rains and flooding in Karachi.
- 21 August – An explosion in a firecracker warehouse in Karachi injures 34 people.
- 25 August –
  - India issues an official flood advisory to Pakistan, marking the first official contact between the two countries since the 2025 India–Pakistan conflict in May.
  - Three members of the security forces are killed in an attack on their camp by militants that also leaves one of the attackers dead in Hangu District.
- 27 August – Two soldiers are killed while responding to floods in Punjab.
- 31 August – Four children are injured in a mortar strike on a house in Bajaur District, Khyber Pakhtunkhwa.

=== September ===
- 1 September – A Pakistani Army helicopter crashes during a test landing in Chilas, Gilgit-Baltistan, killing all five on board.
- 2 September –
  - Fifteen people are killed in a suicide bombing at a rally of the Balochistan National Party (Mengal) held at a stadium parking lot in Quetta, Balochistan that is claimed by Islamic State.
  - Six soldiers and six attackers are killed in a suicide attack on a Frontier Corps base in Bannu, Khyber Pakhtunkhwa.
  - Five soldiers are killed in an IED attack on a paramilitary convoy near the Iranian border in Balochistan.
- 6 September – An evacuation boat capsizes during flooding in Multan, killing five people.
- 9–10 September – At least eight people are killed following heavy rains and flooding in Karachi.
- 9 September – An evacuation boat capsizes during flooding along the Indus River in Jalalpur Pirwala, Punjab, killing nine people.
- 10 September – Nineteen Pakistani Taliban members are killed during raids by security forces in Khyber Pakhtunkhwa.
- 13 September – Twelve soldiers and 35 Pakistani Taliban members are killed following two days of raids by security forces in Khyber Pakhtunkhwa.
- 15 September –
  - Thirty-one Pakistani Taliban members are killed following raids by security forces in Khyber Pakhtunkhwa.
  - Five soldiers are killed in a bomb attack in Kech District, Balochistan.
- 17 September – Pakistan and Saudi Arabia sign a mutual defence agreement.
- 18 September –
  - Two members of the security forces are killed in a suicide car bombing in Turbat, Balochistan.
  - Six people are killed in a car bombing in Chaman, Balochistan.
- 21 September – The bodies of three transgender people are found with gunshot wounds along a highway in Murad Memon Goth, Karachi.
- 22 September – At least 24 people, including 10 civilians, are killed in the detonation of bomb-making equipment at a compound operated by the Pakistani Taliban in Tirah, Khyber Pakhtunkhwa.
- 24 September – Thirteen Pakistani Taliban members are killed in a raid by security forces in Dera Ismail Khan.
- 26 September –
  - The federal government orders the closure of five refugee camps hosting Afghan nationals in Khyber Pakhtunkhwa.
  - A bus overturns in Dera Ismail Khan District, Khyber Pakhtunkhwa, killing 11 people and injuring three others.
  - Seventeen Pakistani Taliban members are killed in a raid by security forces in Karak District, Khyber Pakhtunkhwa.
- 27 September – A bus collides with a vehicle transporting oil in Panjgur District, Balochistan, killing eight people.
- 29 September – One person is killed while more than 24 others are injured in a shooting at a peace rally in Muzaffarabad, Azad Kashmir.
- 30 September – A suicide bombing near paramilitary headquarters in Quetta kills 10 people including two military personnel and injures over 30 civilians.

=== October ===
- 1 October –
  - Ten militants are killed in clashes with security forces in Quetta.
  - Four people are killed in clashes between police and protesters demanding subsidies on food and basic utilities in Azad Kashmir.
- 2 October –
  - Thirteen people are killed in two separate road incidents in Balochistan and Karachi.
  - Clashes break out between the Afghan Taliban and Pakistani forces along a section of the Durand Line in Khyber Pakhtunkhwa.
  - Eight people are killed in violent protests in Muzaffarabad against lucrative benefits for the political class in Azad Kashmir.
  - Eight people are injured in a bomb attack on a police vehicle in Peshawar.
- 4 October – A peace agreement is reached by the Azad Kashmir government and civil society groups to end days of violent protests.
- 7 October – Eleven soldiers, including a lieutenant-colonel, are killed in an ambush by Pakistani Taliban militants on a convoy in Orakzai District, Khyber Pakhtunkhwa, that also leaves 19 militants dead.
- 8 October – 2025 political crisis in Khyber Pakhtunkhwa
- 9 October –
  - 2025 Afghanistan–Pakistan conflict: The Afghan Taliban accuses Pakistan of responsibility for an explosion in Kabul.
  - 2025 Tehreek-e-Labbaik Pakistan protests
  - Thirty Pakistani Taliban militants are reported killed in military raids in Orakzai District, Khyber Pakhtunkhwa.
- 10 October –
  - Seven police officers are killed in an attack by gunmen on a police training center in Ratta Kulachi, Khyber Pakhtunkhwa, that also leaves six attackers dead.
  - Five people are killed in clashes between militants and paramilitary forces in Bajaur District, Khyber Pakhtunkhwa.
- 12 October – 2025 Afghanistan–Pakistan conflict: The Afghan Taliban carry out cross-border attacks against Pakistan, resulting in at least 23 deaths among Pakistani forces.
- 13 October – Five people, including a police officer, are killed during clashes with Tehreek-e-Labbaik Pakistan protesters in Lahore.
- 14 October – A police officer escorting polio vaccination workers is shot dead by suspected militants in Matta, Khyber Pakhtunkhwa.
- 15 October – 2025 Afghanistan–Pakistan conflict: The Pakistani military carries out airstrikes on Kabul.
- 16 October – A truck overturns in Swat District, Khyber Pakhtunkhwa, killing 15 people and injuring eight others.
- 17 October – Clashes near the Afghanistan-Pakistan border in Kurram and North Waziristan kill at least five Pakistani soldiers and 25 fighters.
- 19 October –
  - 2025 Afghanistan–Pakistan conflict: Afghanistan and Pakistan agree to an immediate truce after negotiations mediated by Qatar and Turkey.
  - Pakistan successfully launches its first hyperspectral satellite, the H1, into orbit at the Jiuquan Satellite Launch Centre in China.
- 23 October – The federal government bans the Tehreek-e-Labbaik Pakistan after deadly clashes earlier in the month.
- 24 October – Three police officers are killed in a roadside bombing in Hangu, Khyber Pakhtunkhwa.
- 25 October – Pakistan International Airlines resumes flights to the United Kingdom for the first time since the lifting of a 2020 ban over its pilots possessing falsified flying licences.
- 28 October – Six personnel from the National Cyber Crimes Investigation Agency are arrested under the case of bribery.
- 29 October – Six soldiers and seven gunmen are killed in an ambush on a military convoy in Kurram District, Khyber Pakhtunkhwa.

=== November ===
- 4 November – At least 12 people are injured in a gas explosion at a basement canteen at the Supreme Court of Pakistan Building in Islamabad.
- 9 November – Insurgency in Khyber Pakhtunkhwa: At least 20 Pakistani Taliban militants are killed in raids by security forces in Khyber Pakhtunkhwa.
- 10 November – The Senate approves a 27th constitutional amendment to expand Army Chief Asim Munir's powers by creating the position of Chief of Defence Forces with command over all branches of the Pakistan Armed Forces, while also limiting the Supreme Court's authority.
- 10 November – Cadet College Wana attack: At least two attackers are killed in an attempted suicide bombing at a military school in Wana, South Waziristan.
- 11 November – 2025 Islamabad suicide bombing: Twelve people are killed in a suicide bombing outside a district courthouse in Islamabad.
- 13 November – The 27th constitutional amendment is signed into law by President Zardari. Later that day, Justices Mansoor Ali Shah and Athar Minallah resign from the Supreme Court in protest over the amendment's passage.
- 15 November – An explosion at a firecracker factory in Hyderabad, Sindh, kills seven people and injures six others.
- 17 November – Measles & Rubella Initiative, Polio eradication: The government launches a drive to vaccinate 34.5 million children against measles and rubella and 23.3 million children against polio.
- 18 November – Thirty-eight Pakistani Taliban militants are killed in raids by security forces in Khyber Pakhtunkhwa.
- 19 November – Twenty-three Pakistani Taliban militants are killed in raids by security forces in Kurram District, Khyber Pakhtunkhwa.
- 21 November – Eighteen people are killed in a boiler explosion at a glue factory in Faisalabad.
- 24 November – Three suicide bombers attack the Federal Constabulary headquarters in Peshawar, resulting in the deaths of three security personnel and all three attackers.
- 26 November – YouTuber Saad-ur-Rehman is released on bail from imprisonment; he was arrested on 17 August by the National Cyber Crimes Investigation Agency under the case of promoting digital gambling apps.
- 27 November — Three police officers are killed in an attack by militants on a checkpoint in Hangu District, Khyber Pakhtunkhwa.

=== December ===
- 1 December —
  - A police officer is killed in a suicide attack on their vehicle in Lakki Marwat District, Khyber Pakhtunkhwa.
  - A suicide attack claimed by the Balochistan Liberation Front is carried out on a Frontier Corps base in Nok Kundi, Balochistan.
  - The dead body of a toddler is found from a manhole in Karachi after 15 hours of rescue and search operation.
- 2 December – Four people, including a government administrator, are killed in an ambush on a vehicle in Bannu District, Khyber Pakhtunkhwa.
- 3 December – Three police officers are killed in a roadside bombing near Dera Ismail Khan.
- 4 December — Asim Munir is confirmed as Chief of Defence Staff by prime minister Sharif and president Zardari.
- 5 December –
  - Clashes break out between Afghan and Pakistani forces along their common border in Chaman, leaving at least three Pakistanis injured.
  - Muhammad Ali Mirza is released on bail from imprisonment; he was arrested on 26 August under the case of blasphemy in Pakistan.
- 9 December – Six soldiers are killed in an attack on a checkpoint in Kurram District, Khyber Pakhtunkhwa.
- 11 December – A court-martial sentences former Inter-Services Intelligence director-general Faiz Hameed to 14 years' imprisonment for multiple charges including engaging in political activities and violating the Official Secrets Act.
- 15 December – A court in Lahore convicts Tehreek-e-Labbaik Pakistan leader Zaheerul Hassan Shah for inciting violence over his call to kill Chief Justice Qazi Faez Isa and sentences him to 35 years' imprisonment.
- 16 December – A police officer and a civilian are killed in a gun attack on a polio vaccination team in Bajaur District, Khyber Pakhtunkhwa.
- 19 December – Four soldiers are killed in a combined suicide car bombing and gun attack on their post in North Waziristan.
- 20 December – A court in Rawalpindi convicts former prime minister Imran Khan and his wife Bushra Bibi of graft over the retaining and selling state gifts while in office and sentences them to 17 years' imprisonment.
- 23 December –
  - Five police officers are killed in an ambush on their vehicle in Karak District, Khyber Pakhtunkhwa.
  - Arif Habib Corporation is awarded a 75% majority stake at Pakistan International Airlines after submitting a bid of 135 billion rupees ($482 million) at auction.
- 29 December –
  - A teenage girl traveling by bus from Balochistan to Karachi is detained by police in Sindh on suspicion of having been recruited by the BLA to carry out a suicide attack.
  - A military officer and five militants are killed during an security operation in Bajaur District, Khyber Pakhtunkhwa.
  - A police officer is killed in a shooting in Lakki Marwat district, Khyber Pakhtunkhwa.

== Holidays ==
- 5 February – Kashmir Solidarity Day
- 23 March – Pakistan Day
- 31 March – 2 April – Eid al-Fitr
- 1 May – Labour Day
- 16 May – Youm-e-Tashakkur
- 28 May – Youm-e-Takbir
- 7–9 June – Eid al-Adha
- 5–6 July – Ashura
- 14 August – Independence Day
- 6 September – Mawlid and Defence Day
- 9 November – Iqbal Day
- 25 December – Quaid-e-Azam Day

== Arts and entertainment ==
- List of Pakistani submissions for the Academy Award for Best International Feature Film
- List of Pakistani films of 2025

== Deaths ==
- 18 February – Nawab Yousuf Talpur, 82, politician
- 21 February – Shamsuddin Azeemi, 97, scholar
- 22 February – Tahir Mahmood Khan, 68, politician
- 28 February – Hamid Ul Haq Haqqani, 56, politician and scholar
- 3 March – Farooq Hamid, 80, cricketer
- 15 March – Munir Shakir, 55, Islamic cleric, founder of Lashkar-e-Islam
- 17 March – Naseer Soomro, 55, tallest man in Pakistan
- 28 March – Najmuddin Shaikh, 85, diplomat
- 8 April – Taj Haider, 83, politician and mathematician
- 13 April – Javed Kodu, comedian
- 2 June – Sana Yousaf, 17, social media influencer
- 6 June – Abbas Khan Afridi, 54, senator (2009–2018)
- 19 June – Ayesha Khan, 76, actress (body found on this date)
- 8 July – Humaira Asghar, 32, actress (body found on this date)
- 10 November – Arfa Sayeda Zehra, 88, human rights activist
- 10 November – Irfan Siddiqui, senator (since 2021)
- 21 December – Irfan Shafi Khokhar, 45, Punjab MPA (since 2024)
- 27 December – Shamshad Akhtar, 71, minister of finance (2023–2024) and governor of the State Bank of Pakistan (2006–2009)

== See also ==
=== Country overviews ===
- Pakistan
- Economy of Pakistan
- Government of Pakistan
- History of Pakistan
- History of modern Pakistan
- Outline of Pakistan
- Politics of Pakistan
- Years in Pakistan
- Media of Pakistan

=== Related timelines for current period ===
- 2025
- 2020s
- 21st century
