= 2025 Mir Ali attack =

Suicide bombing in Khyber Pakhtunkhwa, Pakistan

- Part of the insurgency in Khyber Pakhtunkhwa
- Location: Khadi, Mir Ali, North Waziristan District, Khyber Pakhtunkhwa, Pakistan
- Date: June 28, 2025 c.6:00 a.m. (PST)
- Target: Soldiers
- Attack type: Suicide bombing, car bombing, vehicle-ramming attack, mass murder
- Weapon: Explosive-laden vehicle
- Deaths: 14 (including the perpetrator)
- Injuries: 29
- Perpetrator: Hafiz Gul Bahadur Group
- No. of participants: 1

On June 28, 2025, a Pakistani Taliban suicide bomber drove an explosive-laden vehicle into a Pakistan Armed Forces convoy before detonating the explosives, killing themself along with 13 soldiers and injuring 29 others, including six children and women.

It was one of the deadliest single-day attacks on security forces in recent months in Khyber Pakhtunkhwa.

== Background ==
Pakistan has witnessed a sharp rise in violence in its regions bordering Afghanistan since the Taliban returned to power in Kabul in 2021, with Islamabad accusing Kabul of allowing its soil to be used for attacks against Pakistan, a claim the Taliban denies. About 290 people, mostly security officials, have been killed in attacks since the start of the year by armed groups fighting the government in both Khyber Pakhtunkhwa and Balochistan, according to an Agence France-Presse tally.

== Attack ==
A suicide bomber rammed their explosive-laden vehicle into a military convoy around lunchtime despite a curfew that had been imposed in the area to facilitate the movement of security forces before detonating it. Footage of the explosion showed bandaged children lying on the floor near shattered glass and debris. The vehicle hit a military truck full of soldiers responsible for disposing bombs and other explosives. The explosion caused the roofs of two houses to collapse, injuring six children, and caused damage to other nearby houses. The death toll was later confirmed to have reached 13 while the number of injuries increased to 29, including 19 civilians.

== Victims ==
Thirteen were killed and 24 others were injured, including 14 civilians. Among the injured were three civilians, two children and an adult, that suffered serious injuries. The thirteen of soldiers were identified as 45-year-old Subedar Zahid Iqbal, 39-year-old Havildar Sohrab Khan, 41-year-old Havildar Mian Yousaf, 34-year-old Naik Khitab Shah, 32-year-old Lance Naik Ismail, 30-year-old Sepoy Rohail, 33-year-old Sepoy Muhammad Ramzan, 30-year-old Sepoy Nawab, 24-year-old Sepoy Zubair Ahmed, 31-year-old Sepoy Muhammad Sahki, 20-year-old Sepoy Hashim Abbasi, 25-year-old Sepoy Muddasir Ejaz and 23-year-old Sepoy Manzar Ali.

== Aftermath ==
An initial probe found that approximately 800 kilograms (1,760 pounds) of explosives were used in the bombing, making it cause severe damage. In response to the attack, 14 militants were killed in subsequent operations.

== Reactions ==
Local media reported the bombing as a terrorist attack.

The Pakistan Armed Forces did not initially comment on the attack. The Inter-Services Public Relations (ISPR), the media wing of the armed forces, later claimed that the Pakistani Taliban and India were linked to the bombing. The Indian Ministry of External Affairs rejected the accusations saying that "the statement deserves contempt". The ISPR also released a statement saying "Thirteen brave sons of [the] soil, embraced shahadat (martyrdom) [and] in this tragic and barbaric incident, two children and a woman [were also] severely injured."

President Asif Ali Zardari condemned the attack and paid tribute to the victims in a statement released from his office. He also paid tribute to the armed forces for killing 14 militants after the attack.

The army chief of staff, Field Marshal Asim Munir, said in a statement that any actions to undermine Pakistan's internal stability would be met with decisive retribution.

Ali Amin Gandapur, the chief minister of Khyber Pakhtunkhwa, condemned the attack.

The Hafiz Gul Bahadur Group, an armed faction of the Pakistani Taliban, claimed responsibility for the attack.

== See also ==
- Terrorist incidents in Pakistan in 2025
- 2025 Darul Uloom Haqqania bombing
- 2025 Jaffar Express hijacking
- 2025 Mastung bus bombing
- 2025 North Waziristan border clashes
- 2025 Machh bombing
- 2025 Waziristan drone strike
- 2025 Khuzdar school bus bombing
