= Ratta =

Ratta may refer to:

== Places ==
- Ratta, Azad Kashmir, a village in Dadyal in the Mirpur District of Azad Kashmir in Pakistan
- Ratta, Punjab, a village in Kallar Kahar Tehsil in the Chakwal district in Punjab province in Pakistan
- Ratta Matta, a town and union council of Jhang District in the Punjab province in Pakistan
- Ratta Kulachi, a town and union council of Dera Ismail Khan District in the Khyber Pakhtunkhwa province in Pakistan

== Other uses ==
- Ratta dynasty, a minor Indian dynasty who ruled over the Belagavi region of modern Karnataka as a branch of Rashtrakutas
- Ratta, the original Japanese name of Raticate, a fictional species of Pokémon
- Ratta (YouTuber) (born 1987; Rathindu Senarathne), a Sri Lankan YouTuber, television actor, director, philanthropist and social media personality
