= Terrorist incidents in Pakistan in 2025 =

This article is about terrorist incidents in Pakistan in 2025 in chronological order.

== January ==
- 4 January – An improvised explosive device (IED) detonated near a military convoy in Turbat, Balochistan, killing a soldier and injuring 35 others.
- 9 January – Sixteen miners were abducted from a vehicle by militants in Lakki Marwat District, Khyber Pakhtunkhwa.
- 10 January – Three people were injured in an IED blast targeting a Frontier Corps truck in Chaman, Balochistan.
- 16 January – Five people were killed in an attack on a humanitarian aid convoy in Kurram District, Khyber Pakhtunkhwa.
- 28 January – Two soldiers and five militants were killed in an attack on a security outpost in Killa Abdullah District, Balochistan.

== February ==
- 1 February –
  - Eighteen members of the Frontier Corps were killed in an attack by the Balochistan Liberation Army on their vehicle near Mangochar, Kalat District, Balochistan. Twenty-four attackers were also reported to have been killed.
  - Five people, including four members of the security forces, were killed in an attack by militants on their vehicle in Khyber Pakhtunkhwa.
- 3 February – A police officer escorting polio vaccination workers was killed in an ambush by unidentified gunmen in Jamrud, Khyber Pakhtunkhwa.
- 6 February – A militant assault on a police post in Karak, Khyber Pakhtunkhwa, killed three police officers and injured five others.
- 14 February – A roadside bomb targeted a vehicle carrying coal miners in Harnai, Balochistan, killing 11 and injuring five.
- 17 February – A convoy of aid trucks in Kurram District was ambushed, killing a driver and a security official, and injuring 15 others.
- 18 February – Four soldiers responding to the attack on the aid convoy in Kurram District the previous day were killed in an ambush by militants.
- 19 February –
  - Seven people were killed in an attack by gunmen on a bus in Barkhan District, Balochistan. The Balochistan Liberation Army subsequently claimed responsibility.
  - A police officer escorting polio vaccination workers was killed in an ambush by unidentified gunmen in Bajaur, Khyber Pakhtunkhwa.
- 21 February – Six militants were killed in a raid by security forces in Karak District, Khyber Pakhtunkhwa.
- 23 February – Security forces killed seven militants in two separate operations in Dera Ismail Khan District, Khyber Pakhtunkhwa.
- 24 February – Ten militants were killed in a raid by security forces in Bagh, Khyber Pakhtunkhwa.
- 28 February –
  - 2025 Darul Uloom Haqqania bombing: A suicide bombing during Friday prayers in Darul Uloom Haqqania in Akora Khattak, Khyber Pakhtunkhwa, killed Hamid Ul Haq Haqqani and six others.
  - Two people were killed in a roadside bombing near a pharmacy in Orakzai District, Khyber Pakhtunkhwa.
  - Ten people, including two soldiers, were injured in a roadside bombing on a vehicle carrying members of the security forces in Quetta.

== March ==
- 3 March – A woman blew herself up beside a Frontier Corps vehicle in Kalat, Balochistan, killing another person and injuring three others.
- 4 March – Eighteen people were killed in a combined suicide bombing and assault on a military base in Bannu, Khyber Pakhtunkhwa, that was claimed by the Pakistani Taliban affiliate Jaish Al-Fursan.
- 11 March – 2025 Jaffar Express hijacking: Balochistan Liberation Army militants blew up railway tracks and hijacked the Jaffar Express train bound from Quetta to Peshawar taking 450 people hostages including both security personnel and civilians.
- 15 March – Munir Shakir, the founder of Lashkar-e-Islam, was killed in a bomb attack in Peshawar.
- 16 March – The BLA attacked a Frontier Corps convoy in Noshki, Balochistan, killing five people, including three soldiers. The attack involved an explosion followed by a suicide bombing. Security forces killed four attackers in retaliation.

== April ==
- 15 April –
  - April 2025 Mastung Bus Bombing: A bus carrying personnel from the Pakistani security forces was targeted with an improvised explosive device, resulting in the deaths of three soldiers and injuries to twenty others. The Islamic State – Khorasan Province, a regional affiliate of the Islamic State, claimed responsibility for the attack.
  - Two polio vaccination workers were abducted by unidentified gunmen in Dera Ismail Khan.
- 18 April – A member of the Ahmadiyya community was killed in an attack by a suspected Islamist mob in Karachi.
- 23 April – Two security escorts for polio workers were killed in a gun attack in Mastung District, Balochistan.
- 25 April –
  - Four Frontier Corps (FC) personnel were killed and three others injured in a bomb blast in the Margate area of Quetta. The explosion occurred during a bomb disposal operation involving an improvised explosive device (IED).
  - A member of the Ahmadiyya community was killed in a shooting in Bhulair, Punjab.
- 27 April – 2025 North Waziristan border clashes: Seventy-one Pakistani Taliban militants trying to enter the country from the Afghanistan border were killed by security forces in North Waziristan.
- 28 April – Seven people were killed in a bomb attack outside the office of a peace committee in Wana, South Waziristan.

== May ==
- 6 May – Seven soldiers were killed in a bomb attack on a military vehicle in Machh, Kachhi District, Balochistan. The Baloch Liberation Army claimed responsibility for the attack.
- 11 May – Two police officers were killed in a bomb attack on their vehicle in Peshawar.
- 16 May – A doctor belonging to the Ahmadiyya community was shot dead at a hospital in Sargodha.
- 18 May – Four people were killed in a car bombing near a market in Killa Abdullah District, Balochistan.
- 19 May – 2025 Waziristan drone strike: Four children were killed in a suspected drone strike in Mir Ali, Khyber Pakhtunkhwa.
- 21 May – 2025 Khuzdar school bus bombing: A suicide bomber drove an explosive-laden vehicle into a school bus transporting students of the Army Public School, killing eight people, including 4 children and injuring 53 others.
- 27 May – A police officer escorting polio vaccination workers was killed in a shooting in Nushki District, Balochistan.
- 30 May – A government official was killed in an attack claimed by the BLA on Surab, Balochistan.

== June ==
- 18 June – A railway track explosion near Jacobabad, Sindh, derailed several bogies of the Jaffar Express.
- 28 June – 2025 Mir Ali attack: A suicide bomber from the Hafiz Gul Bahadur Group drove an explosive-laden vehicle into a Pakistan Armed Forces convoy in Mir Ali, North Waziristan, killing between 13 and 16 soldiers and injuring several others, including civilians.

== July ==
- 1 July – One civilian was killed in an attack by gunmen on a police station and two banks in Mastung District, Balochistan.
- 2 July – Five government officials, including an assistant commissioner, were killed while 11 others were injured in a roadside bomb attack on their vehicle in Bajaur District, Khyber Pakhtunkhwa.
- 9–11 July – The Balochistan Liberation Front launched Operation Baam.
- 10 July – Nine people were abducted and killed by gunmen from several buses in Balochistan.
- 16 July – Three people were killed in a gun attack on a bus in Kalat District, Balochistan.
- 19 July – One Army Major was killed and three civilians were injured in a bomb blast in Quetta.
- 27 July – Seven people were killed in a gun attack on a protest rally in Tirah, Khyber Pakhtunkhwa.

== August ==
- 6 August – Two police officers were killed in an IED attack on their vehicle in Wanna, Khyber Pakhtunkhwa.
- 10 August – Six cars of the Jaffar Express passenger train from Quetta to Peshawar derailed following a bomb attack claimed by the BLA on a section of railway in Mastung District, Balochistan.
- 12 August – The United States designated the BLA and its armed wing, the Majeed Brigade, as foreign terrorist organizations.
- 13 August – Three civilians were killed in a mortar attack on a house in Mamund, Khyber Pakhtunkhwa, during a military operation against the Pakistani Taliban in Bajaur District.
- 14 August – Five police officers were killed in militants attacks on police targets across Khyber Pakhtunkhwa, including in Upper Dir District, Lower Dir District and Hassan Khel Tehsil.
- 18 August – Authorities announced the arrest of a university lecturer on suspicion of plotting a suicide attack on behalf of the BLA targeting Independence Day celebrations in Balochistan.
- 25 August – Three members of the security forces were killed, while 17 others were injured in an attack on their camp by militants that also left one of the attackers dead in Hangu District.
- 31 August – Four children were injured in a mortar strike on a house in Bajaur District, Khyber Pakhtunkhwa.

== September ==
- 2 September –
  - Fifteen people are killed in a suicide bombing at a rally of the Balochistan National Party (Mengal) held at a stadium parking lot in Quetta, Balochistan that was claimed by Islamic State.
  - Six soldiers and six attackers were killed in a suicide attack on a Frontier Corps base in Bannu, Khyber Pakhtunkhwa.
  - Five soldiers were killed in an IED attack on a paramilitary convoy in Balochistan.
- 13 September – Twelve soldiers and 35 Pakistani Taliban members were killed following two days of raids by security forces in Khyber Pakhtunkhwa.
- 15 September – Five soldiers including a captain were killed in an IED blast near Sher Bandi in Kech District, Balochistan.
- 18 September –
  - Two members of the security forces were killed in a suicide car bombing in Turbat, Balochistan.
  - Six people were killed in a car bombing in Chaman, Balochistan.
- 29 September – One person was killed while more than 24 others were injured in a shooting at a peace rally in Muzaffarabad, Azad Kashmir.
- 30 September – A suicide bombing near paramilitary headquarters in Quetta killed 10 including two military personnel and injured over 30 civilians.

== October ==
- 2 October – Eight people, including four police officers, were injured in a bomb attack on a police vehicle in Peshawar.
- 7 October – Eleven soldiers, including a lieutenant-colonel, were killed in an ambush by Pakistani Taliban militants on a convoy in Orakzai District, Khyber Pakhtunkhwa, that also left 19 militants dead.
- 10 October – Seven police officers were killed in an attack by gunmen on a police training center in Ratta Kulachi, Khyber Pakhtunkhwa, that also left six attackers dead.
- 14 October – A police officer escorting polio vaccination workers was shot dead by suspected militants in Matta, Khyber Pakhtunkhwa.
- 17 October – Seven soldiers where killed while 13 were injured in a suicide attack on a military outpost in North Waziristan that was claimed by Hafiz Gul Bahadur Group.
- 24 October – Three police officers are killed in a roadside bombing in Hangu, Khyber Pakhtunkhwa.
- 29 October – At least six soldiers, including a Captain, were killed in an IED blast targeting a convoy of the security forces in Kurram District, Khyber Pakhtunkhwa.

== November ==
- 10 November – Cadet College Wana attack: Two attackers were killed in an attempted suicide bombing at a military school in Wana, South Waziristan.
- 11 November – 2025 Islamabad suicide bombing: A suicide attack on a district court in Islamabad killed 12 people and injured 27 others. Jamaat-ul-Ahrar, a faction of the Pakistani Taliban, claimed responsibility.
- 24 November – Three suicide bombers attacked the Federal Constabulary headquarters in Peshawar, resulting in the deaths of three security personnel and all three attackers.
- 27 November — Three police officers were killed in an attack by militants on a checkpoint in Hangu District, Khyber Pakhtunkhwa.

== December ==
- 1 December —
  - A police officer was killed in a suicide attack on their vehicle in Lakki Marwat District, Khyber Pakhtunkhwa.
  - A suicide attack claimed by the Balochistan Liberation Front was carried out on a Frontier Corps base in Nok Kundi, Balochistan.
- 2 December – Four people, including a government administrator and two guards, were killed in an ambush on a vehicle in Bannu District, Khyber Pakhtunkhwa.
- 3 December – Three police officers were killed in a roadside bombing near Dera Ismail Khan.
- 9 December – Six soldiers were killed in an attack on a checkpoint in Kurram District, Khyber Pakhtunkhwa.
- 15 December – A soldier belonging to the Special Service Group was killed during a counter-insurgency operation in Dera Ismail Khan District. Seven militants were also killed.
- 16 December – A police officer and a civilian were killed in a gun attack on a polio vaccination team in Bajaur District, Khyber Pakhtunkhwa.
- 19 December – Four soldiers were killed in a combined suicide car bombing and gun attack on their post in North Waziristan.
- 23 December – Five police officers were killed in an attack on their vehicle in Karak District, Khyber Pakhtunkhwa.
- 29 December –
  - A teenage girl traveling by bus from Balochistan to Karachi was detained by police in Sindh on suspicion of having been recruited by the BLA to carry out a suicide attack.
  - A major-ranked officer was killed during an intelligence-based operation (IBO) in Bajaur District, Khyber Pakhtunkhwa that also left five militants dead.
  - A police assistant sub inspector was killed in a gun attack in the Wanda Jogi area of Lakki Marwat district, Khyber Pakhtunkhwa.

== See also ==
- 2025 in Pakistan
- Terrorist incidents in Pakistan in 2024
- Terrorist incidents in Pakistan in 2026
