= Katlang drone strike =

Military operation in Katlang, Pakistan

Katlang drone airstrike
- Part of Insurgency in Khyber Pakhtunkhwa
- Date: 29 March 2025
- Location: Katlang Tehsil, Mardan District, Khyber Pakhtunkhwa, Pakistan
- Type: Military operation
- Cause: Targeting suspected Tehreek-e-Taliban Pakistan (TTP) militants
- Participants: Pakistani security forces, suspected TTP militants
- Outcome: Civilian casualties and protests; government inquiry announced
- Deaths: 9 civilians (disputed), 17 militants (claimed by military)

The Katlang drone airstrike was a military action carried out by Pakistani security forces on 29 March 2025, in the Katlang Tehsil of Mardan District, Khyber Pakhtunkhwa. The operation targeted suspected militants but resulted in civilian casualties, sparking widespread controversy and protests. The majority of those killed were adult men, with only two women among the casualties and no children present.

== Background ==
Pakistan has experienced a surge in militant activity, particularly in Khyber Pakhtunkhwa and Balochistan, following the breakdown of a ceasefire between the government and the Tehreek-e-Taliban Pakistan (TTP) in November 2022. The TTP had announced a "spring campaign" of attacks, including planned strikes, prompting preemptive military operations.

== Operation ==
=== Military claims ===
The Pakistani military stated that the operation was based on "credible intelligence" regarding TTP militants using the remote Katlang mountains as a hideout and transit point. And stressed that the nearest urban settlements are 6-9 kilometers away, reducing the possibility of mutual harm.

Federal Information Minister Attaullah Tarar claimed 17 militants (described as "Khawarij") were killed, denying civilian harm and clarifying that no drone was used—instead, it was a ground operation by security forces.

=== Civilian and local reports ===
According to civilian and local reports, nine civilians, including two women and two children from a shepherd family, were killed in the strike. The victims belonged to the Gujjar community and were seasonally migrating from Swat District to Mardan with their livestock.

Locals and KP government officials disputed the military’s claims, stating the victims were unarmed civilians and condemning the strike as a drone attack.

Protests erupted in Swat, with demonstrators blocking the Swat Motorway and demanding justice.

== Government response ==
The KP government, led by Chief Minister Ali Amin Gandapur, ordered a high-level inquiry and announced Rs. 5 million compensation for each victim’s family.

KP government spokesman, Barrister Muhammad Ali Saif, stressed that the province would not tolerate such actions in the future, indicating a strong stance against unauthorized or indiscriminate drone strikes.

The federal government maintained that the operation was necessary to preempt an Eid-ul-Fitr attack in Mardan, accusing the PTI-led KP administration of sympathizing with militants.

== Controversies ==
The disputed nature of the strike, security forces denied using drones, locals and some officials insisted it was a drone strike. Federal Minister Attaullah Tarar accused PTI of spreading "fake news" about a drone attack to undermine the military.
