= 2025 Islamabad suicide bombing =

Bombing in Islamabad, Pakistan

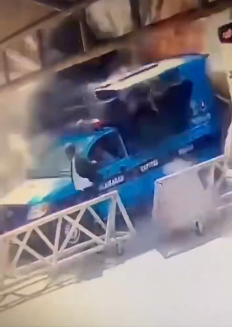
- A closed-circuit television camera still of the explosion
- Location: 33°39′51.3″N 73°0′24″E; G-11/4 sector, Islamabad, Pakistan
- Date: 11 November 2025; ~12:30 p.m. PKT (UTC+05:00)
- Target: District Judicial Complex (failed); Islamabad Police vehicle (successful)
- Attack type: Suicide bombing, mass murder
- Deaths: 13 (including the perpetrator)
- Injuries: 36
- Perpetrators: Pakistani Taliban; Jamaat-ul-Ahrar
- No. of participants: 1

On 11 November 2025, a suicide bomber set off an explosion outside of the District Judicial Complex in Islamabad, the capital of Pakistan, killing 12 people and injuring 36, after attempting to enter the structure. Jamaat-ul-Ahrar, a faction of the internationally designated terrorist group Tehrik-e-Taliban Pakistan (TTP), claimed responsibility for the attack. It was the deadliest attack in Islamabad in nearly a decade until the February 2026 Islamabad mosque bombing.

== Background ==
After 2001, the Pakistan military launched a series of military offensives against terrorist groups in the Federally Administered Tribal Areas (FATA). Many terrorists belonging to various terrorist groups were killed. However, some militants managed to flee to Afghanistan, where they continue to launch attacks on Pakistan military posts located near the border. In 2017, Afghanistan's Chief Executive Abdullah Abdullah admitted that Tehrik-e-Taliban Pakistan (TTP) has a foothold in Afghanistan. In 2019, the United States Department of Defense claimed that about 3,000 to 5,000 terrorists belonging to TTP are in Afghanistan.

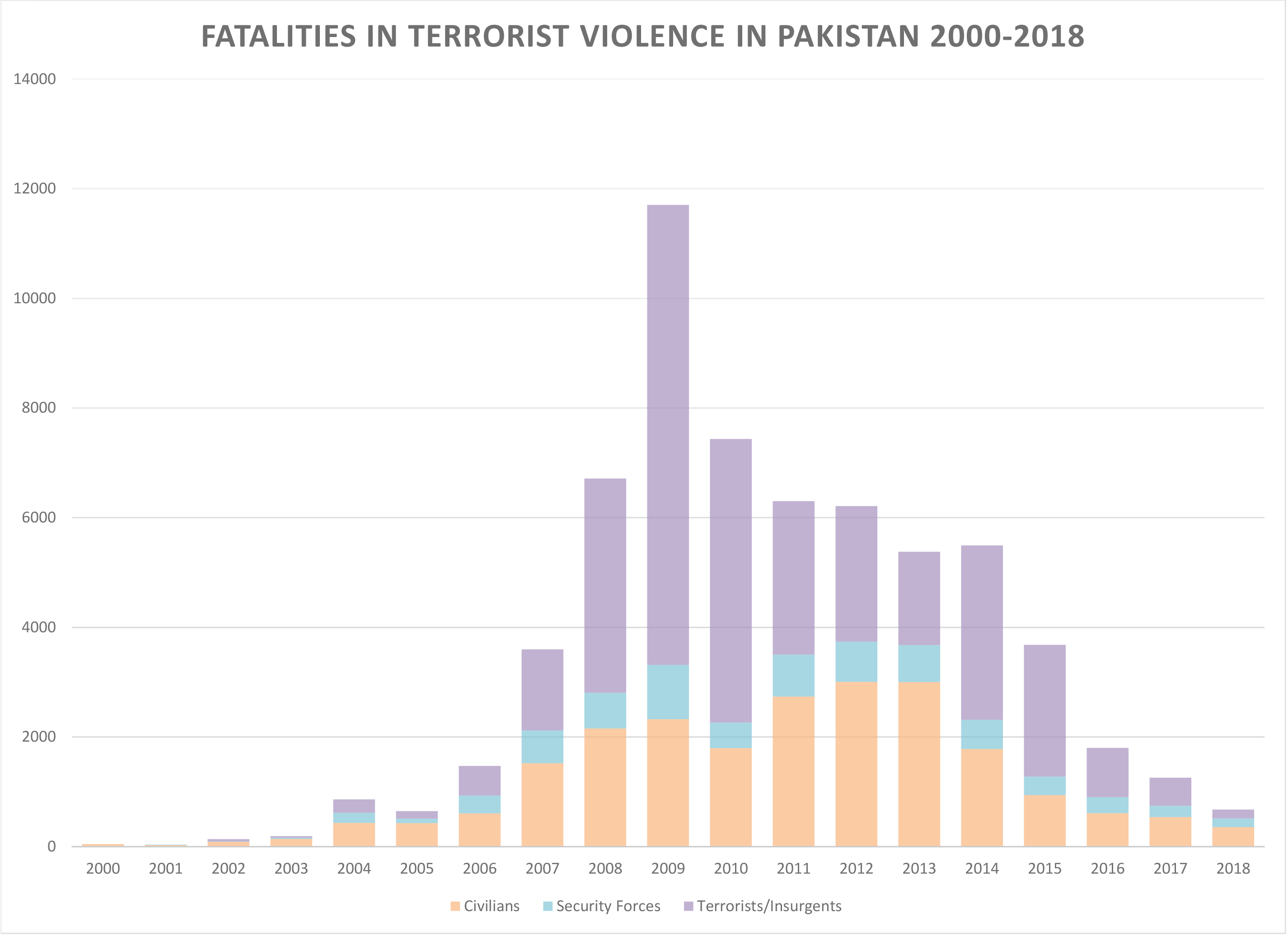
Fatalities in terrorist violence in Pakistan, (2000–2018)

According to a report by Brown University's Watson Institute for International and Public Affairs, 23,372 Pakistani civilians and 8,832 Pakistani security personnel were killed in the war on terrorism. Moreover, according to the Government of Pakistan, the direct and indirect economic costs of terrorism from 2000 to 2010 total $68 billion. In 2018, Pakistani newspaper Dawn News reported that the Pakistani economy suffered a total loss of $126.79 billion since 2001 due to the war on terror.

Pakistani officials often blame India and Afghanistan for supporting terrorism in Pakistan, which India has denied. However, Afghanistan has admitted to providing support for terrorist groups such as the TTP. In 2013, the United States conducted a raid on an Afghan convoy that was taking Latif Mehsud, a senior commander of the TTP, to Kabul. Afghan president Hamid Karzai's spokesperson, Aimal Faizi, told reporters that the National Directorate of Security (NDS) was working with Latif. Latif was a conduit for funding to TTP. Some of the funding for TTP might have come from NDS. Former NDS head Asadullah Khalid posted a video belonging to TTP on his Twitter account where he claimed that the Badaber Camp attack was tit for tat. However, the conflict between Afghanistan and Pakistan intensified after the Taliban, an ally of the TTP, regained power in Afghanistan since 2021.

As of 2022, most terrorist activities in Pakistan have been concentrated in the provinces of Khyber Pakhtunkhwa and Balochistan. Khyber Pakhtunkhwa accounted for 64% of the reported casualties (633 fatalities in 2022), followed by 26% in Balochistan, 5.8% in Sindh and 2.8% in Punjab and 1.6% in Azad Kashmir and Gilgit Baltistan.

On 4 January 2025 a mini rocket hit a police station in I-9 sector.

On 10 November 2025, terrorists tried to attack a cadet college in Wana, but were killed by security forces without inflicting any major casualties and students and teachers being safely evacuated.

== Bombing ==
A little after 12:30 p.m. PKT, the bomber attempted to enter the gates of the court complex in the G-11 sector of Islamabad, located adjacent to the Srinagar Highway. According to officials, he waited for approximately 10 to 15 minutes near the entrance after failing to get into the building, then detonated the bomb close to an Islamabad Police vehicle parked outside the gates. Footage showed people covered in blood on the ground, with vehicles and windows damaged.

== Aftermath ==
As of 11 November 2025, sources report 12–13 people killed and upwards of 27–36 injured. Victims included passing civilians, some of whom were present for court appointments, typically drawing hundreds of visitors. Witnesses described ensuing panic, with the blast being heard from miles away. A lawyer inside the court's cafeteria said the blast blew him from his chair, believing that "the number of casualties could have been much higher" should the attacker have detonated the explosive inside the courtroom.

More than a dozen individuals were taken away from the scene by ambulances to the Pakistan Institute of Medical Sciences. Doctors there claimed the death toll could rise. Police cordoned off the area of the attack shortly after the bombing as plumes of smoke rose from the street. Forensics teams searched through debris for further evidence. They found the severed head of the attacker, which was found nearby, confirming the nature of the attack. CCTV footage also confirmed the blast came from an attacker.

Jamaat-ul-Ahrar, a faction of the TTP, claimed responsibility for the attack. The TTP itself officially denied involvement in the attack. In a statement, the TTP said, "Judges, lawyers and officials who carried out rulings under Pakistan's un-Islamic laws were targeted." They said that attacks would continue until the Pakistani government adopts Sharia law.

An investigation was opened a day after the attack. Seven suspects were arrested in Rawalpindi following the bombing. On 13 November, interior minister Mohsin Naqvi said that the suicide bomber was an Afghan national.

Following the attack, eight members of the Sri Lanka national cricket team, which was in Pakistan for a one-day international series and a subsequent T20 tri-series, requested to leave the country, citing security concerns. Following consultations with Pakistani authorities, Sri Lanka Cricket announced that the team would continue playing in the country and threatened disciplinary action against cricketers who left. The tri-series matches, which were originally to have been held partially in Lahore, were moved entirely to Rawalpindi.

== Analysis ==
Analyst Adam Weinstein of the Quincy Institute for Responsible Statecraft noted that the bombing represented one of the first attacks in Islamabad since the resurgence of the insurgency in Khyber Pakhtunkhwa starting from 2021. With its added security compared to the northwest, he regarded attacks in the capital as "the ultimate litmus test. If Islamabad isn't safe, nowhere is."

== Reactions ==
=== Domestic ===
Prime Minister Shehbaz Sharif and President Asif Ali Zardari publicly condemned the attacks. Sharif vowed that the perpetrators would face justice.

Defence minister Khawaja Asif declared the country was in a "state of war" following the attack, and described the incident as a "wake-up call". Minister of the Interior Naqvi stated that the attack was "carried out by Indian-backed elements and Afghan Taliban proxies" linked to the Pakistani Taliban. The official X account of the Pakistani government claimed that the explosion, along with the Cadet College Wana attack near the Afghanistan–Pakistan border, the day before, were the "worst examples of Indian state terrorism in the region". The post quoted Shehbaz Sharif as blaming India for the attacks.

=== International ===
- Afghanistan: Taliban spokesperson Zabihullah Mujahid, said that Afghanistan does "not want insecurity in the region, and entering into war is not our first choice." Mujahid added that in case that an escalation occurs, Afghanistan has a "right to defend itself".
- India: The Indian government denied any involvement in the attack. A Ministry of External Affairs spokesperson said, "India unequivocally rejects the baseless and unfounded allegations being made by an obviously delirious Pakistani leadership."

== See also ==
- 2025 Delhi car explosion, which happened a day before in neighboring India
- September 2025 Quetta bombing
- List of terrorist incidents in Pakistan
- Terrorist incidents in Pakistan in 2025
