= 2025 Karachi building collapse =

Residential building collapse in Pakistan

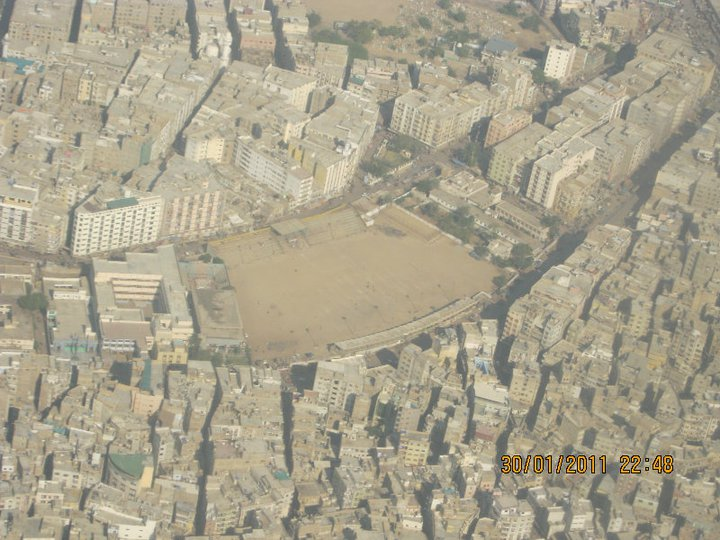
- Aerial view of Lyari, Karachi
- Date: 4 July 2025
- Time: 10:00 AM PKT (UTC+5)
- Location: Baghdadi, Lyari, Karachi, Sindh, Pakistan; 24.8600°N 66.9960°E
- Cause: Structural failure of deteriorated and illegally modified building
- Participants: Residents of Fotan Mansion
- Deaths: 27
- Injuries: 10+
- Arrests: 9 (including 8 SBCA officials and the building owner)

The 2025 Karachi building collapse was a fatal structural failure that occurred on 4 July 2025 in the Lyari area of Karachi, Sindh, Pakistan. A five-storey residential structure, locally known as Fotan Mansion, collapsed in a narrow inner street of Baghdadi, resulting in the deaths of at least 27 people, including women and children, and injuring many more. Rescue operations continued for three days, with the final body recovered on 6 July 2025.

== Background ==
Fotan Mansion was situated in the Ramaswami Quarters of Lyari, a densely populated and historically under-resourced neighbourhood.

Constructed in the 1990s, the building had shown visible signs of structural deterioration and was declared hazardous by the Sindh Building Control Authority (SBCA) as early as 2023. Despite multiple evacuation notices, including one issued in late June 2025, approximately 12 families continued to reside in the building at the time of the collapse.

== Collapse ==
On the morning of 4 July 2025, at approximately 10:00 am, Fotan Mansion suddenly collapsed onto a narrow street. Local residents reported hearing loud cracking or shaking noises shortly before the structure gave way. The collapse immediately trapped dozens of residents under rubble. Rescue teams from the Pakistan Army, Sindh Rangers, Rescue 1122, Chhipa Welfare Association and the Edhi Foundation, along with police and local volunteers, rushed to the site. Workers used heavy machinery to remove debris, though narrow access routes slowed efforts. Initial efforts recovered at least six bodies within hours, with a further ten recovered overnight, bringing the death toll to sixteen by 5 July. Rescue teams continued working into the weekend, ultimately recovering 27 bodies by 6 July, and treating at least 10 injured people, one of whom later died in hospital. The search operation concluded late on 6 July, and the area was declared clear of survivors.

== Victims ==
The collapse killed at least 27 people. Authorities confirmed that ten individuals were rescued alive. One resident lost seven family members and said "We've lost our home, our people. I don't know how we'll start again".

Many had lived in the building for years, renting small apartments due to lack of affordable housing elsewhere. In addition to the confirmed deaths, around 50 families from surrounding buildings were displaced due to the risk of further collapse. These families were temporarily relocated to shelters and school buildings as officials conducted inspections on neighbouring structures. Survivors were also offered food supplies, shelter, and short-term accommodation, though many expressed concern about long-term resettlement.

== Investigation ==
A formal First Information Report (FIR) was registered at the Baghdadi police station, naming nine SBCA officials and the building owner on charges of manslaughter, criminal negligence, falsifying records, and obstructing enforcement duties. Sindh Police arrested eight SBCA directors and deputy directors, as well as the building owner. One official was exempt from arrest for health reasons.

The FIR alleges that SBCA personnel, from 2022 to 2025, were aware of the building's deteriorating state but failed to mark it as unfit or ensure its evacuation. It further claims the owner continued renting the premises despite its known risk. An inquiry committee, chaired by the Commissioner of Karachi and appointed by Chief Minister Murad Ali Shah, began investigations immediately. In response, Sindh authorities suspended SBCA Director General Ishaq Khuhro, replacing him with Shahmir Khan Bhutto. The Sindh High Court approved inquiry instructed the inspection of 588 unsafe buildings in Karachi, including 51 high-risk structures in Lyari, and led to arrest warrants and FIRs for illegal construction linked to broader graft allegations. Authorities also initiated steps to demolish seriously dangerous buildings and review SBCA's rules and eviction processes, aiming to prevent similar tragedies.

== Response ==
The Sindh government announced financial compensation of PKR 1 million for each deceased individual and PKR 300,000 for the injured. Additional relief included temporary housing and promised plots for reconstruction.

Shah ordered inspections of all dangerous buildings and warned that negligence would not be tolerated. Sindh Governor Kamran Tessori expressed grief, called the incident unacceptable, and announced support for affected families, including housing and ration aid. President Asif Ali Zardari offered condolences and instructed the Sindh government to conduct an immediate inquiry. Prime Minister Shehbaz Sharif expressed sorrow over the loss of lives and urged swift rescue operations.

PPP chairman Bilawal Bhutto Zardari assured that the Sindh government would fully assist the victims. Sindh Minister Saeed Ghani announced compensation of Rs 1 million for families of the deceased and Rs 300,000 for the injured. Senior Minister Sharjeel Inam Memon confirmed plans to demolish 51 severely dangerous buildings and assess over 700 more across Sindh. Major opposition parties criticised the Sindh government for its failure to act despite prior warnings.

== See also ==
- 2023 Karachi factory fire
- List of building and structure collapses
- 2025 in Pakistan
