= Javed Kodu =

Pakistani television and film actor (died 2025)

- جاوید کوڈو
- Born: 7 January 1960
- Died: 13 April 2025; Lahore, Punjab, Pakistan
- Other name: Kodu
- Occupations: Actor; Comedian
- Children: 3

Javed Kodu (Urdu: جاوید کوڈو) (died 13 April 2025) was a Pakistani stage, television and film actor. He was born with dwarfism. He was called Kodu due to his short stature, this name was given to him by Akhtar Hussain Albela.

Kodu died in Lahore on 13 April 2025. The Speaker of the National Assembly of Pakistan Ayaz Sadiq, Minister Azma Bukhari, and Prime Minister Shehbaz Sharif expressed their sorrow over his death.

== Career ==
Kodu started his career in 1981 with stage play "Sauday Baaz". He appeared in more than 150 Punjabi and Urdu films, and television programmes.

== Filmography ==
=== Television ===
- Khuwahish
- Ainak Wala Jin
- 1997 - Ashiyana
- Khabarnaak

=== Film ===
- 1992 - Hero
- 1992 - Boxer
- 1993 - Jadoo Nagri
- 1999 - Desan Da Raja
- 2004 - Pagari Sanmbhal Jatta
