= September 2025 Quetta bombing =

Terrorist attack in Balochistan, Pakistan

2025 Quetta bombing
- Part of the insurgency in Balochistan
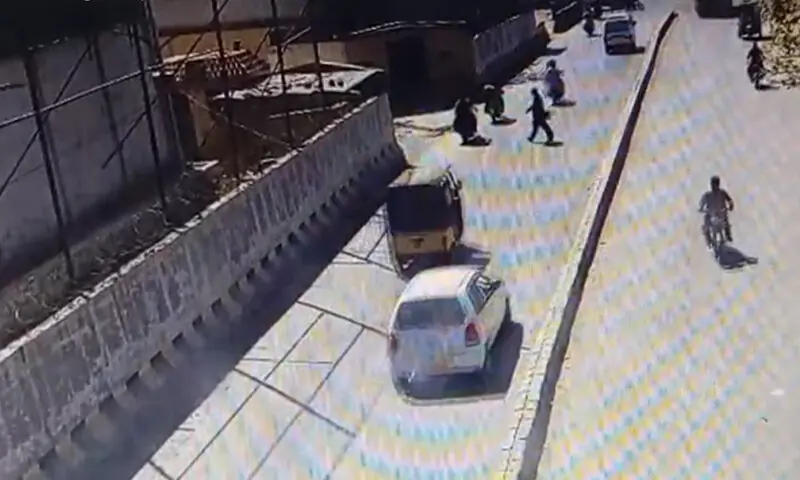
- CCTV still of Pishin Road seconds before the explosion (Note: The explosive-laden vehicle driving along the Pishin Stop road is seen turning into a driveway/road moments before detonating.)
- Location: 30°12′13.6″N 67°0′18.7″E: Federal Constabulary headquarters; Quetta, Balochistan, Pakistan
- Date: 30 September 2025; 11:33:46 a.m. PKT (UTC+05:00)
- Attack type: Car bombing, mass murder, suicide attack
- Deaths: 16 (including 6 perpetrators)
- Injuries: ~32
- Perpetrator: Unknown
- No. of participants: 6

A terrorist attack occurred in the city of Quetta, Balochistan, Pakistan on 30 September 2025, when a suicide bomber detonated an explosives-laden vehicle outside the Frontier Constabulary (FC) headquarters. Following the blast, a group of armed militants engaged security forces in a shootout. The terrorist attack killed at least 10 people and injured over 30 others. All six attackers were also killed.

No group claimed responsibility immediately after the attack. However, an anonymous counterterrorism intelligence officer indicated that the attack sought to target the regional headquarters of the Frontier Corps, the local paramilitary force.

== Bombing ==
The suicide bomber, dressed in FC uniform, drove a Suzuki van into the driveway of the FC headquarters located in Quetta, Balochistan (Note: Some immediate sources report that the bomb detonated on Zarghun road. Others said it detonated on Pishin Stop road. The CCTV camera which captured the attack read "Pashin Bus Stop2-2.") in the late morning of 30 September 2025. According to Senior Superintendent of Police (SSP) Special Operations Quetta Muhammad Baloch, the vehicle turned from Model Town towards Hali Road, near the FC building, before ramming into an exterior wall of it.

Five militants, dressed in civilian clothes, exited the vehicle and immediately engaged in a heavy firefight with security forces. They then infiltrated the building. A CCTV camera showed that the bomb detonated at 11:33:46 a.m., after which gunfire continued. (Note: The exact timing of the blast can be seen in the CCTV camera's time overlay, which is consistent with estimates provided by sources.)

Soon after, gunfire died down. Pakistani Minister of the Interior Mohsin Naqvi later reported that all six insurgents involved in the attack were killed by security forces. Credible estimates claim that of those killed, four were FC personnel and six were civilians, although the ration between civilians and security forces killed vary by one in each direction. Most of the civilians killed were in a passing bus and rickshaw.

== Aftermath ==
Ambulances quickly rushed to the location of the attack, rushing injured and killed to nearby hospitals. Balochistan Health Minister Bakht Muhammad Kakar reported that five individuals were killed on impact and five more later succumbed to their injuries. Following the attacks, Kakar and the Health Secretary Mujeebur Rehman declared emergencies in Civil Hospital Quetta, BMC Hospital, and the Trauma Centre as all personnel were on duty. Although the attack seemed to target the FC headquarters, Kakar reported that most of those killed and injured were civilians. He said that the death toll could rise further. Six civilians were in critical condition.

Balochistan's Chief Minister Mir Sarfraz Bugti, speaking at an event in Quetta, claimed that "an operation against the terrorists is underway."

The explosion shattered the windows of numerous nearby buildings and shook the neighborhood. It was said that the blast could be heard from over 10 miles away. Local sources says that panic ensued in the area.

== Response ==
=== Experts ===
Iftikhar Firdous, a security expert and co-founder of the Islamabad-based region security publication, Khorasan Diary, said that the attack was "nothing new" but underscored that it demonstrates the ability for militants to strike the heart of cities.

=== Domestic ===
==== Government ====
Balochistan's Chief Minister, Mir Sarfraz Bugti condemned the attack, claiming the incident as a "terrorist attack." At the time of his comment, he confirmed the deaths of at least four attackers, killed by security forces.

President of Pakistan Asif Ali Zardari condemned the attack, claiming that it was a "suicide attack" carried out by Fitna Al Khwarij (the Pakistani Taliban or TTP). He praised the swift action taken by security forces, saying "“Pakistan, its people & its security forces shall prevail, Insha Allah."

=== International ===
- Russia: The Russian embassy condemned the attack by stating “We emphasised the need to combat terrorism in all its forms and manifestations, and we hope that those who organised and perpetrated this attack will be identified and brought to justice". They also stated that "We expressed our condolences to the families of the victims and wish all those injured a speedy recovery".

== See also ==
- List of terrorist incidents in Pakistan
- Terrorist incidents in Pakistan in 2025
