= 2025 North Waziristan border clashes =

Border clash between Pakistani forces and militants in April 2025

April 2025 North Waziristan border clash
- Part of Insurgency in Khyber Pakhtunkhwa
- Location: North Waziristan, Khyber Pakhtunkhwa, Pakistan
- Date: 27 April 2025
- Target: Pakistani border security forces
- Attack type: Armed clash
- Weapons: Small arms, explosives
- Deaths: 54 militants
- Perpetrator: Militants (allegedly linked to Tehrik-i-Taliban Pakistan)
- Motive: Attempted infiltration and sabotage

On 27 April 2025, Pakistani Armed Forces reported killing 54 militants attempting to cross into Pakistan from Afghanistan near North Waziristan, a district in Khyber Pakhtunkhwa province. The incident marked one of the deadliest border clashes in recent years.

== Background ==
North Waziristan has long been a hotspot for militant activity, particularly involving the Tehrik-i-Taliban Pakistan (TTP). Following the return of the Taliban to power in Afghanistan in August 2021, Pakistan has experienced a surge in cross-border attacks, with many TTP fighters allegedly finding sanctuary across the border.

== Attack ==
According to the Inter-Services Public Relations (ISPR), Pakistani security forces detected a large group of militants attempting to infiltrate the Pakistan-Afghanistan border. Security forces engaged the infiltrators, resulting in the deaths of 54 militants. The military described the attackers as "Khwarij," a term used for extremists associated with the Pakistani Taliban, and stated that the militants were allegedly planning high-profile attacks within Pakistan.

== Reactions ==
Mohsin Naqvi, Pakistan's Interior Minister, praised the operation as a major success in preempting terrorist attacks. President Asif Ali Zardari and Prime Minister Shehbaz Sharif also commended the security forces for their efforts.

=== Regional tensions ===
The incident occurred amid heightened tensions between Pakistan and India. India had recently accused Pakistan of involvement in a deadly attack on tourists in Indian-administered Kashmir, an allegation Pakistan has denied. The Pakistani military suggested that the infiltration attempt was timed to coincide with such accusations.

== Aftermath ==
On 28 April 2025, a bombing outside a pro-government peace committee office in Wana, South Waziristan, resulted in at least seven deaths and sixteen injuries. No group immediately claimed responsibility, but officials suspected the Tehrik-i-Taliban Pakistan.

== See also ==
- 2025 in Pakistan
- Terrorist incidents in Pakistan in 2025
