= 2025 Mastung bus bombing =

Terrorist attack in Balochistan, Pakistan

- Part of Insurgency in Balochistan and Terrorism in Pakistan
- Location: Mastung, Balochistan, Pakistan
- Date: 15 April, 2025
- Target: Balochistan Constabulary
- Attack type: Bombing
- Deaths: 3
- Injuries: 20
- Perpetrators: Islamic State; Islamic State – Khorasan Province

On 15 April 2025, a bus carrying personnel from the Balochistan Constabulary was targeted with an improvised explosive device, resulting in the deaths of three soldiers and injuries to twenty others.

== Background ==
The Mastung District in Pakistan’s southwestern province of Balochistan has been a center of insurgent and militant activity. The region has experienced violence linked to ethnic Baloch separatist groups as well as Islamic extremist organizations. Balochistan's strategic importance, resource wealth, and complex ethnic composition have contributed to ongoing instability.

Among the groups active in the region is the Islamic State –Khorosan Province (ISKP), a local affiliate of the Islamic State (IS) network. ISKP has claimed responsibility for a number of attacks in Pakistan, often targeting security forces, religious minorities, and civilians.

Pakistani security forces have been conducting counterinsurgency operations in Balochistan for several years in an effort to combat separatist and jihadist threats. Despite efforts, militant attacks remain a persistent challenge in the region.

== Bombing ==
On the morning of 15 April 2025, a bus transporting personnel from the Balochistan Police to Kund Masoori area of Mastung for providing security a sit-in of the Balochistan National Party-Mengal in the Lakpass area was targeted by an improvised explosive device (IED), approximately 40 kilometers from Quetta. According to Balochistan government spokesperson Shahid Rind, the explosion occurred on Dasht Road when a remote-controlled improvised explosive device (IED) planted on a motorcycle detonated near a bus carrying personnel from the Balochistan Constabulary.

The explosion killed three security personnel and injured 20 others. The attack caused significant damage to the vehicle.

In a statement on Tuesday (April 15, 2025), the Islamic State Khorasan (ISKP), which often carries out attacks on security forces in Pakistan and Afghanistan, claimed its “soldiers” targeted the “apostate” police.

== Reactions ==
Pakistani authorities condemned the attack, with Prime Minister Shehbaz Sharif reaffirming the government's commitment to combating terrorism.

== See also ==
- Terrorist incidents in Pakistan in 2025
- List of terrorist incidents in Pakistan
- Insurgency in Balochistan
  - Baloch Liberation Army
  - Operation Azm-e-Istehkam
