= Muhammad Junaid Ghaffar =

Acting Chief Justice of the Sindh High Court

Acting Chief Justice of the Sindh High Court
- Incumbent
- Assumed office 14 February 2025
- Preceded by: Muhammad Shafi Siddiqui

Judge of the Sindh High Court
- Incumbent
- Assumed office 31 August 2013

Personal details
- Born: 14 September 1963 (age 63)
- Education: S. M. Law College

Muhammad Junaid Ghaffar (born 14 September 1963) is a Pakistani judge who has been serving as the Acting Chief Justice of the Sindh High Court (SHC) since 14 February 2025. He has been a judge of the SHC since 31 August 2013.

== Early life and education ==
Ghaffar was born on 14 September 1963. He completed his Secondary School examination at Little Folk's Secondary School in Karachi in 1979. Afterward, he attended Government National College, Karachi, where he earned his Higher School Certificate in Pre-Engineering in 1982. Ghaffar briefly pursued an Electrical Engineering program at NED University of Engineering & Technology, but left the course after a year due to a lack of interest in the subject. He then obtained a Bachelor of Commerce (B.Com) degree from Government Premier College, Karachi, in 1986. In 1990, Ghaffar completed his LL.B. from S. M. Law College in Karachi.

== Legal career ==
Ghaffar's began practicing law in 1993. He was admitted as an Advocate of the Subordinate Courts in Pakistan in 1993, and as an Advocate of the High Courts in 2000. He joined Navin Merchant & Associates, where he was a partner from 2003 until March 2013. During that time, he started practice as an Advocate of the Supreme Court of Pakistan in 2012. In 2013, he established his own legal practice. Ghaffar has been a member of the Supreme Court Bar Association of Pakistan, Sindh High Court Bar Association, Karachi Bar Association, Karachi Tax Bar Association, and the Pakistan Intellectual Property Rights Association. He has also served as the honorary secretary and senior vice president of the Memon Professional Forum.

On 31 August 2013, Ghaffar was appointed as an Additional Judge of the SHC. He was confirmed as a permanent judge of the court on 27 August 2015. As a judge, he has expertise in various legal fields, including taxation, commercial contracts, and intellectual property rights. Ghaffar's elevation to the Acting Chief Justice of the Sindh High Court came on 14 February 2025.
