= Pakistan and Tehrik-i-Taliban Pakistan peace talks =

Peace talks between Pakistan and Tehrik-i- Taliban Pakistan

Pakistan & TTP Ceasefire
- Type: Truce (Peace Deal)
- Location: Khost, Afghanistan
- Effective: 10 May 2022
- Condition: A truce previously agreed for the Muslim festival of Eid now for peace talks
- Expiration: 4 September 2022
- Signatories: Pakistani Government; TTP leadership
- Parties: Pakistan; TTP
- Languages: Pashto, Urdu

Pakistan and Tehrik-i-Taliban Pakistan peace talks was a ceasefire negotiation between the Pakistani government and banned terrorist organization namely Tehrik-i-Taliban Pakistan. Its goal is ending a two-decades long war and hostilities in Pakistan. The talks are held in western Khost province of Afghanistan while the Taliban government played crucial role to bring both parties on the dialogue table. In October 2021 then-Pakistani prime minister Imran Khan expressed his view that "...if TTP surrender and accept Pakistan's law, then they will be free from charges." However, TTP denied the state of prime minister.

On 9 November 2021, the Pakistani government and banned Tehrik-i-Taliban Pakistan signed a one month ceasefire and started peace talks but both failed because the TTP said the government failed to come after the agreement.

Another truce was signed at the beginning of May 2022 for the Muslim festival of Eid and was later extended until 30 May 2022 as the talks continue, talks were held in Kabul, Afghanistan, again the Taliban government played the role of mediator. A delegation led by general Faiz Hameed is holding talks with TTP. The talks were going on for two weeks, reports suggest that Pakistan has released some TTP senior commanders Muhammad Khan and Muslim Khan. However, they were still in the custody of Pakistan and had not been handed over to the Taliban. On the other hand, a 32-member committee that represents Mehsud and another 19-member committee that represents tribes from the Malakand division also have held talks with the Pakistani Government. These meetings took place on 13 and 14 May with the focus on a ceasefire till a conclusion is reached.

On 2 June 2022, Mohammad Khorasani the spokesperson of the TTP announced an indefinite ceasefire with the government of Pakistan.

On 3 June 2022, a 57-member jirga negotiating team of tribal elders from the Khyber Pakhtunkhwa province returned to Pakistan without any major breakthrough over the militants’ demand for the reversal of Fata’s merger with Khyber Pakhtunkhwa, one of the major sticking points in the peace talks. But they agreed for an indefinite ceasefire and that both sides should console with their elders for the next three months.

Omar Khalid Khorasani, a virulent senior leader of the TTP called Jamaat-ul-Ahrar, was killed in a roadside bombing in eastern Afghanistan on 6 August.

On 4 September, the TTP spokesman announced an end to the indefinite ceasefire, claiming that Pakistani government made no efforts to make the negotiations successful, called for nationwide attacks in Pakistan.

A document prepared by the National Counter Terrorism Authority blamed the ‘peace talks’ with the Tehreek-i-Taliban Pakistan (TTP) for an increase in terror attacks across the country.
