= Ratta (YouTuber) =

Sri Lankan YouTuber and actor

Ratta රැට්ටා
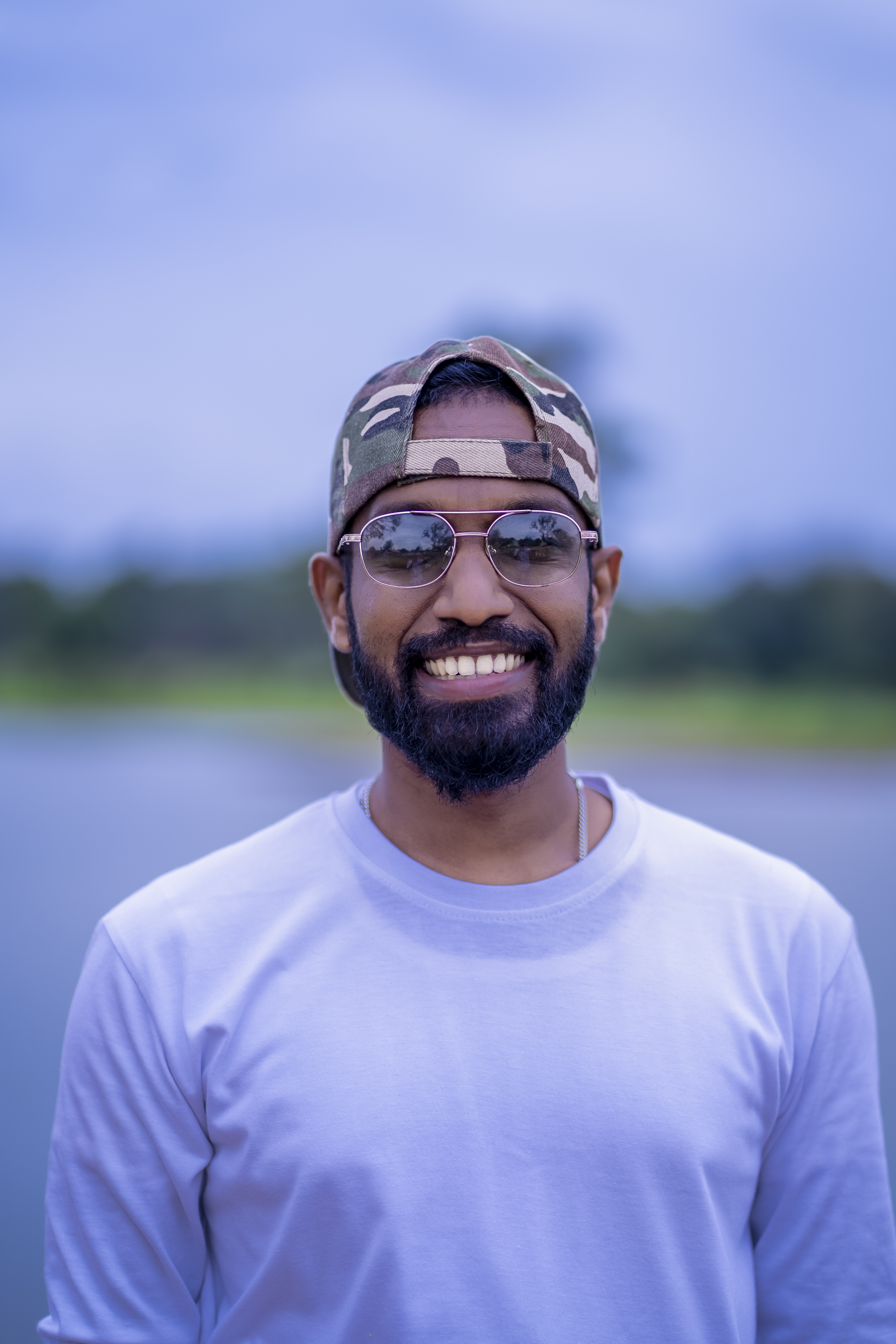
- Ratta in 2020
- Born: Danapala Mudiyanselage Rathidu Suramya Senarathna; 7 December 1987 (age 38); Welisara, Sri Lanka
- Occupations: YouTuber; actor; director; philanthropist; Social media personality

YouTube information
- Channel: ratta
- Years active: 2016–present
- Genres: vlog; comedy; technology; comedy
- Subscribers: 1.67 million
- Views: 299.2 million
- Last updated: October 10, 2026

Danapala Mudiyanselage Rathidu Suramya Senarathna (born 7 December 1987, Sinhala: රතිඳු සේනාරත්න), better known by his stage name Ratta (Sinhala: රැට්ටා), is a Sri Lankan YouTuber, television actor, director, philanthropist and social media personality. Started his career in 2012, Ratta became a popular figure in YouTube and other social media. During the preceding years, Ratta became one of the leading YouTube channels and a brand in Sri Lanka. The production of comic stories also takes place through Ratta where all the characters in the videos produced and played by Rathidu himself as well as videography and editing.

== Personal life ==
He was born on 7 December 1987 in Mahabage, Welisara, Sri Lanka as the second child in a family with one elder brother Isuru, and one younger sister, Sureka. His father Danapala Mudiyanselage Senarathna and mother Anne Botheju are both retired teachers. Rathidu completed education from De Mazenod College Kandana and studied A/L from commerce stream. After that, he moved to Ja-Ela with his family in 2007. In 2008, he went to Italy for a brief period and then returned to the country in late 2009 with the intention of getting established in Sri Lanka.

== Career ==
At the age of 22, started to work as a banking assistant in a private bank. However, he left the job within less than six months. In 2016, he got qualified as a management accountant and at this point, became a member of the Chartered Institute of Management Accountants UK. He joined a BPO company as an account associate in March 2012. In the meantime, he had an interest in became an actor as well. During his job, his colleagues used to call him "Ratta", which he later used as his stage name in YouTube and Facebook.

In March 2016, his maiden video titled Adhbhootha Putuwa (The Mysterious Chair), which he shot with a new camera as a test and later uploaded to Facebook. The video gained around 10 000 views on Facebook. This influenced Rathidu to start a YouTube channel in 2017 with the same title "Ratta". By the middle of 2018, it was still on Facebook that his videos went viral but not on YouTube. Also, in 2018, Rathidu decided to quit his cooperate life (resigning from his post as assistant manager- Finance at Allianz) and become a full-time content creator. Later he made several videos that marked turning points in Sri Lankan YouTube industry. Through the videos, he also managed to pass a message to Sri Lankan youth regarding the usage of social media usefully and its negative consequences. In November 2018, he made a parody video for the popular ‘Vogue Jewelers’ advertisement theme song "Mangala Mudu Maala Walalu" sung by Indian singer Sonu Nigam. The video went viral in Sri Lanka. After this juncture, each video he posted started becoming trending that the count of subscribers which was 35 000 in November 2018 accelerated to 100 000 by 1 January 2019.

In October 2019, his channel got banned from YouTube and the Google services for uploading a fan reaction video which got reported for breaching community guidelines under the ‘child abuse and exploitation’ category. Ratta created a new channel after this incident. Within five hours, his fans earned his new YouTube channel 70,000 subscribers. This incident became a hot-button issue in the Sri Lankan social media backdrop. However, After reviewing his appeal the old channel was given back to him. After that incidence, he founded the social service initiative Mehewara. As the first program, Mehewara crew organized a blood donation campaign on 20 November 2019 at Central Blood Bank Narahenpita with more than 350 donations in one day. The campaign became the biggest blood donation campaign organized in a blood center in Sri Lanka.

Apart from social service, Ratta received critical acclaim and nominations at Raigam Social Media Awards (SoMe) Awards 2019 for several categories: Most popular YouTube channel, Most popular Facebook page, Most popular video, Most popular Short film, Social media influencer of the year, and The social media personality of the year. And won two awards for the Most Popular YouTube channel and for the Most Popular Short film for his video Asadarane. Meanwhile, As his third YouTube channel, Ratta launched "RatTec" which is a tech unboxing channel.

In 2019, he made his debut television acting with the television serial No Parking. In the serial, he played a supportive role 'Kichi Dammika' along with the popular actor Jagath Chamila. In the same year, he joined with the television program Chamber of Magicians telecast in ITN. In early 2020, he started a program to plant one million Arjuna trees and Indian mahua trees across the country with the help and guidance of popular Biology tuition master Tissa Jananayake. He also made several collaborative works with many popular artists Kuppa Cinema, Fortune Films, Lochi, Sulakkhana and Sippi Cinema.

In 2019, Rathidu launched his own studio, "Studio Ratta (pvt) Ltd." in Ja-Ela. By the end of February 2021, Ratta surpassed 1,000,000 subscribers on his YouTube channel.

In 2025, he acted in the film Eka Thamai Meka directed by Suranga de Alwis.

== Social Activism and arrest ==
Ratta became a key figure during the Galle Face protests against the Gotabhaya Rajapaksa government. In June 2022, he was arrested by the Colombo Crimes Division after recording a statement. The arrest was due to having a disruptive protest near the Fort Magistrate's Court and interfering the judicial proceedings and the duties of officials as well as damaging to public property. The suspects were ordered to be remanded until 1 July 2022.

On 1 August 202, Colombo Fort Magistrate ordered a foreign travel ban on three social activists, including Ratta.

== See also ==
- List of YouTube personalities
