= Chakri, Rawalpindi =

چکری
- Village
- Chakri
- Location within Pakistan
- Coordinates: 33.2935°N 72.7621°E
- Country: Pakistan
- Province: Punjab (Pakistan)
- District: Rawalpindi
- Elevation: 310 m (1,020 ft)
- Time zone: UTC+5 (PST)

Chakri (Urdu :چکری) village is located 43 km south of Rawalpindi city. The tehsil of this village and the district of Rawalpindi is the city. It is located along the Islamabad to Lahore motorway.

== Health facilities ==
The village has a Government Hospital for basic health facilities. In the event of a severe illness, people go to major hospitals in Rawalpindi for treatment.
