= Cadet College Wana attack =

2025 terrorist attack in Wana, Pakistan

2025 Cadet College Wana attack
- Part of the insurgency in Khyber Pakhtunkhwa
Date	10–11 November 2025
Location	Wana, South Waziristan District, Khyber Pakhtunkhwa, Pakistan
Result	Pakistani victory: Militants fail to harm any cadets or personnel in the college

Belligerents
Pakistan Armed Forces; Pakistan Army	Pakistani Taliban (alleged)

Casualties and losses
None	6 killed
- 9 civilians injured 650 personnel evacuated

On 10 November 2025, Cadet College Wana in Wana, South Waziristan, Khyber Pakhtunkhwa, Pakistan, was attacked by terrorists. The attackers were described by the Pakistani military as "Khawarij affiliated with Fitna-ul-Khawarij", using the Pakistani government's name for the Pakistani Taliban. The attack was aimed at targeting the educational institution and its students and staff. Pakistani security forces killed several attackers, and all students and staff were safely evacuated.

== Background ==
Cadet College Wana is a military-style residential cadet college located in Wana, South Waziristan District, Khyber Pakhtunkhwa province, Pakistan.

== Attack ==
On 10 November 2025, an explosives-laden vehicle rammed into the main gate of Cadet College Wana, causing the gate to collapse and damaging adjacent structures. Initially, the attackers attempted to breach the perimeter, but Pakistani troops responded quickly and repelled them. After the blast at the gate, several terrorists entered the college premises, including the administrative block. They were declared surrounded by the army there. A clearance operation was launched, with Pakistani security forces started extracted the cadets and staff, engaging the infiltrators. By the next day, all students and teachers had reportedly been evacuated.

== Casualties and damage ==
At least two terrorists were killed during the initial operation. Some reports suggest that five terrorists, including a suicide bomber, were killed during the operation. At least six civilians were reported injured in the blast at the gate. According to official sources, no students or teachers were killed, and all were evacuated safely.

== Reaction ==
The official statement of the Pakistan Army (via Inter-Services Public Relations, ISPR) said the attack was orchestrated by "Indian proxy" militants operating from Afghanistan. The ISPR stressed the rapid response of the troops and drew parallels to the 2014 APS Peshawar attack.

== Aftermath ==
All students and staff of Cadet College Wana were safely evacuated. The number of people inside at the time of the attack was estimated at 650, including around 525 cadets.

A clearance operation to eliminate the remaining militants and clear the premises of explosive devices continued until 11 November.

The Pakistani leadership including Prime Minister Shehbaz Sharif and Interior Minister Mohsin Naqvi condemned the attack and praised the security forces and reiterated the country's commitment to eliminate terrorism.

== See also ==
- 2025 Islamabad suicide bombing
