= 2025 Waziristan drone strike =

2025 drone strike in Hurmuz, Pakistan

- Part of Insurgency in Khyber Pakhtunkhwa and Operation Azm-e-Istehkam
- Location: Hurmuz, Khyber Pakhtunkhwa, Pakistan
- Date: May 19, 2025; Daytime (PKT)
- Target: Pakistani Taliban or Pakistan Army
- Attack type: Drone strike
- Weapon: Quadcopter drone with munitions
- Deaths: 4
- Injuries: 5
- Victim: Local Civilians
- Perpetrators: Pakistan Army or Pakistani Taliban

The 2025 Waziristan drone strike was an attack that occurred on May 19, 2025, in Hurmuz village, Mir Ali tehsil, North Waziristan, Pakistan, killing four children from the same family and injuring five others, including a woman. The attack sparked major protests and conflicting claims about responsibility, with the Pakistani military denying involvement and blaming the TTP, while local communities remained uncertain about the perpetrator.

== Background ==
The strike occurred during ongoing military operations in North Waziristan as part of Pakistan's Operation Azm-e-Istehkam against militant groups. The region has experienced significant conflict, including over 400 U.S. drone strikes between 2004 and 2018.

The incident took place amid heightened tensions following a major military escalation between India and Pakistan from May 7–10, 2025. Both Pakistani security forces and the TTP are known to operate quadcopter drones in the region.

== The attack ==
On May 19, 2025, during daytime hours, a quadcopter drone dropped munitions on a civilian house in Hurmuz village, Mir Ali tehsil. The attack killed four children from the same family and injured five others, including a woman. Some of the injured were in critical condition and were taken to Mir Ali Hospital for treatment.

== Responsibility ==
Local communities initially could not identify who conducted the strike, as both Pakistani security forces and the TTP operate quadcopters in the area. No group immediately claimed responsibility for the attack.

On May 22, 2025, Pakistan's ISPR issued an official statement categorically denying security forces' involvement in the attack. The military statement blamed "Indian-sponsored Fitna Al Khwarij" (the Pakistani military's term for the TTP), claiming the militants were "acting at the behest of their Indian masters." The ISPR called allegations against security forces "entirely baseless" and part of a "coordinated disinformation campaign."

== Protests ==
Thousands of people staged sit-in protests at Mir Ali Chowk following the attack. Protesters placed the children's bodies on the main road as a demonstration and refused to bury them until receiving answers about responsibility for the attack. A council of tribal elders (jirga) became involved in negotiations with authorities. Tribal elder Mufti Baitullah stated: "We are not blaming anyone, but we want justice, and the government should tell us who killed our children."

Protesters demanded that authorities verify that the victims were civilians and not militants. They called for a transparent, independent investigation into the incident and accountability for those responsible.

== Investigation ==
The affected community and tribal leaders demanded the formation of an independent, impartial commission to investigate the incident. The community's refusal to accept the military's version of events without independent verification highlighted the trust deficit between local populations and security forces.

== Aftermath ==
North Waziristan District Police Officer Waqar Ahmad confirmed that negotiations were ongoing with tribal elders, while Mir Ali Tehsildar Sher Bahadar led talks with tribal councils. The federal government issued no official statement on the matter.

Khyber Pakhtunkhwa Relief Minister Haji Nek Muhammad Khan strongly condemned the attack on social media, stating: "I have already clearly said on the floor of the KP Assembly that all types of operations and war operations should be kept away from civilian populations." He promised to "raise our voice at every forum and make every effort to bring those responsible to justice."

As of May 22, 2025, sit-in protests continued in Mir Ali, with negotiations ongoing between local officials and tribal elders. The local population experienced increased fear and anxiety following the attack. Military operations against militants continued in the region despite the incident.

The incident highlighted ongoing tensions between local communities and security forces, raising questions about transparency in military operations and accountability for civilian casualties. It occurred as part of a broader pattern of civilian casualties in counterterrorism operations in the region.

== Reactions ==
Maulana Fazlur Rehman, leader of Jamiat Ulema-e-Islam (F), addressed the incident in the National Assembly of Pakistan, stating: "If today still drones fall in Waziristan... how will we respond to the people?"

Pakistan Tehreek-e-Insaf members criticized the government's response, questioning what the reaction would be if such strikes occurred in Punjab cities. Defense Minister Khawaja Asif left without responding when journalists attempted to question him about the incident.

The Human Rights Commission of Pakistan expressed deep concern about "the reportedly continued use of drones in civilian areas," calling it "a grave violation of human rights, including the fundamental right to life." The organization supported "the local community's demand for an independent investigation into the incident."

== See also ==
- Drone strikes in Pakistan
- Operation Azm-e-Istehkam
- Tehrik-i-Taliban Pakistan
- 2025 India–Pakistan conflict
- Insurgency in Khyber Pakhtunkhwa
- 2025 Khuzdar school bus bombing
