= Ratta Kulachi =

Coordinates: 31°52′N 70°54′E

- Town and union council
- Interactive map of Ratta Kulachi
- Country: Pakistan
- Region: Khyber Pakhtunkhwa
- District: Dera Ismail Khan District
- Time zone: UTC+5 (PST)

Ratta Kulachi is a town and union council of Dera Ismail Khan District in Khyber Pakhtunkhwa province of Pakistan.
