= 2025 Khuzdar school bus bombing =

Suicide bombing in Balochistan, Pakistan

- Part of Insurgency in Balochistan and Terrorism in Pakistan
- Location of Khuzdar district (red)
- Location: Khuzdar, Balochistan, Pakistan
- Date: 21 May 2025
- Attack type: Suicide bombing, improvised explosive device attack, vehicle-ramming attack
- Deaths: 12 (Including the perpetrator)
- Injuries: 53
- Perpetrator: Balochistan Liberation Army (Suspected)
- No. of participants: 1

On 21 May 2025 a suicide bombing occurred on a school bus in Khuzdar, located in the Pakistani province of Balochistan. A suicide bomber drove an explosive-laden vehicle into a school bus transporting students of the Army Public School. The attack took place around 7:40 a.m. local time (2:40 GMT) and resulted in the deaths of at least 10 people: eight children, the bus driver and a bus conductor. A total of 53 people, including 39 children, were injured in the explosion. The suicide bomber himself died by detonating itself.

== Bombing ==
On 21 May 2025, a suicide bomber rammed an explosive-laden vehicle into a school bus in Khuzdar city, located in the southwestern Pakistani province of Balochistan, at a place known as Zero Point, 8 kilometers from the city center in the Khuzdar district. The bus was transporting 46 students of the Army Public School in Khuzdar. Three children were killed instantly, and several others sustained injuries. Subsequently, five more students succumbed to their injuries, raising the death toll to 10.

The Bomb Disposal Squad later confirmed that the attacker's vehicle contained over 30 kilograms of explosives.

== Responsibility ==
No group immediately claimed responsibility for the bombing. Pakistani authorities accused Indian intelligence agencies of orchestrating the attack through proxy militant groups, amid heightened bilateral tensions due to the fallout of the last month's Pahalgam attack and the subsequent 2025 India–Pakistan conflict. Deutsche Welle said "[o]bservers say there could be several motives for the attack, but it cannot be ruled out that the attack could have been prevented if there were no flaws in the security plan and effective arrangements were made."

Pakistani officials indicated that the bombing bore the hallmarks of previous Balochistan Liberation Army (BLA) attacks and confirmed that the attack was premeditated, aimed at demoralizing Pakistani forces by targeting their families. A preliminary investigation report into the attack was submitted to the government while a case of assault was registered at a Counter Terrorism Department (CTD) police station by local authorities.

India rejected having any involvement in the attack. In a statement posted on X, Ministry of External Affairs spokesperson Randhir Jaiswal said "India rejects the baseless allegations made by Pakistan regarding Indian involvement with the incident in Khuzdar."

Abdullah Khan, a senior security analyst based in Islamabad and Managing Director of the Pakistan Institute for Conflict and Security Studies (PICSS) in an interview with Deutsche Welle, said the Balochistan insurgency is complex and "[w]e should not blame anyone without investigation like the Indian Pahalgam claim", as no group has claimed responsibility so far, unlike previous attacks such as the Jaffar Express hijacking. Khan said the motive of the attack "could be that anti-peace elements are trying to weaken the state writ". Mir Khuda Bakhsh Marri, a political analyst on Balochistan affairs and former Sindh minister said the provincial government was "blaming outsiders to hide their incompetence". Marri said there is "need to formulate a strategy to improve this situation through a comprehensive investigation", and that the provincial government was "defaming the state due to its incompetence and this apathy and negligence is being taken advantage of by those who do not want peace here".

Following statements by the DG ISPR Ahmed Sharif Chaudhry attributing Khuzdar attack to external actors, Pakistani government officials declared their intention to take decisive action and ensure accountability for the perpetrators. General Chaudhry also claimed that "Indian social media accounts affiliated with the Indian intelligence agency RAW posted about the attack beforehand."

== Investigation ==
Following the incident, Pakistan's Counter Terrorism Department (CTD) registered a formal case and initiated an investigation in coordination with intelligence agencies. Preliminary analysis confirmed the use of over 30 kilograms of explosives in a vehicle-borne improvised explosive device (VBIED). Forensic teams collected evidence from the blast site, including vehicle remnants and explosive residues. Pakistani officials later said that the Baloch Liberation Army (BLA) was behind the attack, saying that Indian intelligence had provided them with the support necessary to carry it out, which India denied. As of 25 May 2025, no group had claimed responsibility, and the investigation had remained ongoing.

== Reactions ==
- Afghanistan: The spokesperson of the Islamic Emirate of Afghanistan, Zabihullah Mujahid strongly condemned the attack and also rejected any Pakistani attribution to Afghan involvement in the attack.
- Canada: The Canadian High Commission condemned the attack, expressed deep sorrow over the loss of lives, including children, and extended condolences to the victims' families.
- China: Chinese Ambassador Jiang Zaidong condemned the attack and expressed support for advancing counter-terrorism operations by Pakistan.
- Germany: German Ambassador to Pakistan, Alfred Grannas condemned the attack. Tweeting that "We are shocked by this murder of innocent civilians, including children."
- India: The Ministry of External Affairs condemned the attack and expressed condolences. India also rejected Pakistani claims of Indian involvement in the attack as "baseless allegations" and further stated that any "attempt to hoodwink the world is doomed to fail".
- Iran: The Iranian Ambassador to Pakistan, Reza Amiri Moghadam condemned the attack and expressed condolences.
- Poland: Polish Ambassador Maciej Pisarski strongly condemned the attack, calling it incomprehensible and inexcusable.
- Russia: A spokesperson for the Russian Embassy in Pakistan strongly condemned the "cowardly" attack and expressed deepest condolences to the bereaved families.
- Turkey: In an official statement, the Turkish Ministry of Foreign Affairs expressed deep sorrow over the loss of lives and injuries, noting that they were "deeply saddened by the loss of lives, including children, and many injuries caused by the terrorist attack".
- United Kingdom: British High Commissioner to Pakistan, Jane Marriott strongly condemned the "horrendous attack". She expressed deep sorrow over the loss of children's lives and the targeting of minors in the attack.
- United States: U.S. Chargé d'Affaires, Natalie A. Baker strongly condemned the bombing, describing it as a "brutal and unconscionable attack", and stated that "the murder of innocent children is beyond comprehension". She expressed deep sympathy with the victims, adding that "we grieve with the families who lost loved ones, and our thoughts are with those recovering".
- UNICEF: UNICEF South Asia strongly condemned the attack on children and stated that children should never be a victim of violence as well as expressed concern on the security of children in Pakistan.
- United Nations: The United Nations Security Council strongly condemned the attack, calling it a cowardly and reprehensible act. It expressed sympathy with the families of the victims, wished a speedy recovery to the injured, and emphasized that those responsible must be brought to justice.

== See also ==
- List of terrorist incidents in 2025
- Terrorist incidents in Pakistan in 2025
- 2024 Balochistan bombings
- August 2024 Balochistan attacks
- Insurgency in Balochistan
- Sistan and Baluchestan insurgency
- Terrorism in Pakistan
