= Religious syncretism =

Blending of two or more religious belief systems into a new system

Religious syncretism is the blending of religious belief systems into a new system, or the incorporation of other beliefs into an existing religious tradition.

This can occur for many reasons, where religious traditions exist in proximity to each other, or when a culture is conquered and the conquerors bring their religious beliefs with them, but do not succeed in eradicating older beliefs and practices. It frequently involves melding church and state power. Many religions have syncretic elements, but adherents often frown upon the application of the label, especially those who belong to "revealed" religions, such as Abrahamic religions, or any system with an exclusivist approach, seeing syncretism as corrupting the original religion. Non-exclusivist systems of belief on the other hand feel more free to incorporate other traditions into their own.

== Ancient history ==
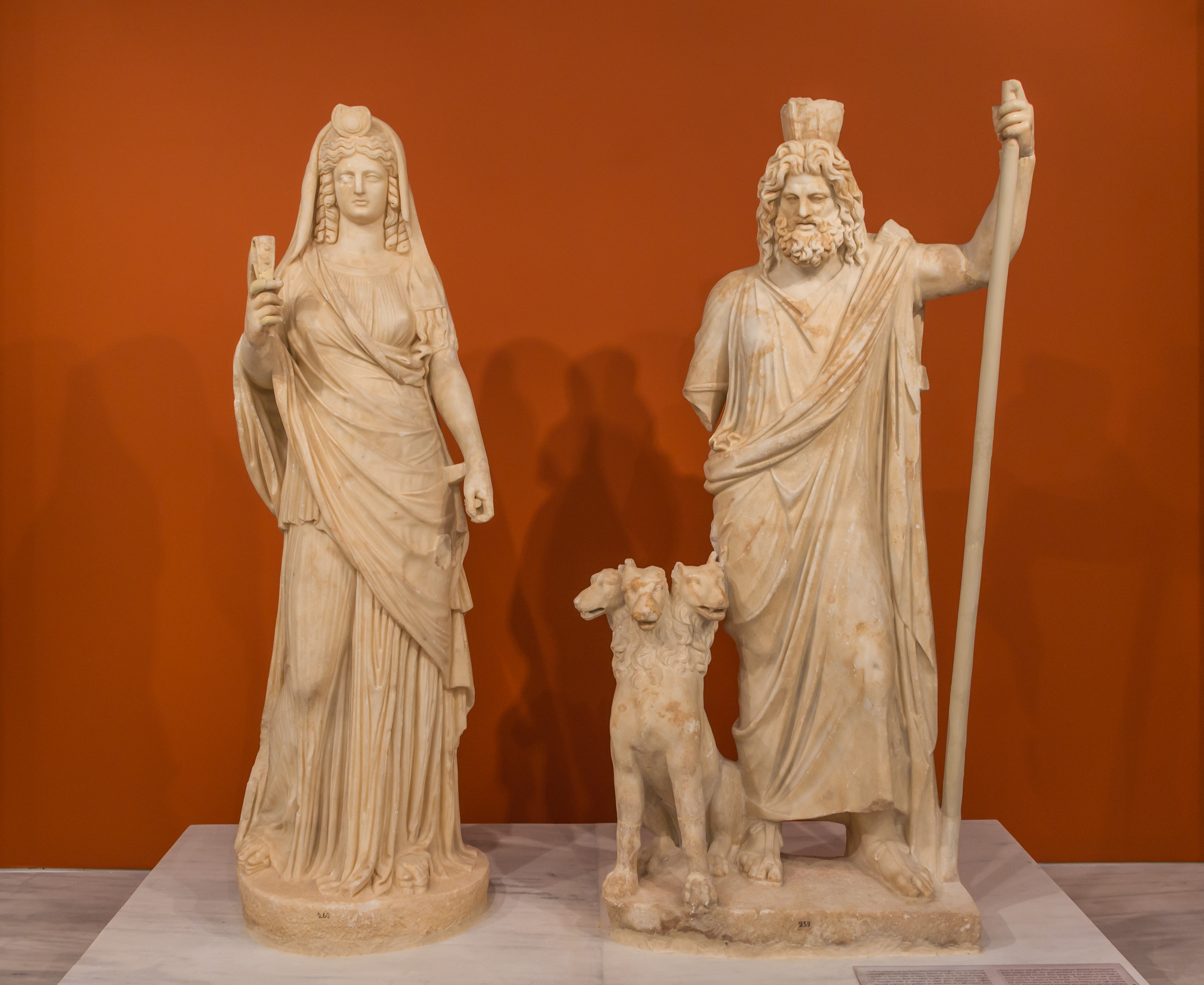
The gods Persephone-Isis and Hades-Serapis, an example of Greco-Egyptian religious syncretism

Classical Athens was exclusive in matters of religion. Some sources assert that the Decree of Diopeithes made the introduction of and belief in foreign gods a criminal offense and allowed only Greeks to worship in Athenian temples and festivals (as foreigners were considered impure). Other sources dispute the existence of the decree.

Syncretism was a feature of Hellenistic Ancient Greek religion, though only outside Greece. Overall, Hellenistic culture in the age that followed Alexander the Great itself showed syncretist features, essentially blending Mesopotamian, Persian, Anatolian, Egyptian, and (eventually) Etruscan–Roman elements within a Hellenic formula. The Egyptian god Amun was developed into the Hellenized Zeus Ammon after Alexander the Great went into the desert to seek out his oracle at the Siwa Oasis.

The Romans, identifying themselves as joint heirs to a very similar civilization, identified Greek gods with similar figures in the Etruscan-Roman tradition, though usually without copying cult practices. (For details, see interpretatio graeca.) Syncretic gods of the Hellenistic period also found wide favor in Rome. For example, Serapis, Isis, and Mithras. Cybele, as worshipped in Rome, essentially represented a syncretic East Mediterranean goddess. The Romans imported the Greek god Dionysus into Rome, where he merged with the Latin mead god Liber, and converted the Anatolian Sabazios into the Roman Sabazius.

The degree of likeness varied: Jupiter was perhaps a better match with Zeus than the rural huntress Diana was for the feared Artemis. Ares was not homologous to Mars. The Romans physically imported the (statue of) Anatolian goddess Cybele into Rome from her cult center in Anatolian Pessinos in the form of her original aniconic archaic stone idol; they identified her as Magna Mater and gave her a matronly, explicitly iconic image developed in Hellenistic Pergamum.

Likewise, when the Romans encountered Celts and Germanic peoples, they mingled those peoples' gods with their own, creating Sulis Minerva, Apollo Sucellos ('Apollo the Good Smiter') and Mars Thingsus ('Mars of the war-assembly'), among many others. In Germania, the Roman historian Tacitus speaks of Germanic worshippers of Hercules and Mercury; most modern scholars tentatively identify Hercules as Thor and Mercury as Odin.

Roman religion had had syncretic elements from very early on, for example in incorporating the Greek god Apollo and semi-divine Hercules. The Romans did not consider adopted religious elements to be less meaningful or otherwise inferior to earlier Roman religion, and such early acceptance made it easier for them to integrate the religions they encountered as they expanded their empire.

=== Early Christianity ===
Gnosticism is identified as an early form of syncretism that challenged the beliefs of early Christians. Gnostic dualism posited that only spiritual or invisible things were good, and that material or visible things were evil. Mainstream Christians have generally held that matter is essentially good because they believe that God created all things, both spiritual and material, and described creation as "very good". Simon Magus has been identified as one of the early proponents of Gnosticism.

In the first few centuries after the crucifixion of Jesus, there were various competing "Jesus movements". The Roman emperors used syncretism to help unite the expanding empire. Social conversion to Christianity happened all over Europe. Conversion became even more effective when missionaries accommodated established cultural traditions and incorporated them into a Christian framework. Sometimes old pagan gods—or at least their aspects and roles—were transferred to Christian saints, such as when Demetrius of Thessaloniki inherited the role of patron of agriculture from Demeter and the Eleusinian Mysteries after the latter's demise in the 4th century.

Syncretism is distinguished from cultural assimilation, the latter of which refers to the church's ability to "incorporate into herself all that is true, good, and beautiful in the world". This idea was present in the early Christian Church; the Second Apology of Justin Martyr states: "Whatever things were rightly said among all men, are the property of us Christians". The Church has assimilated many (though not all) of the ideas of Plato and Aristotle. Augustine of Hippo is remembered for assimilating the ideas of Plato, while Thomas Aquinas is known for doing so with the ideas of Aristotle. In his essay on the development of Christian doctrine, John Henry Newman clarified the idea of assimilation.

=== Early Judaism ===
In Moses and Monotheism, Sigmund Freud argued that Judaism arose out of the monotheism briefly imposed on Egypt during the rule of Akhenaten. Some writers have cited the Code of Hammurabi as a likely starting point for the Jewish Ten Commandments. Some scholars hold that Judaism refined its concept of monotheism and adopted features such as its eschatology, angelology, and demonology through contacts with Zoroastrianism. However, some scholars dispute that claim.

Despite the halakhic prohibitions against polytheism, idolatry, and associated practices (Avodah Zarah), several combinations of Judaism with other religions have sprung up: Messianic Judaism, Jewish Buddhism, Nazarenism, and Semitic neopaganism. Several Jewish Messiah claimants (such as Jacob Frank) and the Sabbateans came to mix Kabbalistic Judaism with Christianity and Islam.

== Post-classical history ==
=== Zoroastrianism and Islam ===
The Danish orientalist Arthur Christensen, in his book Iran During The Sassanid Era, mentioned that the sources dating back to the era of the Sasanian Empire in Old Persian that refer to Zoroastrian doctrine do not match the sources that appeared after the collapse of the state, such as the Pahlavi source and others. Christensen argued that, because of the fall of the Sasanian state, Zoroastrian clerics sought to save their religion from extinction by adapting it to resemble Islam in order to retain followers.

Gherardo Gnoli comments that the Islamic conquest of Persia caused a huge impact on the Zoroastrian doctrine:

"After the Islamic conquest of Persia and the migration of many Zoroastrians to India and after being exposed to Islamic and Christian propaganda, the Zoroastrians, especially the Parsis in India, went so far as to deny dualism and consider themselves completely monotheists. After several transformations and developments, one of the distinctive features of the Zoroastrian religion gradually faded away and almost disappeared from modern Zoroastrianism."

Maneckji Nusserwanji Dhalla described the doctrine of the Gayomarthians as another attempt to mitigate the dualism that has always been the essence of Zoroastrianism. This was due to the Prophet Muhammad's emphasis on monotheism and the Muslims' mockery of the doctrine of worshipping two gods, which made the Zoroastrians view dualism as a defect, so they added monotheism, which led to the Zoroastrians' division into sects and he mentions examples of the Zoroastrian attempt to establish a monotheistic belief by diminishing the importance of Ahriman, including that Ahura Mazda and Ahriman were created from time, or that Ahura Mazda himself allowed the existence of evil, or that Ahriman was a corrupt angel who rebelled against Ahura Mazda. Then he mentions the name of a Persian book from the 15th century in which it is written that the Magi (Zoroastrians) believe that Allah and Iblis are brothers.

The Zoroastrians also combined the characters in Zoroastrianism with Islam, as Zoroaster was considered Abraham, and Jamshid is used as another name for Solomon.

=== Islam and West Asian religions ===
The Islamic mystical tradition known as Sufism appears somewhat syncretic in its origins, but many other modern scholars reject this view.

Mainstream Sufism does not present itself as a separate set of beliefs from the mainstream Sunni tradition; well-established orders like those of the Naqshbandi, Qadiri, and Shadhili have always been part and parcel of normative Islamic life. During the Sufi presence in Bengal, Muslim–Tantric syncretism was a general trend, and Nobibongšo by Syed Sultan is an example of it. The book tells the lineage of the prophets of Islam. Apart from Adam, Noah, Abraham, Moses, and Jesus, the poet also describes Dharmic figures such as Brahma, Vishnu, Rama, and Krishna.

The Barghawata kingdom of Morocco followed a syncretic religion inspired by Islam (perhaps influenced by Judaism) with elements of Sunni, Shi'ite and Kharijite Islam, mixed with astrological and heathen traditions. Supposedly, they had their own Qur'an in the Berber language, comprising 80 surahs, under the leadership of the second ruler of the dynasty, Salih ibn Tarif, who had taken part in the Maysara uprising. He proclaimed himself a prophet. He also claimed to be the final Mahdi of Islamic tradition, and that Isa (Jesus) would be his companion and pray behind him.

The Druze, during the development of their religion, integrated elements of Ismailism with Gnosticism and Platonism. The Druze faith also incorporates some elements of Christianity. Due to the Christian influence on Druze faith, two Christian saints became the Druze's favorite venerated figures: Saint George and Elijah. According to scholar Ray Jabre Mouawad the Druze appreciated the two saints for their bravery: Saint George because he confronted the dragon and Elijah because he competed with the pagan priests of Baal and won over them. In both cases, the explanations provided by Christians are that Druze were attracted to warrior saints that resemble their own militarized society.

Satpanth is considered a syncretism of Ismaili Islam and Hinduism.

=== South and East Asian religions ===
Buddhism has syncretized with many traditional beliefs in East Asian societies, as it is compatible with local religions. Notable syncretizations of Buddhism with local beliefs include the Three Teachings, or Triple Religions (a concept that harmonizes Mahayana Buddhism with Confucian philosophy and elements of Taoism) and Shinbutsu-shūgō (a syncretism of Shinto and Buddhism). The religious beliefs, practices, and identities of East Asians (who comprise the majority of the world's Buddhists) often blend Buddhism with other traditions including Confucianism, Chinese folk religion, Taoism, Shinto, Korean shamanism, and Vietnamese folk religion. Before and during World War II, a Nichiren Shōshū priest named Jimon Ogasawara proposed the blending of Nichiren Buddhism with Shinto.

Hinduism, Buddhism, Jainism, and Zoroastrianism in ancient India have made many adaptations over the millennia, assimilating elements of various religious traditions. One example of this is the Yoga Vasistha text which had developed by the 14th century CE.

Peter Flügel regards the Akram Vignan Movement established by Dada Bhagwan in the 1960s as a Jain-Vaishnavi Hindu syncretistic movement.

The Mughal emperor Akbar (r. 1556–1605), who wanted to consolidate the diverse religious communities in his empire, propounded in 1582 Din-i-Ilahi. This short-lived syncretic religion aimed to merge the best elements of the Mughal empire's religions. The Allopanishad text dates from the period of Akbar's experimental religious policy.

Satpanth (founded in the 14th century CE) synthesizes elements of Ismaili Islam and Hinduism.

Meivazhi, a syncretic monotheistic minority religion, originated in the 19th century CE in the area of present-day Tamil Nadu, India. Its teachings focus on spiritual enlightenment and the conquering of death. Mevaizhi preaches a "Oneness-of-Essence" message of all the previous major scriptures—particularly Islam, Judaism, Christianity, Hinduism, and Buddhism —allowing membership regardless of creed. Meivazhi's disciples include thousands of people from 69 different castes and religions.

In China, most of the population follows syncretistic religions combining Mahayana Buddhism, Taoism, and elements of Confucianism. Among Chinese believers, approximately 85% adhere to Chinese traditional religion, and many profess to be both Mahayana Buddhist and Taoist. Many of the pagodas in China are dedicated to both Buddhist and Taoist deities.

Likewise, in Southeast Asia, the local variants of Buddhism have adapted to accommodate folk beliefs, such as the veneration of nats in Myanmar and phi in Thailand. Tibetan Buddhism is also syncretic, incorporating practices from the earlier Bön religion. The various Indianised cultures of Southeast Asia also incorporated Hinduism with local beliefs and folklore, such as the veneration of Dewi Sri in Java.

At least hundreds of thousands of people follow religions that syncretize Chinese folk religion and Christianity, while others follow similar belief-structures that incorporate Islamic theology instead and have precedents in some 19th- and 20th-century Muslim populations in China.

The traditional Mun faith of the Lepcha people of the Himalayas predates their seventh-century conversion to Lamaism. Since that time, the Lepcha have practised it together with Buddhism. Since the arrival of Christian missionaries in the nineteenth century, Mun traditions have been followed alongside that faith. The traditional religion permits the incorporation of Buddha and Jesus as deities, depending on household beliefs.

== Modern history ==
=== Christianity ===
One can contrast Christian syncretism with contextualization or inculturation, the practice of making Christianity relevant to a culture: Contextualisation does not address the doctrine but affects a change in the styles or expression of worship. Although Christians often took their European music and building styles into churches in other parts of the world, in a contextualization approach, they would build churches, sing songs, and pray in a local ethnic style. Some Jesuit missionaries adapted local systems and images to teach Christianity, as did the Portuguese in China, the practice of which was opposed by the Dominicans, leading to the Chinese rites controversy.

==== Protestant Reformation ====
Syncretism did not play a role when Christianity split into eastern and western rites during the Great Schism. It became involved, however, with the rifts of the Protestant Reformation, with Desiderius Erasmus's readings of Plutarch. Even earlier, syncretism was a fundamental aspect of the efforts of Neoplatonists such as Marsilio Ficino to reform the teachings of the Roman Catholic Church. In 1615, David Pareus of Heidelberg urged Christians to a "pious syncretism" in opposing the Antichrist, but few 17th-century Protestants discussed the compromises that might effect a reconciliation with the Catholic Church: Johann Hülsemann, Johann Georg Dorsche, and Abraham Calovius (1612–85) opposed the Lutheran Georg Calisen "Calixtus" (1586–1656) of the University of Helmstedt for his "syncretism". (See: Syncretistic controversy.)

==== Modern usage ====
Pope Paul VI included a warning against syncretism in his encyclical letter of 1964, Ecclesiam Suam:

Irenism and syncretism [are] ultimately nothing more than skepticism about the power and content of the Word of God which we desire to preach.

==== New World ====
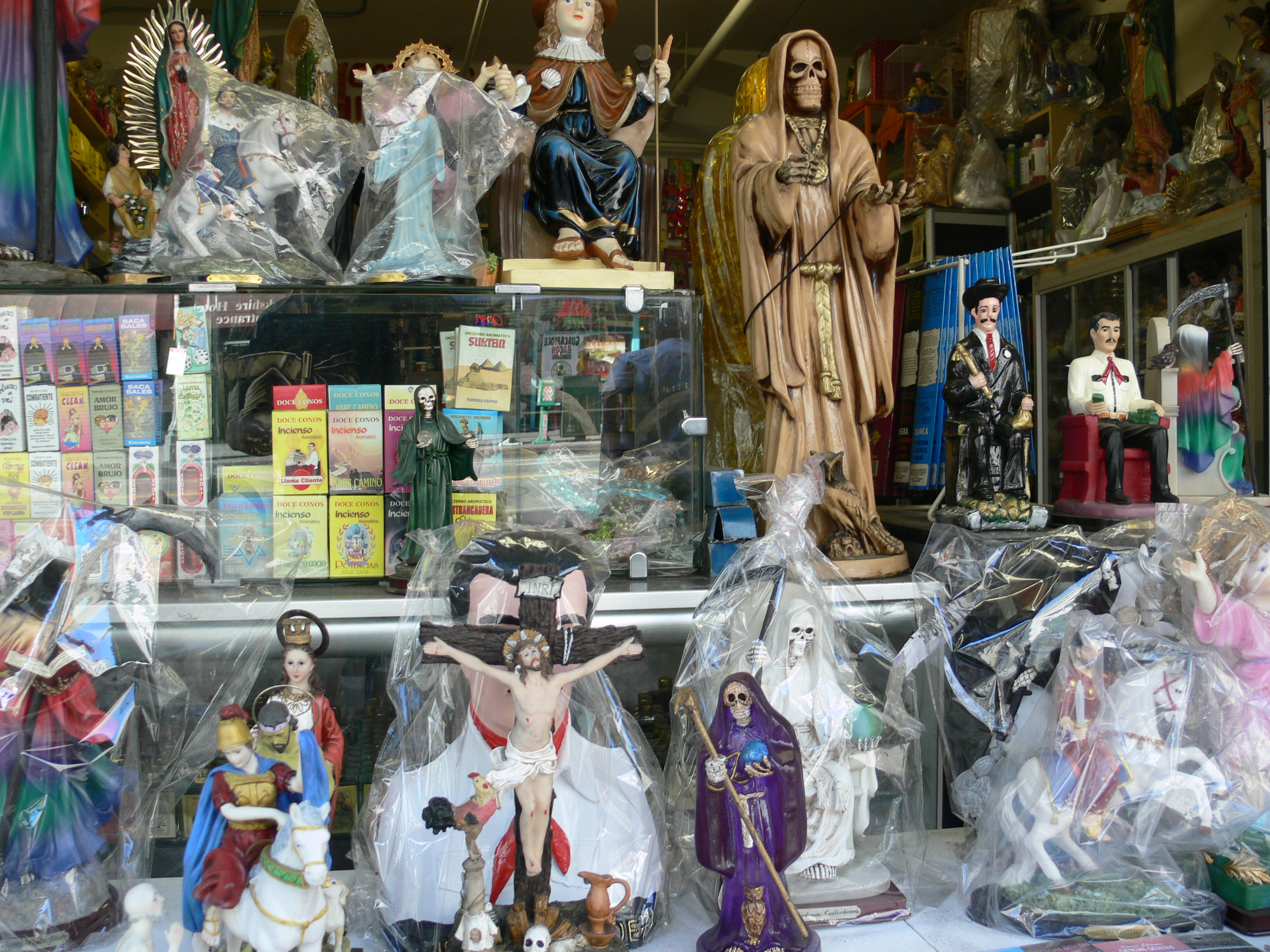
Santa Muerte statues alongside other items of Mexican veneration (Jesus, Mary) on sale at a shop on Broadway in downtown Los Angeles.

Catholicism in Central and South America has been integrated with a number of elements derived from the cultures of the Indigenous peoples of the Americas and enslaved Africans in those areas (see the Caribbean and modern sections). The Catholic Church allows some symbols and traditions to be carried over from older belief systems, so long as they are remade to conform (rather than conflict) with a Christian worldview; syncretism of other religions with the Catholic faith, such as Voudun or Santería, is expressly condemned. The image of Our Lady of Guadalupe and the subsequent devotion to her are seen as assimilating some elements of native Mexican culture into Christianity. Santa Muerte, a female deity of death, has also emerged as the combination of the indigenous goddess Mictecacihuatl and the Lady of Guadalupe. As of 2012, Santa Muerte is worshipped by approximately 5% of the Mexican population, and also has a following in the United States and parts of Central America.

Some Andean areas, such as in Peru, have a strong influence of Inca-originated Quechua culture into Catholicism. This often results in Catholic holy days and festivities featuring Quechua dances or figures, such as the Assumption of Mary celebration in Chinchaypujio, or the fertility celebrations for Pachamama in the mostly Catholic Callalli.

The Lacandon people of Central America acknowledge Äkyantho', the god of foreigners. He has a son named Hesuklistos (Jesus Christ) who is supposed to be the god of the foreigners. They recognize that Hesuklistos is a god but do not feel he is worthy of worship as he is a minor god.

The Lutheran Church–Missouri Synod experienced controversy for disciplining pastors for unionism and syncretism when they participated in multi-faith services in response to the 9/11 attacks and to the shootings at Newtown, Connecticut, on the grounds that joint worship with other Christian denominations or other religious faiths implied that differences between religions are not important.

In the Latter Day Saint movement, doctrine from previous dispensations as recorded in the LDS canon are considered official, though it is accepted that ancient teachings can be warped, misunderstood, or lost as a result of apostasy. While it does not officially recognize doctrine from other religions, it is believed that truth in other sources can be identified via personal revelation.

==== East Asia ====
Catholicism in South Korea has been syncretized with traditional Mahayana Buddhist and Confucian customs that form an integral part of traditional Korean culture. As a result, South Korean Catholics continue to practice a modified form of ancestral rites and observe many Buddhist and Confucian customs and philosophies. In Asia the revolutionary movements of Taiping (19th-century China) and God's Army (Karen in the 1990s) blended Christianity with traditional beliefs. Chinese Independent Churches, with membership up to eighty million, incorporate elements of Protestantism and Chinese folk religion.

==== Southeast Asia ====
An Islamic and Hindu-Buddhist-Animist Syncretist movement in Indonesia known as Abangan was politically and socially active for a while. In the Philippines Folk Catholicism blends religious and magical elements from the precolonial Philippine nations which were practicing either Buddhism, Hinduism, Animism, Islam or other religions; together with Hispano-American Roman Catholicism. An example of this is the Our Lady of Guidance of the Philippines, which was an icon of a Native Hindu-Buddhist Diwata but is treated as an image of the Virgin Mary.

==== Mongolia ====
Khotons follow a syncretic form of Islam that incorporates Buddhist and traditional elements (like Tengrism).

==== Spain ====
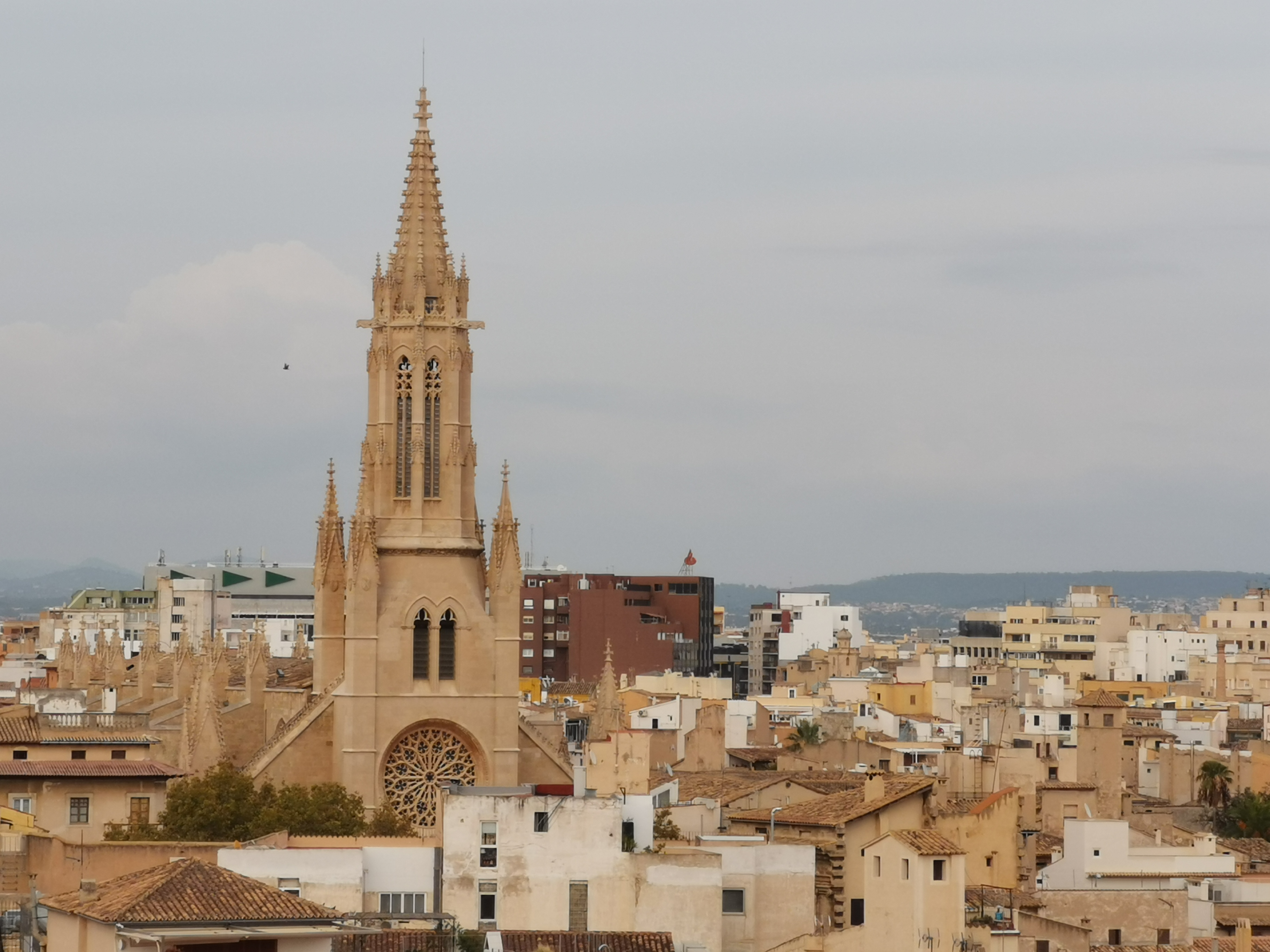
Church of Saint Eulalia in Palma de Mallorca, centers of Xueta religious ritual life.

Xueta Christianity is a syncretic religion on the island of Mallorca, Spain, followed by the Xueta people, who are descendants of persecuted Jews who were converts to Christianity. Traditionally, The church of Saint Eulalia and the church of Montesión (Mount Zion) in Palma de Mallorca have been used by the families of Jewish converts (Xuetas), and both are the centers of Xueta religious ritual life. The Palma's Mont Zion Church was once the main synagogue of Palma de Mallorca. Is estimated that there are roughly 20,000 Chuetas living on the island of Mallorca today, and they practiced strict endogamy by marrying only within their own group.

=== Hinduism and Islam ===
==== Punjab ====
Census reports taken in Punjab Province during the colonial era (British India) noted and documented various practices highlighting religious syncretism among Punjabi Muslims, Punjabi Hindus, and Meo Muslims.

"In other parts of the Province, too, traces of Hindu festivals are noticeable among the Muhammadans. In the western Punjab, Baisakhi, the new year's day of the Hindus, is celebrated as an agricultural festival, by all Muhammadans, by racing bullocks yoked to the well gear, with the beat of tom-toms, and large crowds gather to witness the show, The race is called Baisakhi and is a favourite pastime in the well-irrigated tracts. Then the processions of tazias, in Muharram, with the accompaniment of tom-toms, fencing parties and bands playing on flutes and other musical instruments (which is disapproved by the orthodox Muhammadans) and the establishment of Sabils (shelters where water and sharbat are served out) are clearly influenced by similar practices at Hindu festivals, while the illuminations on occasions like the Chiraghan fair of Shalamar (Lahore) are no doubt practices answering to the holiday-making instinct of the converted Hindus."

"Besides actual conversion, Islam has had a considerable influence on the Hindu religion. The sects of reformers based on a revolt from the orthodoxy of Varnashrama Dharma were obviously the outcome of the knowledge that a different religion could produce equally pious and right thinking men. Laxity in social restrictions also appeared simultaneously in various degrees and certain customs were assimilated to those of the Muhammadans. On the other hand the miraculous powers of Muhammadan saints were enough to attract the saint worshiping Hindus, to allegiance, if not to a total change of faith... The Shamsis are believers in Shah Shamas Tabrez of Multan, and follow the Imam, for the time being, of the Ismailia sect of Shias... they belong mostly to the Sunar caste and their connection with the sect is kept a secret, like Freemasonry. They pass as ordinary Hindus, but their devotion to the Imam is very strong."

"The Meos (Muhammadans) of the eastern Punjab still participate in the observance of the Holi and Diwali festivals. On the latter occasion they paint the horns, hoofs, etc., of their bullocks and join in the general rejoicings".

— Excerpts from the Census of India (Punjab Province), 1911 AD

==== Bengal ====
Similar to that of Punjab, census reports conducted in British India highlighted syncretic practices among Bengali Hindus and Muslims.

"That both were originally of the same race seems sufficiently clear, not only from comparisons to physical characteristics, but from the similarity of their language, manners and customs. The Bengali Musalman is still in many respects a Hindu. Caste distinction, one of the main objects of which would seem to be to prescribe the limits of the jus connubii, are to a certain extent as prevalent and as fully recognised among the Mohammedans of Bengal, as among Hindus. As Buchanan pointed out sixty years ago, they not unfrequently meet at the same shrine, both invoking the same object of worship though perhaps under different names. Instead of commending a letter "In the name of God" (which is the orthodox fashion), the Bengali Musalman will superscribe the name of some Hindu deity. He speaks the same language, and uses precisely the same nomenclature and the same expressions of thought as his Hindu neighbor. Their very names are identical, the prefix of Shaikh alone distinguishing the convert to Islam."

— Excerpts from "The Census of Bengal", 1874 AD, Page 87

In the Sundarbans (spread across Indian state of West Bengal and Bangladesh), it is noted that Bonbibi, a guardian spirit of the forests is venerated by Hindus and Muslim residents alike. In most of the shrines of Banbibi in the Sundarbans, Banbibi is most commonly worshipped along with her brother Shah Jangali and Dakkhin Rai.

Bauls are a group of mynstric minstrels who put emphasis on their mystical elements with the tradition of music. Baul tradition is essentially an amalgamation of Vaishnavism and Sufism. Baul has had a considerable effect on Bengali culture. Baul traditions are included in the list of Masterpieces of the Oral and Intangible Heritage of Humanity.

==== Balochistan ====
Being a religious minority in the region for centuries, colonial officials found that indigenous Baloch Hindus developed a form of religious syncretism that incorporated many aspects of Islam into their cultures and traditions, greatly differing from the forms of orthodox Hinduism practiced in other parts of the subcontinent. Furthermore, caste and family ancestry was often difficult to ascertain, as Hindus indigenous to the Balochistan region mainly solely identified as a member of their respective Baloch tribe, typically unknowing of their caste background.

"Proverbially elastic though the term is, Hinduism is stretched almost to breaking point in Baluchistan. It is not merely that the Hinduism of the domiciled Hindu families widely different from the Hinduism they see practised among the alien immigrants; there is precious little in their religion that would pass for Hinduism in more enlightened parts of India. It almost looks as if the singular freedom from persecution which the old Hindu families have always enjoyed at the hands of their Musalman over-lords had given Islam greater scope to impart its subtle influence to their inward beliefs and outward practices. Knowing no sacred books but the Sikh scriptures, and with priests (Brahmans though they may be) as ignorant of the Shastras as themselves, these benighted Hindus have allowed nearly all their rites and ceremonies to become coloured with an Islamic tinge. They reverently resort to Muhammadan shrines; they invoke Muhammadan saints; in times of trouble they are glad of the help of charm mongering mullahs. It is not uncommon to find them observing Muhammadan fasts, or participating in the Muharram and other Muhammadan festivals."
"The Hindus of Kalat town — undoubtedly among the oldest in the community — claim to be offshoots of the mysterious Sewa dynasty that ruled in Kalat centuries before the Brahui Confederacy took shape. But though the Bhatia of Las Bela punctiliously refer their advent to the year 708 A.D., and the Hindus of Lahri tell in all good faith of their journeyings from Aleppo with Chakar the Rind, the early history of these old Hindu families is hopelessly befogged. Everything, however, seems to point to the western Panjab and Sind as the countries from which most of them came, though isolated families in Nushki may have immigrated by way of Afghanistan, and a few others may have wandered in from the far corners of India. Originally they may have been as diverse as the villages from which they came and the dates of their coming. Today the old Hindu families form a more or less homogeneous community. In particular customs no doubt they vary considerably; but common environment has set its common mark on them all. And it is in the effect of an alien environment on Hindus and Hindu caste that the main interest in these old trading families of Baluchistan is centred."
"Except in Quetta, where the Hindu community has become so overgrown that conditions are abnormal, neither caste nor sub-caste enters into their composition: there is nothing incongruous or unusual in a Panchayat subscribing impartially to a Sikh Dharamsala and to the worship of a Devi or of Darya Pir; or in a Panchayat (like that of Chuharkot in Barkhan) which is composed almost wholly of Aroras having a Brahman as its president. In other words, a Panchayat is a Panchayat not of caste-members but of the whole body of Hindus in a village community. It is indeed almost always sheer waste of time to question a member of one of these old Hindu families regarding his caste. Brahman he knows and Musalman he knows; and it is enough for him that he is neither the one nor the other, but a Hindu pure and simple. Most of the families are undoubtedly Arora; some few are very possibly Khatri; the Bhatia of Las Bela are probably Rajput. But these are distinctions too nice for a local Hindu; it is more than possible that he may never have heard the terms before. Nevertheless, though his mind may be a blank as to the name of his caste, he can sometimes give the name of his sub-caste—possibly a hoary name like Ahuja, possibly a newly coined name like Ramzai or Panjazai, modelled on the name of a tribal section. But it is merely a matter of names after all. The Ramzai and the Panjazai and the Ahuja may have each some cherished peculiarities of their own. But such peculiarities strike no discord between them. The old Hindu families are a brotherhood of equals; among themselves they know no distinctions valid enough to influence the intercourse of everyday life."

— Excerpts from the Census of India, 1911 AD

==== Khyber Pakhtunkhwa ====
In a similar manner to the Baloch Hindus to the south, Hindus belonging to the various castes and tribes who were indigenous to the frontier regions had considerable Islamic influence, owing to their status as a religious minority in the region for centuries, and thus formed religious syncretism that incorporated aspects from both faiths into their cultures and traditions. Furthermore, caste differentiation amongst the Hindus of the region was often greatly diminished, in contrast with the Hindus of regions further to the east in the Gangetic plain such as eastern Punjab or the United Provinces.

"The names returned as those of Hindu sects are very numerous amounting in all to 359 different entries. Many of those are caste and tribes such as Agarwal, Arora, Brahman, Bhat, Bhatiara, Chamar, Chuhra, Dhobi, Dogra, Gorkha, Jat, Meo and the like. Some indicate occupations of occupational castes as for instance, Zamindar, Mahajan, Bhishti, Mallah, Nai and Hajjam. A good many more are clan or family names like Kapoor, Sarsut, Muhial, Utradi and Janjua."
"Hinduism, as it exists in the North-West Frontier Province, is but a pale reflection of the system which flourishes in the United Provinces and other areas to the east. Even of the Derajat, where, as we have seen, the Hindu population is proportionately most numerous, the writer of the Dera Ismail Khan Gazetteer notes, "the Hindus of this district are less particular in the matter of caste prejudices and observances than down country Hindus. Most of them will drink water that has been carried in Mussaks (skins for carrying water) or out of lotas detached from a working well. They habitually ride on donkeys and do a multitude of other things which an orthodox Hindu would shrink from. All idolatrous observances are kept very much in the background. Except a few small images (thakurs) kept in their mandirs they have no idols at all. Nor is it their habit to take their gods about in procession. No one, in fact, sees anything of their worship. They burn their dead, and throw the ashes into the Indus. They always keep a few of the bones, and take them, when the opportunity offers, to the Ganges... There are a good many dharamsalas, mandirs, and dawaras at Dera Ismail Khan and in the cis-Indus tehsils"."
"The marriage customs of the Hindus have been influenced by Islam, notably in regard to the age of marriage... Hindu rules regarding commensality between different castes have been relaxed... any distinct caste organization is virtually non-existent in rural areas. Outside the towns Hindus still live in a condition of dependance on their Mohammadan overlords. The Arora, the Khatri, or the Bhatia shop-keeper in a village is a hamsaya of the proprietors of the land; that is to say, he lives rent free in a house which does not belong to him, and in return for this, and for being allowed to reside unmolested in the village, has to render certain services to his protectors."

— Excerpts from the Census of India (North-West Frontier Province), 1911 AD

=== Sikh ===
Similarly to other revealed religions, Sikhi believers consider Sikhism to be an independent religion and reject being viewed as a syncretic religion that is the result of combining other religious traditions. Nevertheless, in a manner reminiscent of the latter-day Clash of Civilizations thesis, the Sikh religion emerged within the geography of clashing peripheral intersections between the social, political, and civilisational influences of Islam, Hindu, and shades of Buddhism, across Punjab and adjacent territories. The intersecting dynamics were such that the revealed synthesis of Sikh scripture and identity developed in mutual dialectic (syncretic) relationship with the diverse political and religious influences that were extant across the localities of the Sikh birthland.

=== Baháʼí Faith ===
The Baháʼís follow Bahá'u'lláh, a prophet whom they consider a successor to Muhammad, Jesus, Moses, Buddha, Zoroaster, Krishna and Abraham. This acceptance of other religious founders has encouraged some to regard the Baháʼí religion as a syncretic faith. However, in their 1997 and 2000 publications, Stockman and Smith respectively observed that Baháʼís and the Baháʼí literature explicitly reject this view. Stockman and Smith indicated that Baháʼís consider Bahá'u'lláh's revelation an independent, though related, revelation from God and that its relationship to earlier dispensations is seen as analogous to the relationship of Christianity to Judaism. Stockman and Smith regarded the beliefs held in common as evidence of truth, progressively revealed by God throughout human history, and culminating in (at the time of Stockman and Smith's writing) the Baháʼí revelation. Stockman and Smith identified that Baháʼís have their own sacred scripture, interpretations, laws, and practices, which Stockman and Smith observed that, for Baháʼís, supersede those of other faiths at the time of recording their observations in 1997 and 2000.

Nevertheless, the Bahá'í Faith's explicit emphasis on nurturing or synthesising the general development of unity in diversity across the world is intended to have a generative influence on the syncretic and synthetic emergence of intercultural, pluricultural, and multicultural paradigms in religion and society.

=== Caribbean and Afro-American ===
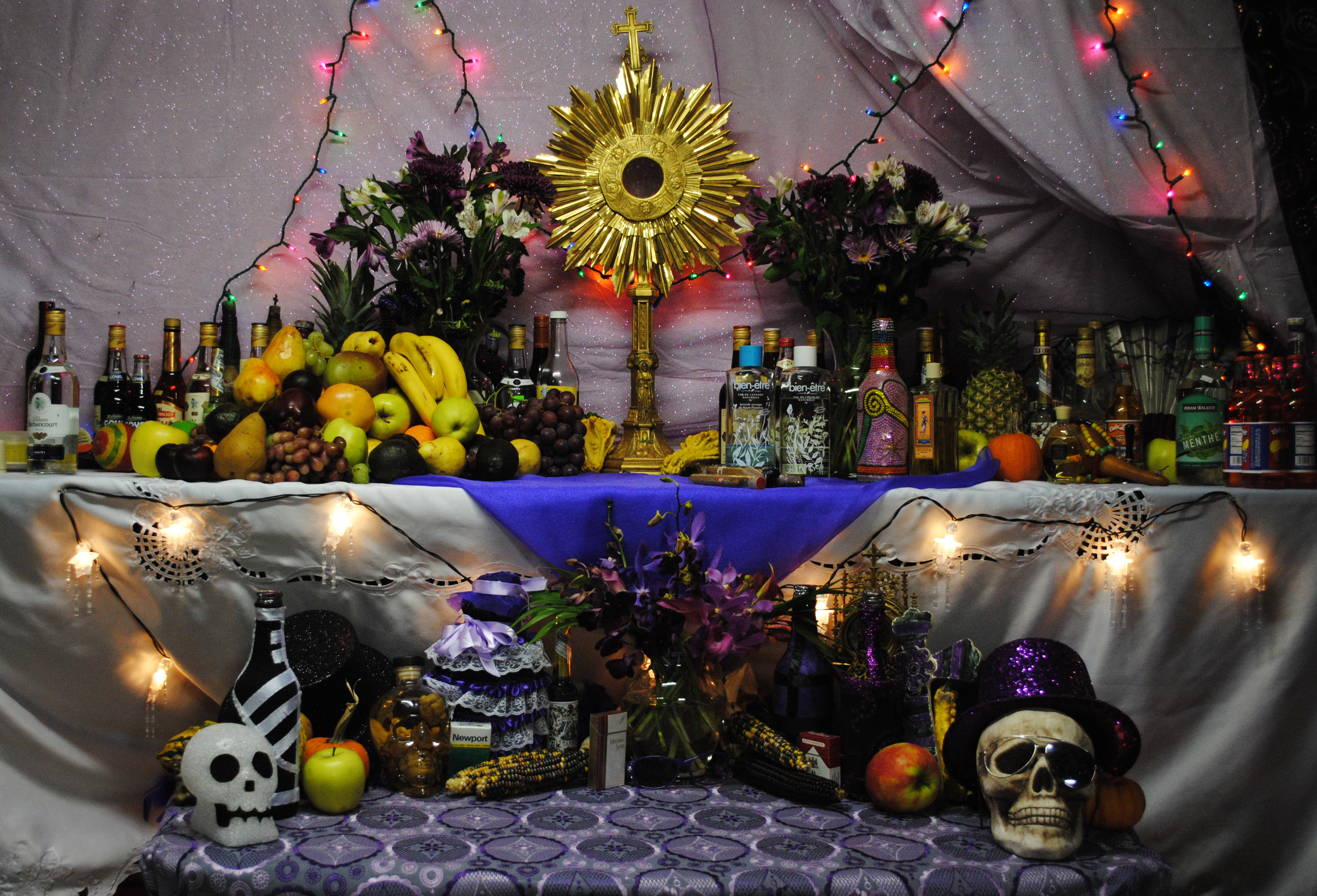
Vodou altar celebrating Papa Guédé in Boston, Massachusetts, featuring offerings to Rada spirits, the Petwo family, and the Gede. In the center is a golden monstrance.

The process of syncretism in the Caribbean region often forms a part of cultural creolization. (The technical term "Creole" may apply to anyone born and raised in the region, regardless of race.) The shared histories of the Caribbean islands include long periods of European Imperialism (mainly by Spain, France, and Great Britain) and the importation of African slaves (primarily from Central and Western Africa). The influences of each of the above interacted in varying degrees on the islands, producing the fabric of society that exists today in the Caribbean.

The Rastafari movement, founded in Jamaica, syncretizes vigorously, mixing elements from the Bible (specifically Protestantism), Marcus Garvey's Pan-Africanism movement, a text from the European grimoire tradition, the Sixth and Seventh Books of Moses, Hinduism, and Caribbean culture.

Another highly syncretic religion of the area, vodou, combines elements of Western African, native Caribbean, and Christian (especially Roman Catholic) beliefs.

Recently developed religious systems that exhibit marked syncretism include the African diasporic religions Candomblé, Vodou and Santería, which analogize various Yorùbá and other African deities to the Roman Catholic saints. Some sects of Candomblé have also incorporated Native American deities, and Umbanda combined African deities with Kardecist spiritualism.

Hoodoo is a similarly derived form of folk magic practiced by some African American communities in the Southern United States. Other traditions of syncretic folk religion in North America include Louisiana Voodoo as well as Pennsylvania Dutch Pow-wow, in which practitioners invoke power through the Christian God.

A Hindu tradition can be found in the Caribbean, particularly among the Indo-Caribbean Tamil diaspora, that is known as Caribbean Shaktism. It has its origins in the Mariamman cults of Tamil Nadu, and was brought to the Caribbean via the Girmityas. Later in the Caribbean, it started to be syncretized with Vedic Hinduism due to the contact between North Indian Girmityas and Tamil Girmityas. Later on in their arrival, the practice was syncretized/influenced by Roman Catholicism to varying degrees. In Guyana, the syncretic Hindu-Dravidian practice was maintained with minimal Catholic syncretism, while in Trinidad and Tobago, some mandirs house statues of Saints and Catholic figures such as Jesus and the Virgin Mary. In Martinique, a unique practice known as Maldevidan Spiritism developed among the Tamil community in the North coast which was fully syncretic, where Hindu and Tamil deities were syncretized with saints.

=== Other ===
Omnism is the belief in all religions with their gods.

Many historical Native American religious movements have incorporated Christian European influence, like the Native American Church, that teaches a combination of traditional Native American beliefs and Christianity, with sacramental use of the entheogen peyote. Further examples in North America are the Ghost Dance, and the religion of Handsome Lake.

Santo Daime is a syncretic religion founded in Brazil that incorporates elements of several religious or spiritual traditions including Folk Catholicism, Kardecist Spiritism, African animism, and indigenous South American shamanism, including vegetalismo.

Unitarian Universalism also provides an example of a modern syncretic religion. It traces its roots to Universalist and Unitarian Christian congregations. However, modern Unitarian Universalism freely incorporates elements from other religious and non-religious traditions, so that it no longer identifies as "Christian".

The Theosophical Society professes to go beyond being a syncretic movement that combines deities into an elaborate Spiritual Hierarchy, and assembles evidence that points to an underlying (or occult) reality of Being that is universal and interconnected, common to all spirit-matter dualities. It is maintained that this is the source of religious belief, each religion simply casting that one reality through the prism of that particular time and in a way that is meaningful to their circumstances.

Universal Sufism seeks the unity of all people and religions. Universal Sufis strive to "realize and spread the knowledge of Unity, the religion of Love, and Wisdom, so that the biases and prejudices of faiths and beliefs may, of themselves, fall away, the human heart overflow with love, and all hatred caused by distinctions and differences be rooted out."

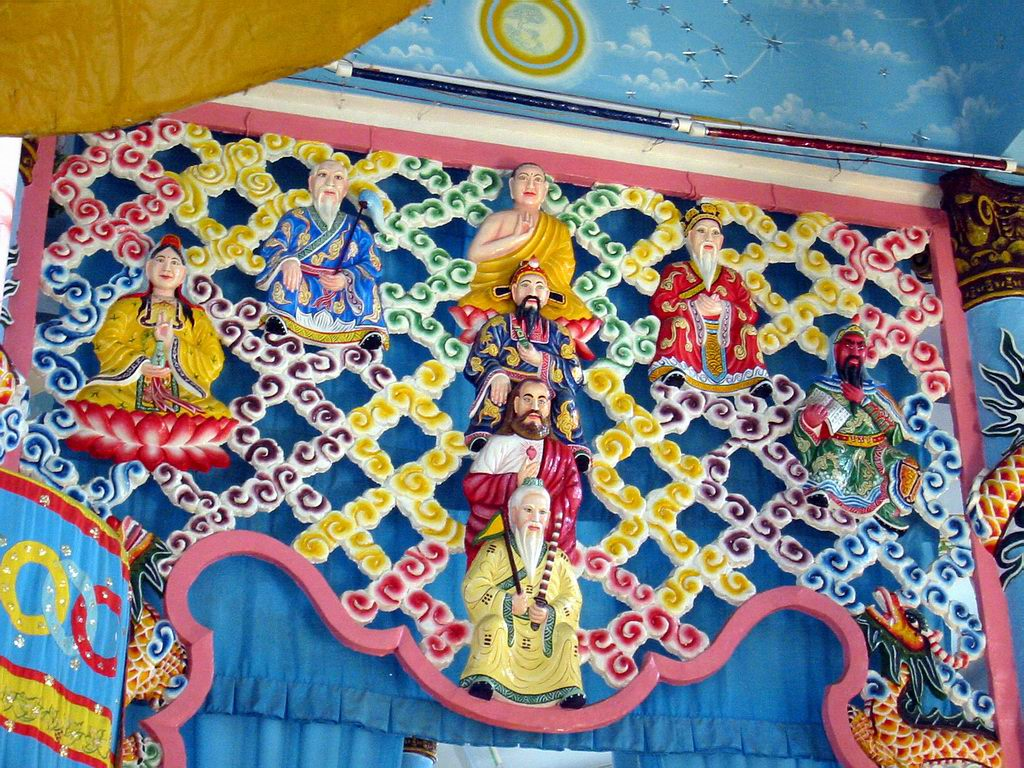
Cao Dai Temple: On top is Buddha, on his right Lao Tzu, on his left Confucius. Under Buddha is Li Bai. On Li Bai's right is the female Boddhisattva Guanyin, on his left is the red-faced warrior Guan Gong. Below Li Bai is Jesus, and below Jesus is Jiang Ziya.

In Vietnam, Caodaism blends elements of Buddhism, Catholicism, and Taoism.

Several Japanese new religions, such as Konkokyo and Seicho-No-Ie, are syncretistic.

The Nigerian religion Chrislam combines Pentecostal Christianity and Islamic doctrines. Nigerian Yoruba people, which amount to almost fifty million, combine mainly Protestant Christianity and Islamic practices.

African Initiated Churches demonstrate an integration of Protestant and traditional African religion. Upper estimates of membership in African Initiated Churches reach up to a few hundred million. In West-Central Africa, modern Bwiti incorporates animism, ancestor worship, ritual use of iboga, and Christianity into a syncretistic belief system.

Thelema is a mixture of many different schools of belief and practice, including Hermeticism, Eastern Mysticism, Yoga, 19th century libertarian philosophies (i.e. Nietzsche), occultism, and the Kabbalah, as well as ancient Egyptian and Greek religion.

Examples of strongly syncretistic Romantic and modern movements with some religious elements include mysticism, occultism, Theosophical Society, modern astrology, Neopaganism, and the New Age movement.

Many of India's estimated fifty million Pentecostals have syncretic blends with Indian religions. In Réunion, some Malbars practice at same time Hinduism and Christianity. but separately, not mixed (this is called "dual religious practice" in French "double pratique religieuse") but it's not considered as syncretism

The Unification Church, founded by religious leader Sun Myung Moon in South Korea in 1954, has teachings based on the Bible, but includes new interpretations not found in mainstream Judaism and Christianity and incorporates East Asian traditions.

== See also ==
- Inclusivism
- Sheilaism
- Folk religion
- Interfaith dialogue
- Religious pluralism
- Religious toleration
- Ganga-Jamuni tehzeeb
- New religious movement
- Multiple religious belonging
- Polytheism
- Creolization
- Afro-Brazilian religion
  - Candomblé
  - Umbanda
- Folk saints
- Afro-American religions

== Literature ==
- Anita Maria Leopold, Jeppe Sinding Jensen, Syncretism in Religion: A Reader, Routledge (2016).
- Eric Maroney, SCM Core Text: Religious Syncretism, SCM Press (2006)
- Kloft, Hans (2010). Mysterienkulte der Antike. Götter, Menschen, Rituale (in German). Munich: C.H. Beck. ISBN 978-3-406-44606-1.
