= Eshan =

Eshan may refer to:

- Eshan Yi Autonomous County, Yuxi, Yunnan Province, China
- Eshan Hilal, Indian belly dancer
- Eshan Nayeck (died 1987), Mauritian convicted murderer

== See also ==
- Esan (disambiguation)
- Ishan (disambiguation)
- Eshani, a town and union council of Barkhan District, Balochistan, Pakistan
- Eshen, Iran
