= Ishaan =

Ishaan is a given name of Indian origin. Notable people with the name include:

- Ishaan Bhatnagar (born 2002), Indian badminton player
- Ishaan Dev, Indian musical artist
- Ishaan Dhawan (born 1995), Indian television actor
- Ishaan Gadekar (born 1997), Indian cricketer
- Ishaan Ghose, Indian cinematographer
- Ishaan Ghosh (born 2000), Indian musician
- Hazrat Ishaan (1563–1642), Sufi saint from Bokhara
- Ishaan Khatter (born 1995), Indian actor
- Ishaan Madesh (born 2008), Indian motorsports athlete
- Ishaan Singh Manhas (born 1988), Indian television actor
- Ishaan Shishodia (born 2005), Indian footballer
- Ishaan Tharoor (born 1984), American journalist

== Other uses ==
- Ishaan: Sapno Ko Awaaz De, teen drama created by Disney Channel India, known mononymously as Ishaan
- Ishaanism

== See also ==
- Ishan (disambiguation)
