= Esan =

Esan or ESAN may refer to:

== Nigeria ==
- Esan people, an ethnic group of southern Nigeria
- Esan language, an Edoid language spoken by the Esan people
- Esanland, a cultural region and senatorial district of Nigeria, where the Esan people live
- Esan Central, LGA in Nigeria
- Esan North-East, LGA in Nigeria
- Esan South-East, LGA in Nigeria
- Esan West, LGA in Nigeria

== Other countries ==
- Esan, Hokkaido, a former town in Japan now part of Hakodate, Hokkaido
- Mount Esan, a volcano in Hakodate, Hokkaido
- ESAN University, a university in Lima, Peru
- Isan, also known as Esan, a region of Thailand

== See also ==
- Eshan (disambiguation)
- Ishan (disambiguation)
- Isan (disambiguation)
