= Ishan, Iran =

Ishan, Iran may refer to:

- Ayjan
- Eshen
- Eyshan
