= Isan (disambiguation) =

Isan is a region of Thailand.

Isan or ISAN may also refer to:

- Isan (band), a British electronic music group
- Isan (town), a town in Thailand
- Isan people, an ethno-regional group of people native to Northeastern Thailand
- Isan language, the collective name for the dialects of the Lao language as they are spoken in Thailand
- Isan, a dialect of the Yopno language of Papua New Guinea
- Institute for Spectroscopy Russian Academy of Sciences
- InStore Audio Network, a supplier of background music for supermarkets and drugstores
- International Society for Autonomic Neuroscience
- International Standard Audiovisual Number, a unique identifier for audiovisual works

== People ==
- Saint Isan, 6th-century saint of South Wales
- Isan Díaz (born 1996), Puerto Rican baseball player
- Isan Reiyu, the Japanese name of Zen Master Guishan Lingyou (771-853)
- Isan Reynaldo Ortiz Suárez (born 1985), Cuban chess grandmaster

== See also ==
- Isani (Tbilisi Metro), a metro station in Tbilisi, Georgia
- Isa (disambiguation), of which Isan may be an adjective form
- Esan (disambiguation) of Nigeria, which can refer to the region, people, and language
