= Saddar Barkhan =

Pakistani town and administrative area

- Town and union council
- Country: Pakistan
- Region: Balochistan
- District: Barkhan District
- Time zone: UTC+5 (PST)

Saddar Barkhan is a town and union council of Barkhan District in the Balochistan province of Pakistan.
