= Isanavarman =

Isanavarman may refer to:

- Isanavarman I, king of Chenla
- Ishanavarman, also spelled Iśanavarman, ruler of Kannauj
- Ishanavarman II, also spelled Isanavarman II, Angkorian king

== See also ==
- Ishan (disambiguation)
- Varman (disambiguation)
