= Ishan (disambiguation) =

Īshān is an honorific title given to Sufi leaders in Central Asia.

Ishan may also refer to:

- Ishan, Iran (disambiguation)
- Esan (disambiguation)

== See also ==
- Eshan (disambiguation)
- Isanavarman (disambiguation)
- Ishana, a Hindu guardian deity
- Ishant Sharma, an Indian cricketer
