= Barkhan District =

Barkhan بارکھان
- District
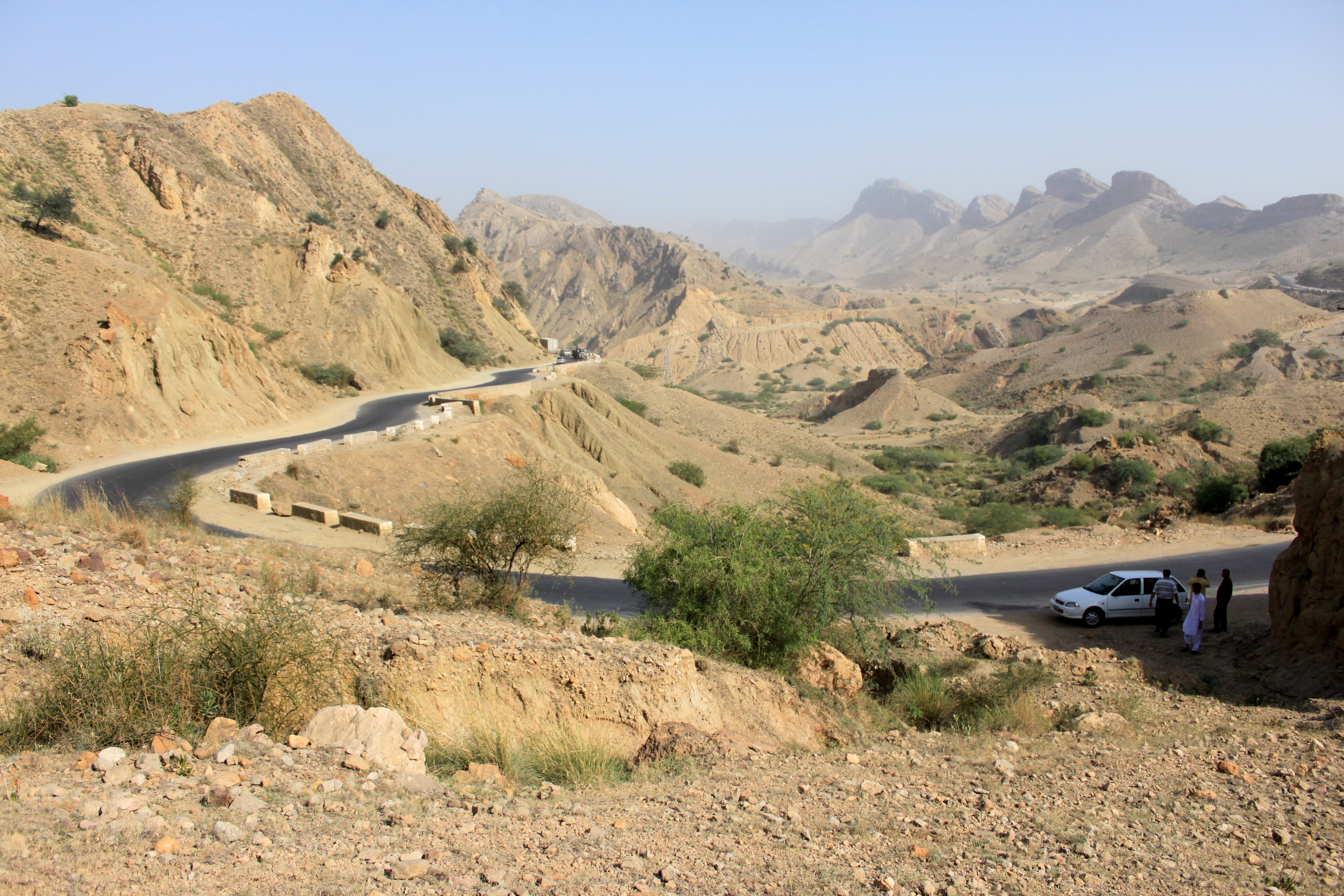
- Mountain road in Barkhan District

- Map of Barkhan District
- Coordinates: 29.54°N 69.31°E
- Country: Pakistan
- Province: Balochistan
- Division: Koh e Sulaiman
- Established: 31 December 1991

Government
  - Type: District Administration
  - Deputy Commissioner: N/A
  - District Police Officer: N/A
  - District Health Officer: N/A

Area
  - District: 3,514 km^{2} (1,357 sq mi)
- Elevation: 1,098 m (3,602 ft)

Population (2023)
  - District: 210,249
  - Density: 59.83/km^{2} (155.0/sq mi)
  - Urban: 14,425 (6.86%)
  - Rural: 195,824 (93.14%)

Literacy
  - Literacy rate: Total: (33.62%); Male: (41.63%); Female: (24.93%)
- Time zone: UTC+5 (PKT)
- Postal code: 84400
- Dialling code: 0829

Barkhan (Balochi: بارخان, Urdu: بارخان,) is a district in the province of Balochistan in Pakistan. It shares its borders with the province of Punjab to the east and the Balochistan districts of Dera Bugti to the south, Kohlu to the west, Loralai to the northwest and Musakhel to the north. The town of Barkhan serves as the district's headquarters. It was granted the status of a separate district on 31 December 1991, prior to which it was a tehsil of Loralai District. In 11 July 2026 Rarasham was given status of Tehsil and was merged with Barkhan district from Musakhel district due to will of Buzdar tribe in joining newly created Koh e Sulaiman division.

== History ==
The early history of District Barkhan is obscure, but it is said that this area remained under Muslim rulers and conquerors of Kandahar and India.

Baro Khan the founder of the Barozai family of Pannis was a great fighter who came to Barkhan with his tribal people. As such, this valley was named Bar Khan, but with the passage of time it was called Barkhan. The Khetran country was one of the sub-districts of Sewistan and of the Hind Province of Thatta. In Akbar's time it was called Janjah.

Khetran is a Baloch tribe. Mir Girazo Khan Baloch was first sardar of the Khetrans. He was succeeded by his son Bakhtiar Khan, who was succeeded by Mir Haji Khan, whose rule is memorable among the Khetrans for a defeat which he inflicted on the Zhob, Kakars.

Mir Haji Khan was succeeded by a few nominal chiefs. Mir Haji Khan was a strong man, and the Khetrans prospered under him. He also took revenge on the defeat of the Khetrans from Marris by destroying the fort at Mawand of Karam Khan Bijrani Marri. Haji Khan died, leaving three sons: Umar Khan, Nawab Khan and Balu Khan.

Yet he was succeeded by his brother Sayed Khan, who was elected by the Khetrans. He too died, leaving three sons: Dost Muhammad, Sorni Khan and Kadir Bakhsh. Syed Khan was succeeded by his brother Balul Khan. Babul Khan was however opposed by Nawab Khan and Kadir Bakhsh. Kadir Bakhsh went to the Marris and gave his stepmother in marriage to Gazan, the Marri Chief and led Marris Lashkar against the Khetrans, who lost many lives and property during the fights. Sir Robert Sandeman (then Deputy Commissioner, D.G. Khan), however, intervened and made peace between Kadir Bakhsh and Babul Khan.

=== British Raj ===
Due to prolonged war among Khetrans, Lunis and Marris, in 1880, the Khetrans submitted a petition to the British authorities at D.G Khan, offering to pay revenue and to be taken under British protection. The Khetrans' country remained under the political control of the British authorities of D.G Khan from 1878 to 1883. In 1883, Sardar Baloch Khan met Mr Bruce, the Political Agent of Thaal Chotiali, with a Jirga of his tribesmen. This settled the dispute between the Khetrans, Luni and Marris.

In 1884, the Khetrans came under the authority of the Agent to the Governor General in Balochistan. The Leghari Barkhan circle, comprising two valleys, Barkhan and Vitakari, was transferred from Punjab control to Balochistan control in 1884. This district, from where the Leghari tribe migrated to Dera Ghazi Khan, was brought under the direct administration of Balochistan in 1887, when work on the construction of D.G Khan - Pishin Road was started and a Tehsildar was posted at Barkhan. In 1889, Barkhan tehsil was transferred to the Zhob Agency with headquarters at Loralai.

This tehsil however was transferred again to Thal Chotaili Agency in 1892. In October 1903, the Thal Chotaili and Zhob Agencies were remodeled and three new agencies were created: Sibi, Loralai and Zhob. The Barkhan Tehsil was transferred to the Loralai Agency.

== Administration ==
Tehsil	Area (km²)	Pop. (2023)	Density (ppl/km²) (2023)	Literacy rate (2023)	Union Councils
Barkhan Tehsil	3,514	210,249	59.83	33.62%	...

== Geography ==
Barkhan is the eighth-smallest district of Balochistan and has an area of 3,410 square kilometers. Barkhan District lies between 69°3'-70° 4' East longitude and 29°37'-30°21' North latitude, consisting of one tehsil and eight union councils. The location of Barkhan is 541 km (aerial distance) south-west (220 degrees bearing) of Pakistan's capital city Islamabad and 245 km east (97 degrees bearing) from Quetta City, the provincial capital of Balochistan.

=== Topography ===
The landscape of Barkhan consists of plains, valleys and mountains varying in ground elevation ranging from 841 to 2,031 meters above Mean Sea Level (MSL). The district consists of one main valley, called Barkhan, and several smaller valleys, which are separated from the main valley by low ranges of hills running in a southwest direction. The Barkhan valley is enclosed on the north side by scattered low hills, which divide the drainage water of the valley from the waters flowing into the Rakhni stream in the southwest, and on the west and northwest side by the great Jandran range. The valley ends in the Vitakari valley.

To the east of the Sukha range is the Kharcha valley, which is bounded by the Phulai range on the east. The hills in the district belong to the Suleman range; the principal hills are known as Kala Pahar in the north, Karwada, Bibar, Jandra and Mar or Mukhmar in the west, Andari and Sukha in the south, Phulai and Khawaj in the east, and Mazara, Tagha, Dig and Deka in the centre and Rakhni areas. The ranges mostly consist of earth sand and stones; some portions are rocky and not easily accessible. The Jandran range is mostly rocky. In the south runs the Han stream with its tributaries. The Han stream runs in a southwest direction and carries the drainage of the Han pass and the southeastern slopes of the Jandran range. At Dhamani (Barkhan Tehsil) the stream becomes perennial up to its junction with the Kah River in Dera Ghazi Khan district. Dhaula stream, its tributary, brings water from the hills situated to the south of the Bagha valley and irrigates a number of villages in the Barkhan valley and joins Han in Vitakari. Rakhni and Han join Kah Stream which then passes into the district of Dera Ghazi Khan.

A third important stream is Bala Dhaka. This stream lies in Berg-Sham Mauza of the Barkhan Tehsil. The stream is a tributary of the Narechi River (Duki Tehsil). Water in this stream comes down from the southwestern slopes of hills located north of the Han pass. The stream irrigates a very small area of Mauza Berg-Sham, and then its water passes in the Duki Tehsil.

=== Archaeological sites ===
During geological mapping and bio-stratigraphic research activity in Barkhan District, the geologists of the Geological Survey of Pakistan (GSP) discovered the first dinosaur fossils in Pakistan.

=== Khetranisaurus ===
District Barkhan made headlines when million years old fossils of a dinosaurs was found in the area of Vatakari.

Etymology; Khetrani, honoring the Khetran tribe of Barkhan district; saurus means reptiles. The species specific epithet barkhani, honoring the Barkhan which is the host District of dinosaurs.

=== Climate ===
Barkhan has a hot semi-arid climate (Köppen climate classification BSh) with very hot summers and mild winters. Precipitation mainly falls in two distinct periods: light to moderate rain in the late winter and early spring from February to April, and heavier rain in the monsoon from June to September.

Climate data for Barkhan
Month	Jan	Feb	Mar	Apr	May	Jun	Jul	Aug	Sep	Oct	Nov	Dec	Year
Record high °C (°F)	25.0 (77.0)	26.7 (80.1)	33.0 (91.4)	39.0 (102.2)	42.8 (109.0)	44.2 (111.6)	42.3 (108.1)	41.6 (106.9)	40.8 (105.4)	37.0 (98.6)	32.2 (90.0)	28.0 (82.4)	44.2 (111.6)
Mean daily maximum °C (°F)	16.2 (61.2)	17.5 (63.5)	23.3 (73.9)	30.0 (86.0)	35.1 (95.2)	37.8 (100.0)	35.4 (95.7)	34.4 (93.9)	33.5 (92.3)	29.9 (85.8)	24.2 (75.6)	18.9 (66.0)	28.0 (82.4)
Daily mean °C (°F)	10.1 (50.2)	11.7 (53.1)	17.1 (62.8)	23.5 (74.3)	28.6 (83.5)	31.0 (87.8)	29.5 (85.1)	28.7 (83.7)	27.0 (80.6)	23.0 (73.4)	17.3 (63.1)	12.2 (54.0)	21.6 (71.0)
Mean daily minimum °C (°F)	4.1 (39.4)	6.4 (43.5)	11.1 (52.0)	17.1 (62.8)	22.1 (71.8)	24.4 (75.9)	23.7 (74.7)	23.1 (73.6)	20.5 (68.9)	15.9 (60.6)	10.4 (50.7)	5.6 (42.1)	15.4 (59.7)
Record low °C (°F)	−1.7 (28.9)	−2.2 (28.0)	2.0 (35.6)	6.1 (43.0)	13.0 (55.4)	13.0 (55.4)	15.7 (60.3)	16.7 (62.1)	13.9 (57.0)	9.0 (48.2)	2.0 (35.6)	−10 (14)	−10 (14)
Average precipitation mm (inches)	12.2 (0.48)	21.7 (0.85)	35.4 (1.39)	32.3 (1.27)	17.8 (0.70)	35.3 (1.39)	108.8 (4.28)	95.5 (3.76)	43.4 (1.71)	3.6 (0.14)	5.8 (0.23)	6.8 (0.27)	418.6 (16.47)
Source: NOAA (1971-1990)

== Demographics ==
Historical population
Year	Pop.	±% p.a.
1951	...	—
1961	29,756	—
1972	44,704	+3.77%
1981	61,686	+3.64%
1998	103,545	+3.09%
2017	171,025	+2.68%
2023	210,249	+3.50%

=== Population ===
As of the 2023 census, Barkhan district has 23,053 households and a population of 210,249. The district has a sex ratio of 108.95 males to 100 females and a literacy rate of 33.62%: 41.63% for males and 24.93% for females. 84,790 (40.33% of the surveyed population) are under 10 years of age. 14,425 (6.86%) live in urban areas.

=== Religion ===
Religion in contemporary Barkhan District
Religious group	1941		2017		2023	
Religious group	Pop.	%	Pop.	%	Pop.	%
Islam	21,578	96.24%	170,943	99.5%	209,755	99.07%
Hinduism	824	3.67%	850	0.53%	1,400	0.7%
Christianity	17	0.08%	17	0.01%	462	0.22%
Others	3	0.01%	8	0.01%	28	0.01%
Total Population	22,422	100%	171,025	100%	210,249	100%
Note: 1941 census data is for Barkhan tehsil of erstwhile Loralai Agency, which roughly corresponds to contemporary Barkhan district. District and tehsil borders have changed since 1941.

=== Language ===
Languages of Barkhan district (2023)
1. Balochi (98.6%)
2. Saraiki (0.60%)
3. Pashto (0.54%)
4. Others (0.24%)

At the time of the 2023 census, 98.62% of the population spoke Balochi, 0.6% spoke Saraiki, and 0.54% Pashto as their first language.

There is also a sizeable community of speakers of the Indo-Aryan language Khetrani. There are four main tribes in Barkhan District: the Khetran, Marri tribe, Hasni tribe and Buzdar tribe. The Khetrans have a chief (called Tumandar) of the tribe, while, each sub-clan/section is represented by a headman (called Wadera).

== Government and politics ==
Barkhan started functioning as a district on 31 December 1991. Previously, it was a tehsil of district Loralai. The main motivation for granting Barkhan the status of a district was to provide basic facilities at a grassroots level and to give people easy access to public offices. District Barkhan comprises only one Tehsil, Barkhan itself.

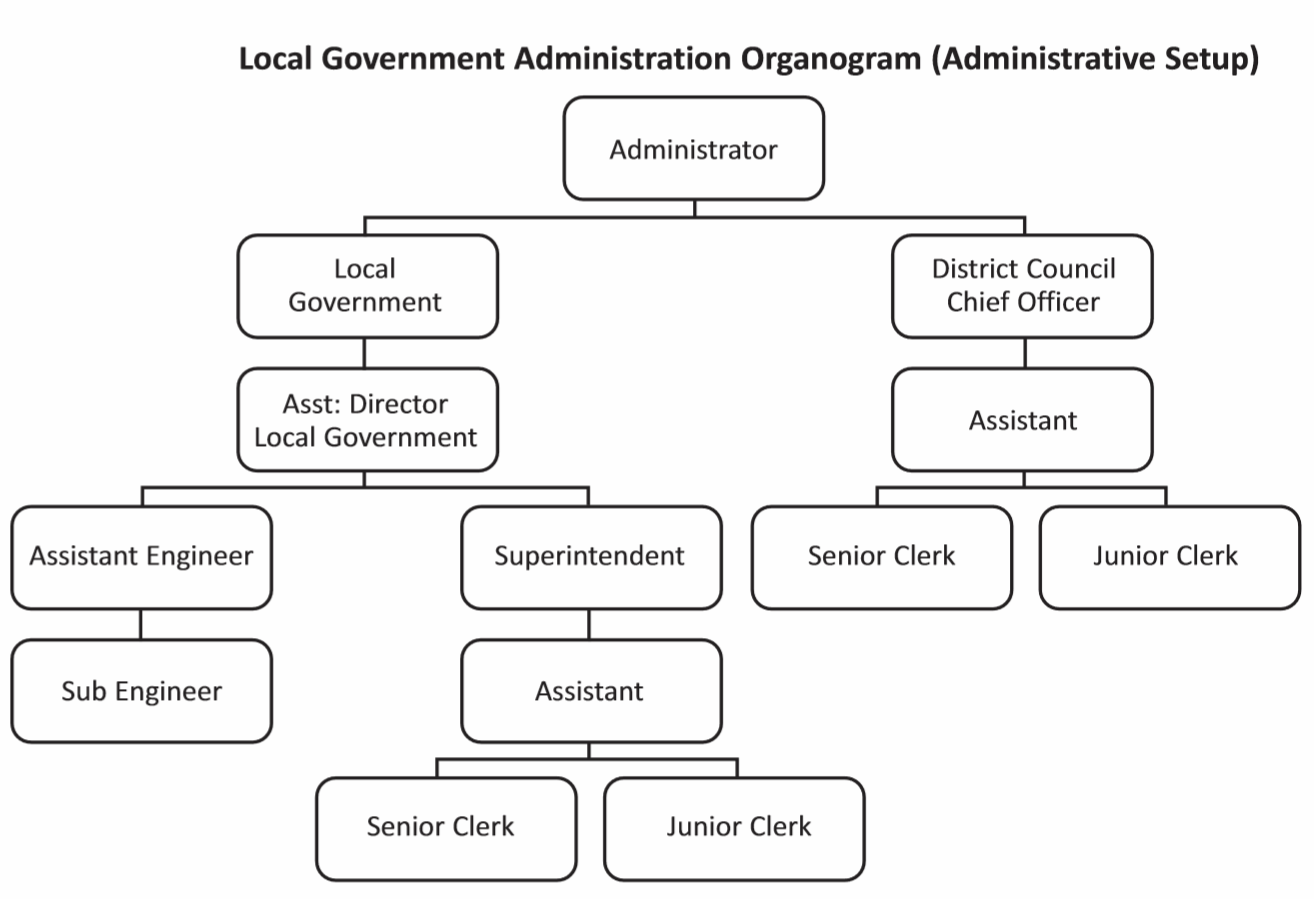
Local Government Administration Organogram (Administrative Setup)

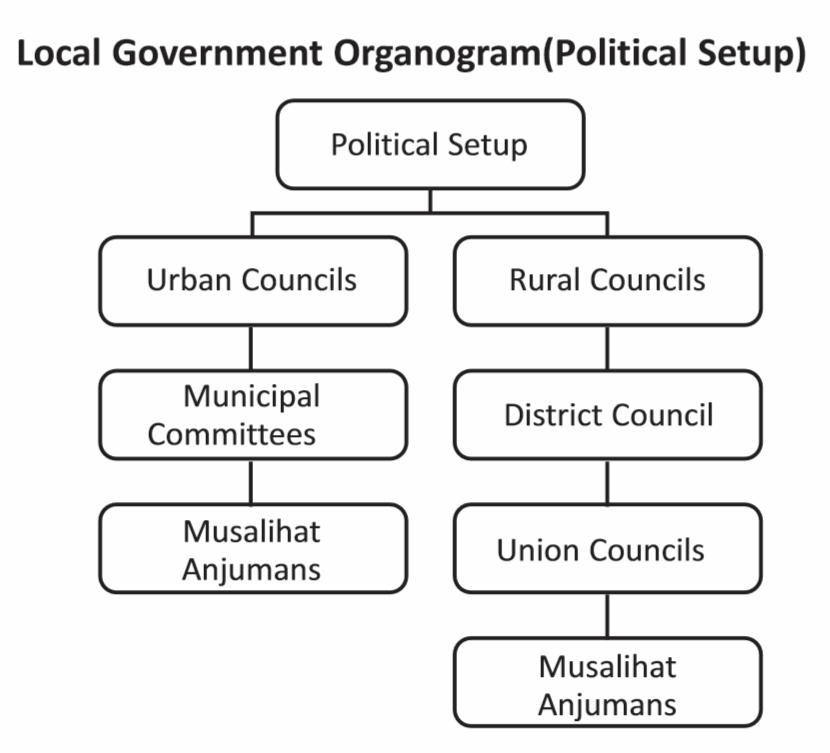
Local government organogram (political)

The Balochistan Local Government Ordinance (BLGO) of 1980 was intended to involve local populations in the development of their areas; it was replaced by BLGO 2001, which introduced the concept of district government. Under BLGO 2001, Barkhan District had one tehsil and eight union councils. The district was administered by a single line of administration that covered both the rural as well as the urban areas.

The system continued for two tenures and was again modified through the approval of BLGA 2010. The present system, under the Local Government Act 2010, is similar to BLGO 1980 in that it emphasizes a rural-urban division, but no elections were held under the latest system.

=== District Council ===
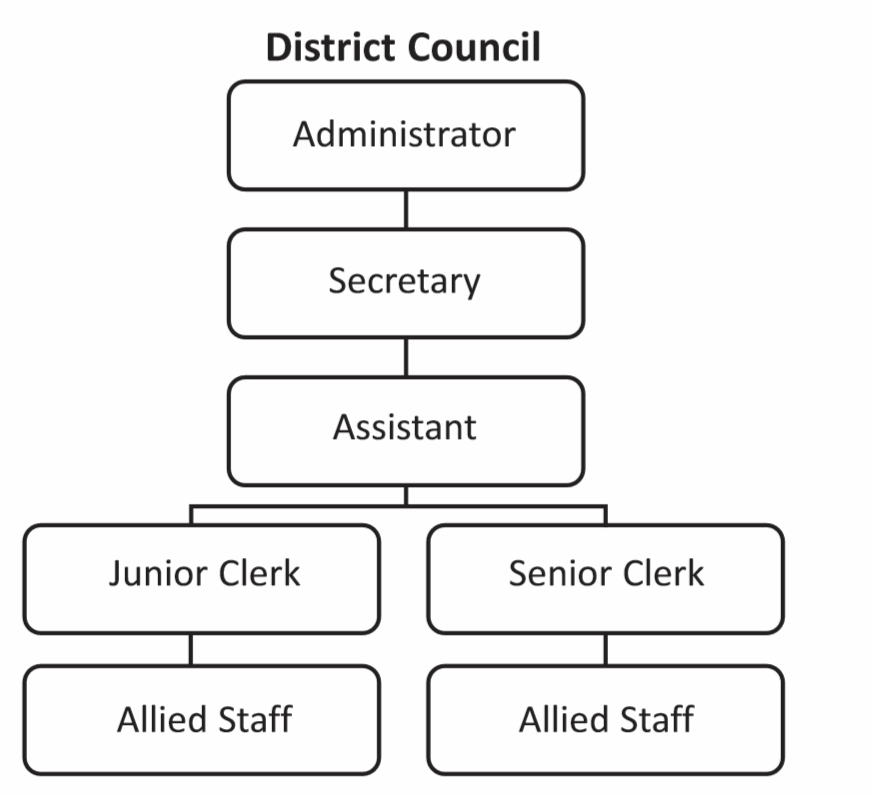
District setup

There are eight union councils' representatives in the District Council of Barkhan, one from each union council. Special seats are allocated to the representatives of workers/peasants, women and minorities as discussed above. All the elected chairmen of the Municipal Committees are also members of the District Council.

The District Council is concerned with rural development activities and functions pertaining to, public health, education, agricultural development and economic welfare, articles of food and drink, drainage, livestock and dairy development, culture and public safety. The District Council can generate revenue by levying fees and various taxes as given in part II of second schedule of BLGA 2010.

=== Federal and government offices and services ===
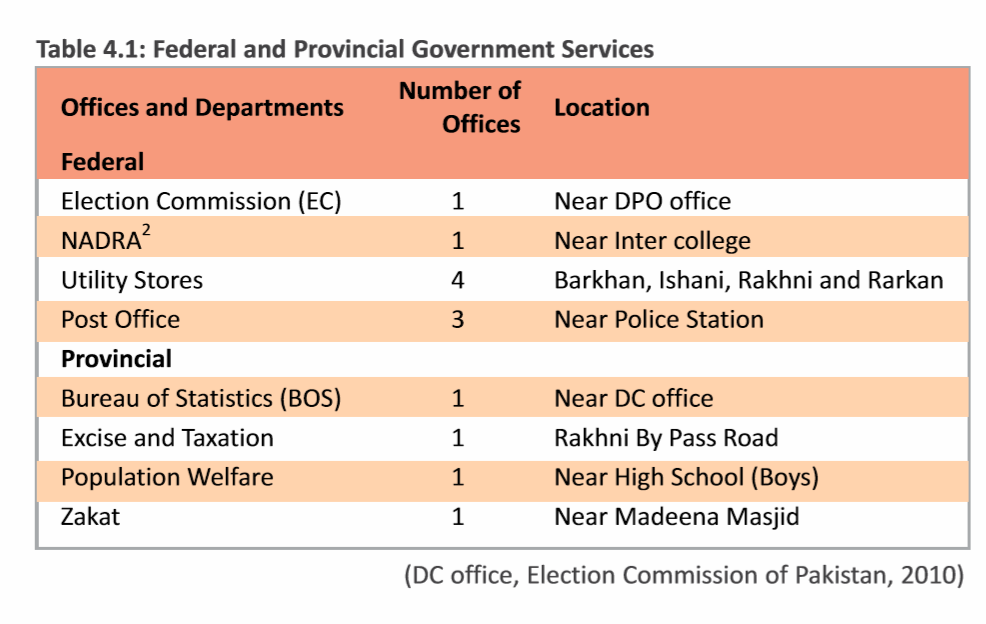
Federal and Provincial Government Departments in Barkhan

A number of Federal and Provincial Government departments provide services at the district level. Except for FBS, Civil Defense and Passport and immigration, all other major departments are functional at the district level, and some departments have offices even at the tehsil level. (DC office, Election Commission of Pakistan, 2010)

== Education and educational institutions ==
According to Pakistan District Education Ranking, a report by Alif Ailaan, district Barkhan is ranked at number 100 nationally with a score of 50.24. The learning score of Barakhan is 54.58 and gender parity of 62.75.

The national rank according to readiness is 100, with a readiness score of 22.66 and primary ratio of 9.7. The school infrastructure score is 20.53, ranking Barkhan district nationally at 153. Functional toilets are a major issues in schools of Barkhan with a score of 2.65.

Issues reported in TaleemDo! App usually relate to poor building walls, putting students lives at risk or in some places no building walls at all. Basic facilities are missing, and there are also many complaints about lack of quality teachers.

In the case of rural females, only 6% had ever-attended any school and only 3% graduated from primary or higher levels. The primary net attendance ratio of school-going age children was 39%, with girls lower than boys (36% versus 41%). This indicates that 61% children were still out of school and will either join late, or probably will never enroll. The total enrollment for middle classes up to December 2009 was 1,085, and total enrollment in secondary classes was only 595. One of the major reasons for low enrollment in secondary levels is non-availability of schools. Against 572 primary schools in the district, there are only 17 middle and 14 high schools. Primary school completion is relatively better (65%).

There are 572 primary schools (407 male and 165 female), 17 middle schools (12 male and 5 female), 14 high schools (12 male and 2 female), 1 girls' inter college and 1 boys' degree 4 college.

== Flora and fauna ==
- Mammals: wolf, hill fox, Asiatic jackal, striped hyaena, cape hare, porcupine, Afghan hedgehog, and stone marten
- Birds: chukar (Alectoris Chukar), see-see partridge (Ammoperdix Griseogularis), kestrel (Falco Tinnunculus), golden eagle (Aquila Chrysaetos Daphanea), a number of finches, buntings, seasonal/migratory waterfowls, hawks, bustards and sand grouse
- Reptiles: Afghan tortoise (Agrionemys Horsfieldii), Afghan agama (Trapelus Megalonyx), Indian cobra (Naja naja), saw-scale viper (Echis Carinatus), dwarf dark-headed racer (Eirenis Persica Walteri) Levantine viper (Macrovipera Lebetina)
- Major crops:
  - Rabi crops: wheat, barley, vegetable and Fodder
  - Kharif crops: sorghum (jowar), millet (bajra), maize, mung bean, mash bean, fruits, onion, potato, vegetable, melon, chili, fodder, garlic and cotton
- Major fruits: apricot, peach, grapes, almond, pomegranate, apple, plum

== Natural resources ==
District Barkhan has deposits of coal and gypsum. The coal deposits are not large. In some places, very minute quantities of coal were found, but the work was abandoned as there was no prospect of commercial benefits. As recently as 2001, a British oil exploration company conducted a survey and found oil reserves in Vitakari, Gadobra and some other areas. The Oil & Gas Development Company Ltd. discovered gas and condensate at Barkhan in 2021.

== See also ==
- Chohar Kot
- Eshani
- Naharkot
- Saddar Barkhan

== Bibliography ==
- 1998 District Census report of Barkhan. Census publication. Vol. 60. Islamabad: Population Census Organization, Statistics Division, Government of Pakistan. 1999.
