= Naharkot =

Naharkot ناہڑ کوٹ
- Union Council
- Interactive map of Naharkot
- Coordinates: 29°45′50″N 69°28′02″E
- Country: Pakistan
- Region: Balochistan
- District: Barkhan District
- Time zone: UTC+5 (PST)

Naharkot (Urdu: ناہڑ کوٹ) is a town and union council of Barkhan District in the Balochistan province of Pakistan. The town contains a small bazaar.
