= Eshan Nayeck =

Eshan "Alexandré" Nayeck (died 10 October 1987) was a Mauritian convicted murderer and the last person to be executed in Mauritius.

On 23 July 1983, 45-year-old Abdool Rashid Atchia was stabbed and killed in the central marketplace of Rose Hill. The assailant fled in the ensuing confusion. In 1987, Nayeck was arrested and tried for the murder of Atchia. In July 1987, the assize court convicted him and sentenced him to death.

Nayeck appealed to the government for clemency, but it was refused and Prime Minister Anerood Jugnauth signed the execution warrant. Nayeck was executed by hanging at Beau Bassin Prison on 10 October 1987. One hour after his execution, doctors stated that Nayeck had died of strangulation. He was the second person executed by Mauritius since its 1968 independence.

The death penalty was abolished in Mauritius in 1995 by the government of the newly elected Navin Ramgoolam.
