= Decree of Diopeithes =

Decree in Ancient Greece (c. 434 BCE)

The Decree of Diopeithes was instituted by the opponents of Pericles in an attempt to discredit Anaxagoras, and, through so doing, to discredit Pericles himself through his association with Anaxagoras. The date is not exact, as sources give different years. Some sources list the arrest and trial of Anaxagoras as early as 437/6 BCE, others at 434 BCE, and still others 432. The charges stemmed from his observations of the heavens and asserting that there were no lunar and solar deities.

According to the Oxford Classical Dictionary, the only reference to this decree comes from Plutarch's Pericles:

And Diopithes proposed a decree, that public accusations should be laid against persons who neglected religion, or taught new doctrines about things above, directing suspicion, by means of Anaxagoras, against Pericles himself.

— Plutarch, Pericles, para. 32

A reference to the trial of Anaxagoras was mentioned by Plato in Apology:

That is an extraordinary statement, Meletus. Why do you say that? Do you mean that I do not believe in the godhead of the sun or moon, which is the common creed of all men?

I assure you, judges, that he does not believe in them; for he says that the sun is stone, and the moon earth.

Friend Meletus, you think that you are accusing Anaxagoras; and you have but a bad opinion of the judges, if you fancy them ignorant to such a degree as not to know that those doctrines are found in the books of Anaxagoras the Clazomenian, who is full of them.

— Plato, Apology
