= Chohar Kot =

- Location within Pakistan
- Coordinates: 29.54°N 69.35°E
- Country: Pakistan
- Province: Balochistan
- Elevation: 1,110 m (3,640 ft)

Population
  - Estimate: 2,000
- Time zone: UTC+5 (PST)

Chohar Kot is a town and union council of Barkhan District in the Balochistan province of Pakistan. It is on the territorial border with the Punjab province. It has a population of about 2000.
