= Eshan Hilal =

Indian belly dancer

Eshan Hilal is an Indian belly dancer.

Hilal grew up in a Muslim family in Delhi, India. He trained in the classical Indian dance technique, kathak, the folk technique, kaalbelia, and in belly dance. He performs professionally as a belly dancer.

In 2017, he walked the runway at NIFT cultural festival in designs by Devanshi Tuli, Tamanna Mehra, Sonal Bhardwaj and Mansi Dua.
