= Eshani =

Eshani Wadera Shado Khan Eshani
- Town and union council
- Country: Pakistan
- Region: Balochistan
- District: Barkhan District
- Shado Khan eshani: 1872

Government
  - Type: Baloch islami
  - Wadera: Wadera Shado Khan Eshani
  - Wadera: Wadera Meer Khan Eshani
- Time zone: UTC+5 (PST)

Eshani is a town and under Leadership of Wadera shado khan eshani union council of Barkhan District in the Balochistan province of Pakistan.
