= Nushki District =

Coordinates: 29°30′N 65°40′E

Nushki District ضلع نوشکی نوشکے دمگ
- District of Balochistan
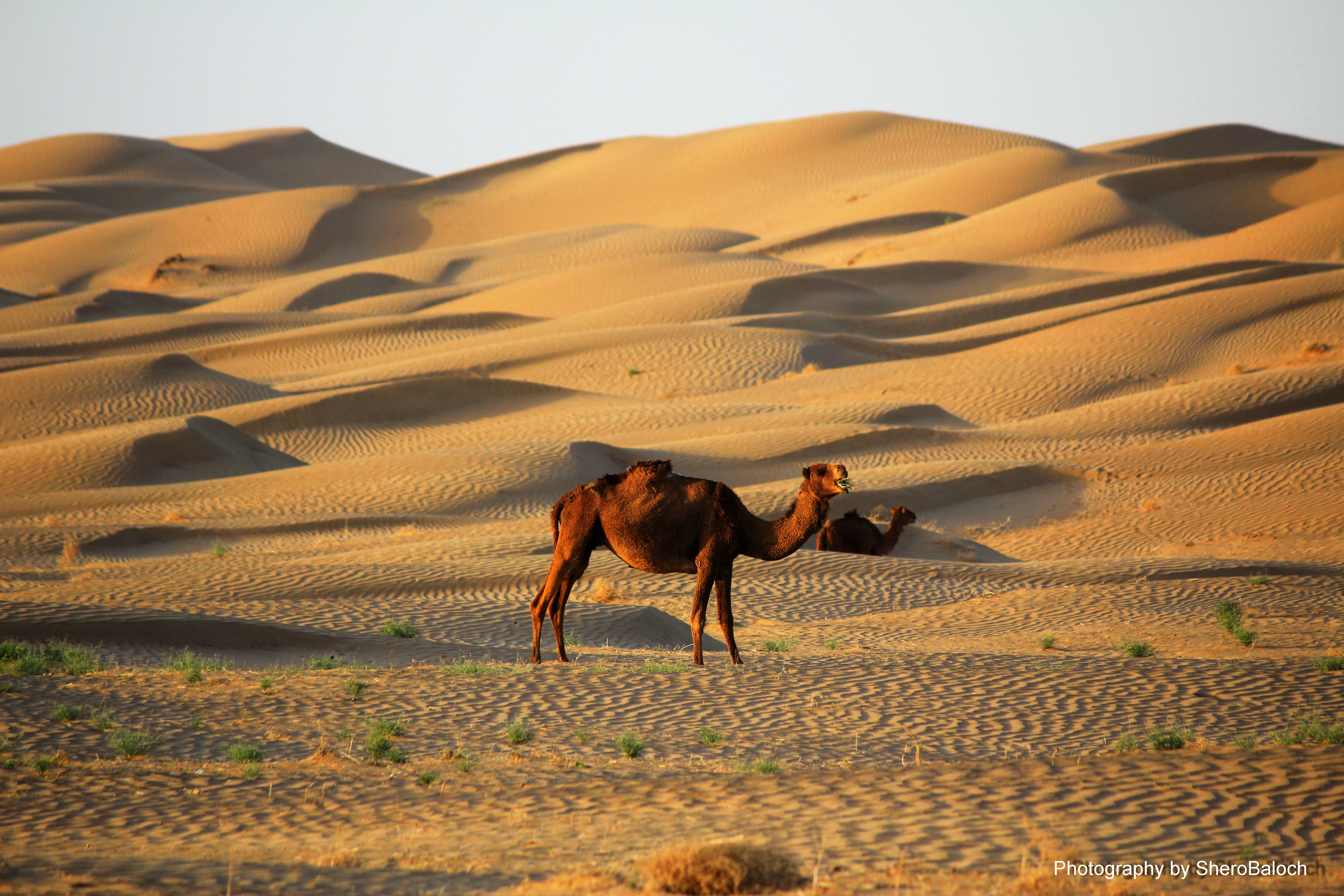
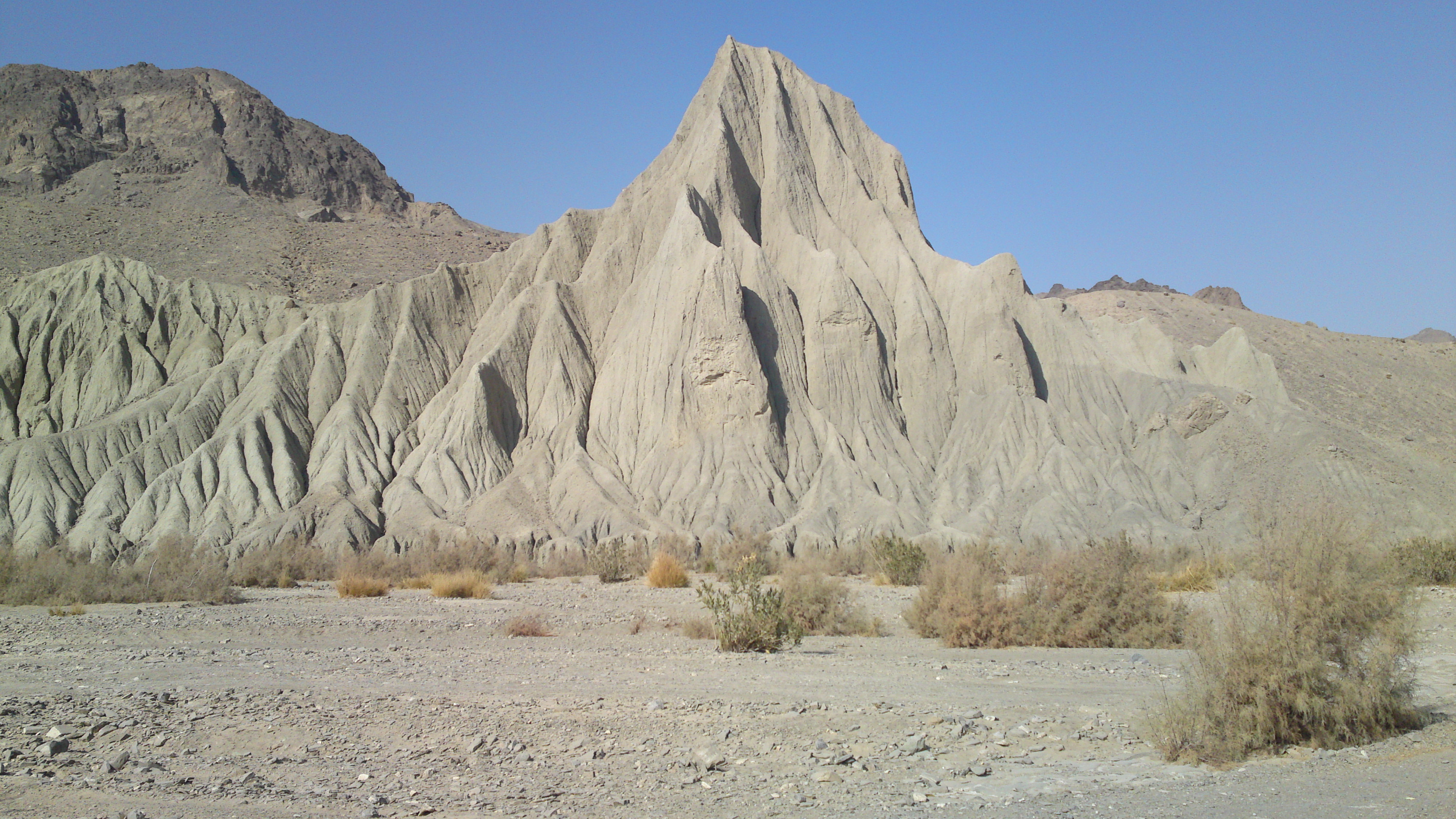
- Top: Camels in Nushki Desert; Bottom: Rako rock formation near Nushki

- Map of Balochistan with Nushki District highlighted
- Country: Pakistan
- Province: Balochistan
- Division: Rakhshan
- Established: N/A
- Headquarters: Nushki

Government
  - Type: District Administration
  - Deputy Commissioner: N/A
  - District Police Officer: N/A
  - District Health Officer: N/A

Area
  - District of Balochistan: 5,797 km^{2} (2,238 sq mi)

Population (2023)
  - District of Balochistan: 207,834
  - Density: 35.85/km^{2} (92.86/sq mi)
  - Urban: 48,572
  - Rural: 159,262

Literacy
  - Literacy rate: Total: (57.12%); Male: (69.24%); Female: (44.16%)
- Time zone: UTC+5 (PST)
- Number of Tehsils: 1

Nushki District (Urdu: ضلع نوشکی, locally known as Noshkay نوشکے) is one of the districts of Balochistan province, Pakistan. The administration of the Nushki district was taken over from the Khan of Kalat by the British government in 1896 and was leased from him on a perpetual quit rent in 1899.

== Etymology ==
Balochi word Noshkay is derived from two Balochi words "Nosh-Koh" which stand for finishing work. The area was known as "Noshkay" until it was changed to "Noshki" during the British era.

== Demographics ==
Historical population
| Year | Pop. | ±% p.a. |
|---|---|---|
| 1951 | ... | — |
| 1961 | 19,849 | — |
| 1972 | 31,261 | +4.22% |
| 1981 | 56,742 | +6.85% |
| 1998 | 98,030 | +3.27% |
| 2017 | 178,947 | +3.22% |
| 2023 | 207,834 | +2.53% |

=== Population ===
As of the 2023 census, Nushki district has 31,255 households and a population of 207,834. The district has a sex ratio of 108.75 males to 100 females and a literacy rate of 57.12%: 69.24% for males and 44.16% for females. 73,251 (35.35% of the surveyed population) are under 10 years of age. 48,572 (23.37%) live in urban areas.

=== Religion ===
Religions in Nushki district (2023)
| Religion | Percent |
| Islam | 99.13% |
| Hinduism | 0.69% |
| Other | 0.23% |

In the 2023 census, Islam was the predominant religion with 99.13% while Hindus formed 0.69% of the population.

=== Language ===
Languages of Nushki district (2023)
1. Brahui (56.9%)
2. Balochi (38.5%)
3. Pashto (4.34%)
4. Others (0.33%)

At the time of the 2023 census, 56.87% of the population spoke Brahui, 38.46% Balochi and 4.34% Pashto as their first language.

== Administrative divisions ==
Nushki District has only one tehsil, Nushki Tehsil, which is further sub-divided into eight union councils: Mengal, Badini Kashingi, Anam Bostan, Dak, Jamaldini, Ahmedwal, Mal, and Municipal Committee Noshki.

| Tehsil | Area (km^{2}) | Pop. (2023) | Density (ppl/km^{2}) (2023) | Literacy rate (2023) | Union Councils |
|---|---|---|---|---|---|
| Nushki Tehsil | 3,731 | 190,905 | 51.17 | 59.04% | ... |
| Dak Tehsil | 2,066 | 16,929 | 8.19 | 36.29% | ... |

== See also ==
- Tehsils of Pakistan
  - Tehsils of Balochistan
- Districts of Pakistan
  - Districts of Balochistan
- Divisions of Pakistan
  - Divisions of Balochistan

== Bibliography ==
- District Gazetteer 1905
- 1998 District census report of Chagai. Census publication. Vol. 38. Islamabad: Population Census Organization, Statistics Division, Government of Pakistan. 1999.
