= Barkhan =

Barkhan: بارکھان; بارکان
- City
- Location within Balochistan, Pakistan Location within Pakistan
- Coordinates: 29°53′57″N 69°31′33″E
- Country: Pakistan
- Province: Balochistan
- District: Barkhan District

Population (2023)
  - Total: 14,425
- Time zone: UTC+5 (PST)

Barkhan (; Urdu: بارکھان) is the capital city of the Barkhan District in the Balochistan province of Pakistan. It is located at 29°54'0N 69°31'0E at an altitude of 1,100 metres (3,612 feet) above sea level.

== Demographics ==
=== Population ===
Historical population
Year	Pop.	±% p.a.
1951	...	—
1961	930	—
1972	1,610	+5.12%
1981	...	—
1998	7,670	—
2017	12,201	+2.47%
2023	14,425	+2.83%

As of the 2023 census, Barkhan had a population of 14,425.

== Climate ==
Barkhan has a hot semi-arid climate (Köppen climate classification BSh) with very hot summers and mild winters. Precipitation mainly falls in two distinct periods: light to moderate rain in the late winter and early spring from February to April, and heavier rain in the monsoon from June to September.

Climate data for Barkhan (1991–2020, extremes 1971–present)
Month	Jan	Feb	Mar	Apr	May	Jun	Jul	Aug	Sep	Oct	Nov	Dec	Year
Record high °C (°F)	25.0 (77.0)	30.5 (86.9)	33.0 (91.4)	39.0 (102.2)	42.8 (109.0)	44.2 (111.6)	42.3 (108.1)	41.6 (106.9)	40.8 (105.4)	37.0 (98.6)	32.2 (90.0)	28.0 (82.4)	44.2 (111.6)
Mean daily maximum °C (°F)	16.9 (62.4)	19.1 (66.4)	24.1 (75.4)	30.0 (86.0)	35.6 (96.1)	37.5 (99.5)	35.9 (96.6)	34.7 (94.5)	33.7 (92.7)	30.1 (86.2)	24.5 (76.1)	19.8 (67.6)	28.5 (83.3)
Daily mean °C (°F)	10.2 (50.4)	12.8 (55.0)	17.6 (63.7)	23.4 (74.1)	28.5 (83.3)	30.7 (87.3)	29.7 (85.5)	27.6 (81.7)	27.0 (80.6)	22.9 (73.2)	17.1 (62.8)	12.6 (54.7)	21.7 (71.1)
Mean daily minimum °C (°F)	3.6 (38.5)	5.9 (42.6)	11.0 (51.8)	16.4 (61.5)	21.3 (70.3)	23.8 (74.8)	23.5 (74.3)	22.7 (72.9)	20.3 (68.5)	15.4 (59.7)	9.7 (49.5)	5.3 (41.5)	14.9 (58.8)
Record low °C (°F)	−1.7 (28.9)	−2.2 (28.0)	2.0 (35.6)	6.1 (43.0)	13.0 (55.4)	13.0 (55.4)	15.7 (60.3)	16.7 (62.1)	13.9 (57.0)	9.0 (48.2)	2.0 (35.6)	−10 (14)	−10 (14)
Average precipitation mm (inches)	12.6 (0.50)	20.9 (0.82)	37.8 (1.49)	37.5 (1.48)	29.3 (1.15)	56.7 (2.23)	103.9 (4.09)	75.6 (2.98)	33.1 (1.30)	11.4 (0.45)	4.3 (0.17)	6.2 (0.24)	429.3 (16.90)
Average precipitation days (≥ 1.0 mm)	2.2	2.9	4.3	4.1	3.4	5.9	8.2	6.5	3.1	1.4	0.7	1.0	43.7
Average relative humidity (%)	43	39	43	34	29	34	55	59	50	33	35	41	41
Source 1: NOAA
Source 2: Deutscher Wetterdienst (humidity 1979-1995)
